= Kwee Thiam Tjing =

Indonesian writer, journalist and political activist

Kwee Thiam Tjing Sia
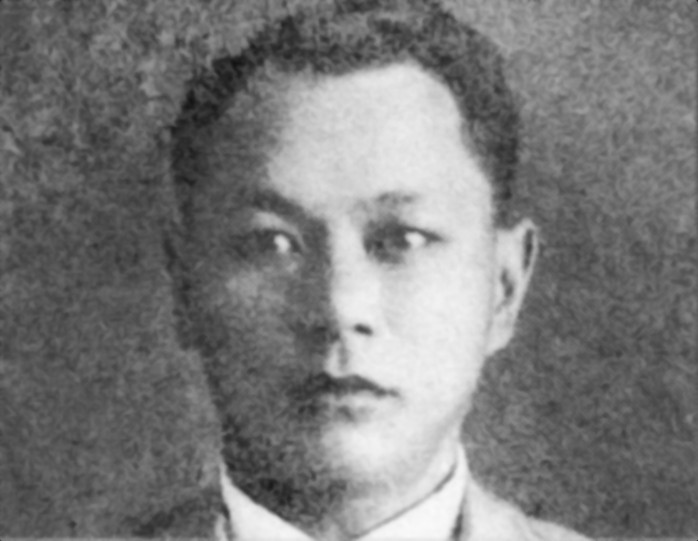
- Born: Kwee Thiam Tjing Sia; 9 February 1900; Pasuruan, Dutch East Indies
- Died: 28 May 1974 (aged 74); Jakarta, Indonesia
- Education: Eerste Europeesche Lagere School (ELS) Malang, MULO Malang
- Occupations: Writer, journalist, newspaper editor and owner and political activist
- Years active: c. 1920s–1974
- Notable work: Indonesia Dalēm Api dan Bara, Menjadi Tjamboek Bērdoeri
- Children: Jeanne Kwee
- Parent(s): Kwee Tjiong Khing Sia (father); Liem Liang Nio (mother)
- Relatives: Kwee Sam Hway, Luitenant der Chinezen of Malang (great-great-grandfather); Kwee Sioe Liem, Kapitein der Chinezen of Pasuruan (great-grandfather)

Kwee Thiam Tjing Sia (Chinese: 郭添清; 9 February 1900 – 28 May 1974), also known by his pen name Tjamboek Bērdoeri (lit. 'Thorn Whip'), was a prominent Indonesian writer, journalist and left-wing political activist. He is best remembered for his 1947 book, Indonesia dalem Api dan Bara (lit. 'Indonesia in Flames and Embers'), and for his role as a co-founder of the Partai Tionghoa Indonesia in 1932.

== Life ==
Born in 1900 in Pasuruan, East Java, Kwee hailed on both sides of his family from old Peranakan lineages of the 'Cabang Atas' gentry with roots in the Chinese officership, which formed the Chinese bureaucratic elite of the Dutch East Indies. His father, Kwee Tjiong Khing, was a paternal grandson of Kwee Sioe Liem, Kapitein der Chinezen of Pasuruan, and a great-grandson of Kwee Sam Hway, the first Luitenant der Chinezen of Malang (1801–1865), as well as a maternal grandson of the Surabaya landowner Tan Tong Liep (1831–1907). Kwee Thiam Tjing's mother, Liem Liang Nio, was the daughter of Liem Bong Wan (b. 1856) and a niece of Liem Bong Lien, Luitenant der Chinezen of Pasuruan (1855–1918). He bore the hereditary title 'Sia' (which he never used) as a descendant of Chinese officers.

His own immediate family, while living in comparatively comfortable circumstances, was no longer part of the uppermost echelons of the Cabang Atas: Kwee's father was only a salaried superintendent at a sugar mill in Malang. Nonetheless, like only a smattering of privileged Indonesians at the time, Kwee still received his entire education at prestigious Dutch-medium schools: the elite Eerste Europeesche Lagere School (ELS) and MULO in Malang. Until 1902, admission to Dutch-language schools for non-Europeans depended not only on money alone: non-European students had to be of Javanese aristocratic or Peranakan Cabang Atas background. Kwee's Dutch education and Peranakan background are reflected in his writings, which show a cosmopolitan linguistic familiarity with Malay, Dutch, Javanese and Hokkien.

After a brief stint at an import-export company, Kwee Thiam Tjing embarked on a journalistic career in which he quickly attained success and recognition. In 1925, Kwee joined the editorial board of Soeara Publiek, a Surabaya newspaper. He was put in prison for ten months in 1926 for writing in support of an Acehnese rebellion in North Sumatra, which constituted an infringement of colonial press law. Kwee subsequently teamed up with the journalist and politician Liem Koen Hian in late 1929 to become an editor of the latter's newspaper in Surabaya, Sin Tit Po, eventually serving as its editor-in-chief in 1931.

Together with Liem in 1932, Kwee founded the Partai Tionghoa Indonesia (PTI), a left-wing political party that advocated ethnic Chinese participation in the Indonesian nationalist movement. He served as the organization's secretary. At the time, ethnic Chinese politics were dominated by the conservative, pro-Dutch party Chung Hwa Hui, seen as a mouthpiece of the colonial Chinese establishment, and by the so-called Sin Po group that advocated allegiance to the Republic of China. Through PTI, Liem and Kwee proposed a third alternative: that Chinese-Indonesians belonged in Indonesia and should participate in their country's national awakening and eventual liberation from colonialism.

Between 1933 and 1934, Kwee relocated to Jember, where he published his own newspaper, Pembrita Djember. When the paper folded, Kwee was invited by the editor and writer Kwee Hing Tjiat to write for Mata Hari, a Semarang newspaper owned by Kian Gwan, then Asia's largest multinational conglomerate (founded in 1863 by Oei Tjie Sien and enlarged by the latter's son, Majoor Oei Tiong Ham). Although Kwee accepted the offer, he remained skeptical about his new paper due to its owner's intimate association with PTI's political adversary, the elitist Chung Hwa Hui. During his time at Mata Hari, Kwee received sarcastic letters from friends who teased him for his supposed capitalist collaboration. By 1936, Kwee – having left Mata Hari – seems to have moved to Bandung, West Java, where he freelanced for a number of newspapers until eventually returning to East Java around 1940.

The Japanese occupation of the Dutch East Indies (1942–1945) ended most of the colonial press and political organizations. Kwee became the head of a Japanese-installed Tonarigumi, a neighborhood local government and the precursor to today's rukun tetangga. During this period, he endeavored to protect Dutch women and children from the Japanese occupation forces. In 1947 in Malang, amidst the Indonesian revolution that followed the Japanese occupation, Kwee – using the pseudonym Tjamboek Berdoeri – published his best-known work, Indonesia dalem Api dan Bara ['Indonesian on Fire']. The historian Benedict Anderson calls it 'still far the best book written by an Indonesian about this period of great turmoil' (Anderson, 2018).

Little is known of his life after 1946. Between 1960 and 1970, Kwee lived in Kuala Lumpur, Malaysia with his daughter, Jeanne Kwee, his son-in-law, the prominent athlete Stanley Gouw, and their children. Kwee returned to Indonesia in 1970, and from 1971 until 1973 wrote a serialized autobiography for the activist and writer Mochtar Lubis's newspaper Indonesia Raya. The paper was banned by the Soeharto regime in 1974. Kwee Thiam Tjing died soon after in Jakarta on May 28, 1974.

== Ancestry ==
Ancestors of Kwee Thiam Tjing

16. Kwee Sam Hway, 1st Luitenant der Chinezen of Malang (1801–1865)
8. Kwee Sioe Liem, Kapitein der Chinezen of Pasuruan
17. Yauw Ting Kong
4. Kwee Ping Kwie Sia
9. Sie Tjan Nio
2. Kwee Tjiong Khing Sia
20. Tan Hwa Siang (b. 1806)
10. Tan Tong Liep (1831–1907)
21. Oei Hong Nio
5. Tan Tiong Nio
22. Kwee Yong Hoo
11. Kwee Bien Nio (1831–1905)
1. Kwee Thiam Tjing Sia
24. Liem Ian Kie (1805–1848)
12. Liem Boen Ping (1831–1891)
25. Nio Hoo Nio (1813–1866)
6. Liem Bong Wan (b. 1856)
26. Kwee Sam Hway, 1st Luitenant der Chinezen of Malang (1801–1865) (=16)
13. Kwee Khin Nio (1838–1878)
27. Yauw Ting Kong (=17)
3. Liem Liang Nio
7. Kwee Khiam Nio

== See also ==
- Benedict Anderson
- Partai Tionghoa Indonesia
- Liem Koen Hian
- Ko Kwat Tiong
- Chung Hwa Hui
- H. H. Kan
- Mochtar Lubis
