= Han Tiauw Tjong =

Han Tiauw Tjong Sia (1894–1940), known as Dr. Ir. Han Tiauw Tjong, was a prominent colonial Indonesian politician, engineer, community leader and a member of the influential Han family of Lasem. He sat in the Volksraad (the colonial legislature) of the Dutch East Indies for two terms (1924 – 1929, 1938 – 1939), and was a founding member of the centre-right political party Chung Hwa Hui. Han also served as a Trustee of the Technische Hoogeschool te Bandoeng (now an Indonesian national research university, ITB: the Institut Teknologi Bandung) from 1924 until 1940.

== Biography ==
=== Family background ===
Born in Probolinggo, East Java on February 1, 1894, Han came from the Surabaya branch of the Han family of Lasem, one of the oldest Peranakan dynasties of the 'Cabang Atas' gentry of Java (baba bangsawan) with a long tradition of public service. Han was the son of Han Biauw Sing, Luitenant der Chinezen of Kutaraja in Aceh (in office from May 21, 1913, until September 12, 1918), who was in turn a great-grandson of Han Phik Long Sia (1761–1788), one of the sons of Han Bwee Kong, Kapitein der Chinezen of Surabaya (1727–1778), an early comprador and ally of the Dutch East India Company. The Chinese officership was a post in the colonial civil administration (the Bestuur over Vreemde Oosterlingen) with political and legal jurisdiction over the local Chinese community; by Indies custom, as the son of a Chinese officer, Han Tiauw Tjong bore the hereditary style of Sia.

=== Early life and the Netherlands ===
Han Tiauw Tjong attended the Europeesche Lagere School (ELS) in Kraksaan, Probolinggo and the Hogere Burgerschool (HBS) in Semarang before leaving in 1911 for the Netherlands, where he continued his HBS education and studied at Delft University. He graduated as an engineer in 1921, and received his doctorate in 1922 after submitting his dissertation, published in 1922 by Nijhoff as De industrialisatie van China (the 'industrialisation of China').

While in the Netherlands, Han was active in Chung Hwa Hui Nederland, a Peranakan student association. He occupied several board positions in the group between 1916 and 1922, and served as its president from 1919 until 1920. Klaas Stutje deems Han to be a ‘leading figure’ of the association's ‘China-oriented tendency’, advocating Chinese nationality for Indies Chinese and criticising the colonial Dutch Nationality Law that placed ethnic Chinese legally below Europeans in the Indies.

=== Politician and community leader ===
After his return to the Indies in 1921, Han's views evolved and came down strongly in favour of loyalty to the Dutch East Indies as the homeland its ethnic Chinese community. In May 1924, he was appointed to the Volksraad, the embryonic legislature of the Dutch East Indies, and served until June 1929; a second term followed from July 1938 until June 1939.

In a working paper in 1927, Han outlined the six achievements of the ethnic Chinese members of the Volksraad in bettering the position of the Chinese-Indonesian community:

1. "the appointment of women doctors for the inspection of the medical health of Chinese women who arrived here, after complaints had been made about the malpractices involving newly arrived Chinese women…;
2. the establishment of H. C. S. [Dutch Chinese schools] for girls…;
3. investigation into the treatment of journalists in Glodok prison…;
4. points that should be observed when doing house search [for police work]…;
5. expansion of the cinema committee to include one Chinese member…;
6. presumably, the number of H. C. S. will increase as a result of the discussions in the Volksraad…"

These concessions given to the ethnic Chinese community by the colonial authorities were part of the overall campaign, on the part of Han and his ethnic Chinese colleagues in the Volksraad, for racial legal equality in the Indies. Together with his parliamentary colleagues H. H. Kan and Loa Sek Hie, Han was instrumental in the establishment in 1928 of Chung Hwa Hui (CHH) in the Dutch East Indies, a centre-right political party affiliated to his old student organisation in the Netherlands. With H. H. Kan as founding president, CHH became a platform for Han and his colleagues to advocate cooperation with the Dutch colonial state to achieve legal equality for ethnic Chinese subjects in the Indies. CHH was later criticised for its supposed pro-Dutch sympathies, conservatism and elitist outlook, for which it was dubbed the 'Packard Club' after the automobiles used by some of the party's leaders.

At the end of his tenure in the Volksraad, Han settled down in Semarang and became a deputy of the Provincial Council of Central Java (the Provincialen Raad van Midden-Java), a role he performed until his death in 1940. Han's preoccupation with education also led him to serve as a Trustee of the Technische Hoogeschool te Bandoeng (ITB) from 1924 until 1940. During his tenure, the young Sukarno was an engineering student at the institute and later keenly remembered Han's contribution to the ITB.

=== Private life, house and death ===
Han Tiauw Tjong was married to Hoo Hien Nio (1895–1984), who was the principal heiress of the Pekalongan tycoon Hoo Tjien Siong. The couple had five children: Han Bing Yang, Han Tjia Nio, Han Bing Hoo, Han Bing Tjoe and Han Bing Siong. Han Tiauw Tjong was one of the shareholders of Indische Lloyd, an insurance company, and also owned an ice cream factory, ‘Doro’, in Pekalongan.

Han commissioned the prominent Delft and Paris-trained architect Liem Bwan Tjie to design their Art Deco villa in Candi, Semarang. Completed in 1932, Leo Suryadinata calls the house ‘the grandest of his experiments [Liem's]’. According to Judy den Dikken, it recalls the architecture of Frank Lloyd Wright, but in an Indies setting.

On June 25, 1940, Han underwent what appeared initially to be a successful bowel operation at the Juliana-ziekenhuis in Semarang. On June 27, the Governor of Central Java prematurely announced the success of Han's operation to the Provincial Council and wished him a speedy recovery. Han Tiauw Tjong's condition, however, took a turn for the worse; and he died on June 29, 1940.

== Major publication ==
- De industrialisatie van China (in Dutch) [English: 'The Industrialisation of China']. Nijhoff (1922)

== See also ==
- Chung Hwa Hui
- Institut Teknologi Bandung
- Han family of Lasem
- H. H. Kan
- Loa Sek Hie
- Liem Bwan Tjie
