= Thio Thiam Tjong =

Indonesian politician (1896–1969)

- 張添聰
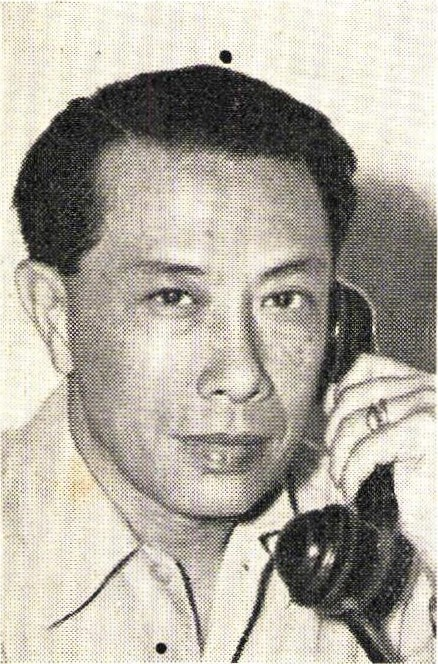
- Thio Thiam Tjong as an Advisor in the Cabinet of Acting Governor-General H. van Mook
- Born: 4 April 1896; Semarang, Dutch East Indies
- Died: 19 September 1969 (aged 73); The Netherlands
- Education: Delft University
- Occupations: politician, community leader
- Years active: 1920s–1960s
- Political party: Partai Demokrasi Tionghoa Indonesia
- Other political affiliations: Chung Hwa Hui (1928-1942)
- Spouse: Goei Lee Ging
- Children: No issue
- Parents: Thio Sing Liong (father); Tan Tien Nio (mother)
- Family: Tan Ing Kie, Kapitein-titulair der Chinezen (great-grandfather); Oei Tiong Ham, Majoor der Chinezen (uncle-in-law); Madame Wellington Koo (cousin-in-law)

Thio Thiam Tjong (born on 4 April 1896 – died on 19 September 1969) was an Indonesian politician, community leader and businessman whose public career spanned from the late colonial period to the early decades of independence. He was a founding board member in 1928 of Chung Hwa Hui, a Chinese-Indonesian, colonial political party, and was president of the group's post-WW II political successor Persatoean Tionghoa, formed in 1948, then renamed Partai Demokrasi Tionghoa Indonesia in 1950.

== Early career and family background ==
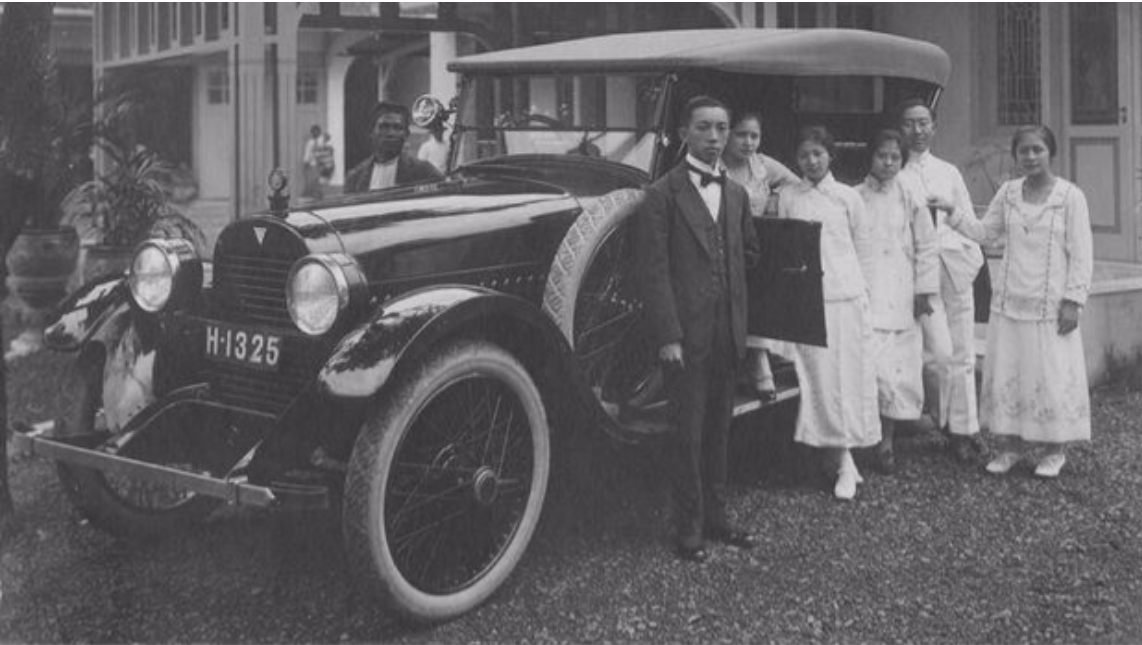
Thio Thiam Tjong and his siblings at their family house in Semarang in the 1910s

Thio was born in 1896 in Semarang, Central Java, into a prominent family on both sides. His father, the wealthy businessman Thio Sing Liong (1871–1940), was a third-generation Peranakan Chinese and the founder of Handel Maatschappij Thio Sing Liong, a leading export–import company. In contrast to his father's business background, Thio's mother – Tan Tien Nio – hailed from the 'Cabang Atas' gentry as a granddaughter of Tan Ing Kie, Kapitein-titulair der Chinezen (1835–1895). Through his mother, Thio was therefore a direct descendant of Tan Yok Sing, Kapitein der Chinezen of Semarang (1737–1800) under the Dutch East India Company (VOC). Tan Yok Sing came to the Indies in the mid-1700s as a descendant of the Tan (Chen in Mandarin) family from Zhangzhou, Fujian. This is the family that is famous for its most prominent member Tan Yong Hua or Chen Yong Hua (陳永華), who served as the advisor to Koxinga in 1666, contributed much to the conquest of Taiwan from the Dutch VOC and later the administration of Taiwan. Like most in his social class, Thio had an entirely Dutch language-based education in Semarang, then at a Hogere Burgerschool (HBS, secondary school) in Leiden in the Netherlands. He studied engineering at Delft University, but left prior to graduating in 1922 to join his father's business. Following his father's retirement in 1933, Thio took over the family business and expanded it. He was also a board member of a number of other companies.

== Public life ==
Thio emerged as a community leader in the late 1920s, and played an important role in the Chung Hwa Congress of 1927, which led to the founding in 1928 of the political association Chung Hwa Hui (CHH). The influential group was later criticised by left-wing critics as the 'Packard Club', a supposed cipher for the interests of the colonial Chinese establishment, most notably the conglomerate Kian Gwan, owned by Thio's in-laws, the Oei family.

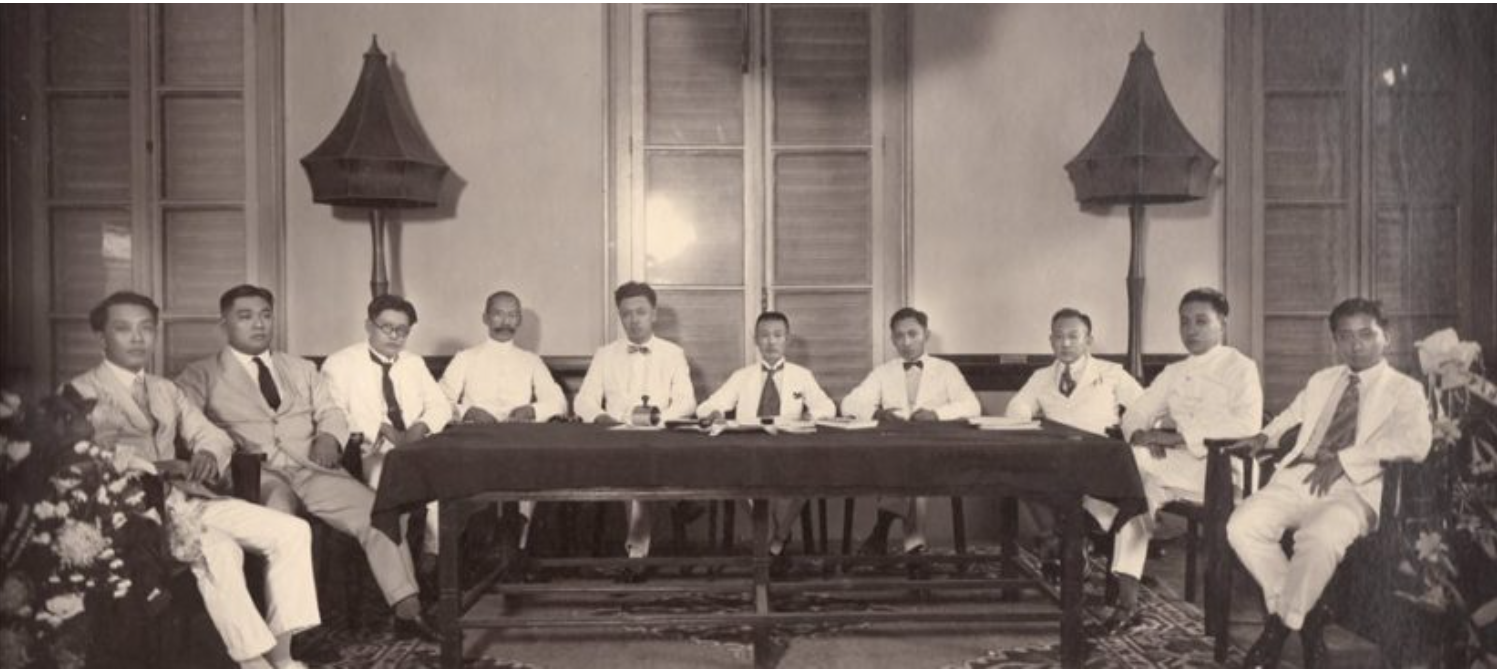
Thio (first on the left) at part of the Preparatory Commission of the Chung Hwa Congress of 1927

Thio sat on the central board of CHH under the elder statesman H. H. Kan and became president of the group's Semarang branch in the 1930s. From 1930 until 1934, he acted as chairman of the Siang Hwee, or Chinese Chamber of Commerce, of Semarang. He also served as a member of the Provincialen Raad van Midden-Java or the Provincial Council of Central Java.

Prior to the Japanese invasion of the Indies during World War II, Thio headed an anti-Japanese resistance group. For much of the Japanese occupation from 1943 until 1945, Thio was interned with other political leaders in Cimahi. He spent his time there learning Mandarin, and took on the informal role of leader of his fellow ethnic Chinese prisoners.

After Japan's defeat in World War II, Sukarno and Hatta unilaterally declared Indonesian independence on 17 August 1945, which was not recognised by the Dutch authorities or the victorious Allies. When the Dutch returned to the Indies in March 1946, Thio was appointed as Advisor in the Emergency Cabinet of the Netherlands Indies Civil Administration (NICA) under his personal friend, H. van Mook, Acting Governor-General of the Dutch East Indies. Despite Thio's close involvement in van Mook's vision of a federal Indonesia, he avoided overt criticisms of the unitary Republic of Indonesia, headed by Sukarno and Hatta.

In 1947, Thio married Goei Lee Ging, a fellow scion of the Cabang Atas as a direct descendant of Goei Poen Kong, Luitenant der Chinezen (1765–1806), and one with important connections. His parents-in-law were Goei Khek Ho and Oei Bok Nio, part of an earlier double marriage involving their sister and brother respectively, Goei Bing-nio and the powerful tycoon Oei Tiong Ham, Majoor der Chinezen. Thio's wife was, therefore, a niece by marriage of the deceased Majoor Oei Tiong Ham, and a first cousin of the latter's daughters, the international socialites and political wives Oei Tjong-lan and Oei Hui-lan, better known as Madame Wellington Koo.

In 1948, Thio became president of Persatoean Tionghoa (PT, Chinese Union), a Chinese-Indonesian community and political organisation that was created in 1948 towards the end of the Indonesian Revolution (1945–1949). The revolution was both a war of independence against NICA and an internal social revolution against the pro-Dutch established elite. PT, seen by many as a successor of the pre-war CHH, aimed to represent the political aspirations of the Chinese-Indonesian community at the conclusion of the revolution and the handover of power from NICA to the new Indonesian authorities. After Dutch recognition of Indonesian independence, PT was transformed in 1950 under Thio's presidency into Partai Demokrasi Tionghoa Indonesia (PDTI). Liem Koen Hian, founder of the left-wing, pre-revolutionary Partai Tionghoa Indonesia, dismissed PT and PDTI – as he had CHH – as elitist and unable to deal with native Indonesians. In post-colonial Indonesia, PDTI's association with CHH doomed the party, and Thio's background in the pre-revolutionary political establishment meant that he could not play a meaningful role in new politics of the post-revolutionary Republic of Indonesia.

Thio Thiam Tjong died in exile in the Netherlands on 22 September 1969, and left no children.

== See also ==
- Chung Hwa Hui
- Partai Demokrasi Tionghoa Indonesia
- Liem Koen Hian
