= Kwee Hing Tjiat =

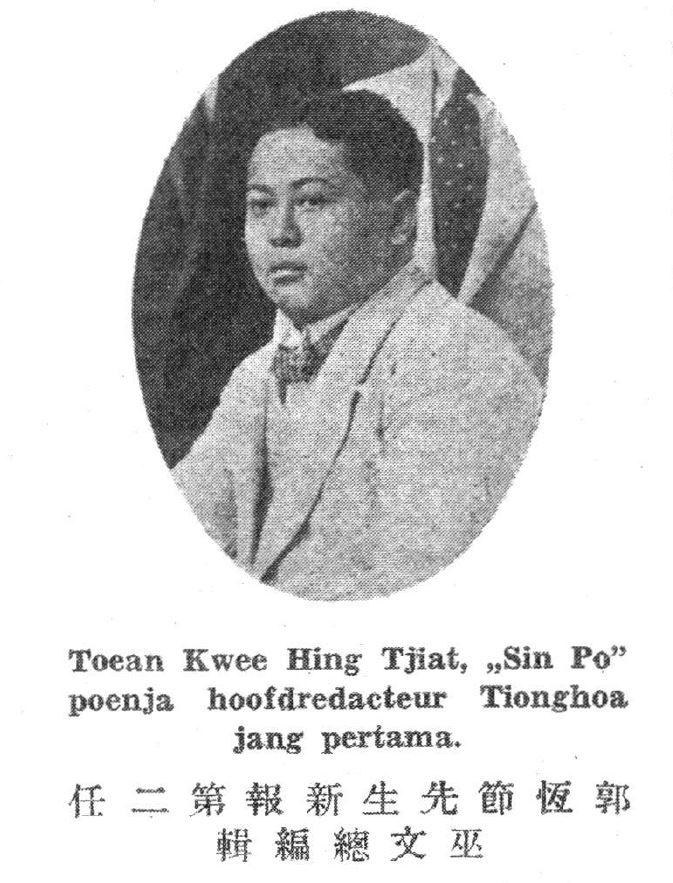
A portrait of Kwee Hing Tjiat, Chinese Indonesian journalist

Kwee Hing Tjiat (Chinese: 郭恒節, born Surabaya, 1891, died Semarang, 27 June 1939) was a Chinese-Malay journalist and a leading peranakan Chinese intellectual of the late colonial era.

He spent his childhood in Surabaya, Dutch East Indies and was educated in a Dutch vocational school (Burgersavondschool) and probably also in a Chinese school (Tiong Hoa Hwee Koan). At the age of 21 (in 1913), together with Lie Biauw Kie, Tjia Tjiep Ling, Tan Tjiang Ling, Liem Thoan Tik, and Liem Tjhioe Kwie, he founded the first weekly published in Surabaya named Bok Tok.

In 1914 he became chief editor of Tjhoen Tjhioe's weekly led by Tjoa Jan Hie. In the same year he became chief editor of Palita in Yogyakarta. In 1916 he was invited to the capital Batavia where he was made editor in chief of the daily Sin Po. The first editor of the paper had been a European for legal reasons so Kwee was the first Chinese to hold this position. There he advocated for Chinese nationalism and was critical of the Dutch. During this era he believed that Ethnic Chinese in the Indies should not involve themselves in local politics nor be compelled to serve in the proposed local defense forces which were being discussed at the time (the Indië Weerbaar).

In 1918 he was sent to Europe on behalf of the business firm Hoo Tik Thay in order to help them with tobacco exports, although he continued to write for Sin Po. He traveled in Europe for four years and lived in Berlin for a time. In 1921 he wrote a book titled Doea Kapala Batoe (Malay: lit. Two Heads of Stone, or Two Stubborn Men), an account of Chinese politics in Java.

He returned to the Dutch East Indies in 1923 but when he arrived at the Port of Tanjung Priok he was refused entry. Then he settled in Shanghai, where he lived for ten years, and wrote for various newspapers in China and Java. Despite his long-standing advocacy of Chinese nationalism, he felt like a foreigner there.

In 1934 he was allowed to return to the Indies under the guarantee of Oei Tiong Hauw of the Oei Tiong Ham Concern. With their support he founded a new Chinese-Malay newspaper called Matahari (Malay: The Sun). His early staff were Liem Koen Hian, Mr. Ko Kwat Tiong, Kwee Tek Hoaij, Kwee Thiam Tjing, Njonja Tjoa Hin Hoei, Njonja Lim Sam Tjiang and Miss Thung Tien.

Based on his experience living in Europe and China, his political views shifted and he realized that peranakan Chinese were more culturally Indonesian than Chinese. For example, he met the Chinese ambassador in Vienna and was embarrassed by his inability to express himself in the language. In the 1930s, under the influence of Indonesian nationalists, he advanced the idea that Indies Chinese were also poetra Indonesia (Malay: sons of Indonesia).

Kwee Hing Tjiat died at 19:40, 27 June 1939 (at the age of 47) in Semarang.

== Sources ==
- Lohanda, Mona. Growing pains: The Chinese and the Dutch in colonial Java, 1890–1942. Yayasan Cipta Loka Caraka, 2002.
- Leo Suryadinata. Peranakan Chinese Politics in Java, 1917–1942. Singapore University Press, 1981.
