= Chinese Indonesian Democratic Party =

Chinese Indonesian Democratic Party 印度尼西亞中華民主黨 Partai Demokrat Tionghoa Indonesia
- Chairman: Thio Thiam Tjong
- Founded: 23 May 1948 (as the "PPTI" Partai Persatuan Tionghoa Indonesia)
- Dissolved: 1965
- Preceded by: Chung Hwa Hui
- Headquarters: Djakarta, Indonesia
- Ideology: Indonesian federalism Chinese nationalism
- Political position: Centre-right

The Chinese Indonesian Democratic Party (Indonesian: Partai Demokrat Tionghoa Indonesia; (traditional Chinese: 印度尼西亞中華民主黨; simplified Chinese: 印度尼西亚中华民主党; pinyin: Mínzhǔ Yìndùníxīyà zhōnghuá dǎng) was a political party that existed during the Guided Democracy era in Indonesia, from 1948 until 1965. The party identified itself as a supporter for the relationship between Indonesia and China, and supported the mandatory teaching of the Chinese language in Indonesian schools.

== History ==
=== Background ===
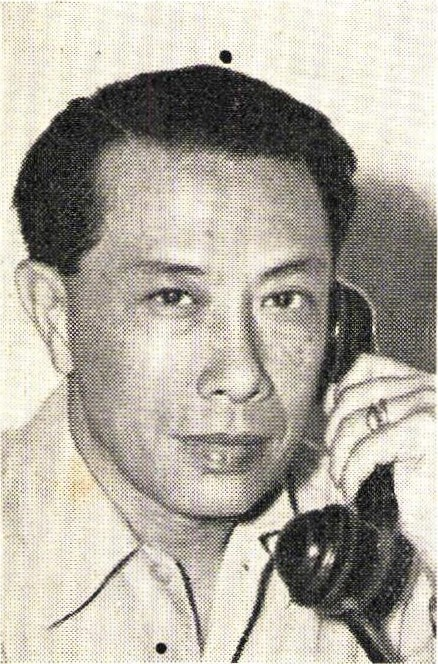
Thio Thiam Tjong, chairman of the Chinese Indonesian Democratic Party.

The two major ethnic Chinese political parties of the pre-revolutionary period, Chung Hwa Hui (CHH) and Partai Tionghoa Indonesia (PTI), were both disbanded in 1942 at the start of the Japanese occupation of the Dutch East Indies during World War II. The idea of reviving a political party for Chinese Indonesians was proposed as an initiative by the Sin Ming Hui Association. As a result, several heads of the Chinese diaspora in Indonesia were invited by the association to discuss about this matter. The discussion resulted in the formation of a preparatory committee.

The preparatory committee established the political party on 23 May 1948 as the Chinese Union (Indonesian: Persatoean Tionghoa), and the establishment was followed shortly with the First Congress of the Persatoean Tionghoa. It was a thinly guised revival of the colonial-era, centre-right party Chung Hwa Hui. The congress elected a former CHH board member Thio Thiam Tjong as the chairman of the party.

=== Development ===
Two years after the party was established, the party already had twenty seven branches in the provinces of Indonesia, ranging from Medan to Ternate. The party had already enlisted tens of thousands members, and different Chinese organizations joined the party, such as C.H.T.H., Tionghoa Siang Hwee, Sin Ming Hui, and C.H.T.N.H, making it the largest political party for the Chinese Indonesians at that time.

In February 1950, Liem Koen Hian, founder of the colonial-era Partai Tionghoa Indonesia – CHH's old adversary – criticised the new Thio-led party as naive and incompetent, unable to deal with the indigenous Indonesian majority. Liem founded Persatuan Tenaga Indonesia (the 'Union of Indonesian Labour'), thus reviving the old colonial-era rivalry between CHH and PTI, but in a new post-revolutionary guise.

The party held its second congress in Jakarta on 11 until 12 March 1950. On the congress, the party's name was changed to the Chinese Indonesian Democratic Party.

The third party congress was held in Bandung on 11 until 13 August 1950. The party agreed to create and approve a new constitution.
