= Ko Kwat Tiong =

Ko Kwat Tiong Sia (1896–1970), known as Mr. Ko Kwat Tiong and later Mohamad Saleh, was a prominent Indonesian politician, lawyer, civil servant and university lecturer. He was elected to the Volksraad (the colonial legislature) in 1935 as a representative of the Partai Tionghoa Indonesia (PTI: the 'Chinese-Indonesian Party'), and – after Independence in 1945 – headed the Balai Harta Peninggalan (the ‘Public Trustee Office’) in Central Java until retiring in 1960.

== Biography ==
=== Family and early life ===
Ko was born in 1898 in Parakan, Central Java, to the town's Luitenant der Chinezen, Ko Djie Soen (in office from 1893 until 1898), and as such into a Peranakan family of the ‘Cabang Atas’ gentry. The Chinese lieutenancy was a post in the colonial civil administration (the Bestuur over Vreemde Oosterlingen) with political and legal jurisdiction over the local Chinese community; by Indies custom, as the son of a Chinese officer, Ko Kwat Tiong bore the hereditary style of Sia. Ko was brought up by his much-older brother, the prominent businessman and community leader Ko Kwat Ie, who founded the eponymous cigar factory in Magelang, Central Java.

Ko attended the Europeesche Lagere School (ELS) in Magelang and the Hogere Burgerschool (HBS) in Semarang; both institutions only admitted elite European students and a very small number of select non-Europeans. At the HBS, he founded a western-style club, named ‘Djien Gie Lee Tie Sien’ after the five Confucian virtues, which Ko – conversant only in Malay, Dutch, Javanese and European languages – studied in western translations of the Chinese classics.

=== Early career and Leiden ===
Instead of going to university in Europe, as originally planned, Ko was forced because of World War I to postpone his studies. He worked as a journalist in Yogyakarta for Palita, a local newspaper, then at the Escompto Bank (now Bank Dagang Negara). It was only in 1920, together with his first wife Lie Giok Ing, that Ko finally left for the Netherlands to study law at Leiden University.

While in Leiden, Ko joined Chung Hwa Hui Nederland, a Peranakan student association, and socialised in elite Peranakan student circles. He did, however, also associate with indigenous Indonesian students, such Sartono, Sastromoeljono, Besar Mertokoesoemo, Mochamad Soejoedi and Soenario who would all later feature prominently as leaders of the Partai Nasional Indonesia (PNI: the 'Indonesian National Party'), an influential political party in post-revolutionary Indonesia. Ko graduated in 1926, then returned to Java.

=== Legal and political career ===
Settling down in Semarang, Ko initially joined the law firm of his Leiden contemporary H. K. Jauw, a judge of the city's European Court. Later on, together with his nephew, near contemporary and Leiden alumnus, Ko Tjay Sing, Ko shared a legal bureau with their indigenous fellow Leiden law graduates. Through their association with Indonesians, the Ko men developed an affinity with, and sympathy for, the Indonesian nationalist movement. As a Freemason, Ko also believed in the fraternity and equality of all men.

In 1928, when the political party Chung Hwa Hui (CHH) was founded as an affiliate of Ko Kwat Tiong's old Dutch student association, Ko immediately became a member. Unlike the so-called Sin Po group, which promoted loyalty to the pre-war Republic of China, CHH's political allegiance was to the Dutch East Indies as the homeland of the Indies-born Chinese-Indonesians. When it became clear, however, that CHH was dominated by entrenched interests of the Cabang Atas and ethnic Chinese conglomerates, led by the pro-Dutch patrician H. H. Kan, Ko resigned his membership and distanced himself from CHH.

When the leftwing newspaper man Liem Koen Hian founded the Partai Tionghoa Indonesia on 25 September 1932, Ko enthusiastically joined the new political outfit. At his own initiative, Ko set up PTI's Semarang branch on 9 October that year, acting as its chairman before being elected in 1934 as president of the party's central board in succession to Liem. The PTI fully supported the Indonesian nationalist movement and saw ethnic Chinese, like other ethnic groups in the Indies, as part of the emerging Indonesian nation. In 1935, as a representative of the PTI, Ko won a seat in that year's election to the Volksraad.

During his tenure in the nascent colonial legislature from 1935 until 1939, Ko campaigned for racial equality for all under Indies law, and for a more progressive labour law regime. In 1936, together with co-legislators Soetardjo Kartohadikoesoemo, Sayyid Ismail Alatas, I. J. Kasimo, Sam Ratulangi and Datoek Toemoenggoeng, Ko initiated and was one of the six signatories of the Soetardjo Petition, which was a request to Queen Wilhelmina of the Netherlands for Indonesian independence as part of a Dutch commonwealth under the Dutch Crown. On 19 September 1936, Ko gave a speech in support of the parliamentary motion, which was passed by the Volksraad, but refused by the Dutch and colonial authorities in 1938. In 1939, Ko – the Dutch-educated son of a Chinese officer – was elected chairman of the Federasi Perkoempoeloan Boeroeh Tionghoa (the ‘Federation of Chinese Labour Unions’), an ethnic Chinese trade union organisation.

Ko's politics, while progressive, did not go far enough for more left-leaning members of the PTI – including Liem, Tan Ling Djie and Tjoa Sik Ien – who, espousing socialist or even communist sympathies, advocated anti-Dutch Indonesian nationalism and rejected cooperation with the Dutch colonial state. Ko also clashed with Liem in the former's decision to open the PTI not just to Indies-born Chinese, but to all ethnic Chinese residents of the Indies, including totok Chinese. In the lead-up to the 1939 Volksraad election, this conflict erupted into the open and led to Ko's expulsion from the PTI.

=== Post-war career and death ===
After the Japanese occupation of the Indies (1942–1945) during World War II, Ko joined the Partai Nasional Indonesia (PNI) of his Indonesian Leiden contemporaries in 1945, but did not further his political involvement. Ko served instead as head of the Balai Harta Peninggalan (the ‘Public Trustee Office’) in Central Java until retiring in 1960. He subsequently became a university lecturer at a number of universities, particularly Universitas Diponegoro.

Having been widowed, Ko married his former secretary Roemini around 1947 and converted to Islam, taking the Muslim name Mohamad Saleh. He died in Semarang on 17 June 1970.

== See also ==
- Partai Tionghoa Indonesia
- Soetardjo Petition
- Liem Koen Hian
- Chung Hwa Hui
- H. H. Kan
- Partai Nasional Indonesia
