= Chung Hwa Hui =

Political party in the Dutch East Indies (1928–1942)

Chung Hwa Hui 中華會
- Leader: Hok Hoei Kan; Majoor Khouw Kim An; Han Tiauw Tjong; Loa Sek Hie; Oei Tjong Hauw; Thio Thiam Tjong; Phoa Liong Gie
- Chairman: Hok Hoei Kan
- Founded: 1928
- Dissolved: 1942
- Succeeded by: Partai Demokrat Tionghoa Indonesia (PDTI)
- Headquarters: Batavia, Dutch East Indies
- Ideology: Pro-Dutch camp Racial equality Chinese nationalism Three Principles of the People Conservatism
- Political position: Centre-right to right-wing

Chung Hwa Hui (CHH; lit. 'Chinese Association') was a conservative, largely pro-Dutch political organization and party in the Dutch East Indies (today Indonesia), often criticised as a mouthpiece of the colonial Chinese establishment. The party campaigned for legal equality between the colony's ethnic Chinese subjects and Europeans, and advocated ethnic Chinese political participation in the Dutch colonial state. The CHH was led by scions of the 'Cabang Atas' gentry, including its founding president, H. H. Kan, and supported by ethnic Chinese conglomerates, such as the powerful Kian Gwan multinational.

The party's close relationship with, and allegiance to, the Dutch colonial state is clearly demonstrated by the fact that CHH was represented in the Volksraad – the embryonic legislature of the Dutch East Indies – all through the party's entire existence from 1928 until 1942. In the study of colonial Chinese-Indonesian politics, CHH is most often contrasted with the so-called Sin Po group, which called for loyalty to the pre-war Republic of China, and the Partai Tionghoa Indonesia (PTI: the 'Chinese-Indonesian Party'), which promoted ethnic Chinese participation in the Indonesian nationalist movement and demanded Indonesian nationality for all Indonesians.

== History ==
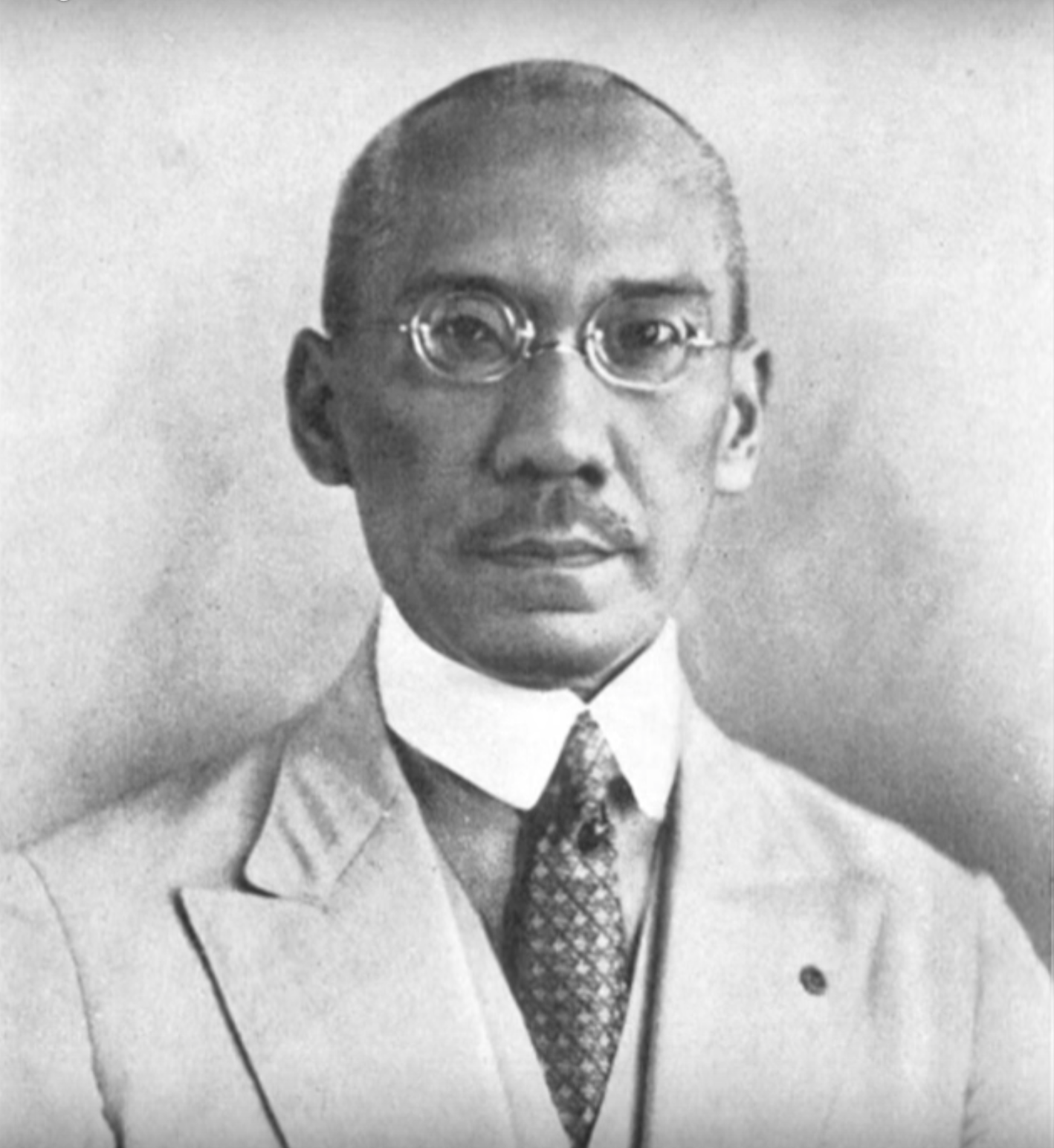
The statesman, parliamentarian and landlord H. H. Kan, founding president of CHH

Founded in 1928 after preliminary congresses through 1926 and 1927, CHH was loosely associated with the eponymous Chung Hwa Hui Nederland, a Peranakan student association in the Netherlands, established in 1911 in Leiden. Throughout its existence, CHH was dominated by its founding and only president H. H. Kan, a patrician doyen of the Cabang Atas. Members of the party's founding executive committee consisted of other scions of the Cabang Atas, such as Khouw Kim An, the 5th Majoor der Chinezen of Batavia, Han Tiauw Tjong and Loa Sek Hie, or representatives of ethnic Chinese conglomerates, including Oei Tjong Hauw, head of Kian Gwan, Asia's largest multinational at the time, and the Semarang business tycoon Thio Thiam Tjong. Due to its elitist leadership, CHH was referred to by critics as the 'Packard Club' after the expensive cars many of its leaders used. The general membership of the political party was drawn largely from Dutch-educated, upper and upper-middle class Peranakan circles.

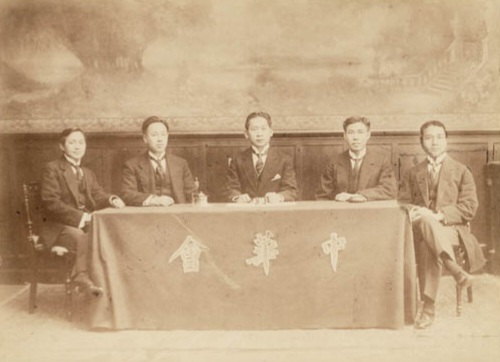
Founders of the Chung Hwa Hui, then a student organization in the Netherlands (1915)

Chung Hwa Hui was loyal to the Dutch East Indies and supported Indies nationality, but campaigned vigorously for legal equality with Europeans for the colony's Chinese subjects. To this end, the party advocated ethnic Chinese participation in colonial Indonesian politics: until the Japanese invasion in 1942, the majority of ethnic Chinese members of the Volksraad were CHH leaders. H. H. Kan articulated in his Dutch maiden speech to the Volksraad in 1918 a position that later came to define CHH:

"Our group is very thankful for all the improvements in the position of the Chinese thus far, but entire satisfaction can only come with complete legal equality with Europeans.

"[A]lthough the Chinese population group...is still not completely satisfied, a large proportion of this group nevertheless values the steps taken to improve its position in society.

"I speak here of that vast majority, the practical and soberly thinking part of this industrious group, who...keeps its cool and fully realizes that the link with the former fatherland does not need to be broken in order to protect its own real interests in the country whose welfare is so closely tied to its own existence. Without having to renounce one's race, without having to be unfaithful to what has been called by an English writer 'the religion of the seed', each must consider it a duty to oneself and towards his fellow inhabitants to give his best for the progress of the country and for the improvement of the people, to whom also the Chinese are thankfully indebted".

Despite their conservative reputation, the party's Volksraad members, led by H. H. Kan, voted in favour of the Soetardjo Petition of 1936, widely seen as progressive, which requested Indonesian independence as part of a Dutch commonwealth under the Dutch Monarchy. CHH members in the Volksraad did, however, oppose widening the electoral franchise for elections to the legislature to either more indigenous people (H. H. Kan) or to women (Loa Sek Hie). They maintained an ambiguous, and sometimes dismissive, stance on the emancipation of Indonesia's indigenous population.

CHH's cultural outlook was both Peranakan and Dutch, as reflected in the party's two languages of communication: Dutch and Malay. At the same time, the party – which used a Mandarin Chinese name – also valorised the retention of ethnic Chinese heritage and ties to the ancestral land. In keeping with CHH's political commitment to the Dutch East Indies, however, they also promoted the use of Dutch, instead of Chinese or Malay, as the language of instruction for ethnic Chinese education in the country. In the historian Leo Suryadinata's words, the party favoured a 'Peranakan Chinese culture with a Dutch flavour'.

Chung Hwa Hui's close identification with the Dutch colonial state drew the criticism of many in the Chinese-Indonesian community and beyond, in particular reformist voices more sympathetic to the Indonesian nationalist movement and indigenous Indonesian emancipation. Sukarno, later first President of Indonesia, mocked the party as the 'yellow Vaderlandsche Club' in reference to an ultra-right wing Dutch colonial organisation of diehard 'imperialists'. In 1932, this dissatisfaction with CHH within the Chinese-Indonesian community resulted in the founding of an opposition, pro-Indonesian party, Partai Tionghoa Indonesia, led by the leftwing newspaper men and progressive activists Liem Koen Hian, Kwee Thiam Tjing, Ong Liang Kok and Ko Kwat Tiong. The new PTI gained the support of parts of lower and middle class Peranakan society, and won a seat in 1935 election to the Volksraad, though without ever challenging CHH's overall majority in the legislature's ethnic Chinese ranks.

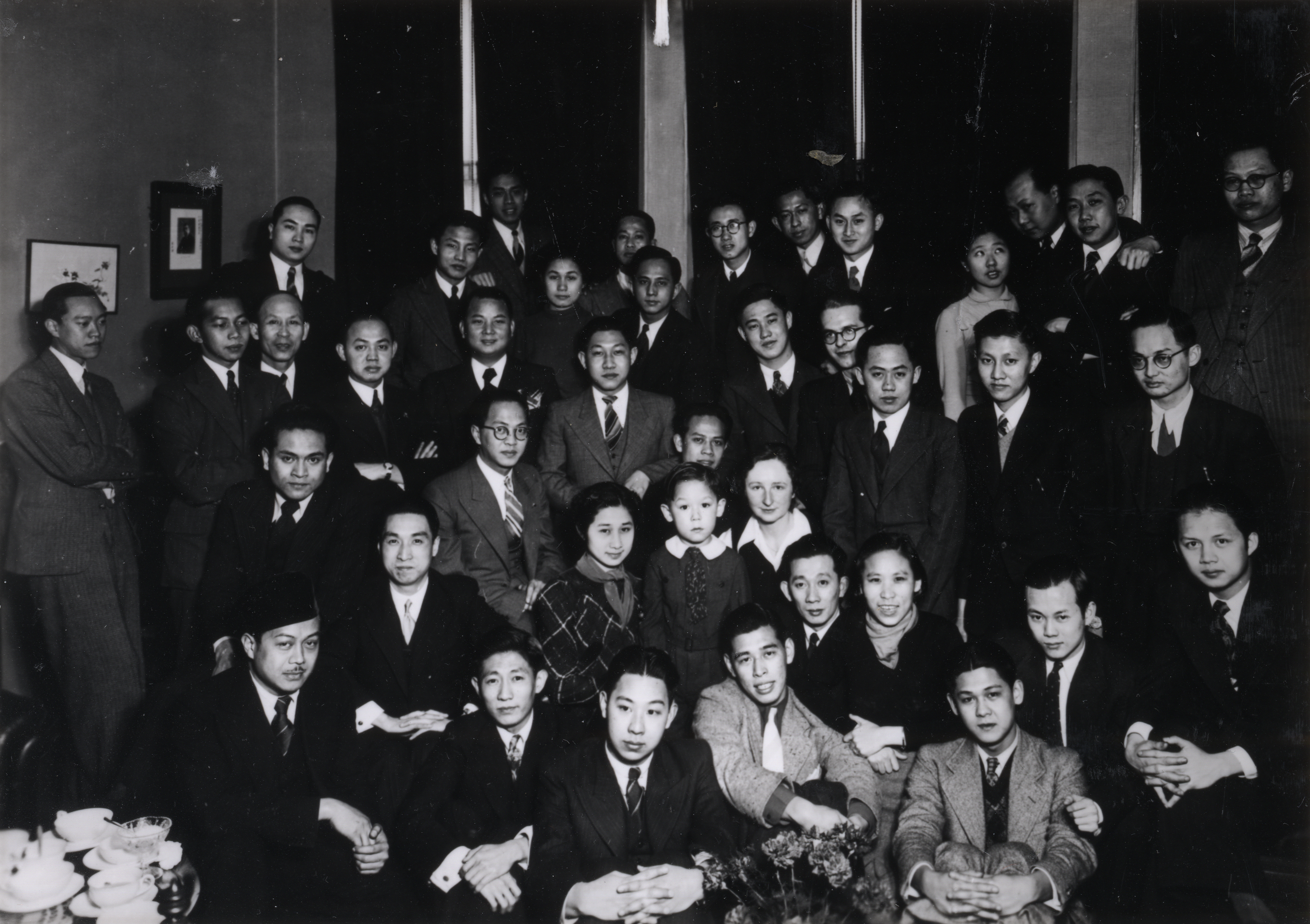
Meeting of Chung Hwa Hui members in 1939, discussing recent events in China.

Even within CHH, nonetheless, the party hierarchy's pro-establishment views were challenged by the Leiden University-educated lawyer Phoa Liong Gie, leader of CHH's more progressive youth wing. Phoa, who indicated a willingness to support the Indonesian nationalist movement, resigned from CHH in 1934, citing H. H. Kan's dominance of the party; and was appointed to the Volksraad in 1939 as an independent member. CHH's elitist reputation alienated others, even in Dutch-educated circles, such as another Leiden alumnus and lawyer, Yap Thiam Hien, later a human rights activist, whom CHH attempted to recruit as a member, but who refused due to his reservations about the party's elitist and moneyed profile.

CHH was disbanded following the Japanese invasion of 1942 as part of World War II. During the Indonesian revolution of 1945–1950 that followed the end of the war, CHH's surviving membership rallied around former CHH leader Thio Thiam Tjong, who in 1948 founded Persatoean Tionghoa (the 'Chinese Union'), called from 1950 onwards Partai Demokrat Tionghoa Indonesia (PDTI: the 'Chinese Indonesian Democratic Party'). The new outfit was, in effect, the institutional heir to Chung Hwa Hui's political and social legacy. What was seen as the new party's CHH heritage, pro-colonial legacy and pro-western stance did not bode well for PDTI, which came to be regarded as irrelevant in post-revolutionary and increasingly anti-western Indonesia. PDTI never received much electoral support, and was eventually disbanded in 1965 with the military coup of General Soeharto and the end of all semblance of parliamentary democracy.

== See also ==
- Volkraad
- Partai Tionghoa Indonesia
- H. H. Kan
- Khouw Kim An, Majoor der Chinezen
- Loa Sek Hie
- Phoa Liong Gie
- Cabang Atas
- Kian Gwan
