= Vishakha (disambiguation) =

Vishākhā (विशाखा), meaning "forked, having many branches", is the 16th nakshatra in Indian astronomy. Vishakha, Visakha, or Vishaka may also refer to:

- Visakha, a patron and disciple of the Buddha
- Visakhapatnam, a city in Andhra Pradesh
- Vesak or Visakha Puja, a Buddhist holiday
- Visakha FC, Cambodian football club
- Visakha Stadium, Cambodian football stadium
- Visakha Volleyball Club, volleyball team based in Bangkok

== People with the given name ==
- Vishakha N. Desai (1949–), American academic
- Vishakha Hari (1978–), Indian vocalist
- Vishakha Raut, Indian politician
- Vishakha Singh (1986–), Indian actress
- Vishaka Siriwardana (1956–2021), Sri Lankan actress
- Vishakha Subhedar (1976–), Marathi actress
- Vishakha Tripathi (1949–2024), Indian religious leader
- Visakha Wijeyeratne (1935–1999), Sri Lankan artist
- Njonja Tjoa Hin Hoei (c. 1907–1990), Indonesian journalist also known as Visakha Gunadharma
