= Partai Tionghoa Indonesia =

Partai Tionghoa Indonesia 印度尼西亞中華黨
- Leader: Liem Koen Hian; Ko Kwat Tiong; Kwee Thiam Tjing; Ong Liang Kok; Tan Ling Djie; Tjoa Sik Ien
- President: Liem Koen Hian (1932–1934); Ko Kwat Tiong (1934–1939)
- Secretary: Kwee Thiam Tjing
- Founder: Liem Koen Hian
- Founded: 1932
- Dissolved: 1942
- Succeeded by: Persatuan Tenaga Indonesia
- Headquarters: Surabaya, Dutch East Indies
- Ideology: Indonesian nationalism Socialism
- Political position: Centre-left to Left-wing

Partai Tionghoa Indonesia
- Traditional Chinese: 印度尼西亞中華黨
- Simplified Chinese: 印度尼西亚中华党
Transcriptions
Standard Mandarin
- Hanyu Pinyin: Yìndùníxīyà zhōnghuá dǎng

The Partai Tionghoa Indonesia (English: Chinese Indonesian Party; Chinese: 印度尼西亞中華黨) was a left-wing political party in the Dutch East Indies during the Great Depression. Influenced by the growing Indonesian nationalist movement, it proposed a third way beyond the pro-China and pro-Dutch parties which had existed among the Indonesian Chinese until then. The PTI advocated for Indonesian citizenship for Chinese Indonesians and closer political ties to Indigenous Indonesians (pribumi or bumiputera).

The party was created in September 1932 as a result of the dispute over whether Chinese Indonesians should aspire to Dutch citizenship or whether they should remain citizens of the Republic of China. This debate had been going on since the birth of the Chinese republic in 1911. As well, the drive to found the PTI came from the lower classes of Indies Chinese who felt excluded from politics. By the 1930s Peranakan Chinese politics in the Dutch East Indies were dominated by the Chung Hwa Hui, a rightwing political party seen as a mouthpiece of the pro-Dutch and conservative colonial Chinese establishment. The party's leaders, H. H. Kan and Loa Sek Hie, advocated cooperation with, and participation in, the Dutch colonial state. The Sin Po faction, which advocated allegiance to mainland China, wanted to stay out of Indies politics altogether. However, a small faction in the late 1920s and early 1930s led by Liem Koen Hian, editor of the papers Sin Tit Po and Soeara Publiek, influenced by the Indische Partij, advocated for Indisch Burderschap (Dutch: Indies citizenship) for the Indies Chinese. By 1932 he was calling it Indonesiërschap (Dutch: Indonesian citizenship).

So, in 1932 Liem along with Kwee Thiam Tjing, Ong Liang Kok and other Surabaya Peranakan Chinese founded the PTI with the support of some moderate Indonesian nationalists such as Soetomo and Suroso. Their platform aspired to reform the Dutch East Indies to the point where there was racial equality between the Dutch, Pribumi and Indonesian Chinese. However, like the Chung Hwa Hui they excluded Totok Chinese (foreign-born Chinese) from voting rights in the party.

In 1934, the Leiden-educated lawyer Ko Kwat Tiong, hitherto chairman of the PTI's Semarang branch, was voted to succeed Liem as president of the entire party. The PTI elected Ko, its only member to the Volksraad in the 1935 election. Ko opened up the PTI to Totok Chinese members, and as the party's representative in the Volksraad, was one of the six initiators and signatories of the Soetardjo Petition of 1936, which requested Indonesian independence as part of a Dutch commonwealth.

Liem Koen Hian had a falling-out with his Indonesian nationalist ally Dr. Sutomo in 1936 after the latter visited Japan and praised its government. As a Chinese nationalist, Liem accused Sutomo of spreading Japanese propaganda. A personality clash between Liem and Ko Kwat Tiong also arose, causing Liem to leave the PTI in 1939 for the Gerindo party. With the Japanese invasion of the Dutch East Indies in 1942, the party essentially ended and was not recreated after Indonesian independence in 1949.
