= Liem Bwan Tjie =

Indonesian architect (1891–1966)

Liem Bwan Tjie (6 September 1891 – 28 July 1966) was a prominent architect, and a pioneering figure of modern Indonesian architecture. He belonged to the first generation of professionally trained Indonesian architects.

== Early life and education ==
Liem was born in Semarang into a Peranakan Chinese family. His father, Liem Tjing Swie, was a successful textile merchant, and thus able to give his children a good Dutch education. Between 1920 and 1926, he studied architecture at the Delft University of Technology in the Netherlands and the Ecole Nationale Superieure des Beaux Arts in Paris. He also gained experience while in Europe, working for a few leading architects of the day, such as Michel de Klerk and Eduard Cuypers. In 1926, he went to the Harvard-Yenching Institute in Peking to prepare for a career as a university lecturer. His life in China was cut short by the chaos of the Sino-Japanese War.

== Career in Indonesia ==
In 1929, Liem returned home to the Dutch East Indies. The colonial authorities were initially reluctant to allow him to settle back in his homeland due to Liem's perceived leftist sympathies. His return was eventually facilitated by character references given by a number of community leaders, including the parliamentarian Loa Sek Hie. Liem was obliged not to engage in political activities. At first, he was also compelled to stay at Loa's residence in Menteng before eventually being allowed to return home to Semarang.

His work can be divided into two periods: his pre- and post-Second World War work. His pre-war work was influenced by the Amsterdam School, but he was always respectful of the tropical environment. His interiors betrayed the influence of the Arts and Crafts Movement, as well as the vocabulary of Chinese decorative traditions. A lot of his buildings before the Second World War were commissioned by prominent members of the 'Cabang Atas', or the established Chinese elite of colonial Indonesia. These included the politician Loa Sek Hie; the businessman Oei Tjong Hauw, son of Asia's wealthiest tycoon Majoor Oei Tiong Ham; their family company, the powerful multinational corporation Kian Gwan; the politician Han Tiauw Tjong and the landlord Tan Liok Tiauw. His work was interrupted by the Japanese Occupation, after which he moved yet again to Batavia.

His post-war work included many state commissions for the newly independent Republic of Indonesia. Many of these new commissions were of national scale and importance, and reflect a minimalist kind of functionalism and sensibility. In 1959, Liem, together with Friedrich Silaban and other pioneering architects founded the Ikatan Arsitek Indonesia, or the Indonesian Institute of Architects.

In 1965, he left Indonesia for the Netherlands with his family in order to ensure a good education for his daughters. During his trip there, Liem fell ill and died in Rijswijk in on July 28, 1966.

== Selected works ==
In the book ‘Indische Bouwkunst’ more than forty-five buildings designed by Liem Bwan Tjie are mentioned. This book has been translated into Bahasa Indonesia and is available as a free download.

- Ikada Stadium
- House for Loa Sek Hie (1929)
- Headquarters of Kian Gwan (the Oei Tiong Ham Concern)(1930)
- Villa Oei Tjong Hauw, son of Oei Tiong Ham (1931)
- Villa Han Tiauw Tjong (1932)
- Villa Tan Liok Tiauw (1939 - 1940)
- The Leper Hospital, Tangerang (1950)
- Ikada Sport Stadium, Jakarta (1951)
- Teladan Sport Stadium, Medan (1953)
- Ministry of Agriculture, Jakarta (1956)
- National Police Headquarters, Jakarta (1960)
- Campus of the North Sulawesi University, Manado (1961)
- Hospital of Ambon (1962)

== Bibliography ==
- den Dikken, Judy (2002). Liem Bwan Tjie (1891-1966): westerse vernieuwing en oosterse traditie. Rotterdam: Stichting Bonas. ISBN 9076643148.
- Nas, Peter (2006). The Past in the Present: Architecture in Indonesia. NAi (University of Michigan). ISBN 9056625721.
- Suryadinata, Leo (1995). Prominent Indonesian Chinese: Biographical Sketches. Singapore: Institute of Southeast Asian Studies. ISBN 978-981-3055-04-9.
- Suryadinata, Leo (2012). Southeast Asian Personalities of Chinese Descent: A Biographical Dictionary, Volume I & II. Singapore: Institute of Southeast Asian Studies. ISBN 978-9814345217.
- Norbruis, Obbe (2021). Indische Bouwkunst, architecten en hun oeuvre in Nederlands-Indië en Indonesië in de eerste helft van de 20ste eeuw. Volendam: LM Publishers. ISBN 9789460220296.
