= Phoa Liong Gie =

Phoa Liong Gie Sia
- Born: 1905; Bandung, West Java, Dutch East Indies
- Died: 1983 (aged 77–78); Switzerland
- Education: Meester in de rechten
- Alma mater: Leiden University
- Occupations: Politician, jurist, newspaper owner and editor
- Years active: 1920s-1940s
- Spouse: Laura Charlotte Ongkiehong
- Relatives: Phoa Tjeng Tjoan, Kapitein der Chinezen (great-grandfather); Phoa Keng Hek Sia (great-uncle); Phoa Liong Djin (cousin)

Phoa Liong Gie Sia (simplified Chinese: 潘隆义舍; traditional Chinese: 潘隆義舍; pinyin: Pān Lóngyì Shè: born in Bandung on June 4, 1905 – died on January 14, 1983, in Switzerland) was an Indonesian-born Swiss jurist, politician and newspaper owner of the late colonial era in the Dutch East Indies.

== Background and education ==
He was born in 1905 into a prominent family of Peranakan Chinese roots, part of the Cabang Atas or the Chinese gentry of colonial Indonesia. His great-grandfather, Phoa Tjeng Tjoan, served as Kapitein der Chinezen of Buitenzorg (now Bogor) from 1866 until 1878. This was a post in the colonial civil administration with political and legal jurisdiction over the local Chinese community. Phoa was styled 'Sia' from birth as the descendant of a Chinese officer. Phoa was also a great-nephew of the prominent community leader and landlord, Phoa Keng Hek Sia.

The younger Phoa was educated at the Europeesche Lagere School (European lower school) in Garut, and at the Hogere Burgerschool (higher civic school) in Batavia. Both institutions admitted only the children of elite Europeans and a small number of select non-Europeans. Phoa subsequently studied at the Rechtshoogeschool (law school) in Batavia before continuing his education at Leiden University in the Netherlands. He graduated as a Meester in de rechten (‘Master of Laws’) in 1925.

== Legal and political career ==
Upon returning to Bandung in 1927, Phoa joined the legal practice of the leading Dutch lawyer C. W. Wormser. A year later in 1928, Phoa moved to Batavia in order to open his own law firm.

Following in the footsteps of his great-grandfather and great-uncle, Phoa also went into politics. He was a vocal leader of the younger faction of Chung Hwa Hui (CHH), a centre-right political party seen by many as a mouthpiece of the Chinese establishment in colonial Indonesia.

Phoa came into conflict with some of the policies of the older party leadership, represented by the senior parliamentarians H. H. Kan and Loa Sek Hie. Phoa resented his party leaders’ pro-Dutch sympathies, and advocated Chinese neutrality in the Indonesian struggle for independence. Phoa even indicated his willingness to support Indonesian nationalism in the right set of circumstances. Following an open conflict in 1934 with H. H. Kan, over the latter's supposed dominance over CHH, Phoa resigned his membership of the party.

He maintained, however, his political involvement. On May 8, 1939, Phoa was appointed by the Dutch authorities to the ‘Volksraad’ (the colonial parliament of Indonesia), and took his seat as an independent member.

After the Second World War, between 1946 and 1948, Phoa acted as a legal advisor and delegate of the Netherlands at the Economic and Social Council of the United Nations in New York and Geneva.

== Newspaper proprietor ==
Around the time of his move to Batavia in 1928, Phoa also became active in the burgeoning news media and public discourse of colonial Indonesia. In 1930, he acquired a daily newspaper, Perniagaan, whose name he changed to Siang Po. This was the beginning of Siang Po Printing Press, which would acquire or create more publications in due course. A year later, in 1931, Phoa's company bought another daily, Panorama, which had been founded by the writer and journalist Kwee Tek Hoay.

After Phoa resigned from the CHH in 1934, his newspapers assumed an increasingly sympathetic tone towards the Indonesian nationalist movement. The editorial board of Panorama included such leading nationalists as Sanusi Pane, Amir Sjarifuddin and Mohammad Yamin, with the prominent journalist, Liem Koen Hian, as chief editor. Liem, as well as Saeroen, also contributed to Siang Po. In mid-1936, Liem, Pane, Sjarifuddin and Yamin founded yet another daily, Kebangoenan, which Siang Po Printing Press likewise printed.

Phoa was also the owner of two further publications, the magazines Si Pao and Kong Hwa Po, the last of which was similarly under Liem's editorial oversight.

== Personal life ==
Phoa was married Laura Charlotte Ongkiehong, daughter of the Ambon-based newspaper owner and magnate, Ong Kie Hong, and granddaughter of Njio Tek Liem, Luitenant der Chinezen of Ambon ('Lieutenant of the Chinese'). Together with his family, Phoa later moved to Switzerland, where he spent the remainder of his life.

== Major works ==
- De rechtstoestand der Chineezen in Indonesië (in Dutch) [English: 'The Legal Position of the Chinese in Indonesia']. Chung Hwa Hui Tsa Chih, jaargang V, October–November (1926): 56-60.
- Aliran-Aliran dalam Siahwee Tionghoa (Lezing dari Mr. Phoa Liong Gie dalem Pauze dari Soiree Musicale Chung Hwa Hui Afd. Batavia (in Malay) [English: 'Various Streams within the Chinese Community (Speech by Mr. Phoa Liong Gie during the Interval of a Musical Soiree of Chung Hua Hui, Batavia Branch']. Batavia: Drukkerij Siang Po (1932): no page number.
- De Economische Positie der Chineezen in Nederlandsch-Indië (In Dutch) [English: 'The changing economic position of the Chinese in Netherlands India']. Koloniale Studiën 5:6 (1936): 97–119.

== See also ==
- Volksraad, the first legislature in colonial Indonesia
- Hok Hoei Kan, fellow parliamentarian, member of Chung Hua Hui and political rival
- Loa Sek Hie, fellow parliamentarian, member of Chung Hua Hui and political rival
- Mohammad Yamin, fellow parliamentarian and colleague at Siang Po Printing Press
- Amir Sjarifuddin, colleague at Siang Po Printing Press
- Sanusi Pane, colleague at Siang Po Printing Press
