= Asian Culture (journal) =

- Discipline: Asian studies; Interdisciplinary
- Language: English, Chinese
- Edited by: Leo Suryadinata, Neo Peng Fu, Jack Meng-Tat Chia

Publication details
- History: 1983–present
- Publisher: Singapore Society of Asian Studies (Singapore)
- Frequency: Annual

Standard abbreviations
- ISO 4: Asian Cult.

Indexing
- ISSN: 0217-6742
- OCLC no.: 607497422

Links
- Journal homepage

Asian Culture (Yazhou Wenhua, 亞洲文化) is an international refereed bilingual academic journal published by the Singapore Society of Asian Studies.

Asian Culture was inaugurated in February 1983 and has published a total of 44 issues by 2020. It is an international refereed journal that publishes quality research papers in all aspects of Asia within the disciplines of anthropology, art history, history, literature, music, politics, and religious studies. It is a well-regarded journal in the field of Southeast Asian studies.

The current editors are Leo Suryadinata, Neo Peng Fu, and Jack Meng-Tat Chia.
