= Soetardjo Kartohadikusumo =

Indonesian politician (1890–1976)

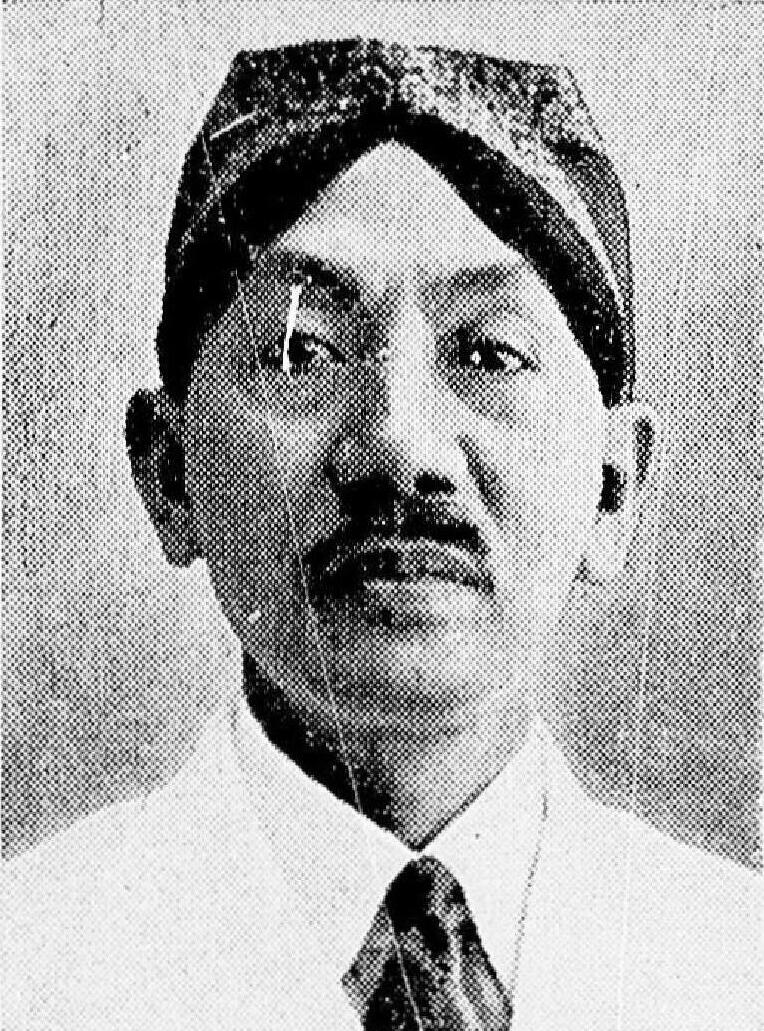
- Portrait, c. 1942–1943

4th Chairman of the Supreme Advisory Council
- In office 10 November 1948 – 17 August 1950
- President: Sukarno
- Preceded by: Ario Soerjo
- Succeeded by: Sukarno (1959)

1st Governor of West Java
- In office 6 September 1945 – December 1945
- Preceded by: Office established
- Succeeded by: Mohammad Djamin

2nd Chairman of the Indonesian Red Cross Society
- In office 1946–1948
- Preceded by: Mohammad Hatta
- Succeeded by: Bintoro

Other offices
- 1931–1942: Member of the Volksraad
- 1945: Member of the Investigating Committee for Preparatory Work for Independence
- 1945: Member of the Preparatory Committee for Indonesian Independence

Personal details
- Born: 22 October 1890 Blora, Dutch East Indies
- Died: 20 December 1976 (aged 86) Jakarta, Indonesia
- Education: Opleiding School Voor Inlandsche Ambtenaren

Soetardjo Kartohadikusumo (22 October 1890 – 20 December 1976) was an Indonesian politician who served as the first Governor of West Java between September and December 1945, early in the Indonesian National Revolution. Having worked under the Dutch East Indies colonial government for 20 years, he became a member of the Volksraad where he was best known for his 1936 Soetardjo Petition. He was also a member of the Investigating Committee for Preparatory Work for Independence (BPUPK).

== Early life and education ==
Soetardjo was born on 22 October 1890 in the village of Kunduran, within what is today Blora Regency. He was the sixth of eight siblings. His father Kartoredjo was a district chief in Tuban. He began attending a Europeesche Lagere School (elementary school) at the age of 8, despite the age limit for such schools being 6; according to a book later published by the Ministry of Education and Culture, Kartohadikusumo "had to be made 2 years younger" to fit this age limit. He continued to study at a school for native bureaucrats (Opleiding School Voor Inlandsche Ambtenaren) in Magelang, during which he joined Budi Utomo and became chairman of its local office.

== Career ==
=== Colonial period ===
After a one-month internship, he was appointed as an assistant scribe at the Rembang Residency office in 1911. He was later relocated to the regency office of Bojonegoro and later Blora, serving as assistant to the district (wedana) chiefs between 1913 and 1921. During this job, he attended the Government School (Bestuurschool) in Batavia between 1919 and 1921. By 1924, Soetardjo had been promoted to the district chief of Sambong in Blora, and by 1929 he was Vicegerent of Gresik.

In 1931, Soetardjo was appointed to the Volksraad, representing the native bureaucrats. At that time, he was chairman of the native bureaucrats' association (Persatuan Pegawai Bestuur Bumiputra). It was in this office that he made the 1936 Soetardjo Petition, which called for greater native autonomy in the Dutch East Indies. Soetardjo later cited the repression of left-wing political leaders following the De Zeven Provinciën mutiny in 1933, and the weakening of the native Indonesian Sultanate of Yogyakarta and Surakarta Sunanate as his motivations for the petition.

During the Japanese occupation of the Dutch East Indies, Soetardjo was appointed in 1943 as a resident of the Jakarta area (which also covered surrounding areas of Karawang, Cikampek, Tangerang, and Purwakarta, and he was also appointed to the Investigating Committee for Preparatory Work for Independence (BPUPK). He also held a rank within the Defenders of the Homeland (PETA) militia. Further, in 1945, he also became a member of the Preparatory Committee for Indonesian Independence. Soetardjo was a proponent of the Greater Indonesia concept during his time at BPUPK. During his residency of Jakarta, Soetardjo promoted land reform, seizing land from landlords for peasant cultivation and working with a Japanese agricultural scientist to increase yields. Soetardjo also imposed government control of rice distribution.

=== Post-independence ===
After the proclamation of Indonesian independence, Soetardjo retained his office as resident of Jakarta, holding the position from 19 August to 23 September 1945. He was then appointed Republican governor of West Java on 6 September 1945. At that time, he was considered as the spokesman for the interests of the native bureaucracy, and he assured Sukarno and Mohammad Hatta of their support. His governorship was based in Jakarta, and following the city's occupation by Allied forces, the governorship was transferred to Mohammad Djamin. Aside from his governorship, he served as deputy chairman of the Central Indonesian National Committee, and was also chairman of the Indonesian Red Cross between 1946 and 1948.

He later joined the Provisional People's Representative Council after the conclusion of the revolution. Later, he was appointed to the Supreme Advisory Council, becoming its chairman. He died on 20 December 1976 in Jakarta.

Political offices
New title	Governor of West Java; 1945	Succeeded by Mohammad Djamin
