= Kan Keng Tjong =

Chinese-Indonesian tycoon

Kang Keng Tjong (22 June, 1797—May 11, 1871), also spelt Kan Keng Tiong, was a Chinese-Indonesian tycoon and one of the richest men in Batavia, capital of the Dutch East Indies (now known as Indonesia).

Born in Zhangzhou, Fujian, Qing Empire, he migrated to the East Indies in the early nineteenth century. He was involved in sugar and rice trading, and became an important Landheer or landlord in the east of Batavia. Among others, he owned the particuliere landen or private domains of Bekasi, Karang Tjongok, Papisangan, Gaboes and Loewong. He was raised by the Qing imperial government to the rank of mandarin of the third rank.

Kan was married three times to locally-born Peranakan Chinese women: Siauw Po Nio in 1831, Oeij Thu Nio in 1844 and Jo Heng Nio in 1848. He died in Batavia in 1871. His widow, Jo Heng Nio, founded in 1897 the Maatschappij tot Exploitatie van vastigheden Jo Heng Nio en Kan Keng Tiong, a company to manage the family's vast landholdings.

Kan's widow, Jo Heng Nio, was a niece of a Chinese officer, Jo Teng Kong, Luitenant-titulair der Chinezen; and many of Kan's children married into families of the 'Cabang Atas' gentry of colonial Indonesia. His daughter, Kan Oe Nio, was married to Han Oen Lee, Luitenant der Chinezen of Bekasi; and another daughter, Kan Pan Nio, was married to Lie Tjoe Hong, the 3rd Majoor der Chinezen of Batavia. His son, Kan Tjeng Soen, was married to Khouw Tjoei Nio, daughter of Khouw Tjeng Tjoan, Luitenant-titulair der Chinezen and an older sister of Khouw Kim An, 5th Majoor der Chinezen of Batavia. Through his daughter, Oe Nio, he became the grandfather of Hok Hoei Kan, arguably the most important Chinese-Indonesian statesman of the late colonial period.
