= Han Oen Lee =

Han Oen Lee, Luitenant der Chinezen
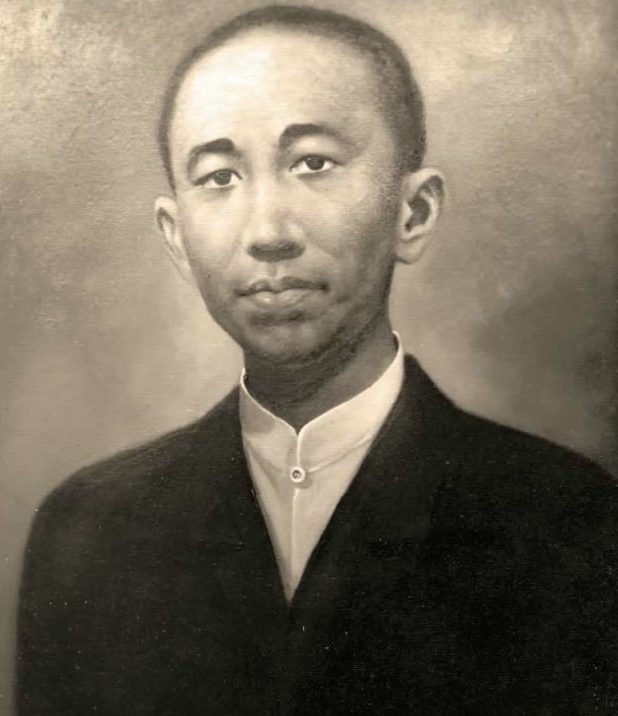
- Han Oen Lee, Luitenant der Chinezen

Luitenant der Chinezen of Bekasi
- In office 1886 – 1893 (died in office)
- Preceded by: Luitenant Tan Kang Ie
- Constituency: Bekasi

Personal details
- Born: 1856 Surabaya, East Java, Dutch East Indies
- Died: 1893 (aged 36–37) Batavia, Dutch East Indies
- Spouse: Kan Oe Nio
- Relations: Kan Keng Tjong (father-in-law); Lie Tjoe Hong, Majoor der Chinezen (brother-in-law); Han Khee Bing, Luitenant der Chinezen (great-great-grandfather); Han Bwee Kong, Kapitein der Chinezen (great-great-great-grandfather)
- Children: Han Khing Bie (1878—1964); Hok Hoei Kan (1881—1951); Han Tek Nio (1883—1969)
- Parent: Han Tjoei Hing Sia (father)
- Occupation: Mandarin
- Known for: Role as the first Luitenant der Chinezen of Bekasi and a leading, colonial landlord

Han Oen Lee, Luitenant der Chinezen (1856—1893) was a magnate of Chinese descent in the Dutch East Indies, who governed the Chinese community of Bekasi as its Luitenant der Chinezen, an important administrative post in the Dutch colonial bureaucracy. He was also the Landheer (landlord) of the particuliere land (private domain) of Gaboes. Today, he is best known as the father of the late colonial statesman Hok Hoei Kan (1881—1951).

Born in Surabaya, East Java, Dutch East Indies in 1856, Han Oen Lee Sia came from the influential Han family of Lasem, part of the 'Cabang Atas' gentry of colonial Indonesia. His father, Han Tjoei Hing Sia (died in 1882), was a local landlord and a great-grandson of Han Khee Bing, Luitenant der Chinezen (1749—1768), who was in turn the eldest son of Han Bwee Kong, Kapitein der Chinezen of Surabaya (1727—1778), an important ally and comprador of the Dutch East India Company. As the issue of a long line of Chinese officers, Han bore the hereditary title of Sia from birth.

On 8 March 1876, Han married the heiress Kan Oe Nio (1850—1910), who was six years his senior, at the bride's hometown of Batavia, capital of the Dutch East Indies. Han's wife was a daughter of one of the colony's wealthiest tycoons, Kan Keng Tjong (1797—1871), and Jo Heng Nio (1827—1900), as well as a sister-in-law of Lie Tjoe Hong, the 3rd Majoor der Chinezen of Batavia. Han and his wife had three children: Han Khing Bie Sia (1878—1864), Han Khing Tjiang Sia (later known as Hok Hoei Kan) and Han Tek Nio (1883—1969).

On 15 April 1886, Han Oen Lee Sia was appointed by the Dutch colonial government to the post of Luitenant der Chinezen of Bekasi, a district located east of Batavia, in the region of Han's private domain of Gaboes (now in Bekasi Regency). There, Luitenant Han Oen Lee introduced a new variety of rice from Fujian in southern China, which had larger grains and produced a more plentiful harvest. Han also operated a steam-powered rice mill on the estate.

Luitenant Han Oen Lee served in his government position until his untimely death due to a major fire in Batavia's Chinese quarter, Glodok, in 1893. Family lore recounts how the Luitenant climbed up to the roof of his family house, holding two sacred family krises, named Pangeran Api (prince of fire) and Pangeran Angin (prince of wind), thus magically diverting the fire away. Jakarta folklore has it that the fire leapt over the Molenvliet canal thanks to the magical power of the krises. Han, however, died from fire-related injuries a few days later.

On his death, his eldest son, Han Khing Bie Sia, inherited Gaboes. His younger son, Han Khing Tjiang Sia, was adopted by his childless brother-in-law, Kan Tjeng Soen (1855—1896), renamed Kan Hok Hoei Sia and was made the principal heir of the name and fortune of the latter's maternal grandfather, Kan Keng Tjong. Han's youngest son, as Hok Hoei Kan, became a leading politician of the late colonial period.

== Ancestry ==
Ancestors of Han Oen Lee

16. Han Khee Bing, Luitenant der Chinezen (1746–1768)
8. Han Soe Sik, Luitenant-Kapitein der Chinezen (1767–1827)
17. Nj. Luitenant Han Khee Bing
4. Han Tiauw Kie, Luitenant der Chinezen (1790–1871)
9. Nj. Luitenant-Kapitein Han Soe Sik (née Liem Tjien Bok) (1769–1842)
2. Han Tjoei Hing Sia (d. 1882)
5. Nj. Luitenant Han Tiauw Kie (née Yap) (1798–1841)
1. Han Oen Lee, Luitenant der Chinezen (1856–1893)
3. Nj. Han Tjoei Hing Sia

Government offices
| Preceded by Luitenant Tan Kang Ie | Luitenant der Chinezen of Bekasi; 1886–1893 | Succeeded by |
