= Sanusi Pane =

Indonesian author, journalist and historian

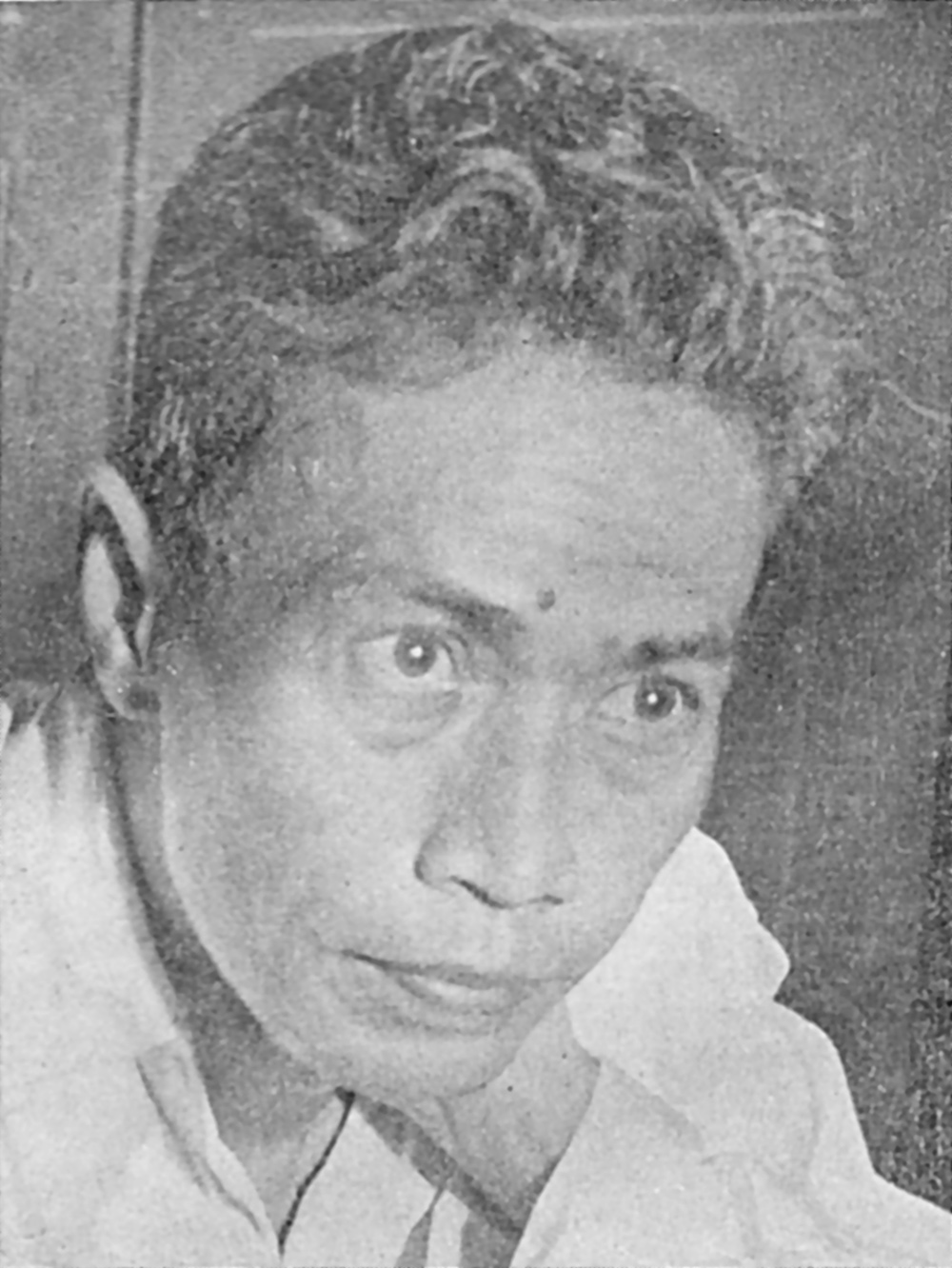
- Born: 14 November 1905; Moeara Sipongi, North Sumatra, Dutch East Indies
- Died: 2 January 1968 (aged 62); Djakarta, Indonesia
- Occupations: Author, journalist, historian
- Writing career
- Language: Indonesian; Dutch
- Genres: Poems and plays

Sanusi Pane (14 November 1905 – 2 January 1968) was an Indonesian writer, journalist, and historian. He was highly active in literary media, sitting on the editorial boards of several publications. He has also been described as the most important dramatist from before the Indonesian National Revolution.

== Biography ==
Pane was born in Muara Sipongi, Tapanuli, Dutch East Indies, on 14 November 1905 to a Muslim family. He began his education in two primary schools in Sibolga, before continuing to middle school, first in Padang, then in Batavia (modern day Jakarta). While in Jakarta, Pane published his first poem, "Tanah Air" ("Homeland"), in the magazine Jong Soematra. After graduating in 1922, he attended the Gunung Sari Teachers' College until 1925; upon graduation, he taught at the college for several years and took a year to study law.

In 1929, Pane moved to India, where he spent a year studying the culture of India. After his return to the Indies in 1930, Pane became a member of the editorial staff of Timboel magazine as well as a teacher. In 1933, his younger brother Armijn called on him to work on the new literary magazine, Poedjangga Baroe; Pane accepted. In 1934 he was fired as a teacher due to his membership in the Indonesian National Party.

Pane continued to be active in literary circles, joining the editorial board of Panorama in the early 1930s, together with Liem Koen Hian, Amir Sjarifuddin and Mohammad Yamin. Panorama was a newspaper belonging to Siang Po Press, a publishing house owned by the Dutch-educated jurist and politician Phoa Liong Gie. In mid-1936, together with his colleagues Liem, Sjarifuddin and Yamin, Pane started another newspaper, Kebangoenan (1936–1941), which was also published by Phoa's Siang Po Printing Press.

Together with Armijn, Adam Malik, and Soemanang Soerjowinoto, on 13 December 1937 Pane founded the news agency Antara; after independence, Antara became Indonesia's official news agency. From 1941 to 1942, Pane edited the magazine Indonesia, published by the state-owned publisher Balai Pustaka. While working with Balai Pustaka, Pane would refuse employee benefits such as free rice and a shuttle service, instead choosing to walk to work and buy his own rice.

After the Japanese invaded the Indies, Pane became the head of the Central Cultural Office.

Pane died in Jakarta on 2 January 1968. Before he died, he requested that his body be treated in a Hindu manner; however, his family did not grant the request as they felt it would be against Islamic teachings.

== Style ==
Pane's poems used everyday language, including foreign loanwords. He limited his use of the local languages of Indonesia, including his native language Batak. Structurally, his poems resembled the old Malay form pantun, although he also wrote several sonnets. Many of his poems dealt with philosophical issues. Indonesian writer and literary critic Muhammad Balfas calls Pane the "first [Indonesian poet] who used his poetry to reveal his inner self".

== Views ==
Pane viewed Western cultures as being too materialistic, focusing on the physical aspects of life; Eastern cultures, on the other hand, he viewed as being more spiritualistic. He saw this as influencing the way in which humans interacted with nature, with Westerners seeking to conquer it and Easterners preferring to adapt to it. In one polemic in response to fellow Poedjangga Baroe editor Sutan Takdir Alisjahbana, who was decidedly pro-Western, Pane compared the West to Faust, who sold his soul to the devil for worldly pleasure and knowledge, and the East to Arjuna, who searched for a spiritual truth. Pane did, however, admit that Western technology could bring a positive change.

== Personal life ==
Pane was elder brother to writer Armijn Pane and Lafran Pane, the latter of whom founded the Indonesian Muslim Students' Association. With his wife, Pane had six children. Pane's religious views have been described as being a "composite of Hinduism, Buddhism, Sufism, and Javanese philosophy".

Pane was reportedly very modest, telling J. U. Nasution – who at the time was in the midst of writing a biography on Pane – that he was nothing and should not be interviewed. On another occasion, he refused a Satya Lencana Kebudayaan award from President Sukarno, stating that Indonesia had given him everything but he had done nothing for it.

== Legacy ==
Balfas called Pane the most important Indonesian dramatist from before the national revolution.

== Works ==
=== Plays ===
- "Airlangga" (1928)
- "Eenzame Garoedavlucht" ("The Lonely Flight of the Garuda"; 1929)
- "Kertadjaja" (1932)
- "Sandhyakala ning Madjapahit" (1933)
- "Manoesia Baroe" ("New Person"; 1940)

=== Poetry anthologies ===
- Puspa Mega (Flowers and Clouds; 1927)
- Madah Kelana (Hymn of the Wanderer; 1931)
