= Loa Sek Hie =

Colonial Indonesian politician

- 賴錫禧
- Born: 1898; Batavia, Dutch East Indies
- Died: 1965 (aged 66–67); The Hague, the Netherlands
- Occupation(s): politician, parliamentarian, community leader, landowner
- Spouse: Tan Pouw Nio
- Parents: Loa Tiang Hoei, Kapitein der Chinezen (father); Louise Goldman (mother)
- Family: Loa Po Seng (grandfather); Tan Liok Tiauw (father-in-law); Tan Tiang Po, Luitenant der Chinezen (grandfather-in-law)
- Awards: Officer of the Order of Orange-Nassau

Loa Sek Hie Sia (1898, Batavia – 1965, The Hague) was a colonial Indonesian politician, parliamentarian and the founding Voorzitter or chairman of the controversial, ethnic-Chinese self-defense force Pao An Tui (1946–1949). He was a Peranakan of Chinese-Indonesian, Austrian and Javanese descent. In his political career, he campaigned against racial discrimination and demanded better healthcare and education for ethnic Chinese in the Dutch East Indies.

== History ==
=== Family and education ===
Loa was born in Pasar Baru, Batavia in 1898 into one of the city's most prominent families, part of the 'Cabang Atas' or Peranakan Chinese gentry of Java. His grandfather was the tycoon Loa Po Seng, of Jalan Poseng in Pasar Baru, while his father, Loa Tiang Hoei, served as Kapitein der Chinezen of Pasar Baru. This was a civil government appointment with legal and political authority over the local Chinese community.

Loa's mother, Louise Goldman, came from an Indo-European family of Austrian-Jewish descent, but long settled in the Indies. His adoptive and stepmother, Tio Bit Nio, was a first cousin of Tio Tek Ho, 4th Majoor der Chinezen of Batavia. As a descendant of Chinese officers, Loa bore the hereditary title of Sia.

He was educated at the Europeesche Lagere School (ESL) and the Hogere Burgerschool (HBS) in Batavia, then studied commerce at Prins Hendrik School, graduating in May 1917.

In November 1917, Loa married Tan Pouw Nio, daughter of Tan Liok Tiauw Sia and granddaughter of Tan Tiang Po, Luitenant der Chinezen, the Landheeren or landlords of Batoe-Tjepper. The young couple settled down in the then new, fashionable suburb of Menteng in the outskirts of Batavia.

=== Colonial career ===
Loa was appointed to the Gemeenteraad (the municipal council) of Batavia in 1919, and to the Volksraad (the parliament of colonial Indonesia) in 1927. From 1928 until 1951, he served on the Executive Board of Chung Hwa Hui (CHH), a center-right political party that advocated change through cooperation with the Dutch colonial state. Loa was also part of the Masonic Lodge of Batavia.

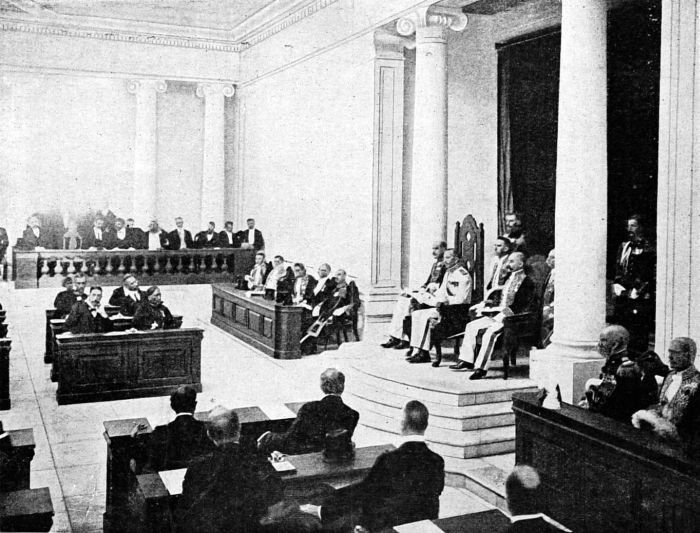
A session of the Volksraad.

As parliamentarian, Loa worked closely with Hok Hoei Kan, chairman of CHH, to abolish discriminatory policies against Chinese subjects of the colony. He campaigned further for the creation of educational and health institutions for the Chinese community. To remedy perceived government indifference, Loa played a leading role in the establishment of Jang Seng Ie (now Husada Hospital). He served on the governing council of the hospital from 1924 until 1951.

Around 1929, he provided a character reference to the government for Liem Bwan Tjie, a well-known architect whose return from overseas had been obstructed due to suspected communist sympathies. Liem stayed at the Loa family residence, and helped remodel it – a project that became the architect's first commission back in the Indies.

In 1940, Loa was appointed by Queen Wilhelmina of the Netherlands as an Officer of the Order of Orange-Nassau in recognition of his civic service. When the Second World War broke out, Loa was apprehended by the occupying Japanese forces due to his perceived closeness with the Dutch colonial state. He was interned for much of the war, and was released in 1945.

=== Revolution ===
In the feverish atmosphere that followed the end of the War and the start of the Indonesian Revolution, he deemed it important for the Chinese community to be able to defend its interests militarily. So, Loa became one of the founders of Pao An Tui, which many revolutionaries later accused to be a fighting, pro-Dutch militia. He served as Voorzitter, or chairman, of the organization's Central Committee. Pao An Tui received both arms and funding from the Allies, but also obtained the support of Indonesia's first Prime Minister, Sutan Sjahrir. During the tenure of the Netherlands Indies Civil Administration, Loa acted as an advisor in the emergency cabinet of Hubertus van Mook, the country's acting Governor-General.

After it became clear that Indonesia was to attain independence, Loa supported the federal movement. Federalism, however, did not gain widespread popular support due to perceived Dutch patronage. With the defeat of federalism by the centralist faction, led by Sukarno and Mohammad Hatta, Loa withdrew from the political sphere.

=== Emigration and death ===
Sukarno consulted Loa Sek Hie on issues ranging from Dutch business interests to Freemasonry in Indonesia, but generally ignored the latter's advice. Loa left Indonesia for the Netherlands in 1964. He was naturalized as a Dutch citizen in 1965, and died in The Hague later that same year.

== See also ==
- Volksraad, the first legislature in colonial Indonesia
- Khouw Kim An, Majoor der Chinezen, parliamentary colleague
- Hok Hoei Kan, fellow parliamentarian and board member of Chung Hwa Hui
- Phoa Liong Gie, fellow parliamentarian, member of Chung Hua Hui, and political rival
- Peranakan Chinese

== Works cited ==
- den Dikken, Judy (2002). Liem Bwan Tjie (1891-1966) Westerse vernieuwing en oosterse traditie. STICHTING BONAS Rotterdam. ISBN 90-76643-14-8.
- Haris, Syamsuddin (2007). Partai dan Parlemen Lokal Era Transisi Demokrasi di Indonesia: Studi Kinerja Partai-Partai di DPRD Kabupaten/Kota. TransMedia. ISBN 978-9797990527.
- Lohanda, Mona (2002). Growing Pains: The Chinese and The Dutch in Colonial Java, 1890-1942. Yayasan Cipta Loka Caraka.
- Setiono, Benny G. (2003). Tionghoa dalam pusaran politik. Elkasa. ISBN 9799688744.
- Setyautama, Sam & Mihardja, Suma (2008). Tokoh-tokoh etnis Tionghoa di Indonesia. Kepustakaan Populer Gramedia. ISBN 978-9799101259.
- Stevens, Th (1994). Vrijmetselarij en samenleving in Nederlands-Indië en Indonesië 1764-1962. Uitgeverij Verloren. ISBN 9065503781.
- Suryadinate, Leo (1995). Prominent Indonesian Chinese: Biographical Sketches. Institute of Southeast Asian Studies. ISBN 9813055030.
- Suryadinata, Leo (2005). Peranakan Chinese Politics in Java, 1917-1942. Marshall Cavendish Academic. ISBN 9812103600.
