= Njonja Tjoa Hin Hoei =

Chinese Indonesian journalist and writer (1907–1990)

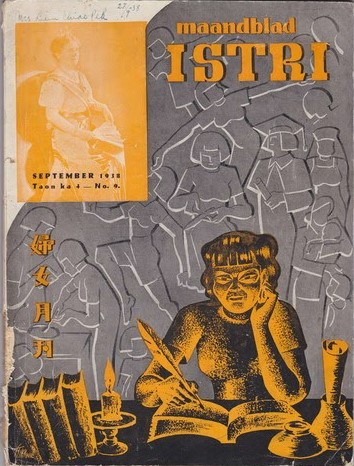
Cover of a September 1938 issue of Maandblad Istri

Njonja Tjoa Hin Hoei (c. 1907–1990), who was born Kwee Yat Nio (Chinese: 郭悅娘) and was also known by the Buddhist name Visakha Gunadharma, was a Chinese Indonesian journalist, writer, Buddhist figure, and political activist during the late colonial and early independence periods. She was especially known for being publisher and editor of a women's magazine Maandblad Istri which ran from the 1930s to the early 1950s.

== Biography ==
She was born Kwee Yat Nio in 1906 or 1907 in Buitenzorg, Dutch East Indies (today Bogor, Indonesia). She was the oldest child of Kwee Tek Hoay, was a multilingual Peranakan Chinese journalist, writer and translator. She was educated in Buitenzorg at a Tiong Hoa Hwee Koan school and then at an English-language Methodist school, which she graduated from in 1924; she then became a teacher there. Even while she was still a student her father encouraged her to read and write and to translate English-language news from foreign sources for Malay-language newspapers such as Sin Po. In the early 1920s she founded a women's organization named Chie Mey Hui (sisters' association); its goal was to unite unmarried Peranakan girls and promote their education and development. In 1925 she married Tjoa Hin Hoei, a man from Lampung, Sumatra who had also studied at the THHK school in Buitenzorg. She left her teaching job at the Methodist school and they relocated to Batavia where she started teaching in an English school.

She began to write in the 1930s, publishing in Moestika Romans. She published not under her own name but as Nyonya (Mrs.) Tjoa Hin Hoei. During the 1930s she also published articles in the women's sections of various Chinese Indonesian newspapers such as Keng Po, Sin Tit Po, and Mata Hari, and in her father's magazine Moestika Dharma.

During the prewar years she was very active in Chinese political organizations in Java. From 1934 to 1938 she was secretary of the Buddhist Association in Batavia. From 1932 to 1940 she was chair of the Chinese Women's Association in Batavia.

In September 1935, with the encouragement of family and her readers, she launched her own magazine Maandblad Istri (wife's monthly), often known simply as Istri (wife). It was printed in Malay (Indonesian) and was aimed mainly at Peranakan Chinese women, especially those who were not educated enough to be able to read Dutch. Eventually it seems to have become popular among Indonesian women as well; in turn, Tjoa advocated for good relations between them and Chinese women, and an awareness of their situation. Istri published fiction, film reviews, recipes, fashion, and educational content about children's health and women's status; the majority of the content was written by Tjoa herself. Tjoa's editorial line was not always a radical one; she believed that women should be modest and follow traditional Chinese values, and that education was useful to create ideal wives and daughters. Among its editorial board was Thung Sin Nio, a Dutch-educated medical doctor. Another reason for its longevity is that the magazine had the support of the mainstream Peranakan community in Batavia, including the THHK and Chung Hwa Hui. This support also allowed Tjoa and other writers to publish under their own names; at the time it was still common for women writers in the Indies to publish under pseudonyms.

In 1940 Tjoa had legal difficulties as editor of the magazine when it was deemed to have printed defamatory material under the Indies' strict censorship laws. The court eventually found the case inadmissible. The magazine ceased publication during the Japanese occupation and Indonesian National Revolution and restarted after independence. At some point during the early- or mid-1950s it closed due to money problems and paper shortages. The death of her husband Tjoa Hin Hoei in 1956 may also have been a factor.

Following independence she was also active in a number of Chinese Indonesian and Buddhist organizations. From 1952 onwards she became director of Tri Budaja, the publication of the Sam Kauw Indonesia federation (Chinese: 三教文化). She was also chair of the women's section of the Consultative Council for Indonesian Citizenship from 1956 to 1964.

Following the Transition to the New Order, many Chinese Indonesian organizations were closed by the dictatorship; after that she mostly focused on the publication of religious materials and remained active in local Buddhist organizations in Jakarta. After 1973 she became a deputy leader in the newly founded Indonesian Buddhist Women's Fellowship (Wanita Buddhis Indonesia). During this period she adopted the Indonesian or Buddhist name Visakha Gunadharma.

She died on 26 September 1990 (some sources incorrectly give the year as 1993). She left an autobiography (Visakha Gunadharma: Otobiografi Kwee Yat Nio) which is as of yet unpublished.

== Family ==
Kwee and Tjoa had five children; daughters Lenny Tjoa Keng Yin, Effie Tjoa Keng Loan, Yenny Tjoa Keng Lan and sons Tjoa Keng Pen and Tjoa Keng Hok. Lenny and Effie were well known as classical musicians during the post-independence era.
