= Leo Suryadinata =

Indonesian-born Singaporean sinologist (b. 1941)

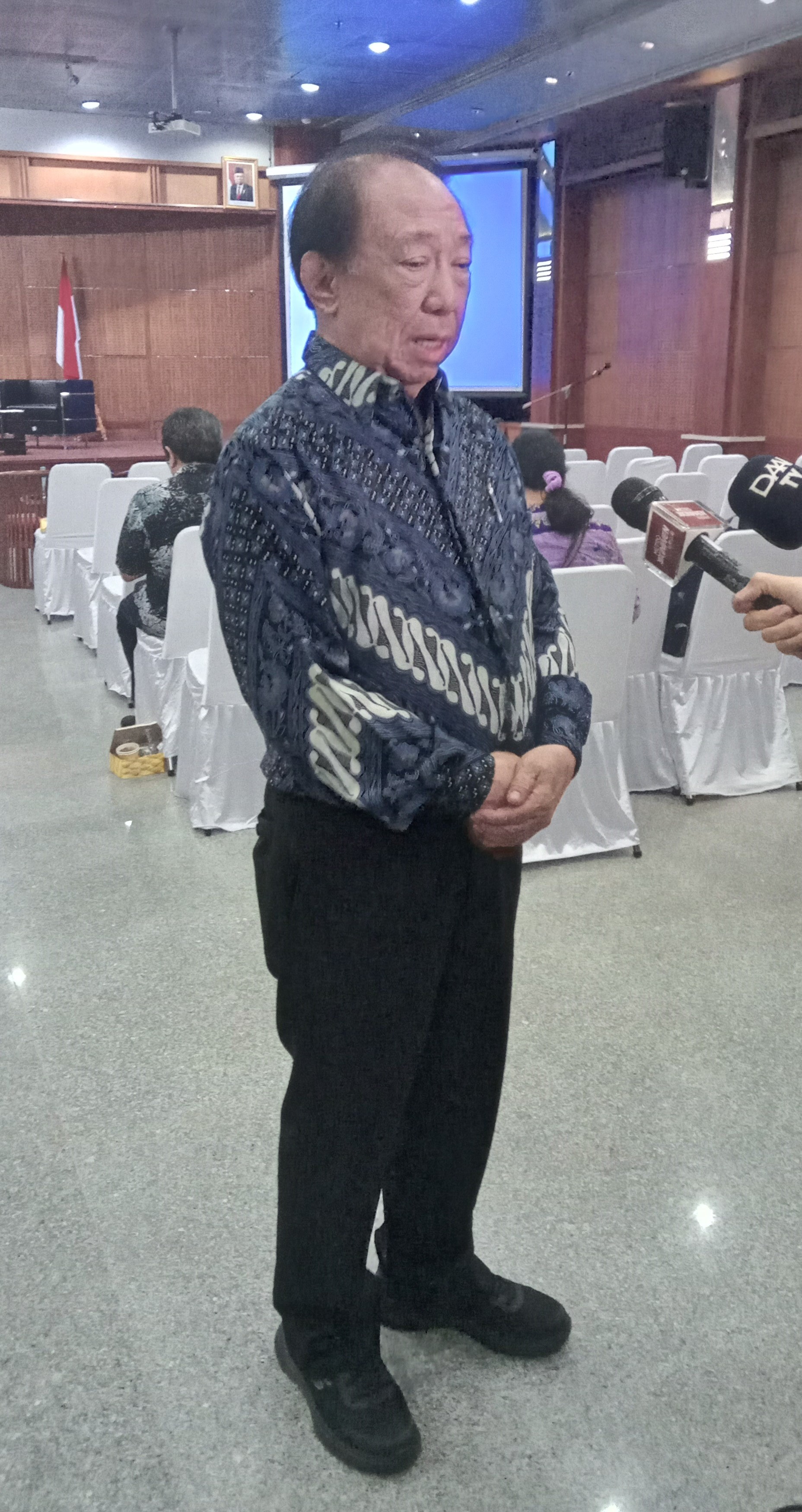
- Suryadinata in 2023.
- Born: 21 February 1941 (age 85); Batavia, Dutch East Indies (today Jakarta, Indonesia)
- Citizenship: Singapore
- Education: Nanyang University (B.A.); University of Indonesia (B.A.); Monash University (M.A.); Ohio University (M.A.); American University (PhD)
- Known for: Academic inquiries on the Overseas Chinese bamboo network and Chinese Indonesians
- Scientific career
- Fields: Sinology

Leo Suryadinata (born Liauw Kian-Djoe [or Liao Jianyu; 廖建裕]; 21 February 1941) is an Indonesian-born Singaporean sinologist.

== Early life ==
Suryadinata was born Liauw Kian-Djoe (also written Liao Jianyu) in Batavia, Netherlands Indies (today Jakarta, Indonesia) to a Chinese Indonesian business family. His father was the owner of a building material factory. He had seven siblings.

During high school, Suryadinata read and wrote numerous papers on Indonesian and Chinese history and literature.

== Education ==
Suryadinata later attended Nanyang University in Singapore, where he graduated in 1962 with a bachelor of arts degree in Chinese and Southeast Asian literature.

From 1962 to 1965, Suryadinata studied Chinese literature at the University of Indonesia in Jakarta, receiving another bachelor's degree from that institution. Even though his core area of study focused on Chinese literature, he began to display interest in the Chinese Indonesian community. His undergraduate thesis discussed the late 19th century Peranakan Chinese press and early 20th century resistance movements against the Dutch colonial government.

In 1970, Suryadinata received a master of arts degree in history from Monash University in Australia. Two years later, he graduated from the Ohio University in the United States with a master's degree in political science. He later received his doctorate from the American University in Washington, D.C.

== Career ==
After earning his doctorate, Suryadinata returned to Singapore and took an academic research position at the Institute of Southeast Asian Studies (ISEAS) from 1976 to 1982. In 1982, he took a job as senior lecturer at Department of Political Science of the National University of Singapore; he later became an assistant professor in 1994 and a full professor in 2000.

From 1990, Suryadinata has served as the editor of the academic journal Asian Culture. He also served as editor (later co-editor) the Asian Journal of Political Science from 1993 to 2002.

In 2002, Suryadinata returned to ISEAS as a senior research fellow; he left in 2005. That year, he took a position as the director of the Chinese Heritage Center at Nanyang Technological University.

== Publications ==
As of 2008, Suryadinata has published 50 books and monographs, 30 chapters in peer reviewed books, 15 articles in international journals, 11 articles in Indonesian journals, six working papers and more than 100 conference papers. They have been published in English, Indonesian, and Chinese. Aimee Dawis of The Jakarta Post writes that "anyone studying the ethnic Chinese in Indonesia is bound to encounter Leo Suryadinata's works."

== Awards ==
In 2008, Suryadinata (together with German researcher Mary F. Somers) received the Nabil Award for contributions to Indonesian ethnic integration.

== Personal life ==
Suryadinata has one daughter.
