= Hok Hoei Kan =

Indonesian statesman

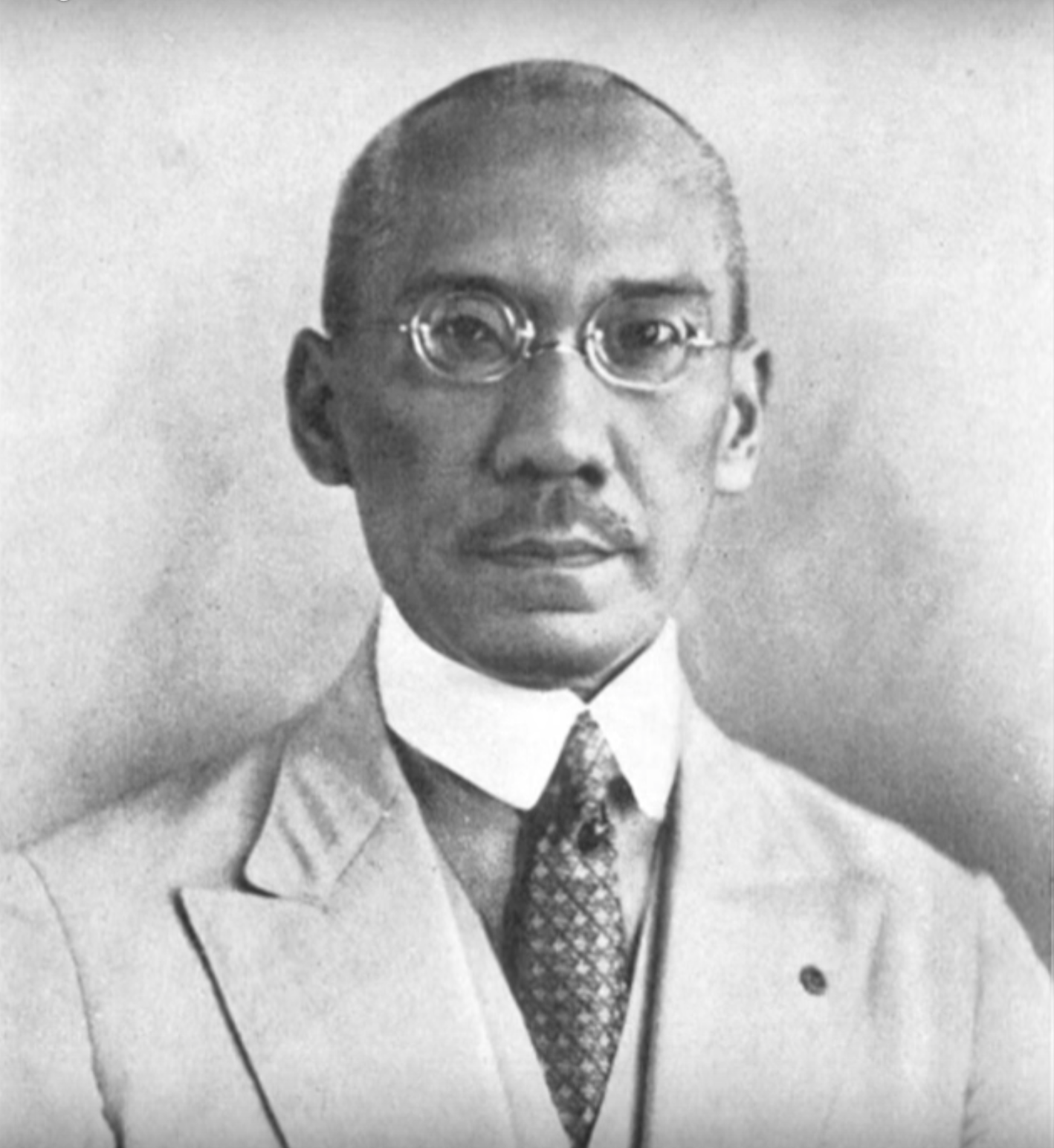
- H. H. Kan
- Born: 6 January 1881; Batavia, Dutch East Indies
- Died: 1 March 1951 (aged 70); Jakarta, Indonesia
- Occupations: politician, parliamentarian, community leader, landowner
- Spouse: Lie Tien Nio
- Children: 8 children
- Parents: Han Oen Lee, Luitenant der Chinezen (father); Kan Oe Nio (mother)
- Family: Kan Keng Tjong (grandfather); Lie Tjoe Hong, Majoor der Chinezen (father-in-law); Aw Tjoei Lan (sister-in-law)
- Awards: Knight of the Order of the Netherlands Lion; Officer of the Order of Orange-Nassau

Kan Hok Hoei Sia (Chinese: 簡福輝舍; pinyin: Jiǎn Fúhuī Shè; Pe̍h-ōe-jī: Kán Hok-hui Sià; 6 January 1881 - 1 March 1951), generally known as Hok Hoei Kan or in short H. H. Kan, was a prominent public figure, statesman and patrician landowner of Peranakan Chinese descent in the Dutch East Indies (today known as Indonesia).

He was the founding president of Chung Hwa Hui (CHH), a Chinese-Indonesian political party, and sat as its leading parliamentary representative in the Volksraad. He advocated cooperation with the Dutch colonial authorities in order to attain racial and legal equality for the colony's Chinese community, but was criticised for his pro-Dutch sentiments and perceived elite indifference to poorer Indonesians.

== Family and early life ==
Kan was born Han Khing Tjiang Sia in Batavia, capital of the Dutch East Indies, into the heart of the 'Cabang Atas' or the Chinese gentry of Java. His father, Han Oen Lee (1856—1893), served as Luitenant der Chinezen of Bekasi, an important administrative post in the colonial bureaucracy, and hailed from one of the oldest and most storied of Java's Chinese lineages, the Han family of Lasem. Through his father, Kan could trace his ancestry in Java back to Han Khee Bing, Luitenant der Chinezen (1749 – 1768), the eldest son of the mid-18th century magnate Han Bwee Kong, Kapitein der Chinezen (1727 – 1778), and grandson of the founder of the family, Han Siong Kong (1673-1743). As a descendant of a long line of Chinese officers, Kan held the hereditary title of Sia from birth.

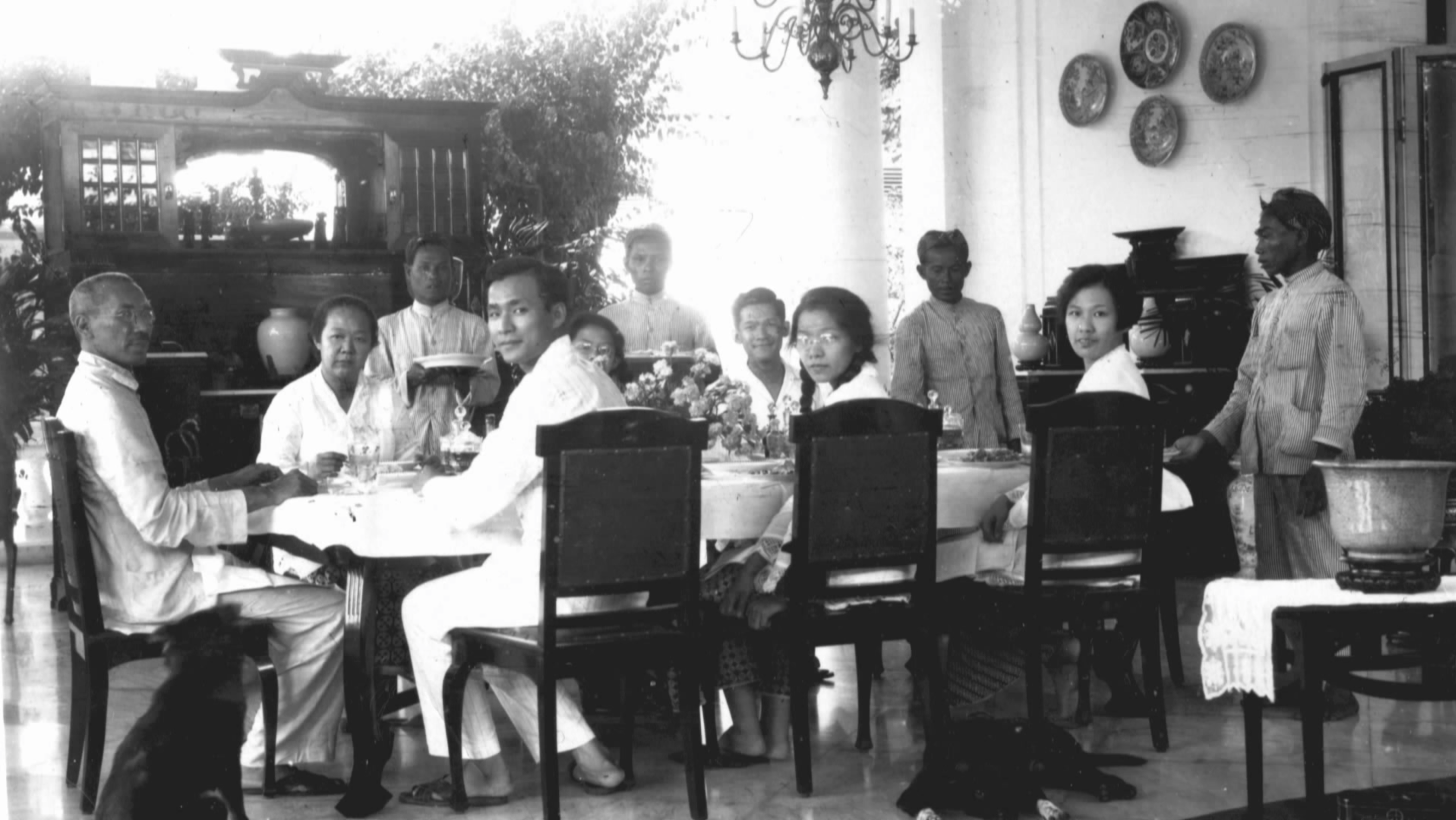
H. H. Kan (1881—1951) and his family

His mother, Kan Oe Nio (1850—1910), was one of Batavia's richest heiresses, and daughter of the well-known tycoon and landlord, Kan Keng Tjong (1797—1871), who was elevated by the Chinese Imperial Government to the rank of mandarin of the third grade. Han Khing Tjiang Sia was adopted by his childless uncle, Kan Tjeng Soen (1855—1896), and renamed Kan Hok Hoei Sia, and thus became the principal heir of the name and fortune of his maternal grandfather. His adoptive mother and aunt, Khouw Tjoei Nio (1854—1944), was a daughter of Khouw Tjeng Tjoan, Luitenant der Chinezen (1808—1880) and an elder sister of Khouw Kim An (1875—1945), the 5th Majoor der Chinezen of Batavia.

Kan had a thoroughly European upbringing, and was schooled at the Europeesche Lagere School (ELS) and the prestigious Koning Willem III School te Batavia (KW III). In addition to his native Malay and fluent Dutch, he was reputed to be conversant in seven other European languages.

In 1899, he married his first cousin, Lie Tien Nio (1885—1944), daughter of Lie Tjoe Hong (1846—1896), the 3rd Majoor der Chinezen of Batavia, and — like her husband — a grandchild of Kan Keng Tjong. His wife belonged to the well-connected and influential Lie family of Pasilian. Through his wife, Kan became a brother-in-law of the public administrator Lie Tjian Tjoen, Kapitein der Chinezen and of the latter's wife, the philanthropist and anti-human trafficking activist Aw Tjoei Lan (1889—1965). Kan and his wife had 8 children.

Kan applied and obtained legal equality with Europeans (gelijkgestelling) in 1905, after which he was universally known as Hok Hoei Kan or H. H. Kan.

== Political career ==
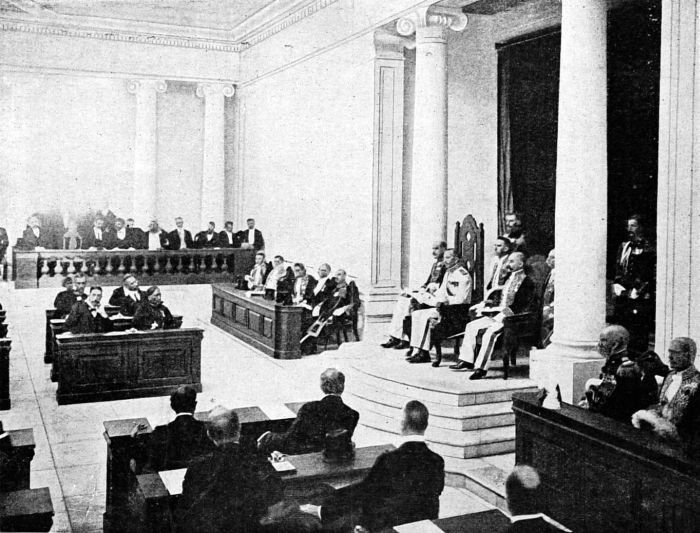
A session of the Volksraad.

His political career began in the Municipal Council of Batavia and a number of Chinese chambers of commerce (Siang Hwee). When the Volksraad, Indonesia's first legislature, was convened by the Governor-General for the first time, Kan accepted appointment to the newly founded legislative body in 1918. He did so despite widespread opposition to the colonial parliament from many Chinese and indigenous subjects of the Dutch East Indies, many of whom refused to cooperate with the colonial government and campaigned for outright independence. Kan remained a member of the Volksraad until its dissolution by the Japanese, who invaded the colony in 1942 during the Second World War.

In 1928, Kan presided — as founding President — over the formation of Chung Hwa Hui (CHH), a political association that attracted the support of mainly Dutch-educated ethnic Chinese. Together with the likes of his distant cousin, Han Tiauw Tjong, and Loa Sek Hie, who were both on the Executive Committee of CHH, Kan pleaded for legal equality of the Chinese with Europeans under Indies law. Kan also opposed some of the legal disabilities that had been imposed on the Chinese of the colony, such as limitations on ownership of agricultural land and excessive taxation. Nonetheless, CHH was dubbed the 'Packard club' by the colonial press for the expensive cars used by the party's leadership, and was criticised as too elitist and removed from the day-to-day concerns of other Chinese-Indonesians.

Kan's relationship with Indonesian nationalists was also ambiguous. In 1927, Kan voted against expanding the franchise for elections to the Volksraad as he feared domination of the legislature by indigenous Indonesians. His pro-Dutch attitude even drew the criticism of Phoa Liong Gie, a leader of CHH's more liberal and pro-nationalist younger faction. Following an open conflict over Kan's apparent dominance of CHH, Phoa resigned from the party and sat as an independent in the Volksraad when eventually appointed to it in 1939. Notwithstanding supposed pro-Dutch sympathies, Kan supported the ill-fated Soetardjo Petition in 1936, which requested Indonesian Independence within ten years as part of a Dutch commonwealth.

In 1932, representing Chinese-Indonesian private enterprises, Kan went on a tour of China, and became close to the Chinese Consul-General to the Dutch East Indies. In 1934, the colony's Chinese chambers of commerce federated, and offered the Consul-General the position of honorary president, and Kan that of inaugural president. This drew the ire of the then Governor-General due to the federated group's perceived closeness to the Republic of China, a foreign power, leading to Kan's resignation of his presidency of the chamber. In 1935, Kan went to the Netherlands to promote better relations between the Chinese-Indonesian community and the Dutch authorities.

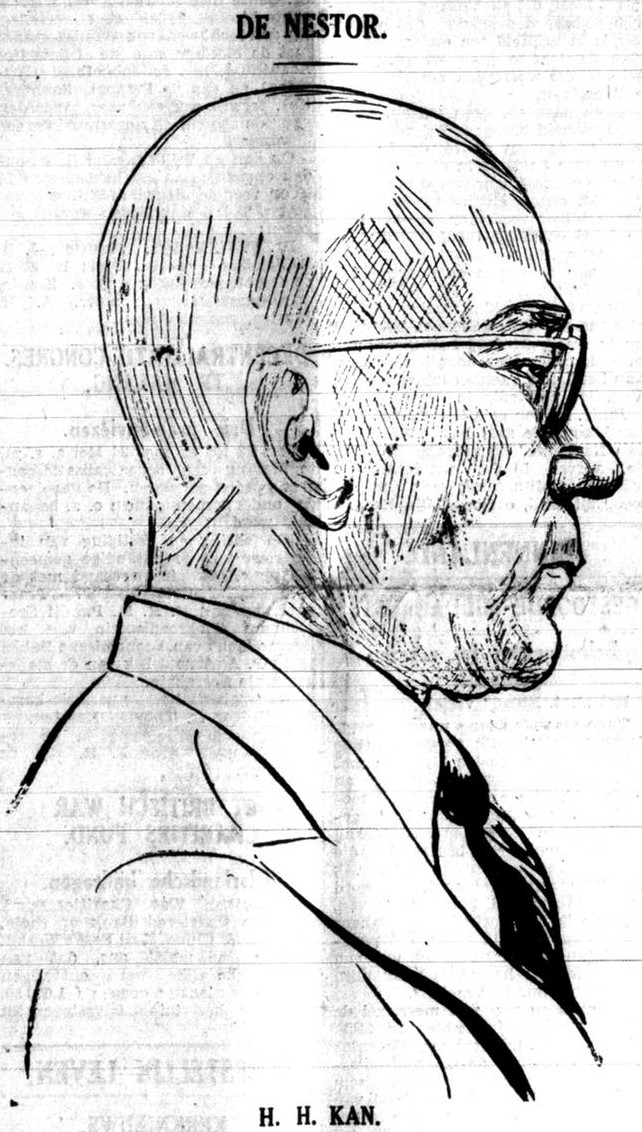
H. H. Kan portrait, 1941

Kan was made an Officer of the Order of Orange-Nassau in 1921, and a Knight of the Order of the Netherlands Lion in 1930 in recognition of his service to the Dutch Crown.

== Japanese occupation and death ==
When the Japanese invaded Java in 1942, they apprehended Kan along with other leaders of the colonial government due to their anti-Japanese activities. Kan was imprisoned in Tjimahi until the Japanese capitulated in 1945.

He did not resume political activities after the Second World War, and died at his residence on Jalan Teuku Umar in Menteng in 1951.

== Ancestry ==
Ancestors of Hok Hoei Kan

16. Han Soe Sik, Luitenant-Kapitein der Chinezen (1767–1827)
8. Han Tiauw Kie, Luitenant der Chinezen (1790–1871)
17. Nj. Luitenant-Kapitein Han Soe Sik (née Liem Tjien Bok) (1769–1842)
4. Han Tjoei Hing Sia (d. 1882)
9. Nj. Luitenant Han Tiauw Kie (née Yap) (1798–1841)
2. Han Oen Lee, Luitenant der Chinezen (1856–1893)
5. Nj. Han Tjoei Hing Sia
1. H. H. Kan
12. Kan Yeo Soen
6. Kan Keng Tjong, Mandarin of the third rank (1797–1871)
13. Nj. Kan Yeo Soen
3. Kan Oe Nio (1850–1910)
7. Jo Heng Nio (1827–1900)

== See also ==
- The Han family of Lasem, his paternal family
- Volksraad, the first legislature in colonial Indonesia
- Han Tiauw Tjong, his cousin, fellow parliamentarian and co-founder of CHH
- Loa Sek Hie, fellow parliamentarian and co-founder of CHH
- Phoa Liong Gie, fellow parliamentarian, member of Chung Hua Hui, and political rival
- Lie Tjoe Hong, 3rd Majoor der Chinezen, father-in-law
- Han Oen Lee, Luitenant der Chinezen, father
- Kan Keng Tjong, grandfather
- Aw Tjoei Lan, sister-in-law
