= Soetardjo Petition =

1936 Dutch East Indies petition

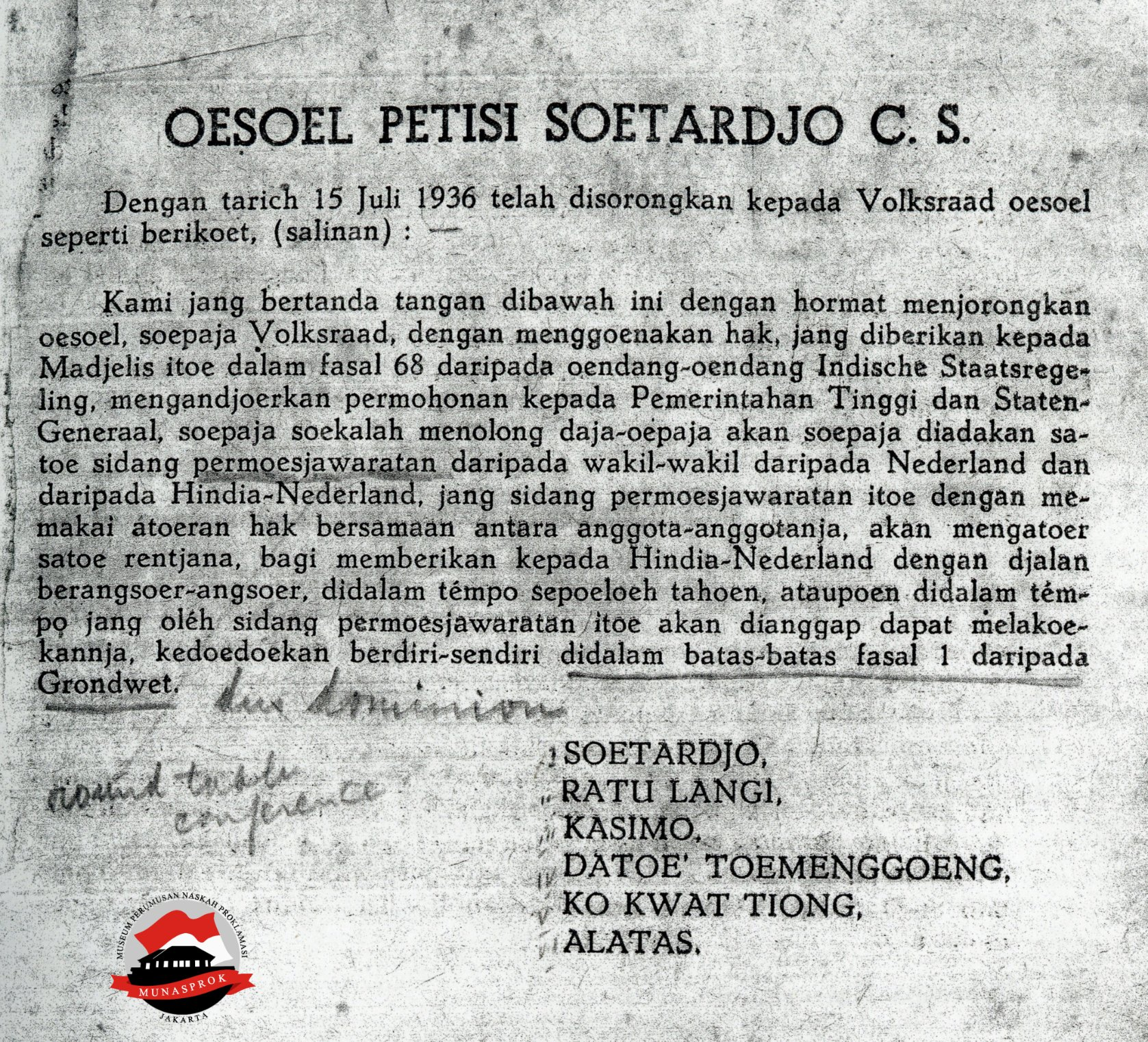
- Presented: 15 July 1936
- Author: Soetardjo Kartohadikusumo
- Purpose: Calling for a conference to give autonomy and self-governance for the Dutch East Indies within the limits of the Dutch constitution

The Soetardjo Petition (Dutch: Petitie-Soetardjo; Indonesian: Petisi Soetardjo) was a petition presented to the Volksraad of the Dutch East Indies by Soetardjo Kartohadikusumo in 1936. It called for a conference to give autonomy and self-governance for the Dutch East Indies within the limits of the Dutch constitution. However, it was rejected by the Dutch government.

== Background ==
In 1918, the Dutch colonial government established the Volksraad (People's Council), an advisory body, and by 1931 half of the members were Indonesian. Following repression of nationalists in the 1930s, it became the main forum for "cooperating" Indonesians, whose who were prepared to participate in Dutch established bodies, to express their opinions. In 1935, the main nationalist parties were grouped together under the National Faction led by Mohammad Husni Thamrin.

Soetardjo Kartohadikusumo, president of the Native Civil Servants Association, was not a member of the National Faction. He became more nationalist in outlook partly as a result of resentment over the low standing of Indonesian civil servants relative to Dutch administrators, who he saw as being responsible for the natural group to bring about the advancement of the country. He also felt it was his duty to become an intermediary between the government and the people. As his dissatisfaction with the Dutch grew, he concluded that more autonomy for the East Indies was the best way forward.

== The petition ==
The document asked for a round table conference to be organized with representatives from the Indies and the Netherlands to discuss the desire of Indonesians, within a period of ten years, to be autonomous under Article 1 of the Dutch Constitution as part of a Dutch commonwealth under the Dutch Crown.

The petition had six signatories:

- Soetardjo (Javanese, president of Native Civil Servants Association (PPBB))
- Sam Ratulangi (Minahasan)
- Sayyid Ismail Alatas (representative of the ethnic Arab community)
- I. J. Kasimo (Javanese, president of a Catholic association)
- Ko Kwat Tiong Sia (representative of the ethnic Chinese community)
- Datoek Toemoenggoeng (Minangkabau, PPBB member)

== Debate and vote in the Volksraad ==
The vote in the Volksraad took place on 29 September 1936, following a speech by Soetardjo in which he asked for support from the various Dutch factions, stating that there was no desire to sever the political links with the Netherlands. Crucially, the petition was supported by the Indo Europeesch Verbond (Indo European Alliance), with eight seats was the largest European party. The five members of the Politiek-Economischen Bond (Political Economic League) also agreed to support it once the ten-year timetable had been removed. Some Dutch members were opposed to the petition because they saw it as a threat to their position, or believed the Indonesians were not yet ready to assume governing responsibilities. Meanwhile, six Indonesian members, Mohammad Noor, Notosoetarso, Razoux Schultz, Soeroso, Wiryopranoto and Wiwoho also voted against it. Their reasons were varied. Some believed the petition was pointless without wider public support, while others were simply pro-Dutch, or had personal reasons. Eighteen "foreign Asians" and Indonesians, including Thamrin, supported the petition, and in the final vote, the it was approved by the Volksraad by 26 votes to 20.

== Responses to the petition ==
After the petition was passed, Indonesia newspapers began to express support for it, although all the European press in the Indies opposed it. In early 1937, the Dutch parliament decided to wait for official advice from the governor-general before responding. In October of that year, a Central Soetardjo Petition Committee headed by Soetardjo was formed to raise public support by collecting signatures. This resulted in many well-attended public meetings expressing support, but the collection of signatures was not very successful as many people were afraid to sign. A similar committee was formed in the Netherlands, also in October.

A major setback for supporters of the petition was the lack of support from Indonesian political parties. As expected, the Indonesian Islamic Union Party (PSII) opposed it because of the party's policy of non-cooperation with the colonial authorities. However, of the parties two parties that had seats in the Volksraad, Parindra opposed the petition, while Gerindo supported it, but banned its members from participating in the petition committee. These parties believed the petition to be a pointless gesture, or even a betrayal of those calling for nothing less than full independence.

The Council of the Indies advisory body urged the governor-general to reject the petition, claiming that it was at odds with the Dutch constitution, and that the East indies was not yet ready for the new role it would have were the petition accepted. In September 1938, Governor-General Alidius Tjarda van Starkenborgh Stachouwer sent his report to the Netherlands. recommending the petition be rejected as calling the conference it demanded would be seen a sign of weakness and would raise false hopes. He also stated that some native organizations also disagreed with the petition, and said that any reforms should be confined to the regional level.

On November 16, 1938, the petition was rejected by Netherlands by royal decree for the following reasons:

- It was in contradiction to Article 1 of the Dutch Constitution
- Moves were already underway to increase local involvement in internal policy, and these must be given time to take effect and develop
- Acknowledgement of growing dissent over Dutch rule "could be seen as a sign of weakness"
