= Liem Koen Hian =

Indonesian journalist and politician (1897-1952)

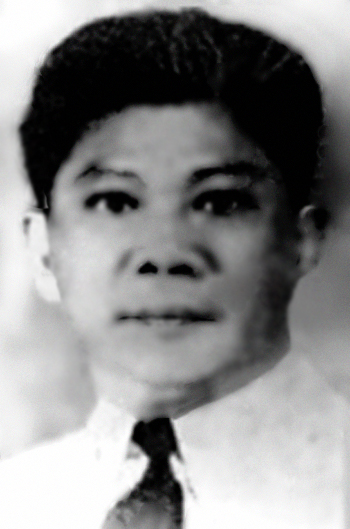

Liem Koen Hian (林群賢) (3 November 1897 – 4 November 1952) was an Indonesian journalist and politician. He was born in Banjarmasin, the son of a local Peranakan-Hakka Chinese business owner, Liem Ke An. He attended the Hollands-Chineesche School to class 6, when he was reportedly expelled after coming into conflict with a Dutch teacher. He subsequently worked as a business clerk for Royal Dutch Shell in Balikpapan before returning to Banjarmasin to work for a local newspaper. The name of the newspaper is not known, but may have been Penimbangan, Pengharepan, or Borneo Post.

In 1915 he moved to Surabaya where he worked in the newspaper Tjhoen Tjhioe. In 1917 he published a monthly magazine, Soe Liem Poo, but that title survived only briefly. Liem then moved to Aceh to carry out trade. At the end of 1918, Liem move to Padang to become editor of Sinar Soematra. He held that post until 1921, when he was invited by The Kian Sing to become editor of Pewarta Soerabaia. In 1925, Liem resigned from that paper and on 1 April 1925 he founded Soeara Poeblik, which continued to publish in Surabaya until 1929. In this period he argued strongly for the right of Chinese residents of the Dutch East Indies to retain Chinese citizenship and not to be registered as Dutch colonial subjects.

At about the same time that he launched Soeara Poebliek, Liem Koen Hian (and Kwee Thiam Tjing) joined the Nanyang Societie, a Chinese gambling association.

In 1919 he wrote, '"I am a Chinese, I have a fatherland across the sea which is trying to enhance itself. In this attempt it urges help and assistance from its faithful sons, either those who are still in the country or overseas. Among its own sons overseas, it includes my people in the Indies, who, in turn, look to their fatherland to enhance their status. This is the duty of the peranakan Chinese that before we help other countries, we should help China first because we place all our hope on China. It is understandable that the improvement of our status overseas would come rather slowly but we will not lose our patience."

In the late 1920s, however, influenced by the ideas of Tjipto Mangoenkoesoemo, he began to argue for an Indies citizenship (Indische burgerschap) which would encompass Chinese Indonesians (hoakiauw) resident in what he called Lam Yang (Indonesia), as well as Native Indonesians and Eurasians. This argument was directed especially against the associated with the newspaper Sin Po, who argued that Chinese in Indonesia should align themselves with China. Criticised for his apparent change of view, he responded, ""Previously I called myself a Chinese nationalist... [now] I call myself an Indonesian nationalist. It does not mean that I have changed my political conviction [belief], I have merely changed its object. Because I live in Indonesia, I believe I can do more for Indonesia than for China. However, the content of my conviction has not changed, for the content of Chinese nationalism is identical to Indonesia nationalism."

Based on this vision, Liem founded the Partai Tionghoa Indonesia which supported and took part in the Indonesian nationalist movement. The founding members of the new party included Kwee Thiam Tjing, a Dutch-educated journalist, and Ong Liang Kok a young lawyer. The founding meeting was held on 25 September 1932. In line with the ideas of Tjipto Mangoenkoesoemo, the party argued for the equality of all races in a future independent Indonesia. The new political party contrasted with the pro-establishment Chung Hwa Hui, which advocated loyalty to the Dutch colonial state; and with the Sin Po group that called for allegiance to the pre-war Republic of China.

Liem continued to work as a journalist, working as editor of Sin Tit Po (December 1929—1932). He shifted temporarily to Kong Hoa Po (April 1937—November 1938), but returned to Sin Tit Po in early 1938.

In the early 1930s, Liem was active in literary and journalist circles, joining the editorial board of the newspaper Panorama, together with Amir Syarifuddin, Sanusi Pane and Mohammad Yamin. In mid-1936, together with his colleagues Amir, Pane and Yamin, Liem started another newspaper, Kebangoenan (1936–1941), which—as with Panorama—was published by Phoa Liong Gie's Siang Po Printing Press.

In 1933—1935, Liem lived in Batavia where he reportedly attended lectures at the law school Rechts Hogeschool. In 1936, he criticised the nationalist Dr Soetomo, who had identified Japan as a model for Indonesian modernization. According to Liem, Japan was a dangerous imperialist power. He continued his criticism of Japan in a 1938 book, Tiongkok dan Djepang.

Liem was briefly imprisoned during the Japanese occupation of Indonesia, but was released due to his connection with Mrs Honda, an acquaintance from the Japanese community in Surabaya. He then worked as assistant to the head of the head of the Chinese Section of the Japanese Consulate in Batavia.

In 1945, Liem was selected as a member of the Badan Penyelidik Usaha Persiapan Kemerdekaan Indonesia. In this position, he argued that Chinese Indonesians should automatically receive Indonesian citizenship. In 1947, he was a member of the delegation of the Indonesian Republic that negotiated the Renville Agreement.

In 1951 he was owner of a pharmacy in Tanah Abang, Jakarta. In that year, he was arrested and detained as part of the mass arrests ordered by the government of Soekiman Wirjosandjojo on suspicion of leftist sympathies. This incident was a great disappointment to him. Impressed with developments in China under the Chinese Communist Party, he renounced his Indonesian citizenship. He died in Medan on 4 November 1952.
