= Europeesche Lagere School =

School system in the Dutch East Indies

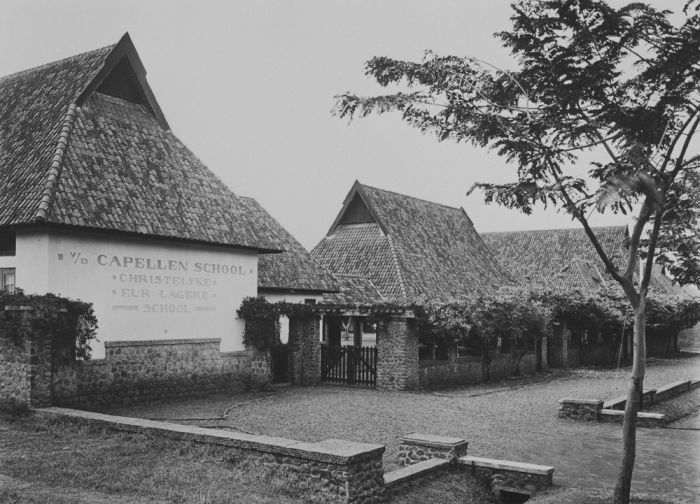
Capellen School, a Christian ELS in around 1930.

Europeesche Lagere School (ELS) was a European elementary school system in what was then the Dutch East Indies during colonial rule. The schools were intended primarily for Europeans. The implementation of basic education at that time was differentiated between basic education for European children and indigenous children, so there was a primary school for a European child (Lager Onderwijs en Lagere School voor Europeanen) and an elementary school for native and foreign Eastern children attending the ELS. Although special requirements were established, in 1902 the name Europeesche Lagere Scholen was used for European children's primary schools. It means to eliminate the impression that this school is solely for Europeans.

Having been established for the first time in Weltevreden (Jatinegara), the ELS was growing more and more in number. In 1820 there were only seven schools, and in 1845 there were 24 schools. Then, the number of schools grew up to 68 in 1868, until finally 198 (in 1917).

Seven years of study were required complete education in ELS. The subjects were the same as primary school subjects in the Netherlands, except for the subjects of Dutch History, which were replaced with Dutch and Dutch East Indies History. This History course emphasized the geography of the Dutch East Indies rather than the geography of the Netherlands. The education was carried out in two levels; basic education and advanced education.

The subjects taught at the basic education level include reading, writing, numeracy, Dutch language, Dutch and Indies history, earth sciences, natural knowledge, singing, drawing, and sports. Subjects given at advanced levels are French, English, general history, exact science, agricultural drawing, sports and handwork for female students. Problems relating to educational supervision were supervised by the commission for European schools while technical issues were handled by the Dutch Indies government education director, who in the course of his supervisory assignment divides the Dutch East Indies into five school districts.

== Examples ==
Below are lists of Europeesche Lagere School in the Dutch East Indies:

- The school at Theresiakerkweg, Batavia, currently Saint Theresia Catholic School at Jalan Haji Agus Salim.
- The school at Koto Gadang, West Sumatra, currently SD Koto Gadang.

== Cited works ==
- Plattegrond van Batavia (Map) (in Dutch). Cartography by E. Fuhri & Co. Soerabaja: Het Woningbureau Versluis N.V. 1934.
