= Han Bwee Kong =

Chinese-Indonesian magnate and government official

Kapitein Han Bwee Kong
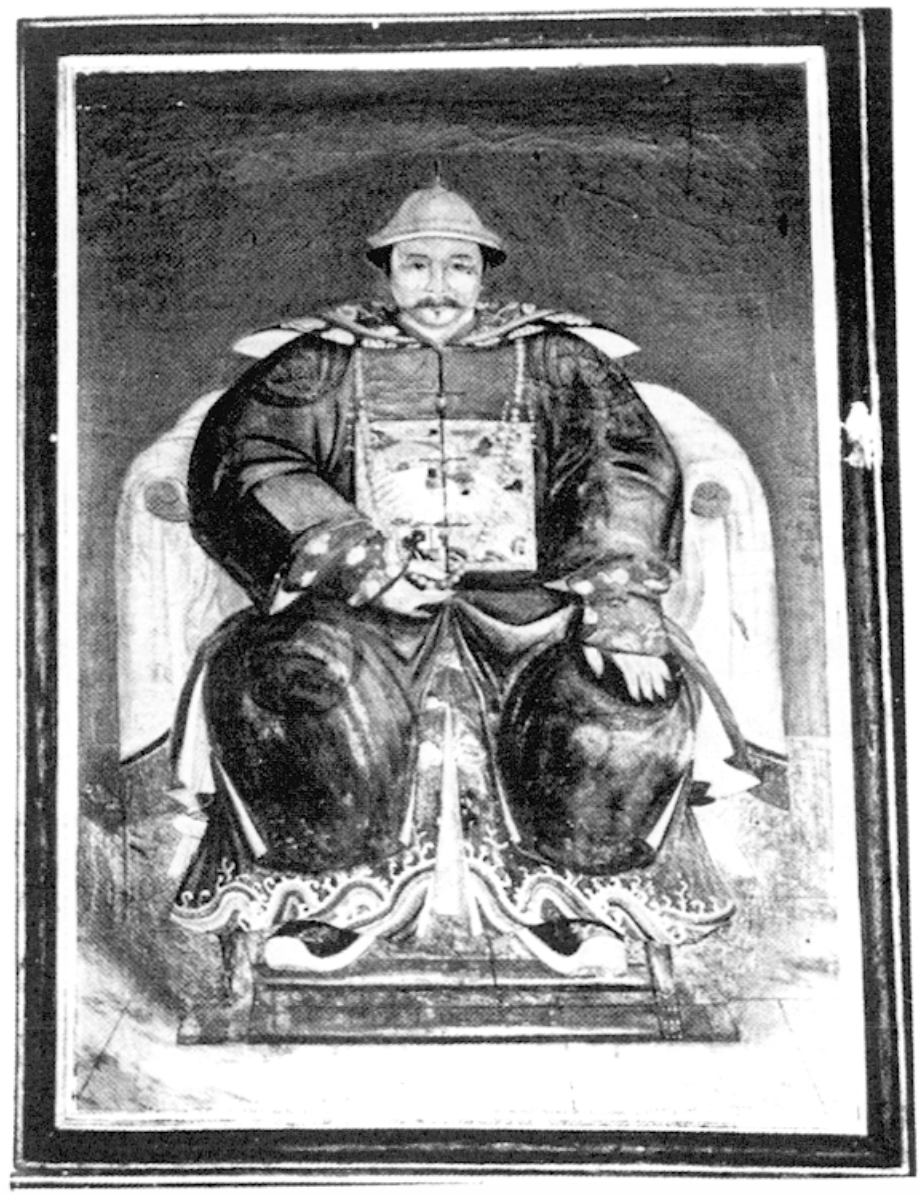
- Han Bwee Kong, Kapitein der Chinezen

Kapitein der Chinezen of Surabaya
- In office early 1700s – 1778
- Preceded by: unknown
- Succeeded by: Majoor Han Chan Piet
- Constituency: Surabaya

Personal details
- Born: 1727 Lasem, Central Java
- Died: 1778 Surabaya, East Java
- Spouse: Tan Ciguan
- Relations: Tan Ho Gian (father-in-law) Ngabehi Soero Pernollo (brother) Adipati Soero Adinegoro (nephew)
- Children: Han Chan Piet, Majoor der Chinezen; Han Kik Ko, Majoor der Chinezen
- Parent: Han Siong Kong (father)
- Occupation: Majoor der Chinezen, landlord

Han Bwee Kong, Kapitein der Chinezen (Chinese: 韓尾公; Pe̍h-ōe-jī: Hân Bóe-kong; 1727 – 1778), also known as Han Bwee Sing, Han Bwee Ko and in historic Dutch sources as Han Boeijko, was a Chinese-Indonesian magnate, government official and ally of the Dutch East India Company. He was the first member of the patrician Han family of Lasem to hold an official government position, that of Kapitein der Chinezen of Surabaya. He was also the pachter, or leaseholder, of the government districts of Besuki and Panarukan.

Han Bwee Kong was born in 1727 at the port city of Lasem in Central Java. He was the youngest of five sons born to Han Siong Kong (1673 – 1743), a Chinese migrant of ancient lineage, by an unnamed woman, probably a native or of at least part-native ancestry. Sometime in the first half of the eighteenth century, he moved to East Java with two of his elder brothers, the Chinese-Javanese leader Soero Pernollo (1720 – 1776) and Han Hing Kong.

By 1748 at the latest, Han Bwee Kong had contracted a highly advantageous marriage to the Peranakan daughter of a prominent Chinese leader in Surabaya, Tan Ho Goan (1672 – 1744). The couple had twelve sons and two daughters. Probably as a result of his wife's family backing, Han Bwee Kong was eventually appointed Kapitein der Chinezen of Surabaya at an unknown date. This position gave him governmental authority over the Chinese community of Surabaya as part of the Dutch colonial system of Indirect Rule.

In 1768, with the help of his elder brother, the ennobled Ngabehi Soero Pernollo, police chief of Besuki and Panarukan, Kapitein Han Bwee Kong became the leaseholder of the district of Besuki for an annual tribute of 10 koyans of rice and 1,000 rixdollars to the Dutch East India Company. In exchange, he helped his brother's son, the future Adipati Soero Adinegoro, obtain a government appointment as Ronggo of Besuki in 1772. The Kapitein further obtained the lease for the district of Panarukan in 1777 for an annual tribute to the Company of 500 Spanish dollars.

He died in 1778, and is buried together with his wife in Pasar Bong, or Market of the Chinese Cemetery, in Surabaya. He is identified on his tombstone by the personal name of 'Zhensi', or 'He who Shakes Surabaya'.

His eldest son and deputy, Han Khee Bing, Luitenant der Chinezen (1749 – 1768) predeceased him. So, he was succeeded as Kapitein der Chinezen of Surabaya and leaseholder of Besuki and Panarukan by his fifth and eldest surviving son, Han Chan Piet, Majoor der Chinezen (1759 – 1827). Another son, Han Kik Ko, Majoor der Chinezen (1766 – 1813), also attained prominence as Majoor der Chinezen, Temenggong and landlord of the district Probolinggo. Kapitein Han Bwee Kong's descendants, as part of the baba bangsawan or Cabang Atas, or the Chinese gentry of Java, would play a significant role in the political and economic life of colonial Indonesia until the end of Dutch rule in 1945.

Government offices
| Unknown | Majoor der Chinezen of Surabaya early 1700s–1778 | Succeeded by Majoor Han Chan Piet |
