= Han Chan Piet =

Peranakan Chinese magnate, government official and landlord

Majoor Han Chan Piet

Kapitein der Chinezen of Surabaya
- In office 1778–1810
- Preceded by: Kapitein Han Bwee Kong
- Succeeded by: unknown

Personal details
- Born: 1759 Surabaya, East Java
- Died: 1827 (aged 67–68) Surabaya, East Java
- Relations: Han Siong Kong (grandfather) Han Kik Ko, Majoor der Chinezen (brother); Ngabehi Soero Pernollo (uncle) Adipati Soero Adinegoro (cousin)
- Children: Han Kok Tie, Luitenant der Chinezen; Han Kok Ping, Kapitein der Chinezen
- Parent: Han Bwee Kong, Kapitein der Chinezen (father)
- Occupation: Majoor der Chinezen, landlord

Han Chan Piet, Majoor der Chinezen (1759 – 1827), also spelt Han Tjan Piet or Han Tian Pit, was a Peranakan Chinese magnate, government official and landlord in East Java. He is best remembered for having bought the districts of Besuki and Panarukan in 1810 from the colonial government.

== Family background ==
Han Chan Piet Sia was born in 1759 in Surabaya, the third of twelve sons, to Han Bwee Kong (1727 – 1778), and was as such a grandson of the Chinese-born migrant Han Siong Kong (1672 – 1743), founder of the powerful Han family of Lasem. His father, Han Bwee Kong, held the civil government position of Kapitein der Chinezen, which gave him legal and political authority over the Chinese community of Surabaya as part of the Dutch colonial policy of Indirect Rule. The Kapitein was also Pachter, or leaseholder, of the districts of Besuki (from 1768) and Panarukan (from 1777). As the son of a Chinese officer, Han Chan Piet bore the hereditary title 'Sia'.

Other prominent members of his family include his younger brother, Han Kik Ko, Majoor der Chinezen (1766 – 1813); his uncle, the Muslim convert and Javanese magnate Ngabehi Soero Pernollo (1720 – 1776); and his cousins, the Javanese noblemen and bureaucrats Adipati Soero Adinegoro (1752 – 1833) and Raden Soero Adiwikromo. His family played an important role in the consolidation of Dutch rule, as well as the subsequent administration and economic development, of East Java.

== Colonial career ==
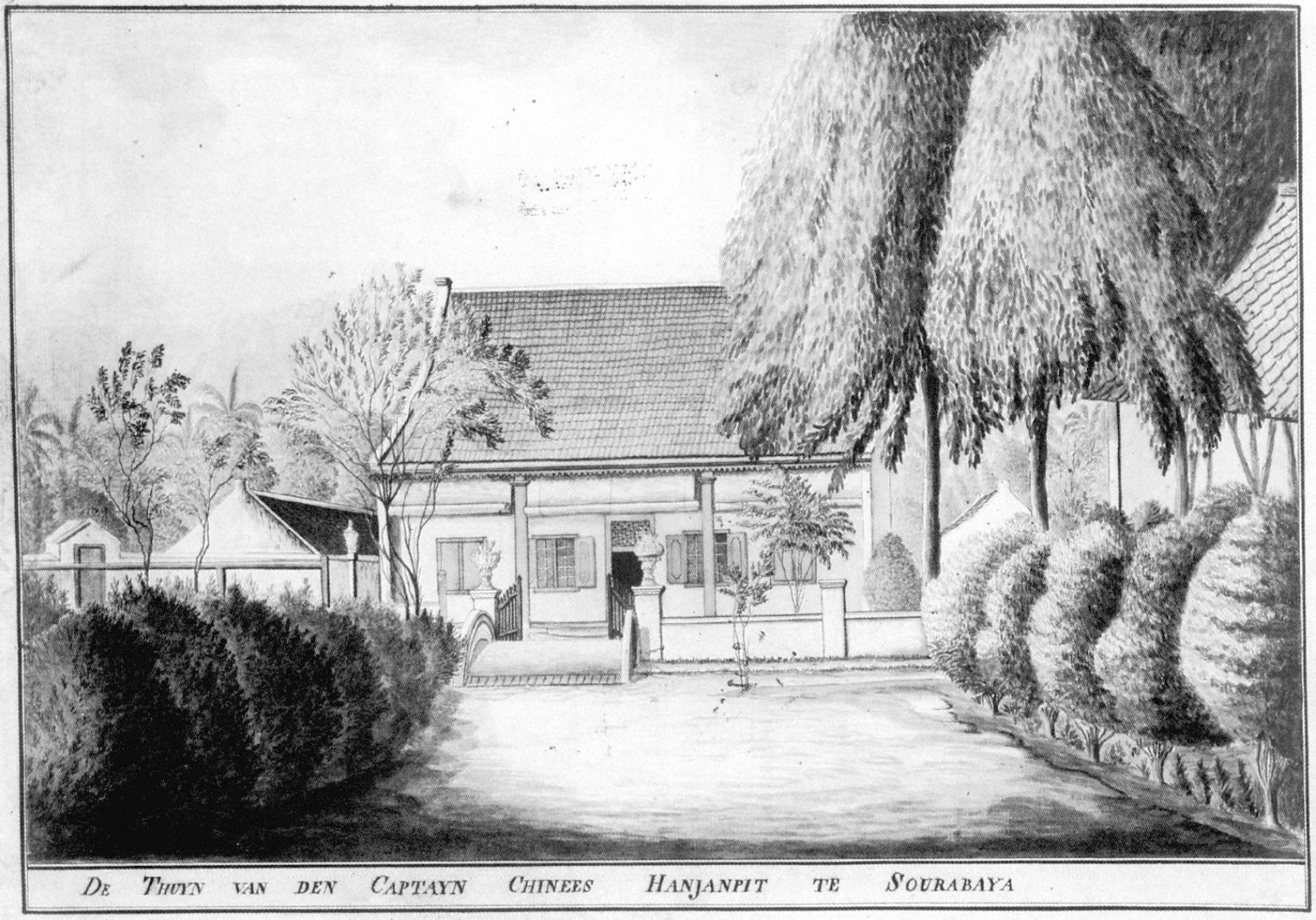
Country House of Han Chan Piet, Majoor der Chinezen

Han Chan Piet was first appointed to the colonial bureaucracy when he was made his father's deputy in Surabaya, at an unknown date, with the title of Luitenant der Chinezen. The Lieutenant succeeded his father on the latter's death in 1778 as both Kapitein der Chinezen of Surabaya and Pachter of the districts of Besuki and Panarukan. In 1796, the Dutch East India Company further granted the Kapitein exclusive rights to the two districts for life.

During the French and British Interregnum (1806 – 1815), Herman Willem Daendels, Governor-General of the Dutch East Indies, decided to fill up state coffers by selling government land, including in 1810 the districts of Besuki and Panarukan. Kapitein Han Chan Piet bought both districts outright for 400,000 Spanish dollars, and was subsequently promoted by Daendels to the dignity of Majoor der Chinezen.

The new Majoor resigned his Chinese Captaincy of Surabaya in 1810, and took up residence in his districts as landlord. The traditional Javanese bureaucracy of the districts was maintained, but had to answer to their landlord. From 1794 until 1813, Raden Panderman, son of the Majoor's cousin Adipati Soero Adinegoro, headed the Javanese bureaucracy of Besuki, first as Ronggo, then from 1804 as Tumanggung. French and British travellers during the Interregnum remarked upon the agricultural and economic development of the region under the Majoor's rule, but criticised his creation of a state within a state. At the same time, Majoor Han Chan Piet encountered difficulties raising enough funds to fulfil his financial obligations towards the colonial government.

In 1813, his younger brother, Han Kik Ko, Majoor der Chinezen, who had purchased the district of Probolinggo and had ruled in an apparently despotic manner, was killed in a local revolt — dubbed Kepruk Cina ('Attack on the Chinese'). The British government under Sir Stamford Raffles, which had misgivings about Daendels' sale of government land, responded by repurchasing Probolinggo from the dead Majoor's heirs. Beset by financial difficulties, Majoor Han Chan Piet took this opportunity to sell back the districts of Besuki and Panarukan as well.

== Aftermath ==
Following the resale of Besuki and Panarukan, Majoor Han Chan Piet returned to the Residency of Surabaya, where he owned and leased a substantial amount of land, including some thirty markets and the country estate of Semimi. He further acquired the estates of Manukan and Petunjungan outside Surabaya. On the Majoor's death in 1827, his sons succeeded their father as Kapitein and Lieutenant der Chinezen of Surabaya, and inherited his estates.

The family link with Besuki and Panarukan was maintained by the Muslim branch of the Han family of Lasem, descended from the Majoor's Javanese cousins, Adipati Soero Adinegoro and Raden Soero Adiwikromo. Their descendants retained government positions in the Eastern Salient of Java, particularly in their stronghold of Besuki.

Government offices
Preceded by Majoor Han Bwee Kong	Majoor der Chinezen of Surabaya early 1778–1827	Unknown
