= Han family of Lasem =

- Cabang Atas
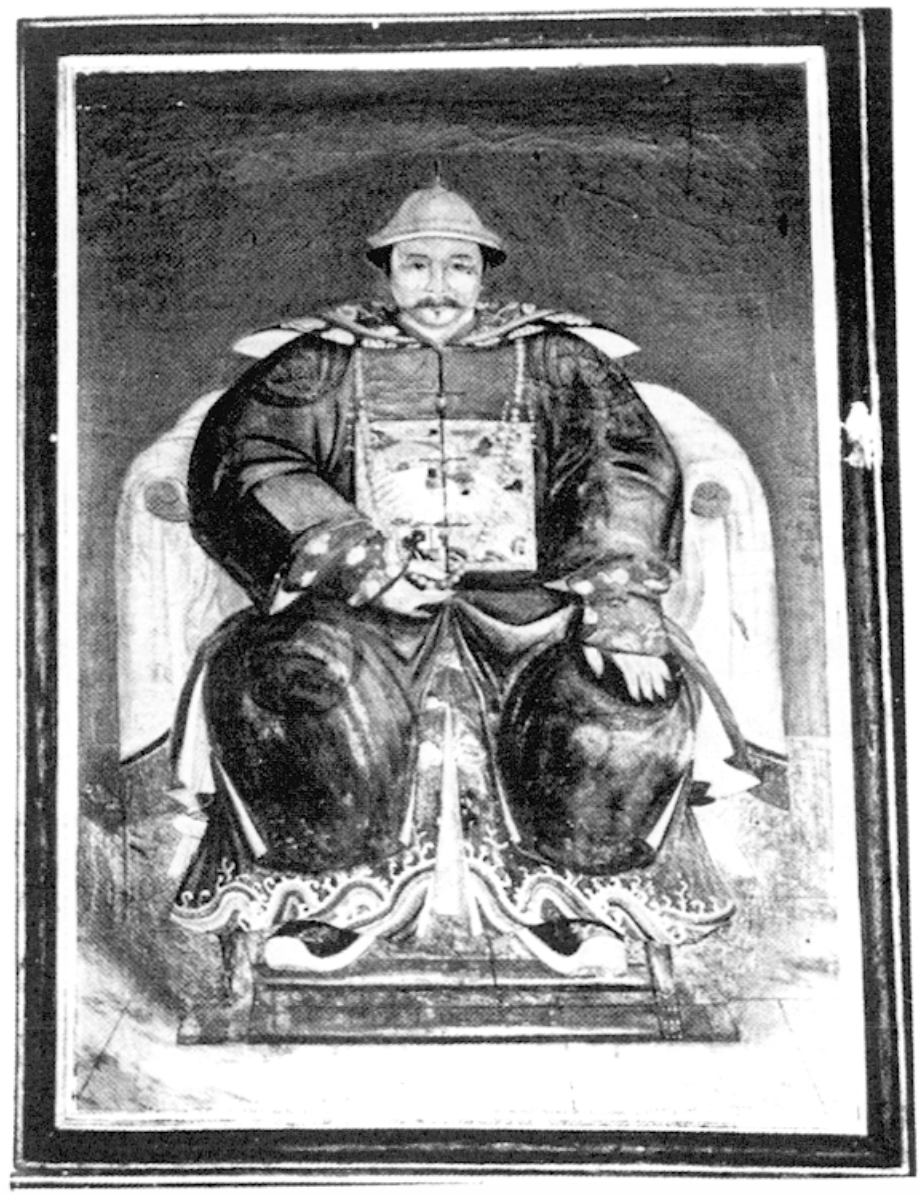
- Han Bwee Kong, Kapitein der Chinezen of Surabaya (1727–1778)
- Country: Dutch East Indies; Indonesia
- Origin: Qing Empire
- Founder: Han Siong Kong (1673-1743)
- Titles: Majoor, Kapitein and Luitenant der Chinezen; Sia; Regent; Tumanggung; Ronggo
- Connected families: The royal family of Sumenep; The family of Surabaya; The Kan-Han family

The Han family of Lasem, also called the Han family of East Java or Surabaya, was an influential, aristocratic family of Peranakan Chinese and Javanese descent in the Dutch East Indies (today known as Indonesia). The Peranakan branch of the dynasty became part of the 'Cabang Atas' or the Chinese gentry of colonial Indonesia, serving as Kapitan Cina or government-appointed community heads, while their Muslim cousins joined the ranks of the Javanese nobility (priyayi). Both lines of the family came to power in the Indies through their alliance with the Dutch East India Company in the 18th century. Originally from Lasem in Central Java, they figured prominently in the consolidation of Dutch rule in East Java and maintained a long tradition of government service in the Dutch colonial bureaucracy.

== Founding and history of the family ==
The family is descended from Han Siong Kong (1673-1743), who migrated to Lasem from Zhangzhou, Fujian, Qing Empire; and from the 12th-century Chinese mandarin Han Hong. Their first attested ancestor, the 7th-century military leader Han Zhaode, was a general in the army of the warlord Chen Yuanguang (657–711) who pacified Fujian for the Tang dynasty.

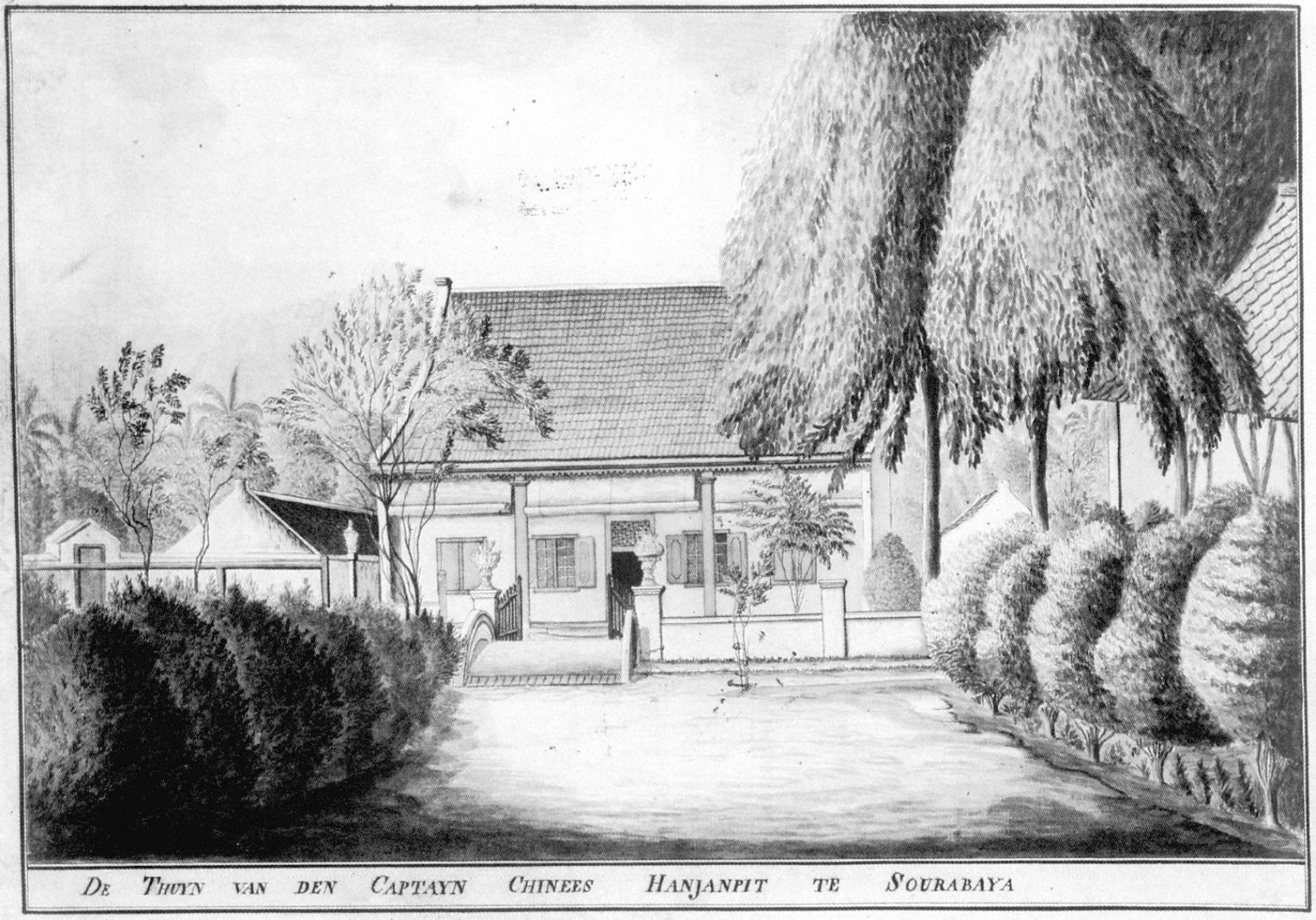
Country House of Han Chan Piet, Majoor der Chinezen (1759 – 1827)

Two of Han Siong Kong's sons, by a daughter of the regent of Rajegwesi according to J. Hageman, played a prominent role in consolidating Dutch rule in East Java in the 18th century. The elder, Soero Pernollo (1720 – 1776), converted to Islam, and served the Dutch East India Company as police chief, harbourmaster of Surabaya and bureaucrat. The younger, Han Bwee Kong (1727 – 1778), became the earliest recorded Dutch-appointed Kapitein der Chinezen, or head of the Chinese community, of Surabaya.

The family reached the peak of their power in the late 18th and early 19th century, in particular during the Interregnum. Allied with Herman Willem Daendels, the Napoleonic governor-general of the Dutch East Indies, the grandsons of Han Siong Kong ruled much of the Eastern Salient of Java as landlords, Chinese officers and regents. One of the grandsons, Han Chan Piet, Majoor der Chinezen (1759 – 1827) purchased from Daendels the districts of Besuki and Panarukan in 1810, while his younger brother, Majoor Han Kik Ko (1766–1813), acquired the district of Probolinggo later that same year. Their cousins from the Muslim branch of the family, Adipati Soero Adinegoro (1752–1833) and Raden Soero Adiwikromo, ruled vast territories as part of the Javanese bureaucracy.

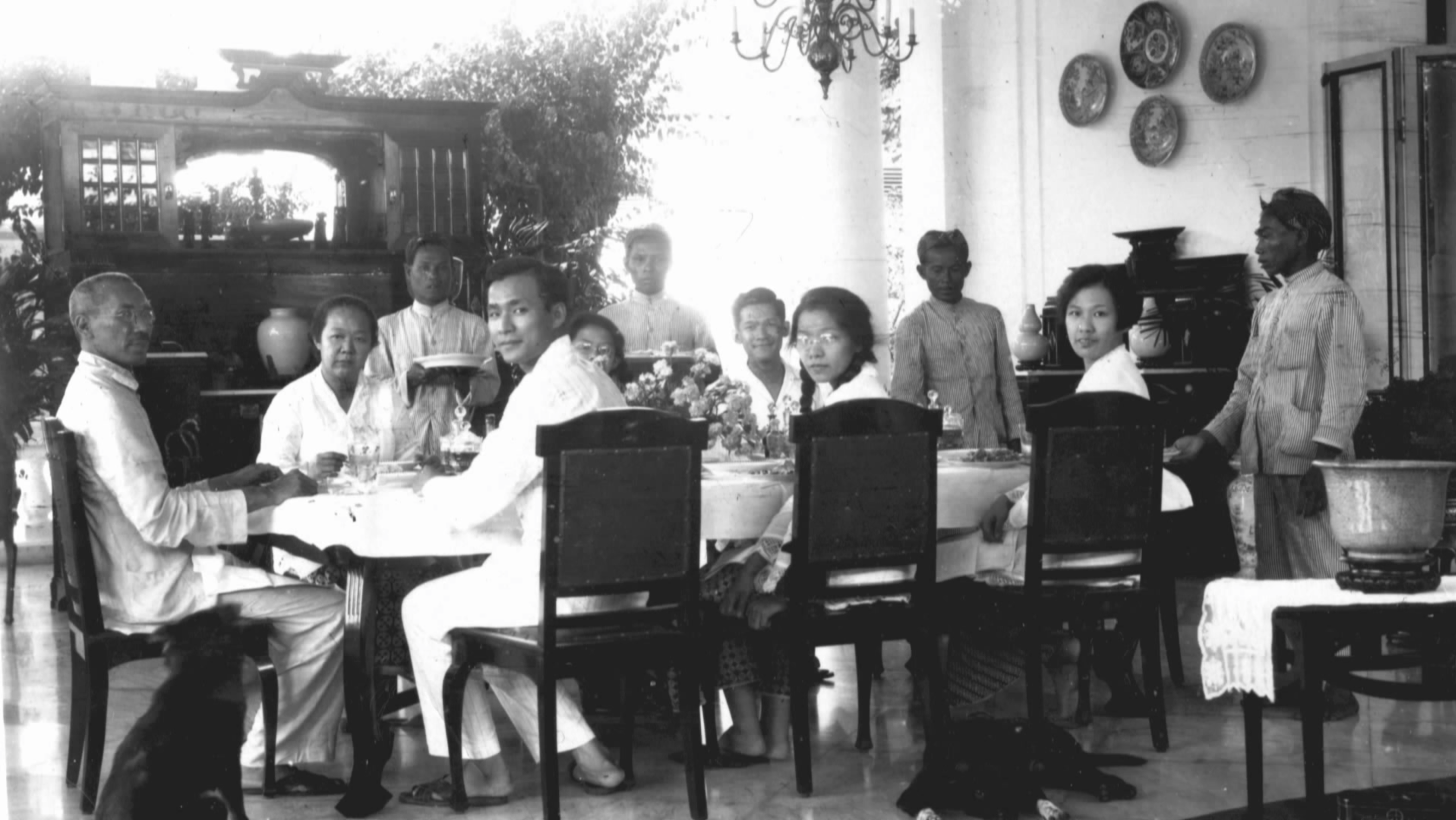
The Han-Kan family, headed by H. H. Kan, early 20th century

In 1813, however, a revolt — the so-called 'Kepruk Cina' — broke out against the family that led to the government's eventual reacquisition of the most important Han domains. This was followed in 1818 by a purge of nearly all Muslim members of the Han family from the colonial bureaucracy.

Nonetheless, the family managed to reestablish their power base, and remained influential as landowners and in public administrators in Surabaya and East Java until the Indonesian revolution (1945—1950). Indeed, in Han Tjiong Khing (1866—1933), the family provided Surabaya with its last Majoor der Chinezen. Beyond East Java, prominent branches were also established in Batavia, Semarang and Aceh in the second half of the nineteenth century. The prominent politician Hok Hoei Kan (1881—1951), member of the Volksraad, chair of Chung Hwa Hui (CHH) and community leader, belonged through his father to the Batavia branch of the family. Kan's distant cousin, parliamentary and CHH colleague Han Tiauw Tjong belonged to the Aceh branch of the family.

== Notable members ==
- Adipati Soero Adinegoro or Han Sam Kong (1752–1833), Chinese-Javanese nobleman and bureaucrat
- Han Chan Piet, Majoor-titulair der Chinezen of Besuki and Panarukan (1759–1827), bureaucrat and landlord
- Han Kik Ko, Majoor-titulair der Chinezen, Regent of Probolinggo (1766–1813), bureaucrat and landlord
- Han Oen Lee, Lieutenant der Chinezen of Bekasi (1856—1893), bureaucrat and landlord
- Han Tjiong Khing, Majoor der Chinezen of Surabaya (1866—1933), bureaucrat
- Hok Hoei Kan (1881—1951), colonial politician, member of the Volksraad and landlord
- Han Tiauw Tjong (1894 – 1940), colonial politician, member of the Volksraad
- Ong Hok Ham (1933—2007), historian

== Gallery ==
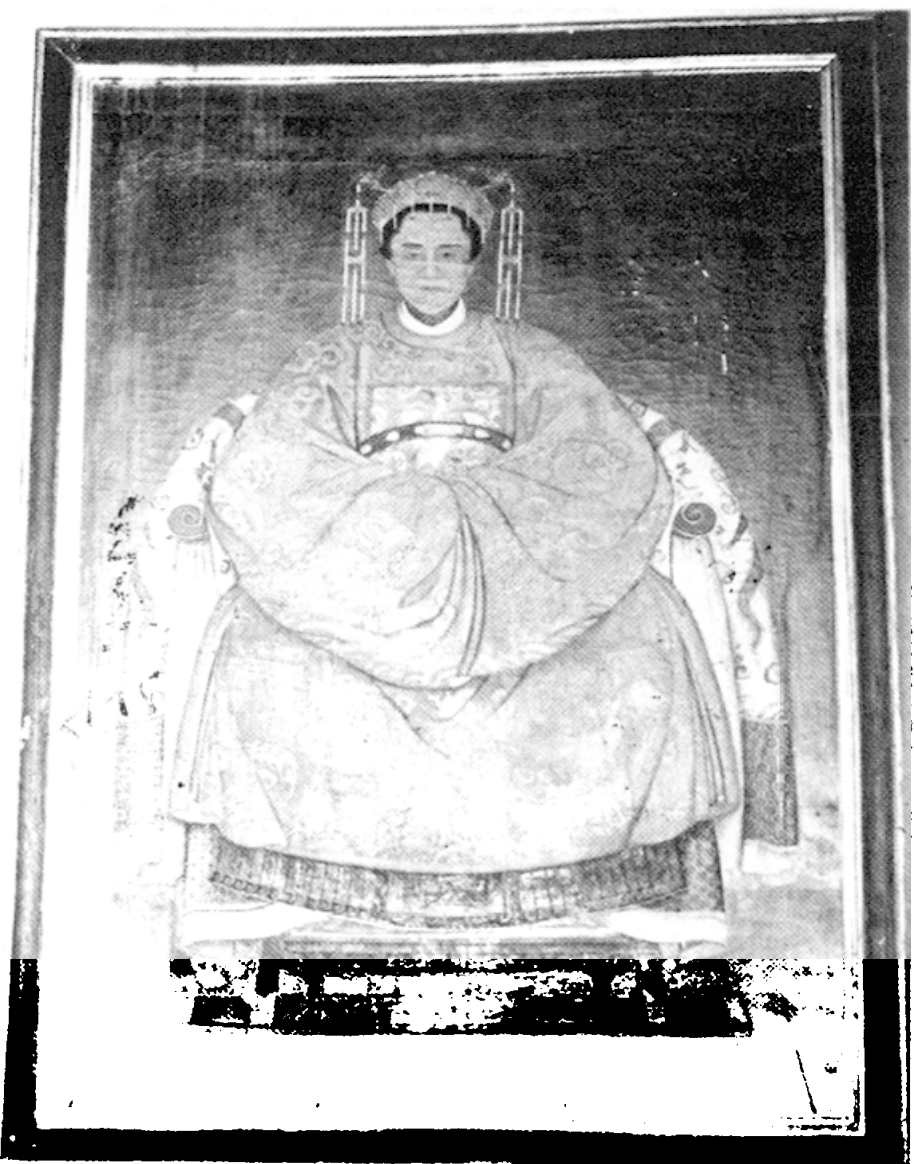
Tan Ciguan (1730–1778), wife of Kapitein Han Bwee Kong

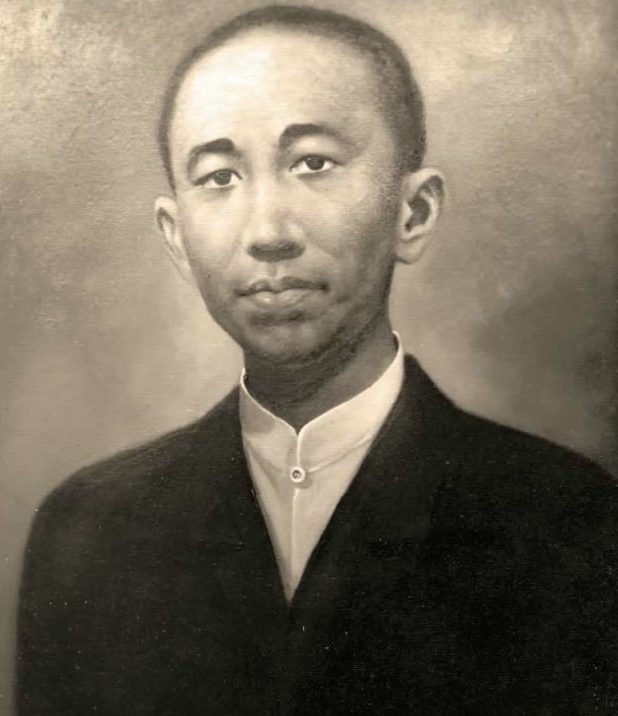
Han Oen Lee, Luitenant der Chinezen of Bekasi (1856—1893)

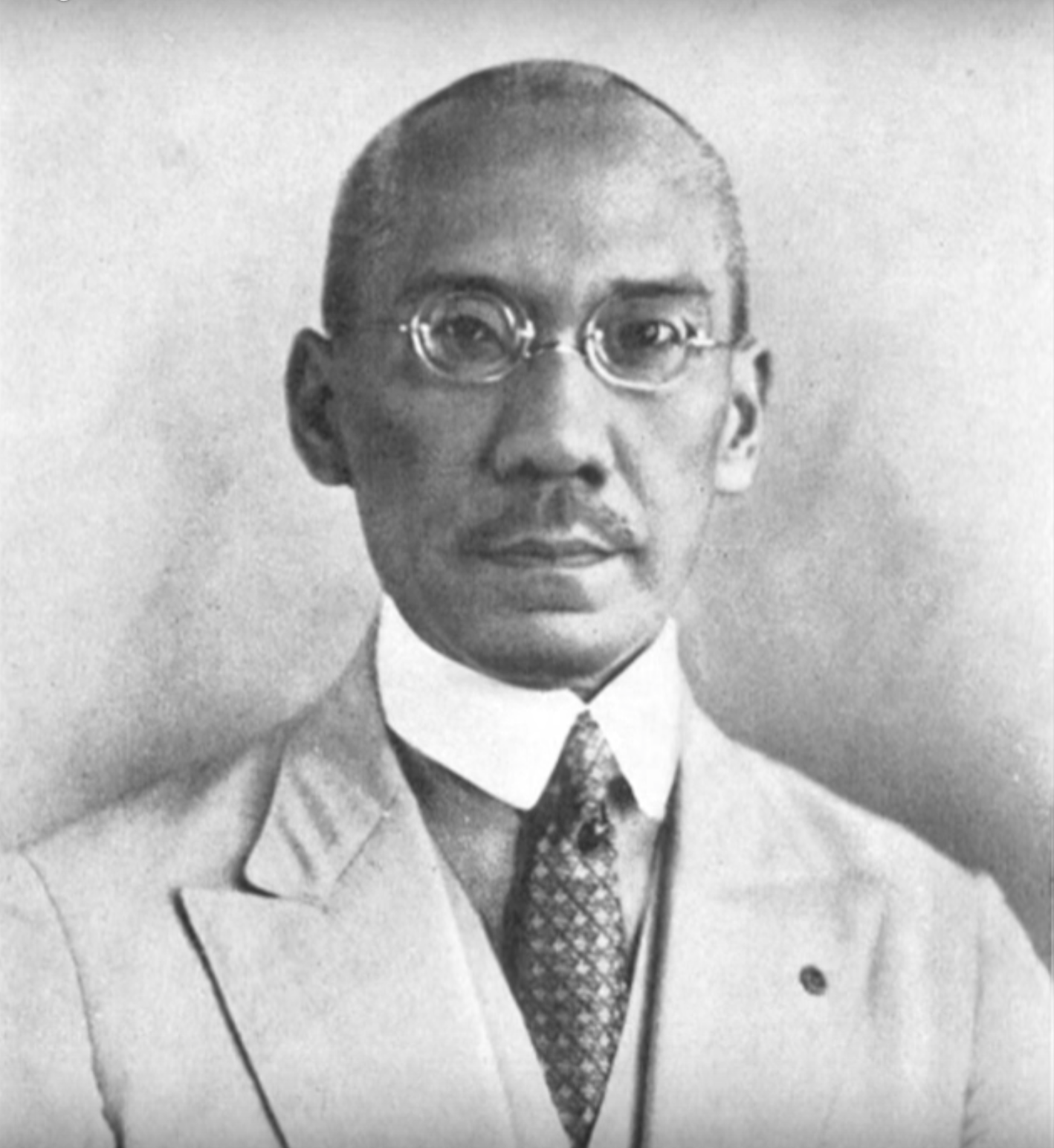
The politician Hok Hoei Kan (1881–1951)
