= Soero Adinegoro =

Chinese-Javanese nobleman

Ronggo of Besuki
- In office 1772–1776
- Constituency: Besuki

Tumanggung of Bangil
- Constituency: Bangil

Regent of Malang, Sidayu & Tuban
- In office 1809–1818
- Constituency: Malang, Sidayu & Tuban

Personal details
- Born: 1752 East Java
- Died: 1833 East Java
- Relations: Han Siong Kong (grandfather) Kyai Tumanggung Soero Adhi Negoro (grandson); Raden Soero Adiwikromo (brother); Pakunataningrat I, Sultan of Sumenep (brother-in-law); Han Bwee Kong, Kapitein der Chinezen (uncle); Han Chan Piet, Majoor der Chinezen (cousin) Han Kik Ko, Majoor der Chinezen (cousin)
- Children: Raden Panderman
- Parent: Ngabehi Soero Pernollo (father)
- Occupation: Government bureaucrat, priyayi

Adipati Soero Adinegoro (1752–1833), also spelt Adipati Suroadinegoro, born Han Sam Kong (Chinese: 韓三江), and sometimes known as Baba Sam, was a Chinese-Javanese nobleman and government official, famous during his lifetime for the good governance of his territories.

== Family background ==
He was born in 1752 to Ngabehi Soero Pernollo (1720 – 1776), founder of the Muslim branch of the Han family of Lasem, and was as such a grandson of the Chinese-born Han Siong Kong (1672 – 1743). His father, Ngabehi Soero Pernollo, served the Dutch East India Company in various capacities before being appointed politiehoofd, or police head, of Besuki and Panarukan in 1764. One of his sisters married Pakunataningrat I, Sultan of Sumenep (reigned 1812 - 1854). Other prominent members of his family include his younger brother, Raden Soero Adiwikromo; his uncle, Han Bwee Kong, Kapitein der Chinezen (1727 – 1778); and his cousins, Han Chan Piet, Majoor der Chinezen (1759 – 1827), and Han Kik Ko, Majoor der Chinezen (1766 – 1813). His family played an important role in the consolidation of Dutch rule and subsequent administration of East Java.

== Government career ==
Baba Sam's career in the colonial administration began with his appointment by the Dutch East India Company in 1772 as Ronggo, or district head, of Besuki under the Javanese name of Soemodiwirjo. He obtained this post thanks to the intercession of his powerful uncle, Han Bwee Kong, Kapitein der Chinezen of Surabaya and Pachter, or leaseholder, of the district of Besuki. In 1776, Baba Sam was promoted to the higher position of Tumanggung of Bangil with the successive noble titles of Ngabehi Soero Widjojo (1776 – 1788) and Tumanggung Soero Adinegoro (1788 – 1808). According to Jacques Julien de Labillardière and Ch. F. Tombe, French travellers during the Interregnum in Java (1806 – 1815), the Tumanggung not only spoke good Dutch, but was also a keen admirer of Napoleon Bonaparte and the latter's administrative policies in Europe.

Herman Willem Daendels, Governor-General of the Dutch East Indies (1808 – 1811) during the Interregnum, paid a visit to the Tumanggung's district of Bangil in 1808. Impressed by the good governance of the district, Daendels later that same year made the Tumanggung a Ridder, or Knight, in the Order of Holland, recently founded in 1807 by Louis Bonaparte, King of Holland.

A year later, in 1809, Daendels conferred upon the Tumanggung the dignity of Adipati, the highest title in the priyayi, or Javanese aristocracy. Adipati Soero Adinegoro was also elevated to the post of Regent of Malang. Later, the regencies of Sidayu and Tuban were added to his now considerable jurisdiction. Many of his sons also held government appointments in the colonial administration.

In 1818, however, the Adipati and his sons were suddenly relieved of their government positions. It was thought that the Dutch government felt threatened by the organised power of the Han family of Lasem, and wanted to reassert control over the Eastern Salient of Java.

Adipati Soero Adinegoro died in 1833.

== Descendants ==
The Adipati had a total of twenty-six children. He gave up one of them, Raden Panderman (born in 1778), in adoption to his childless successor and younger brother, Raden Soero Adiwikromo, who was Ronggo of Besuki (1776), Tumanggung of Puger and Bondowoso (1796), and finally Regent of Tegal. Raden Panderman eventually succeeded his adoptive father and uncle, with the patronage of Majoor Han Chan Piet, the landlord of Besuki, as Ronggo of Besuki in 1794, Tumanggung of Puger and Besuki in 1804, then as Regent of Puger in 1813, but was demoted along with his other brothers in the purge of 1818.

Raden Panderman's issue, however, managed to retain their position in the colonial administration, and continued their family's tradition of public service in East Java. The most prominent line descending from Raden Panderman is that of his son, Raden Karaman, later known as Kyai Tumanggung Soero Adhi Negoro, who was appointed Tumanggung of Kendal, then Regent of Probolinggo in 1856. The latter was succeeded in Kendal by his son, Pangeran Ario Noto Amiprodjo; grandson, Raden Mas Adipati Ario Notonegoro; and great-grandson, Raden Mas Adipati Ario Notohamidjojo, who all served successively as Regents of Kendal.
