= Soero Pernollo =

Kyai Ronggo Ngabehi Soero Pernollo

Politiehoofd van den Osthoek
- In office 1764–1776
- Constituency: Oesthoek (now East Java)

Personal details
- Born: 1720 Lasem, Central Java
- Died: 1776 East Java
- Relations: Raden Panderman (grandson) Han Bwee Kong, Kapitein der Chinezen (brother); Han Chan Piet, Majoor der Chinezen (nephew); Han Kik Ko, Majoor der Chinezen (nephew) Pakunataningrat I, Sultan of Sumenep (son-in-law)
- Children: Adipati Soero Adinegoro; Raden Soero Adiwikromo
- Parent: Han Siong Kong (father)
- Occupation: Police head, harbourmaster

Kyai Ronggo Ngabehi Soero Pernollo (1720 – 1776), or Surapernala, born Han Tjien Kong (Chinese: 韓震公; Pe̍h-ōe-jī: Hân Chín-kong), was a Chinese-Javanese nobleman, government official and ally of the Dutch East India Company. He founded the senior Muslim branch of the Han family of Lasem, a branch that became part of the Javanese priyayi, or aristocracy, and distinguished itself in the history of East Java.

Han Tjien Kong was born in 1720 at Lasem, a port city in Central Java, to Han Siong Kong (1672 – 1743), a Chinese migrant of ancient lineage, and a mother of at least part-native ancestry whose name is unknown. He had four brothers, including the younger Han Bwee Kong, Kapitein der Chinezen (1727 – 1778). Han Tjien Kong converted to Islam at an unknown date, and subsequently assumed the Javanese name of Soero Pernollo.

Sometime in the mid-eighteenth century, Soero Pernollo moved to East Java, at the time still a frontier territory contested by the Dutch East India Company, the Mataram Sultanate and the Balinese princely state of Mengwi. He entered the service of Hendrik Breton, a senior official of the Company. Breton held the post of Resident of Rembang, and was promoted in 1763 to Opperhofd van den Osthoek, or 'High Head of the Eastern Salient', before his eventual elevation in 1768 to the powerful Raad van Indië. Throughout this period, Soero Pernollo was Breton's right-hand man, initially as gezaghebber, or overseer, of three merchant ships, then as harbourmaster of Surabaya, the most important commercial entrepôt in East Java.

During the consolidation of Dutch rule in the Eastern Salient, Soero Pernollo was appointed politiehoofd, or police chief, of Besuki and Panarukan in 1764 with the Javanese noble title of Ngabehi. In this capacity, he played an important role as a source of military intelligence for the Company during the Dutch-Blambangan War of 1767 to 1768. It was thanks to his influence that his younger brother, Kapitein Han Bwee Kong, eventually managed to acquire the lease for the districts of Besuki in 1768, and of Panarukan in 1777.

In 1776, Soero Pernollo died, but his two sons, Adipati Soero Adinegoro and Raden Soero Adiwikromo, both attained prominence as government officials, particularly during the French and British interludes in the Dutch East Indies (1806 – 1815). One of his daughters married a fellow ally of the Dutch East India Company, Pakunataningrat I, Sultan of Sumenep (reigned 1812 - 1854). Their descendants continued to play an important role in the colonial administration of East Java.
