= Han Kik Ko =

Peranakan Chinese magnate, government official and landlord

Kapitein der Chinezen of Pasuruan
- In office 1808–1810
- Constituency: Pasuruan, East Java

Regent of Probolinggo
- In office 1810 – 1813 (died in office)
- Preceded by: Unknown
- Succeeded by: Raden Soetik
- Constituency: Probolinggo, East Java

Personal details
- Born: 1766 Surabaya, East Java
- Died: 1813 (aged 46–47) Probolinggo, East Java
- Relations: Han Siong Kong (grandfather) Han Chan Piet, Majoor der Chinezen (brother); Ngabehi Soero Pernollo (uncle) Adipati Soero Adinegoro (cousin)
- Children: Han Tjan Goan, Kapitein der Chinezen
- Parent: Han Bwee Kong, Kapitein der Chinezen (father)
- Occupation: Majoor der Chinezen, priyayi, landlord

Han Kik Ko, Majoor der Chinezen, Regent van Probolinggo (1766–1813), also known as Han Tik Ko in European sources, was a Peranakan Chinese magnate, government official and landlord in East Java. He was a pioneer of the sugar industry in East Java, and acquired the district of Probolinggo which he ruled as despot. His rule resulted in a peasant uprising in 1813, in which he was killed.

== Family background ==
Han Kik Ko Sia was born in Surabaya in 1767, the fifth of twelve sons, to Han Bwee Kong (1727–1778), and was a grandson of the Chinese migrant Han Siong Kong (1673–1743), founder of the powerful Han family of Lasem. His father, Han Bwee Kong, held the civil government post of Kapitein der Chinezen, which gave him legal and political authority over the Chinese community of Surabaya. As the son of a Chinese officer, Han Kik Ko bore the hereditary title 'Sia'.

Other prominent members of his family include his elder brother and fellow landlord, Han Chan Piet, Majoor der Chinezen (1759–1827); his uncle, the Muslim convert and magnate, Ngabehi Soero Pernollo (1720–1776); and his cousins, the Javanese noblemen and bureaucrats Adipati Soero Adinegoro (1752–1833) and Raden Soero Adiwikromo. His family played an important role in the consolidation of Dutch rule in East Java in the mid-eighteenth century, and the subsequent administration and economic development of the region.

== Landlord and official ==
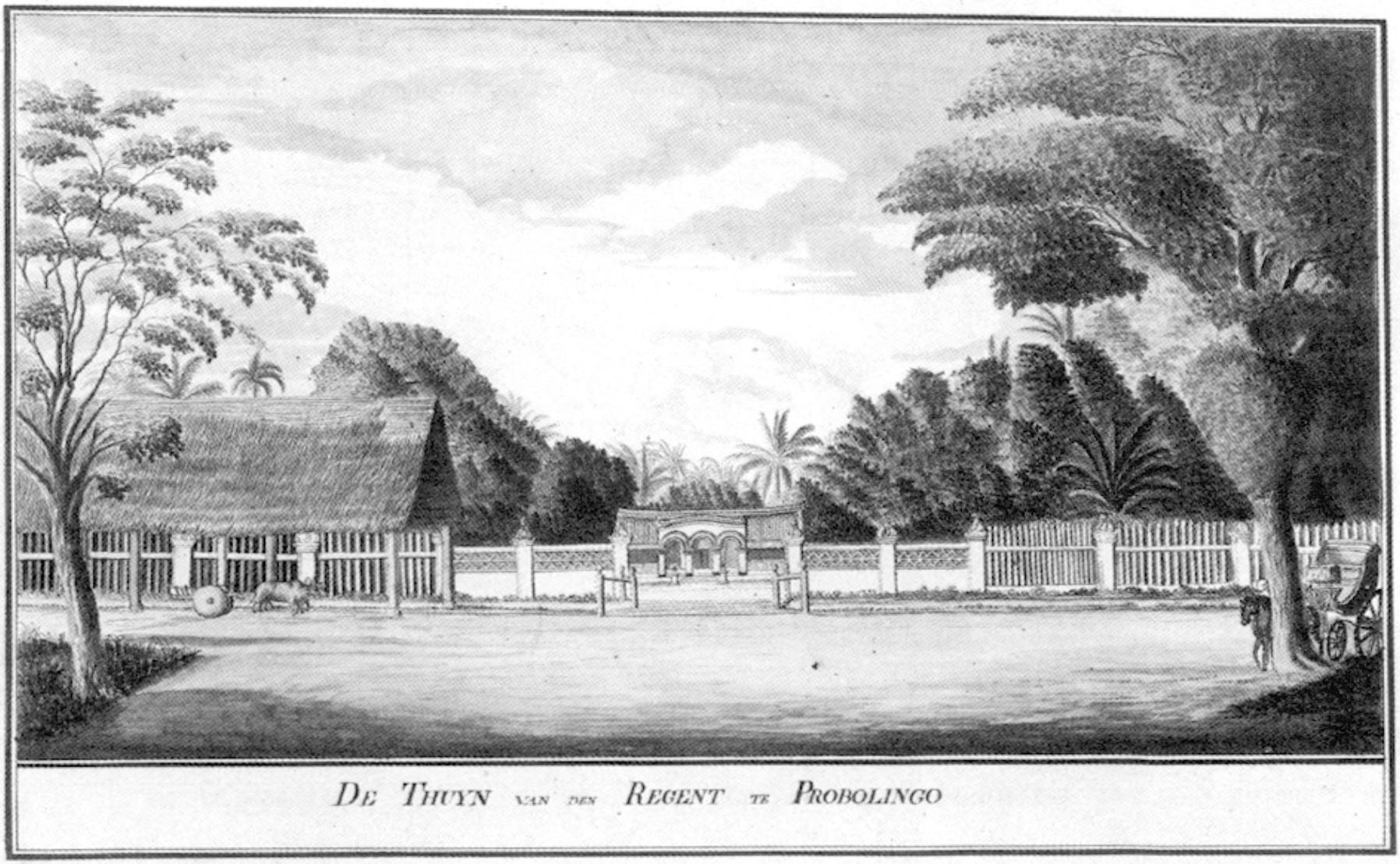
Residence of Han Kik Ko, Majoor der Chinezen as Regent of Porbolinggo

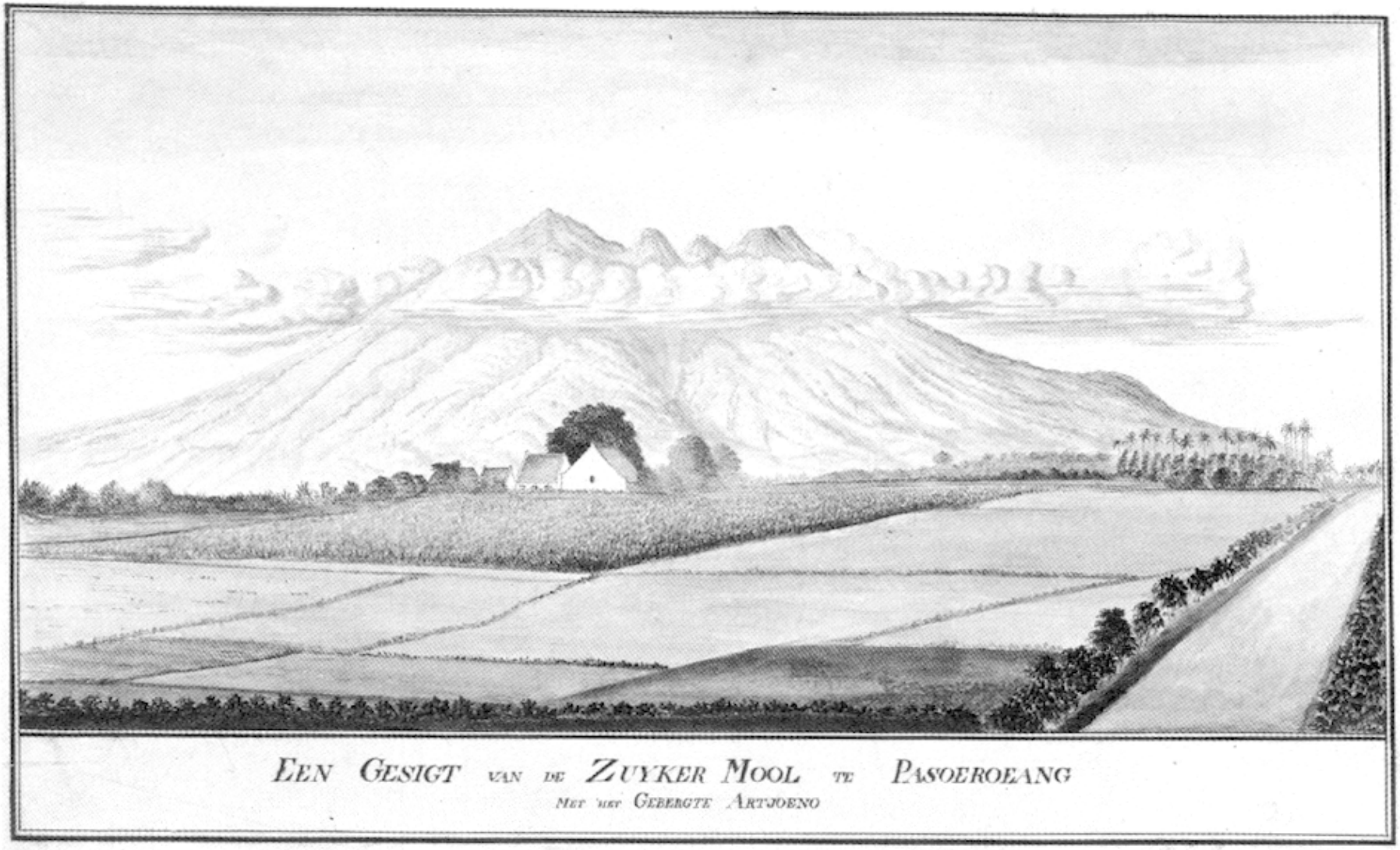
Sugar Mill in Pasuruan, presumably belonging to Majoor Han Kik Ko

By the early nineteenth century, Han Kik Ko was already a significant landlord in East Java. He owned land outside Surabaya, and rented a country estate in Kraton, in the Residency of Pasuruan, consisting of 12 villages and 2,538 residents. His first government appointment was as Kapitein der Chinezen of Pasuruan.

The Kapitein played an important role as a pioneer in the sugar industry in East Java. The region's oldest sugar mill, dating to 1799, was established by the Kapitein on his estate in Pasuruan.

In 1810, after the purchase of Besuki and Panarukan by Majoor Han Chan Piet, the Kapitein followed his elder brother's example by buying the district of Probolinggo. He agreed to pay one million Spanish dollars in a series of instalments to the government of Herman Willem Daendels, Governor-General of the Dutch East Indies during the Interregnum (1806–1815).

Daendels subsequently promoted the Kapitein to Majoor der Chinezen, as well as Regent of Probolinggo with the Javanese noble title of Tumanggung. The new Majoor-Regent had direct authority over 150,000 people; his brother, Majoor Han Chan Piet, ruled the districts of Besuki and Panarukan through allied members of the traditional Javanese bureaucracy, including Muslim members of the Han family of Lasem.

During Majoor Han Kik Ko's rule new methods of irrigation were implemented, rice cultivation increased, and new crops were introduced. The Majoor-Regent also encouraged Madurese immigration into his territory in order to increase its population.

He was accused of despotism in his rule of Probolinggo; fifty percent of all crops grown in the district was taken as tribute and the rest was purchased compulsorily by the Majoor-Regent for a low price. There were taxes on many other things, from living people to funerals and buffaloes.

On 18 May 1813, an uprising broke out – later dubbed Kepruk Cina ('Attack on the Chinese'). At the time, Majoor Han Kik Ko was entertaining visiting British dignitaries, all of whom were caught unaware. The Majoor-Regent and some of his guests were killed by the rebels.

== Aftermath ==
The British government of Sir Stamford Raffles, who had succeeded Daendels as Governor-General, repurchased the district from the Majoor-Regent's heirs. In return, three of the latter's sons were given a lifelong usufruct of the district.

The family connection with both Pasuruan and Probolinggo was maintained. Four of the Majoor-Regent's sons were active in the sugar industry in Pasuruan, and left descendants who maintained their prominence in the region. Han Tjan Gwan, second son of the Majoor-Regent, moved back to Probolinggo and was appointed its Kapitein der Chinezen from 1847 until 1860.

Descendants of the Majoor's Javanese uncle, Ngabehi Soero Pernollo, also maintained government positions in Probolinggo. The latter's grandson, Raden Soetik (from 1816 until 1818), and great-grandson, Raden Karaman (in 1856), were both appointed Regents of Probolinggo in succession to their Chinese cousin.
