= Probolinggo =

City in East Java, Indonesia

Probolinggo: Banger; Caleba; Baleba; Probolingo
- City
- City of Probolinggo; Kota Probolinggo

Regional transcription(s)
  - Madurese: Kuthå Prabâlingghâ (Latèn) كوڟا ڤرابۤاليڠک࣭ۤا (Pèghu) ꦏꦸꦛꦦꦿꦧꦭꦶꦁꦒ (Carakan)
  - Javanese: Kottha Pråbålinggå (Gêdrig) كَوڟّا ڤراباليڠڮا (Pégon) ꦏꦺꦴꦛ꧀ꦛꦥꦿꦧꦭꦶꦁꦒ (Hånåcåråkå)
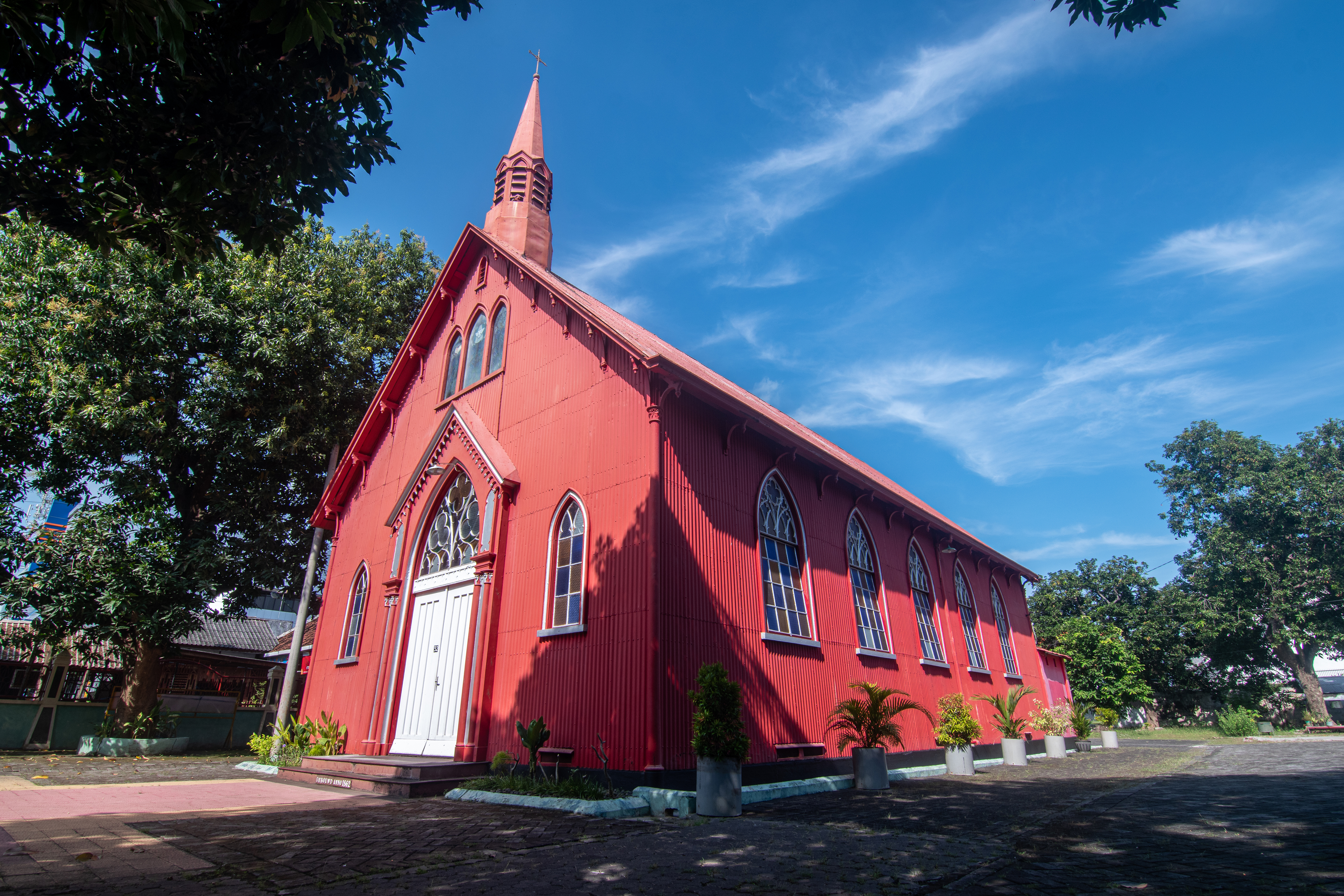
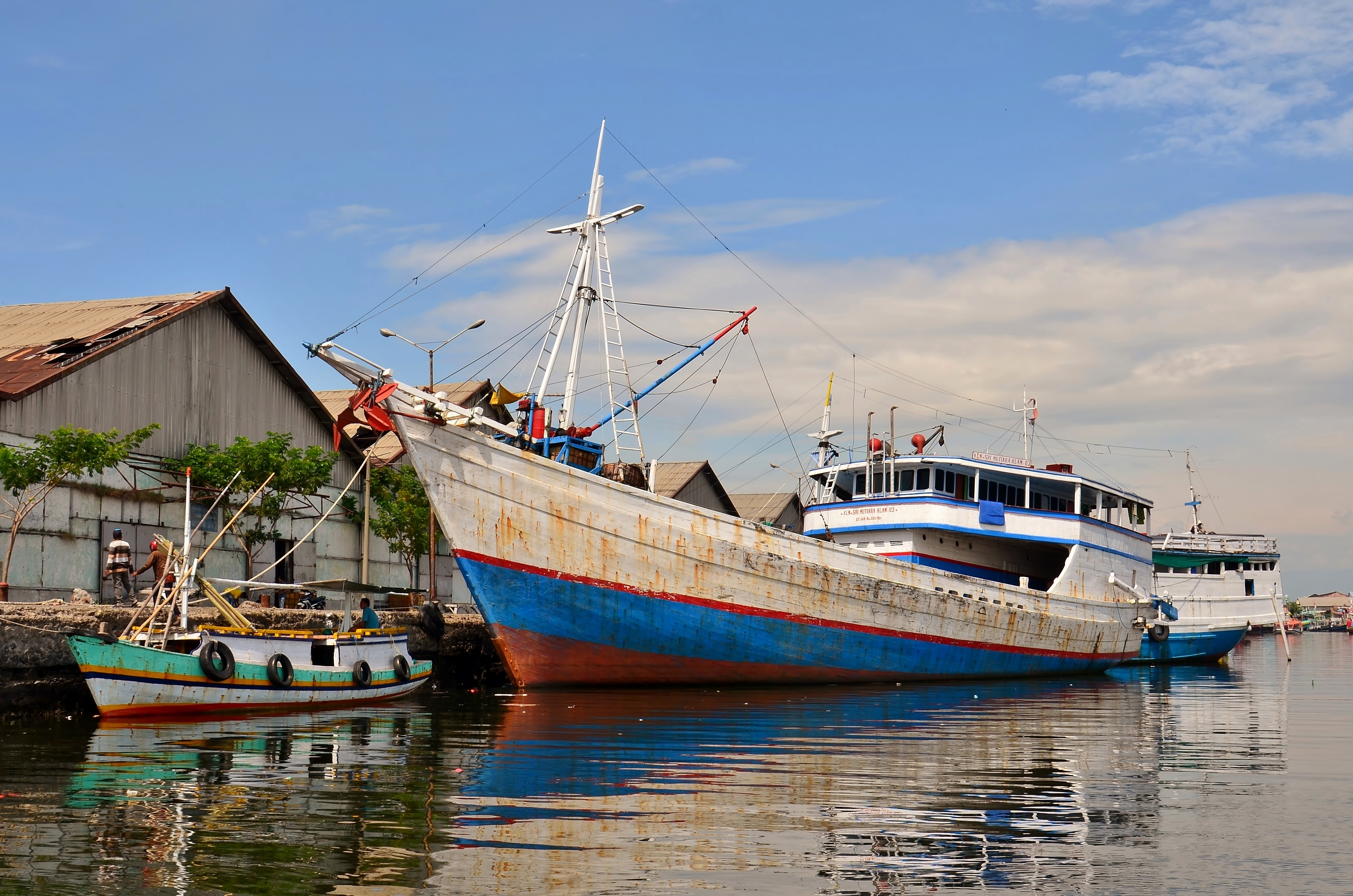
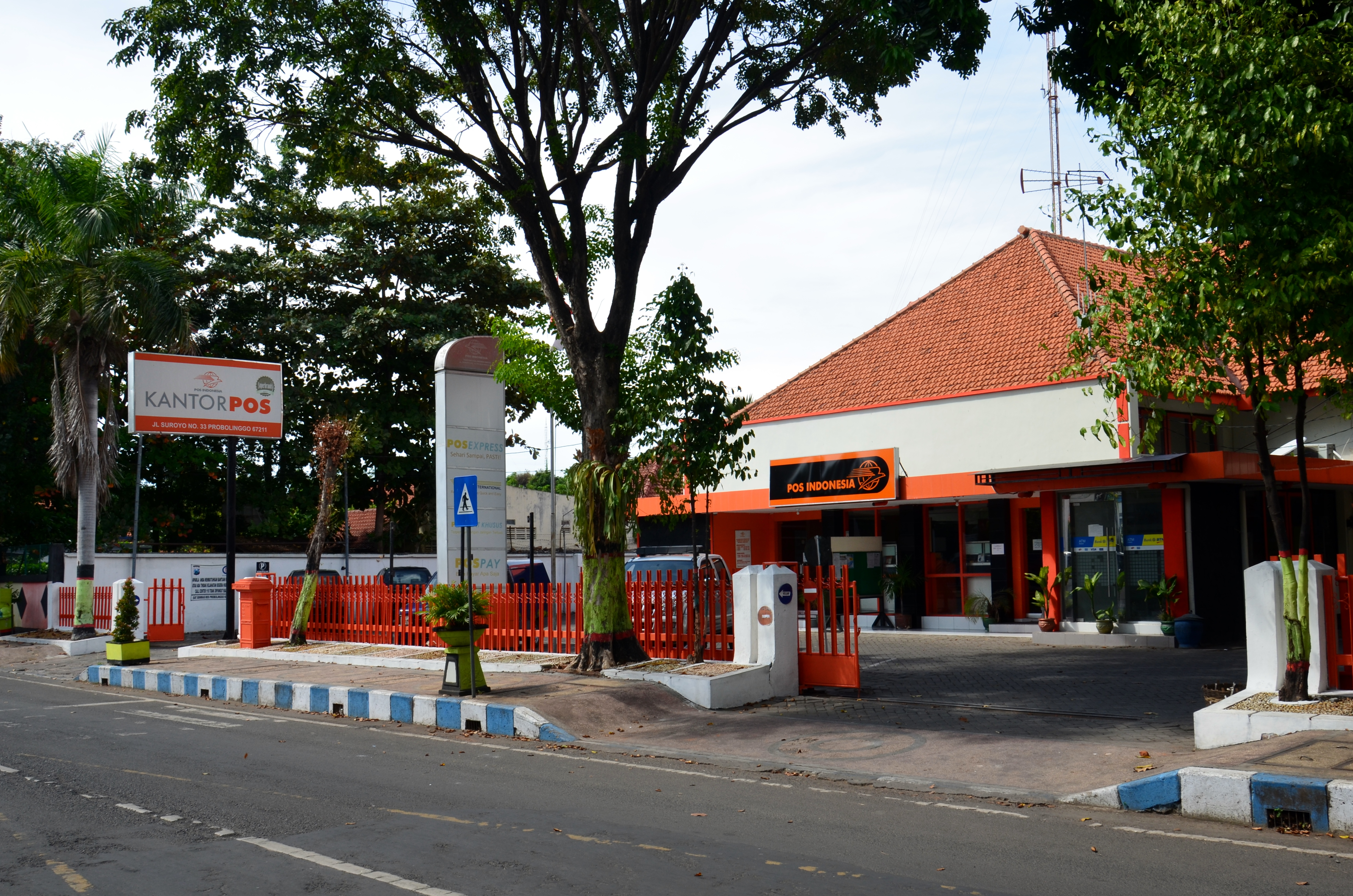
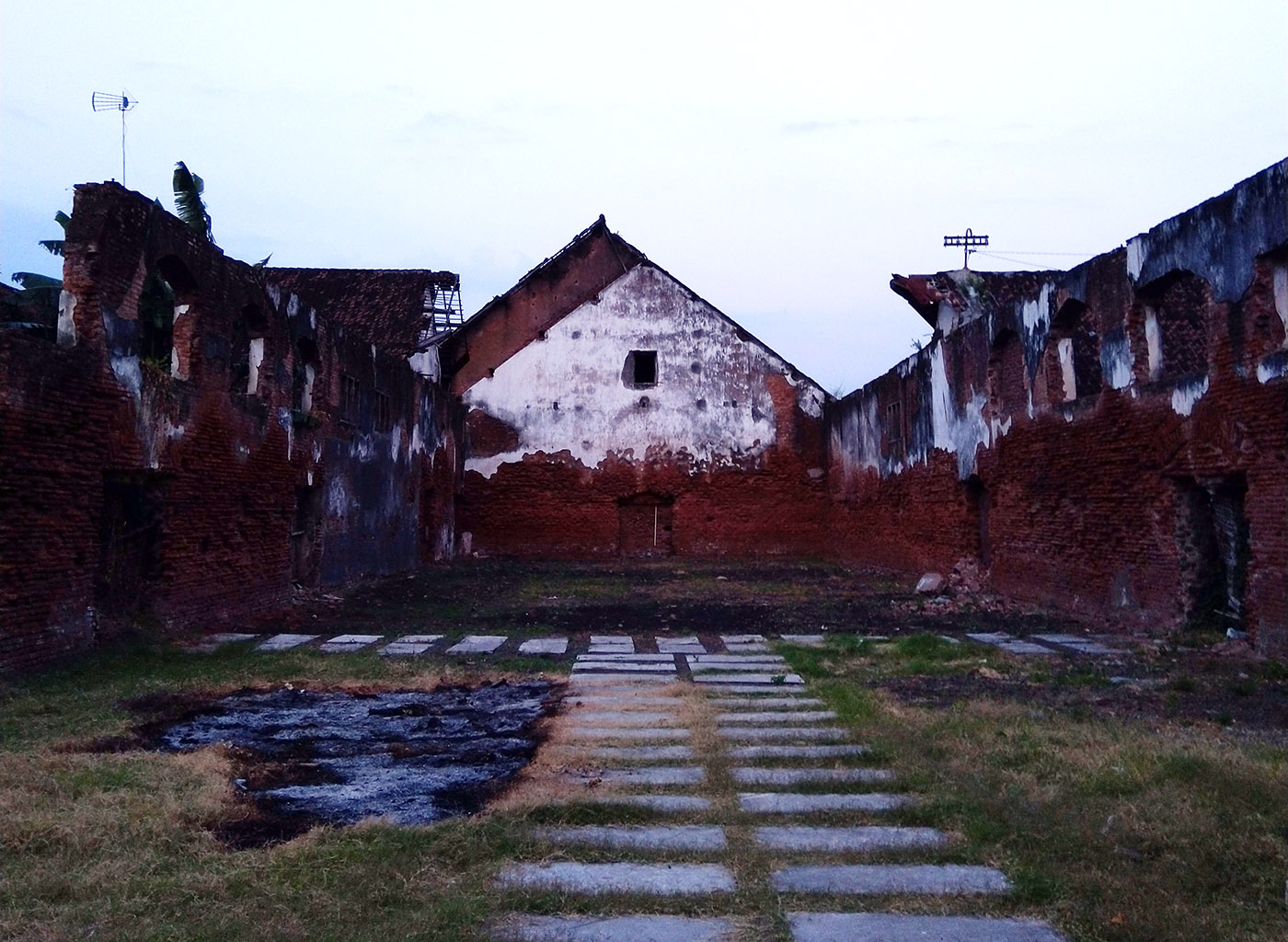
- Red Church, Fishing boats at the port of Probolinggo, Post Office, Mayangan Fort

- Coat of arms
- Nickname: Kota Anggur (City of Grapes)
- Motto: Tri Karsa Bina Praja (Sanskrit) (Developing the city by Three Means)
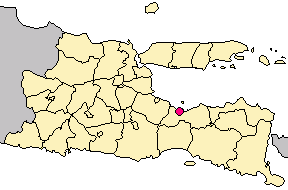
- Location within East Java

- Location in Java and Indonesia Probolinggo (Indonesia)
- Coordinates: 7°45′S 113°13′E
- Country: Indonesia
- Province: East Java
- Settled: 4 September 1359
- Gemeente: 1 July 1918

Government
  - Mayor: Aminuddin
  - Vice Mayor: Ina Dwi Lestari

Area
  - Total: 55.197 km^{2} (21.312 sq mi)
- Elevation: 25 m (82 ft)

Population (mid 2025 estimate)
  - Total: 244,849
  - Rank: 51st
  - Density: 4,435.9/km^{2} (11,489/sq mi)
- Demonyms: Probolinggan
- Time zone: UTC+7 (IWST)
- Postal code: 67211 – 67239
- Area code: (+62) 335
- Vehicle registration: N xxxx Q**/R*/S*
- HDI (2023): ▲0.769 – high
- Website: probolinggokota.go.id

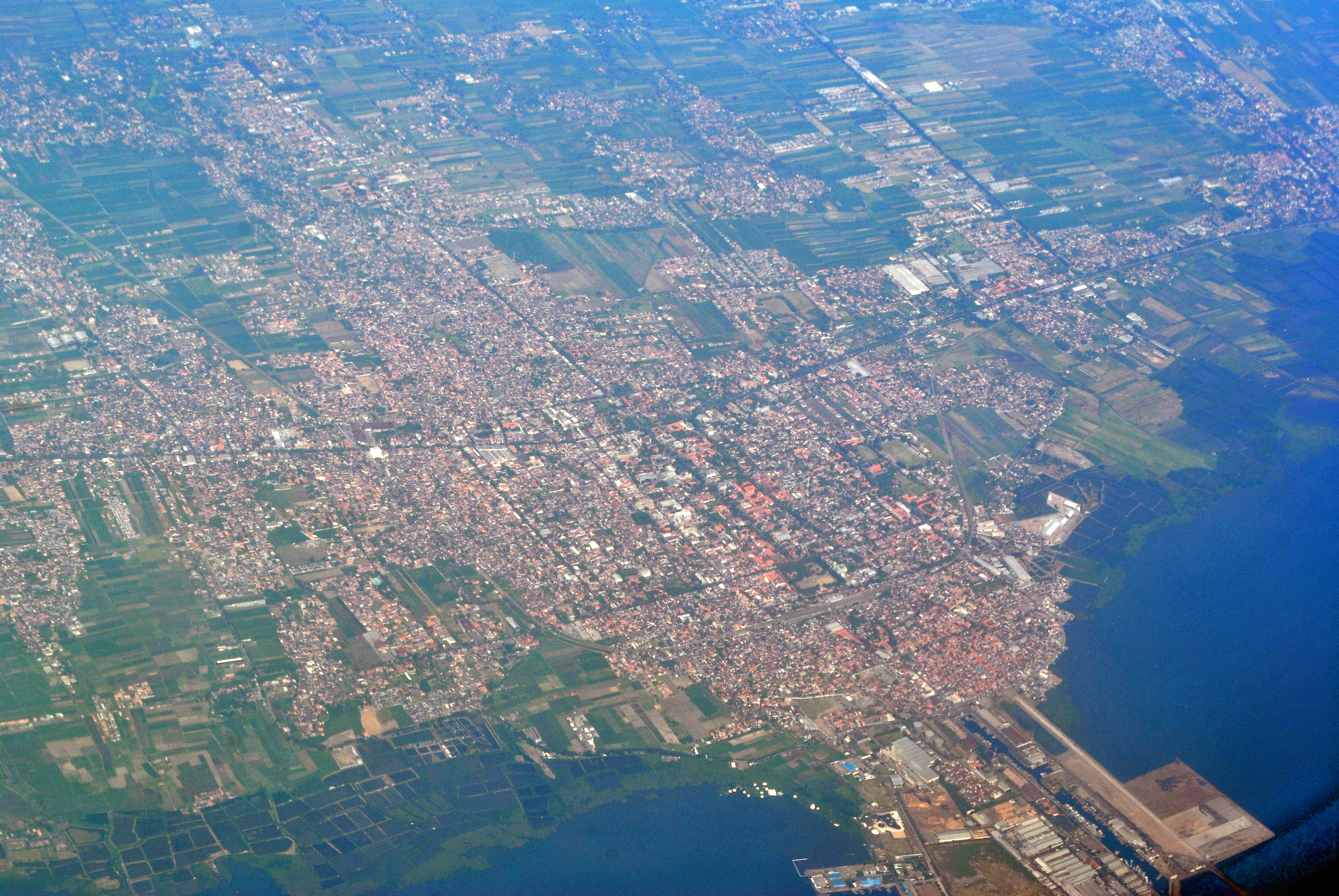
Aerial view of the city as of 2015

Probolinggo (Indonesian: Kota Probolinggo, Madurese: Kottha Prabâlingghâ, Javanese: Kuthå Pråbålinggå) is a city on the north coast of East Java province, Indonesia. It covers an area of 55.197 sq. km, and had a population of 217,062 at the 2010 census and 239,649 at the 2020 census; the official estimate as at mid 2025 was 244,849 (comprising 121,678 males and 123,171 females). It is surrounded on the landward side by Probolinggo Regency of which it was formerly the capital, but it is now a separate administration.

Like most of northern East Java, the city has a large Madurese population in addition to many ethnically Javanese people, other smaller communities includes Chinese and Arabs. It is located on one of the major highways across Java, and has a harbor that is heavily used by fishing vessels.

Under the Dutch East Indies colonial administration, especially in the 19th century, Probolinggo was a lucrative regional center for refining and exporting sugar, and sugar remains an important product of the area.

The city is famous for its mangoes, locally called mangga manalagi. Strong dry-season winds from July to September, the angin gending, help the mango trees pollinate and are sometimes credited with being the source of the area's quality fruit. The city formerly produced grapes as well, but few grapes are grown in the area now.

The motto of the city is Bestari which is an abbreviation of bersih (cleanliness), sehat (healthy), tertib (orderly), aman (safe), rapi (neat), and indah (beautiful).

== Etymology ==
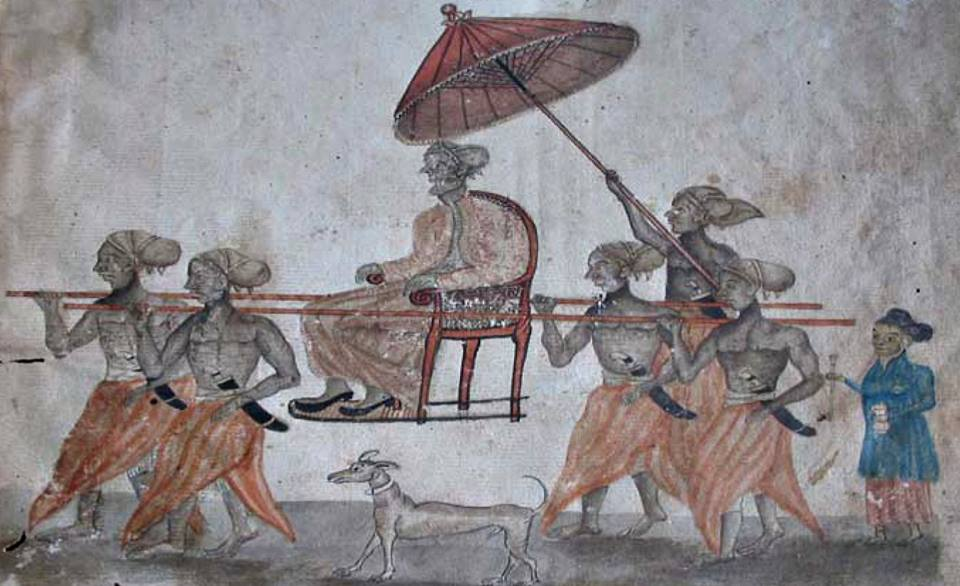
Raden Toemenggoeng Djojonegoro, The second regent of Probolinggo.

In Negarakertagama, the city was called Banger which means bad odor in Javanese. In 1770, Regent Djojonegoro changed the city's name to Probolinggo. The name derives from praba (light) and lingga ([symbol of] masculinity or the Hindu deity lord Shiva). Another version of the etymology is that the name derives from prabu (lord or king) and linggih (stop by).

== History ==
=== Colonial era ===
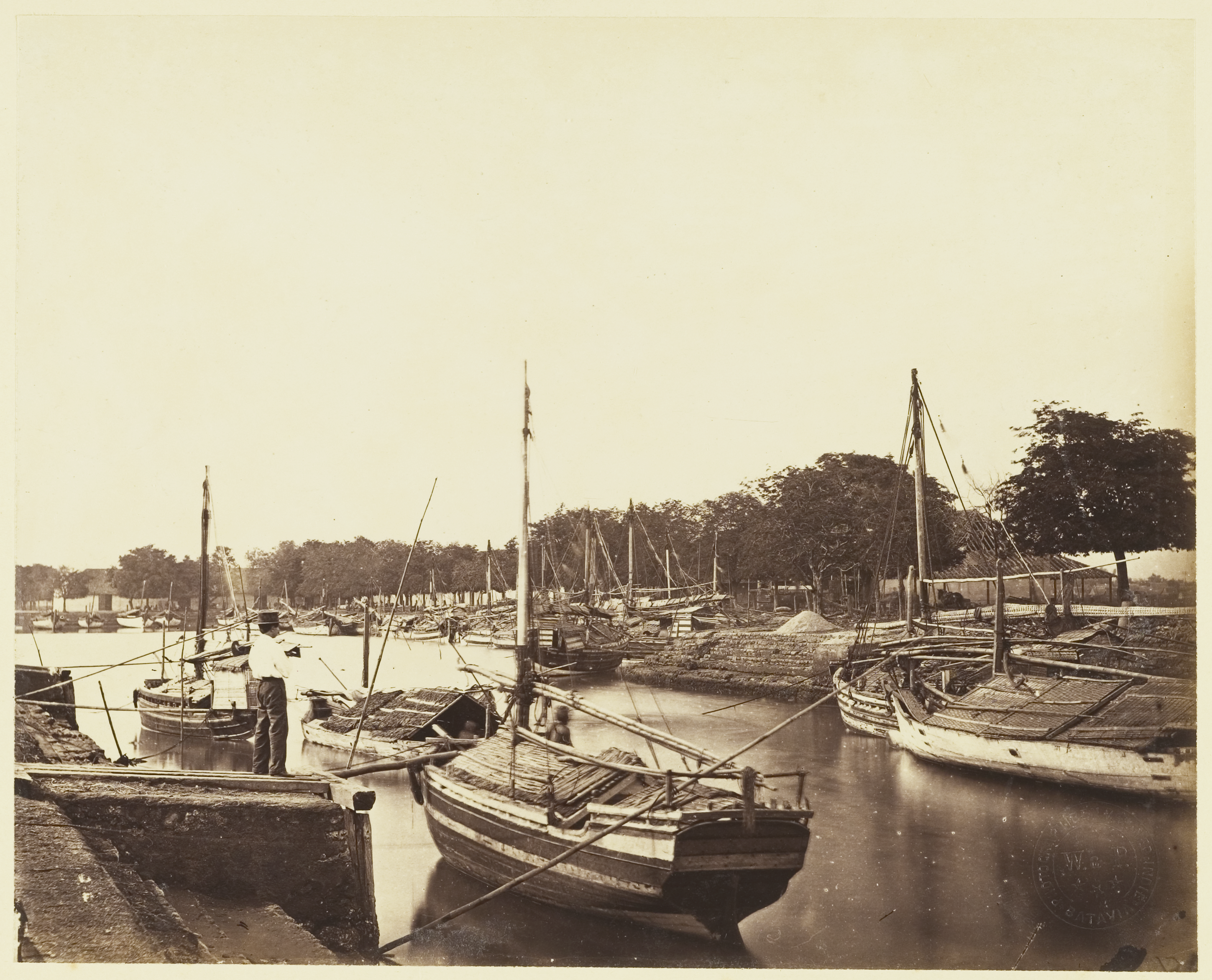
The old port of Probolinggo

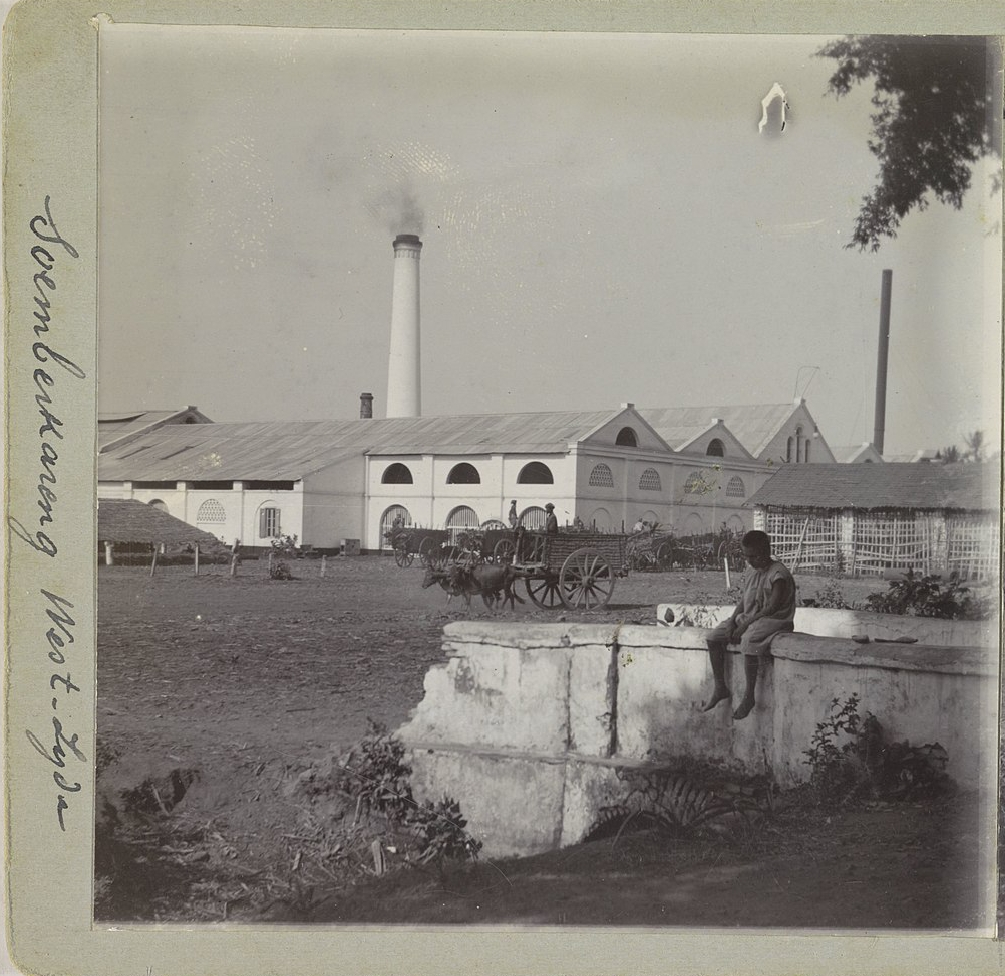
Soemberkareng Sugar Mill in Probolinggo during the colonial era

As a result of Mataram's involvement in Geger Pacinan (and subsequent war), Dutch East India Company signed an agreement with Sunan Pakubuwono II on 11 November 1743 to hand over most of eastern Java, including Probolinggo, to the former. In 1811, under Dutch East Indies' Governor General Daendels rule, Probolinggo was sold to a Chinese man Han Kik Ko. The agreed price was 1 million ringgit paid in installment for 10 years. He then was given titles of "Mayor Cina" (Chinese mayor) and "Tuan Tanah Probolinggo" ("Probolinggo Landlord") that had similar authority as bupati (regent). Meanwhile, Probolinggo resident called him "Babah Tumenggung".

Under Han Tik-Ko, Probolinggo residents were not satisfied with Han Kik Ko since he imposed heavy taxes to them. As a result, on 18 May 1813, a clash happened between the rebellious residents and Han Kik Ko's people. The event was called Perang Kedopok/Kepruk Cino (Kedopok War/Hit the Chinese) in which Han Kik Ko was killed along with a number of British officers. The Dutch East Indies Lieutenant Governor Stamford Raffles then bought back the city from Han Kik Ko's family.

The ruler of Probolinggo between 1818 and 1821 was Raden Tumenggung Aryo Notoadiningrat, while in 1823 the ruler was Raden Tumenggung Panji Notonegoro.

=== Early independence ===
After Japanese surrendered to Allied forces, there was repatriation of Japanese soldiers by Allied force. In Probolinggo, on 29 April 1946 around 1,200 prisoners of war were returned by two ships "Bansiu Maru 3" and "Mashi Maru 6" departed from Probolinggo port.

=== Indonesia National Revolution ===
On 12 April 1947 23:30 3 km from shore near Probolinggo port, a Dutch ship seized and searched a wooden ship called "Boeroehan" and found nothing. The next day at 11:00 the latter ship was released and 5 minutes later the Dutch ship sailed away and disappeared to the northwest. On 13 April at 08:45 another Dutch ship went back and forth 5 km from the shore and sailed to the east.

On 23 May 1947, there were 3 Dutch ships spying on Probolinggo. At 06:15 one of these searched and seized the ship "Merdeka" departing for Tangklok, Sampang, when the Madura resident boarded it. The ship was later released at 07:45. Another ship named "Kembangsari" and several other fishing boats were also either searched for or chased away.

Dewan Pertahanan Daerah Probolinggo (Probolinggo Regional Defense Council) then strengthened the naval defense of the area to face more Dutch ships attacking by sea. As a result, the Dutch later entered the city by land.

== Government ==
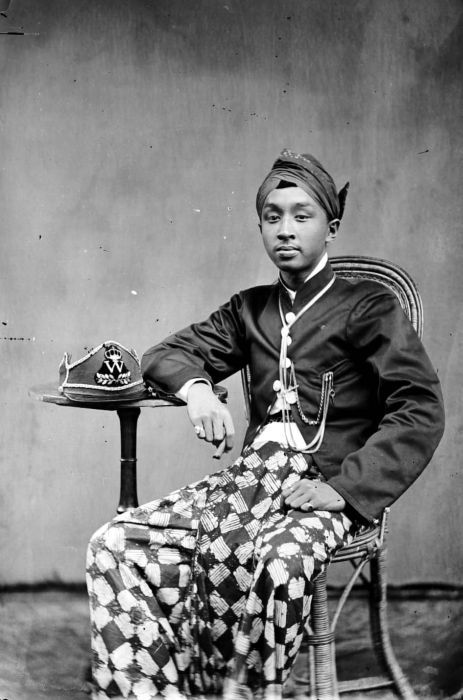
Natives government officer Probolinggo (1913)

Administration of Probolinggo city (kota) and regency (kabupaten) had repeatedly been separated and merged. There were separation of government of Probolinggo city (kotapraja) and regency based on Ordonantie dated 20 June 1918. But, according on Ordonantie 9 August 1928, the city was abolished and the area was merged again to the regency.

Under Japanese occupation, the administrations were once again separated. The city (under Japanese rule, the level was called shi) mayor (shico) was Gapar Wiryosudibyo, a middle school teacher, while the regency (ken) regent was Nyais Wiryosubroto. Both Probolinggo (shi and ken) were under an administration of Malang-shu (residency).

During National Revolution, on 13 August 1948 the city was abolished again and was absorbed into the regency. Then since the Dutch recognition of Indonesian independence, the city and regency were separated again.

== Administrative districts ==
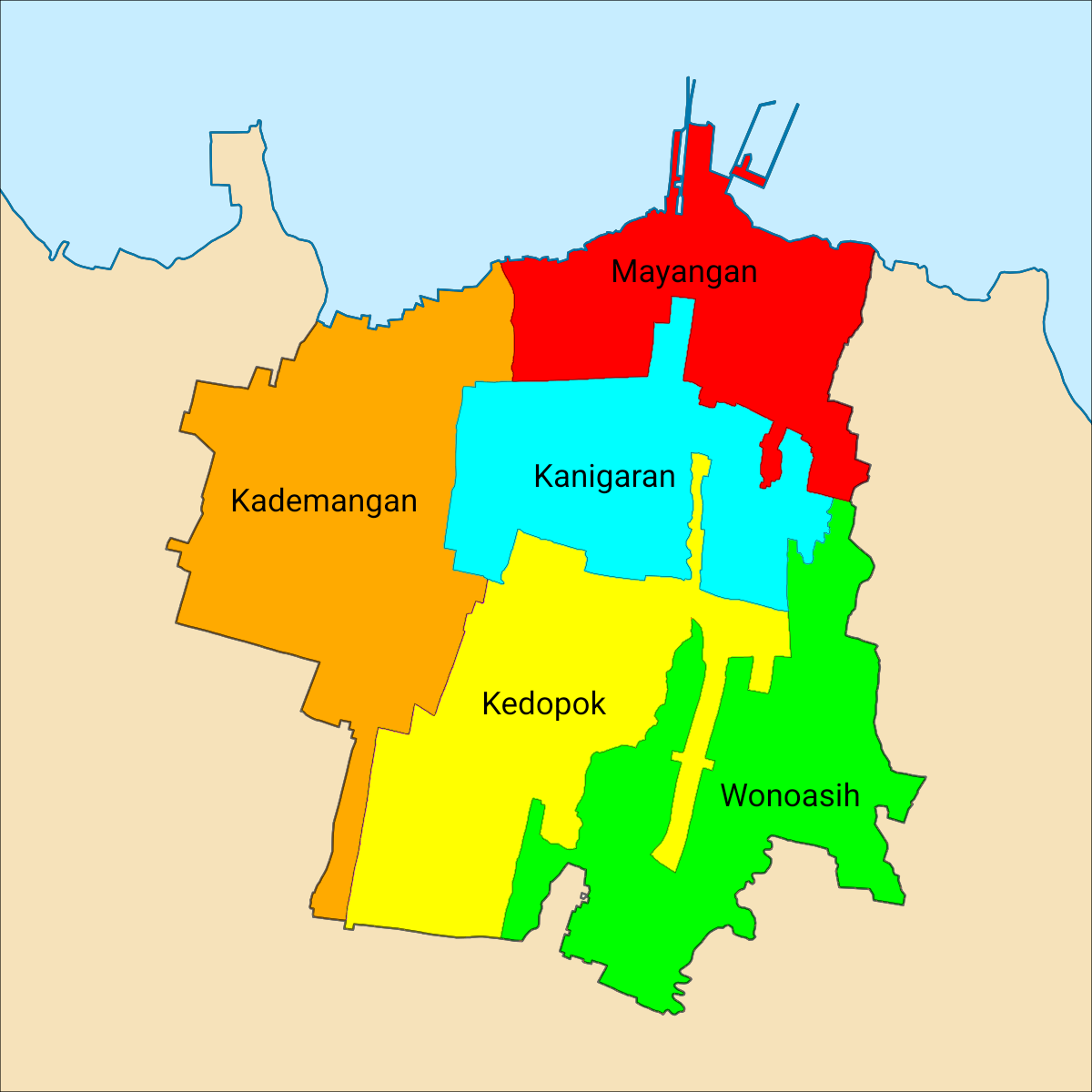
The map of districts in Probolinggo City

Probolinggo city consists of five districts (kecamatan), tabulated below with their areas and their population totals from the 2010 census and the 2020 census, together with the official estimates as at mid 2025. The table also includes the number of administrative villages (all classed as urban kelurahan) in each district and its postal codes. Each district centre has the same name as the district itself.

Kode Wilayah	Name of District (kecamatan)	Area in km^{2}	Pop'n census 2010	Pop'n census 2020	Pop'n estimate mid 2025	No. of villages	Post codes
35.74.01	Kademangan	12.75	39,920	44,623	44,840	6	67221 - 67226
35.74.05	Kedopok	13.62	30,404	37,815	39,560	6	67227 - 67239
35.74.02	Wonoasih	10.98	31,688	35,213	35,840	6	67232 - 67239
35.74.03	Mayangan	8.66	60,446	61,768	61,340	5	67216 - 67219
35.74.04	Kanigaran	10.65	54,604	60,230	63,270	6	67221 - 67225
	Totals	56.67	217,062	239,649	244,849	29	

== Transportation ==
Probolinggo once had a tram system spanning across the city. The service was built in 1894 and was operated by Probolinggo Stoomtram Maatschappij.

Probolinggo is a hub city where its main road connect three major city in East java, Surabaya to the west (through Pasuruan and Sidoarjo), Jember to the south through Lumajang, and Banyuwangi to the east through Situbondo. Public buses to many major cities are available in Banyuangga bus terminal.

Since 2019, the Trans-java toll road has been completed and provide faster route to the capital Jakarta, which cuts down travel time significantly to only 9 to 10 hour drive from previously 16 to 20 hours.

=== Bus ===
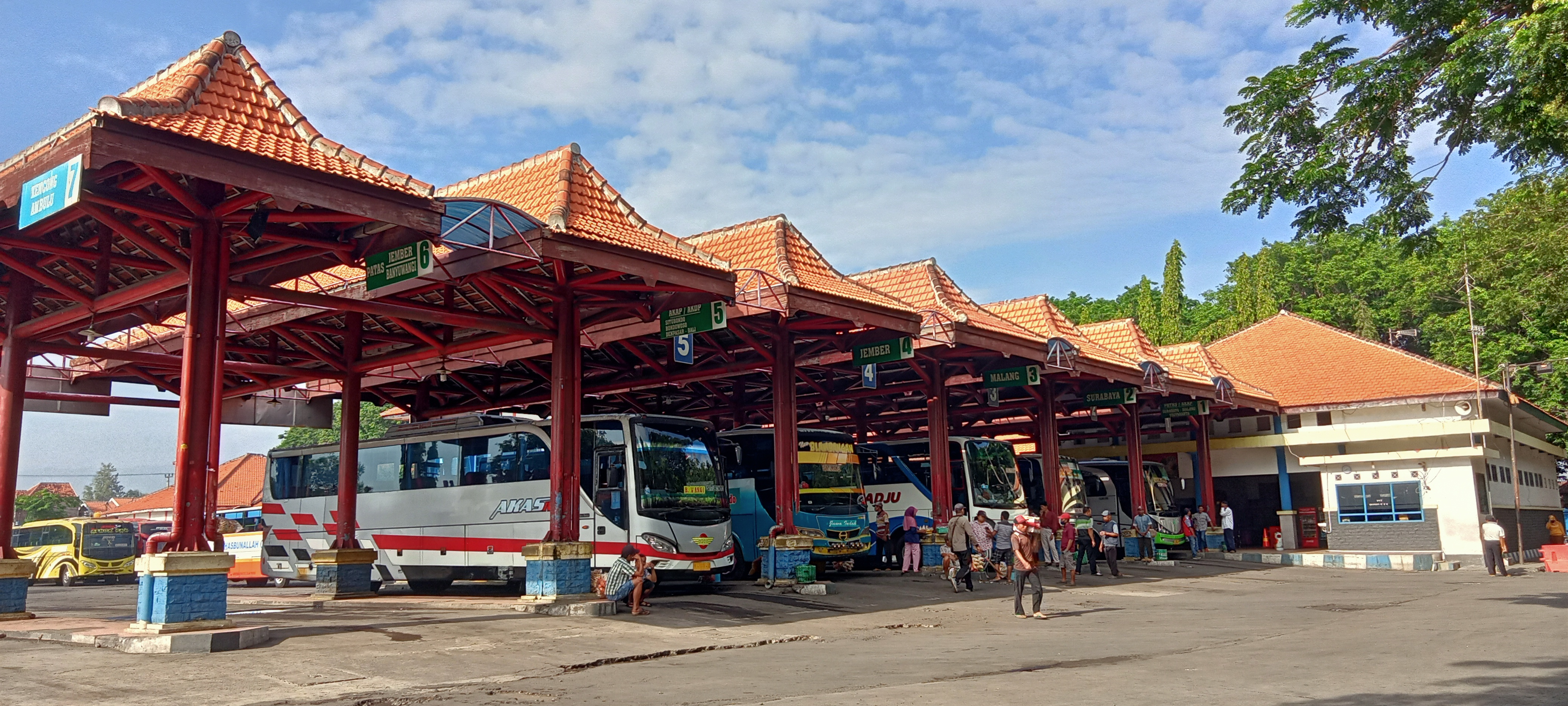
Bayuangga bus station in Probolinggo City

The city (and the regency) is served by Bayuangga bus station that covers routes to Surabaya, Malang, and Jember.

=== Railway ===
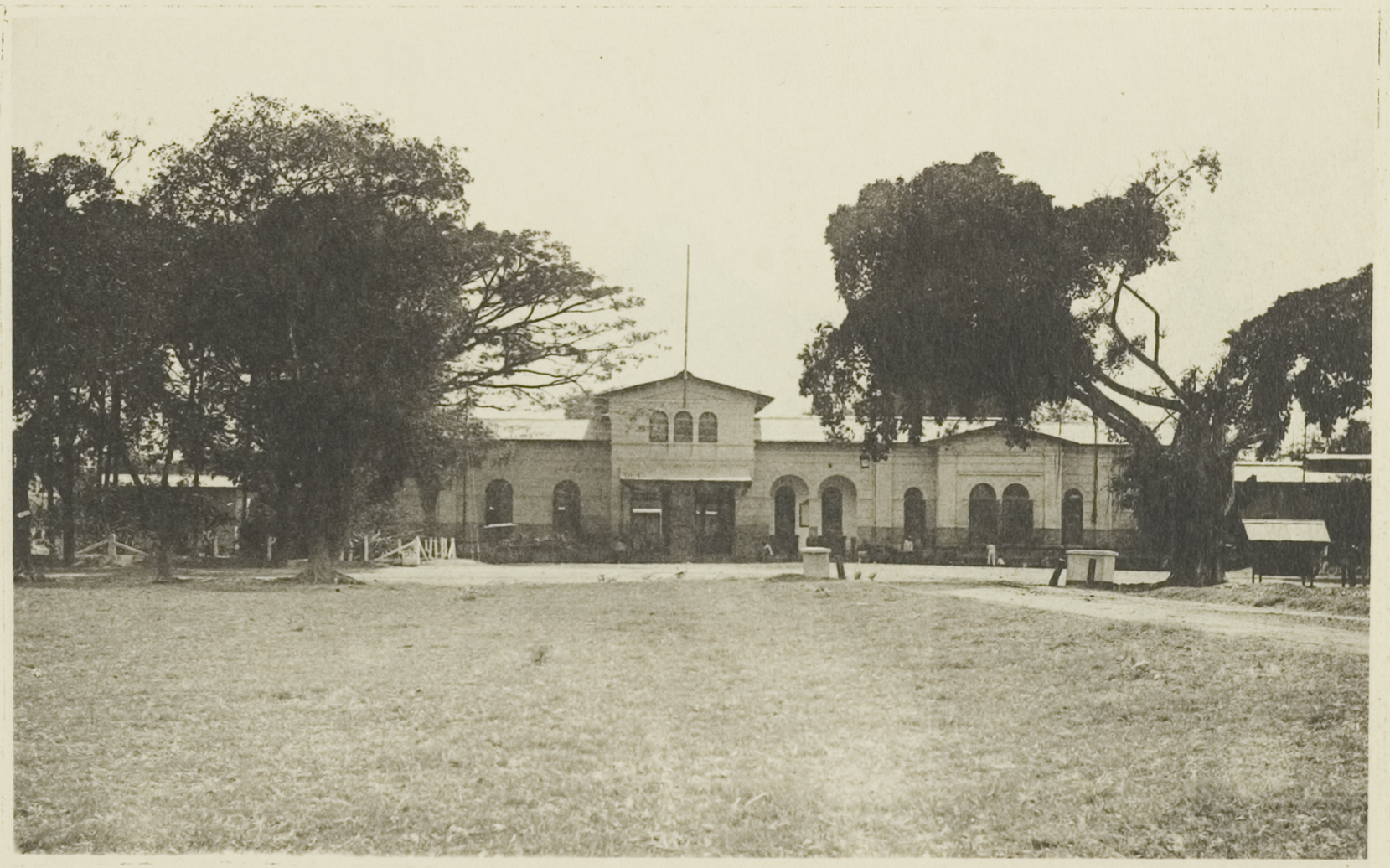
The railway station of Probolinggo during the colonial era

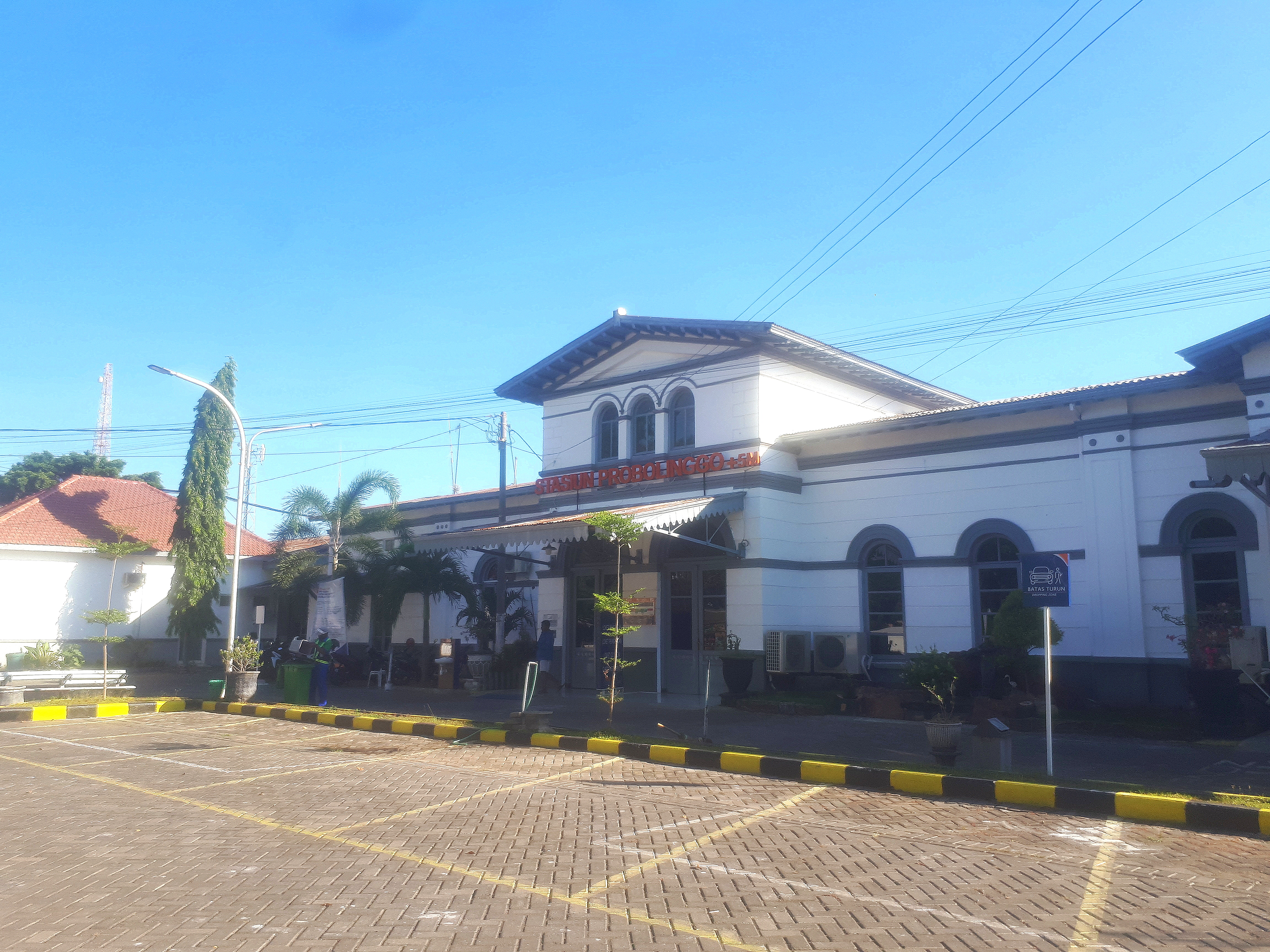
The railway station of Probolinggo now

The city is served by Probolinggo railway station that covers most routes to major cities in Java, including the capital Jakarta.

=== Air ===
There is no air route to the city. The closest airport is the Juanda International Airport in Surabaya, which is a less than 2 hour drive through the newly completed toll road.

== Climate ==
Probolinggo has a tropical savanna climate (Köppen Aw) with heavy rainfall from December to March and moderate to little rainfall from April to November.

Climate data for Probolinggo
Month	Jan	Feb	Mar	Apr	May	Jun	Jul	Aug	Sep	Oct	Nov	Dec	Year
Mean daily maximum °C (°F)	32.2 (90.0)	32.0 (89.6)	32.0 (89.6)	32.0 (89.6)	31.8 (89.2)	31.8 (89.2)	31.7 (89.1)	32.3 (90.1)	33.1 (91.6)	33.6 (92.5)	33.4 (92.1)	32.5 (90.5)	32.4 (90.3)
Daily mean °C (°F)	27.2 (81.0)	27.1 (80.8)	27.0 (80.6)	26.8 (80.2)	26.3 (79.3)	25.7 (78.3)	25.1 (77.2)	25.6 (78.1)	26.4 (79.5)	27.1 (80.8)	27.6 (81.7)	27.2 (81.0)	26.6 (79.9)
Mean daily minimum °C (°F)	22.2 (72.0)	22.2 (72.0)	22.0 (71.6)	21.7 (71.1)	20.9 (69.6)	19.7 (67.5)	18.6 (65.5)	19.0 (66.2)	19.7 (67.5)	20.7 (69.3)	21.8 (71.2)	21.9 (71.4)	20.9 (69.6)
Average rainfall mm (inches)	242 (9.5)	240 (9.4)	198 (7.8)	109 (4.3)	80 (3.1)	45 (1.8)	19 (0.7)	7 (0.3)	7 (0.3)	18 (0.7)	75 (3.0)	168 (6.6)	1,208 (47.5)
Source: Climate-Data.org

== Demography ==
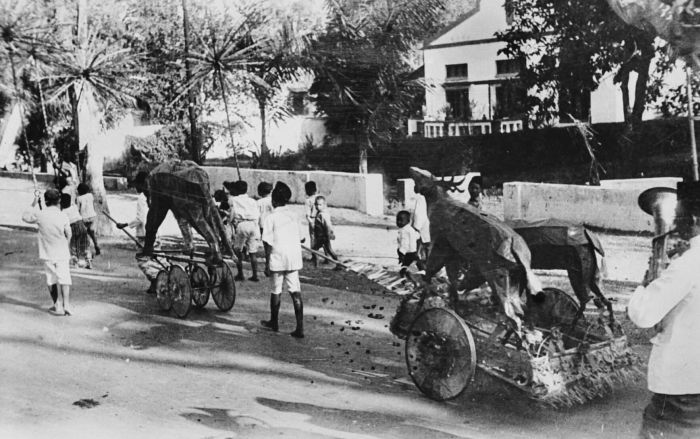
Traditional wedding parade in Probolinggo during the conial era

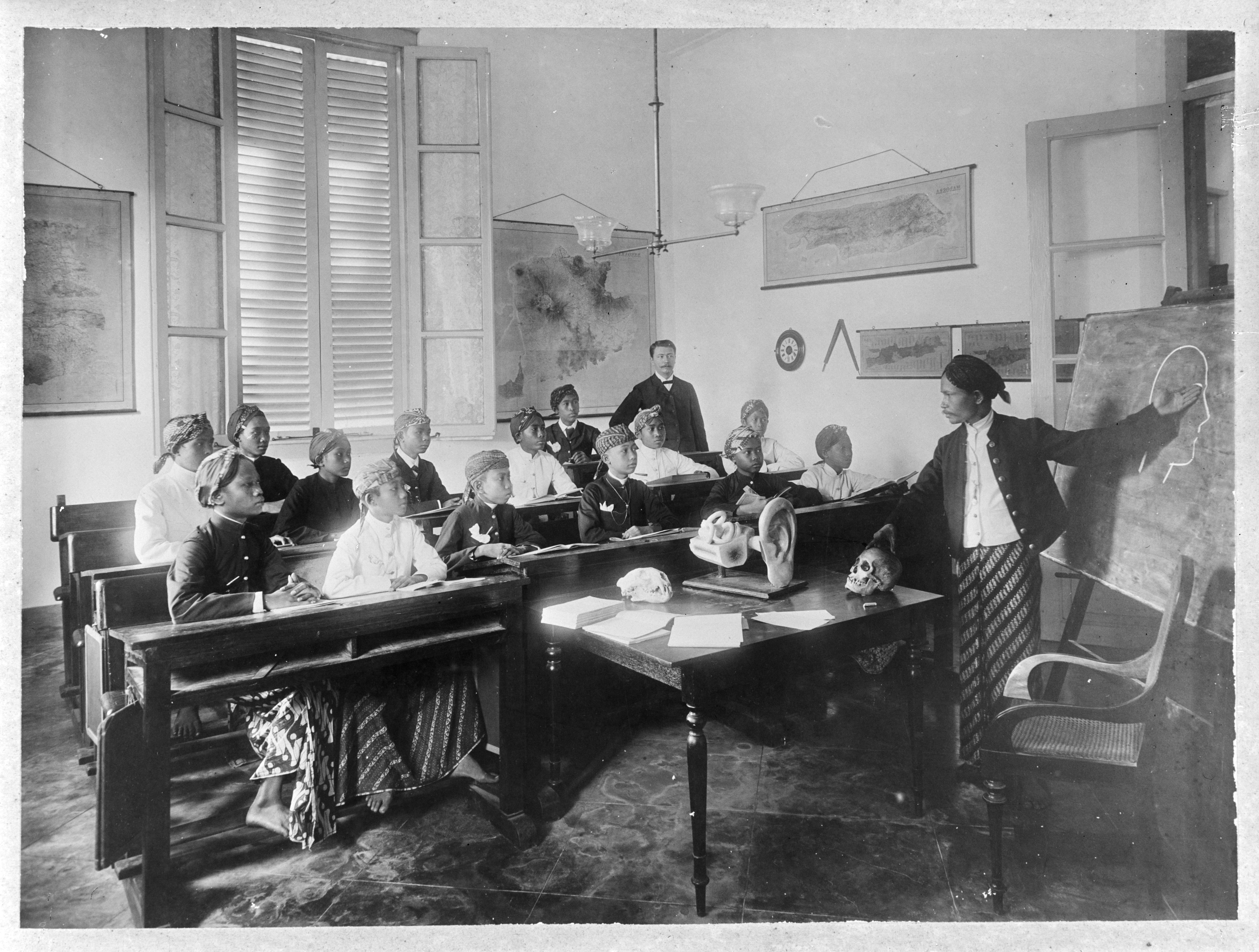
A classroom in one of the schools in Probolinggo during the colonial era

In a 1845 census, there were 18,458 Javanese and 56,317 Madurese in Probolinggo. In a more complete census in 1930, in Probolinggo there were 85,257 bumiputera (mostly Madurese and Javanese), 3,179 Chinese, 483 other Far eastern ethnics, and 952 Europeans.

== Bibliography ==
- Sapto, Ari (2020). Gerilya Republik di Kota Probolinggo 1947-1949 [Republic's Guerrilla in Probolinggo City 1947-1949]. Matapadi. ISBN 978-602-1634-42-4.
