= Han Siong Kong =

- Born: 1673; Tianbao, Zhangzhou, Fujian, Qing dynasty
- Died: 1743; Rajegwesi (now Bojonegoro), Java, VOC in East Indies
- Years active: Early 18th century
- Known for: Founder of the Han family of Lasem
- Children: Ngabehi Soero Pernollo; Han Bwee Kong, Kapitein der Chinezen
- Family: Adipati Soero Adinegoro (grandson) Raden Soero Adiwikromo (grandson); Han Chan Piet, Majoor der Chinezen (grandson) Han Kik Ko, Majoor der Chinezen (grandson)

Han Siong Kong (Chinese: 韓松公; Pe̍h-ōe-jī: Hân Siông-kong; 1673–1743) is best known as the founder of the Han family of Lasem, one of the oldest dynasties of the Cabang Atas or the Chinese gentry (baba bangsawan) of colonial Indonesia. As government bureaucrats, landlords and politicians, his descendants played an important role in the colonial history of Indonesia.

== History ==
He was born in Tianbao of Zhangzhou, in Fujian province of Qing dynasty. Han was from a long line of scholar-officials. His first attested ancestor is Han Zhaode, a general in the army of the warlord Tan Goan-kong (died 711), who pacified Fujian for the Tang dynasty (618–907). Han Siong Kong's branch of the family is descended from Han Hong, who received the degree of Metropolitan Graduate in the Imperial examination of 1121, then received an appointment as Secretary in the Ministry of Inland Revenue during the Song dynasty (960–1279).

Around 1700, Han Siong Kong left his native country for Lasem, a port on the north coast of Java island. By an unnamed woman of at least part-native ancestry, Han had five sons and four daughters. According to J. Hageman, Han's wife was the daughter of the regent of Rajegwesi (now part of Bojonegoro regency). Two of their sons, Ngabehi Soero Pernollo and Han Bwee Kong, Kapitein der Chinezen, would play a significant role in establishing and consolidating Dutch colonial rule in East Java.

=== Death ===
Han Siong Kong died in 1743 in Rajegwesi, Central Java. Local legend has it that in the course of Han's funeral ceremony, there was a thunderstorm. As a result, Han's children abandoned their father's coffin in the forest in order to seek shelter. The displeased spirit of Han Siong Kong is said to have cast down a curse on his descendants who dared settle down in Lasem.

== See also ==
- Han family of Lasem
- People from the Dutch East Indies
