= Descent from antiquity =

Claims of ancient ancestry

In European genealogy, a descent from antiquity (DFA or DfA) is a proven unbroken line of descent between specific individuals from ancient history and people living today. The ancestry of many living individuals can readily be traced back to the Early Middle Ages, but beyond that, all claimed lines to late classical antiquity have been shown to be speculative at best. Despite many ongoing efforts, no well-researched, historically-documented generation-by-generation genealogical descents from classical antiquity to modern persons of European or West Asian descent are generally accepted in Western genealogical scholarship.

== Past claims ==
The idea of descent from antiquity is by no means new to genealogy. Hellenistic dynasties, such as the Ptolemies, claimed ancestry from deities and mythical figures. In the Middle Ages, major royal dynasties of Europe sponsored compilations claiming their descent from Julius Caesar, Alexander the Great, and in particular the legendary heroes of Troy (see also Euhemerism). Such claims were intended as propaganda to glorify a royal patron's ancient and noble ancestry. These lines of descent included not only mythical figures but also outright invention, much of which is still in wide circulation today.

== Current efforts ==
The distinguishing feature of a descent from antiquity compared to a traditional pedigree is the intent to establish a historically verifiable generation-by-generation descent, unlike the legendary descents found in medieval genealogical sources and modern pseudogenealogy in books like The Holy Blood and the Holy Grail and The Da Vinci Code. DFA research has focused on the ancestries of royal and noble families, especially the possible genealogical links between the new dynasties of western Europe from which well-documented descents are known, such as the Carolingians, Robertians, Cerdicings, and the Astur-Leonese dynasty, back through the ruling families of the post-Roman Germanic dynasties and Franco-Romans, all the way to the gentility of the Roman Empire, or in the Eastern Mediterranean linking the royal Armenian wives of some Byzantine emperors through the ruling families of the Caucasus to the rulers of the Hellenistic, Parthian, and Roman-client kingdoms of the Middle East.

The phrase descent from antiquity was used by Tobias Smollett in the 18th-century newspaper The Critical Review. Reviewing William Betham's Genealogical Tables of the Sovereigns of the World, from the earliest to the present period, he wrote "From a barren list of names we learn who were the fathers or mothers, or more distant progenitors, of the select few, who are able to trace what is called their descent from antiquity." The possibility of establishing a DFA as a result of serious genealogical research was raised in a pair of influential essays, by Iain Moncreiffe and Anthony Wagner. Wagner explored the reasons why it was difficult to do and suggested several possible methods. The following years have seen a number of studies of possible methods by which an appropriately documented ancestry might be found. These methods typically involve either linkages among the ruling dynasties of the post-Roman Empire Germanic states, or those between the ancient dynasties of the Caucasus and the rulers of the Byzantine Empire. Though based largely on historical documentation, these proposed methods have invariably resorted to speculation based on known political relationships and onomastics; for example, the tendency of families to name children in honor of relatives is used as evidence for hypothesized relationships between people bearing the same name. Proposed DFAs vary greatly both in the quality of their research and the degree to which speculation plays a role in their proposed connections.

No European DFA is accepted as established. The outlines of several possible ancestries that could become DFAs have been proposed, but they each lack crucial evidence. Nonetheless, the pursuit of DFAs has stimulated detailed inquiry into the prosopography of ancient and early medieval societies.

== See also ==
- Family tree of Confucius in the main line of descent
- Imperial House of Japan
- Kohen – the ancient Jewish priesthood upon whom some make claims of direct patrilineal descent
