= Ronggo =

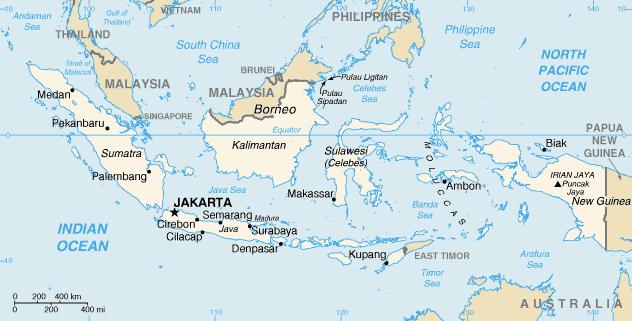
The title Ronggo was used in Java and Borneo within the Indonesian Island Chain- pictured above.

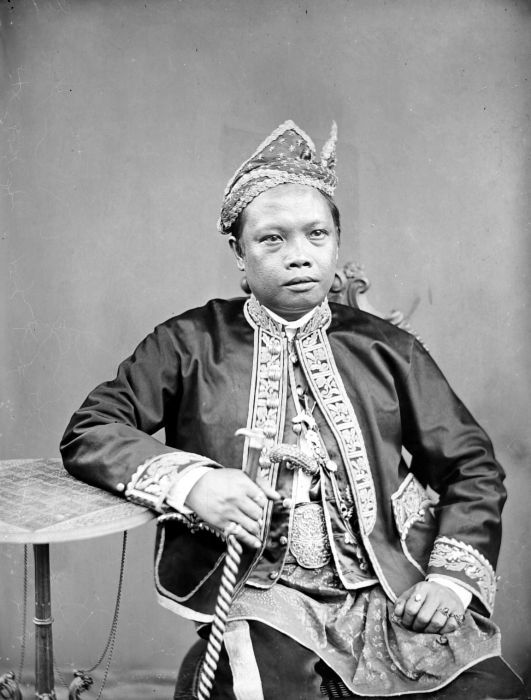

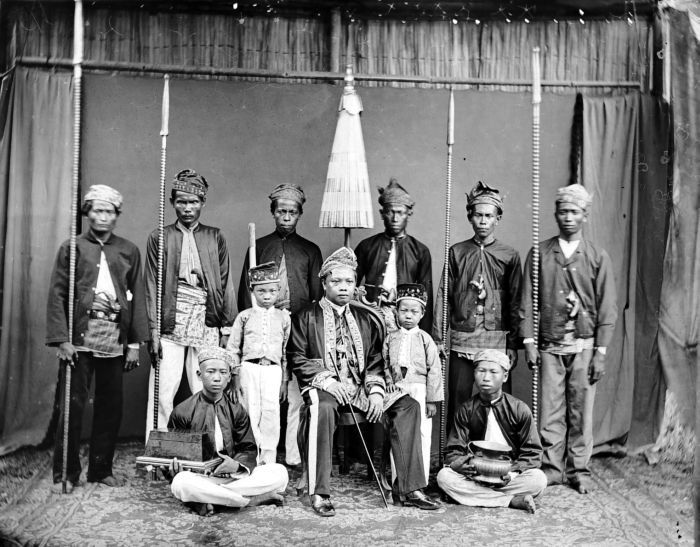
Ronggo of Banjarmasin with his children

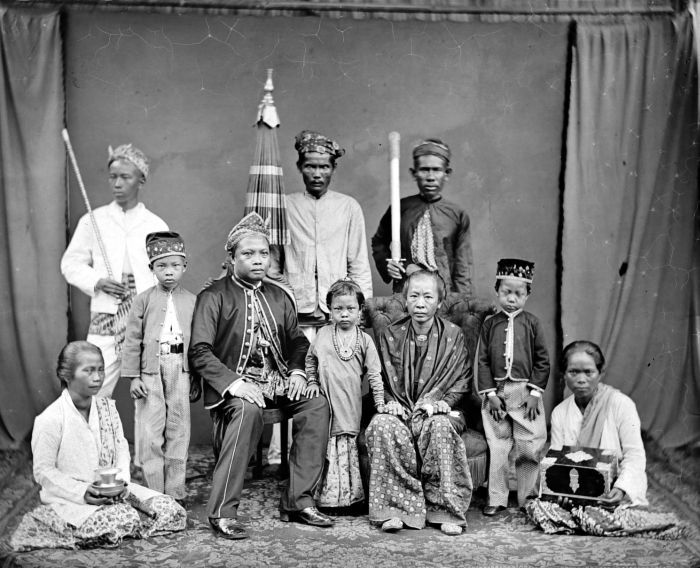
Ronggo of Banjarmasin Raden Tumenggung Suria Kasuma with his wife and children

Ronggo was an administrative title used by the Dutch in the Dutch East Indies in Indonesia (specifically Java and Borneo.)

== History ==
Ronggo of "Afdeeling" Bandjarmasin was held by Kiahi Mas Djaja Samoedra (circa 1899) (EYD or "advanced spelling": Kiai Mas Jaya Samudera). The region saw much international trade with Asia and the Middle East. After a period of warfare dominated much of the late 1500s to mid 1600s, Portugal controlled the area for a short time.

Following Portuguese control, the Dutch East India Company awarded a monopoly on trade and colonization in the area utilizing an exceptional financial backing, better organization, strategy, weapons and ships, but were still unable to completely dominate the Indonesian spice trade. In the 1800s, the Dutch East India Company dissolved due to bankruptcy and the Netherlands turned it into a nationalized colony.

Bandjarmasi leadership structure:

- Assistant Resident: E.B. Masthoff
- Police chief: C.W.H. Born
- Ronggo: Kiahi Mas Djaja Samoedra
- Chinese Lieutenants: Sin Yoe and Ang Lim Thay
- Captain of Arabs: Hasan bin Said Al Habesi Idroes

== Sequence of leadership titles ==
- Regent (abolished in 1884)
- Temonggong
- Ronggo (abolished 1905)
- Kiai and Demang
