= Besuki =

District in Situbondo Regency, East Java, Indonesia

Coordinates: 7.75448°S 113.7023°E

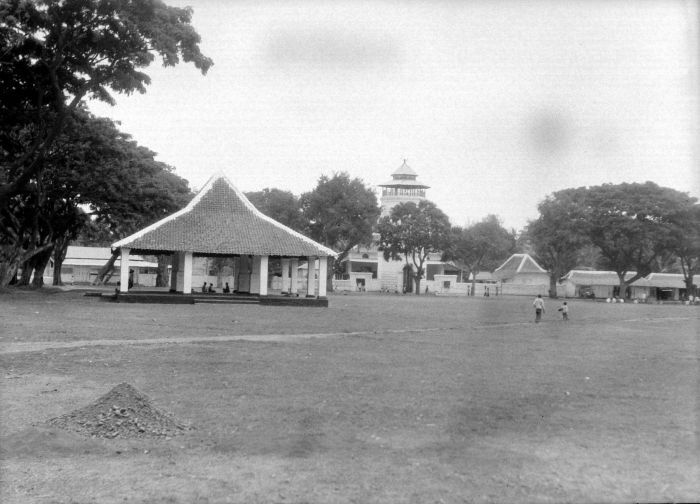
Town Square and a mosque in Besuki in 1929

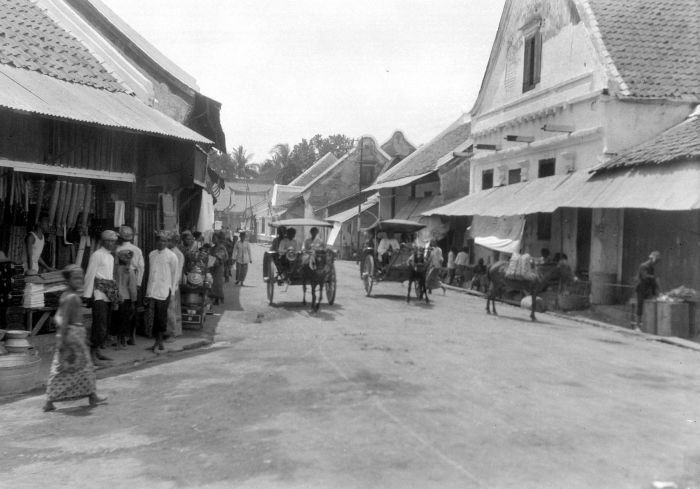
Street View of Besuki in 1929

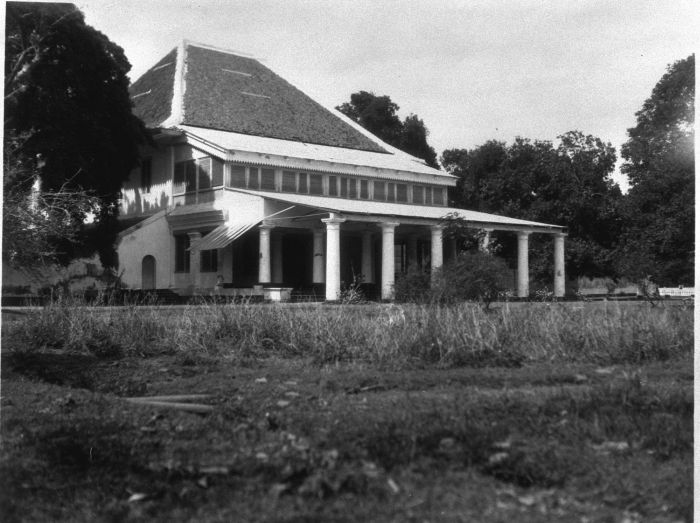
The old residence of Resident of Besuki before moved to Bondowoso (ca. 1927–1929)

Besuki is a district (kecamatan) in Situbondo Regency, East Java, Indonesia with an area of 26.08 km^{2}. In 2004, its population was 57,109 people. In ancient time the city was important because it was the capital of the Residency of Besuki.

During the Majapahit Kingdom, Besuki was already a growing area and was known by the name Keta. The town revolted along with Sadeng against the Majapahit Empire but was extinguished by Gajah Mada. This event occurred in the year 1331 CE.

== Villages ==
1. Kalimas
2. Widoropayung
3. Bloro
4. Besuki
5. Demung
6. Jetis
7. Langkap
8. Pesisir
9. Blimbing
10. Sumberejo
