= Situbondo Regency =

Regency in East Java, Indonesia

Situbondo Regency Kabupaten Situbondo
- Regency

Regional transcription(s)
  - Madurese: Situbânḍâ (Latèn) سيتوبۤانڊۤا (Pèghu) ꦯꦶꦠꦸꦨꦤ꧀ꦝ (Carakan)
  - Javanese: Situbåndhå (Gêdrig) سيتوبانڎا (Pégon) ꦱꦶꦠꦸꦧꦤ꧀ꦝ (Hånåcåråkå)
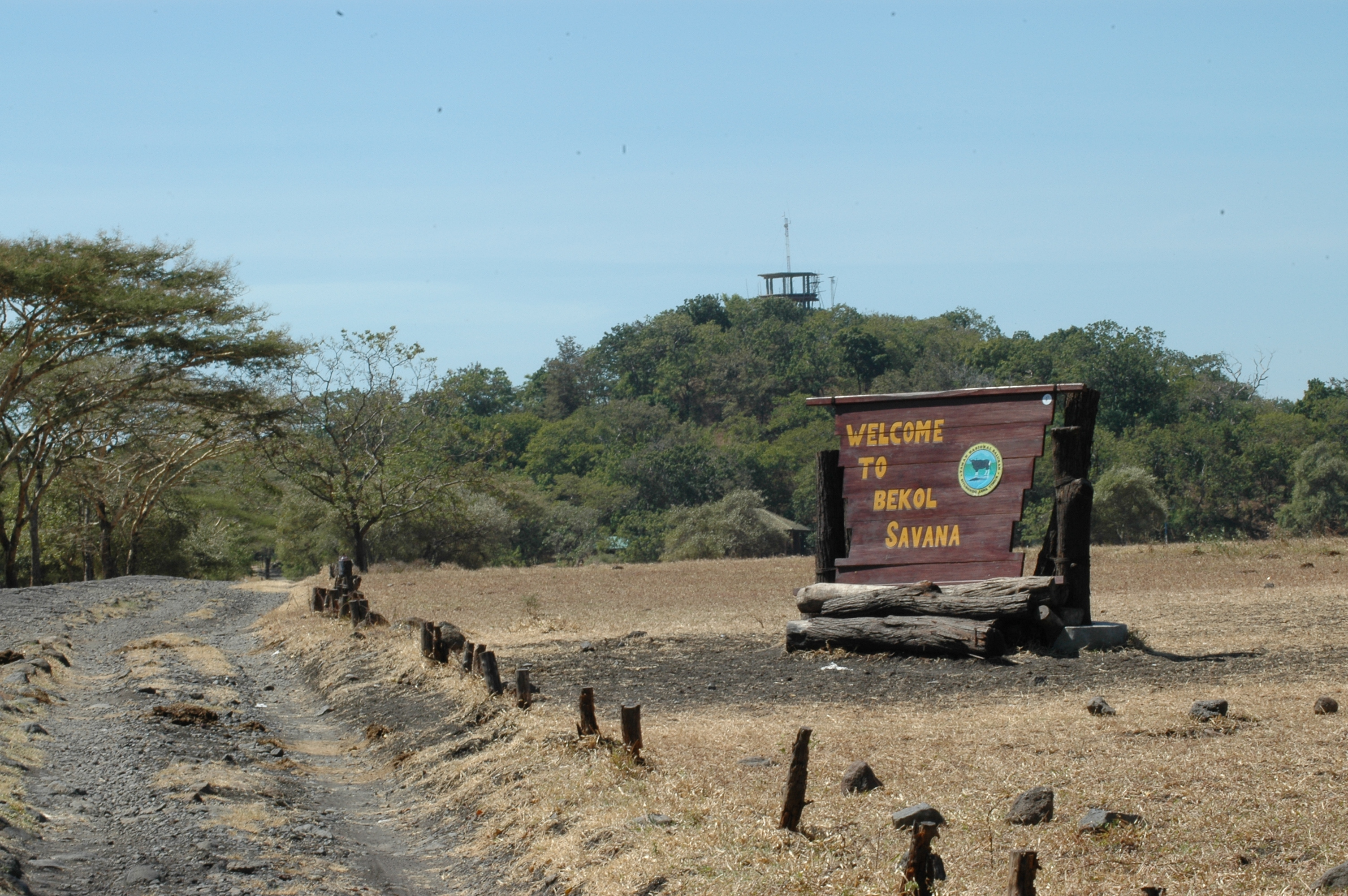
- Savannah Bekol

- Coat of arms

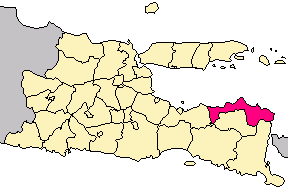
- Location within East Java

- Location in Java and Indonesia Situbondo Regency (Indonesia)
- Coordinates: 7°42′S 114°00′E
- Country: Indonesia
- Province: East Java
- Capital: Situbondo
- Anniversary: 15 August 1818

Government
  - Regent: Yusuf Rio Wahyu Prayogo
  - Vice Regent: Ulfiyah

Area
  - Total: 1,655.05 km^{2} (639.02 sq mi)

Population (mid 2025 estimate)
  - Total: 698,375
  - Density: 421.966/km^{2} (1,092.89/sq mi)
- Time zone: UTC+7 (IWST)
- Area code: (+62) 338
- Website: situbondokab.go.id

Situbondo Regency (Madurese: Kabhupatèn Situbânḍâ) is a regency (kabupaten) in the east of East Java province, Indonesia. It covers an area of 1,655.05 km^{2}, and had a population of 647,619 at the 2010 Census and 685,967 at the 2020 Census; the official estimate as at mid 2025 was 698,375 (comprising 338,331 males and 353,304 females). It is located towards the eastern end of Java, before Banyuwangi. Its administrative centre is Situbondo, a small town within the regency. One of its famous tourist sites is Baluran National Park.

== Administrative districts ==
The Regency is divided into seventeen districts (kecamatan), tabulated below with their areas and their population totals from the 2010 Census and the 2020 Census, together with the official estimates as at mid 2025. The table also includes the locations of the district headquarters and the number of administrative villages in each district (totaling 132 rural villages, and 4 urban kelurahan), and its post codes.

Area Code	Name of District (kecamatan)	Area in km^{2}	Pop'n Census 2010	Pop'n Census 2020	Pop'n Estimate mid 2025	Admin centre	No. of villages	Post codes
35.12.15	Sumbermalang	89.65	26,319	28,466	29,164	Tlogosari	9	68355
35.12.01	Jatibanteng	103.93	21,847	23,083	23,513	Jatibanteng	8	68357
35.12.16	Banyuglugur	67.04	22,443	24,583	24,545	Banyuglugur	7	68359
35.12.02	Besuki	27.73	61,211	65,110	66,982	Besuki	10	68356
35.12.03	Suboh	30.85	26,186	28,178	29,223	Buduan	8	68354
35.12.04	Mlandingan	54.85	22,371	23,809	24,952	Mlandingan Kulon	7	68353
35.12.17	Bungatan	68.10	24,417	25,982	26,529	Bungatan	7	68358
35.12.05	Kendit	111.81	28,172	29,310	30,475	Kendit	7	68352
35.12.06	Panarukan	60.05	53,034	58,315	60,032	Wringin Anom	8	68351
35.12.07	Situbondo	28.84	46,854	48,656	49,641	Patokan	6 ^{(a)}	68311: 68316
35.12.09	Mangaran	37.01	31,937	34,181	35,871	Mangaran	6	68363
35.12.08	Panji	46.46	68,286	66,926	67,983	Mimbaan	12 ^{(b)}	68321: 68323
35.12.10	Kapongan	51.61	36,990	38,939	40,715	Kesambi Rampak	10	68362
35.12.11	Arjasa	184.82	39,708	43,637	44,345	Arjasa	8	68371
35.12.12	Jangkar	75.53	36,321	41,012	41,258	Jangkar	8	68372
35.12.13	Asembagus	225.76	47,256	49,661	50,384	Asembagus	10	68373
35.12.14	Banyuputih ^{(c)}	391.01	54,267	56,119	52,763	Sumberanyar	5	68374
	Totals	1,655.05	647,619	685,967	698,375	Situbondo	136	

Note: (a) including 2 kelurahan - Dawuhan and Patokan. (b) including 2 kelurahan - Ardirejo and Mimbaan. (c) including the offshore island of Pulau Karangmas.

== Climate ==
Situbondo has a tropical savanna climate (Aw) with heavy rainfall from December to March and moderate to little rainfall from April to November.

Climate data for Situbondo
Month	Jan	Feb	Mar	Apr	May	Jun	Jul	Aug	Sep	Oct	Nov	Dec	Year
Mean daily maximum °C (°F)	31.1 (88.0)	31.1 (88.0)	31.3 (88.3)	31.7 (89.1)	31.7 (89.1)	31.6 (88.9)	31.5 (88.7)	31.9 (89.4)	33.0 (91.4)	33.6 (92.5)	33.2 (91.8)	31.9 (89.4)	32.0 (89.6)
Daily mean °C (°F)	26.0 (78.8)	26.0 (78.8)	26.1 (79.0)	26.4 (79.5)	26.3 (79.3)	25.9 (78.6)	25.4 (77.7)	25.8 (78.4)	26.6 (79.9)	27.2 (81.0)	27.2 (81.0)	26.5 (79.7)	26.3 (79.3)
Mean daily minimum °C (°F)	20.9 (69.6)	21.0 (69.8)	21.0 (69.8)	21.2 (70.2)	20.9 (69.6)	20.2 (68.4)	19.3 (66.7)	19.7 (67.5)	20.2 (68.4)	20.8 (69.4)	21.2 (70.2)	21.1 (70.0)	20.6 (69.1)
Average rainfall mm (inches)	281 (11.1)	243 (9.6)	193 (7.6)	77 (3.0)	64 (2.5)	35 (1.4)	20 (0.8)	6 (0.2)	4 (0.2)	18 (0.7)	67 (2.6)	187 (7.4)	1,195 (47.1)
Source: Climate-Data.org

== Demographics ==
=== Languages ===
Situbondo Madurese is a Madurese dialect spoken mainly in Situbondo Regency, in the eastern salient of Java. This dialect is especially closely related or very close to the Sumenep dialect spoken on the easternmost island of Madura. Situbondo, where this language is spoken, although separated from the island of Madura, most or almost all of its population are Madurese, mainly migrating from Sumenep. Madurese people really dominates all the places there, this can be seen from the fact that in all the districts there the dominant language is Madurese.

== Gallery ==
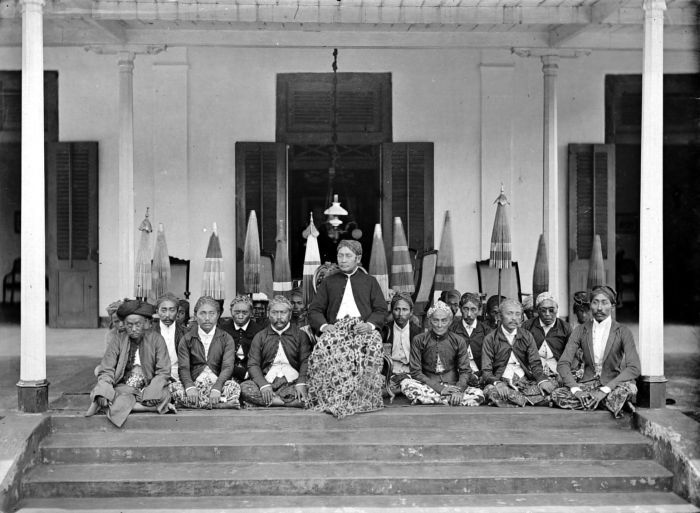

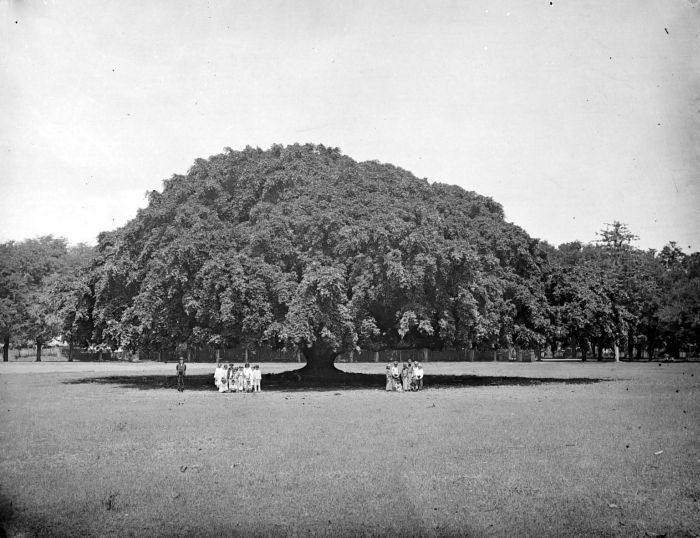
Two groups of men under a large banyan tree in Situbondo

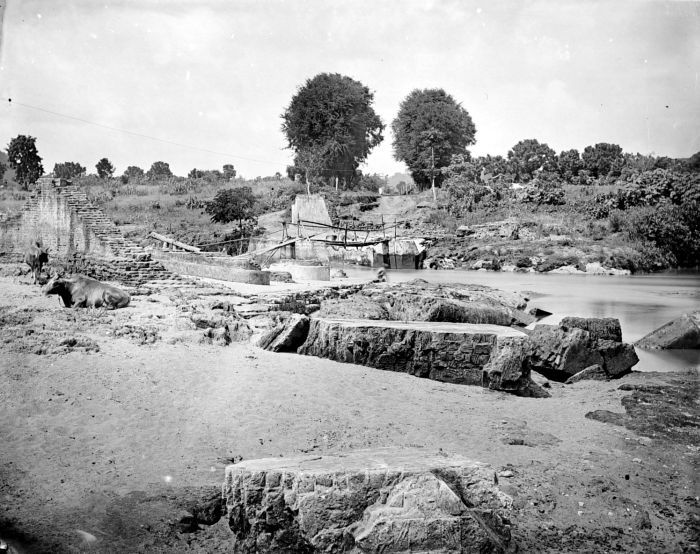
River and washed away bridge in the area of Situbondo

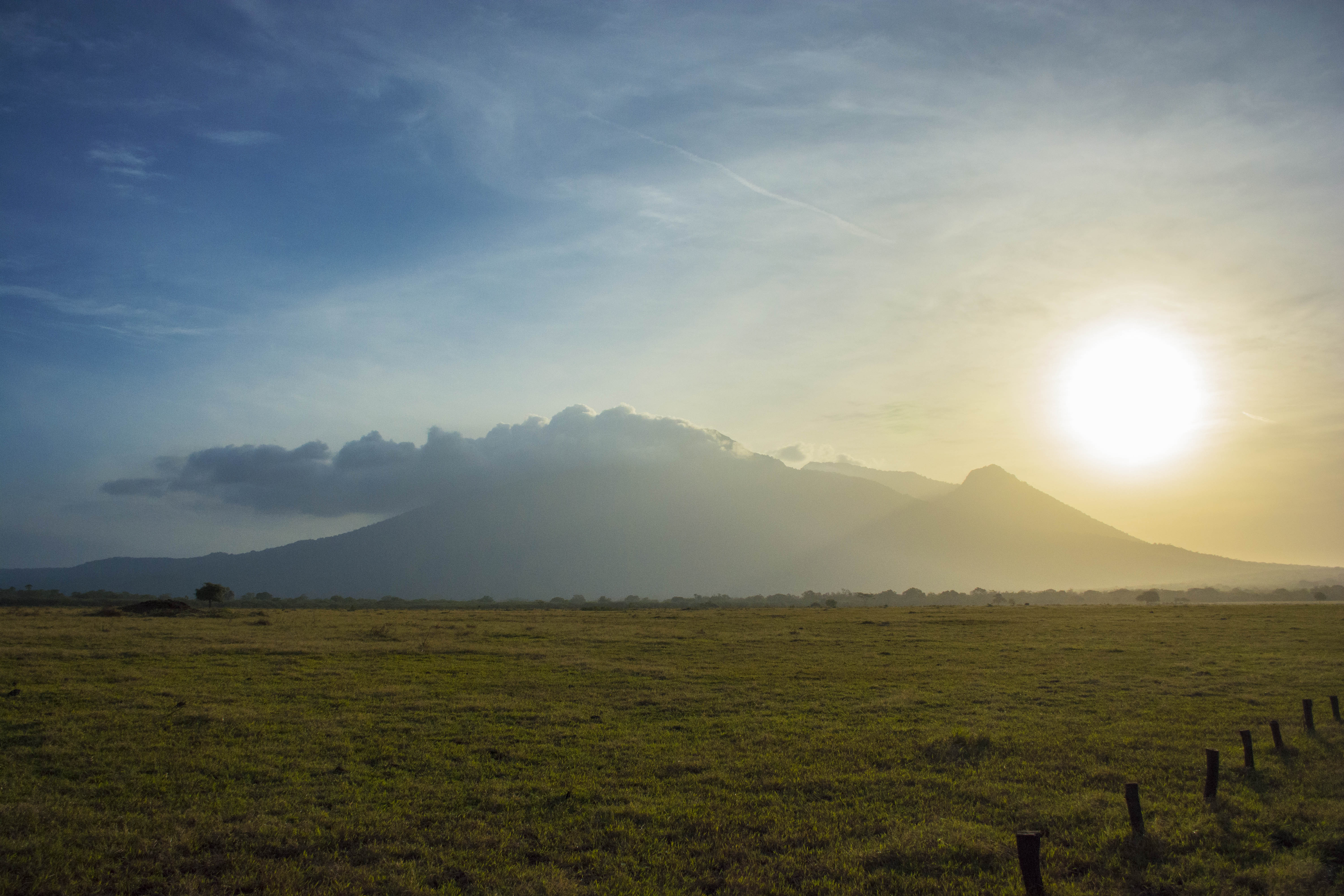
Baluran National Park
