= Femina (Indonesia) =

Indonesian weekly women's magazine (1972-2023)

- September 2012 cover of Femina
- Editor-in-Chief: Petty S Fatimah
- Categories: Women's interest
- Frequency: Weekly (1981-2017); Biweekly (1973-1980, 2017); Monthly (1972-1973, 2018-2020); Once a few months (2020-2023); Online (2023-present)
- Total circulation: 50,000 (2017)
- Founder: Sofyan Alisjahbana, Pia Alisjahbana
- First issue: 18 September 1972
- Final issue: January-April 2023 (print)
- Company: PT Prana Dinamika Sejahtera (formerly PT Gaya Favorit Press)
- Country: Indonesia
- Based in: Jakarta
- Language: Indonesian
- Website: www.femina.co.id
- ISSN: 1829-7846

Femina (stylized in all lowercase) is an Indonesian weekly women's magazine founded in 1972. The magazine is owned by Prana Group (formerly Femina Group).

== History and content ==
Femina was established in 1972, and the first issue was published in September 1972. The cover of the first issue was shot in the garage of Svida Alisjahbana, whose father was the magazine's photographer. The magazine is published every week. One of its editors was Mirta Kartohadiprodjo, Alisjahbana's aunt, and Irma Hardisurya was the fashion editor. Widarti Gunawan, publisher and later chief editor, had done an apprenticeship with Verenigde Nederlandse Uitgeverijen, the Dutch publisher of the women's magazine Margriet; along with Libelle, Margriet was one of Femina's magazine's models.

Svida Alisjahbana is the chief executive of Indonesia's Femina Group.

== Cover ==
=== Lists of actresses and models who have appeared on the cover of Femina ===
- Annisa Pohan (17-23 April 2003, 14-20 July 2005, 22-28 February 2007, 28 August-3 September 2010)
- Dian Sastrowardoyo (3-9 August 2000, 21-27 February 2002, 12-18 September 2002, 24-30 April 2003, 2005 Yearly Edition, 24-30 November 2005, 23-29 November 2006, 31 January-6 February 2008, 20-26 November 2008, 31 October-6 November 2009, 31 July-6 August 2010, 21-27 July 2012, 9-15 May 2015, August 2018)
- Bunga Citra Lestari (15-21 November 2007, 19 September-2 October 2009, 31 March-6 April 2012, 9-15 March 2013, 27 June-3 July 2015, 17-23 February 2017)
- Desy Ratnasari (6-12 May 1993, 3-9 March 1994, 29 January-11 February 1998, 27 May-2 June 1999, 23-29 December 1999, 6-12 April 2000, 5-11 February 2004, 3-16 November 2005, 12-18 April 2007)
- Sophia Latjuba (29 March-4 April 1990, 2-8 December 1993, 1-7 June 1995, 21-27 December 1995, 25 June-1 July 1998, 13-19 September 2001, 18-24 July 2002, 2-8 January 2003, 3-9 June 2004)
- Nadya Hutagalung (25 December 1996-1 January 1997, 25-31 December 1997, 10-16 January 2002, 4-10 September 2003, 12-18 August 2004, 28 September-4 October 2006, 18-24 December 2010)
- Marsha Timothy (12-18 July 2007, 30 January-5 February 2010, 17-23 December 2011, 24-30 May 2012, 9-15 November 2013, June 2017, March 2019)
- Ruth Sahanaya (26 October-1 November 1989, 19-25 December 1996, 22-28 April 2004)
- Agnez Mo (4-10 January 2007, 11-17 April 2009, 1-7 January 2011, 2012 Yearly Edition)
- Andien (21-27 August 2010, 29 September-5 October 2012, 21-27 April 2017)
- Carissa Putri (3-9 July 2008, 28 March-3 April 2009, 12-18 March 2011, 25 February-2 March 2012, 13-19 September 2014)
- Adinia Wirasti (3-9 December 2011, 1-7 March 2014, 7-13 November 2015, May 2019)
- Prisia Nasution (14-20 April 2012, 7-13 February 2015, October 2019)
- Elvira Devinamira (3-9 May 2014, 21-27 March 2015)
- Wanda Hamidah (4-10 January 1996, 15-21 July 1999, 17-23 May 2001, 12-18 May 2005)
- Sandra Dewi (1-7 May 2008, 22-28 January 2009, 8-14 August 2009, 9-15 February 2013, 1-7 August 2015, 17-23 December 2016, April 2019)
- Tuti Indra Malaon (September 1972)
- Andi Meriem Matalatta (March 1977)
- Dewi Ja (October 1977)
- Leny Marlina (December 1978)
- Nungky Kusumastuti (18 August 1981, 29 November 1983)
- Dewi Sukarno (27 April 1982)
- Marissa Haque (26 October 1982, 13 September 1983, 24 April 1984, 12 February 1987)
- Chintami Atmanegara (13 August 1985)
- Vina Panduwinata (20 December 1983, 22 January 1987)
- Camelia Malik (21 June 1983, 13 August 1985)
- Betharia Sonata (22 October 1985, 1986 Yearly Edition)
- La Rose (22 April 1986)
- Nena Rosier (19 February 1987)
- Lydia Kandou (1988 Yearly Edition)
- Diah Permatasari (11-17 May 1989, 21-27 January 1993, 2-8 March 1995)
- Astrid Dharmawan (2 December 1986, 30 June 1988, 22-28 September 1988, 2-8 August 1990, 9-15 December 1993)
- Yana Zein (24 June 1986, 23 December 1986, 25-31 August 1988, 7-13 February 1991)
- Andri Sentanu (13-19 April 1989, 10-16 May 1990)
- Monica Oemardi (7-13 November 1991)
- Ratih Sanggarwati (23-29 January 1992)
- Vera Kinan (21 July 1988, 15-21 December 1988, 1990 Yearly Edition, 17-23 September 1992)
- Rindu Wastuti (29 April-5 May 1993)
- Marisa Lungo (7-13 July 1994, 21-27 November 1996, 12-18 April 2001, 21-27 June 2001, 2-8 May 2002)
- Dina Lorenza (25-31 August 1994, 6-12 February 1997)
- Vanty Veronica (2-8 February 1995, 24-30 July 1997)
- Femmy Permatasari (17-23 April 1997, 20-26 January 2000)
- Avi Basuki (26 January-1 February 1995, 30 March-5 April 1995, 19-25 October 1995, 25-31 December 2003)
- Dian Nitami (1-7 November 1990, 5-11 November 1992, 18-24 June 1995, 14-20 December 2000, 29 January-4 February 2004)
- Elma Theana (4-10 April 1996, 28 August-3 September 1997, 8-14 July 2004)
- Fahrani (27 June-3 July 2002, 27 March-2 April 2003, 24-30 May 2007, 2008 Yearly Edition, 4-10 April 2009)
- Romanka Suwandi (31 October-6 November 1991)
- Indira Sudiro (5-11 December 1991, 1995 Yearly Edition)
- Tiara Tian (5-11 January 1995, 2-8 January 1997, 22-28 February 2001)
- Dewi Gita (12-18 October 1995)
- Bella Esperance (7-13 December 1995)
- Ristanti Aquarini (4-10 July 1996)
- Inneke Koesherawati (22-28 May 1997, 16-22 July 1998)
- Jana Gunawanova (2-8 April 1998)
- Rita Herawati (29 October-4 November 1998)
- Laura Antonietta (12-18 November 1998)
- Elva Marliah (21-27 March 1996, 12-18 March 1998, 10-16 December 1998)
- Sherina Munaf (2-8 October 2010, April 2018)
- Ratu Felisha (4-10 October 2001)
- Noviati Emerson (23-29 October 2003)
- Dhini Aminarti (13-19 March 2008)
- Donita (13-19 November 2008, 8-14 December 2012)
- Nadia Saphira (8-14 January 2009, 13-19 November 2010)
- Bella Saphira (25 November-1 December 1993, 14-20 September 1995, 5-11 June 1997, 16-22 December 1999, 26 February-3 March 2004, 15-21 December 2005)
- Novita Angie (1-7 March 2007)
- Anita Hara (10-16 August 2006)
- Duma Riris Silalahi (21-27 September 2006, 25-31 January 2007, 18-24 July 2009, 28 September-4 October 2013)
- Yuanita Christiani (14-20 November 2009)
- Mieke Amalia (14-20 March 1996, 13-19 August 1998, 8-14 December 2005)
- Paramitha Rusady (7-13 May 1992)
- Vira Yuniar (12-18 August 1999, June 2004)
- Rieke Diah Pitaloka (18-24 August 2005)
- Cut Mini Theo (1-7 July 1993, 14-20 October 1993, 16-22 March 1995, 7-13 March 1996, 18-24 December 2003)
- Luna Maya (15-21 May 2003, 9-15 December 2004, 28 June-4 July 2007, 26 June-2 July 2008, 2-8 May 2009)
- Albina (3-9 February 2005)
- Rebecca Reijman (6-12 December 2007, 7-12 April 2012)
- Audy Item (12-18 June 2010)
- Farah Quinn (7-13 November 2009)
- Shahnaz Soehartono (21-27 November 2009, 30 July-5 August 2011, 10-16 October 2015)
- Poppy Sovia (15-21 October 2011)
- Franda (22-28 October 2011)
- Alfa Dian Puspa Arini (17-23 March 2012)
- Ririn Dwi Ariyanti (13-19 December 2007, 18-24 September 2010)
- Astrid Tiar (14-20 August 2010, 14-20 May 2011, 19-25 May 2012, 14-20 September 2013, 13-19 December 2014)
- Nirina Zubir (30 August-5 September 2014)
- Firrina Sinatrya (31 December 2011-6 January 2012, 19-25 November 2016)
- Titi Sjuman (2009 Yearly Edition, 12-18 September 2009, 3-9 April 2010, 23-29 April 2011)
- Ida Iasha (23 September 1986, 19 March 1987, 23 July 1987, 17-23 November 1994, 2-8 May 1996)
- Sheila Majid (17 September 1987, 3 December 1987, 7-13 April 1994, 17-23 July 1997, 11-17 March 2004)
- Donna Harun (6-12 December 1990, 29 August-4 September 1991, 18-24 November 1993, 14-20 December 1995, 25-31 January 1996, 9-15 May 2002)
- Maudy Koesnaedi (21-27 September 1995, 18-24 January 1996, 8-14 August 1996, 4-10 June 1998, 9-15 September 1999, 19-25 April 2001, 5-11 August 2004, 7-13 December 2006, 15-21 June 2013)
- Cornelia Agatha (25-31 July 1996, 29 July-4 August 1999, 30 March-5 April 2006)
- Linda Ramadhanty (20-26 June 1996, 27 February-5 March 1997, 20-26 May 1999, 2000 Yearly Edition)
- Hera Miranda Yusuf (11-17 July 1996)
- Yuni Shara (18-24 March 1999, 30 December 1999-5 January 2000, 2-8 March 2006)
- Diana Pungky (8-14 January 1998, 9-15 September 2004, 29 December 2005-4 January 2006, 31 May-6 June 2007)
- Ayu Azhari (9 April 1987, 5-11 January 1989, 11-17 January 1990, 2-8 March 2000)
- Rossa (27 May-2 June 2004, 11-17 May 2006, 25-31 December 2008, 16-22 January 2010)
- Wulan Guritno (6-12 May 1999, 17-23 January 2002, 22-28 July 2004, 8-14 June 2006, 10-16 May 2007)
- Acha Septriasa (17-23 October 2009, 27 August-2 September 2011, 12-18 January 2013, 17-23 May 2014, 27 February-4 March 2016, 27 August-2 September 2016)
- Feby Febiola (22-28 April 1999, 27 December 2001-2 January 2002, 24-30 July 2003, 27 July-2 August 2006)
- Indah Kalalo (15-21 April 1999, 29 June-5 July 2000, 5-11 April 2001, 8-14 May 2003, 19-25 November 2011)
- Paula Verhoeven (14-20 March 2009, 26 March-1 April 2011)
- Shanty (22-28 March 2001, 20-26 March 2003, 6-12 October 2005, 8-14 February 2007, 26 June-2 July 2010, 1-7 September 2012)
- Krisdayanti (24-30 March 1994, 25 April-1 May 1996, 2002 Yearly Edition, 16-22 May 2002, 11-17 December 2003, 19-25 April 2007, 17-23 April 2008)
- Cut Tari (6-12 August 1998, 13-19 April 2000, 3-9 January 2002, 25-31 July 2002, 15-21 January 2004, 27 November-3 December 2008)
- Tamara Geraldine (1-7 October 1998)
- Denada (29 May-4 June 2008, 6-12 November 2010)
- Titi Kamal (23-29 May 2002, 15-21 July 2004, 15-21 June 2006, March 2020)
- Tamara Bleszynski (16-22 May 1996, 9-15 November 2000, 19-25 July 2001, 30 December 2004-5 January 2005, 1-7 December 2005)
- Sarah Sechan (14-20 November 1996, 19-25 June 1997, 17-23 December 1998, 30 November-6 December 2000)
- Mayangsari (13-19 July 2000, 23-29 January 2003)
- Eunike Fedora Sinulingga (14-20 November 2002)
- Ayu Dewi (27 March-2 April 2010, 28 April-4 May 2012)
- Laudya Cynthia Bella (7-13 March 2009, 4-17 September 2010, 26 October-1 November 2013)
- Isyana Sarasvati (30 July-5 August 2016)
- Lulu Tobing (2-8 April 1997, 3-9 December 1998, 28 January-3 February 1999, 8-14 August 2002)
- Ladya Cheryl (24-30 August 2000, 8-14 March 2001, 1-7 August 2002, 10-16 July 2008)
- Jana Parengkuan (2-8 April 1998, 16-22 November 2000, 2-8 August 2001)
- Marisa Lungo (12-18 April 2001, 21-27 June 2001, 2-8 May 2002)
- Susan Bachtiar (5-11 May 1994, 9-15 November 1995, 9-15 January 1997, 20-26 April 2000)
- Ade Herlina (7-13 May 1998)
- Alisia Rininta (8-14 June 2013)
- Olivia Jensen (20-26 December 2014, 12-18 December 2015)
- Nina Tamam (27 October-2 November 2005)
- Marshanda (21-27 February 2009)
- Puput Novel (6-12 April 1995)
- Safina Hussein (9-15 May 1996)
- Btari Karlinda (14-20 November 1991)
- Sarah Azhari (24 April-1 May 1997, 10-16 June 1999)
- Marini Zumarnis (6-12 December 2001)
- Brianna Simorangkir (5-11 November 2016)
- Tya Ariestya (2-8 May 2015)
- Cathy Sharon (21-27 April 2005, 7-13 June 2007, 28 February-6 March 2009, 2-8 July 2011, 10-16 May 2014, 5-11 March 2016, September-October 2020)
- Julie Estelle (11-17 December 2008, 24-30 July 2010, 30 June-6 July 2012, 12-18 April 2014, 31 March-6 April 2017, March 2018)
- Larasati Gading (3-9 July 1997, 27 November-3 December 1997, 7-13 March 2002)
- Titi DJ (9 December 1986, 30 January 1988, 7-13 October 1999, 27 September-3 October 2001, 16-22 January 2003, 19-25 January 2006)
- Maudy Ayunda (12-18 September 2015, 23-29 July 2016)
- Sigi Wimala (26 December 2002-1 January 2003, 21-27 August 2003, 3-9 March 2005, 15-21 March 2007, 14-20 August 2008, 21-27 May 2011, 28 July-3 August 2012, 22-28 November 2014, December 2020-January 2021)
- Happy Salma (11-17 January 2007, 11-17 January 2014)
- Revalina S. Temat (20-26 March 2008, 21-27 March 2009, 14-20 August 2010, 29 October-4 November 2011, 17-23 November 2012)
- Tia Ivanka (7-13 November 2002)
- Della Puspita (21-27 November 2002)
- Karenina Anderson (31 July-6 August 1997, 28 April-3 May 2000, 5-11 July 2001, 27 September-3 October 2007)
- Sutra Kharmelia (Ex-news anchor Lativi and Global TV, 19-25 June 2003)
- Gita Gutawa (26 March-1 April 2016)
- Chilla Kiana (12-18 November 2016)
- Reza Artamevia (30 July-5 August 1998, 17-23 November 2005)
- Raisa (6-12 September 2014, 26 November-2 December 2016)
- Nasya Marcella (2-8 April 2016)
- Indah Permatasari (16-22 April 2016)
- Naila Alatas (6-12 January 2000)
- Susan Bachtiar (9-15 January 1997, 20-26 April 2000, 26 April-2 May 2007)
- Catherine Wilson (28 June-4 July 2001, 19-25 July 2007)
- Dhea Ananda (22-28 May 2008)
- Olla Ramlan (28 March-3 April 2002)
- Rahma Landy (1-7 September 2005, 13-19 August 2011)
- Ajeng Kamaratih (19 October-1 November 2006, 22-28 June 2013)
- Asmirandah (1-7 August 2009)
- Jihan Fahira (2-8 July 1998, 12-18 November 1998, 9-15 March 2000, 13-19 March 2003, 13-19 May 2004)
- Aimee Juliette (4-10 February 1999, 4-10 July 2002)
- Ersa Mayori (4-10 March 1999, 5-12 March 2008, 15-21 August 2009, 1-7 May 2010)
- Anindya Kusuma Putri (15-21 August 2015)
- Ananda Lontoh (18-24 May 2000)
- Wiwied Muljana (21-27 May 1998, 18-24 April 2002)
- Endhita (23-29 April 1998, 9-15 January 2003, 2-8 August 2007, 15-21 May 2008)
- Chelsea Islan (29 March-4 April 2014, 6-12 June 2015)
- Ira Wibowo (1-7 June 2000)
- Caroline Zachrie (12-18 June 1997, 25-31 March 1999, 5-11 August 1999, 6-12 July 2000, 2001 Yearly Edition, 26 June-2 July 2003)
- Alexandra Gottardo (7-13 August 2010)
- Marsyel Christadela (15-21 January 2011)
- Elfride Tarihoran (22-28 January 2011)
- Ilmira Usmanova (2-8 April 2011)
- Sophie Navita (4-10 June 2011)
- Astrid Ellena (24-30 December 2011)
- Claudia Hidayat (15-21 November 2001)
- Devi Permatasari (3-9 October 1996)
- Febby Lawrence (16-22 March 2000, 8-14 June 2000)
- Tika Bravani (27 July-2 August 2013, 14-20 March 2015, 19-25 May 2017)
- Ria Irawan (31 August-6 September 1989, 18-24 February 1993, 17-23 June 1993, 10-16 April 1997, 30 March-5 April 2000)
- Maia Estianty (9-15 October 2003, 5-11 April 2007)
- Atiqah Hasiholan (1-7 January 2009, 19-25 June 2010, 2011 Yearly Edition, 1-7 October 2011, 6-12 April 2013, 4-10 April 2015)
- Dewi Rezer (8-14 March 2007, 11-17 July 2009)
- Anggun C. Sasmi (23-29 November 2000, 2004 Yearly Edition, 18-24 May 2006, 28 December 2006-3 January 2007, 31 January-6 February 2009, 4-10 May 2013)
- Mariana Renata (2-8 December 1999, 21 December 2000-3 January 2001, 12-18 July 2001, 2-8 December 2004, 18-24 January 2007, 23-29 January 2010, 29 May-4 June 2010)
- Shirley Margaretha (18-24 January 2001, 30 November-6 December 2001)
- Egidia Savitri (3-9 July 2003)
- Franciene Roosenda (4-10 December 2008)
- Imelda Therinne (30 January-5 February 2003, 23-29 August 2007, 3-16 August 2013)
- Devinta Kirana (19-25 December 2009, 10-16 December 2016)
- Cut Keke (8-14 July 1999)
- Maria Agnes (26 April-2 May 2001, 27 February-5 March 2003)
- Fifi Aleyda Yahya (4-10 May 2000)
- Sarah Judith (17-23 August 2000)
- Anesia Tania (23 February-1 March 2013)
- Aulia Sarah (30 March-5 April 2013)
- Ririn Ekawati (11-17 May 2013, November 2017)
- Bunga Jelitha (25-31 May 2013, 26 May-1 June 2017)
- Louise Anastasya (29 March-4 April 2001, 29 June-5 July 2013)
- Jill Gladys (6-12 July 2013)
- Zivanna Letisha (24-30 October 2009, 13-19 July 2013)
- Vinny Verrina Nasution (20-26 July 2013)
- Nadine Alexandra (31 August-6 September 2013)
- Annisa Putri Ayudya (17-23 August 2013)
- Millane Fernandez (10-16 December 2011, 19-25 October 2013)
- Whulandary Herman (13-19 March 2010, 3-9 November 2012, 28 December 2013-3 January 2014, 7-13 March 2015)
- Gracia Indri (30 May-5 June 2015)
- Dinna Olivia (2-8 September 1999, 1-7 March 2001, 22-28 May 2003, 20-26 January 2005, 2007 Yearly Edition)
- Desy Chang (7-13 February 2002)
- Memes (7 May 1987, 7 April 1988, 14-20 May 1992)
- Ikke Nurjannah (9-15 July 1998)
- Nabila Syakieb (15-21 December 2012)
- Nikita Willy (16-22 November 2013)
- Marcella Zalianty (20-26 February 2003, 6-12 January 2005, 10-16 April 2008, 25-31 December 2010)
- Dominique Diyose (18-24 April 2009, 26 February-4 March 2011, 14-20 February 2015, January 2019)
- Rachel Maryam (6-12 February 2003, 10-16 March 2005, 21-27 June 2007, 17-23 July 2010)
- Davina Veronica (18-24 December 1997, 9-15 December 1999, 14-20 June 2001, 30 May-5 June 2002, 7-13 August 2008)
- Sari Nila (26 October-1 November 2000, 31 March-6 April 2005)
- Velove Vexia (24-30 September 2011, 22-28 September 2012, 11-17 October 2014, 5-11 September 2015)
- Marissa Nasution (15-21 January 2009, 3-9 July 2010, 25 June-1 July 2011)
- Lula Kamal (4-10 August 2005)
- Raline Shah (19-25 March 2011, 18-24 August 2012, 20-26 April 2013, 10-16 February 2017, November 2017)
- Renata Kusmanto (9-15 August 2014, 13-19 June 2015, September 2017)
- Juwita Rahmawati (28 May-3 June 2016)
- Izabel Jahja (31 January-6 February 2002)
- Tracy Trinita (1-7 January 1998, 24-30 December 1998, 2-8 November 2000, 13-26 December 2001, 10-16 April 2003, 30 September-6 October 2004, 20-26 December 2007)
- Tara Basro (27 September-3 October 2014, 13-19 February 2016)
- Yasmine Wildblood (16-22 June 2012)
- Asmara Abigail (29 October-4 November 2016, January 2020)
- Siti Nurhaliza (24-30 June 2004, 12-18 October 2006)
- Inul Daratista (29 May-5 June 2003)
- Advina Ratnaningsih (25 April-1 May 2009, 1-7 December 2012, 8-14 November 2014)
- Amber Chia (9-15 May 2009)
- Olga Lydia (6-12 June 2009)
- Alena (27 June-3 July 2009, 27 October-2 November 2012)
- Senk Lotta (8-14 November 2007, 25-31 July 2009)
- Lenna Tan (12-18 December 2009)
- Imelda Therine (23-29 August 2007, 3-17 August 2013)
- Raihaanun (16-22 October 2010)
- Kimmy Jayanti (4-10 December 2010, 2010 Yearly Edition)
- Tasya Farasya (June 2019)
- Rinni Wulandari (4-10 June 2016)
- Arzeti Bilbina (21-27 August 1997, 15-21 January 1998, 26 November-2 December 1998, 25-31 May 2000, 2003 Yearly Edition, 4-10 March 2004)
- Yuki Kato (18-24 June 2016)
- Michelle Ziudith (6-12 August 2016)
- Ratu Fatimah (14-20 January 2017)
- Sheryl Sheinafia (17-23 March 2017)
- Dewi Sandra (11-17 September 2003, 25 November-1 December 2004, 23-29 March 2006, 6-12 September 2007, 20-26 June 2009, 8-14 October 2011, 14-20 July 2012)
- Karina Salim (11-17 April 2015)
- Alexandra Asmasoebrata (12-18 May 2012, 8-14 August 2015)
- Tatjana Saphira (31 May-6 June 2014, 25-31 July 2015, November 2018)
- Alyssa Soebandono (25 April-2 May 2014)
- Mesty Ariotedjo (21-27 June 2014)
- Rianti Cartwright (1-7 June 2006, 24-30 July 2008, 5-11 March 2011, 3-9 October 2015, 24-30 March 2017)
- Natalie Margareth (4-10 November 1999, 15-21 June 2000, 1-7 November 2001, 19-25 December 2002, 21-27 February 2008)
- Kelly Tandiono (1-7 June 2013, 19-25 April 2014, 23-29 April 2016)
- Putri Marino (December 2017, February 2020, April-July 2022)
- Kamidia Radisti (9-15 July 2011, 5-11 April 2014, 24-30 October 2015)
- Selma Abidin (22-28 November 2001, 12-18 June 2003)
- Ayushita (6-12 August 2011, 7-13 June 2014, 5-11 December 2015)
- Aryani Fitriana (2-8 July 2016)
- Pevita Pearce (10-16 September 2011, 23-29 March 2013, 21-27 November 2015, 16-22 July 2016)
- Andini Effendi (8-14 February 2001, 28 May-3 June 2011, 4-10 October 2014, April 2020)
- Jenny Natalia (24-30 March 2012)
- Citra Kirana (10-16 November 2012, 5-11 July 2014)
- Nabila Arlita (1-7 February 2014)
- Shabrina Sungkar (12-18 July 2014)
- Aviani Malik (26 July-8 August 2014)
- Bondhan Primanti (19-25 February 2011, 23-29 August 2014)
- Chelsea Olivia (18-24 October 2014)
- Shinta Zahara (25-31 October 2014)
- Advina (8-14 November 2014)
- Hesti Purwadinata (13-19 October 2005, 6-12 December 2014)
- Astrini Faustina (17-23 January 2015)
- Meiyola Berlina (24-30 January 2015)
- Nowela Auparay (28 February-6 March 2015)
- Ni Luh Frisilia (4-10 July 2015)
- Amila Tamadita (29 August-4 September 2015)
- Diana Suriani (17-23 October 2015)
- Nina Kozok (19-25 December 2015)
- Putri Windasari (9-15 January 2016)
- Maria Harfanti (30 January-5 February 2016)
- Sarah Sinaga (19-25 March 2016)
- Juwita Rahmawati (18-24 January 2014, 28 May-3 June 2016)
- Nadia Mulya (23-29 August 2001, 7-13 August 2003)
- Vanesha Prescilla (June 2018)
- Karina Nadila (7-13 May 2016)
- Talitha Andini (19-25 January 2013, 14-20 May 2016)
- Made Ika (21-27 May 2016)
- Alessandra Usman (12-18 March 2016)
- Ayu Gani (3-9 March 2012, 2013 Yearly Edition, 25 April-1 May 2015, 3-9 September 2016, July 2018)
- Jessica Evelyn (22-28 February 2014, 14-20 November 2015, 28 January-3 February 2017)
- Kirana Larasati (11-24 July 2015)
- Gista Putri (10-17 September 2016)
- Kezia Warouw (1-7 October 2016)
- Dara Warganegara (8-14 October 2016)
- Marcella Tanaya (15-21 October 2016)
- Gresya Maaliwuga (22-28 October 2016)
- Devina Mahendriyani (3-9 December 2016)
- Cahya Purwaningtyas (4-10 February 2017)
- Ully Triani (31 October-6 November 2015, 24 February-2 March 2017)
- Jessica Mila (3-9 March 2017)
- Zackia Arfan (10-16 March 2017)
- Eva Celia (15-21 November 2014, 14-20 April 2017)
- Dilla Fadiela (28 April-4 May 2017)
- Michelle Tahalea (July 2017)
- Putu Maysa (September 2017)
- Cinta Laura (October 2017)
- Nana Mirdad (December 2017)
- Kevin Liliana (January 2018)
- Patricia Gouw (29 January-4 February 2011, 27 April-3 May 2013, 28 November-4 December 2014, 26 September-2 October 2015, 25 June-1 July 2016, March-June 2021)
- Yura Yunita (October 2018)
- Diana Loo (December 2018)
- Renatta Moeloek (July 2019)
- Sere Kalina (26 January-1 February 2013, 11-17 June 2016)
- Harly Valentina (2-8 March 2013, 22-28 August 2015)
- Laura Basuki (4-10 July 2009, 5-11 May 2012, 16-22 May 2015, August 2019)
- Ayu Nisa Nurfitri (23-29 January 2016)
- Tiffany Zhu (7-13 January 2017)
- Evanny Wityo (7-13 April 2017)
- Ayla Dimitri (November 2019)
- Mikha Tambayong (28 June-4 July 2014, August-October 2021)
- Arawinda Kirana (December 2021-March 2022)
- Ariel Tatum (January-April 2023)

=== Special Cover ===
- Enny Soekamto & Ratna Dhoemilah (May 1978)
- Dewi Yull & Ray Sahetapy (1987 Yearly Edition)
- Addie MS & Memes (7-13 September 1989)
- Vera Kinan, Miriam Wiwied Muljana, Seliana Sofyan, Sarah Dharmawan, Ira Duaty & Elizabeth (20-26 September 1990)
- Ira Duaty, Florence & Elizabeth (5-11 September 1991)
- Avi Basuki & Didi Mirhad (1993 Yearly Edition)
- Sarah Dharmawan & Astrid Dharmawan (7-13 January 1993)
- Wajah Femina 1993 (27 May-2 June 1993)
- Dede Yusuf & Desy Ratnasari (1994 Yearly Edition)
- Donna Harun & Sandy Harun (6-12 January 1994)
- Marissa Haque, Soraya Haque & Shahnaz Haque (20-26 January 1994)
- Fifi Tanjung & Sita Tanjung (27 January-2 February 1994)
- Wajah Femina 1994 (30 June-6 July 1994)
- Wajah Femina 1995 (22-28 June 1995)
- Linda Ramadhanty, Ristanti Aquarini, Hera Miranda Yusuf, Nira Stania & Vera Itabiliana (13-19 June 1996)
- Wanda Hamidah & Hilda Arifin (5-11 September 1996)
- Elizabeth & Penty Djani (12-18 September 1996)
- Laura Antoinetta & Marisa Lungo (26 September-2 October 1996)
- Cut Tari & Jihan Fahira (4-10 September 1997)
- Krisdayanti, Ine Febrianti, Dian Nitami & Vira Yuniar (25 September-1 October 1997)
- Kinaryosih, Lola Amaria, Mira Yuliana Ekasari, Lonny Juanita Nareswari & Dyah Wijayaningrum (16-22 October 1997)
- Desy Andriani, Ratna Arivianti, Ria Yunilda, Marina Anggari & Rita Herawati (27 August-2 September 1998)
- Angel Ibrahim & Donna Harun (17-23 September 1998)
- Karenina Anderson & Ari Wibowo (1999 Yearly Edition)
- Reza Artamevia & Adjie Massaid (11-17 February 1999)
- Anjasmara & Dian Nitami (1-7 July 1999)
- Marcellino Lefrandt & Audrey Herawati (16-22 September 1999)
- Kinaryosih & Dechi (23-29 September 1999)
- Maudy Koesnaedi & Ari Sihasale (17-23 February 2000)
- AB Three (27 July-2 August 2000, 29 September-5 October 2005, 22-28 May 2010)
- Dinna Olivia & Mariana Renata (14-20 September 2000)
- Atalarik Syah, Bella Saphira, Primus Yustisio & Ronny Sianturi (28 September-4 October 2000)
- Ferry Salim & Lola Amaria (15-21 February 2001)
- Karenina Anderson & Bertrand Antolin (6-12 September 2001)
- Victoria Margareta, Dea Mirella & Nina Tamam (20-26 September 2001)
- Sigi Wimala & Irwan Chandra (14-20 February 2002)
- Davina Veronica, Indah Kalalo, Desi Mulasari, Maria Agnes (28 February-6 March 2002)
- Olga Lidya, Enditha & Ira Duaty (25 April-1 May 2002)
- Wella Monista, Ellen Alexander, Dian Ristiani, Nurulita Purna Tri Utami, Cahaya Mustika & Wiraswanty Dwinanda (15-21 August 2002)
- Dewi Lestari & Marcell (13-19 February 2003)
- Melyani, Noviati Emerson, Shinta Zahara, Indriana Fatmasari & Lili Pandjaitan (28 August-3 September 2003)
- Dinna Olivia, Marcella Zalianty & Mariana Renata (12-18 February 2004)
- Amanda Dwi Aditya, Mathilda Rinta Ayunda, Felicia Marina Moalim, Dwi Ayu Ross Miranty & Afni Aria Ningsih (26 August-1 September 2004)
- Nadia Mulya, Alia Miranti & Melyani (2-8 September 2004)
- Olla Ramlan & Alex Tian (23-29 September 2004)
- Maia Estianty & Ahmad Dhani (17-23 February 2005)
- Rahma Landy, Hesti Purwadinata, Francine Roosenda, Pradita Apriyani & Kartika Ayuningtyas (25-31 August 2005)
- Krisdayanti, Agnez Mo & Ruth Sahanaya (22-28 September 2005)
- Marcella Zalianty, Naila Alatas & Olga Lidya (2006 Yearly Edition)
- Ayu Azhari, Sarah Azhari & Rahma Azhari (5-11 January 2006)
- Sophia Latjuba & Eva Celia (16-21 February 2006)
- Nia Dinata, Djenar Maesa Ayu & Nadine (6-12 April 2006)
- Lula Kamal, Sonia Wibisono & Angelique Wijaya (27 April-3 May 2006)
- Tamara Bleszynski & Luna Maya (3-9 August 2006)
- Ajeng Kamaratih, Anggraini Soraya, Cut Nuremelia, Duma Riris, Tri Ayu Rulliati & Bona Dea Kometa (14-20 September 2006)
- Nova Eliza, Victoria Margaretha & Tracy Trinita (14-20 December 2006)
- Titi Kamal & Christian Sugiono (15-21 February 2007, 2015 Yearly Edition)
- Marcella Zalianty, Darius Sinathrya, Winky Wiryawan, Nicholas Saputra & Tora Sudiro (22-28 March 2007)
- Linda Ramadhanty & Yoelitta Palar (3-9 May 2007)
- Ully Triani, Hilyani Hidranto, Arininthiya Triaswari, Delita Juwita & Nadine Zamira Sjarief (13-19 September 2007)
- Sarah Sechan, Susan Bachtiar & Rachel Maryam (17-23 January 2008)
- Wenny & Ellen Alexander (7-13 February 2008)
- Surya Saputra & Chintya Lamusu (14-20 February 2008)
- Terry Puteri & Fiantika Ambadar (27 March-2 April 2008)
- Rahma Landy, Francine Roosenda, Duma Riris & Joice Triatman (3-9 April 2008)
- Naily Maulida, Rachmawati, Sesil Istari, Farah Annisa Fajriati & Whulandary Herman (4-10 September 2008)
- Marsha Timothy & Fachry Albar (14-20 February 2009)
- Rheina Bintang, Riana Ambarani, Cut Nuremelia & Maisura Masita (23-29 May 2009)
- Shahnaz Soehartono, Dinantiar Anditra, Ratih Rahmawati, Devinta Kirana & Resty Tri Wijayanti (2-8 January 2010)
- Dion Wiyoko, Teuku Wisnu, Vino G Bastian & Cathy Sharon (13-19 February 2010)
- Aline Tumbuan & Pamela (6-12 March 2010)
- Teuku Zacky & Ilmira (20-26 March 2010, 15-21 February 2014)
- Imelda Therinne & Shareefa Daanish (10-16 April 2010)
- Yuni Shara & Krisdayanti (5-11 June 2010)
- Rahma Landy & Shahnaz Soehartono (10-16 July 2010)
- Albertina Francisca Mailoa, Lestyowati & Adila Megawati (5-11 February 2011)
- Laudya Chintya Bella & Chicco Jerikho (12-18 February 2011)
- Whulandary Herman & Jessie Setiono (16-22 April 2011)
- Maylaffayza & Mesty Ariotedjo (11-17 June 2011)
- Bunga Citra Lestari & Ashraf Sinclair (18-24 June 2011)
- Ayu Gani, Melia Octavia, Jeny Natalia, Alfa Dian, Cynthia Amanda, Amila Tamadita, Raisa Adila & Dyah Astari (7-13 January 2012)
- Shireen Sungkar & Teuku Wisnu (11-17 February 2012)
- Imelda Kartini, Stella Rissa & Kleting (21-27 April 2012)
- Patricia Gouw & Aldila Wisusena (2-8 June 2012)
- Alfoncius & Rianti Cartwright (13-19 October 2012)
- Whulandary Herman, Christian Sugiono, Joe Taslim & Ashraf Sinclair (16-22 March 2013)
- Rio Dewanto & Atiqah Hasiholan (12-18 October 2013)
- Paula Verhoeven, Advina Ratnaningsih & Reti Ragil (2014 Yearly Edition)
- Juwita Rahmawati, Nabila Arlita, Michelle Sow, Shabrina Sungkar, Jessica Evelyn, Muti'ah Murni, Cindy Erika & Hanny Fenesia (4-10 January 2014)
- Hanny Fenesia, Cindy Erika & Muti'ah Murni (8-14 March 2014)
- Kleting, Ardistia, Peggy Hartanto, Inneke Margarethe & Imelda Kartini (14-20 June 2014)
- Dian Sastrowardoyo, Titi Kamal, Ladya Cheryl, Sissy Priscillia & Adinia Wirasti (27 December 2014-2 January 2015)
- Alya Nurshabrina, Astrini Faustina, Meiyola Berlina, Ni Luh Frisilia, Shabrina Ayu, Kunthi Tyas Puruhita & Rizkho Maulida Bustomi (3-9 January 2015)
- Putri Miranti & Rinrin Marinka (28 March-3 April 2015)
- Cathy Sharon & Julie Estelle (24-30 April 2008, 18-24 April 2015)
- Ririn Ekawati & Rini Yulianti (20-26 June 2015)
- Andini Effendi, Ayu Gani, Whulandary Herman, Melinda Widjanarko, Olga Lydia, Advina Ratnaningsih, Isyana Bagoes Oka, Ira Duati & Lola Amaria (19-25 September 2015)
- Haslinda & Cut Nuremelia (28 November-4 December 2015)
- Salma Mochtar, Salwa Mochtar & Nadine Waworuntu (26 December 2015-1 January 2016)
- Chelsea Olivia & Glenn Alinskie (2016 Yearly Edition)
- Putri Windasari, Levina Faby, Nisa Ayu Nurfitri, Made Ika, Sarah Sinaga, Fitrah Islami, Putri Dina Maharita & Ranieta (2-8 January 2016)
- Astrini Faustina & Deasy Julius (6-12 February 2016)
- Putri Dina Maharita, Fitrah Islami & Patricia Ranieta (20-26 February 2016)
- Elvira Devinamira, Anindya Kusuma Putri & Whulandary Herman (9-15 April 2016)
- Nicholas Saputra, Sissy Priscillia, Titi Kamal, Dian Sastrowardoyo & Adinia Wirasti (29 April-6 May 2016)
- Chelsea Islan, Bunga Citra Lestari & Tara Basro (13-19 August 2016)
- Jennie Zhang, Shareefa Daanish & Nagita Slavina (17-23 September 2016)
- Widika Sidmore & Tatyana Akman (24-30 December 2016)
- Mikha Tambayong & Dhianya Nuasnigi Zen (2017 Yearly Edition)
- Tiffany Zhu, Ratu Fatimah, Mediana Tribrata, Dilla Fadiela, Putu Maysa, Evanny Wityo & Cahaya Purwaningtyas (31 December 2016-6 January 2017)
- Ashraf Sinclair, Mike Lewis & Vino G. Bastian (5-11 May 2017)
- Raisa & Isyana Sarasvati (12-18 May 2017)
- Whulandary Herman & Artika Sari Devi (August 2017)
- Patricia Gouw, Rani Hatta & Rizkho Maulida Bustomi (2018 Yearly Edition)
- Irfan Bachdim, Jennifer Bachdim, Kiyomi Sue Bachdim & Kenji Zizou Bachdim (February 2018)
- Kelly Tandiono, Laura Muljadi & Paula Verhoeven (May 2018)
- Maudy Ayunda, Ririn Ekawati, Najwa Shihab, Raline Shah, Agatha Suci, Silvia Halim & Angkie Yudistia (September 2018)
- Nadine Chandrawinata & Dimas Anggara (February 2019)
- Happy Salma, Tjok Gus Dwi Santana Kerthyasa, Tjokorda Sri Kinandari Kerthyasa & Tjokorda Ngurah Rayidaru Kerthyasa (September 2019)
- Rory Asyari, Richard Kyle & Morgan Oey (December 2019)
- Stay at Home during COVID-19 pandemic (May 2020)

== List of editors-in-chief ==
- Mirta Kartohadiprodjo (1972–1982)
- Widarti Gunawan (1982–1999)
- Dewi Dewo (1999–2002)
- Petty S Fatimah (2003–present)

== Taglines ==
- Majalah Wanita (1972-1979)
- Bagian dari Gaya Hidup Anda (1979-1988)
- Gaya Hidup Masa Kini (1988-present)

== See also ==
- List of women's magazines
- Gadis
