= Idrus Nasir Djajadiningrat =

Indonesian diplomat (1920–1980)

Rear admiral Raden Bagus Idrus Nasir Djajadiningrat M.A.
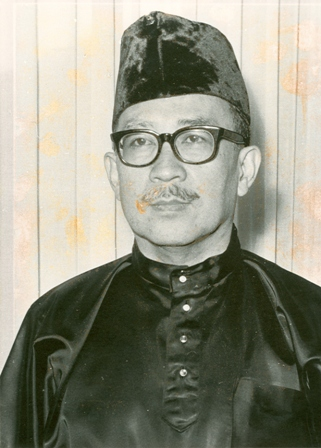
- R.B.I.N. Djajadiningrat when serves as Indonesia's Ambassador to Belgium

7th Indonesia Ambassador to Belgium
- In office 1968–1970
- Preceded by: Aboeprajitno
- Succeeded by: Chaidir Anwar Sani

9th Indonesia Ambassador to the Soviet Union
- In office 1976–1980
- Preceded by: Suryono Darusman
- Succeeded by: R.M Mohammad Choesin

Personal details
- Born: June 4, 1920 Serang, Banten, Dutch East Indies
- Died: August 24, 1980 (aged 60) Jakarta
- Resting place: Kalibata Heroes' Cemetery
- Spouse: Elise Wihelmina Loedin
- Relations: Erna Djajadiningrat (sister); Hussein Jayadiningrat (uncle); Maria Ulfah Santoso (cousin)
- Children: Raden Andra Madita Kala Djajadiningrat; Raden Ayu Kamarina Laurentia Aisya Djajadiningrat; Raden Ayu Laurentina Maryam Nurul 'Ain Djajadiningrat
- Parent(s): Ahmad Jayadiningrat (father); Raden Ajeng Suwitaningrat Sastradipura (mother)
- Education: STOVIA; Cornell University
- Occupation: Diplomat; Indonesian Navy
- Other name: Didi Djajadiningrat
- Ethnicity: Bantenese
- Nickname: R.B.N. Djajadiningrat

Military service
- Allegiance: Indonesia
- Branch/service: Indonesian Navy
- Rank: Rear admiral
- Battles/wars: Indonesian National Revolution

Rear admiral Raden Bagus Idrus Nasir Djajadiningrat, M.A. (EYD: Jayadiningrat; June 4, 1920 – August 24, 1980) also known as Didi Djajadiningrat was an Indonesian diplomat and navy officer. He also joined as a fighter for Indonesian independence in 1945 during colonial times. During the New Order period, he later became the People's Representative Council member of the ABRI fraction from Golkar appointed by Suharto.

== Biography ==
=== Early life ===
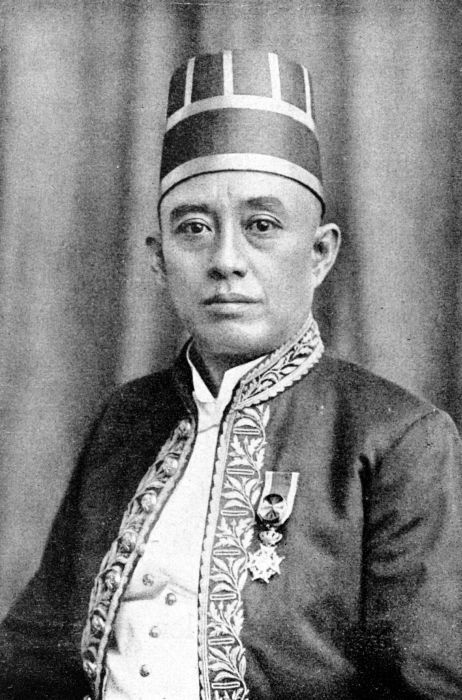
Ahmad Jayadiningrat, father of R.B.I.N. Djajadiningrat.

R.B.I.N. "Didi" was born from the Djajadiningrat family in Serang, Banten as the seventh child of eight children. One of his sisters, Erna Djajadiningrat became the first woman to receive the Guerilla Star award for her services during the struggle for Indonesian independence.

His father was Ahmad Jayadiningrat, a Bantenese nobleman who became Regent of Serang period 1901–1927. While his mother was Raden Ajeng Suwitaningrat Sastradipura, a daughter of nobles of Singaperbangsa descent, first Duke of Karawang period 1633–1677.

=== Education ===
Djajadiningrat began his formal education at the Carpentier Alting Stichting Nassau School (CAS), then proceeded to the Hogere Burgerschool (HBS) level in Batavia. After completing his HBS, he then continued his education to Geneeskundige Hoogeschool te Batavia (GHS, Medical College) which during the Japanese occupation of the Dutch East Indies renamed Ika Daigaku. (Note: Prior to 1927, GHS (later Ika Daigaku) was known as STOVIA. Then in the early days of Indonesian independence was renamed "Perguruan Tinggi Kedokteran Republik Indonesia" (Indonesian: the Medical College of the Republic of Indonesia). However, since February 2, 1950, the Government of the Republic of Indonesia turned it into the Faculty of Medicine, University of Indonesia) However, after the Proclamation of Indonesian Independence he did not continue his studies at the Faculty of Medicine, but served as a member of the Ministry of Information and became an English broadcaster on Radio Republik Indonesia.

Djajadiningrat continued his master's degree at Cornell University, United States majoring in political science. He graduated with a Master of Arts degree in 1957.

=== Personal life ===
Djajadiningrat married Elise Wihelmina Loedin and has three children: Raden Andra Madita Kala Djajadiningrat, Raden Ayu Kamarina Laurentia Aisya Djajadiningrat, and Raden Ayu Laurentina Maryam Nurul 'Ain Djajadiningrat.

== Career ==
=== Military career ===
==== Pre-independence ====
Djajadiningrat obtained his military education at Koninklijk Instituut voor de Marine (KIM) Surabaya, an officer education place founded by Conrad Emil Lambert Helfrich as a branch of the central KIM in Den Helder, Netherlands. He was a cadet of the 1940 generation, which in August 1940 was recruited to be educated for two years with 39 other cadets.

On December 8, 1941, the Dutch declared war with Japan. Three months after that Japan succeeded in occupying the Dutch East Indies, so the cadets who were conducting an officer's education were rushed to Colombo, Ceylon. Djajadiningrat along with other cadets of the 1940 generation who were educated in Colombo and following onboard operations were later appointed to be KM (Koninklijk Marine) officers on March 1, 1943. In 1945, he joined with other fighters for Indonesian independence from the Japanese occupation.

==== Post independence ====
When the transfer of the capital of the Republic of Indonesia from Jakarta to Yogyakarta in 1946, Djajadiningrat along with other Indonesian Army also moved to the city.

During the Indonesian National Revolution from 1945 to the transfer of sovereignty and the formation of the United States of Indonesia under the Dutch–Indonesian Round Table Conference on 27 December 1949, within the ranks of Navy military personnel in BKR, TKR, TNI and / or ALRI there were only two Navy officers: R. Soebijakto and RBN Djajadiningrat.

On August 5, 1947, the Operation Product concluded with the Renville Agreement signed on 17 January 1948 on the deck of the US warship, USS Renville, but the relationship between the Republic of Indonesia and the Netherlands remained unresolved. Diplomatic negotiations under the supervision of the Committee of Good Offices for Indonesia (consisting of the United States, Australia, and Belgium) are deadlocked, even the Dutch are preparing to attack the Republic of Indonesia again. The Armed Forces of the Republic of Indonesia devised a plan to deal with possible Dutch attacks. Finally, R. Soebijakto as the Chief of Staff of the Navy moved the General Headquarters of the Indonesian Navy (MBU-ALRI) to Aceh. On December 1, 1948, R. Soebijakto and his staff members departed from Yogyakarta to the area. In connection with his departure, R. Subijakto appointed Djajadiningrat (then a Lieutenant colonel) as Vice Chief of Staff of the Navy in Yogyakarta.

As a group of Vice Chief of Staff of the Navy, Lieutenant colonel R.B.N. Djajadiningrat along with several of his staff officers joined the Djawa Command Headquarters (MBKD: Markas Besar Komando Djawa) under the command of Colonel Abdul Haris Nasution who is based in Prambanan, Sleman Regency. Djajadiningrat was then appointed as MBKD Chief of Staff, while another group of staff consisting of MBU-ALRI Yogyakarta officers stationed in Imogiri to communicate with ALRI forces located around Gunungkidul Regency.

=== Political career ===
In the early days of Indonesian Independence, Djajadiningrat has become a member of the Ministry of Information. In addition, he also served as Director General of Demobilization Affairs of the Department of Transmigration, Veterans and Demobilization in Revised Ampera Cabinet in 1967. However, based on Presidential Decree of the Republic of Indonesia no. 34 Year 1968, his post as Director General of Demobilization Affairs was replaced by Arifin Syukur for his expertise as a diplomat was needed by the government.

As a diplomat, Djajadiningrat was ever be the Indonesian Ambassador to Belgium in Brussels for the period 1968-1970 and the Indonesian Ambassador to the Soviet Union in Moscow for the period 1976–1980.

In 1971, based on a decree no. 20 / LPU / 1971 dated 8 October 1971, Djajadiningrat was appointed by Suharto to become a member of the People's Representative Council from the ABRI fraction of the Golkar.

In 1973, Djajadiningrat served as Director General of Political Affairs of the Department of Foreign Affairs in the Second Development Cabinet.

== Notable works ==
- The Beginnings of the Indonesian–Dutch Negotiations and the Hoge Veluwe Talks, 1956
