= Chaidir Anwar Sani =

Indonesian diplomat (1918–1991)

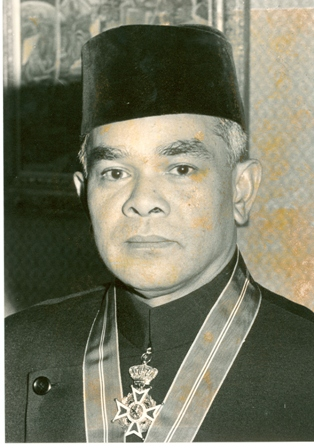

Director General of Political Affairs
- In office 5 May 1979 – 30 December 1980
- Minister: Mochtar Kusumaatmadja
- Preceded by: Suryono Darusman
- Succeeded by: Munawir Sjadzali
- In office 4 August 1966 – 30 October 1970
- Minister: Adam Malik
- Preceded by: Suwito Kusumowidagdo (Deputy for Political Affairs)
- Succeeded by: Idrus Nasir Djajadiningrat

Permanent Representative of Indonesia to the United Nations
- In office 1972–1979
- President: Suharto
- Preceded by: Ruslan Abdulgani
- Succeeded by: Abdullah Kamil

Ambassador of Indonesia to Belgium, Luxembourg, and the European Economic Community
- In office 10 October 1970 – 3 February 1972
- President: Suharto
- Preceded by: Idrus Nasir Djajadiningrat
- Succeeded by: Johan Boudewijn Paul Maramis

Personal details
- Born: February 19, 1918 Ulak Karang, Padang, West Sumatra, Dutch East Indies
- Died: December 11, 1991 (aged 73) Bogor, West Java, Indonesia
- Resting place: Tanah Kusir Cemetery
- Other political affiliations: Republic Party
- Spouse: Ernestine Stella Maria (m. 1949)
- Relations: Yoga Sugama (in-law)
- Children: 6
- Education: Leiden University (Drs.)

Chaidir Anwar Sani (19 February 1918 – 11 December 1991) was an Indonesian career diplomat who was the ambassador to Belgium from 1970 to 1972 and to the United Nations in New York from 1972 to 1979. A graduate of the Leiden University, Chaidir served in the foreign ministry since the end of the Indonesian National Revolution, and was appointed to several pivotal postings, culminating with his appointment as the director general of political affairs twice, from 1966 to 1970 and from 1979 to 1980.

== Early life and education ==
Chaidir was born on 19 February 1918 in Ulak Karang, a small locality in Padang, the capital of the-then Dutch East Indies province of West Coast Sumatra, into a family of Minangese aristocrats. His father, Anwar Sani, bore the honorary title of Datuk Bandaharo Hitam. Upon completing elementary and middle school in Padang in 1932 and 1936, respectively, Chaidir completed his high school education at Canisius College, Jakarta in 1939. Although he aspired to become a journalist and a poet at the same time, his father wanted him to become a physician instead and encouraged him to attend the Geneeskundige Hoogeschool te Batavia, which was then the only college-level medical school in the Dutch East Indies. He dropped out after three years and, following the Japanese occupation of the Dutch East Indies, went to the Netherlands. He briefly attended the Dutch naval academy and civil service course (binnenlands bestuur) before deciding to study indology at the Leiden University. He received his doctorandus in 1948.

== Dipomatic career ==
Chaidir returned to Indonesia at the end of the Indonesian National Revolution in 1950 and joined the foreign ministry. Due to his interest in France, the foreign ministry decided to send him as a junior diplomat to the embassy in France with the diplomatic rank of first secretary in 1950 for two years. Chaidir was sent as a representative of the embassy in the Indonesian delegation to the Extraordinary Administrative Radio Conference in Geneva in 1951.

From Paris, Chaidir returned to the foreign ministry with his appointment as chief of the Asia section for three years, from 1952 to 1955. Chaidir became a board member of the foreign ministry's civil servant union (Seklu, serikat sekerdja kementerian luar negeri) in November 1952. Chaidir also began his involvement in politics during this period, with him joining the Republic Party and becoming the party's secretary general and politburo member. He was also nominated by the party for a seat in the constitutional assembly, although he was not elected due to the party's poor electoral result.

In October 1954 Chaidir, alongside with Max Maramis (later ambassador to several countries), visited Indochina countries to observe political situation in the region. A few months later, Indonesia held the Bandung Conference, and Chaidir was appointed as a member of the conference's organizing committee. Several months later, Chaidir was briefly posted to the embassy in Cairo with the diplomatic rank of counsellor before being sent to the embassy in Beijing with the same diplomatic rank. Chaidir accompanied Soong Ching-ling, the wife of the late president of China Sun Yat-sen, during her visit to Indonesia in August 1956.

Chaidir was appointed as the deputy chief of the Asia Pacific directorate of the foreign ministry in September 1957. He was sent abroad to the embassy in New Delhi with the diplomatic rank of minister counsellor from 1960 to 1964. After returning to Jakarta in 1964, in 1965 Chaidir was appointed by foreign minister Adam Malik as the foreign ministry's director of international organization, with responsibilities over, among others, the United Nations. Political researcher Hermawan Sulistyo viewed Chaidir Anwar Sani's appointment, along with other former leftist politicians in the diplomatic service, as a proof of Malik's leftist leanings, although he was in the opposite spectrum of the Communist Party of Indonesia.

=== Director General of Political Affairs, first term ===
After a brief stint as Adam Malik's chef de cabinet, in 1966 Chaidir was appointed as the director general for political affairs, which was the most powerful among other director generals in the foreign ministry. The post was often regarded as the foreign minister's principal deputy, as Chaidir was often entrusted to represent Malik in vital functions. Chaidir played an important role in assisting Malik in establishing ASEAN in 1967 and during Indonesia's chairmanship of the ASEAN Standing Committee in 1968.

In an attempt to resolve the Cambodian Civil War, Indonesia, Japan, and several other nations organized the Jakarta Conference, which brought together countries from all over Asia and Pacific. Chaidir was tasked to organize the conference, with Adam Malik acting as the conference's chair. Indonesia, alongside with Japan and Malaysia, was entrusted by the conference to held consultations with all relevant parties regarding the activation of the ICC and the involvement of the UN, pursuant to the communiqué of the conference. Malik appointed Chaidir as Indonesia's special envoy for the mission, which began in June. Chaidir, alongside with special envoys from Malaysia and Japan, concluded their mission on 3 July 1970 with a report stating that "their main objectives remained unachieved" due to the absence of "encouragement on reactivating the ICC, on an international conference or an UN action".

=== Ambassador to Belgium ===
Following the Jakarta Conference, in September Chaidir was appointed as ambassador to Belgium, with concurrent accreditation to Luxembourg and to the European Economic Community, in a swap with Idrus Nasir Djajadiningrat. He replaced Idrus as ambassador on 10 October 1970 and Idrus replaced him as director general on 30 October. Chaidir presented his credentials to King Baudouin of Belgium on 2 December 1970, Jean, Grand Duke of Luxembourg on 13 January 1971, and president of the European Commission Franco Maria Malfatti on 24 January 1971.

=== Permanent representative to the United Nations ===
By July 1971, Chaidir's name has circulated as Indonesia's permanent representative to the United Nations in New York, replacing former foreign minister Ruslan Abdulgani. After vacating his position in Belgium on 3 February 1972, Chaidir presented his credentials to UN secretary general Kurt Waldheim on 12 February 1972. In February 1973, Chaidir led a four-man mission to inspect the Zambia-Rhodesia border dispute.

Chaidir twice became the president of United Nations Security Council in January 1973 and March 1974, in conjunction with Indonesia's two year membership. As security council president, Chaidir approved a request from Panama's foreign minister Juan Antonio Tack to bring the issue of Panama Canal's negotiation deadlock to the Security Council. After his term ended, Chaidir became the vice chairman of the United Nations Special Committee on Decolonization (the Committee of 24), and briefly became its acting chairman around mid-1975. During his provisional leadership, Chaidir urged the Security Council to take urgent measures to intensify economic sanctions against Rhodesia.

Chaidir also oversaw the establishment of diplomatic relations between Indonesia and Trinidad and Tobago in October 1973, with him being designated with additional accreditation as the country's inaugural ambassador to Trinidad and Tobago. Chaidir presented his credentials to governor general Ellis Clarke on 6 February 1974. Three years later, Chaidir was accorded additional accreditation as Indonesia's inaugural ambassador to the Bahamas after diplomatic relations was established on 5 May 1977.

=== Director General of Political Affairs, second term ===
At the end of 1978, Chaidir was offered another term as the director general of political affairs. Chaidir was initially hesitant as he was planning for retirement and wanted a regeneration for the foreign department's top posts. He eventually accepted the post as there was a strong consensus within the ministry for his return. At his second inauguration ceremony for the position on 5 May 1979, foreign minister Mochtar Kusumaatmadja revealed that he had nominated the much younger Ali Alatas—then the ambassador to the UN in Geneva—for the position, but was overrided with his appointment as secretary by Adam Malik, who had become the vice president. Chaidir was ultimately replaced by Munawir Sjadzali on 30 December 1980, whom he had mentored for six month before his eventual succession. Munawir described the mentoring process as "some sort of understudy". Chaidir was then appointed as one of the five senior advisors to the foreign minister for several years prior to his eventual retirement in 1982. Chaidir continued to play a role in resolving the Cambodian Civil War during his last years in the foreign department, with him becoming acquainted with King Norodom Sihanouk during the process. In July 1987, Chaidir received the Adam Malik Award for his role in diplomacy.

== Personal life ==
Chaidir was married to Ernestine Stella Maria, an Indo woman, in 1949. The couple has six children. Her second daughter, Stella Ramalinda, is married to Bambang Harso Perwiro Yudo, the son of the chief of national intelligence coordination agency Yoga Sugama. Yoga was Chaidir's deputy during his first few years in New York.

Chaidir died on 11 December 1991 in Bogor. His body was interred at the Tanah Kusir public cemetery.
