= Svida Alisjahbana =

Indonesian businesswoman (born 1964)

- Born: 23 December 1964 (age 61); Jakarta, Indonesia
- Education: University of Michigan; Columbia University
- Occupations: Businesswoman, socialite
- Years active: 2001–present
- Employer: Femina Group
- Known for: President Director and CEO, Femina Group
- Notable credit(s): President Director and CEO, Femina Group, Board Member, FIPP (International Federation of The Periodical Press), Chairman, Jakarta Fashion Week, Deputy Chairman, Australia Indonesia Center,
- Board member of: Fega Marikultura; Endeavor; FIPP
- Spouse: Ade Idris
- Children: 2
- Relatives: Sutan Takdir Alisjahbana (grandfather); Betti Alisjahbana (aunt in law); Armida Alisjahbana (cousin in law)

Svida Alisjahbana (born 23 December 1964) is the President Director and CEO of Indonesian Femina Group, a leading women's and lifestyle publishing house in Indonesia, founded by her father, Sofyan Alisjahbana, a position she has held since 2007.

== Early life ==
Alisjahbana is the daughter of Sofyan Alisjahbana and Pia Alisjahbana (née Djajadiningrat). Through Pia, she is related to Achmad Djajadiningrat, the prominent Regent of Serang, then of Batavia, and belongs to the Djajadiningrat family, part of the priyayi or Javanese-Sundanese gentry. Through her father, Sofyan, she is the granddaughter of an influential writer, journalist, poet and Indonesian language experts, Sutan Takdir Alisjahbana. Sofyan is the founder of Femina Group. With his young sister, Mirta Kartohadiprodjo (née Alisjahbana), his wife, Pia and a family friend, Atiek Makarim and Widarti Goenawan founded the first ever women's magazine in Indonesia, called Femina in 1972.

Alisjahbana graduated with a bachelor's degree in Mathematics and Economics from the University of Michigan in 1988, and continued her MBA at Columbia University in New York .

== Career ==
Before the debut of Femina, there were few modern women's magazines in Indonesia. Existing publications were more like guides run by men on how women should serve the family. Alisjahbana's father set up Femina and doubled as a photographer, while her aunt Mirta Kartohadiprodjo was the first editor. The backdrop for the Femina magazines first cover photo was a black sheet thrown over their garage door.

Alisjahbana began her career at the Femina Group as a commercial director, responsible for working on strategic initiatives such as branching out on multi-digital platforms. Today, as chief executive, Alisjahbana is responsible for the Femina Group's three flagship titles – Femina, teen counterpart Gadis, and sister title Dewi. Under her leadership, she launched Femina's Women Entrepreneurship Program and Jakarta Fashion Week. Prior to joining the Femina Group, Alisjahbana worked for GE Capital in Connecticut for five years. Alisjahbana now sits at the chair of the magazine department for the Indonesian Press Association. She has also served as member of the board of management of the International Federation of the Periodical Press (FIPP) since 2008.

== Personal life ==
Alisjahbana is married to Ade Idris. They have two twin sons together, Jyotindra Idris and Girindra Idris.
