= Abdoel Rivai =

Abdoel Rivai (Palembayan, Agam, West Sumatra, August 13, 1871 - Bandung, West Java, October 16, 1937) (EYD: Abdul Rivai) was a physician, scholar, writer, polyglot, and journalist in the Dutch East Indies. He supported the end of Dutch rule there. He distinguished himself as one of the first native Indonesian to earn a doctoral degree. (Note: Rivai earned his doctoral degree on 1908 in Gent University, Belgium through open exam, while Hoesein Djajadiningrat became the first native Indonesian to achieve a doctoral degree via full dissertation on 1913 from Leiden University.)

== Personal life ==
Rivai was of Minangkabau descent. His father was a teacher at a school in Sumatra. He studied at the Javanese Doctor School (STOVIA), before completing his study and received 'the Arts' in University of Amsterdam, Netherlands.

== Career ==
In the Netherlands, Rivai taught Malay language at Berlitz and was actives as a writer. In 1899, he launched his magazine Pewarta Wolanda. Of his controversial writings, the most famous was Demoralisasi Orang Jawa in which he said that Javanese poverty was caused by culture and poor education. After met Clockenner Brousson, he changed Pewarta Wolanda into a twice weekly magazine known as Bendera Wolanda. In 1910, after completed his education, Rivai moved to Jakarta where he sat as editor of Bintang Timoer. In addition to his writings about the Indonesian independence movement, he was elected to the Indonesian Volksraad in 1918.
