= Gadis =

Indonesian teen magazine

- Editor-in-chief & Community: Indri Wulandari
- Categories: Teenage girls
- Frequency: 10 days (1975-2015); Biweekly (1973-1975, 2015-2016); Monthly (2017); Once a few months (2018-2020); Bimonthly (2026-present)
- Circulation: 15,000 (2018)
- Publisher: Femina Group
- Founder: Sofyan Alisjahbana, Pia Alisjahbana
- First issue: 19 November 1973
- Company: PT. Gaya Favorit Press
- Country: Indonesia
- Based in: Jakarta
- Language: Indonesian
- Website: www.gadis.co.id

Gadis (stylized in all caps since 1991; Girl) was an Indonesian weekly magazine for teenage girls. It was first published in 1973 by Femina Group. Gadis focused on fashion and celebrities and offered information about the latest entertainment and feature stories on current issues and events. Its headquarters was in Jakarta. The magazine targeted teenage girls.

Gadis was born following the success of its predecessor Femina magazine. This magazine just obtained a Press Publishing Business License (SIUPP) from the Minister of Information in 1986.

Every year, Gadis holds Gadis Sampul which started in 1987. This event has successfully produced big names in entertainment, such as Krisdayanti, Dian Sastrowardoyo, Maudy Ayunda and others.

In November 2020, Leoni Sihombing, Editor-in-Chief Gadis, announced that the December 2020 issue would be the last regularly scheduled printed issue and that the magazine would now publish its content online. The decision to close the print edition was attributed in part to the COVID-19 pandemic which interfered with distribution of the magazine. In July 2026, Prana Group announced that it would be relaunching its print magazine Gadis.

== Taglines ==
- Majalah Remaja (1973–1982)
- Top di Antara Yang Pop (1982–2017)
- Smart, Stylish & Fabulous (2017–present)

== List of editors-in-chief ==
- Pia Alisjahbana (1973–1992)
- Dewi Dewo (1992–1997)
- Petty S Fatimah (1998–2002)
- Dewi Dewo (2003)
- Didin P Ambardini (2004–2014)
- Leoni Sihombing (2015–2022)
- Indri Wulandari (2023–present)

== Logos ==
From November 1973, there are four different logos for this magazine. The first logo was in use from November 1973 to December 1975, the second logo was in use from January 1976 to December 1990, the third logo was in use from January 1991 to December 2016, and the fourth and current logo was in use from January 2017.

== See also ==
- List of teen magazines
- Femina
