= Djajadiningrat family =

Priyayi family from Indonesia

The Djajadiningrat family was a high-ranking priyayi family in colonial Indonesia, whose members often served as Bupati or Regents (district heads) of Serang in Banten, Dutch East Indies. Noted for their western outlook and loyalty to the Dutch authorities during the colonial period, the family nonetheless fought on both sides of the Indonesian National Revolution (1945–1949).

== History ==
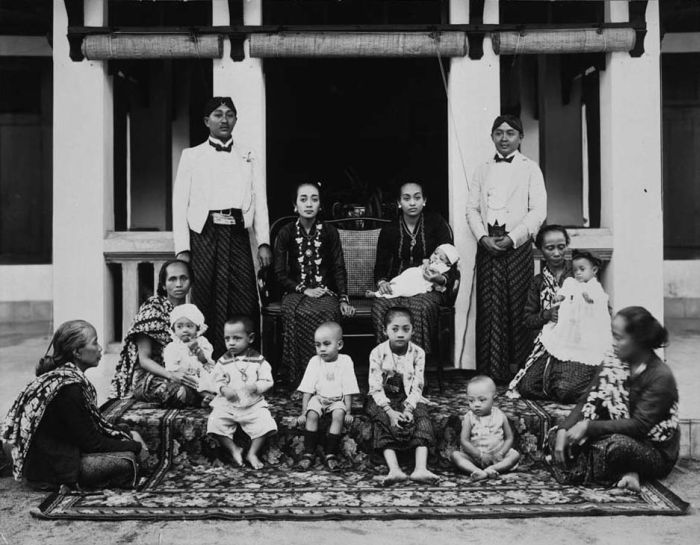
Prince Mangkunegara VII and Hoesein Djajadiningrat with their respective wives, Ratu Timur and Partini, as well as their children (c. 1922).

The family is of Baduy and Bantenese extraction. According to Nina Consuelo Epton, the family's oral history recounts that in the middle of the seventeenth century, their ancestor Astapati ('deadhand'), the one-handed renegade son of a Baduy chieftain, sought shelter at the court of the Sultan of Banten. He was subsequently admitted into the inner circle of the Sultan's court and was allowed to marry one of the Sultan's daughters, thereby becoming the progenitor of the Djajadiningrat family.

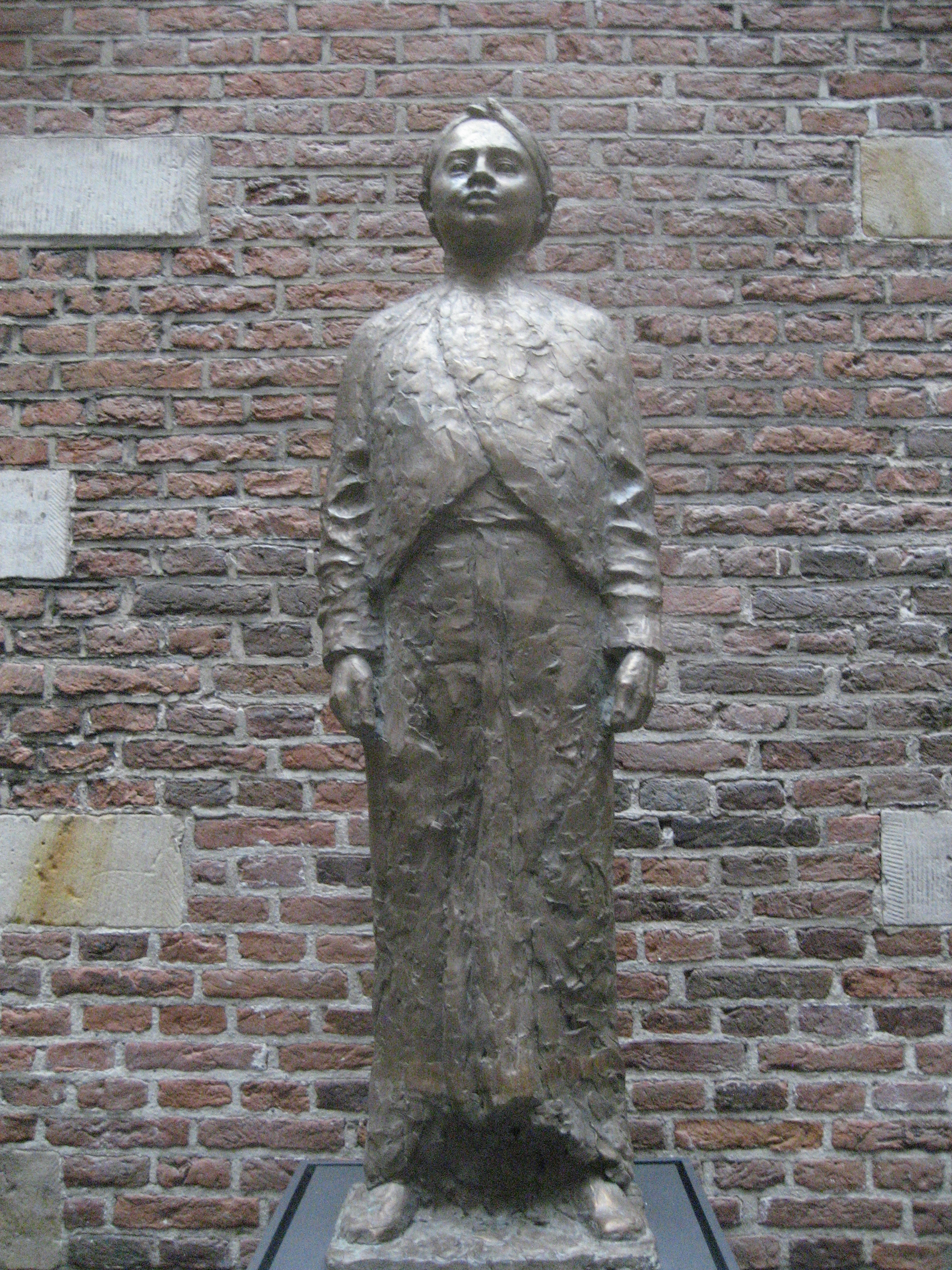
Memorial statue of Hoesein Djajadiningrat in Leiden, Netherlands

Later marriages into the Javanese reigning dynasties further cemented the Djajadiningrat family's hold on power, as was shown by the career of R.T.A. Natadiningrat and his eldest son, R.T. Sutadiningrat, who both ruled in succession as Regents of Serang, in Banten. After an alleged involvement in a peasant revolt, he latter was succeeded by his younger brother, the progressive Raden Toemenggong Bagoes Djajawinata.

In the late nineteenth century, the family benefited from the patronage of the Dutch scholar and educator Snouck Hurgronje. Hurgronje, who believed in coopting the Indonesian elite by giving their children a Dutch education, ensured the admission to the prestigious Koning Willem III School of the brothers Achmad (1877–1943) and Hoesein Djajadiningrat (1886–1960), sons of Raden Bagoes Djajawinata. Achmad, the elder son, went on to succeed his father as Regent of Serang (1901–1924), then of Batavia (1924–1929), and served as a member of both the Volksraad (Indonesia's colonial quasi-parliament) and the Raad van Indië (Council of the Indies). Hoesein, the younger son, completed his doctoral studies at Leiden University in 1913, and became a distinguished scholar of Sundanese, Bantenese, Malay and Islamic studies.

The family, like most other native Sundanese and Bantenese families, originally had no surname; the Dutch-educated Achmad Djajadiningrat adopted the surname 'Djajadiningrat' in the late nineteenth century. Other prominent members of the family include Achmad Djajadiningrat's son, Idrus Nasir Djajadiningrat (1920–1980), and the latter's cousin Maria Ulfah Santoso (1911–1988), both of whom were important figures in the Indonesian Revolution. The media tycoons Pia Alisjahbana and Svida Alisjahbana are the daughter and granddaughter respectively of Hisnat Djajadiningrat, Achmad's daughter from his first wife.

== Notable family members ==
Raden Bagoes Djajawinata, Regent of Serang (1854–1899) with his wife Ratoe Salehah had nine children:

1. Achmad Djajadiningrat (1877–1943), nicknamed 'Uyang', succeeded his father as Regent of Serang (1901–1924), later as Regent of Batavia (1924–1929). He also served as a member of the Volksraad since 1918, stepped down from his regency a few years later when a new law forbade regents to hold multiple offices. In 1929 he served as member of the Raad van Nederlandsch Indie until 1932, when illness prevented him to serve any longer. He was the first to use the surname 'Djajadiningrat', prompting his siblings to adopt the surname. He had several children from multiple wives, some of whom:
  1. Erna Djajadiningrat (1911–1984), first Indonesian woman to receive the Guerilla Star in 1949, in recognition for her wartime service.
  2. Idrus Nasir Djajadiningrat (1920–1980), nicknamed 'Didi', served as navy officer during the Indonesian war for independence, ending his service with the rank of rear admiral. He later served as Indonesian ambassador to Belgium in 1968–1970, later ambassador to Soviet Union in 1976–1980.
  3. Roswita T. Djajadiningrat, nicknamed 'Wiet', author and fighter who participated in combat around southern Malang in 1947. Her diary which were written around this time would be published in Dutch titled 'Herinneringen van een Vrijheidsstrijdster' in 1974. The Indonesian version of this book, 'Pengalamanku Di Daerah Pertempuran Malang Selatan', was published the next year. Fulbright Scholar records show that Roswita--who was at the time an English teacher in Jakarta--arrived June 29th, 1955, for a twelve month learning stay at the University of Michigan and the University of Minnesota. After her studies, in 1957, she joined the teaching staff in Cornell University Far Eastern Department.
  4. Hisnat Djajadiningrat. Her daughter Pia would marry Sofyan Alisjahbana, son of famed author Sutan Takdir Alisjahbana. Together they managed the Femina Group, an Indonesian media and publishing group.
2. Mochammad Djajadiningrat (?–?), nicknamed 'Apun';
3. Hasan Djajadiningrat (1883–1920), nicknamed 'Emong', led the Sarekat Islam organization in Banten until his early death. Previously, he was the vice-president of the Indische Party branch in Banten until 1913, when the party was declared illegal. He was also elected to the Sarekat Islam central committee in 1914, working closely with the moderates such as Tjokroaminoto, in opposition to the radicals in Semarang branch.
4. Chadijah Djajadiningrat (?–?), nicknamed 'Enjah', married to Arya Mohammad Achmad (Regent of Kuningan) and together they had 3 children, one of whom:
  1. Maria Ulfah Santoso (1911-1988), member for the Committee for Preparatory Work for Indonesian Independence, women's right activist, and minister of social affairs in 1946–1947 under prime minister Sjahrir. She was the first Indonesian woman to earn a master's degree in law in 1933 from Leiden University.
5. Hoesein Djajadiningrat (1886–1960), nicknamed 'Ace', distinguished himself as the first Indonesian to achieve a doctoral degree (via dissertation) from Leiden University in 1913. In 1924 he was appointed as a lecturer at Rechtshogeschool te Batavia (Batavia Law School), giving lectures on Islamic law and native languages of Indonesia. During the Japanese occupation of the East Indies, he was appointed as head of Office of Religious Affairs. After Indonesian independence, he taught in Faculty of Letters, University of Indonesia since its foundation in 1950, becoming professor of Islamic and Arabic Studies in 1952. His wife Partini is the eldest daughter of Mangkunegara VII and sister to Mangkunegara VIII of the royal house of Mangkunegara. Together they had six children, one of whom:
  1. Husein Hidayat Djajadiningrat (1928–2010), served in the Indonesian Army in RPKAD (later Kopassus), ending his service with the rank of colonel.
6. Loekman Djajadiningrat (1894–1944), nicknamed 'Ujang', managed to flee Japanese invasion along with Lieutenant Governor-General van Mook and remnants of the colonial government to Australia. After some times serving as a commissioner for Australia and New Zealand, he later appointed to head the education department of the Dutch East Indies Government-in-Exile. He died in Sydney in 1944.
7. Soelasmi Djajadiningrat (?–?), nicknamed 'Yayung';
8. Hilman Djajadiningrat (1896–1963), nicknamed 'Imang', served as Regent of Serang from 1935 to 1945. In 1942 during Japanese occupation, he was appointed the Resident of Banten until 1945, when he returned as Regent of Serang. Later, he would lead pro-Dutch, federalist faction in the State of Pasundan, opposing the pro-Republican faction led by Wiranatakusumah. In 1948 he would serve as the governor of Djakarta Federal District until 1950.
9. Rifqi Djajadiningrat (?–?), nicknamed 'Kikok'.

== Gallery ==
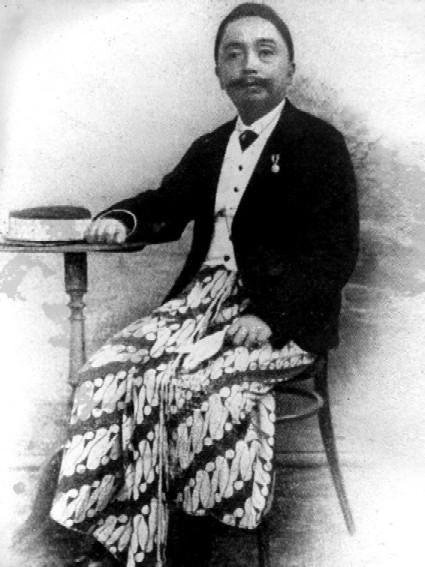
Possible portrait of Bagoes Djajawinata, Regent of Serang

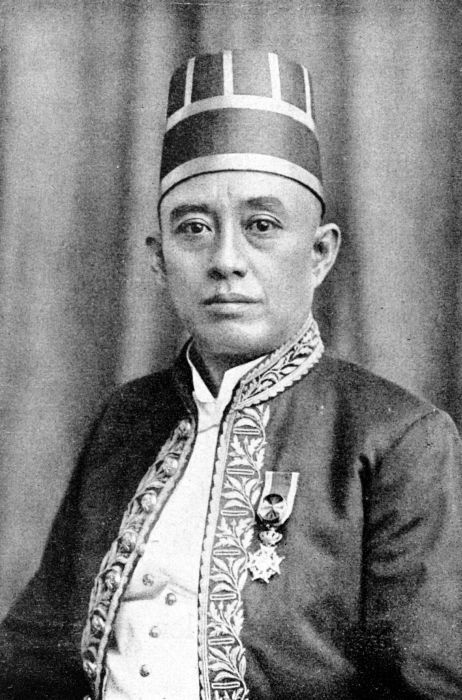
Achmad Djajadiningrat

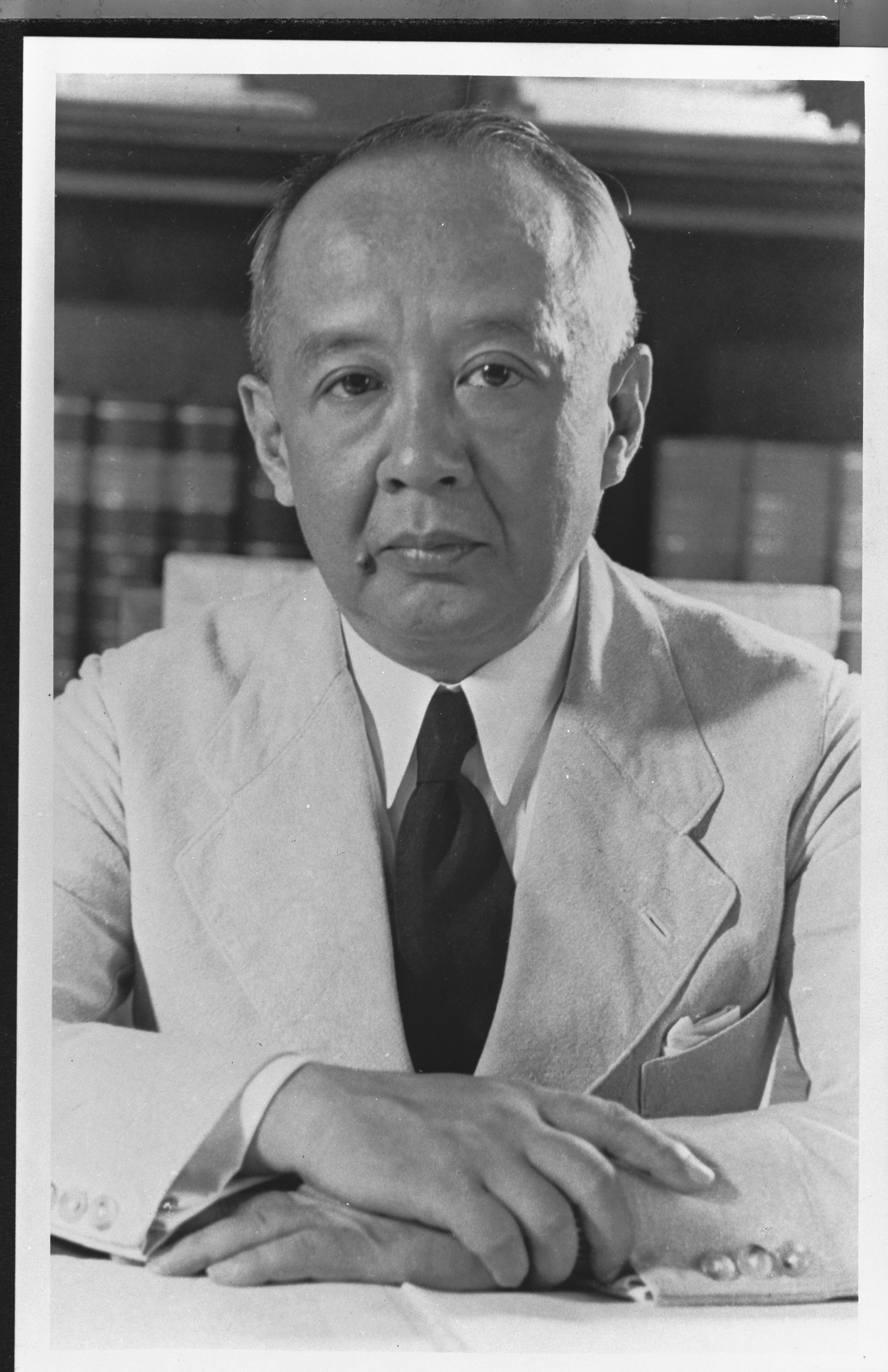
Hoesein Djajadiningrat

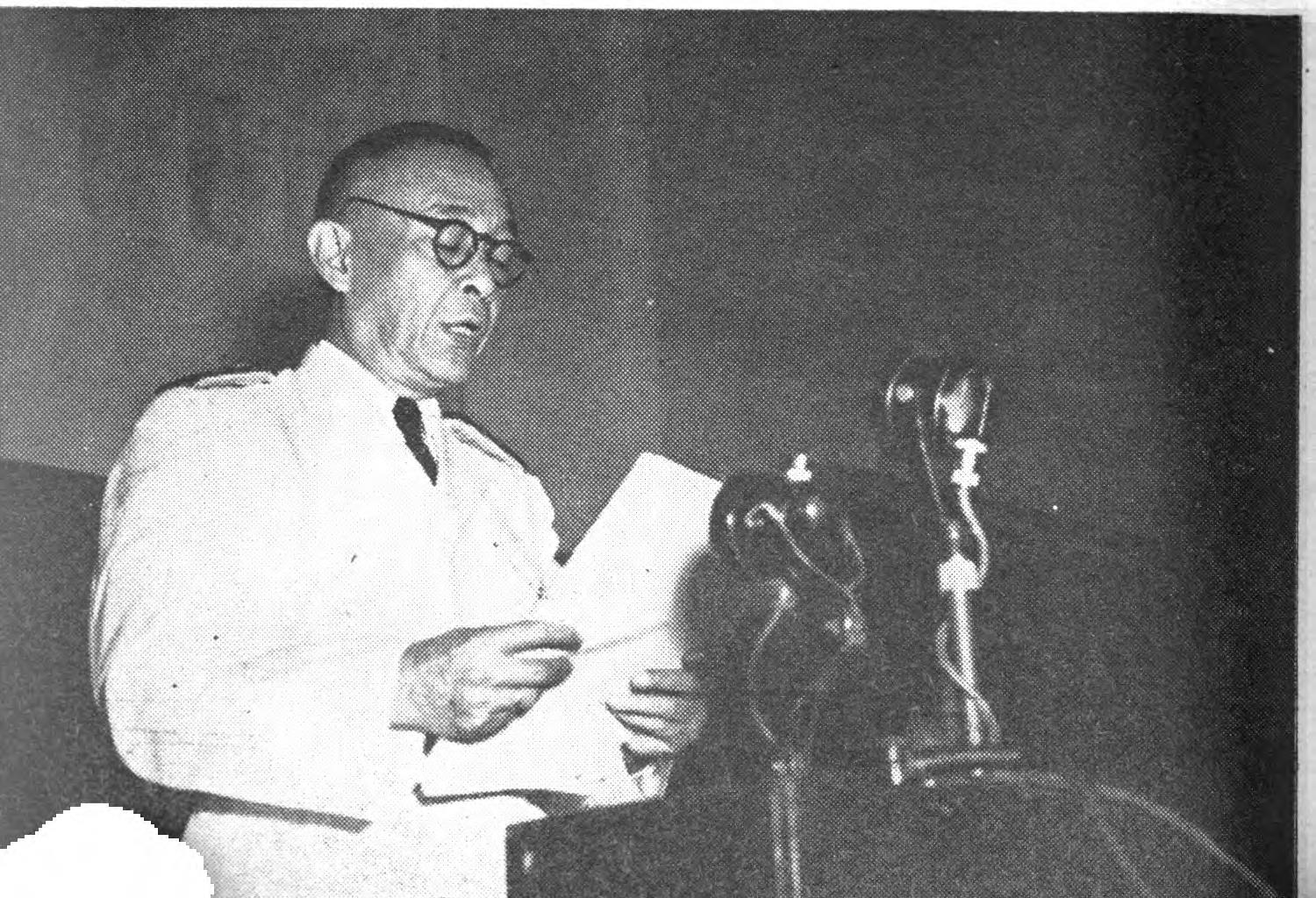
Hilman Djajadiningrat

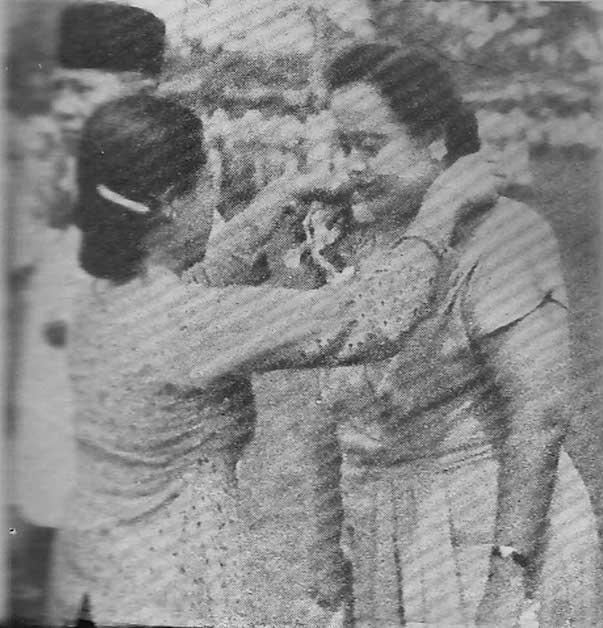
Erna Djajadiningrat

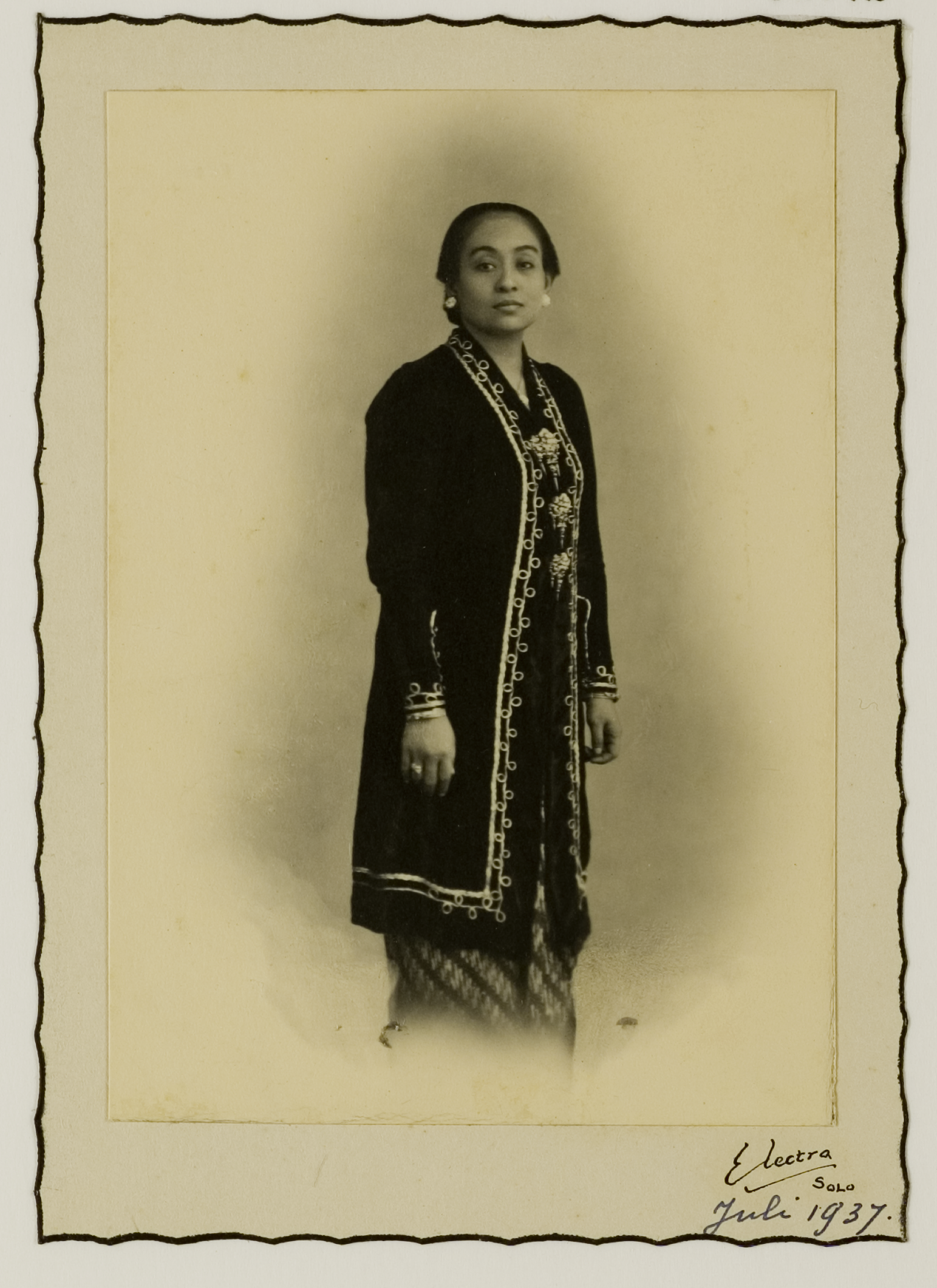
Partini Djajadiningrat, wife of Hoesein and daughter of Mangkunegara VII

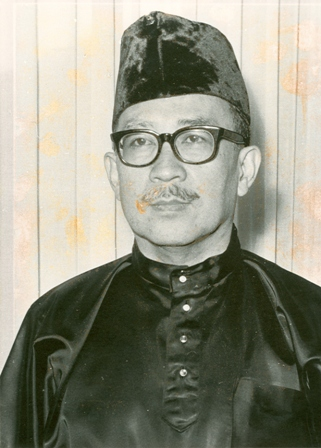
Idrus Nasir Djajadiningrat

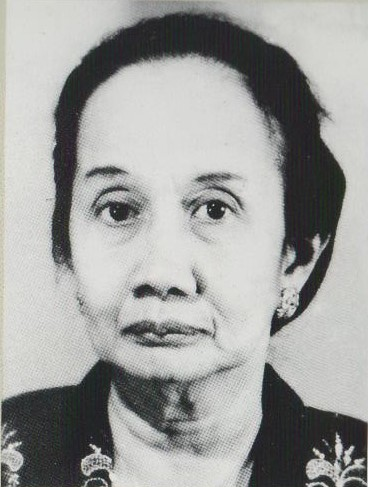
Maria Ulfah Santoso

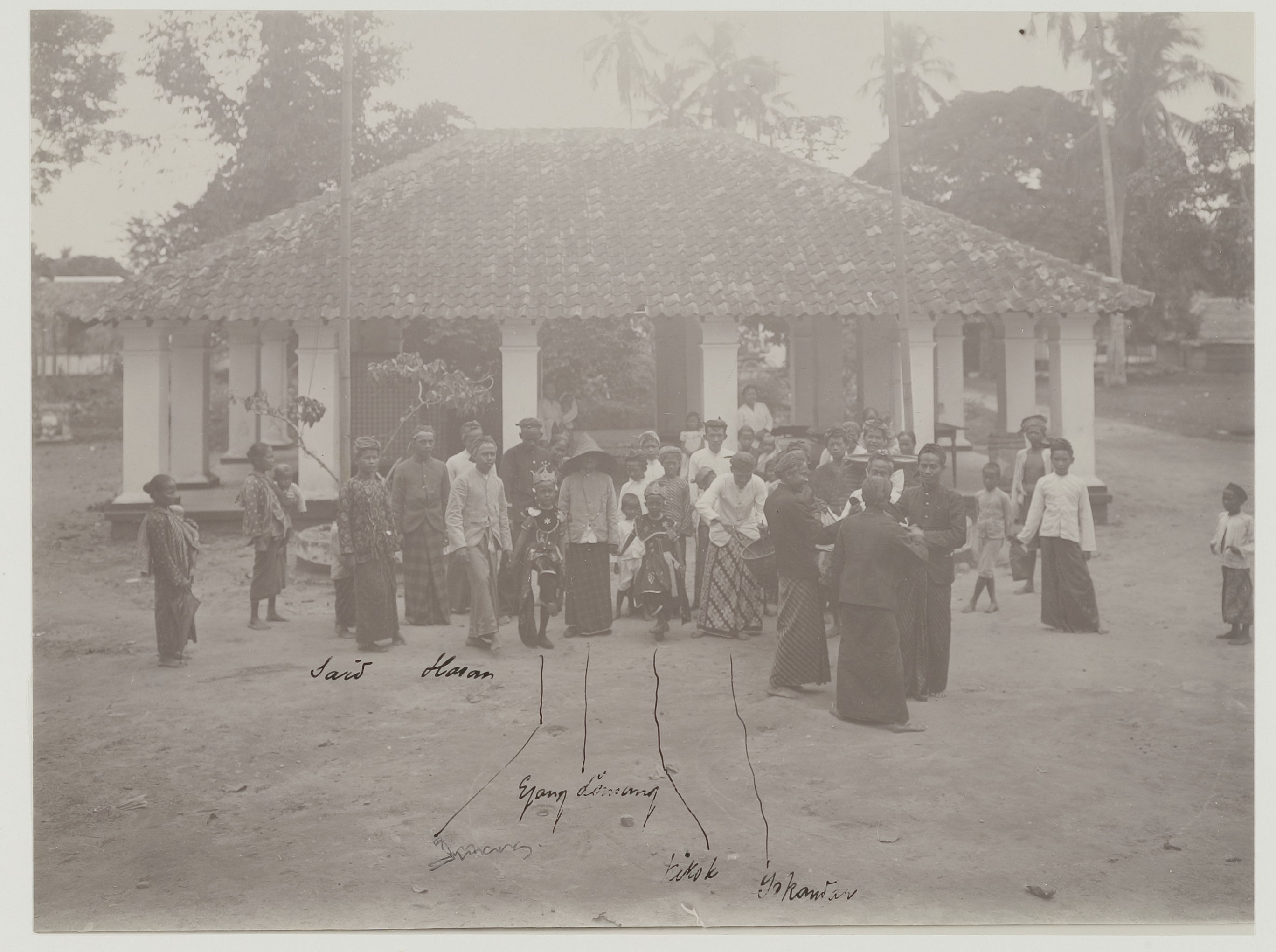
Feast on the occasion of the circumcision of Rifki (Kikok, 7th from left) and Hilman (Imang, 9th from left), sons of the regent of Serang (c. 1900).
