= Betti Alisjahbana =

Indonesian business executive

- Born: Betti Setiastuti; 2 August 1960 (age 65); Bandung, West Java, Indonesia
- Spouse: Mario Alisjahbana
- Relatives: Sutan Takdir Alisjahbana (father in law); Armida Alisjahbana (niece in law); Svida Alisjahbana (niece in law)

Betti Alisjahbana (born Betti Setiastuti; 2 August 1960) is an Indonesian business executive who has held senior positions with companies such as IBM and Garuda Indonesia, and has advised the government on business technology.

== Education ==
Betti graduated from Bandung Institute of Technology in 1984, majoring in architecture. She attended various leadership training workshops in the US, Japan and Australia during her tenure in IBM.

== Career ==
Betti started her career at IBM in 1984 as a management trainee and remained with the company for over 20 years, serving as Country General Manager for IBM Indonesia from 2000 to 2008. She was the first woman in the Asia-Pacific region to hold the position of country general manager for IBM.

After 24 years with IBM, Betti in 2008 started her own business, PT Quantum Business International, a consulting and training firm focusing on leadership development and property development. She also runs a business called QB Youth, which focuses on information technology services and multimedia video production.

She is an Independent Commissioner of PT Anabatic Technologies Tbk and PT Bank OCBC NISP. She was Chairperson of the Bandung Institute of Technology (ITB) over 2014–2019.

Betti has advised the Indonesian government and private sector on business and technology. She was a member of the National Innovation Committee, a think-tank formed by the Indonesian president to provide policy advice to the government (2010–2014). She was also vice-chairperson of the National Research Council (2009–2015), Independent Commissioner of Garuda Indonesia (2012–2015), Independent Commissioner of Sigma Cipta Caraka (TelkomSigma)(September 2010 - July 2017), and Independent Commissioner of Bhinneka.com (December 2015 – August 2017).

Betti is a professional motivational speaker, specializing in leadership topics such as corporate entrepreneurship, talent management, succession planning, women's advancement and innovation.

=== Anti-corruption roles ===
Betti has served six times as a juror for Indonesia's Bung Hatta Anti-Corruption Award (2003, 2004, 2008, 2010, 2013 and 2017). She was chairwoman of the panel of judges when the award was presented to state electricity company PLN president director Nur Pamudji in October 2013. Betti praised Nur for his integrity and his commitment to end corruption, collusion and nepotism in PLN. Less than two months later, Nur tendered his resignation from PLN after being questioned over a 2007-2009 corruption case. In July 2020, Nur was sentenced to six years in jail for a 2010 corruption case at PLN.

In 2015, President Joko Widodo appointed Betti and eight other women to a committee to select candidates for five commissioner positions of the Corruption Eradication Commission. As spokesperson for the selection committee, Betti urged the public not to publicly criticize any of the candidates, claiming the committee could be held responsible if candidates complained to police because they felt offended by criticism.

== Recognition & Awards ==
- 17 August 2013: Satyalancana Wira Karya from the President of Indonesia, for her significant contribution to the advancement of information technology in Indonesia.
- 2 March 2013: Ganesa Wira Adi Utama from the Rector of Bandung Institute of Technology.
- 21 April 2013: Indi Women Award, Kartini 2.0 from PT Telkom Indonesia, for her role in advancing information technology in Indonesia.
- 21 April 2008: 100 Most Inspirational Women from Kartini magazine;
- 2007 CEO Idaman from Warta Ekonomi Magazine.
- IBM Country General Manager Excellence Award 2000.

== Personal life ==
In 1985, at age 25, Betti married Mario Alisjahbana, the son of novelist Sutan Takdir Alisjahbana. They have two children: Aslan and Nadia. Mario, who is involved in printing, in 2012 was a defendant in a case involving a disputed debt of AUS$2.28 million.
