= Petty S. Fatimah =

Indonesian journalist

Petty Siti Fatimah is an Indonesian journalist who, since 2003, has served as editor-in-chief of the Indonesian women's magazine Femina.

== Early life and education ==
Petty S. Fatimah grew up in Bandung, in West Java, Indonesia. She initially sought to be a pharmacist, enrolling in the Bandung Institute of Technology, but after failing to qualify she shifted to studying communications.

Fatimah obtained a bachelor's in communications from Padjadjaran University. Later, in 2008, she earned a master's in communications management from the University of Indonesia.

== Career ==
While in college, in the late 1980s, Fatimah became an announcer for OZ Radio, which started her journalism career. She also wrote for a local newspaper in Bandung.

After graduation, she settled in Jakarta, where, in 1991, she was hired to work at Gadis, a teen magazine affiliated with the women's magazine Femina. In 1998, she was named Gadis' editor in chief. Then, in 2003, she was appointed editor in chief of Femina. In 2010, she was given the additional role of Femina's chief community officer.

In addition to running the magazine, Fatimah has also hosted the show "Confessions of a Workaholic" on the magazine's radio network. She has worked to build communities for women entrepreneurs and leaders via the magazine.
