= Farah Quinn =

Indonesian chef, restaurateur and media personality (born 1980)

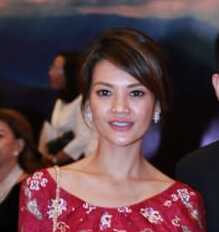
- Born: Farah Farhanah; 8 April 1980 (age 46); Bandung, Indonesia
- Occupations: Chef, celebrity chef
- Years active: 2008 – now
- Spouse: Dr. Charles Jost
- Children: Armand Fauzan Quinn and Amaira Jost
- Website: http://www.farahquinn.com

Farah Farhanah is an Indonesian celebrity chef, restaurateur and media personality, known for her culinary television shows. She was awarded the 2013 Panasonic Gobel Award as the Best Presenter for hobby and lifestyle television program.

== Early life ==
Quinn was born on 8 April 1980 in Bandung and spent her childhood in Palembang, Sumatera.

She attended a high school in Pittsburgh, Pennsylvania, and then attended the Indiana University of Pennsylvania to receive a bachelor's degree in Finance. Her love for food took over and she changed her field of study to culinary arts and completed a degree in pastry arts from Pennsylvania Culinary Institute.

== Personal life ==
She is married to Dr. Charles Jost, an interventional cardiologist and CEO. They currently reside in the U.S., where they are raising their children.

== Career ==
After graduation, Farah moved to Phoenix, Arizona, where she took a position in the pastry kitchen at the Arizona Biltmore Hotel. Meanwhile, she continued studying her passion by attending classes at World Pastry Championships and taking opportunities to study under pastry chefs Ewald Notter and Colette Peters.

In 2003, she was invited to the G8 summit at Sea Island, Georgia, where she created specialty desserts for the First Lady of the United States, Laura Bush, and other world delegates under the guidance of the celebrity chef James Mullaney.

She opened a restaurant, Camus, with her former husband Carson Quinn in Phoenix, Arizona, in 2003.

In 2013, Farah created a dish for Air Asia, which was made available on all Air Asia's Indonesia flights. Air Asia approached her with the idea of working together for the creation of in-flight meals which then become an opportunity for her to come up with dishes that celebrate her style of cooking and showcase the best of Indonesian cuisine. One of the dishes was Nasi minyak Palembang, a dish that is usually served during special occasions in Southern Sumatra where Farah grew up.

=== Television shows ===
In late 2008, she decided to go back to Indonesia and began her career there as a TV personality and host for a culinary-related program. Her first cooking show, called Ala Chef, was broadcast nationwide on Trans TV and internationally on the Asian Food Channel. The program is about her exploring the local cuisine of Indonesia as she performs simple, uncomplicated styles of cooking using fresh ingredients that allows her to give a unique and modern twist to traditional dishes while staying true to their origins and history.

She made her first fully international appearance on Asian Food Channel. The show is based around underprivileged youths from six different countries in Asia who are offered an opportunity to transform their lives by learning invaluable skills needed in the kitchen. The show was broadcast towards the end of 2012 in Singapore, Hong Kong, Indonesia, Malaysia, Brunei, Philippines, Mongolia, South Korea and Thailand.

=== Advertising ===
Along with her career and growing popularity, Quinn took on the role of brand ambassador for a number of products in the region. Some of these products are culinary in nature, but also include travel, lifestyle and telecommunications.

In 2010, Quinn was named brand ambassador for Tupperware's premium cookware, the Tchef Series. In the same year, she also attended Carl's Jr. restaurants launching as its brand ambassador. The Government of New Zealand appointed Quinn as the Luxury New Zealand website travel ambassador in 2012.

== Appearances ==
Other than her own TV show, she also appeared as a guest star and has endorsed several products in TV commercial advertisements. Some popular magazines and newspapers also published her story of success and invited her to some off-air shows.

== Awards ==
- Sexiest Female Celebrity, awarded by a local TV program on 16 October 2011.
- Best presenter for hobby and lifestyle, Panasonic Gobel Award 2013
