= Maria Ulfah Santoso =

Indonesian politician and activist (1911–1988)

Mr. Hajjah Maria Ulfah Santoso
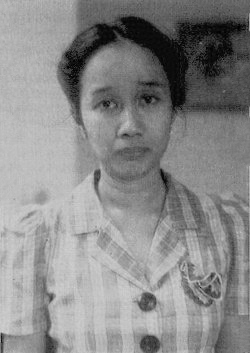
- Santoso in 1947

3rd Minister of Social Affairs
- In office 12 March 1946 – 26 June 1947
- Prime Minister: Sutan Sjahrir
- Preceded by: Sudarsono Mangunadikusumo
- Succeeded by: Soeparjo

Personal details
- Born: 18 August 1911 Serang, Dutch East Indies
- Died: 15 April 1988 (aged 76) Jakarta, Indonesia
- Spouses: R. Santoso Wirodihardjo (m. 1938–1946) Soebadio Sastrosatomo (m. 1964–1988)
- Children: 1 (adopted)
- Education: Leiden University (Mr.)
- Occupation: Politician; activist

Maria Ulfah Soebadio Sastrosatomo (18 August 1911 – 15 April 1988), better known by her first married name Maria Ulfah Santoso, was an Indonesian politician and women's rights activist who served as Minister of Social Affairs under Prime Minister Sutan Sjahrir. She was the first Indonesian woman to receive a degree in law as well as the first female Indonesian cabinet member. Santoso, the daughter of a politician, became interested in women's rights after seeing numerous injustices in her youth. Despite pressure to become a doctor, she graduated with a degree in law from Leiden University in 1933; while in the Netherlands she also became involved in the Indonesian nationalist movement.

Upon returning to the Dutch East Indies, Santoso began teaching and working towards marriage reform. She was a member of the Committee for Preparatory Work for Indonesian Independence, and later became the social minister from March 1946 to June 1947. After her term, she continued to work with the government in various capacities. Chosen for the cabinet post in part for her emancipatory activities, Santoso paved the way for other female cabinet members, including S. K. Trimurti in 1947. She received several awards from the Indonesian government for her activities.

== Early life and activism ==
Born into the prominent Djajadiningrat family in Serang, Bantam Residency, Dutch East Indies on 18 August 1911, Santoso was the daughter of R.A.A. Mohammad Achmad and his wife R.A. Hadidjah Djajadiningrat. The youngest of three children, Santoso spent her childhood in Kuningan, where her father served as regent. One day, an ill aunt came over looking for help. However, upon receiving a letter from her husband, the aunt returned home and died not long after. Santoso later described this incident as inspiring her to work for women's rights. While Santoso was still in elementary school, her father sent her to Batavia (modern day Jakarta) to live with a Dutch family at Willemslaan Elementary School; while in Batavia she completed her middle schooling at Koning Willem III Middle School. While in Batavia, Santoso observed further women's issues, such as how women were devastated when their husbands took second wives or divorced them without cause. Despite her father wanting her to be a doctor, Santoso insisted on going into law.

Santoso went to The Hague, in the Netherlands, in 1929 with her father, who was furthering his studies. Santoso then enrolled at Leiden University in Leiden, from which she graduated in 1933 with a Meester in de Rechten (Master of Laws) degree; this made her the first Indonesian woman to earn a law degree. During her studies, she became involved with the Indonesian nationalist movement and its leaders, including Mohammad Hatta and Sutan Sjahrir. In 1934, Santoso returned to Batavia and took a teaching job at the Muhammadiyah-run teacher's college there, refusing a position in the colonial government to do so. While teaching, she continued to be active in the nationalist movement, helping Adam Malik to establish the news agency Antara. In February 1938 she married R. Santoso Wirodihardjo. That same year, she led a congress dealing with marriage reform, to better protect the rights of women; the reforms passed in 1941. Santoso also worked to promote women's literacy through sewing groups; women who came to study sewing would be invited to learn to read and about marriage rights and child-rearing.

== Political career ==
After the Japanese occupied Indonesia in 1942, Santoso left her work as a teacher and found employment as legal assistant to Soepomo, who later became the country's first minister of justice. In 1945, with the Japanese preparing to withdraw from the Indies and the proclamation of independence looming, Santoso became a member of the Committee for Preparatory Work for Indonesian Independence. On 12 March 1946, Santoso became the first ever female cabinet member when she was selected as services minister in the Second Sjahrir Cabinet. Working quickly and efficiently, she found herself organising the return of internees from Japanese-run camps. She was kept on through the Third Sjahrir Cabinet, but when it dissolved on 26 June 1947, Santoso refused another term as social minister. She instead chose to work as head of prime minister Amir Sjarifuddin's secretariat. She kept this position into the First Hatta Cabinet. During Operation Kraai, a Dutch-led offensive on the city of Yogyakarta on 19 December 1948, her husband was killed outside Maguwo.

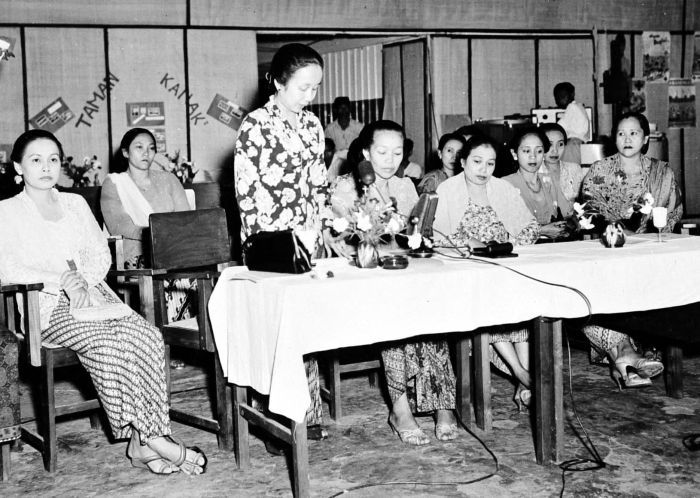
Santoso speaking at the National Women's Congress in 1950

In 1949, Santoso was part of a committee tasked with preparing a marriage bill "in keeping with the spirit of modern times". Throughout the 1950s, Santoso kept herself busy with numerous social works. From 1950 until 1961 she served as the head of Indonesia's film censorship bureau, a position which she held reluctantly. She also served as the head of the Indonesian Women's Congress (Kowani) from 1950 to 1961.

Santoso married again, this time to Indonesian Socialist Party figure Soebadio Sastrosatomo, on 10 January 1964. The couple were often separated when Sastrosatomo was imprisoned for his political activities, but they were able to go on the hajj together. During the 1960s Santoso continued to be politically active, serving in the State Secretariat from 1962 to 1967 and on the State Advisory Council from 1967 to 1972. While with Sastrosatomo, she adopted a child.

In her final years, Santoso and Sastrosatomo lived off of their pensions in Jakarta; in her obituary, Tempo magazine reported that the pension was barely enough for day-to-day expenses. She died at 2:15 am on 15 April 1988, after being treated at Gatot Subroto Air Force Hospital in Jakarta for more than a month. She was buried at Kalibata Heroes' Cemetery.

== Legacy ==
Soebadio Sastrosatomo wrote that Santoso's selection as social minister was important for several reasons. Firstly, her selection showed that the government truly respected women's contributions to the nationalist movement. Secondly, it was a way for Sjahrir to show that the Indonesian people were committed to the needs of their people, by having a woman deal with women's issues. After Santoso, other women have held government positions. The second female Indonesian minister, S. K. Trimurti, served as minister of labour from 1947 to 1948. In 2001, Megawati Sukarnoputri became the first female president of Indonesia. Santoso received several awards from the Indonesian government, including the Satya Lencana Karya Satya (Level II) (Medal of Great Work), Satya Lencana Peringatan Perjuangan Kemerdekaan (Medal in Memory of Freedom Fighting), and Bintang Mahaputra Utama (Third Class) (Mahaputra Star). The Bintang Mahaputra is Indonesia's highest award for civilians.
