= Achmad Djajadiningrat =

Kandjeng Pangeran Aria Adipati Achmad Djajadiningrat
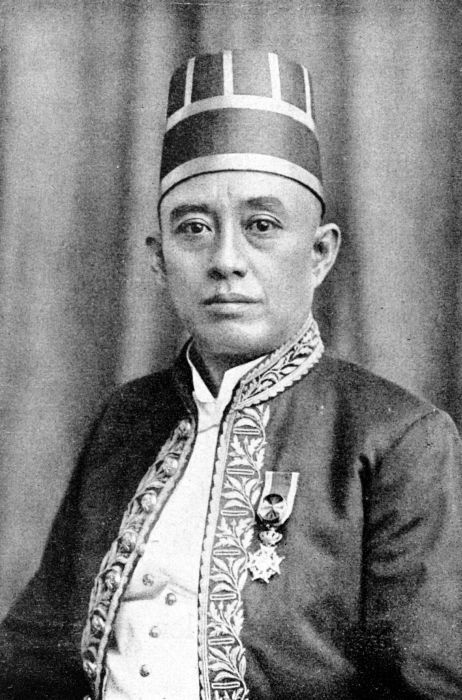
- Born: August 16, 1877; Pandeglang, Dutch East Indies
- Died: December 22, 1943 (aged 66); Purwakarta, Japanese-occupied East Indies
- Resting place: Purwakarta
- Occupation: Official
- Years active: 1901–1929
- Title: Regent of Serang (1901–1924), Regent of Batavia (1924–1929)
- Spouses: Raden Ajeng Lenggang Kencana (m. 1901–1910); Raden Ajeng Suwitaningrat Sastradipura (m. 1910–1943)
- Children: Erna Djajadiningrat; Idrus Nasir Djajadiningrat
- Parent(s): Raden Bagus Djajawinata (father); Ratu Salehah (mother)
- Relatives: Hilman Djajadiningrat (brother), Hasan Djajadiningrat (brother)

Kandjeng Pangeran Aria Adipati Achmad Djajadiningrat (EYD is Achmad Jayadiningrat; August 16, 1877 in Pandeglang – December 22, 1943 in Purwakarta) was a prominent colonial Indonesian bureaucrat who served as Regent of Serang (1901–1924), and subsequently of Batavia (1924–1929). He was also a member of the Volksraad (or colonial legislature) of the Dutch East Indies.

== History ==
He was born into the prominent Djajadiningrat family in Kabayan village, Pandeglang on August 16, 1877, and died in Purwakarta on December 22, 1943. His father, Raden Bagus Djajawinata, was a forward-thinking Regent of Serang, while his grandfather, Raden Adipati Aria Natadiningrat, served as Regent of Pandeglang. His mother was Ratu Salehah, originally from Cipete, Serang. Djajadiningrat served as Regent of Serang from 1901 until 1924, and was then appointed to the newly created post of Regent of Batavia, in office from 1924 until 1929. He also served as a member of the Volkraad quasi-legislature and of the Council of the Indies (an advisory body to the Dutch Empire in Indonesia).

The Djajadiningrat family counted among its members some influential players during the Indonesian national movement. Djajadiningrat's younger brother, Hoessein Djajadiningrat, was a pioneering academic and scholar in Indonesia, as well as the first native Indonesian to earn a doctorate (in Leiden) and professorship.

Achmad Djajadiningrat was also active in some early nationalist organizations, such as in Jamiat Kheir as an early member.

== Legacy ==
In 1936 he authored a book of his memoirs titled Herinneringen van Pangeran Aria Achmad Djajadiningrat which contains over 37 years of his experience in public services, among others, as regent of Serang (1901–1927), regent of Batavia, Volksraad member, member of the Raad van Indie, and representative of the Dutch East Indies as the Dutch delegation at the League of Nations in Geneva, Switzerland.

In 1936 his autobiography, Herinneringen van Pangeran Aria Achmad Djajadiningrat, was published in Amsterdam and Batavia by Kolff & Co. In the same year, this book was translated into Indonesian and published by Kolff and Balai Pustaka under the title "Kenang-Kenangan Achmad Djajadiningrat, 1877-1943". It was republished in 1996 by Paguyuban Keturunan P.A. Achmad Djajadiningrat with the new standardized Indonesian spelling.
