= Yoga Sugama =

Indonesian diplomat (1925–2003)

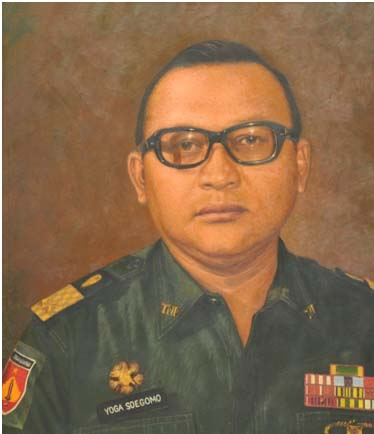
- General Yoga Sugama

Personal details
- Born: 12 May 1925 Tegal, Dutch East Indies
- Died: 23 April 2003 (aged 77) Jakarta, Indonesia

Military service
- Allegiance: Indonesia
- Branch/service: Indonesian Army
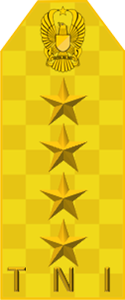
- Rank: General

General (Ret.) Yoga Sugama (12 May 1925 – 23 April 2003) was the head of Bakin, doubling as KasKopkamtib (1980–1989). He also served as the deputy permanent representative of Indonesia to the United Nations from 1971 to 1974. Yoga died in Jakarta Pondok Indah Hospital, and his remains were interred in TMP Kalibata.

== Honours ==
=== National Honours ===
- Star of Mahaputera, 2nd Class (Indonesian: Bintang Mahaputera Adipradana) (1983)

=== Foreign Honours ===
- Japan :
  - Order of the Sacred Treasure 1st Class
- Malaysia :
  - Honorary Commander of the Order of Loyalty to the Crown of Malaysia
- Republic of China :
  - Grand Cordon of the Order of Chiang Chung-Cheng
- South Korea :
  - Tong-Il of the Order of National Security Merit
- Thailand :
  - Knight Grand Cross of the Most Noble Order of the Crown of Thailand (1989)
