= Adipati Soejono =

Javanese-Dutch politician (1886–1943)

Pangeran Raden Adipati Ario Soejono
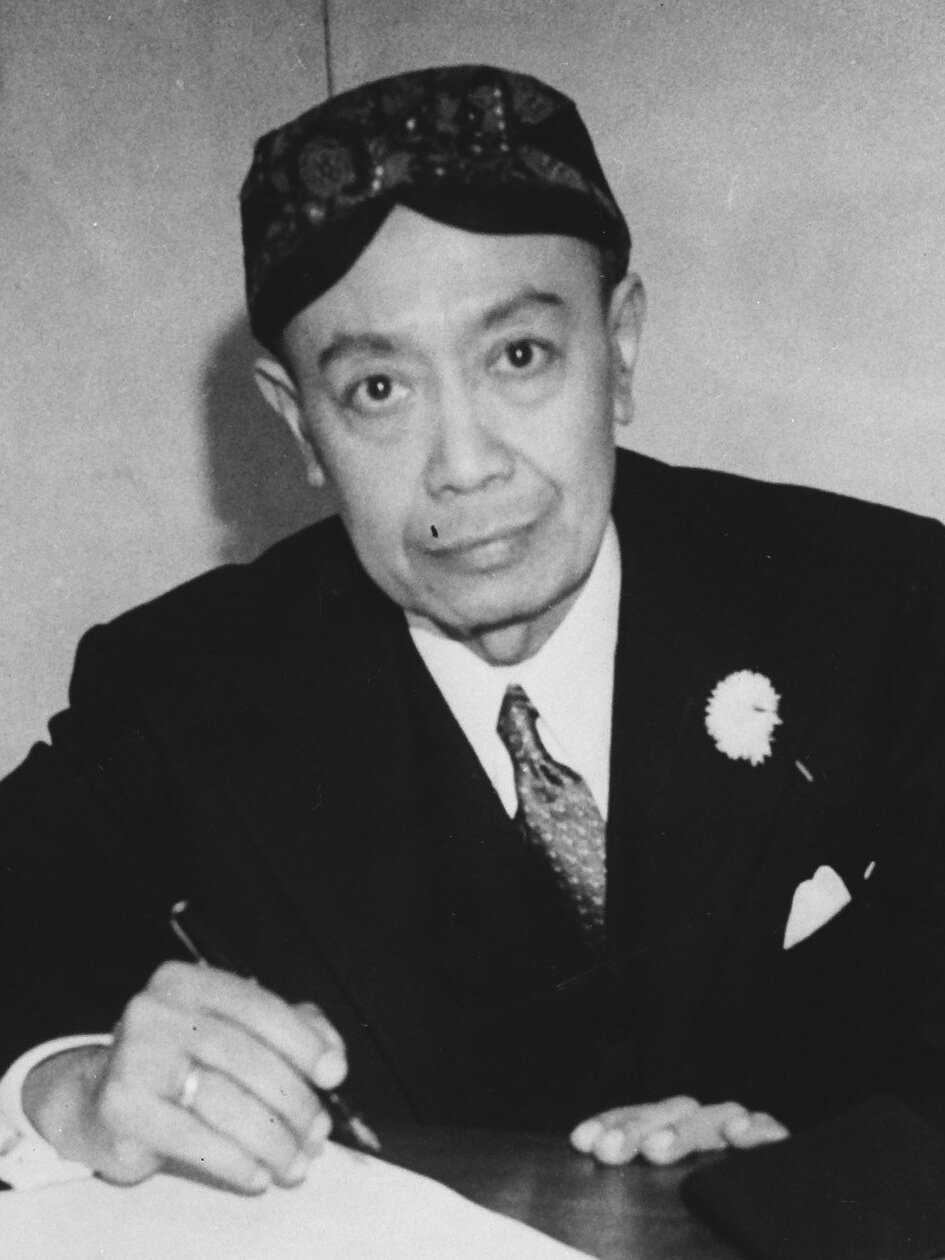

Minister without portfolio
- In office 9 June 1942 – 5 January 1943
- Cabinet: Gerbrandy II
- Department: Ministry of the Colonies

Member of the Council of the Dutch East Indies
- In office 29 February 1940 – 1942
- Governor-General: Alidius Tjarda van Starkenborgh Stachouwer
- Preceded by: Hoesein Djajadiningrat

Member of the Volksraad
- In office 15 September 1922 – 14 November 1934
- Preceded by: Mohamad Zain
- Succeeded by: Mohamad Notoadisoerjo
- In office 5 August 1920 – 17 May 1921
- Preceded by: Aboekassan Atmodirono

Personal details
- Born: 31 March 1886 Tulungagung, Dutch East Indies (present-day Indonesia)
- Died: 5 January 1943 (aged 56) London, United Kingdom
- Resting place: Muslim Burial Ground, Woking, United Kingdom
- Spouse: Raden Ajoe Adipati Ario Soejono (m. 1915)
- Children: 4, including Irawan Soejono
- Occupation: Regent; civil servant; politician

Pangeran Raden Adipati Ario Soejono (31 March 1886 – 5 January 1943) was a Javanese-Dutch civil servant and politician, who briefly served as minister without portfolio in the Dutch government-in-exile from 1942 until his death in 1943. He is recognised as the only Indonesian person and first Muslim to have held a ministerial position in the cabinet of the Netherlands.

== Early life and education ==
Soejono was born on 31 March 1886 in Tulungagung, East Java into a Javanese regent family. His father was a wedono, or district head. Soejono attended the Hogere Burgerschool (HBS) in Surabaya and later passed the senior civil servants' exam (grootambtenaarsexamen) in Batavia, a requirement for entering the Dutch East Indies civil service.

== Career ==
=== Early career and Volksraad membership ===
At the age of 22, Soejono began his career in the domestic administration of the Dutch East Indies. He later became regent of Pasuruan. During his tenure as regent, Soejono was appointed to the Volksraad on 5 August 1920, following the death of Aboekassan Atmodirono. He did not return to the Volksraad after the 1921 election, in which he ran as a candidate for the conservative liberal Freethinkers League (NIVB). However, he rejoined the body on 15 September 1922 when he was appointed to fill a mid-term vacancy. Soejono subsequently secured re-election in the 1924, 1927 and 1931 elections, and also served as a member of the assembly's College of Delegates.

In 1930, Soejono was sent on a one-year study assignment to the Netherlands. During his stay in Europe, he joined the Netherlands' delegation to the International Labour Organization conference in Geneva, representing the Dutch East Indies in negotiations on the abolition of forced labour. In November 1934, Soejono left the Volksraad and relocated to The Hague, where he was appointed to serve on the International Rubber Regulation Committee on behalf of the Ministry of the Colonies.

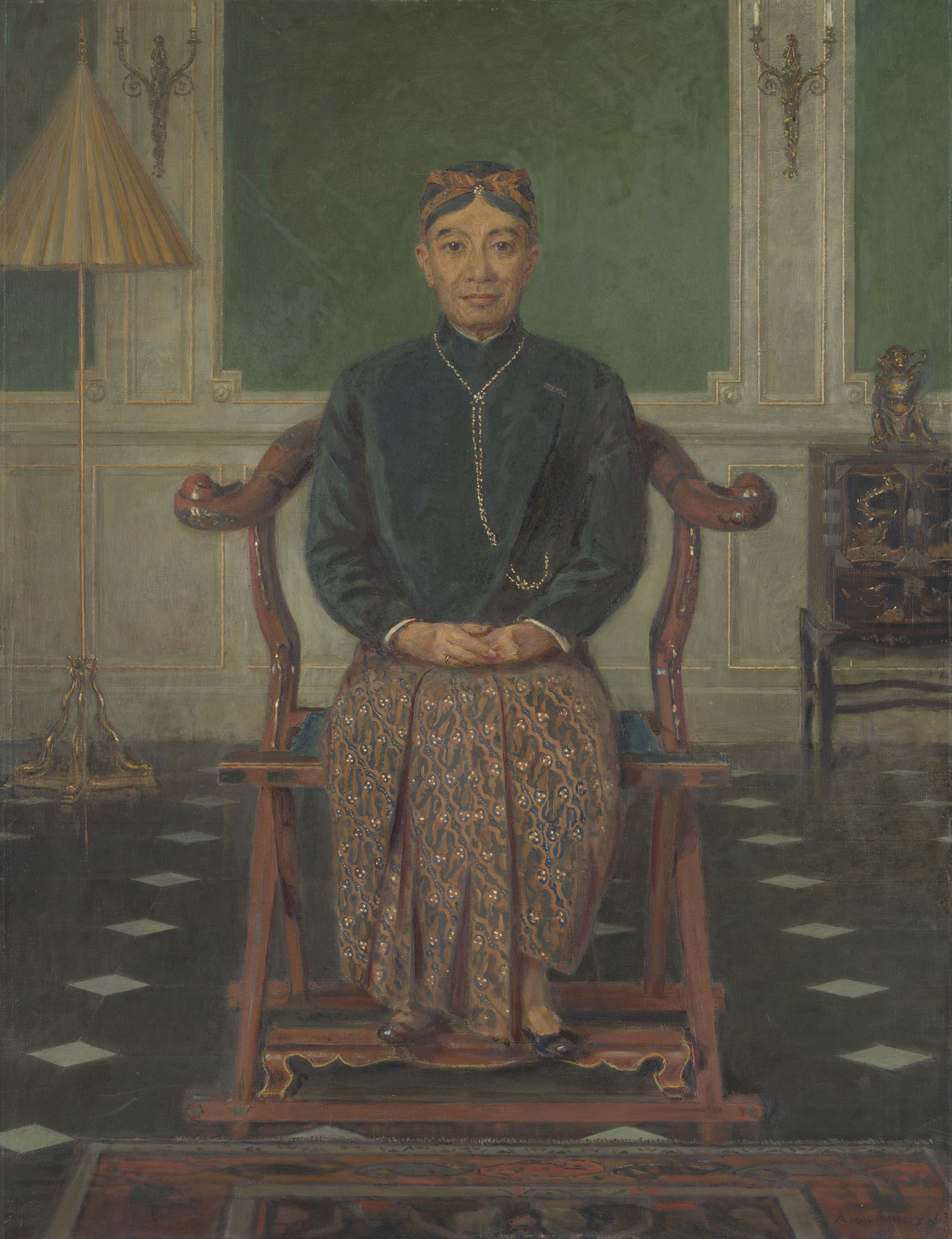
Portrait of Soejono by Anton van Anrooy

=== Advisory roles and appointment as minister ===
In early 1940, Soejono returned to Java and succeeded Hoesein Djajadiningrat as a member of the Council of the Dutch East Indies. From October 1940, he took part in the committee for the revision of the Dutch East Indies' electoral system. Shortly before the Japanese invasion in 1942, he fled to Australia, along with Huib van Mook. When Van Mook was appointed as Minister of the Colonies in the exiled second Gerbrandy cabinet in London, Soejono served as his senior adviser.

Van Mook, who supported granting greater autonomy to the Dutch East Indies, proposed to promote Soejono to the position of minister without portfolio within the cabinet. This proposal was backed by Foreign Minister Eelco van Kleffens, who viewed the appointment as a way to signal to American anti-colonial critics that the Dutch regarded Indonesians as political equals. Although Queen Wilhelmina had initially been reluctant to appoint a non-citizen into the Dutch cabinet, Soejono was sworn in on 9 June 1942. He was welcomed into the Council of Ministers by Prime Minister Pieter Sjoerds Gerbrandy, who described the inclusion of the first Indonesian member of government as a "historic moment".

=== Stance on post-war colonial policy ===
Soejono advised Queen Wilhelmina on the future constitutional relationship between the Netherlands and the Dutch East Indies after the Second World War. In October 1942, he prepared two policy briefs explaining that many Indonesians would not accept a return to colonial rule and that meaningful concessions were necessary to ensure a voluntary constitutional relationship. Central to his position was the need for the Netherlands to respect the Dutch East Indies' right to self-determination. During cabinet meetings that month, he pressed his colleagues to adopt this view, but his appeals ultimately failed to gain support.

Nonetheless, in a Radio Oranje speech delivered by Queen Wilhelmina on 7 December 1942, the government sought to give an opening for possible changes to the status of the Dutch East Indies after the war:

"I am guided by the awareness that no political unity or bond can endure unless it is supported by the voluntary acceptance and loyalty of the overwhelming majority of the population. I know that the Netherlands will feel more strongly than ever its responsibility for the further emancipation of the Indonesian people, and I am convinced that the Indonesians will regard the slowly developed partnership between the various peoples of the Kingdom as the best guarantee for preserving and fulfilling their freedom."

== Personal life and death ==
In 1915, Soejono married a regent's daughter from Purwodadi, who was known by the courtesy titles Raden Ajoe Adipati Ario Soejono (24 June 1899 – 15 August 1980). The couple had four children.

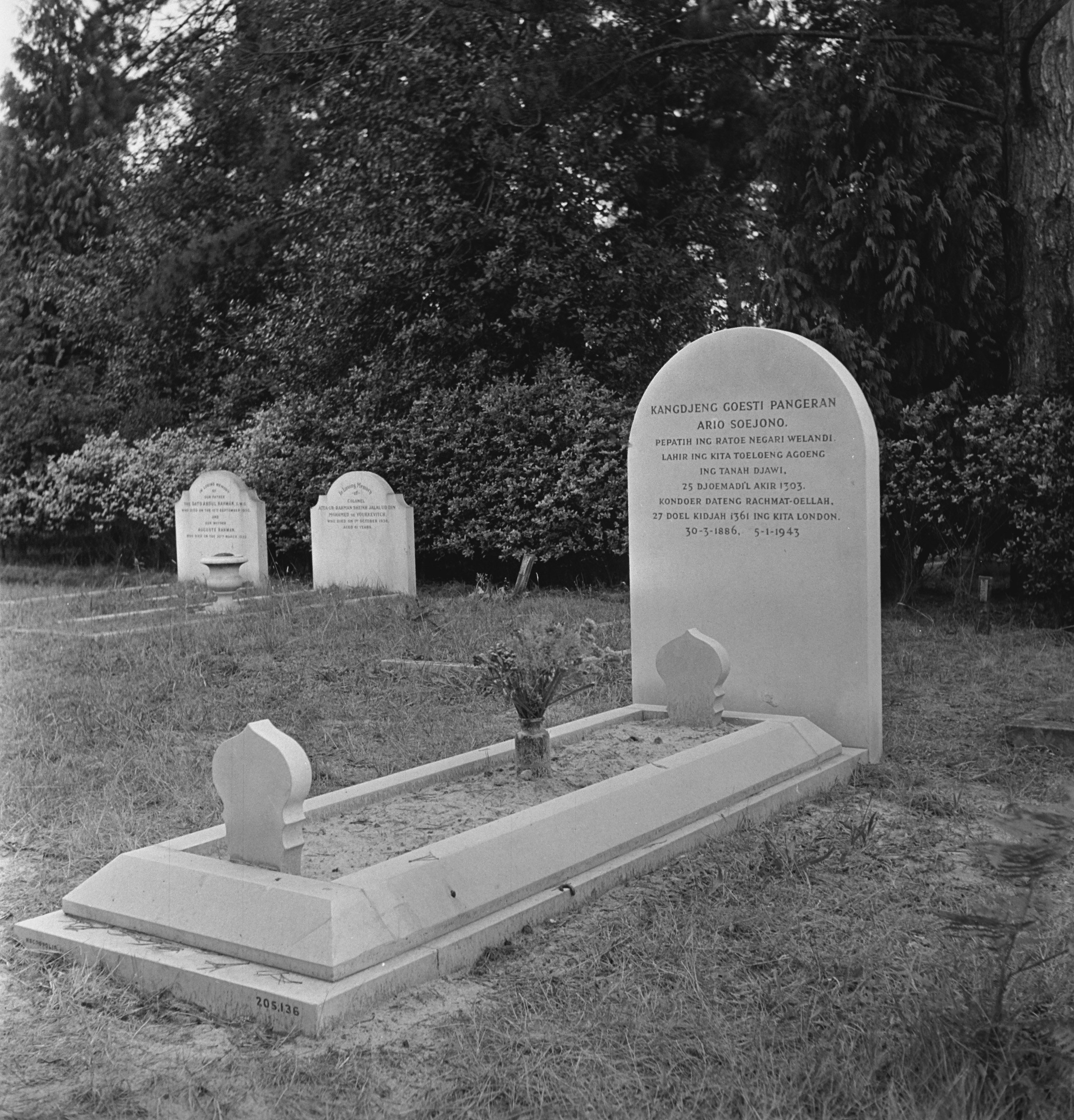
Soejono's grave in 1944

On 5 January 1943, seven months after his installation as minister, Soejono died unexpectedly from cardiac arrest at the age of 56. He was buried at the Muslim Burial Ground in Woking, in attendance of government representatives and Indonesian personnel of the Royal Netherlands Navy.

His eldest son, Irawan Soejono (24 January 1920 – 13 January 1945), served in the Dutch resistance and was killed by German troops in 1945.

== Honours ==
=== Titles ===
- Raden Toemenggoeng (1915–1922)
- Raden Toemenggoeng Ario (1922–1925)
- Raden Adipati Ario (since 1925)
- Pangeran (since October 1942), granted by Queen Wilhelmina for meritorious service to the Kingdom

=== Decorations ===
- Commander of the Order of the Black Star (France)
- Officer of the Order of Public Instruction (France)
- Officer of the Order of Orange-Nassau (Netherlands)
- Knight of the Order of the Netherlands Lion (Netherlands)
