= Abdul Rasjid =

Dutch East Indies physician and politician

Abdul Rasjid Siregar gelar Mangaradja Mahkota Soeangkoepon (born 1891, date of death unknown, Perfected Spelling: Abdul Rasyid Siregar gelar Mangaraja Suangkupon), commonly known as Dr. Abdul Rasjid, was a politician and physician in the Dutch East Indies. He was elected or appointed to the Volksraad from 1931 to 1942, during which time he sat with the Indonesian nationalist faction. During the 1930s, he became convinced that public health and cooperation with traditional healers should be central to the mission of physicians in the Indies.

== Biography ==
Abdoel Rasjid was born in 1891 in Padang, West Sumatra, Dutch East Indies, into an elite Angkola Batak family with roots in Sipirok. He was the younger brother of Mangaradja Soeangkoepon, who would also later become a politician.

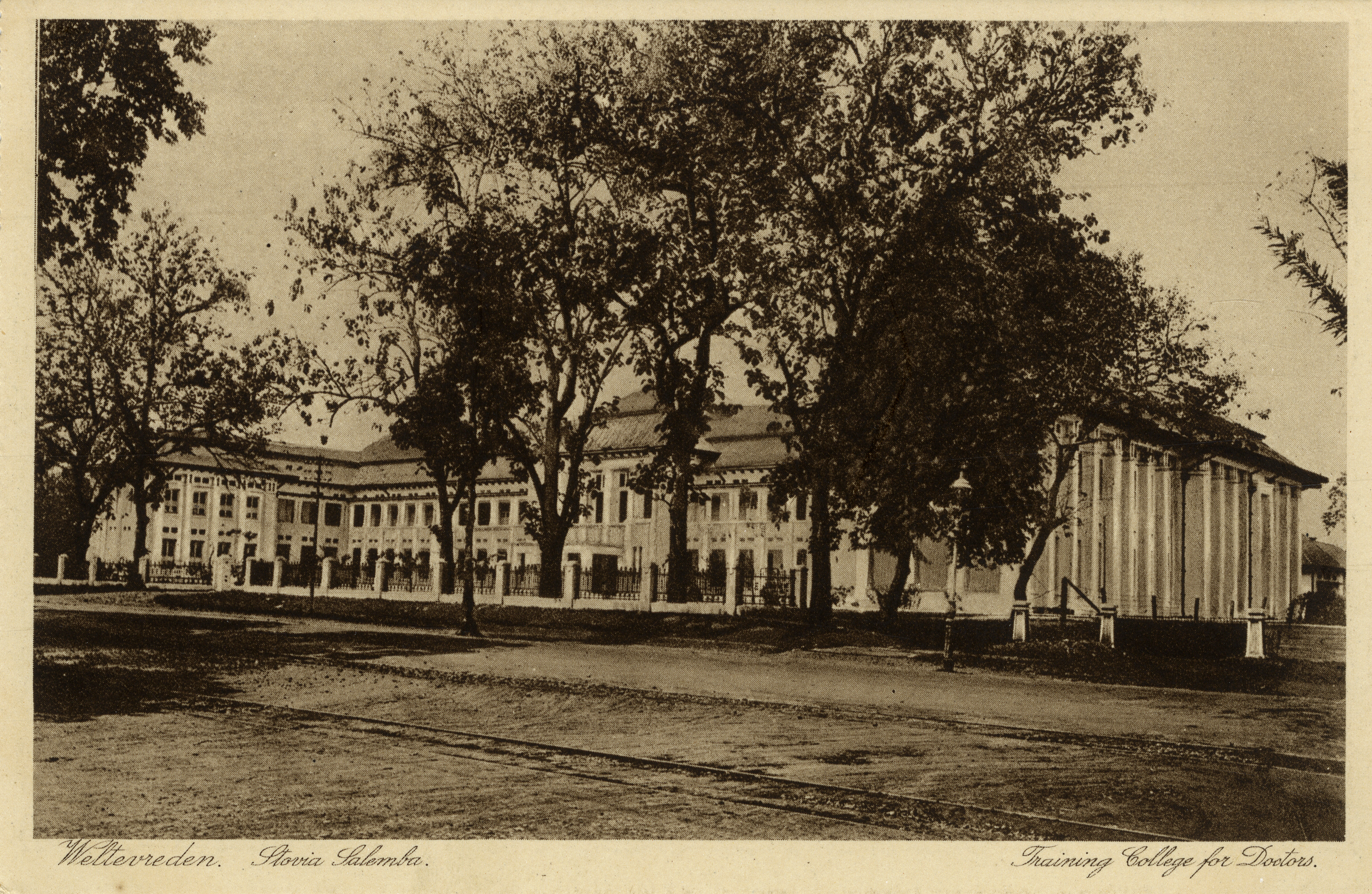
Weltevreden. Stovia Salemba College for Doctors (KITLV)

He studied medicine at STOVIA starting in around 1910 and graduated in 1914 as a native physician (Dutch: Inlandsche Artsen, a lower status than European physicians). After graduating he entered the government medical service and was sent to Medan in Sumatra. He also entered local politics, and was appointed in July 1917 to the local council in Tanjungbalai in North Sumatra. In 1919 he left Sumatra for a time and temporarily took up a teaching and physician post at STOVIA in Batavia. While living in Batavia he was also a leader in a Batak cultural club (Dutch: Batakschebond), which was inspired by the recently founded, Padang-based Jong Soematranen Bond. In late 1920 he put his name on the electoral list for Tjipto Mangoenkoesoemo's Nationaal Indische Partij in the 1921 Dutch East Indies Volksraad election, but was not elected. In 1922 he also attended the NIP-dominated nationalist Sumatran Unity Congress (Dutch: Soematraansch Eenheidscongres, also known as the Groot-Sumatra's Congres) in Padang. He gave a lecture in this conference where he called for unity between Sumatrans of different ethnic backgrounds.

He returned to Sumatra and established his practice in Padangsidempuan in North Sumatra, where he developed a loyal following serving the local Batak population. He was a major advocate for the respecting of Batak traditions and Adat; he worried that it would be lost during the rush to modernize society. While living in Padangsidempuan he chaired an Adat committee which examined issues surrounding it and issued publications.

In the 1931 Dutch East Indies Volksraad election he was first appointed to the Volksraad, where his older brother Mangaradja Soeangkoepon had already been a fairly high-profile member since 1927. He joined the Fractie nationaal, an informal group in the Volksraad consisting of Indonesian nationalist members from various parties. Like his brother Mangaradja Soeangkoepon, Abdul Rasjid worked hard to advance the interests of native Indonesians in the Dutch political system, but remained highly skeptical of its ability to deliver real change when it was so undemocratic and was dominated by the European minority.

He was reelected in the 1935 Dutch East Indies Volksraad election. In 1938 he became president of the Vereeniging van Indische Artsen (Society of Indies Physicians, known in Indonesian as Perkoempoelan Tabib Indonesia, PERTABIN), an organization which had been founded in 1911 but which had declined in importance since then. Inspired by the Rockefeller Foundation, which was promoting a public health project in Java at that time, he developed the Society to turn its attention to public health promotion as its primary mission. He criticized the way that the Dutch tried to deliver health care services to remote regions via Christian missionaries and called for a new system which allowed collaboration between local Western-educated doctors, nurses and midwives and local traditional healers. He also established a private foundation in Tapanoeli Residency, which was funded by local villagers, to promote health and hygiene there. He advocated for the colonial government to fund a new colony-wide Therapeutic Institute which would regulate and allow for the use of traditional Indonesian medicine such as Jamu.

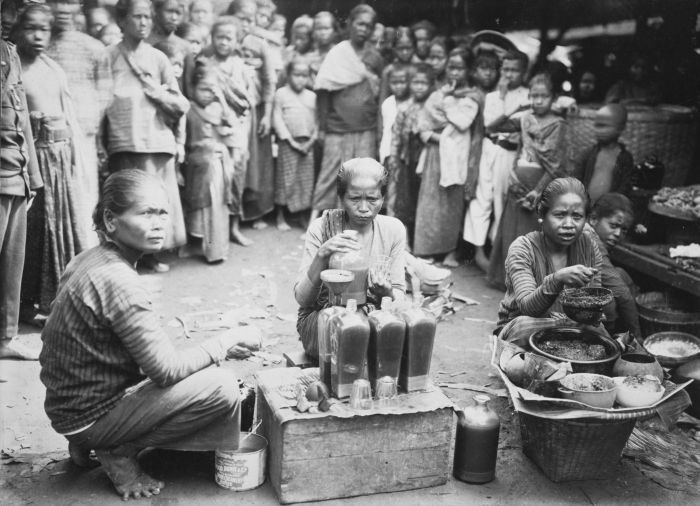
Women selling Jamu (traditional health elixir) in Yogyakarta, Dutch East Indies, c.1910-1930s

Again in the 1939 Dutch East Indies Volksraad election he was reelected; he failed the first vote, but won in a Runoff election against another representative from Padangsidempuan, Mr. Binaga. In July 1939 he withdrew from the Fractie nationaal and joined a smaller group called the Indonesisch nationalistische groep which was to be chaired by his brother Mangaradja Soeangkoepon. The other members of this new faction, essentially a Sumatran bloc, were his brother, Mohammad Yamin, and Tadjuddin Noor.

During the Japanese occupation of the Dutch East Indies, in 1943, he was appointed as an advisor to the Japanese authorities along with Sukarno, Mohammad Yamin and others. He was also appointed to the Central Advisory Council, an advisory body similar to the Volksraad. He helped negotiate the reopening of the medical school in Batavia, which had been closed during the invasion, and became a member of its faculty. Later in the war, when the Japanese allowed some colonial-era organizations to resume their activity, the Society of Indies Physicians requested permission to do so, but they declined to allow it to reopen.

After Indonesia gained its independence in 1949 the native doctors behind the Society of Indies Physicians were among the founding members of a new organization, the Ikatan Dokter Indonesia.

Abdul Rasjid's participation in the independence era and his year of death are not well documented.
