= Mangaradja Soangkoepon =

Dutch East Indies politician

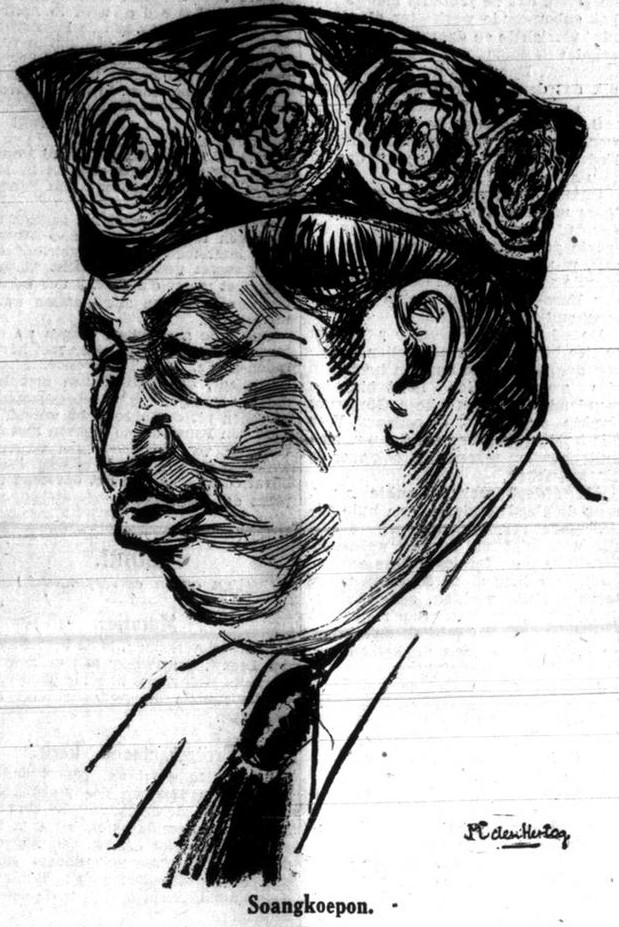
Maharadja Soeangkoepon portrait from De Indische Courant, 1941

Abdoel Firman Siregar gelar Mangaradja Soangkoepon (1885–1946, Perfected Spelling: Abdul Firman Siregar gelar Mangaraja Soangkupon) was a politician and Volksraad member in the Dutch East Indies. He was an Indonesian nationalist and was a political ally of many of the leaders who came to power in the early independence era, although he himself died before the country achieved its independence.

== Biography ==
Mangaradja Soeangkoepon was born on 26 December 1885 into an aristocratic Angkola Batak family in Sipirok or possibly in Padangsidempuan; his father was a local district head. His early education is not well documented; likely he studied in a local Dutch-language school. When he was passed over for succession to the family title by his father in 1902, he left for East Sumatra. His younger brother Abdul Rasjid would later become a STOVIA-educated native physician and politician as well.

In 1906 he was appointed subdistrict head (Dutch: onderdistrictshoofd) in Sosa Julu, Padang Lawas Regency, North Sumatra. In 1910 he left the Indies for Europe, enrolling in a teacher's college in Leiden. He returned to Sumatra in 1914 and briefly worked for the newspaper Pewarta Deli. In 1915 he returned to government service and held various administrative roles in Tapanoeli Residency and East Sumatra, including time spent on the local council of Pematangsiantar and Tanjungbalai. During this period he seems to have been influenced by the Indonesian National Awakening which was spreading rapidly among the native population of the Dutch East Indies.

He was appointed to represent East Sumatra in the May 1927 Dutch East Indies Volksraad election, and relocated to Batavia. In some press coverage he was reported as an independent member, whereas others name him as a member of the PEB (Dutch: Nederlandsch-Indische Politiek Economischen Bond). By this time he seems to have been a moderate Indonesian nationalist, willing to work with the Dutch but also aiming at eventual independence. During his first term he especially focused on issues of injustice that were being ignored by European members of the Volksraad; these included exploitative import and export schemes which hit the native population hard while enriching businessmen and plantation owners, or double standards in legal treatment of natives which could basically turn them into slave labour for Europeans. He became part of an informal Indonesian Nationalist group within this institution which structurally underrepresented Indonesians and gave Europeans an artificial majority. In fact, Soeangkoepon himself tried to propose amendments to the weighting of votes and memberships in Volksraad in late 1927, arguing that according to their proportion in the population, if the Europeans were owed 25 seats then by the same math the native population should have 7100 seats. One European critic in the Volksraad replied that the parliamentary system was a product of Western thinking and that it does not fit well with Easterners.

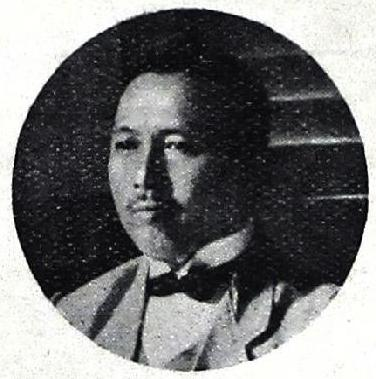
Maharadja Soeangkoepon in the 1920s

In the Volksraad, the Dutch leaders tried to divide native members between good "evolutionary" and bad "revolutionary" nationalists and pit them against one another. Soeangkoepon seems to have evolved into a more radical position during the course of his term in the Volksraad. They persecuted members of the Indonesian National Party led by Sukarno and many European members banded together in a chauvinistic pro-European clique called the Fatherland Club (Dutch: Vaderlandsche Club). In response, in January 1930 Mohammad Husni Thamrin formed nationalists into an official group called the Fractie nationaal. Soeangkoepon was a member of it along with R. P. Suroso, Dwijo Sewoyo, Mukhtar, Datuk Kayo, Sutadi and Pangeran Ali; their stated platform was for Indonesia to become independent from the Netherlands as quickly as possible, and to maintain a common front against divide-and-conquer tactics. He was reelected in the June 1931 Dutch East Indies Volksraad election. In that election his younger brother Dr. Abdul Rasjid was also elected to the volksraad as a member.

In the June 1935 Dutch East Indies Volksraad election he was once again reelected. During that session he sat on a committee for educational reform with Loa Sek Hie, Oto Iskandar di Nata, and a number of other members. Soeangkoepon continued to advance the interests of East Sumatra in the Volksraad. In the late 1930s he presented the demands of many Sumatran peasants, who were starving due to plantation cultivation practices which prioritized export crops.

He was reelected in the 1939 Dutch East Indies Volksraad election; his brother Abdul Rasjid failed to win in the first vote but was confirmed after a runoff vote. Soeangkoepon had been challenged during this election as well; some conservative Malays in Medan had tried to replace him with a more moderate figure, but did not have enough votes. In July 1939 he withdrew from the Fractie nationaal and carried on in the Volksraad in a smaller group called the Indonesisch nationalistische groep, which he chaired. The other members of this new faction were his brother Abdul Rasjid, Mohammad Yamin, and Tadjuddin Noor. That summer he also publicly accused the government of having lowered the status of the Volksraad over the previous decade and in particular disregarding the wishes of Indonesian members. In November 1939, partly influenced by the outbreak of World War II, he and his group sent a petition to the Tweede kamer in the Netherlands calling for the establishment of a fully-formed, directly elected parliament in the Indies. The petition stated that twenty years had passed since the Netherlands' 1918 declaration of moving towards self-government and called upon the government to make good on its claims to support reformist nationalists while rejecting radicals. It also noted that the Indies was quite remote from the Netherlands and that they could not necessarily expect support, military defense or coherent directions while Europe was in the middle of a war.

In 1940 he was vilified in the colonial press for his statement in the Volksraad that the Dutch government and European officials only knew the outer regions of the Indies through the collection of taxes, which he characterized as causing hunger and deprivation to the populations there. In Fall 1940 he was also awarded the Order of Orange-Nassau. In September 1941 there was a debate on extending the vote to women (including Indonesian women). Soeankoepon was one of the only members to vote against it, along with T. de Raadt and Loa Sek Hie.

During the Japanese occupation of the Dutch East Indies, he returned to Sumatra. Like many Indonesian Nationalists, he was willing to work with the Japanese, and was made head of a Japanese-supported Indonesian committee called BOMPA (Indonesian: Badan Oentoek Membantor Pertahanan Asia, Body for assisting the defence of Asia). In November 1943, in an effort to give some limited autonomy to Indonesians, the East Sumatra People's Council was made with a plan to have yearly elections. Soeangkoepon became chairman in the first year, with Hamka appointed as a member; Tengkoe Mansjoer became the next chairman in 1944. By 1945 Soeangkoepon seems to have fallen out of favour with the Japanese. Upon the defeat of the Japanese, he and other East Sumatran notables such as Teuku Mohammad Hasan and Tengku Hafas helped arrange for the surrender of local Japanese officers to the British Army.

During the Indonesian National Revolution he was appointed as the Resident in Medan alongside Luat Siregar and Abdoe'lxarim M. S. His health was poor during this time, as he had Diabetes and other health issues. He died in early 1946 in Medan.
