= Parindra =

Great Indonesia Party Partai Indonesia Raya (Parindra)
- Chairperson: Soetomo (1935); Woerjaningrat (1938); R.P. Soeroso (1949)
- Founded: December 1935 (First incarnation); November 1949 (Second incarnation)
- Dissolved: 20 May 1942 (First incarnation)
- Preceded by: Budi Utomo, Indonesian National Union
- Newspaper: Soeara Parindra
- Youth wing: Surya Wirawan
- Membership: 3,425 (1936); 10,000 (December 1939)
- Ideology: Indonesian nationalism National conservatism
- Anthem: Mars Parindra

The Great Indonesia Party (Indonesian: Partai Indonesia Raya), better known as Parindra, was an Indonesian political party which was active from 1935 to 1942 and was later re-established in 1949.

== Pre-war party ==
=== Establishment and early years ===
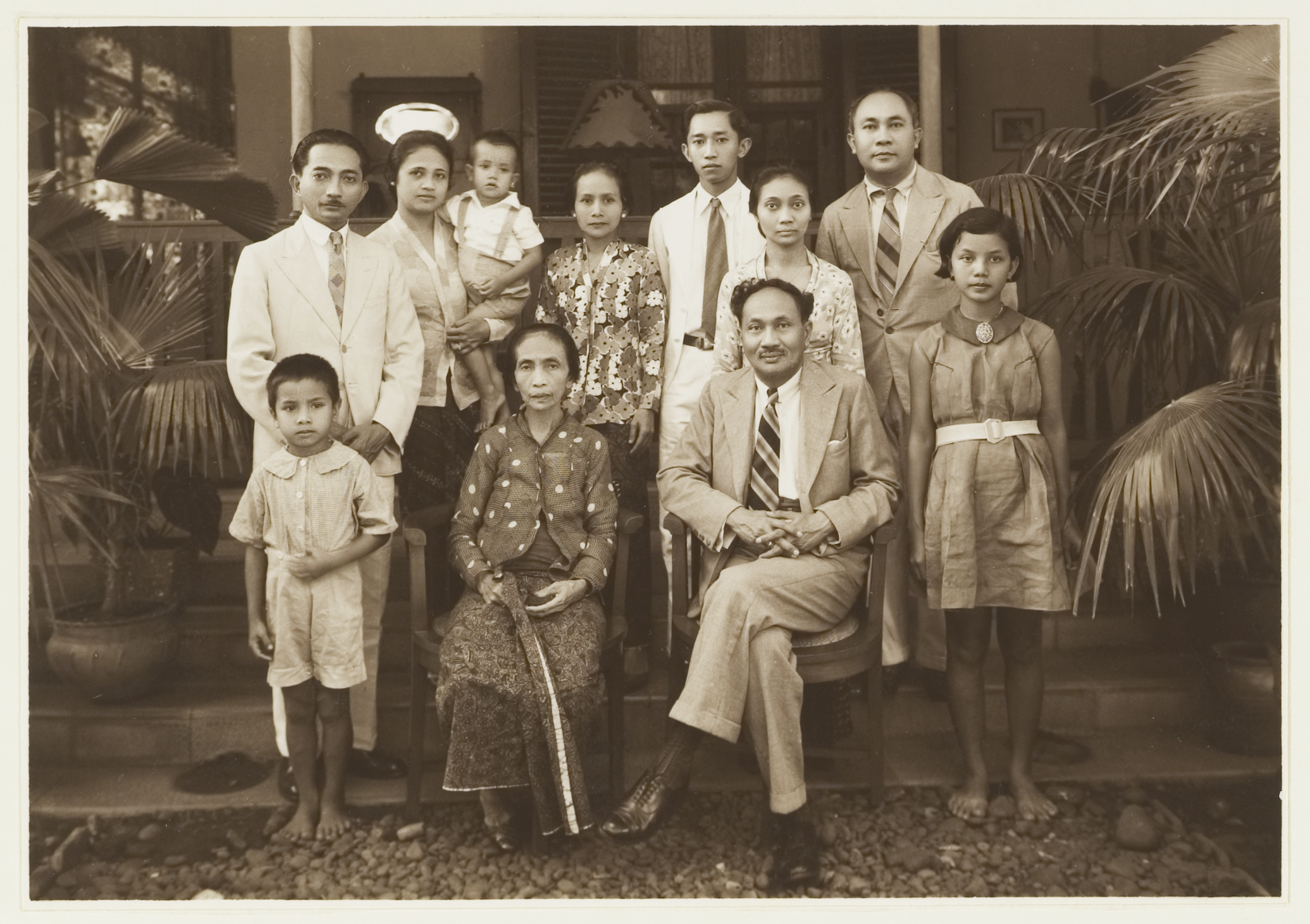
Dr. Soetomo, Chairman of Parindra, with his family (c. 1937)

The first Parindra was established at a congress in Solo from 24-26 December 1935 as a result of a merger between the Budi Utomo political society and the Indonesian National Union (Perserikatan Bangsa Indonesia) with the aim of working with the Dutch to secure Indonesian independence, grouping it with the "cooperative" nationalist organizations. The party's aims were:

- to reinforce the spirit of the unity of the Indonesian people
- to conduct political activities in order to obtain full political rights in a system of government based on democracy and nationalism
- to improve the people's economic and social welfare

The party was led by Soetomo, who was elected at the 1935 congress. Other senior figures included Mohammad Husni Thamrin, Susanto Tirtoprodjo, Sukarjo Wiryopranoto and Woerjaningrat. The party became the most influential Indonesian grouping in the Volksraad, the notionally legislative body established by the Dutch. In the 1935 election, it won two seats in the body, with a further party member appointed directly.

Over the course of 1936, Parindra held a series of public meetings to convey its aspirations to the people. By the end of the year, it had 3,425 members and 57 branches. At its first congress, held in Batavia from 15-18 May 1937, the party claimed to be neither cooperative nor non-cooperative, although its willingness to participate in the Volksraad meant it was in fact cooperative. It pledged to obtain as many seats as possible in the various councils. Two motions were passed, firstly the urge the government to improve the national shipping service and train Indonesians to be sailors, and secondly to set up as many party branches as possible. A second party congress, held in Bandung from 24-27 December 1938 elected Woerjaningrat as leader to replace Soetomo, who had recently died in May 30th. The party also decided to allow members of the Peranakan ethnic group to join the party. It also passed motions calling for a reduction in unemployment, more spending on public works and a reduction in laborers' working hours.

=== Youth wing and Nazi salute ===
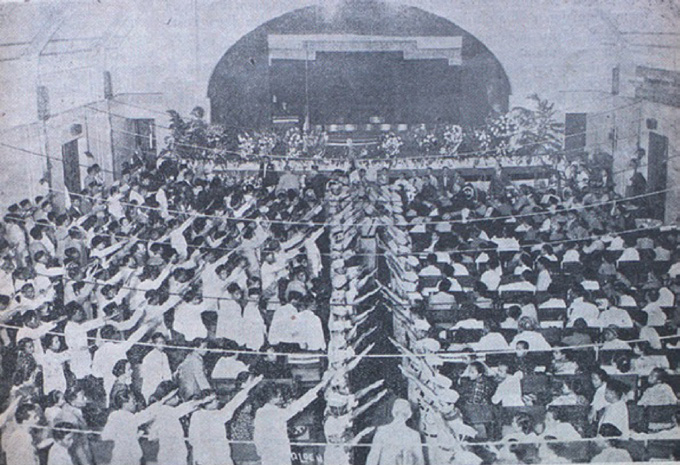
Perindra second congress, Bandung, 1939

Parindra had a youth 'scout organization', Soerja Wirawan, which used a version of Roman salute, similar to the Nazi salute, with the arm in a straight line. As early as 1937, members began using this salute, which was called groot saluut, saluut terhormat or great salute. Newspaper articles from the period 1935-42 remarked on Parindra’s bizarre practice, but it was only officially banned in 1941, as colonial authorities became increasingly uneasy about the prospects of a Japanese invasion. In 1941, Mohammad Husni Thamrin died, five days after he was put under house arrest by the Dutch colonial authorities after being suspected for supplying information to the Japanese. As Jan Anne Jonkman, president of the Volksraad from 1939 until 1942, put it in his memoirs: “Thamrin was buried like a prince. The interest and sympathy of the Indonesians were overwhelming.” During his burial ceremony, with a militaristic style, Soekardjo Wirjopranoto – an influential Parindrist, march through Soerja Wirawan youths performing the salute, which is allegedly a name with Pro-Japanese tendencies. Although Parindra maintained that the party “did not adopt [the salute] out of a particular sympathy for Hitler and his Nazis.”

=== Final years and banning ===
In the 1939 Volksraad election, four Parindra members were elected to the Volksraad, but none were appointed. In May 1939, Thamrin was the main driving force behind the merger of Parindra and seven other nationalist organizations into the Federation of Indonesian Political Parties (Gaboengan Politek Indonesia, GAPI). The party planned to hold its third congress in Banjarmasin, but it was cancelled following the enactment of martial law after the German invasion of the Netherlands. On 10 January 1942, Japan invaded and subsequently occupied the Dutch East Indies. On 20 March, the Japanese authorities ordered all political parties to be dissolved and banned political activity.

== Activities ==
Parindra tried to organise the Tani (peasantry) by establishing Rukun Tani (Farmers' Association), organise the shipping workers' union by establishing Rukun Pelayaran Indonesia (Rupelin), organise the economy by advocating Swadeshi (self-help), establishing the Indonesian National Bank in Surabaya, and establishing printing presses that published newspapers and magazines. Parindra's activities were increasingly supported by the then Governor General of the Dutch East Indies, van Starkenborg, who replaced de Jonge in 1936. Governor-General van Starkenborg modified the politiestaat (police state) left by de Jonge, into a beambtenstaat (administrator state) that gave comparatively better concessions to organisations that cooperated with the Dutch East Indies government.

In 1937, Parindra had 4,600 members. By the end of 1938, it had 11,250 members. These members were mostly concentrated in East Java. By May 1941 (the eve of the Pacific war), Parindra had an estimated 19,500 members.

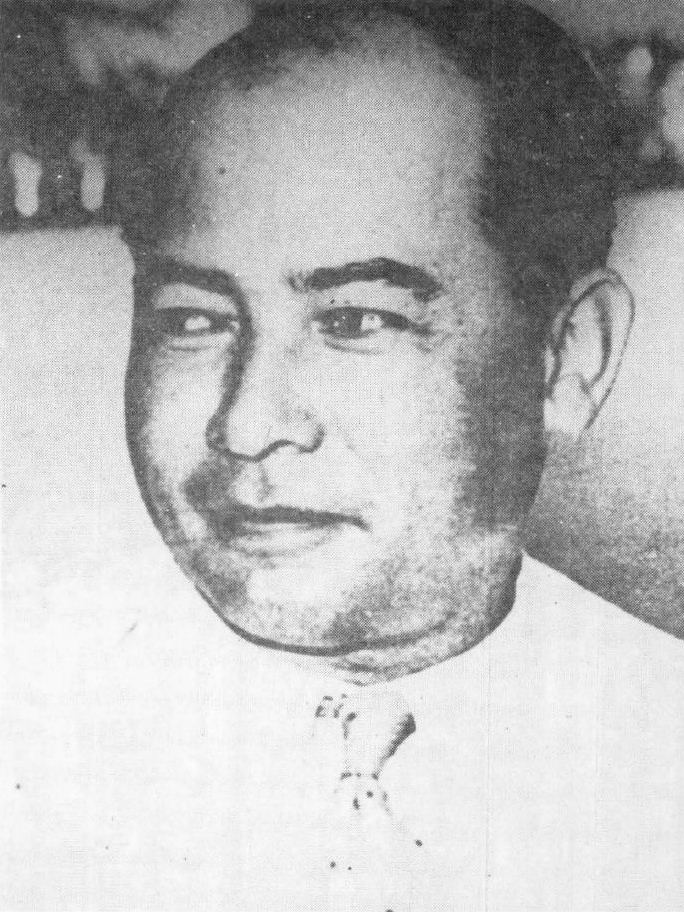
Leading Parindra, M.H. Thamrin was influential in repeatedly pressuring the Dutch to grant major concessions, much to his surprise.

When Dr. Soetomo died in May 1938, his position as chairman of Parindra was replaced by Moehammad Hoesni Thamrin (MHT), a merchant and Volksraad member. Before becoming chairman of Parindra, Moehammad Hoesni Thamrin had established trade contacts with the Japanese so that he can played the Pro-Japanese card when he was on the Volksraad political stage. Because of his strong political activities and his closeness to the Japanese, the Dutch East Indies government considered Thamrin more dangerous than Soekarno, who was exiled in Ende since 1933. He was widely despised, but also feared, by Dutch conservatives. Thus motions led by Parindra was majority accepted in the Volksraad, such like the motions to implement Indonesian Autonomy and the change of use of degrading Dutch terms of Nederlands Indie, Nederlands Indisch, and Inlander (Dutch Indies, Dutch Indian, and Dutch Indians) be replaced with the nationalist terms of Indonesia, Indonesisch, and Indonesier (Indonesia, Indonesian, and Indonesians); Both vetoed by the Dutch government.

Under suspicion of supplying the Japanese with sensitive informations, on 9 February 1941, Moehammad Hoesni Thamrin's house was searched by the PID (Dutch East Indies secret service) while he was suffering from malaria, days later Mohammad Hoesni Thamrin died.

Parindra is thus portrayed as a party that cooperated with the Dutch East Indies government at the beginning of its establishment, but was suspected at the end of the Dutch East Indies rule in Indonesia in 1942 as a party that flirted with Japan to gain independence.

== Post-independence party ==
The second Parindra was established as a "splinter party" in November 1949 by one of the leaders of the pre-war party, R.P. Soeroso, who subsequently served in several cabinets. Its membership comprised members of the old Parindra that had decided not to join the PNI. Initially it had seven members in the Provisional People's Representative Council, although party faction leader Lobo subsequently defected to another party, Persatuan Rakyat Marhaen Indonesia.

The three pillars of the party were patriotism, populism and social justice. Its aims were to strengthen the position of the Indonesian state and people, to bring about a democratic unitary state, to strive for a socialist society, and to promote national culture. Among its priorities were the inclusion of West Papua within Indonesia, the implementation of a unitary, not federal, state and the holding of general elections as soon as possible.

The party contested the 1955 legislative election, but despite party members having held important roles in Indonesian cabinets, its share of the vote was so small that it failed to win any seats in the legislature.
