= 1935 Dutch East Indies Volksraad election =

- 38 of the 60 seats in the Volksraad; 31 seats needed for a majority
Party	Seats	+/–
Nationalist	10	
Native Administrative Officials Union	7	
Minahasan Union	1	
Javan Catholic Political Union	1	
Partai Tionghoa Indonesia	1	
Christian Constitutional Party	5	
Political Economic Union	5	
Association of Civil Service Officers	2	
Indies Catholic Party	1	
Regents Union	1	
Homeland Affairs representative	1	
Independent Catholic representative	1	
Middle-class representative	1	
Indo Europeesch Verbond	9	
Fatherland Club	5	
Chung Hwa Hui	2	
Arab representative	1	
Entrepreneurs representative	2	
Independent native representatives	2	
This lists parties that won seats. See the complete results below.

Elections to the Volksraad were held in the Dutch East Indies in 1935.

== Electoral system ==
The Volksraad had a total of 60 members, 38 of which were elected and 22 appointed. Seats were also assigned to ethnic groups, with 25 for the Dutch population (15 elected, 10 appointed), 30 for the native population (20 elected, 10 appointed) and five for the foreign Orientals (Chinese and Arab Indonesian) (3 elected, 2 appointed).

== Candidates and parties ==
The candidates and parties could be divided into left, right and centrist groups:

Left group

- Nationalists, led by R.M.A.A. Koesoemo Oetojo from Boedi Oetomo (among the representatives were Mohammad Husni Thamrin from the Betawi ethnic group and Oto Iskandar di Nata from Paguyuban Pasundan
- Native Administrative Officials Union (among the representatives were Achmad Djajadiningrat, Wiranatakusumah V and Jahja Datoek Kajo)
- Minahasan Union from Northern Celebes, represented by Sam Ratulangi
- Javan Catholic Political Union led by Ignatius Joseph Kasimo Hendrowahyono
- Chinese Indonesian Party

Centrist group

- Christian Constitutional
- Indies Catholic Party, led by
- Political Economic Union
- Association of Civil Service Officers
- Homeland Affairs representative
- Regents Union

Right group

- Indo Europeesch Verbond led by Dick de Hoog
- Fatherland Club led by Feuilleteau de Bruyn
- Chung Hwa Hui, Chinese Association led by Hok Hoei Kan and Loa Sek Hie
- Arab representative (Sayyid Ismail bin Sayyid Abdoellah bin Alwi Alatas)
- Entrepreneurs (plantation owners) representative
- Independent native representatives, led by R. Sosrohadikoesoemo from Southern Celebes

== Results ==
Party or alliance		Seats			
Party or alliance		Native	European	Other	Total
Left Group	Nationalists	10	0	0	10
Left Group	Native Administrative Officials Union	7	0	0	7
Left Group	Minahasan Union	1	0	0	1
Left Group	Javan Catholic Political Union	1	0	0	1
Left Group	Chinese Indonesian Party	0	0	1	1
Left Group	Total	19	0	1	20
Centrist group	Christian Constitutional Party	3	2	0	5
Centrist group	Political Economic Union	3	1	1	5
Centrist group	Association of Civil Service Officers	2	0	0	2
Centrist group	Indies Catholic Party	0	1	0	1
Centrist group	Regents Union	1	0	0	1
Centrist group	Homeland Affairs representative	0	1	0	1
Centrist group	Independent Catholic representative	0	1	0	1
Centrist group	Middle-class representative	0	1	0	1
Centrist group	Total	9	7	1	17
Right group	Indo Europeesch Verbond	0	9	0	9
Right group	Fatherland Club	0	5	0	5
Right group	Chung Hwa Hui	0	0	2	2
Right group	Arab representative	0	0	1	1
Right group	Entrepreneurs representative	0	4	0	4
Right group	Independent native representatives	2	0	0	2
Right group	Total	2	18	3	23
Total		30	25	5	60
Source: Koloniaal Tijdschrift, Vol. 24, 1935

== Members ==
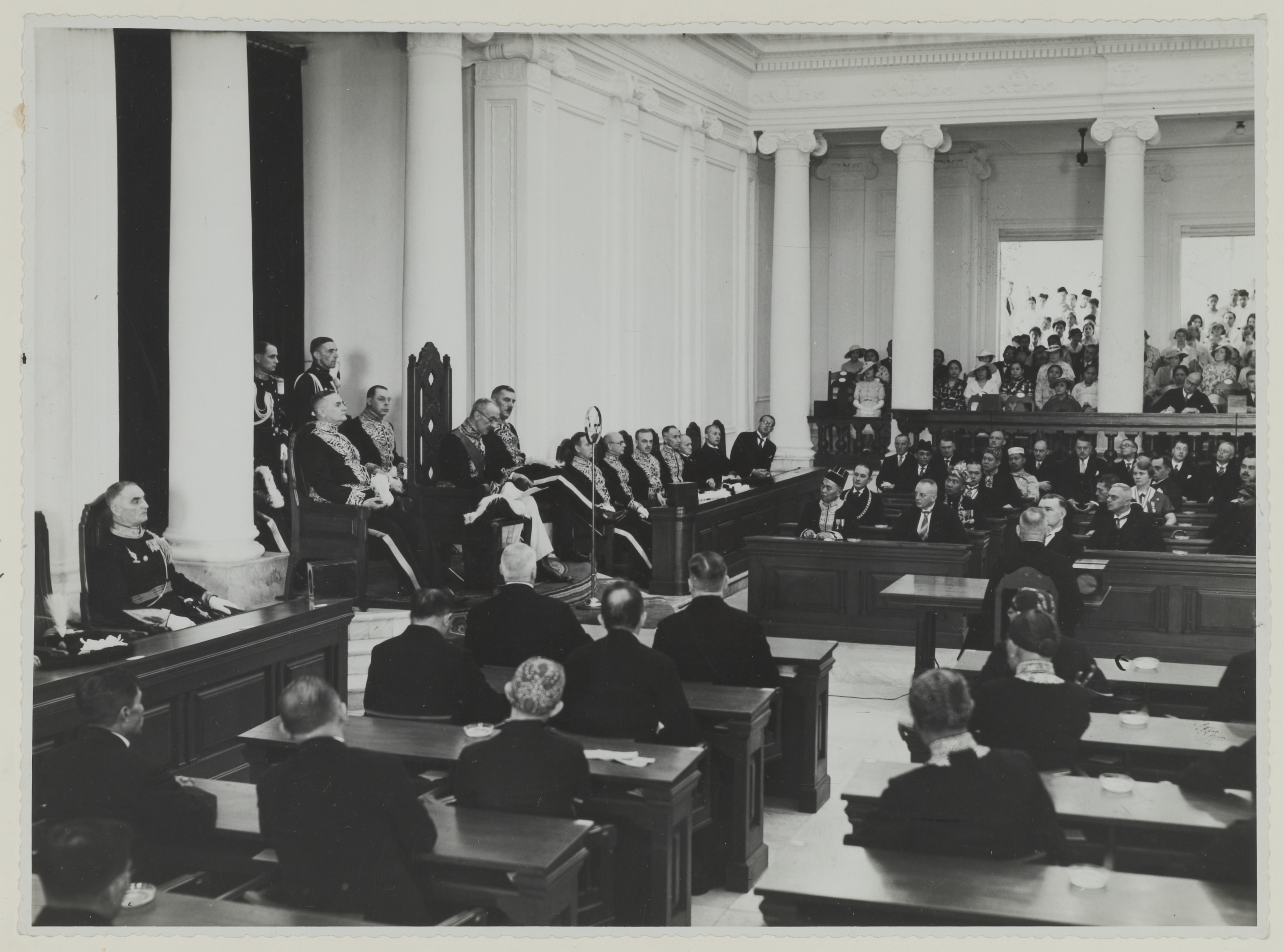
Opening of the 1936 Volksraad by Governor General B.C. de Jonge

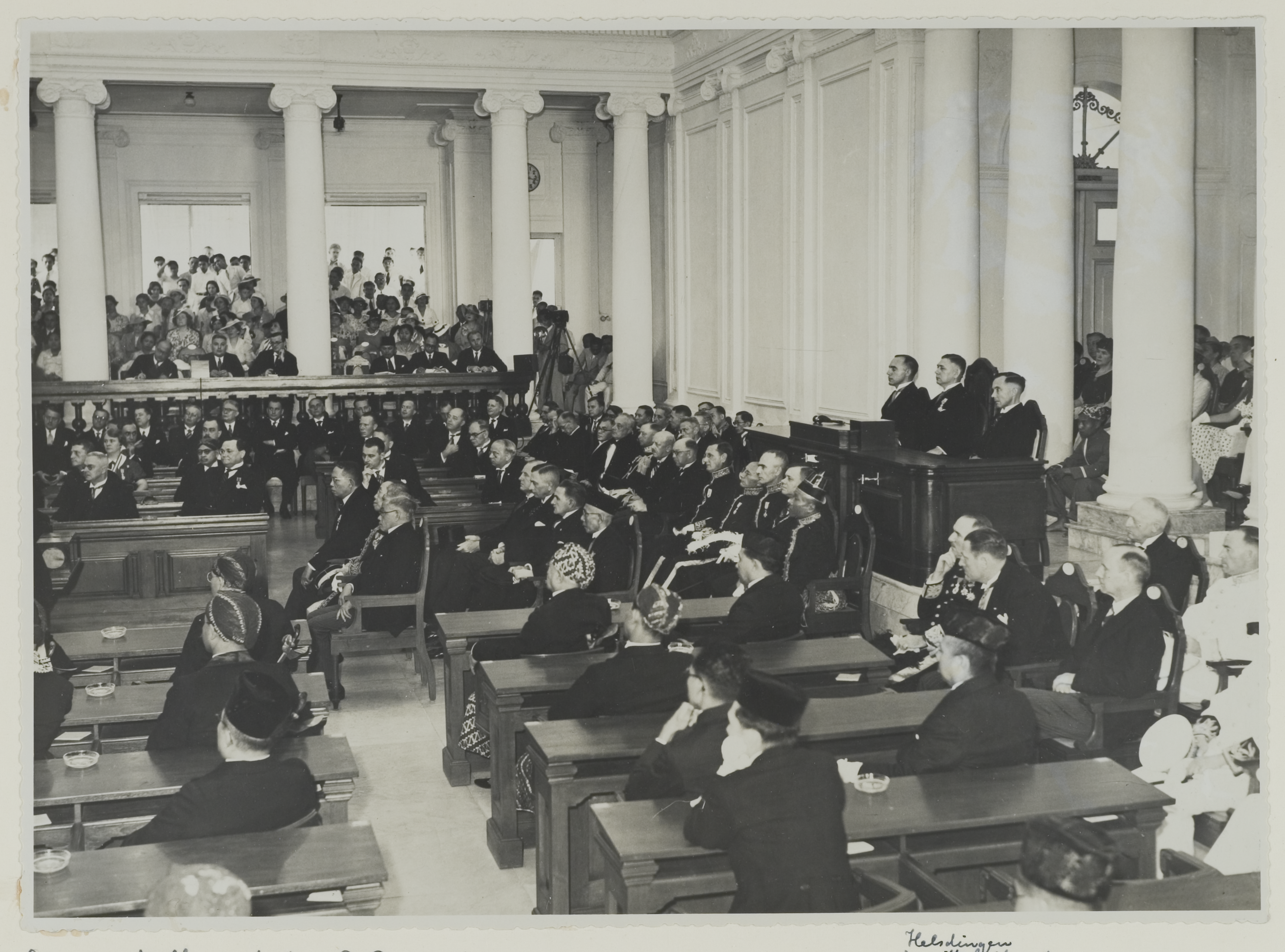

Chairman: Mr. H.J. Spit.

First Deputy: R.M.A.A. Koesoemo Oetojo.

Second Deputy: F.H. de Hoog.

Name	Background	Residence	Membership
Abdul Rasjid	Native medical doctor (private)	Padangsidempoean	15 June 1931
Ir. Said Mohamad bin Abdullah Alatas	Professional	Batavia	15 June 1931
Dr. D.H.J. Apituley	Army medic officer	Batavia	16 May 1927
Th. van Ardenne	Retired Army infantry officer	Batavia	10 January 1934
Arifin St. Saidi Maharadja	Native medical doctor (government)	Fort de Kock	15 June 1931
W. van Baalen	Chairman of a private company	Batavia	16 May 1927
C.E. Barre	Resident	Buitenzorg	15 June 1931
N. Beets	Assistant Resident	Batavia	16 May 1927
Mr. P. A. Blaauw	Elected delegate	Batavia	16 May 1927
H.J. de Dreu	Headmaster of government school	Batavia	1 March 1930
R.W. Dwidjosewojo	Retired teacher and Former Secretary to Sultan of Djokjakarta	Poerwokerto	18 May 1918
Dr. W.K.H. Feuilletau de Bruyn	Army infantry colonel	Batavia	15 June 1931
Ir. F.L.P.G. Fournier	Elected delegate	Bandoeng	30 June 1930
Mr. R.A.A. Fruin	Elected delegate	Bandoeng	20 May 1924
P.A. Gandasoebrata	Former Regent	Banjoemas	15 June 1931
K.P.H. Hadiwidjojo	Elected delegate	Batavia	20 May 1924
Mr. P.M.C.J. Hamer	Professional	in Europe	15 June 1931
Mr. B.Th.W. van Hasselt	Chief representative from B.P.M. (Bataafse Petroleum Maatschappij)	Batavia	10 January 1934
Mr. C.C. van Helsdingen	Elected delegate	Batavia	20 May 1924
H.J. van Holst Pellekaan	Chairman of advisory committee for rubber regulation	Batavia	15 June 1931
F.H. de Hoog	Elected delegate	Bandoeng	20 May 1924
C. Hoogenboom	Financial administrator for Governor of West Java	Batavia	14 May 1934
R. Oto Iskandar di Nata	Elected delegate	Batavia	15 June 1931
Joebhar Dt. Perpatih	District head of Alahanpandjang	Padang	20 June 1931
Hok Hoei Kan (H. H. Kan)	Elected delegate	Batavia	18 May 1918
I.J. Kasimo	Deputy of farming consultant	Solo	15 June 1931
R.M.A.A. Koesoemo Oetojo	Elected delegate	Batavia	18 May 1918
Dr. H. Kolkman	Chairman of A.V.R.O.S. (Association of rubber planters in East Coast of Sumatra)	Medan	11 January 1932
Loa Sek Hie	Professional	Batavia	15 June 1929
G.J. van Lonkhuyzen	Chairman of Association of European Employees	Batavia	20 May 1924
Toeanku Mahmoed	Civil servant for Governor of Atjeh	Kutaradja	15 June 1931
P.A. Mandagie	District head of Minahasa with title of Major	Manado	17 May 1921
Mochtar bin Praboe Mangkoe Negara	Elected delegate	Batavia	16 May 1927
Ir. Goesti Mohamad Noor	Engineer working in Water Department	Bandjermasin	15 June 1931
J.A. Monod de Froideville	Elected delegate	Bandoeng	16 May 1927
Ir. R.C.A.F.J. Nessel	Mayor of Magelang	Magelang	15 September 1934
R.A.A. Mohamad Notoadisoerjo	Retired regent of Banjoewangi	Semarang	15 November 1934
R.M. Notosoetarso	Accountant of Netherlands Trade Union	Meester-Cornelis	15 June 1931
G. Pastor	Chief of Labor Inspector for Java and Madoera	Meester-Cornelis	15 June 1931
G. Prawotosoemodilogo	Elected delegate	Semarang	15 June 1931
G.S.S.J. Ratu Langie	Professional	Manado	16 May 1927
L.L. Rehatta	Civil servant 1st class	Amboina	10 January 1934
B. Roep	Elected delegate	Lembang	16 May 1922
E. Smith	Retired legal secretary 1st class	Bandoeng	26 June 1934
Abdoel Firman Gelar Mangaradja Soangkoepon	Elected delegate	Batavia	16 May 1927
R. Soekardjo Wirjopranoto	Professional	Malang	15 June 1931
Tjokorde Gde Rake Soekawati	Civil servant and advisor to Resident of Bali-Lombok	Den Pasar	20 May 1924
R.P. Soeroso	Chairman of East Indies Trade Union	Modjokerto	20 May 1924
Mas Soetardjo Kartohadikoesoemo	Elected delegate	Batavia	15 June 1931
R.Ng. Sosrohadikoesoemo	Delegate from Central Java representative council	Semarang	15 June 1931
E. Straatemeier	Director of K.P.M. (Royal Netherlands Packing Company)	Batavia	2 September 1933
Mohamad Hoesni Thamrin	Elected delegate	Batavia	16 May 1927
R.A.A. Tjakraningrat	Regent	Bangkalan	16 June 1931
Tjia Tjeng Siang	Retired titular Major of Chinese	Pontianak	16 May 1927
G.A.Th. Weijer	Elected delegate	Batavia	10 September 1934
R. Demang Wiradiatmadja	Patih	Madjalengka	15 June 1931
R.A.A. Wiranatakoesoema	Elected delegate	Batavia	11 September 1922
R. Wiwoho Poerbohadidjojo	Employee of N.I.S.(East Indies train company)	Semarang	15 June 1931
Dr. W.L. Wolff	Teacher of M.O.	in Europe	15 June 1931
Yo Heng Kam	Elected delegate	Batavia	16 May 1927
Source: Regeeringsalmanak voor Nederlandsch-Indië 1935 Part 2
