= 1939 Dutch East Indies Volksraad election =

- 1939
- 38 of the 60 seats in the Volksraad; 31 seats needed for a majority

Elections to the Volksraad were held in the Dutch East Indies in 1939. Only ten percent of the population was allowed to vote, but this was only to choose 937 electors, who together with another 515 government appointees, in turn elected 38 of the 60 members. The remainder were appointed directly by the colonial government.

== Members ==
Position	Member	Party
Chairman	Jan Jonkman	
First Deputy Chairman	Mohammad Husni Thamrin	Great Indonesia Party
Second Deputy Chairman	Paul Alex Blaauw	Indo Europeesch Verbond
Members	Abdul Rasjid	
Members	Sajjid Oesman bin Ali Aldjoeffry	
Members	D.R.K. de Boer	
Members	R.M. Hamongsapoetro	
Members	M. Harmani	Perhimpoenan Pegawai Bestuur Boemipoetra
Members	C.C. van Helsdingen	Christelijke Staatkundige Partij
Members	J.A. van Helsdingen	
Members	R. Ng. Djojo Achmad Hoedojo	
Members	Oto Iskandar di Nata	Paguyuban Pasundan
Members	P.N. Janssen	
Members	Kan Н.Н.	Chung Hwa Hui
Members	Ignatius Joseph Kasimo Hendrowahyono	Perhimpoenan Politiek Katholiek di Indonesia
Members	P.A. Kerstens	Indische Katholieke Partij
Members	P.J. Kloppenburg	
Members	H. Kolkman	
Members	H.L. La Lau	
Members	Bernard Wilhelm Lapian	
Members	V.Ph. Leunissen	Indo Europeesch Verbond
Members	Loa Sek Hie	
Members	Toeankoe Mahmoed	
Members	Abdoellah Daeng Mapoedji	
Members	Mochtar bin Praboe Mangkoe Negara	
Members	Todung Sutan Gunung Mulia	
Members	N.F.G. Mogot	
Members	N.J.L.M. Mussert	
Members	O.M. Nalaprana	
Members	W.R. van Nauta Lemke	
Members	J. Ch. Neuyen	
Members	Phoa Liong Gie	
Members	R. Prawotosoemodilogo	
Members	G. de Raad	
Members	L.L. Rehatta	
Members	J.W. Roeloffs	
Members	B. Roep	Politiek Economische Bond
Members	M. Salamoen	Vereeniging van Ambtenaren bij den Inlandschen Bestuursdienst
Members	A.C. Sandkuyl	
Members	J.H. Smit	
Members	Mangaradja Soeangkoepon	
Members	R.A.A. Soedibiokoesoemo	
Members	Tjokorda Gde Raka Soekawati	Politiek Economische Bond
Members	R.A.A. Moehamad Moesa Soeria Karta Legawa	
Members	R.A.A. Abas Soeria Nata Atmadja	
Members	R.P. Soeroso	
Members	Soetardjo Kartohadikusumo	Perhimpoenan Pegawai Bestuur Boemipoetra
Members	R.Ng. Sosrohadikoesoemo	
Members	Tadjoeddin Noor	
Members	R.A.A. Iskandar Tirtokoesoemo	
Members	A.F. Vas Dias	
Members	J. Verboom	Vaderlandsche Club
Members	Jhr. C.H.V. de Villeneuve	
Members	E.D. Wermuth	Indo Europeesch Verbond
Members	J.Th. White	Indo Europeesch Verbond
Members	Sukarjo Wiryopranoto	Great Indonesia Party
Members	R. Wiwoho Poerbohadidjojo	Indonesian Islamic Party
Members	Mohammad Yamin	Indonesian Union Party
Members	Yo Heng Kam	Politiek Economische Bond
Members	H. van Zuylen	Indo Europeesch Verbond
Members	W.G.J. Zwart	Indische Katholieke Partij
Members	Source: Regeeringsalmanak voor Nederlandsch-Indië 1941	
