= Pewarta Deli =

Dutch East Indies newspaper

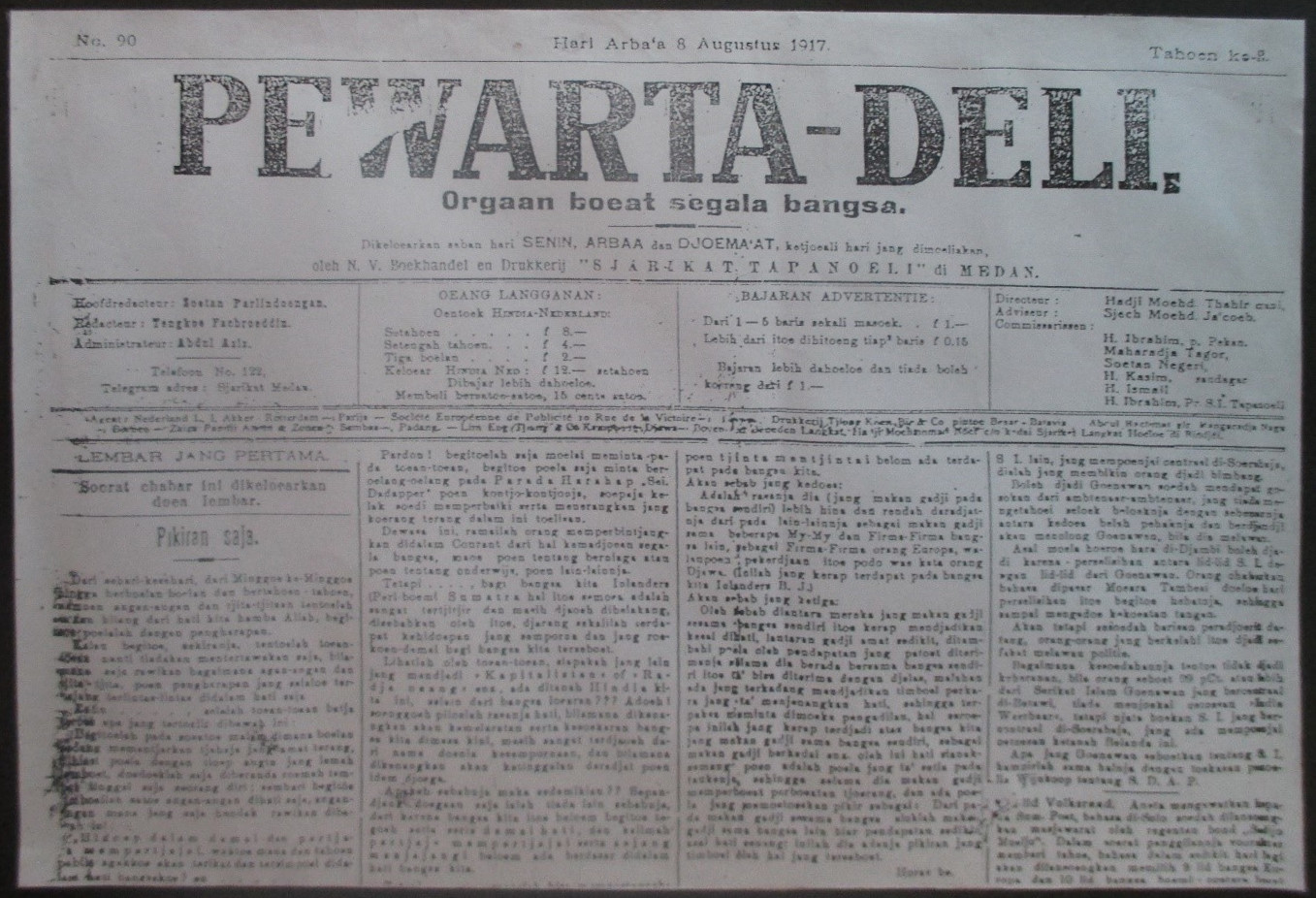
Front page of Pewarta Deli from 8 August 1917

Pewarta Deli was a Malay language newspaper published in Medan, Dutch East Indies from 1910 until 1941, and again from 1945 to 1946. During its run the paper became a strident anti-colonial voice, sympathetic to the Sarekat Islam and Indonesian nationalism and critical of the cruelty of big business in Medan's tobacco and plantation industries. It also gave space in its pages to Communism and Islamic modernism. The paper had a wide readership in its time, with an influence not only in the Indies, but also among Malays in British Malaya.

== History ==
Pewarta Deli was first published in Medan, North Sumatra, Dutch East Indies in January 1910. The newspaper's name means Deli Reporter; Deli was the original name of the city of Medan. The paper was founded by Radja Endar Moeda, a Muslim Batak who had worked as a schoolteacher and journalist and who had founded, edited and directed newspapers and journals since the nineteenth century, including Pertja Barat, Insulinde, and Pemberita Atjeh. Pewarta Deli was owned by Sjarikat Tapanoeli, a company Endar Moeda had recently cofounded in Medan with some Batak businessmen and Peranakan Chinese investors. Aside from Medan, the newspaper also had a ready market in Aceh, which at that time did not have its own newspaper. However, Endar Moeda seems to have had disputes with the owners of the newspaper; in 1911 the paper was reorganized and Haji Mohamed Tahir, a clerk for the magnate Tjong A Fie, took over as director, and Endar Moeda left Medan for Aceh. In 1912 Soetan Parlindoengan became Pewarta Deli's new editor-in-chief. Mangaradja Soeangkoepon, who became better known after 1927 as a Volksraad member, briefly worked for the paper in 1915 as well.

Tengkoe Fachroeddin, a Muslim modernist and Sarekat Islam activist, also joined as an editor, and soon used his platform to criticize all the injustices he saw in the city: discrimination in official posts, unethical procurement of sex workers, the cruel excesses of the native elite, and abuses taking place on plantations in North Sumatra. However, there were also limits to their discourse; the paper fired one of its editors Ismael in 1920 for defending the right to strike too vigorously in the pages of the paper. The paper also had recurring legal troubles due to the strict Dutch censorship laws; editor Parlindoengan was charged several times in 1918 under those laws.

In the early 1920s the writer R. K. Mangoen Atmodjo, editor at the paper Mardeka, was also a columnist at Pewarta Deli.

Maharadja Ihoetan took over as director and editor-in-chief of the paper in 1923. He occasionally ran into trouble with local authorities due to censorship rules; at one point he was charged with insulting an official from Sibolga. Abdoel Hamid Loebis, editor at the paper, was charged in a series of press censorship laws in 1928. Then in late 1929 Mohamad Kanoen, who had previously been at Bintang Timur, became the new editor-in-chief. He almost immediately became involved in court cases as well, after publishing an article judged by officials to be anti-Dutch.

The paper may have hit its peak of popularity in the 1930s, when it was one of the most-read Malay newspapers in the Indies. It also took on a more liberal-nationalist line during this era. Djamaluddin Adinegoro, a European-educated Polyglot physician, political analyst and journalist, took over as head of the paper in 1931. His hiring by the newspaper was considered an impressive feat, as he was a highly educated and active man who had served in government, was a relative of Mohammad Yamin, and among other achievements had published a Malay language dictionary and a bestselling memoir Melawat ke Barat (Journey to the West). However, during his time as editor Adinegoro regularly had problems with Dutch authorities, being arrested or investigated repeatedly for things he printed in the paper, as well as being accused of being a Communist or an agent of the Soviet Union.

In 1936 Abdullah Loebis, longtime director of Sjarikat Tapanoeli and of Pewarta Deli fell into a disagreement with the organization and was removed and replaced with Haji Mohamad Kasim. After his forced resignation, Loebis had the offices of the newspaper locked and a guard posted, which caused a minor scandal; after the staff were able to enter the building from a back entrance, he was forced to have the locks removed.

The newspaper ceased publication during the Japanese occupation of the Dutch East Indies. During that time Adinegoro edited a Japanese-authorized paper called Sumatra Shimbun. As the war ended, Mohamed Said restarted the newspaper and it went to press in September 1945 with A. O. Loebis as editor-in-chief and Said as assistant editor. During the Indonesian National Revolution, the paper unsurprisingly took the side of the Indonesian nationalists against the Dutch and British. Unfortunately, the paper's presses were destroyed by British soldiers in 1946 during the Allied occupation of Sumatra; the paper was unable to recover and neve resumed publication.
