= Council of the Dutch East Indies =

Council of the Dutch East Indies Raad van Nederlandsch-Indië

History
- Established: 1610
- Disbanded: 1942

Leadership
- Chairman: Governor-general of the Dutch East Indies
- Seats: 4 members; 6 members (1930)

Meeting place
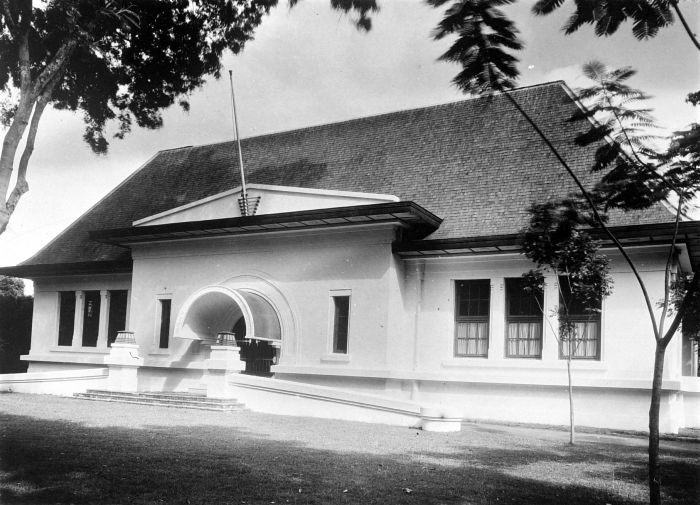
- The Council of the Indies Building in Batavia

The Council of the Indies (Dutch: Raad van Indië; Indonesian: Dewan Hindia) was a body established in 1610 to advise and limit the powers of the governor-general of the Dutch East Indies. Following administrative reforms of 1836, the council was later renamed as the Council of the Dutch East Indies (Dutch: Raad van Nederlandsch-Indië; Indonesian: Dewan Hindia Belanda).

Initially the council had four members and a chairman, all Dutch nationals. In 1930, this was increased to six people, with citizens of the Dutch East Indies eligible for membership. The council was chaired by the governor-general. The Dutch monarch had the authority to make a final decision in the event of a disagreement between the governor-general and the council.

Prior to 1836, the council had the same standing as the governor-general, but that year, its role was reduced to that of an advisory body. It regained some of its powers in 1854, when an act was passed obliging the governor-general to consult it before taking major measures, but he was still under no obligation to heed its advice. Its powers were reduced again in 1925, but the governor-general still had to consult it before taking certain actions, including making announcements or sending proposals to the semi-legislative Volksraad.

In a report sent to Governor-General Alidius Tjarda van Starkenborgh Stachouwer in 1938, the council recommended rejection of the Soetardjo Petition, which had been signed by a number of members of the Volksraad and that asked for a conference to be organised to discuss the autonomy for the Dutch East Indies as part of a Dutch commonwealth. The council took the view that the demands of the petition were at odds with the Dutch constitution and that Indonesia was not ready to become a dominion.

== Membership ==
Role	1922	1931	1941
Vice president	H.N.A. Swart, appointed 2 Sep 1918	C.J.I.M. Welter, appointed 10 Oct 1929	H.J. Spit, appointed 21 Nov 1938
Members	P. de Roo de la Faille, appointed 3 Feb 1919; L.J. Dukstra, appointed 9 Dec 1919; W. Frijling, appointed 2 Mar 1921; H.A. Kinderman, appointed 28 Apr 1921	W.P. Hillen, appointed 15 May 1929; C.W. Bodenhausen, appointed 10 Oct 1929; Achmad Djajadiningrat, appointed 1 Jan 1930; Koesoemo Joedo, appointed 1 Jan 1930; A.H.M.J. van Kan, appointed 6 Mar 1930; L.H.W. van Sandick, appointed 18 Jul 1930	F.H. Visman, appointed 23 Jun 1936; J.H.B. Kuneman, appointed 23 Jun 1936; G.F. de Bruyn Kops, appointed 21 Nov 1938; Soejono, appointed 29 Feb 1940
Secretary	W.G. Stroband, appointed 2 Nov 1921	W.G. Peekema (ad interim), appointed 2 Dec 1929	L.F. Jansen, appointed 25 Oct 1939
