= Tjia Tjeng Siang =

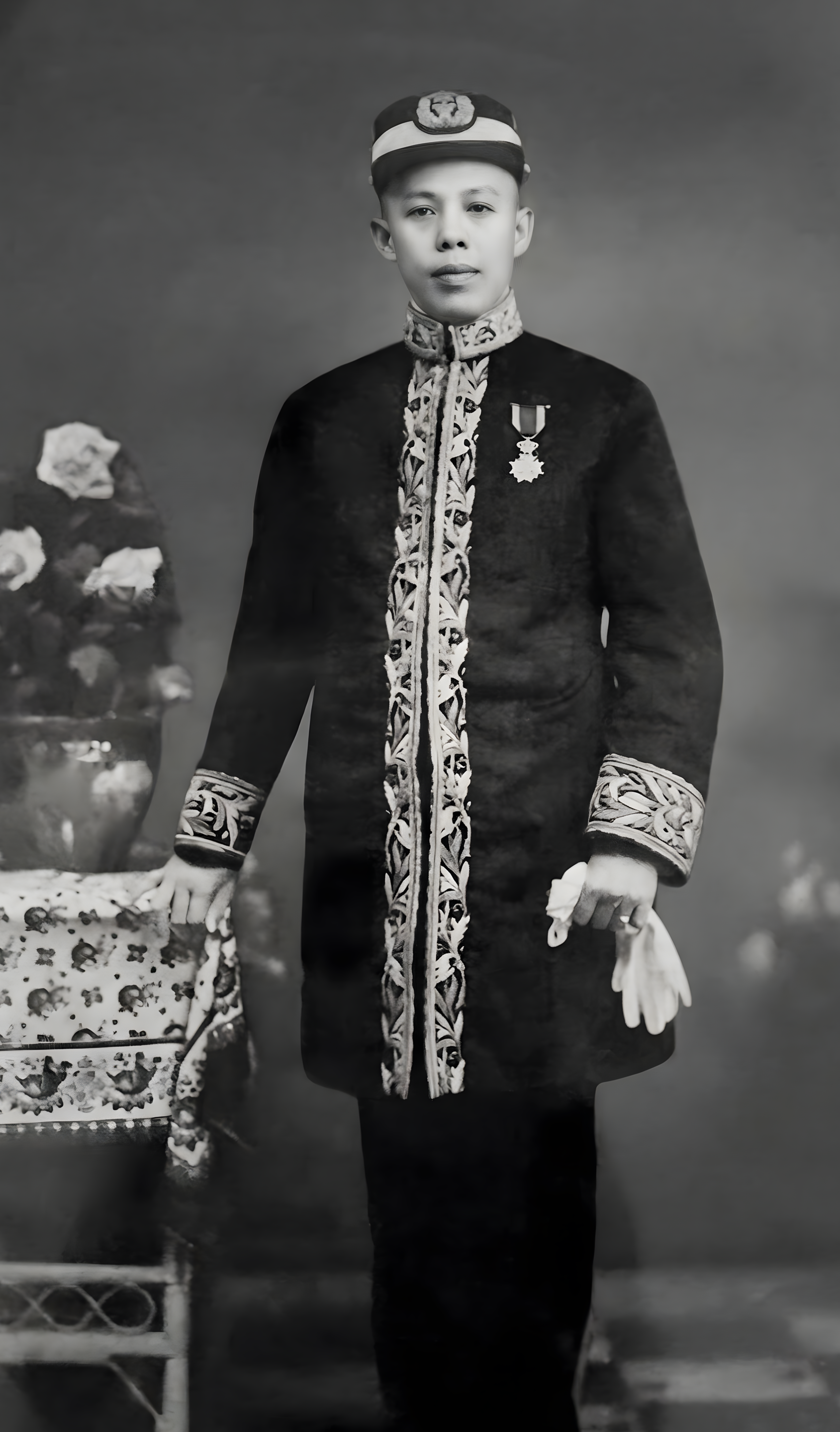
- Born: August 20, 1879; Pontianak, West Kalimantan, Dutch East Indies
- Other names: TJIA Tjeng Siang 谢清祥
- Occupations: Community leader, businessman, Chinese officer (Kapitein and Majoor)
- Years active: 1911–1935
- Known for: Appointed kapitein (1911) and later majoor in Pontianak; member of the Volksraad (1927–1935) representing the Politiek Economische Bond (PEB)
- Website: Openarchieven.cl; Onsland.nl

Tjia Tjeng Siang (謝清祥; born 20 August 1879 – date of death unknown) was a Chinese-Indonesian community leader, businessman, and official in the Dutch East Indies who served as Kapitein der Chinezen and later Majoor der Chinezen in Pontianak. He also served as a member of the Volksraad of the Dutch East Indies, representing the Politiek Economische Bond (PEB). Tjia was regarded as one of the influential Chinese figures in West Kalimantan in the early 20th century.

== Early life ==
Tjia Tjeng Siang was born in Pontianak on 20 August 1879. He attended the Europeesche Lagere School (ELS), a Dutch-language primary school. He also held a "diploma for minor civil servant", which qualified him for lower-level civil service positions within the administrative structure of the Dutch East Indies.

== Career ==
Tjia began his early career as a clerk in the Department of the Interior of the Dutch East Indies administration in Borneo (Kalimantan). He later held various administrative positions within the government.

In 1911, he was appointed Kapitein der Chinezen in Pontianak, a position within the Chinese officer system under the Dutch East Indies system of indirect rule. He was later promoted to Majoor der Chinezen, the highest rank within the Chinese officer hierarchy at the time.

On 16 May 1927, Tjia was inaugurated as a member of the Volksraad, the legislative council of the Dutch East Indies, representing the Politiek Economische Bond (PEB). He served until 1935. In recognition of his service in government and community affairs, he was awarded a medal of distinction by the Dutch government.

== Honours ==
- Order of Orange-Nassau

== See also ==
- Majoor der Chinezen
- Kapitein der Chinezen
- Volksraad
- Chinese Indonesians
- Politiek Economische Bond
