= Sukarjo Wiryopranoto =

Indonesian National hero (1903–1962)

Sukarjo (Soekardjo) Wiryopranoto
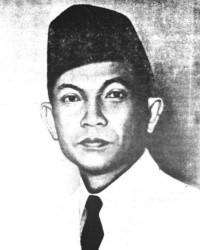

4th Representative of Indonesia to the United Nations
- In office 1960–1962
- Preceded by: Ali Sastroamidjojo
- Succeeded by: L.N Palar

2nd Indonesian Ambassador to China
- In office 1956–1960
- Preceded by: Arnold Mononutu
- Succeeded by: Sukarni

1st Indonesian Ambassador to Italy
- In office 1952–1954
- Preceded by: Office established
- Succeeded by: Sutan Mohammad Rasjid

1st Indonesian Ambassador to the Holy See
- In office 1950–1952
- Preceded by: Office established
- Succeeded by: Djumhana Wiriaatmadja

Personal details
- Born: 5 June 1903 Kesugihan, Cilacap, Dutch East Indies
- Died: 23 October 1962 (aged 59) New York City, U.S

Sukarjo Wiryopranoto, also known as Soekardjo Wirjopranoto (5 June 1903 – 23 October 1962), was a politician, diplomat, and prominent figure in the Indonesian nationalist movement. In 1962, he was posthumously awarded the country's highest honour, recognised as a National Hero of Indonesia.

== Biography ==
Soekardjo was born in the Cilacap region of central Java in 1903, the son of a railway worker. In 1923, he graduated from the Jakarta Law College, and secured a role at the Purwokerto District Court. He then worked in several cities before setting up his own law office called 'Vishnu' in Malang, East Java.

Soekardjo become a member of the Volksraad in 1931. He also co-founded the National Association of Indonesia with Dr. Sutomo, Soekardjo was a strong advocate for Indonesia's independence from the Netherlands, and was a senior figure of the Indonesian political party Parindra. He was also chief editor of weekly publication Mimbar Indonesia.

Following Indonesia's independence in 1947, Soekardjo was appointed a spokesperson for the newly formed Indonesian Cabinet of Ministers, led by President Sukarno. He subsequently served as Indonesia's first Envoy to the Vatican in 1950, and then Indonesia's first Ambassador to Italy in 1952. He also served as Indonesia's Permanent Representative at the United Nations (UN) until his death in October 1962.

== Death and legacy ==
Soekardjo died of a heart attack, at age 59, after a short illness at Mount Sinai Hospital in New York City. He is buried in Kalibata Heroes' Cemetery, Jakarta.

A major thoroughfare in central Jakarta, Jalan Sukarjo Wiryopranoto, is named in his memory.

In 2024, Soekardjo's Lepas dari Belanda ('Free from the Netherlands'), first published in 1946, was republished by the Tjilatjap History Community, which outlined Soekardjo's opposition to the Dutch Linggajati agreement of the same year.
