= Paul Alex Blaauw =

Dutch East Indies politician

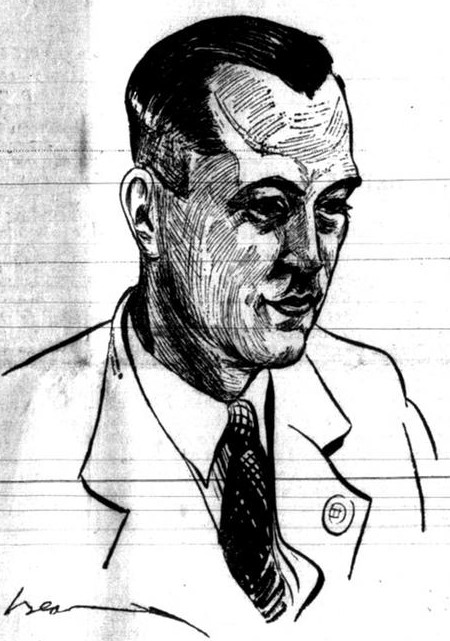
P.A. Blaauw portrait from De Indische Courant 1941

Paul Alex Blaauw, usually known as P. A. Blaauw, was an Indo politician, lawyer, and member of the Dutch East Indies Volksraad representing the Indo Europeesch Verbond from the 1920s to the 1940s. During the period of transition to Indonesian independence and the 1949 Dutch–Indonesian Round Table Conference he was a leader of the largest faction advocating for the rights of Indos.

== Biography ==
=== Early life ===
Blaauw was born in Ambarawa, Central Java, Dutch East Indies on 3 June 1891. His father, Michiel Frederik Blaauw was born in Bemmel, Netherlands; his mother was named Jeanna Louise Smit. After graduating from a Hogere Burgerschool, Blaauw traveled to the Netherlands in 1913 where he enrolled in the Law program at Leiden University. He was married in Rotterdam in 1916 to his wife Wilhelmine Diderika Robertson. He finished his Doctorate in Law in 1919.

=== Legal and political career ===
In 1920, he returned to the Indies and took up a civil servant (ambtenaar) post in the Department of Justice. In May 1927 he was elected to the Volksraad for the Indo Europeesch Verbond. He continued to hold the post through the 1930s and until the Japanese invasion in 1942.

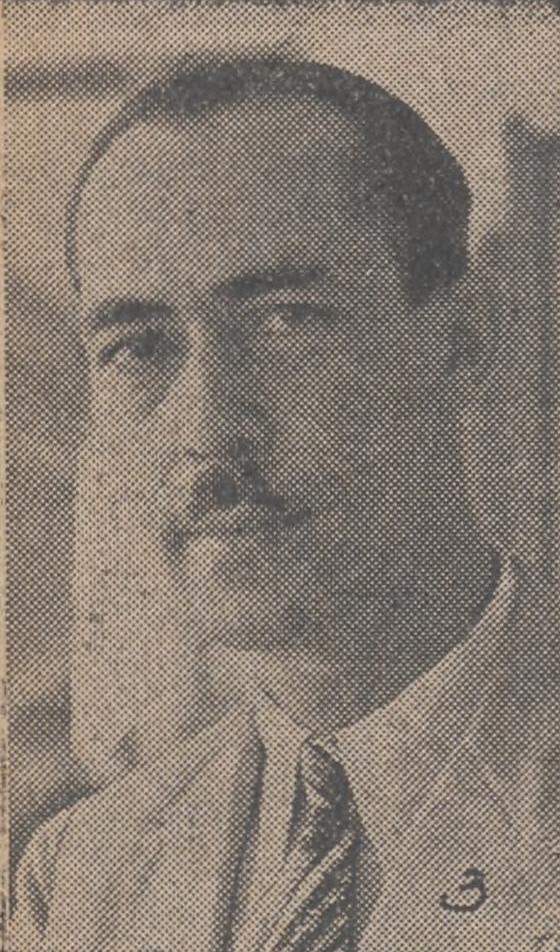
P. A. Blaauw, Dutch East Indies Volksraad member, 1935

He resigned from the Indo Europeesch Verbond in 1947, citing irreconcilable differences between his views and those of the current leadership of the party.

During the Dutch–Indonesian Round Table Conference in 1949 he was one of the leaders of a faction representing Dutch and Indo people in the talks. His faction, which was by far the largest, was also led by J. H. Schijfsma and J. Verboom and represented the right-wing Grooter Nederland Actie (Greater Netherlands Action), New Guinea settlement organizations, and the organization of former prisoners of war (NIBEG). (Of the other two smaller Indo factions at the talks, one represented the Eurasian League, and the other was a tiny faction representing the pro-Indonesian Indo Nationale Partij.) Blaauw and his faction felt they were ignored during the talks, and so they refused to attend the final meeting out of protest.

After Indonesia achieved its independence from the Netherlands, he resigned from the civil service and traveled to Europe in December 1949. There he continued to advocate for Indos and Dutch people living in Indonesia, working a leader of an organization called the Vereniging van Indische Nederlanders (Association of Indies Dutch). He was also active in organizations working to ensure continued Dutch control over Netherlands New Guinea. Around 1960 he was active in another organization, NASSI (Nationale Actie Steunt Spijtoptanten Indonesië), which was chaired by William Lemaire, a fellow Indo lawyer who had been a Catholic National Party member of parliament in the Netherlands and had since become a professor at Leiden University. The purpose of that organization was to support Dutch and Indo people still living in Indonesia, and to expedite their relocation to the Netherlands if necessary.
