= Soetomo =

Indonesian physician and nationalist (1888–1938)

Raden Soetomo
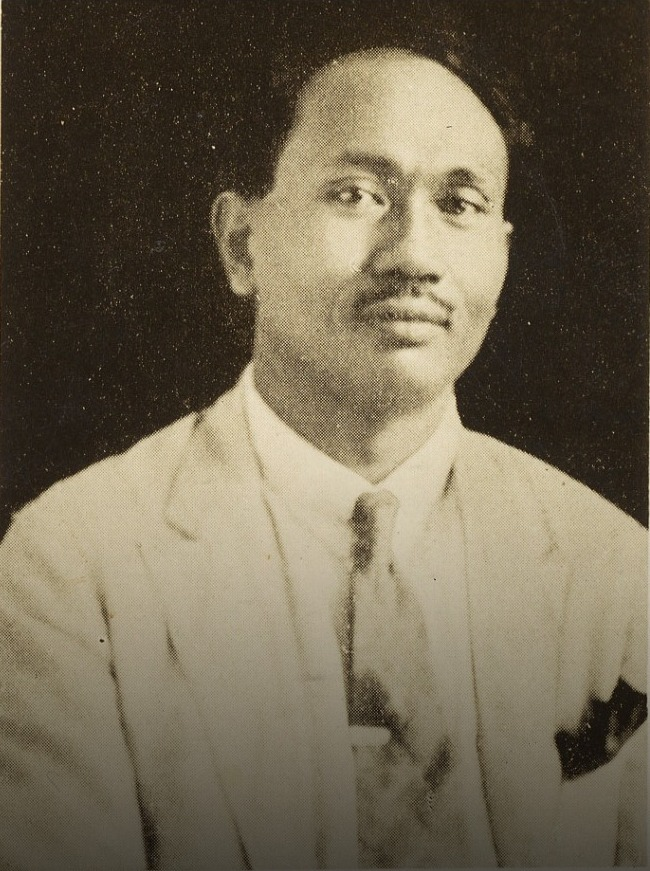
- Portrait, date unknown

Chairman of the Great Indonesia Party
- In office 24 December 1935 – 30 May 1938
- Preceded by: Office created
- Succeeded by: Woerjaningrat

Personal details
- Born: Soebroto; 30 July 1888 Ngepeh, Loceret, Kediri Residency, Dutch East Indies
- Died: 30 May 1938 (aged 49) Surabaya, Dutch East Indies
- Party: Great Indonesia Party
- Spouse: Everdina Broering (m. 1917; died 1934)
- Education: Amsterdam University
- Occupation: Physician; professor

Soetomo (born Soebroto; 30 July 1888 – 30 May 1938) was an Indonesian physician and nationalist. He was the co-founder of Boedi Oetomo, the first native political society in the Dutch East Indies, and led the Great Indonesia Party (Parindra) from 1935 until his death. Soetomo was declared a national hero by President Sukarno in 1961.

== Biography ==
He was born in East Java, and went on to study medicine. While still studying, he was one of three founders of the Boedi Oetomo Javanese nationalist organisation. From 1919 to 1923, studied medicine at Amsterdam University and later married a Dutch woman. After returning from the Netherlands, he worked as a doctor in Sumatra and Surabaya. He also established a number of "study clubs" to raise awareness of nationalism. In 1935, he was one of the founders of Parindra, and led it until his death. After his death he was named a National Hero of Indonesia.
