= Mohammad Husni Thamrin =

Indonesian politician and nationalist (1894–1941)

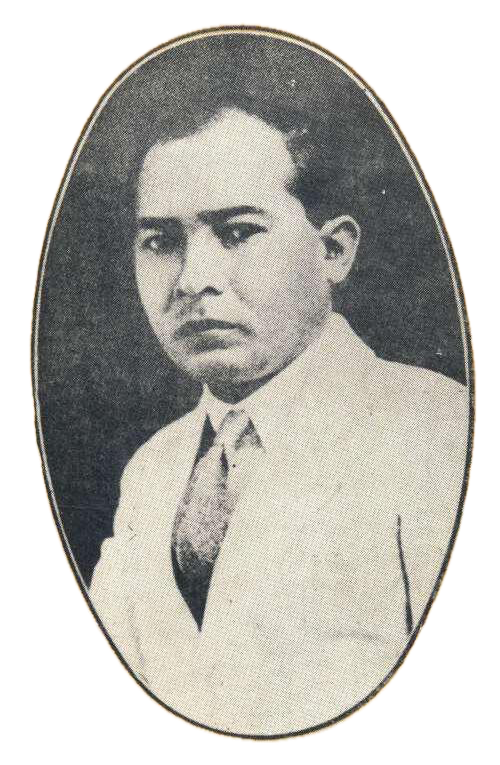
- Portrait, c. date unknown

Member of the Volksraad
- In office 16 May 1927 – 11 January 1941
- Succeeded by: Samsoeddin

Personal details
- Born: 16 February 1894 Batavia, Dutch East Indies (now Jakarta, Indonesia)
- Died: 11 January 1941 (aged 46) Batavia, Dutch East Indies (now Jakarta, Indonesia)
- Resting place: Karet Bivak Cemetery
- Party: Parindra (1935–1941)
- Awards: National Hero of Indonesia

Mohammad Husni Thamrin (Note: Also spelled as Mohammad Hoesni Thamrin under the Van Ophuijsen Spelling System.) (16 February 1894 – 11 January 1941), popularly known as MH Thamrin, was an Indonesian politician and nationalist who served in the Volksraad from 1927 until his death in 1941. He was one of the founders of Parindra and was a leader in the Indonesian Political Federation, advocating for Indonesian independence. After his death, he was honored as a National Hero of Indonesia.

== Early life and beginning of political career ==
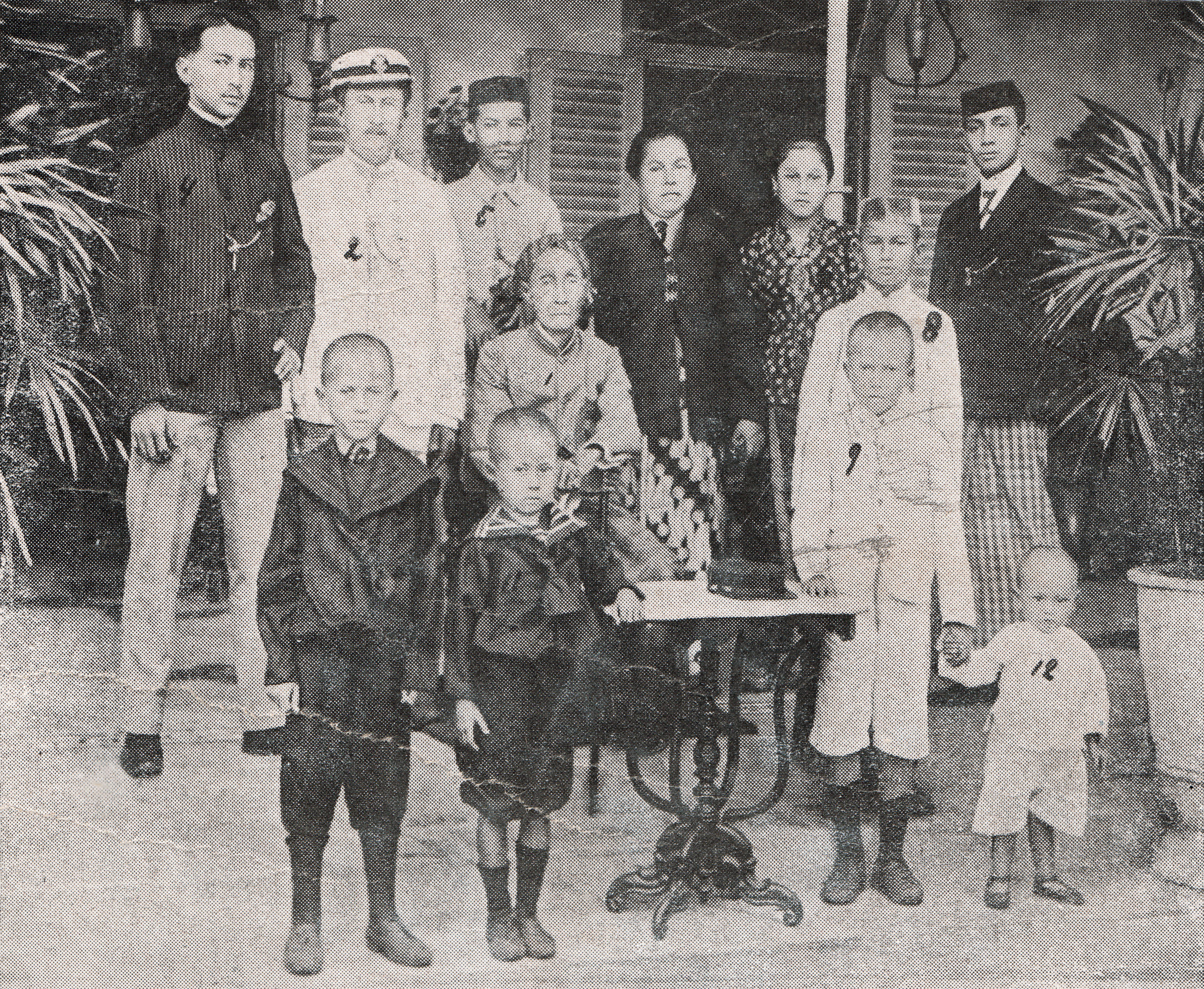
Family of MH Thamrin, 1912

Thamrin was born in Weltevreden, Batavia (modern-day Jakarta), Dutch East Indies, on 16 February 1894. His father, Thamrin Mohd. Tabri, was the son by his Indonesian mistress of an English businessman who owned the Hotel Ort in Batavia. Tabri was subsequently adopted and raised by his Javanese uncle. Thamrin was therefore born into a neo-priyayi class and in 1906, his father became district head (wedana) under Governor General Johan Cornelis van der Wijck. After graduating from Koning Willem III Gymnasium, Thamrin took several government jobs before working for ten years for the shipping company Koninklijke Paketvaart-Maatschappij.

In 1919, Thamrin was elected a member of the Jakarta City Council, and in 1929, became second deputy mayor. In 1927 he was appointed by Governor-General de Graeff to the Volksraad. He was appointed again in 1931 and elected in 1935 and 1939.

== Nationalist activism ==
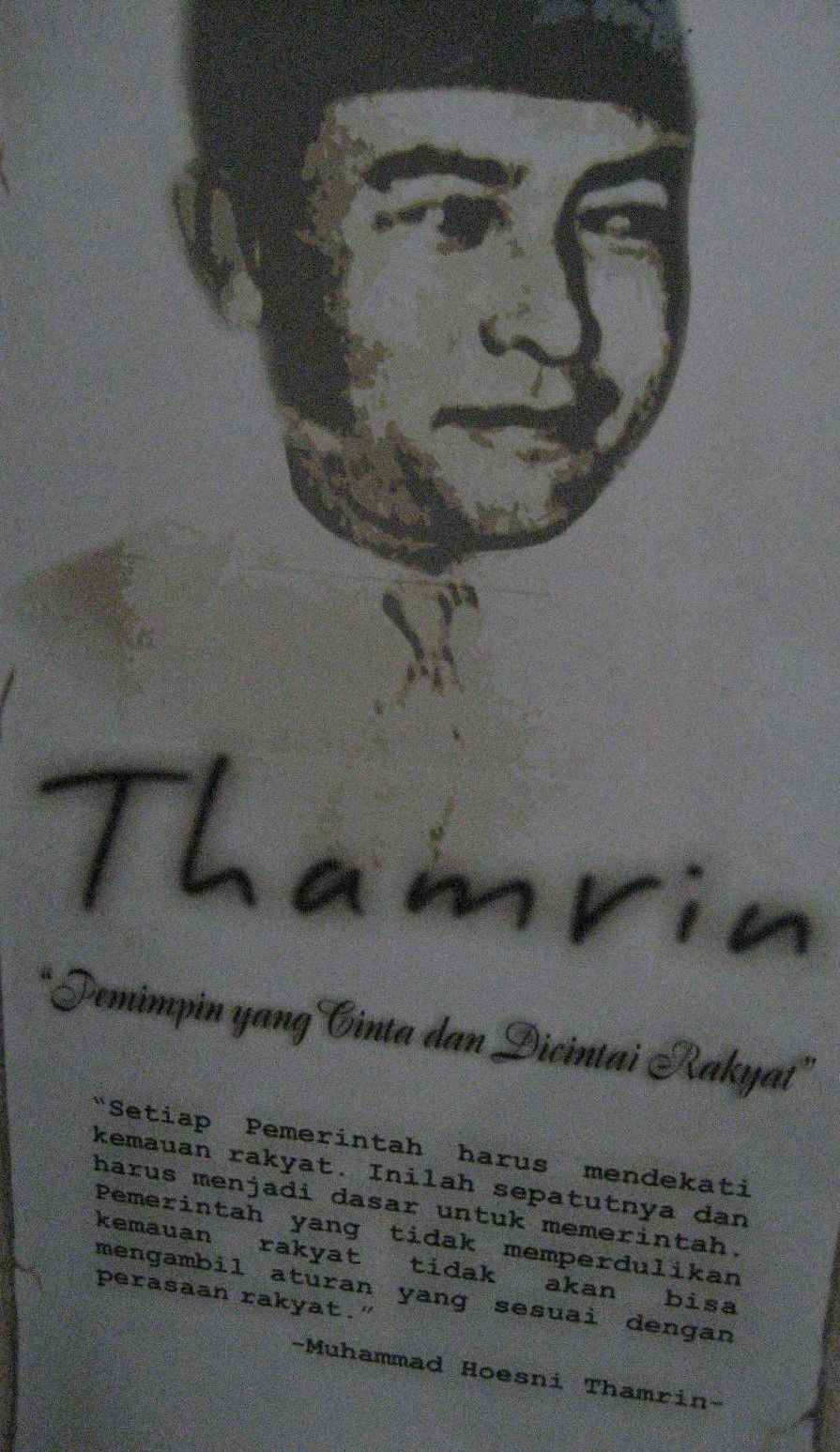
Mohammad Husni Thamrin Indonesian nationalist and political thinker 1941

On 27 January 1930, Thamrin made a speech in the Volksraad announcing the formation of the Nationalist Fraction (Fraksi Nasional) to unite ten Indonesian nationalists under one flag. This was partly in response to the December 1929 arrests of Indonesian nationalist Sukarno and members of his Indonesian National Party and partly to counteract the reactionary Fatherlands Club (Vaderlandsche Club), which wanted to maintain Dutch control over the East Indies in perpetuity. The aim of the faction was Indonesian autonomy, which was to be achieved through political reforms. The faction would use "all legal means" to achieve this goal.

Thamrin put forward several motions, including one to remove the power of the governor-general to exile political enemies of the state. He realized that cooperating with the colonial regime offered a different way to oppose it, and he took full advantage of his immunity to prosecution conferred by his membership of the Volksraad. As a result, he was widely despised, but also feared, by Dutch conservatives. As Volksraad members, Thamrin and Kusumom Utoyo went to eastern Sumatra to look into working conditions at plantations there. Disgusted by what they found, upon his return Thamrin gave a speech condemning the plantation owners. He also examined conditions in Glodok prison in Batavia and reported to the press on the very cruel and unsanitary conditions in it. He criticised the legalised gambling and corporal punishment handed down for minor offences. In 1935 he was a founding member of the Great Indonesia Party (Parindra).

In July 1936, Volksraad member Soetardjo Kartohadikusumo, who was not a member of the National Fraction, put forward a petition asking the Dutch to convene a conference to discuss autonomy for the Dutch East Indies. Although Thamrin did not sign the petition, as he took the view that its provisions would continue the exploitation of Indonesians, he was one of six National Fraction members who voted for it in the Volksraad debate on 26 September because the proposed conference could result in Indonesian autonomy. Two years later, the Dutch parliament rejected the petition.

After the death of Dr. Soetomo in 1938, Thamrin became deputy chair of Parindra. In a meeting of the Volksraad in 1939, Thamrin proposed that the Dutch terms Nederlands Indie, Nederlands Indisch, and Inlander (Dutch Indies, Dutch Indian, and Dutch Indians) be replaced with the nationalist terms Indonesia, Indonesisch, and Indonesia (Indonesia, Indonesian, and Indonesians). Although this received majority support in the Volksraad, the Dutch government vetoed the motion. After his request, the colonial government kept him under surveillance. By 1940, his proposal for the use of the term Indonesian had begun to receive consideration, much to Thamrin's perplexity.

In May 1939, Thamrin spearheaded an effort to unite eight nationalist organisations, including Parindra, in the Indonesian Political Federation (Gaboengan Politiek Indonesia, or GAPI). The group had four main goals: Indonesian self-determination, national unity, a democratically elected party answering to the Indonesian people, and solidarity between Indonesians and the Dutch to combat fascism.

== Arrest and death ==
On 6 January 1941, Thamrin's house was searched by the Political Intelligence Service (PID) as he had come under suspicion for supplying information to the Empire of Japan; he had previously maintained warm relations with Japanese residents of the Indies. Already suffering from severe diabetes, he died of a heart attack five days after his arrest. Large numbers of people attended his funeral, including the president of the Volksraad, who led a group of its members. Thamrin was buried in Karet Bivak Cemetery, Central Jakarta.

== Legacy ==
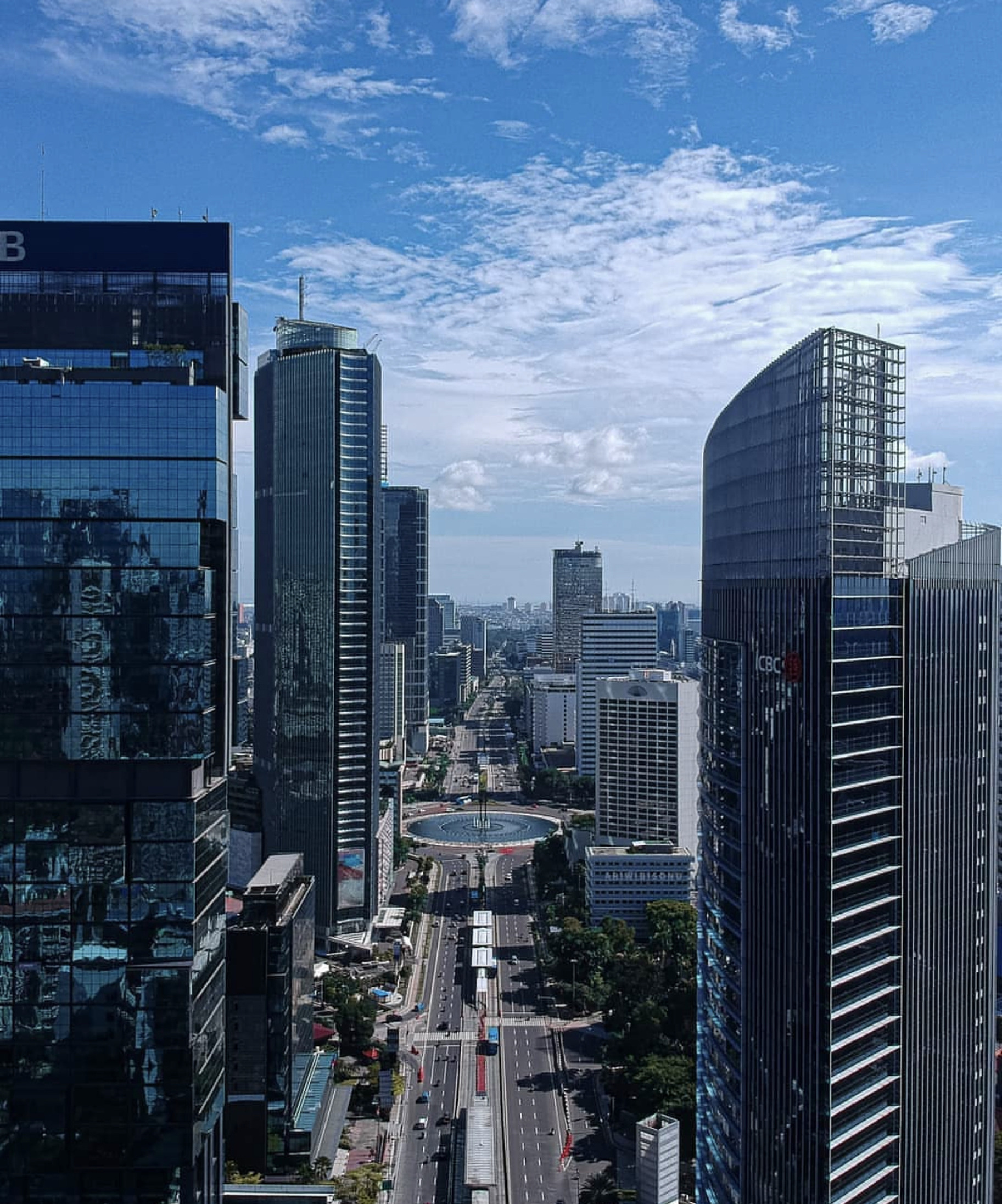
Jalan M.H. Thamrin

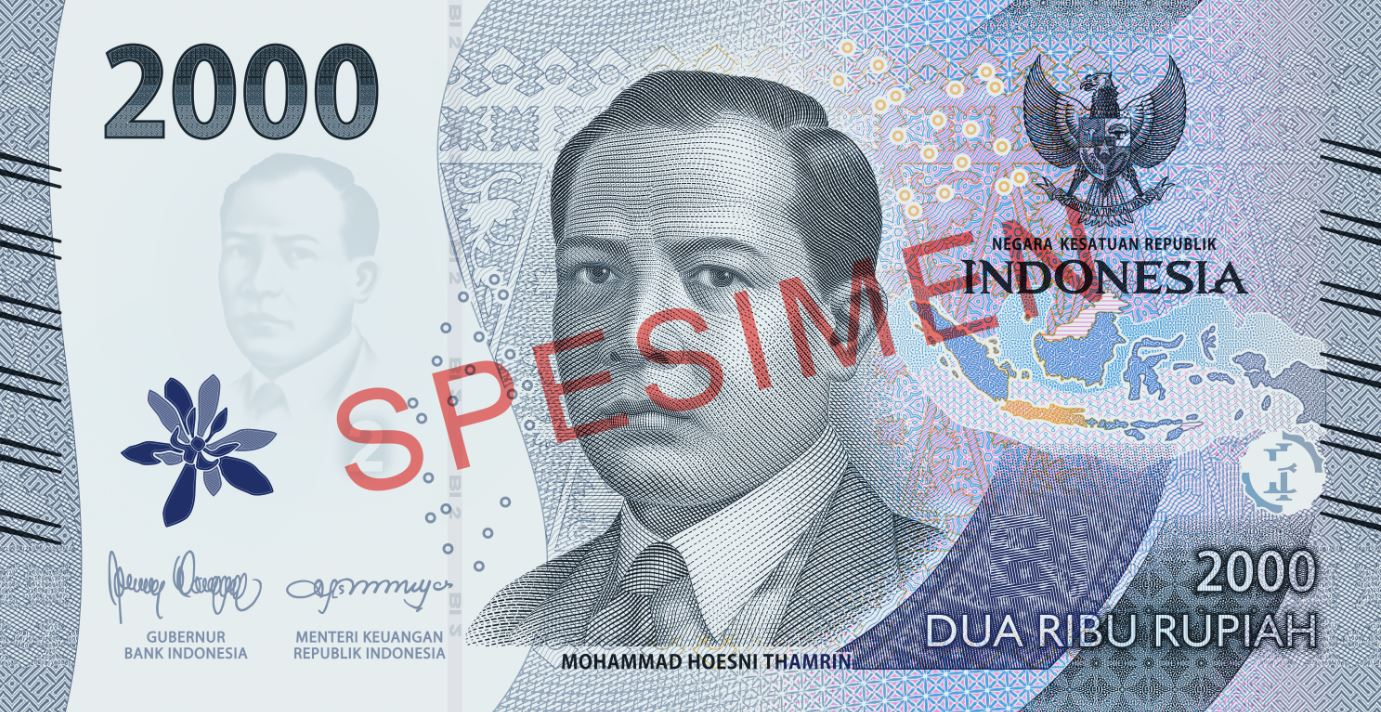
2,000 rupiah banknote featuring Mohammad Husni Thamrin, issued in 2022

Thamrin was declared a National Hero of Indonesia in 1964.

Thamrin has several objects named after him, including Jalan M.H. Thamrin, a thoroughfare in Central Jakarta, and Mohammad Husni Thamrin School for the Gifted, a school in East Jakarta for students with an IQ of more than 120. His old home on Kenari Street in Senen, Central Jakarta, is now a museum dedicated to his life. Two statues of Thamrin have been erected in Jakarta: a bust near the National Monument and a full-body statue in front of the Thamrin Museum.

He is also depicted in the 2016 and 2022 series of the 2,000 Indonesian rupiah banknotes.

Thamrin MRT station, a station of Jakarta MRT located in Jalan M.H. Thamrin, is also named after him. The station, which will be a transit station between North–South Line and East–West Line, is currently under construction.
