= 1927 Dutch East Indies Volksraad election =

- 1927
- 37 of the 60 seats in the Volksraad; 31 seats needed for a majority
Party	Seats	+/–
Moderate right-wing	36	+8
Moderate left-wing	9	−1
Left-wing	9	+4
Right-wing	6	+1
This lists parties that won seats. See the complete results below.
Composition of the Volksraad following the 1927 election

Elections to the Volksraad were held in the Dutch East Indies in 1927.

== Electoral system ==
The Volksraad had a total of 60 members, 37 of which were elected and 21 appointed. Seats were also assigned to ethnic groups, with 30 for the Dutch population (15 elected, 15 appointed), 25 for the native population (19 elected, 4 appointed) and five for the Chinese population (3 elected, 2 appointed).

== Results ==
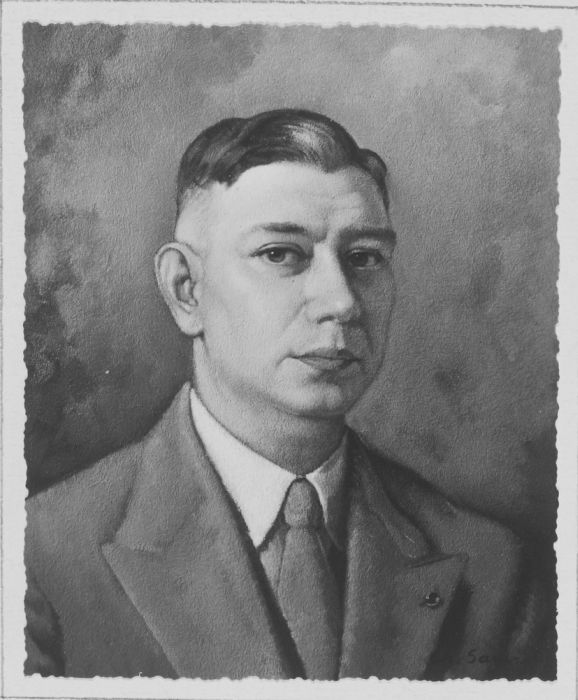
Portrait of W.H. van Helsdingen, Chairman of the Volksraad in 1927. Later replaced by Meyer Ranneft in 1929.

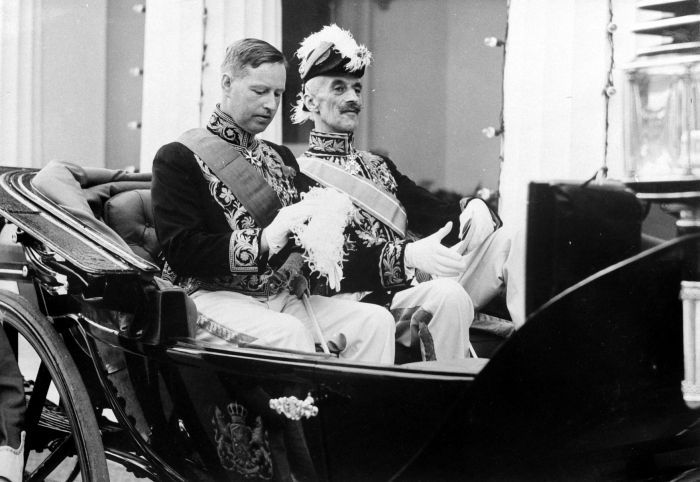
The new Governor-General Tjarda van Starkenborgh Stachouwer leaves the Volksraad building where the transfer of administration took place together with the recently resigned G.G. B.C. de Jonge (1937)

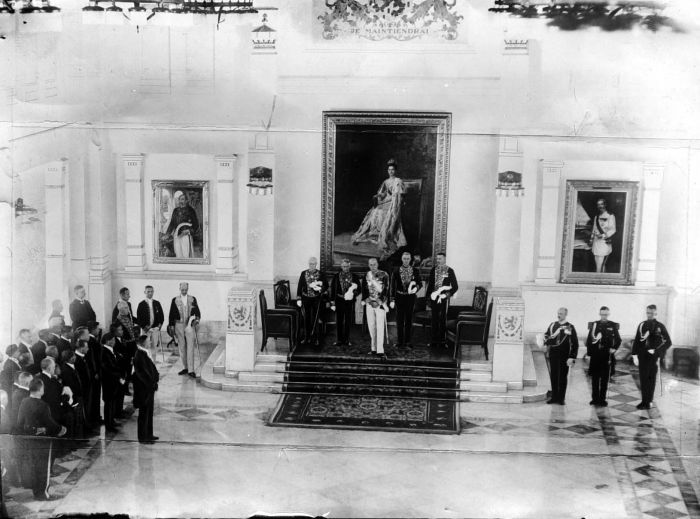
Governor-General De Graaf answers the speech of the chairman of the Volksraad Meyer Ranneft, who comes to offer congratulations "from the population" in 1929. Most radical Indonesians withdrew from the Volksraad in 1923.

Grouping	Seats	+/–
Moderate right-wing	36	+8
Moderate left-wing	9	–1
Left-wing	9	+4
Right-wing	6	+1
Total	60	+12
Source: Schmutzer
