= 1921 Dutch East Indies Volksraad election =

- 1921
- 27 of the 48 seats in the Volksraad; 25 seats needed for a majority
Party	Seats	+/–
Moderate right-wing	27	+15
Moderate left-wing	14	+4
Left-wing	5	−3
Right-wing	2	−6
This lists parties that won seats. See the complete results below.

Elections to the Volksraad were held in the Dutch East Indies in 1921. The result was a victory for the Political Economic Union.

== Electoral system ==
The Volksraad had a total of 48 members, half of which were elected and half appointed. Seats were also assigned to ethnic groups, with 25 for the Dutch population (twelve elected, thirteen appointed), 20 for the native population (twelve elected, eight appointed) and three for the Chinese population (all of which were appointed).

== Results ==
Grouping	Seats	+/–
Moderate right-wing	27	+15
Moderate left-wing	14	+4
Left-wing	5	–3
Right-wing	2	–6
Total	48	+10
Source: Schmutzer
