= 1931 Dutch East Indies Volksraad election =

- 1931
- 38 of the 60 seats in the Volksraad; 31 seats needed for a majority
Party	Seats	+/–
Moderate right-wing	24	−12
Moderate left-wing	14	+5
Left-wing	12	+3
Right-wing	10	+4
This lists parties that won seats. See the complete results below.
Composition of the Volksraad following the 1931 elections

Elections to the Volksraad were held in the Dutch East Indies in 1931.

== Electoral system ==
The Volksraad had a total of 60 members, 38 of which were elected and 22 appointed. Seats were also assigned to ethnic groups, with 25 for the Dutch population (15 elected, 10 appointed), 30 for the native population (20 elected, 10 appointed) and five for the Chinese population (3 elected, 2 appointed).

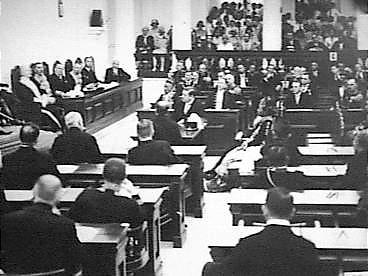
Last opening of the 1930 Volksraad by outgoing Governor-General A.C.D. de Graeff, prior to the 1931 election

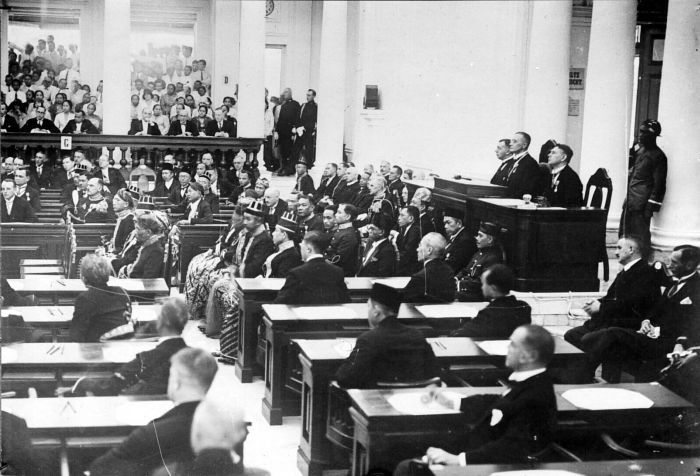

== Results ==
Grouping	Seats	+/–
Moderate right-wing	24	–12
Moderate left-wing	14	+5
Left-wing	12	+3
Right-wing	10	+4
Total	60	0
Source: Schmutzer
