= Volksraad (Dutch East Indies) =

Advisory semilegislative council in the Dutch East Indies

People's Council Volksraad

Type
- Type: Unicameral

History
- Established: 18 May 1918
- Disbanded: 1942
- Succeeded by: Chūō Sangi-in; Central Indonesian National Committee

Leadership
- Chairman: W. H. Van Helsdingen
- Seats: 38 members (1917); 48 members (1924); 60 members (1939)

Meeting place
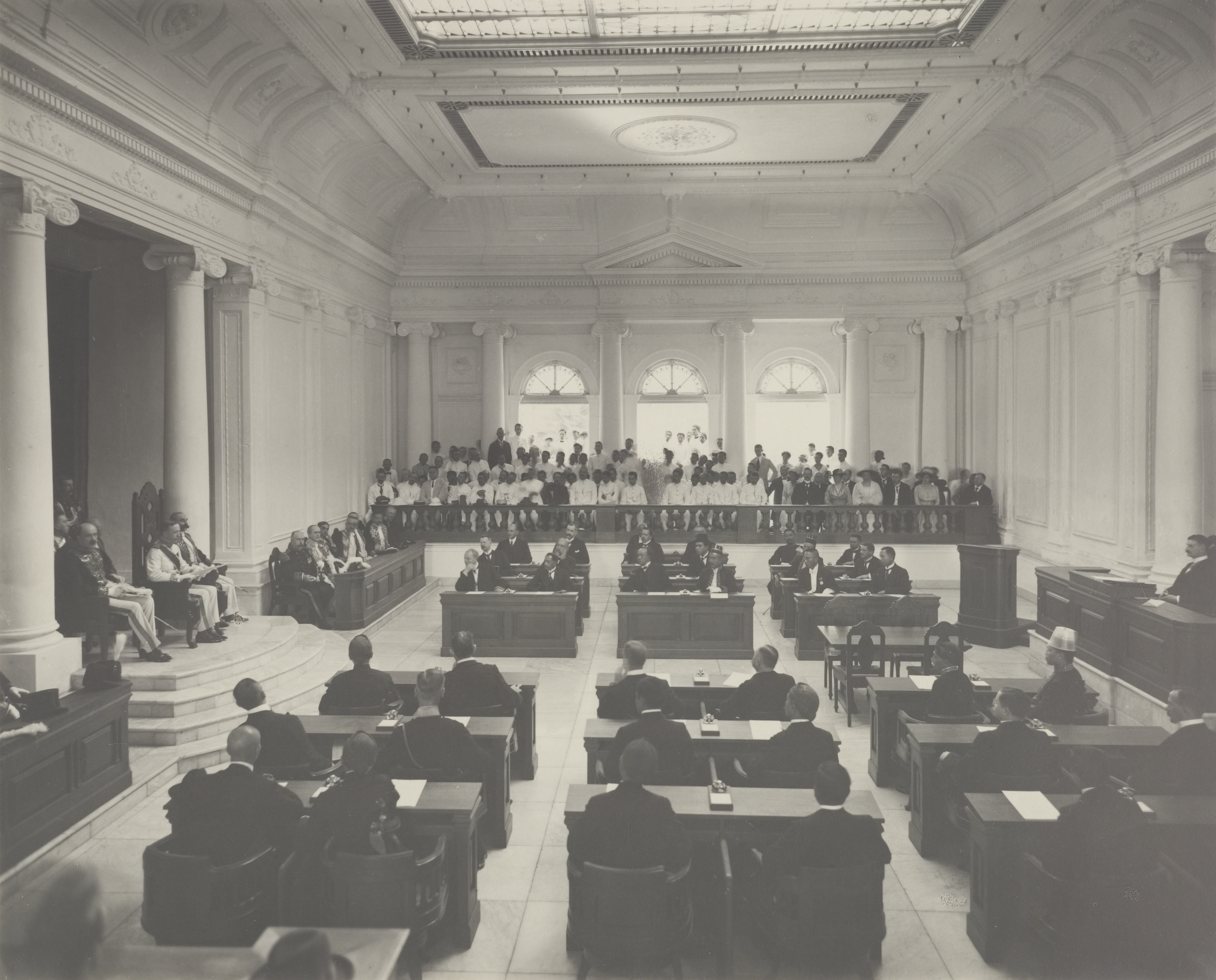
- Volksraadgebouw (1918)

The Volksraad (People's Council) was an advisory, and later semi-legislative institution for the Dutch East Indies, provided for by law in 1916 but only established with the actual installation of the Council in 1918. It was a hesitant and slow attempt at democratisation of the Dutch East Indies as part of the "ethical policy" adopted by the Dutch government. The power of the Volksraad was limited as it only had advisory powers. Although part of the council was elected, only a small proportion of the population had voting rights.

Initially, the Volksraad had 39 members, eventually rising to 60. It was reconstituted every four years. The members were partly elected, and partly appointed by the colonial administration.

== Background ==
The idea of a representative body in the Dutch East Indies arose partly because of the Ethical Policy implemented by the Dutch government as part of a move away from simple exploration of the colony towards expressing concern for the Indonesian people and their wellbeing. During World War I, the Dutch became worried about a possible Japanese threat to the East Indies. Given the small size of the local Dutch forces available for defense, the colonial authorities asked Indonesian leaders if Indonesians would be willing to be drafted into military service. The Indonesian Budi Utomo political society supported the idea of a militia, but the Sarekat Islam political organization rejected this idea, refusing to fight for a colony in which they had no legislative representation. Budi Utomo came around to this view by 1915. In 1916-1917 a group comprising delegates from Budi Utomo, Sarekat Islam, and the Union of Regents as well as from regions of Java travelled around the Netherlands campaigning for representation and pleaded their case with Queen Wilhelmina. Although the Dutch refused to consider any power sharing, they realized that limited concessions might be necessary, and on 16 December 1916, following a proposal from Colonial Affairs Minister Thomas Bastiaan Pleyte, a Wet (Dutch law) was passed establishing an advisory body without any legislative powers, the Volksraad.

In early 1918, the Volksraad election results were announced. Abdul Muis (Sarekat Islam) and Abdoel Rivai (Insulinde) were elected, but most of the other elected Indonesian members were government officials, not party members. Governor-General of the Dutch East Indies Johan Paul, Count van Limburg Stirum was unhappy with this outcome as he wanted more radical Indonesians in the Volksraad so they could be tamed. He used his authority to appoint other members including Tjokroaminoto (Sarekat Islam) and Tjipto Mangoenkoesoemo (Insulinde).

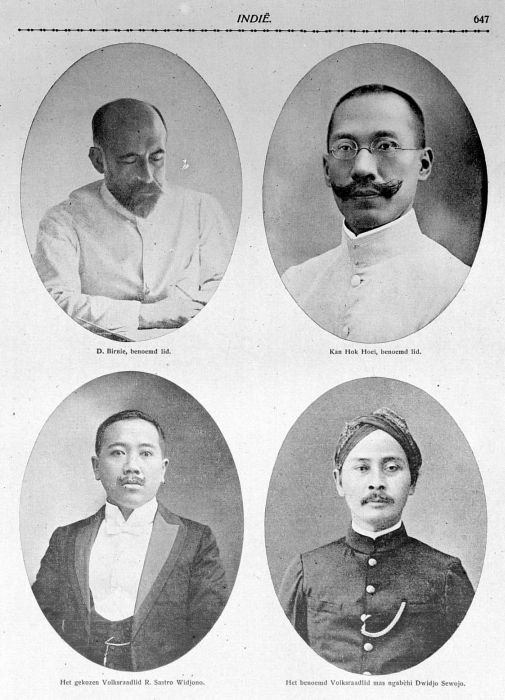
Volksraad members in 1918: D. Birnie (appointed), Kan Hok Hoei (appointed), R. Sastro Widjono (elected) and Mas Ngabehi Dwidjo Sewojo (appointed)

== Formation and actions ==
The Volksraad was officially founded in Weltevreden, Batavia, Java, on 18 May 1918 by the Governor-General of the Dutch East Indies, Johan Paul, Count van Limburg Stirum (1873–1948). The building used for the Volksraad, built by the Dutch in 1830, is on Jalan Pejambon in Central Jakarta. In 1945 it was used for meetings of the Investigating Committee for Preparatory Work for Independence. As future president Sukarno gave his famous Pancasila speech there, it is now known as the Pancasila Building (Indonesian: Gedung Pancasila).

There were two short Volksraad sessions every year. In its first session, which opened on 21 May 1918, Jacob Christiaan Koningsberger was elected chairman for 1918–1919. A motion to send a "loyal cable" to the Queen of the Netherlands was rejected, while another allowing debates to be conducted in Malay was passed. In the second session that year, in November, the 'Radicale Concentratie' was established as a faction. Through it, Tjokroaminito called for the Volksraad to become more than just an advisory body, but a representative body for the people of the Dutch East Indies, especially native Indonesians. The strong criticism of the colonial administration from both Indonesian and Dutch members, especially given the turbulent political events in Europe at the time, caused so much concern that in November Governor-General van Limburg Stirum addressed the Volksraad and promised extensive administrative reforms. This motivated Indonesian nationalist figures and Tjoroaminoto immediately organised members and put forward a motion for the government to immediately bring about the major changes promised to the political system and governance of the East Indies. The motion, proposed by the 'Radicale Concentratie' called on the administration to

1. immediately establish an elected parliament with the right to pass laws
2. work with domestic political organisations
3. establish a new government acceptable to the Volksraad before 1921

The Dutch government established a commission headed by Professor Carpentier Alting to study the motion. Based on the advice of this commission, the motion was rejected almost two years later in 1920. The unkept promises from the governor-general subsequently became known bitterly as the "November promises". Abdul Muis no longer saw any point in the Volksraad and resigned in 1921. Agus Salim replaced him.

In 1927 the Volksraad was made a co-legislative body, but the governor-general retained a veto. The main use of the Volksraad for the Dutch was a means for them to learn the opinions of Indonesians, while Indonesian nationalist members could inform the public about their aspirations. That same year, Mohammad Husni Thamrin was appointed a member. He established a 'National Faction' with a declared aim of full independence for Indonesia. Meanwhile, Indonesian nationalist Sukarno established the Indonesian National Party (PNI) and adopted a strategy of non-cooperation with the colonial authorities.

Meanwhile, National Faction members had become increasingly concerned about the repressive actions taken against Sukarno and the PNI leadership, which included monitoring and raids on their homes by the colonial police. Thamrin called these acts a "provocation". The administration protested about the use of this term and asked Thamrin to retract it. After the arrests of PNI leadership in 1929, the pro-independence members toughened their stance, culminating in the Soetardjo Petition, submitted by progressive members led by Soetardjo Kartohadikusumo on 15 July 1936. It called for autonomy for Indonesia as part of a Dutch commonwealth within ten years. Following a debate, the Volksraad accepted the petition by 26 votes to 20, with 15 abstentions. Among those voting against were six Indonesians, and the petition was only approved after Soetardjo's removal of the ten-year deadline persuaded the Dutch five-member Political Economic League faction to support it. On 16 November 1938, the Dutch government officially rejected the petition, claiming its contents were unclear and that its demands were at odds with the existing system of government. Indonesians then began to mock the Volksraad by deriding it using the Indonesian expression "Volk Sekarat", meaning "The People are at Death's Door". This was a reference to the dire economic circumstances Indonesians were enduring as a result of the economic depression.

On 21 May 1939, eight nationalist organizations, including parties represented in the Volksraad came together to form the Indonesian Political Federation. In September 1940, GAPI asked the Dutch government, then in exile in London as a result of the German invasion of the Netherlands, for a Dutch-Indonesian union and a fully-elected Volksraad. As a result of demands both from within and outside the Volksraad, on 14 September 1940, the Dutch established a seven-man Commission to Study Changes to Administration headed by Council of the Indies (Dutch) member F.H. Visman to hold discussions with and listen to the demands of Indonesian nationalists. As well as Visman, the members were Judicial Director K.L.J Endgoven, Volksraad member T.G.S.G Moelia, Ong Swan Yoe, Council of the Indies member Soejono, Soepomo, and Professor Wertheim. The secretary was A.K. Pringgodigdo. Members met with well-known individuals seen as representing their main social and political streams. The Visman Commission published its report in 1942, only a few weeks before the Japanese invasion, but the only concession granted was that the word "Indonesian" could henceforth be used instead of "Native" to refer to the people and the country.

In 1942, following the Japanese occupation, the Dutch government abolished the post of the governor-general and dissolved the Volksraad. Its role was taken over by a body comprising heads of departments. In September 1943, the Japanese authorities established the Central Advisory Council (Chuo Sangi-in) as a gesture towards popular representation for Indonesians.

== Membership ==
At the start, 15 of the 39 members were native-born Indonesians, with the other seats occupied by Europeans and "foreign orientals". In 1927 the total number of seats was increased to 60. Of the 30 native-born members, 20 were elected, and 10 were appointed.

In 1922, the Dutch constitution was revised to state that unless specially reserved, all authority was delegated to the East Indies, the constitution of which would also have to be revised and approved by the Dutch parliament. One result was that the three groups represented in the Volksraad, the Dutch, Indonesians, and other orientals, had separate elections for their representatives. This ensured the Indonesian representatives would not have a majority, thus protecting Dutch interests.

The term of office for Volksraad members was three years, in 1925 increased to four years. Famous Indo-European members included Karel Zaalberg and Dick de Hoog.

There were also representatives of the colony's Vreemde Oosterlingen, or 'Foreign Orientals', including Chinese members, such as Khouw Kim An, Majoor der Chinezen, H. H. Kan, Loa Sek Hie, and Phoa Liong Gie. Arab members included Abdullah bin Alwi Alatas.

Among prominent indigenous parliamentarians in the Volksraad were the Javanese Tjokroaminoto and Mohammad Husni Thamrin, the Ahmad Djajadiningrat, the Sumatrans Agus Salim and Mangaradja Soeangkoepon, and the Menadonese Sam Ratulangi.

The last Volksraad election was in 1939, although this was still an indirect process. One-tenth of the population chose 937 electors, and a further 515 were appointed by the colonial administration. The process resulted in eleven of the 19 Indonesian Volksraad members being active or former government officials. Dutch Governor-General van Starkenborgh wanted to appoint an Indonesian, Achmad Djajadiningrat, as chairman but was overruled by Dutch Minister of Colonial Affairs Charles Welter, who appointed Dutchman Jan Jonkman.

Year of election /appointment	Total seats	Elected	Appointed	Indonesians	Europeans	Other	Notes
1917	38	19	19	15	20	3	39 seats including the chairman
1921	48	24	24	20	25	3	"Other" was ethnic Chinese
1924	48	24	24	20	25	3	
1927	60	37	21	25	30	5	
1931	60	38	22	30	25	5	
1935	60	38	22	30	25	5	"Other" was ethnic Chinese and Arab
1939	60	38	22	30	25	5	
Sources: Schmutzer, Kahin

== Gallery ==
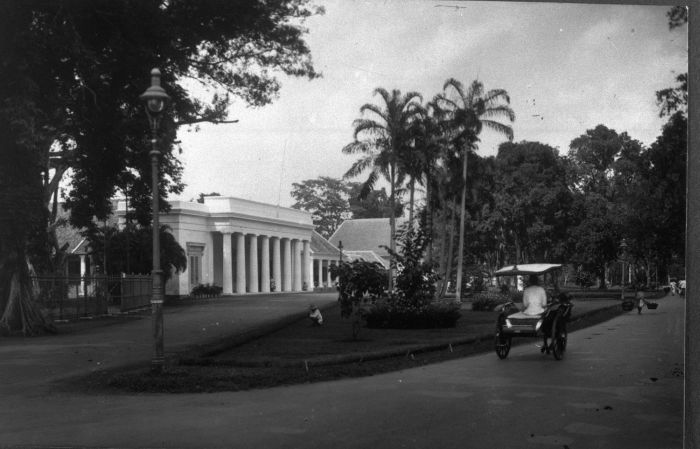
Volksraad building. Weltevreden, Batavia.

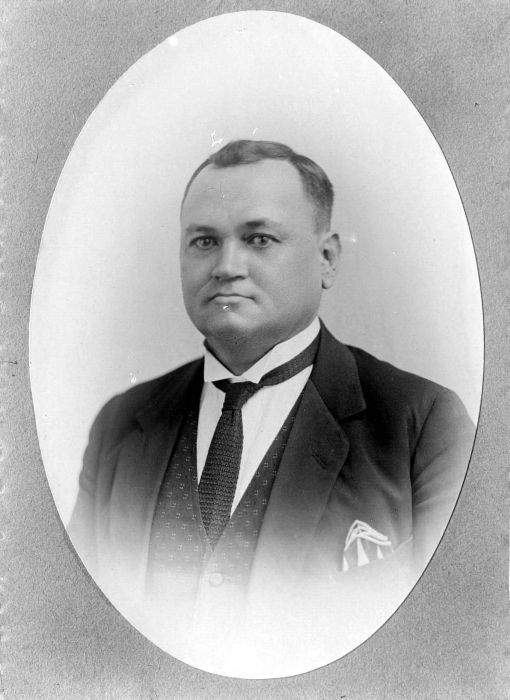
Dick de Hoog, president of the I.E.V. and member of the Volksraad.

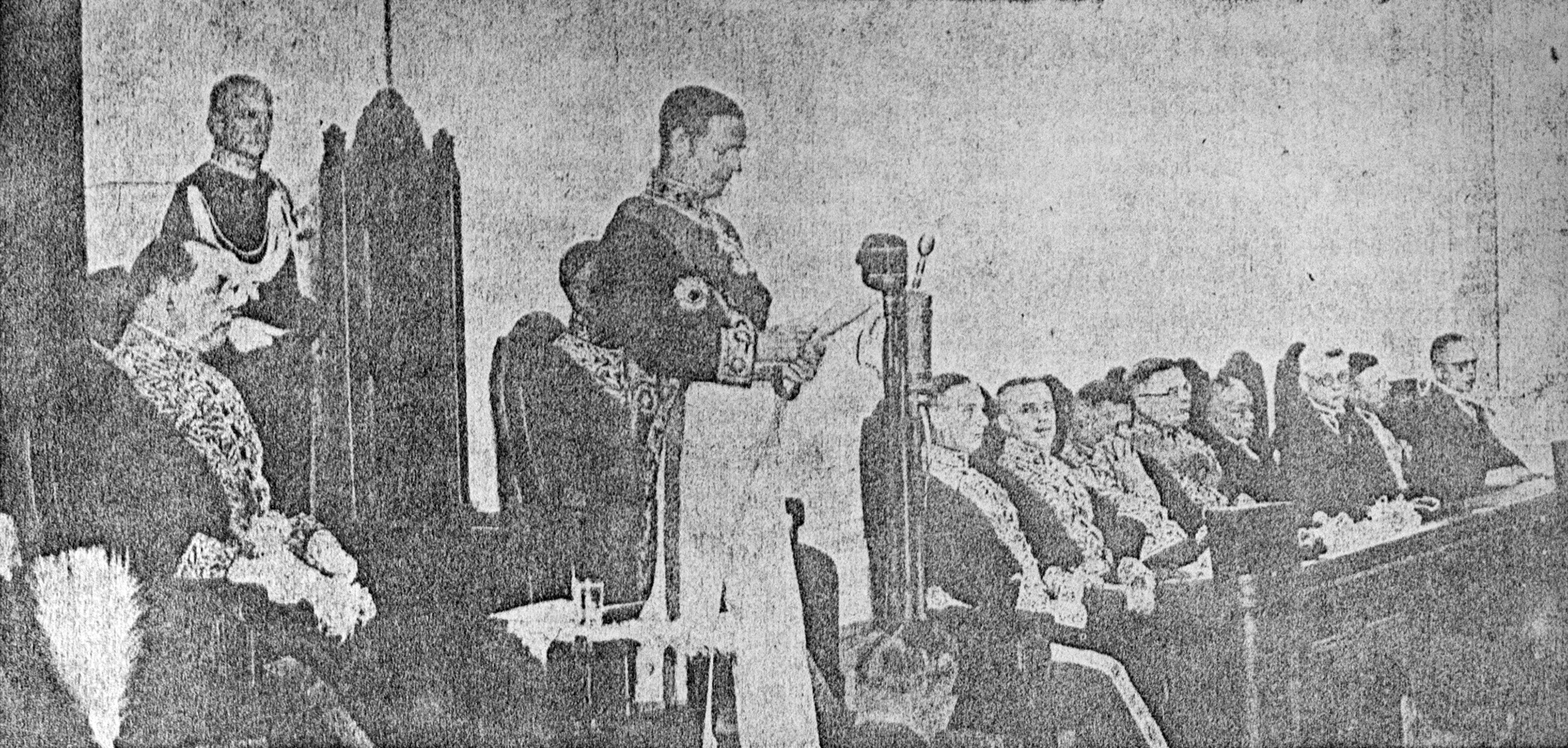
Volksraad opening session in July 1941, five months before the Japanese invasion of the Dutch East Indies
