= Khouw Tjoen =

Chinese-Indonesian businessman

- Born: Fujian, Qing Empire
- Died: 1831; Batavia, Dutch East Indies
- Occupations: Shipowner, businessman
- Years active: Late eighteenth
- Children: Khouw Tian Sek, Luitenant-titulair der Chinezen (son); Khouw Tian Ho (son); Khouw Tay Hien (son); Khouw Kang Nio (daughter)
- Father: Khouw Teng
- Relatives: Khouw Kek Po (grandfather); Khouw Shio (brother); Khouw Soen (brother); Khouw Tjeng Tjoan, Luitenant-titulair der Chinezen (grandson); Khouw Tjeng Kee, Luitenant-titulair der Chinezen (grandson); Khouw Tjeng Po, Luitenant-titulair der Chinezen (grandson); Khouw Kim An, Majoor der Chinezen (great-grandson); O. G. Khouw (great-grandson); Khouw Yauw Kie, Kapitein der Chinezen (great-grandson)

Khouw Tjoen (died in 1831), styled Khouw Tjoen Ko, was a prominent, late eighteenth-century Chinese-Indonesian ship owner and businessman, best-known now as the founder of the Khouw family of Tamboen, one of the most prominent dynasties of the 'Tjabang Atas' or Chinese gentry of colonial Indonesia.

Born in the mid-eighteenth century in Fujian, Qing Empire, Khouw Tjoen was the son of Khouw Teng, and a grandson of Khouw Kek Po, who hailed from the landowning Chinese scholar-gentry. Around 1769, Khouw Tjoen left China for Java in the Dutch East Indies (now Indonesia) with two of his brothers, Khouw Shio and Khouw Soen. The brothers settled down in Tegal, Central Java, where they engaged and prospered in business, including in shipowning and pawnbroking.

After a time, Khouw Tjoen relocated to Batavia (present-day Jakarta), capital of the Indies, where he established himself and his family. By a woman of Peranakan background, he had two sons, Khouw Tian Sek and Khouw Tian Ho, one daughter Khouw Kang Nio, and adopted his brother Khouw Shio's son Khouw Tay Hien.

Khouw died in 1831 in Batavia. His eldest son, Khouw Tian Sek, succeeded him as head of the family, and was awarded the prestigious honorary title of Luitenant-titulair der Chinezen. The substantive version of this title came with executive and judicial authority over the Dutch government's Chinese subjects in the Indies and was part of the Dutch colonial system of 'indirect rule'. While his eldest son's title was honorary, and thus came with no administrative responsibility, it marked the elevation of his family to the ranks of the Tjabang Atas.
