= Khouw (surname) =

Khouw (Pe̍h-ōe-jī: Khó) is a Dutch-based romanization of the Hokkien surname Xǔ (許) in West Java, Indonesia. In Central and East Java, Kho is a more common romanization.

Several (unrelated) families of this surname include:

- The Khouw family of Tamboen, part of the Cabang Atas or the traditional Chinese establishment of colonial Indonesia:
  - Luitenant Khouw Tian Sek, a landlord in the Dutch East Indies and patriarch of the Khouw family of Tamboen
  - Luitenant Khouw Tjeng Kee, a landlord
  - Luitenant Khouw Tjeng Tjoan, a landlord
  - Luitenant Khouw Tjeng Po, a landlord
  - Oen Giok Khouw, a prominent philanthropist and landowner in the Dutch East Indies
  - Kapitein Khouw Yauw Kie, a bureaucrat and landlord in the Dutch East Indies
  - Majoor Khouw Kim An, a high-ranking Chinese Indonesian bureaucrat, public figure and landlord in the Dutch East Indies
- The Chinese-Indonesian millionaire Khouw Kim Goan's family of the late colonial era:
  - Khouw Keng Nio, pioneering aviator and businesswoman
  - Khouw Khe Hien, pioneering aviator and businessman
