= Khouw Tian Sek =

Chinese Indonesian landlord in colonial Batavia

Luitenant Khouw Tian Sek
- Born: Batavia, Dutch East Indies
- Died: 1843; Batavia, Dutch East Indies
- Occupations: Luitenant der Chinezen, community leader, tycoon, landowner
- Years active: late eighteenth - early nineteenth century
- Children: Khouw Tjeng Tjoan, Luitenant der Chinezen; Khouw Tjeng Kee, Luitenant der Chinezen; Khouw Tjeng Po, Luitenant der Chinezen
- Father: Khouw Tjoen
- Relatives: Khouw Yauw Kie, Kapitein der Chinezen (grandson); Khouw Kim An, Majoor der Chinezen (grandson); Khouw Kim Tjiang, Kapitein der Chinezen (grandson); O. G. Khouw (grandson); Khouw Oen Hoei, Kapitein der Chinezen (grandson)

Khouw Tian Sek, Luitenant der Chinezen (died on November 17, 1843), popularly known as Teng Seck, was a Chinese Indonesian landlord in colonial Batavia (now Jakarta, capital of Indonesia). He is best known today as the patriarch of the prominent Khouw family of Tamboen.

He was born in Batavia in the late eighteenth century. His father, Khouw Tjoen, was a successful, Chinese-born merchant, who had migrated around 1769 from Fujian to Tegal on Java's north coast, thence to Batavia. Khouw Tian Sek succeeded his father in the family business upon the latter's death. He significantly reinvested the family fortune away from moneylending and pawnbroking to landownership, which was seen as more respectable.

Among his acquisitions was a great deal of land along the Molenvliet canal, a semi-rural area immediately south of old Batavia, which became the city's most prestigious business district in the mid-nineteenth century. As Arnold Wright points out, '[t]his [area] subsequently increased so enormously in value that without further effort on...[Khouw's] part he was changed from a comparatively well-to-do into an exceedingly wealthy man.' Khouw and his family commissioned three extravagant compounds along the fashionable Molenvliet (now Jalan Gajah Mada and Jalan Hayam Wuruk), of which only one, Candra Naya, has survived today.

Outside Batavia, Khouw became an important landheer through his acquisition of many particuliere landerijen or landed estates – including, in 1841, the family's largest and most important estate: Tamboen. Here, they would build their palatial country seat, landhuis Tamboen (now id:Gedung Juang Tambun). Rice, indigo, sugar, coconut, rubber and peanut were all cultivated at Tamboen and the family's other landholdings.

In old age, Khouw became the first member of his family to be elevated by the Dutch colonial government to the dignity of Luitenant der Chinezen. His lieutenancy, however, was honorary and entailed none of the usual political and legal jurisdiction over the local Chinese community. Khouw died in 1843.

His family became one of the principal dynasties of the Cabang Atas or the Chinese culinary gentry of colonial Indonesia. All three of his sons, Khouw Tjeng Tjoan, Khouw Tjeng Kee and Khouw Tjeng Po, were later also given honorary lieutenancies by the colonial authorities. In contrast, many of Khouw's grandsons would later serve as substantive Chinese officers as part of the colonial bureaucracy. Khouw Yauw Kie (son of Luitenant Khouw Tjeng Po) became the first member of the family to be appointed to the higher rank of Kapitein der Chinezen with a seat on the Chinese Council of Batavia. Another grandson, Khouw Kim An (son of Luitenant Khouw Tjeng Tjoan), was appointed to the highest rank in the Chinese administration, that of Majoor der Chinezen and ex officio chair of the Chinese Council of Batavia. Other prominent grandsons included the philanthropist O. G. Khouw (son of Luitenant Khouw Tjeng Kee); the bureaucrat Khouw Kim Tjiang, Kapitein der Chinezen of Buitenzorg (son of Luitenant Khouw Tjeng Tjoan, brother of Majoor Khouw Kim An); and the planter and landowner Khouw Oen Hoei, Kapitein der Chinezen (son of Luitenant Khouw Tjeng Kee, brother of O. G. Khouw).

To this day, an area in Asemka, Pinangsia, Jakarta is called Kebon Tengsek in his memory.
