= Khouw Yauw Kie =

Chinese-Indonesian bureaucrat

Kapitein Khouw Yauw Kie
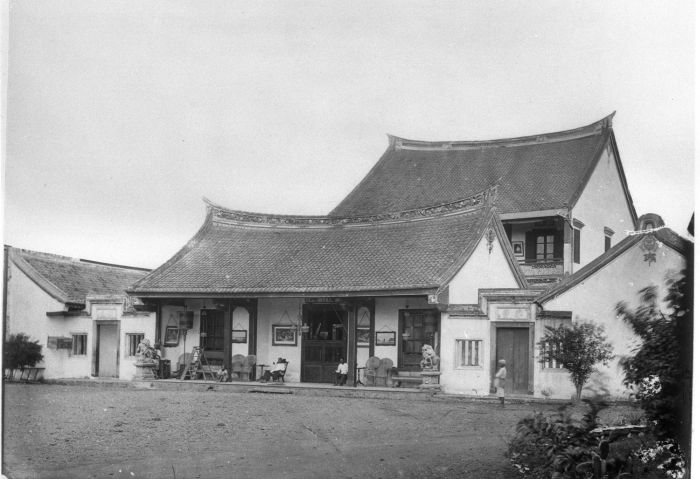
- Kapitein Khouw Yauw Kie and his younger cousin, the future Majoor Khouw Kim An at Candra Naya
- Born: 1860; Batavia, Dutch East Indies
- Died: 1908; Batavia, Dutch East Indies
- Occupations: Kapitein der Chinezen, bureaucrat, landlord
- Years active: Late nineteenth century
- Spouse: Tan Him Nio
- Children: Khouw Tjoei Nio
- Father: Luitenant Khouw Tjeng Po
- Relatives: Tan Tiang Po, Luitenant der Chinezen (father-in-law); Tan Liok Tiauw Sia (brother-in-law); Khouw Tjeng Tjoan, Luitenant der Chinezen (uncle); Khouw Tjeng Kee, Luitenant der Chinezen (uncle); Khouw Kim An, 5th Majoor der Chinezen (cousin); O. G. Khouw (cousin); Khouw Oen Hoei, Kapitein der Chinezen(cousin)

Khouw Yauw Kie, Kapitein der Chinezen (1860–1908), also spelled Khouw Jaouw Kie, Yaouw Kee, was a high-ranking Chinese-Indonesian bureaucrat. He was the first scion of the influential Khouw family of Tamboen to serve on the Chinese Council of Batavia.

== Life ==
Born in 1860 in Batavia, capital of the Dutch East Indies, Khouw was the second son of Khouw Tjeng Po, Luitenant-titulair der Chinezen (died 1883), and the grandson of the tycoon Khouw Tian Sek, Luitenant-titulair der Chinezen (died 1843). He was also a nephew of the landlords Luitenant Khouw Tjeng Tjoan and Luitenant Khouw Tjeng Kee. His father, uncles and grandfather held the honorary rank of Luitenant-titulair der Chinezen, proper to Chinese officials in the civil bureaucracy of colonial Indonesia, but without any of the substantive responsibilities. Khouw held the colonial hereditary title of Sia.

Khouw's family was one of the wealthiest dynasties of the Cabang Atas, or the Chinese gentry (baba bangsawan), of colonial Indonesia.

In 1883, at the age of 23, Khouw was appointed by the colonial government as a substantive Luitenant der Chinezen with a seat on the Chinese Council of Batavia. He, thus, became the first member of his family to serve as a substantive Chinese officer and to sit on the Chinese Council. In 1887, he also became the first in his family to be further elevated to the higher rank of Kapitein der Chinezen. Khouw served in office during the tenure of Majoor Lie Tjoe Hong, the third mayoral head of the Chinese community of Batavia.

Khouw was married to Tan Him Nio, daughter of Tan Tiang Po, Luitenant der Chinezen, and sister of the landlord and plantation owner Tan Liok Tiauw. The couple's only child and daughter, Khouw Tjoei Nio (born in 1896), would later marry the community leader and businessman Gouw Hie Kie, grandson of Kapitein der Chinezen Gouw Keng Loen (died in 1890).

== Foreign encounters ==
As one of the most significant figures of late nineteenth-century Batavia, Khouw was noted by a number of foreign visitors to the East Indies. The English aviation pioneer, Baden Fletcher Smyth Baden-Powell, brother of Lord Baden-Powell, was a guest at the Kapitein's residence while on a visit to Java in the late 1880s.

Baden-Powell wrote: "[T]he Captain of the Chinese is a great man. He has a large abode with a big courtyard in front, like a Chinese edition of Devonshire House." The aviation pioneer further commented on the Kapitein's private dinner party: "We went expecting to dine off bird's-nest soup, roast dog, and such-like heavenly delicacies, but were, in a way, really disappointed to find that our kind host had hired in for the occasion the best French cook to be found in Batavia, and he gave us an excellent little dinner. The other guests, to the number of about a dozen, were mostly Dutch officials." Baden-Powell also had the opportunity to meet the Kapitein's wife, "looking very glum, in a dress rather suggestive of nocturnal attire, but resplendent with diamonds...."

Another English writer, Arnold Wright, refers in his Twentieth Century Impressions of Netherlands India to Khouw's Chinese Captaincy and membership in the Chinese Council, and to his family's influence in Batavia.

== Death and legacy ==
Khouw died in 1908. Today, he is best remembered as one of the former owners of Candra Naya, a historic landmark in the Old Town of Jakarta. He was eventually succeeded on the Chinese Council in 1905 by his first cousin, Khouw Kim An, who went on to serve from 1910 as the last Majoor der Chinezen and ex officio Chair of the Chinese Council of Batavia, until his death in 1945.
