= Khouw Tjeng Po =

Luitenant Khouw Tjeng Po
- Born: 1838; Batavia, Dutch East Indies
- Died: 1882 (aged 43–44); Batavia, Dutch East Indies
- Occupations: Luitenant der Chinezen, community leader, tycoon, landowner
- Years active: mid-nineteenth - late nineteenth century
- Spouse: Gouw Hok Nio
- Children: Khouw Yauw Kie, Kapitein der Chinezen (son); Khouw Yauw Hoen (son)
- Father: Luitenant Khouw Tian Sek
- Relatives: Khouw Tjeng Tjoan, Luitenant der Chinezen (brother); Khouw Tjeng Kee, Luitenant der Chinezen (brother); Khouw Kim An, 5th Majoor der Chinezen (nephew); Khouw Oen Hoey, Kapitein der Chinezen (nephew); O. G. Khouw (nephew)

Khouw Tjeng Po, Luitenant-titulair der Chinezen (born in 1838 — died in 1882) was a Chinese magnate and landlord in Batavia, the capital of the Dutch East Indies (now Indonesia).

Khouw was the youngest son of Khouw Tian Sek, Luitenant-titulair der Chinezen (who died in 1843), a Batavia magnate and patriarch of the Khouw family of Tamboen. He was part of the Cabang Atas or the Chinese gentry (baba bangsawan) of colonial Indonesia. He had two elder brothers, Luitenant Khouw Tjeng Tjoan and Luitenant Khouw Tjeng Kee, and two sisters, Khouw Giok Nio and Khouw Kepeng Nio. Khouw, his father and brothers held the rank of Luitenant der Chinezen, awarded to high-ranking Chinese officials of the civil bureaucracy in the Dutch East Indies. The title had been granted on an honorary basis without administrative responsibilities.

Prior to his Chinese lieutenancy, he had the hereditary title of Sia as the son of a Chinese officer. From the mid-nineteenth century until the end of colonial rule, the family was acknowledged as the wealthiest Chinese-Indonesian family in Batavia.

The Luitenant died in 1882. He was married to Gouw Hok Nio. His son, Khouw Yauw Kie, became the first member of their family to serve on the Chinese Council of Batavia; first in 1883 as Luitenant, then in 1887 as a Kapitein der Chinezen. According to Arnold Wright, a younger son - Khouw Oen Hoen - was the head of the family at the start of the twentieth century.
