= Khouw family of Tamboen =

- Current region: Jakarta, Bekasi
- Origin: Fujian, Qing Empire
- Founded: 1769 (arrival in Java)
- Founder: Khouw Tjoen; Khouw Shio; Khouw Soen
- Titles: Majoor, Kapitein and Luitenant der Chinezen; Sia
- Members: Khouw Tian Sek, Luitenant-titulair der Chinezen; Khouw Tjeng Tjoan, Luitenant-titulair der Chinezen; O. G. Khouw; Khouw Kim An, 5th Majoor der Chinezen
- Connected families: The Oey family of Kemiri; The Lie family of Pasilian; The Kan-Han family
- Estates: Candra Naya; Gedung Juang Tambun; Mausoleum O. G. Khouw

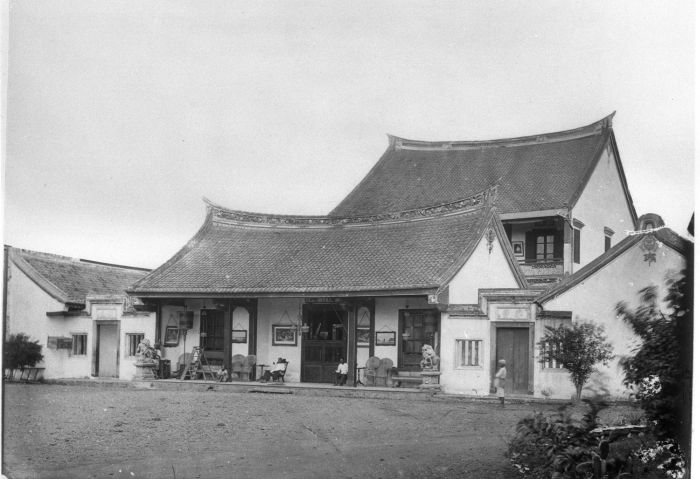
Kapitein Khouw Yauw Kie and Majoor Khouw Kim An at Candra Naya in 1864–5.

The Khouw family of Tamboen was an aristocratic landowning dynasty of bureaucrats and community leaders, part of the Cabang Atas or the Peranakan Chinese gentry of colonial Indonesia.

Many members of the family held the rank of Majoor, Kapitein and Luitenant der Chinezen in the colonial government, which gave them significant political and judicial jurisdiction over the colony's Chinese subjects. As among the colony's largest landlords, the family also played an important role in the urban, agricultural and economic development of the greater Jakarta area.

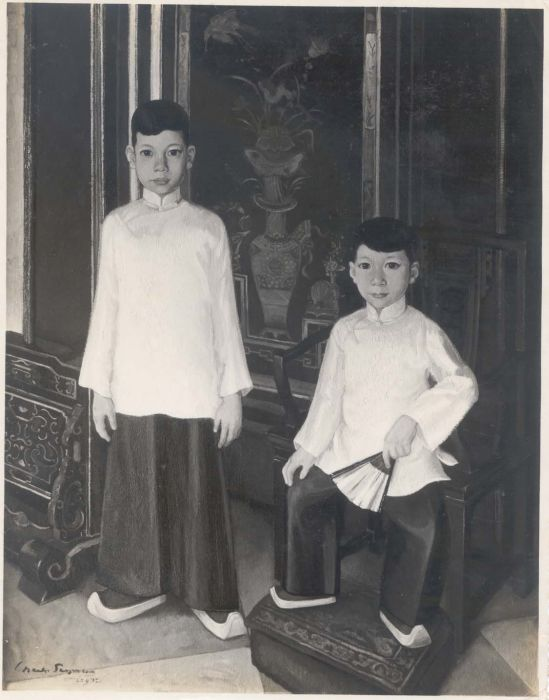
Portrait of Majoor Khouw Kim An's grandsons, Yan and Coen (by Charles Sayers, circa 1937).

The family traces its lineage back to the Chinese-born or Totok brothers Khouw Tjoen (died in 1831), Khouw Shio and Khouw Soen, who migrated around 1769 from their native Fujian in the Qing Empire to Tegal on Java's north coast, where they prospered in business. The brothers were the sons of Khouw Teng and grandsons of Khouw Kek Po, and hailed from the ranks of the landowning Chinese scholar-gentry.

The oldest, Khouw Tjoen, subsequently established himself in Batavia, capital of the Dutch East Indies, and accumulated land in the city and the surrounding countryside. On his death, Khouw Tjoen was succeeded by his eldest son, Khouw Tian Sek (died in 1843), who later became the first member of the family to be raised to the honorary, but not substantive, rank of Luitenant-titulair der Chinezen.

In his Twentieth Century Impressions, the British journalist Arnold Wright attributes the family's rise 'from...comparatively well-to-do into...exceedingly wealthy' to Luitenant Khouw Tian Sek, whose landholdings in then semi-rural Molenvliet suddenly became prime urban property as the colonial capital expanded southwards in the early nineteenth century. The family owned three extravagant Chinese compounds in Molenvliet, of which the only surviving one, Candra Naya, is now a major historic landmark in Jakarta. Khouw also began the family's century-long association with the particuliere land or private domain of Tamboen, the most important of the many estates the family acquired around Batavia. The family is also remembered today for their Art Deco country house, Landhuis Tamboen (now Gedung Juang Tambun).

Khouw's three sons, Khouw Tjeng Tjoan, Khouw Tjeng Kee and Khouw Tjeng Po, were − like their father − also elevated to the honorary rank of Luitenant-titulair der Chinezen. By the second half of the nineteenth century, the family's accumulation of dynastic land and wealth was among the largest and most significant in Batavia, if not the whole colony.

The three brothers had many wives and children. A number of their children were pre-eminent community leaders in the late colonial era, including: Khouw Yauw Kie (died 1908), the family's first Kapitein der Chinezen and first representative on the Kong Koan [the Chinese Council]; his cousin, Khouw Kim An, the last Majoor der Chinezen of Batavia (1875 - 1945); his brother, Khouw Kim Tjiang, Kapitein der Chinezen of Buitenzorg (now Bogor); and their cousin, the philanthropist O. G. Khouw (1874 - 1927).
