= Khouw Tjeng Tjoan =

Indonesian landlord (1808–1880)

Luitenant Khouw Tjeng Tjoan
- Born: 1808; Batavia, Dutch East Indies
- Died: 1880 (aged 71–72); Batavia, Dutch East Indies
- Occupations: Luitenant der Chinezen, community leader, tycoon, landowner
- Spouse: Lie Sek Nio (1832–1896)
- Children: Khouw Kim Po, Luitenant der Chinezen (son); Khouw Kim Tjiang, Kapitein der Chinezen (son); Khouw Kim An, Majoor der Chinezen (son)
- Father: Luitenant Khouw Tian Sek
- Relatives: Khouw Tjeng Kee, Luitenant der Chinezen (brother); Khouw Tjeng Po, Luitenant der Chinezen (brother); Khouw Yauw Kie, Kapitein der Chinezen (nephew); O. G. Khouw (nephew); Khouw Oen Hoei, Kapitein der Chinezen (nephew)

Khouw Tjeng Tjoan, Luitenant-titulair der Chinezen (Chinese: 許淸泉; pinyin: Xǔ Qīngquán; Pe̍h-ōe-jī: Khó͘ Chheng-chôaⁿ; 1808 – 1880) was a Chinese-Indonesian magnate and landlord.

== Biography ==
Tjoan was born in 1808, in Batavia, Dutch East Indies, into the Khouw family of Tamboen, part of the 'Cabang Atas' or Chinese gentry of colonial Indonesia. Khouw was the oldest of the three sons of the landlord Luitenant Khouw Tian Sek (died in 1843). From the mid-nineteenth century until his death, the younger Khouw and his brothers, Luitenant Khouw Tjeng Kee and Luitenant Khouw Tjeng Po, were widely acknowledged as the wealthiest Chinese in their native hometown of Batavia (now Jakarta, capital of Indonesia). Prior to his Chinese lieutenancy, he had the hereditary title of Sia as the son of a Chinese officer. He was raised in 1856, together with his brother Khouw Tjeng Kee, to the honorary rank of Luitenant-titulair der Chinezen, but without any of the entailed responsibilities in the civil administration.

Tjoan's was married to Lie Sek Nio (1832–1896), daughter and granddaughter of the landlords Lie Pek Tjiat and Kapitein-titulair der Chinezen Lie Tiang Ko, of the Lie family of Pasilian. Khouw's wife was also the sister of Luitenant der Chinezen Lie Tjoe Tjiang, and a first cousin of Lie Tjoe Hong, the 3rd Majoor der Chinezen of Batavia. Khouw lived with his wife, ten concubines and twenty-four children at Candra Naya, one of the three mansions on Molenvliet belonging to the Khouw family of Tamboen.

Tjoan died in 1880, aged 71 or 72, in Batavia. His funeral attracted – according to contemporary newspapers – thousands of onlookers who thronged the whole stretch of Molenvliet, all the way to Kebon Jeruk. Nonetheless, at least one writer commented that the late magnate was, in fact, unpopular among the general populace due to his "conceit, wrathfulness and twisted character".

Six of Tjoan's sons later served as Chinese officers in the colonial bureaucracy, most notably Khouw Kim An, the fifth and last Majoor der Chinezen of Batavia.
