= Khouw Tjeng Kee =

Luitenant Khouw Tjeng Kee
- Born: 1832; Batavia, Dutch East Indies
- Died: 1883 (aged 50–51); Batavia, Dutch East Indies
- Occupations: Luitenant der Chinezen, community leader, tycoon, landowner
- Years active: mid-nineteenth - late nineteenth century
- Spouse: Shie Hok Nio
- Children: Khouw Oen Djioe, Luitenant der Chinezen (son); Khouw Oen Tek, Luitenant der Chinezen (son); Khouw Oen Hoey, Kapitein der Chinezen (son); Oen Giok Khouw (son)
- Father: Luitenant Khouw Tian Sek
- Relatives: Khouw Tjeng Tjoan, Luitenant der Chinezen (brother); Khouw Tjeng Po, Luitenant der Chinezen (brother); Khouw Yauw Kie, Kapitein der Chinezen (nephew); Khouw Kim An, 5th Majoor der Chinezen (nephew)

Khouw Tjeng Kee, Luitenant-titulair der Chinezen (born in 1832 — died in 1883) was a Chinese-Indonesian magnate and landlord in Batavia, capital of the Dutch East Indies (now Indonesia).

Khouw was the second of three sons born to Khouw Tian Sek, Luitenant-titulair der Chinezen (died in 1843), a Batavia magnate and patriarch of the Khouw family of Tamboen, part of the Cabang Atas or the Chinese gentry (baba bangsawan) of colonial Indonesia. He had two brothers, Luitenant Khouw Tjeng Tjoan and Luitenant Khouw Tjeng Po, and two sisters, Khouw Giok Nio and Khouw Kepeng Nio. Khouw, his father and brothers held the rank of Luitenant der Chinezen, proper to high-ranking, Chinese officials of the civil bureaucracy in the Dutch East Indies. In their case, however, the title had been granted on an honorary basis without administrative responsibilities. Prior to his Chinese lieutenancy, he had the hereditary title of Sia as the son of a Chinese officer. Together with his eldest brother, Khouw Tjeng Tjoan, Khouw Tjeng Kee was elevated to the Chinese lieutenancy in 1856. From the mid-nineteenth century until the end of colonial rule, the family was acknowledged as the wealthiest Chinese-Indonesian family in Batavia.

Luitenant Khouw Tjeng Kee was administrateur of the family's extensive private domain (particuliere land) of Tamboen in Bekasi, east of Batavia.

The Luitenant was well-known for both his generous philanthropy and for his lavish parties, the last of which he hosted for Cap Go Meh (Chinese Lantern Festival) in 1883 with Lie Tjoe Hong, 3rd Majoor der Chinezen of Batavia. In contrast to his unpopular eldest brother Luitenant Khouw Tjeng Tjoan, the younger Khouw was lauded for his "generosity, helpfulness and humanity".

Three of Khouw's sons would later serve as substantive Chinese officers in the colonial bureaucracy. His eldest, Khouw Oen Djioe, was Luitenant der Chinezen of Parung from 1886 until 1895; Khouw Oen Tek was Luitenant in Buitenzorg from 1886 until 1889; and Khouw Oen Hoey was Luitenant in Batavia from 1899 until 1905. Another son, the philanthropist O. G. Khouw, achieved notoriety by becoming - together with Oey Tiang Hoei and Mas Asmioen - Indonesia's first Dutch citizen, thus bypassing the colony's racial segregation laws. His nephew, Khouw Kim An, served as the fifth and last Majoor der Chinezen of Batavia.
