= Jalan Gajah Mada and Jalan Hayam Wuruk =

Major thoroughfare in Jakarta, Indonesia

Gajah Mada Street, Hayam Wuruk Street
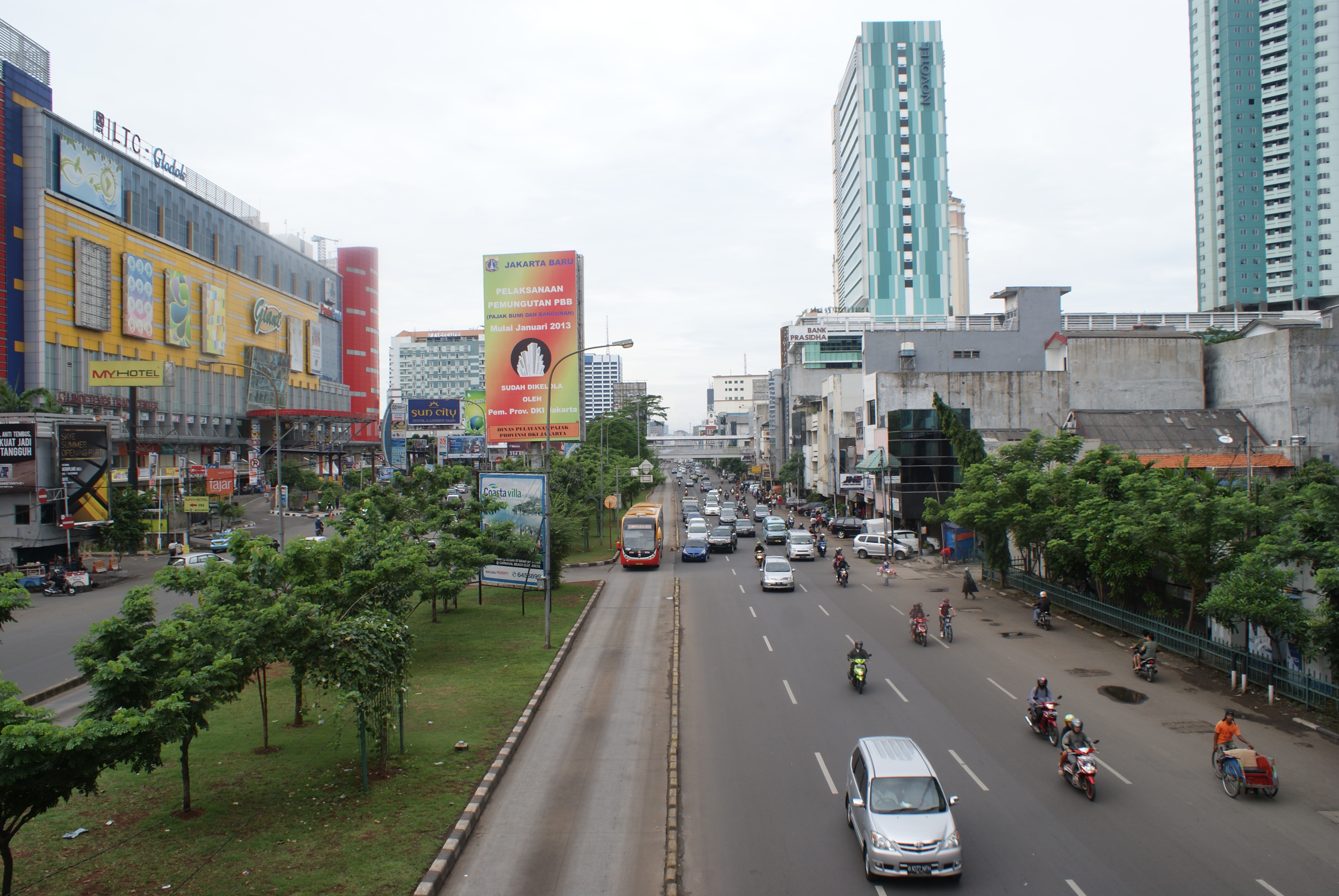
- The north end of Gajah Mada and Hayam Wuruk Street in 2013
- Native name: Jalan Gajah Mada (Indonesian); Jalan Hayam Wuruk (Indonesian)
- Former names: Molenvliet Oost, Molenvliet West
- Length: 2.84 km (1.76 mi)
- Location: Jakarta, Indonesia
- South end: Harmoni Junction
- Major junctions: Jl. KH. Hasyim Ashari, Jl. Batu Ceper, Jl. KH. Zinul Arifin-Jl. Sukarjo Wiryopranoto,
- North end: Jembatan Penghubung Glodok

Construction
- Completion: 1648

Jalan Gajah Mada and Jalan Hayam Wuruk (English: Gajah Mada and Hayam Wuruk Streets), formerly Molenvliet West and Molenvliet Oost respectively, is a major thoroughfare located in Jakarta, Indonesia. The two streets with its canal, the Batang Hari (formerly the Molenvliet), connect Glodok and Kota Tua Jakarta to the north along with Harmoni Junction to the south. Completed in late 1640s, the canal-street is Jakarta's oldest major thoroughfare.

== Description ==
At its northernmost point, Jalan Gajah Mada and Jalan Hayam Wuruk began at a junction where Jalan Pancoran, Jalan Pintu Besar Selatan, and Jalan Pinangsia Raya met (directly below the Glodok pedestrian link). The road ran toward the south parallel with the Batang Hari canal (official but not a very well-known name of the historic Molenvliet) until Harmoni Junction, a point where the roads stop. The Molenvliet however continued toward the east to reach Ciliwung. Jalan Gajah Mada and Jalan Hayam Wuruk is the oldest thoroughfare in Jakarta. The canal road traverses through the oldest China Town in Batavia. The road contains a mix of 18th-century Dutch colonial buildings, Chinese architecture, and newer modern buildings. Some of the oldest neighborhood of Batavia, e.g. Kebon Jeruk and Mangga Besar, was located along Jalan Gajah Mada and Jalan Hayam Wuruk.

The northern portion of the canal-road is within the administrative city of West Jakarta, while the southern portion is within Central Jakarta. The boundary of the two administrative cities is located at the junction of Jalan Sukarjo Wiryopranoto.

The first tramway of Jakarta (now defunct) pass through Molenvliet West (Jalan Gajah Mada), whilst the first corridor of TransJakarta bus rapid system pass through Jalan Gajah Mada and Jalan Hayam Wuruk. Jakarta MRT first line will pass below Jalan Gajah Mada and Jalan Hayam Wuruk toward Kota Tua.

== History ==
=== Early colonial period ===
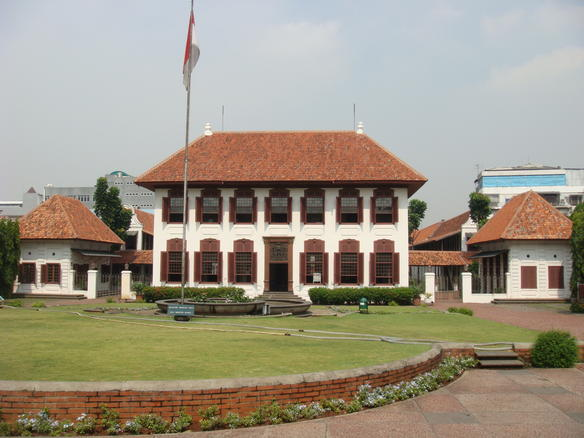
The residence of Reynier de Klerck, now the National Archives Building, is among the first Dutch mansion constructed along the Molenvliet

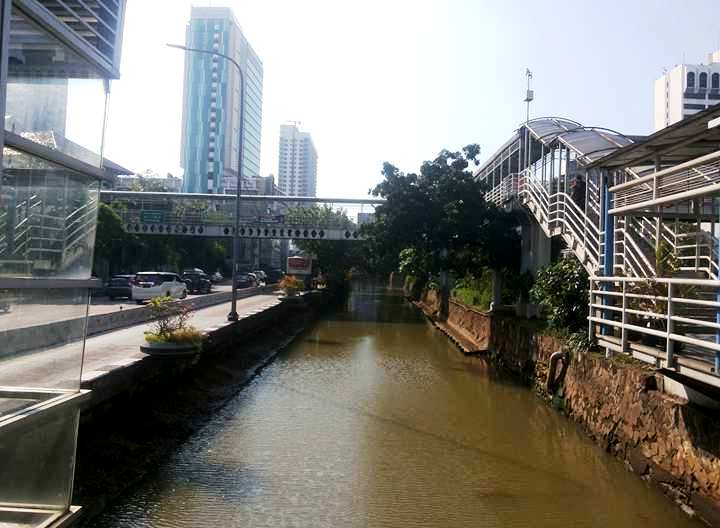
Flood canal passing between Jalan Gajah Mada and Jalan Hayam Wuruk.

Construction of canal-road Gajah Mada and Hayam Wuruk began in the 1648 when a channel was dug from the river Ciliwung toward the south to meet with the portion of Ciliwung at the south. The canal was built to drain water from the surrounding swamps south of Batavia as well as providing easier means of transporting goods. Construction was led by Phoa Beng Gan, Kapitein der Chinezen, the government-appointed Chinese headman of Batavia from 1645 to 1663. When the canal was completed, it was named Bingamvaart after Kapitan Beng Gan himself. In 1661, the canal was named Molenvliet, so called because of the existence of a number of mills (Dutch molen) near the canal. The point where the Molenvliet starts at north was the result of the extension of the Nieuwepoortstraat (now Jalan Pintu Besar Selatan). This new road, initially named Bingams gracht, became known as the Molenvliet West, the precursor of Jalan Gajah Mada. going toward south parallel with the Molenvliet was named Molenvliet West. The road Molenvliet West was largely complete c. 1650. The street extends far south until a point where Molenvliet makes a turn toward the east to feed on the southern portion of the Ciliwung.

In the 18th century, when the fortified city of Batavia became infested with malaria epidemics, people gradually began to move to the healthier southern hinterland starting with those who could afford to move. Rich people such as government officials or influential people began to build villas along Molenvliet West. Drawings from the second half of the 18th-century show many summer houses with elaborate gardens were built along the Molenvliet West, e.g. the grand residence of Reynier de Klerck which is now the old National Archives Building and Candra Naya, residence of Khouw Tian Sek, later Luitenant der Chinezen ('Lieutenant of the Chinese'). In the early 18th century, the street Prinselaan (now Jalan Mangga Besar Raya) was constructed from Ciliwung westward toward Molenvliet West, crossing the Molenvliet via a bridge. Around 1850, a new road was constructed toward the south from the point where the Prinselaan meets the canal. This new road, running along the eastern side of Molenvliet, was named Molenvliet Oost (now Jalan Hayam Wuruk). Unlike Molenvliet West, at this period the Molenvliet Oost had not go all the way toward the Nieuwpoortstraat nor toward the Noordwijk (now Jalan Ir. H. Juanda).

In the late eighteenth and the early nineteenth century, the Chinese-born merchant Khouw Tjoen and his son, Lieutenant Khouw Tian Sek, began to acquire a great deal of land along the Molenvliet, then still a semi-rural suburb of Batavia. Fortunately for the Lieutenant, the southwards urban expansion of Batavia in the early nineteenth century meant that '[t]his [area]...increased so enormously in value that without further effort on...[his] part he was changed from a comparatively well-to-do into an exceedingly wealthy man.' His descendants - the Khouw family of Tamboen, headed in the late colonial era by Khouw Kim An, last Majoor der Chinezen of Batavia - remained among the largest landowners in the Molenvliet area until the mid-twentieth century.

=== Modern colonial period ===
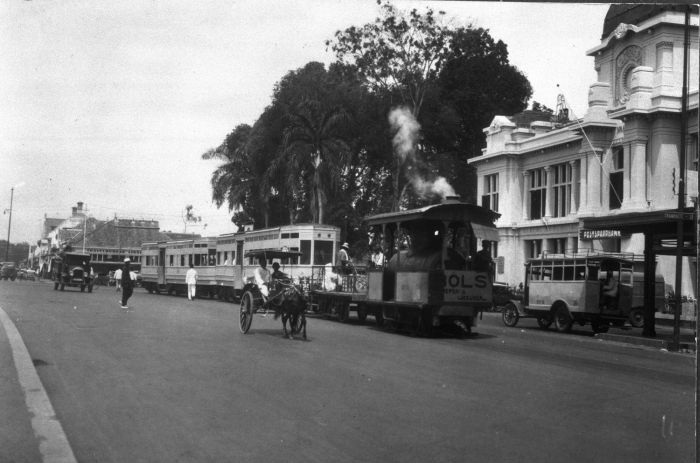
Jakarta Tram in Molenvliet West (now Jalan Gajah Mada). The building in the background is the old facade of the Postspaarbank, currently Bank Tabungan Negara office.

On April 20, 1869, the Batavia Tramway Company (Bataviasche Tramweg-Maatschappij) and the Firm Dummler & Co. started the horse-carried tram line number 1 in Molenvliet West, starting from Amsterdam Gate in Kota Tua to Harmonie. This line is the first and the main line of Jakarta tramline, which would be extended up until Meester Cornelis and would end in 1962.

At the beginning of the 20th century, the northern end of the Molenvliet retains its Old Town characteristic with its 18th-century China Town Glodok, while the newer southern portion of Molenvliet has a more European influence. Grand hotels and pleasure places were established at the south end of the canal-road e.g. Hotel des Indes, the Marine Hotel and the Harmony Society. In the early 1920s, the road Molenvliet Oost is extended north to finally reach the Nieuwpoortstraat (Jalan Pintu Besar Selatan) and converged with the Molenvliet West around Glodokplein. At the same period, the Molenvliet Oost was also extended south to Noordwijk (now Jalan Ir. H. Juanda).

=== Post-independence of Indonesia ===
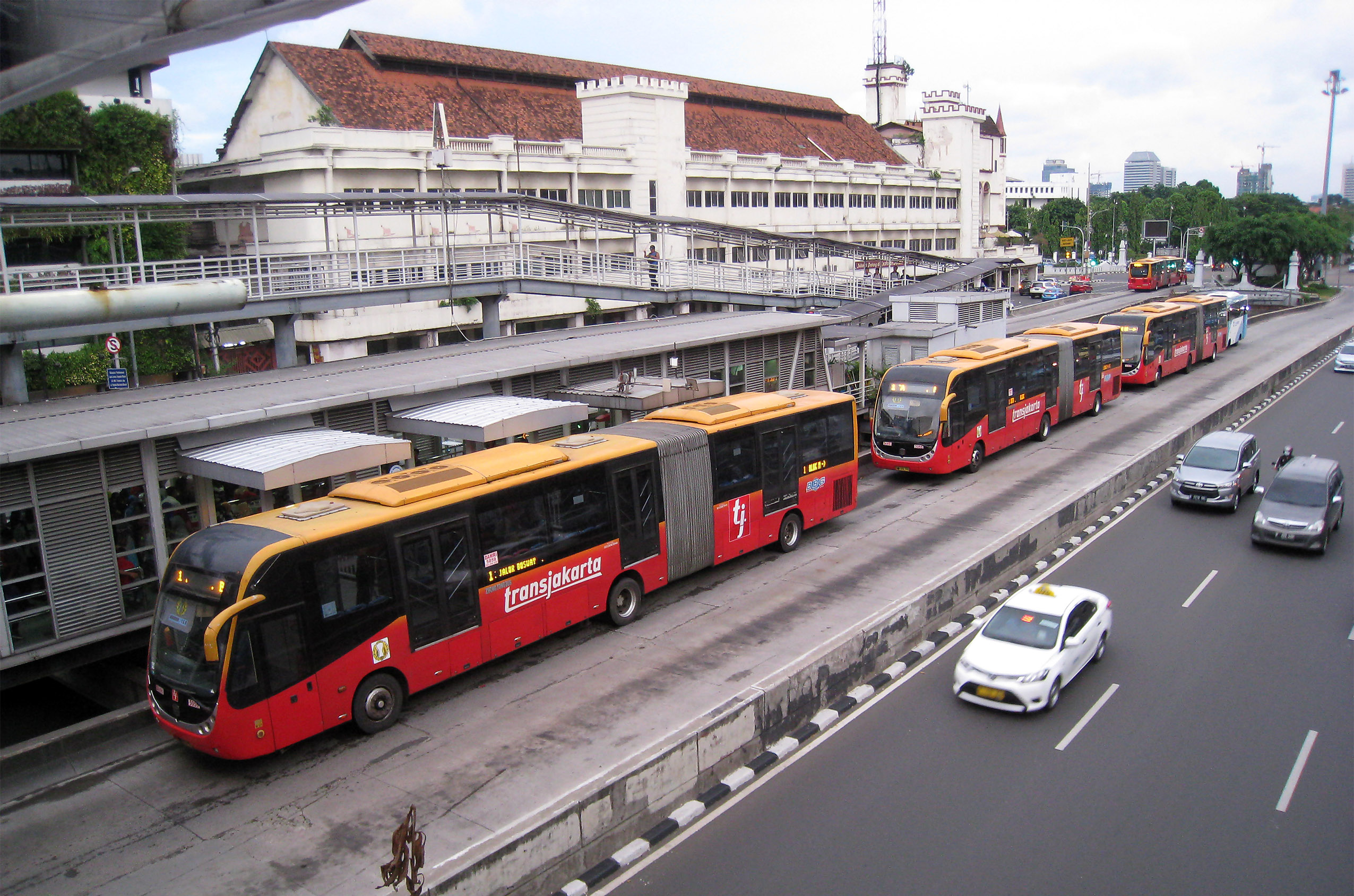
The southern end of Jalan Gajah Mada with the Harmoni Sentral Transjakarta stop, taken in 2016. Across the Molenvliet Canal is Jalan Hayam Wuruk. In the background is the building of the former Hotel des Galeries.

Following the nationalization of names in Indonesia, Molenvliet West became Jalan Gajah Mada, while Molenvliet Oost was renamed Jalan Hayam Wuruk. Both were named after Majapahit rulers.

Jalan Gajah Mada and Jalan Hayam Wuruk were the sites of many festivals, such as the anniversary of Jakarta or the Independence Declaration festivities. Chinese celebrations were held on a boat over the Molenvliet up until the 1970s.

In the 1980s, Jakarta experienced an economic boom period with the increase in private investment. Despite the boom in the economy, the environment of Jakarta became increasingly neglected. In the Molenvliet Canal, the water frequently sediments and garbage accumulate. With the shift of the financial economy toward Jalan Jenderal Sudirman, Kota was abandoned and businesses along Jalan Hayam Wuruk and Jalan Gajah Mada suffered.

In 2004, the first line of the Transjakarta busway, corridor 1, was inaugurated. The corridor passes through Jalan Gajah Mada and Jalan Hayam Wuruk. The structure for Transjakarta's Harmoni interchange is built over the Molenvliet obstructing the view of the canal.

== See also ==
- History of Jakarta

== Cited works ==
- Amanda Putri Nugrahanti (April 18, 2016). "Molenvliet dan Keindahan di Masa Lalu" [Molenvliet and the Beauty of the Past]. Harian Kompas (in Indonesian). Archived from the original on November 23, 2016.
- de Vletter, M.E.; Voskuil, R.P.G.A.; van Diessen, J.R. (May 1997). Batavia/Djakarta/Jakarta Beeld van een metamorfose. Purmerend: Asia Maior. ISBN 9074861091.
- Phoa Kian Sioe (2007). "Sejarahnya Phoa Beng Gan". In A.S., Marcus; Benedanto, P. (eds.). Kesastraan Melayu Tionghoa dan Kebangsaan Indonesia. Vol. Jilid 10. Jakarta: KPG (Kepustaan Populer Gramedia). ISBN 978-9799100795.
- Merrillees, Scott (2015). Jakarta: Portraits of a Capital 1950-1980. Jakarta: Equinox Publishing. ISBN 9786028397308.
- Merrillees, Scott (2000). Batavia in Nineteenth Century Photographs. Singapore: Editions Didier Millet. ISBN 9789813018778.
- Mulyawan Karim, ed. (2009). EKSPEDISI CILIWUNG, Laporan Jurnalistik Kompas, Mata Air - Air Mata. Jakarta: PT. Kompas Media Nusantara. ISBN 978-9797094256.
- Teeuwen, Dirk (2010). From horsepower to electrification Tramways in Batavia-Jakarta 1869-1962 (PDF). Archived from the original (PDF) on 2016-07-05.
