= Oen Giok Khouw =

Indonesian philanthropist

- Born: 1874; Batavia, Dutch East Indies
- Died: 1927 (aged 52–53); Bad Ragaz, Switzerland
- Occupations: Landowner, philanthropist
- Spouse: Lim Sha Nio
- Father: Luitenant der Chinezen Khouw Tjeng Kee
- Relatives: Khouw Tian Sek, Luitenant der Chinezen (grandfather); Khouw Oen Hoei, Kapitein der Chinezen (brother); Khouw Tjeng Tjoan, Luitenant-titulair der Chinezen (uncle); Khouw Kim An, Majoor der Chinezen (cousin)

Khouw Oen Giok Sia (1874 – 1927), later more popularly known as Oen Giok Khouw or O. G. Khouw, was a philanthropist and landowner in the Dutch East Indies (now Indonesia). He gained notoriety for acquiring Dutch citizenship, thus breaking down the race barriers of colonial society. Today, he is best remembered for his extravagant mausoleum in Petamburan, Jakarta.

== Family ==
Born in 1874 in Batavia (now Jakarta), he was a scion of the Khouw family of Tamboen, part of the Cabang Atas or the Chinese gentry (baba bangsawan) of colonial Indonesia. His father, Khouw Tjeng Kee, Luitenant-titulair der Chinezen (died in 1883), was a prominent landlord and community leader. Khouw's father and uncles, Luitenant Khouw Tjeng Tjoan and Luitenant Khouw Tjeng Po, were the sons of the late eighteenth-century magnate, Luitenant Khouw Tian Sek (died in 1843). The Chinese lieutenancies of Khouw's father, uncles and grandfather were honorary appointments without any of the entailed governmental authority.

As a descendant of Chinese officers, Khouw was born with the courtesy title of 'Sia'. His brothers, including Kapitein Khouw Oen Hoei, and many of his cousins, such as Kapitein Khouw Yauw Kie and most notably, Khouw Kim An, the fifth and last Majoor der Chinezen of Batavia, would later acquire substantive and ever higher appointments in the colonial administration. For almost two centuries, the family as a whole exerted a great deal of influence in colonial Indonesia through their extensive landownership and control of bureaucratic offices.

== Life ==
O. G. Khouw was part of the first generation of Indonesians to receive a thoroughly western upbringing and education. Although he grew up in Batavia, Khouw spent most of his later life in fin-de-siècle Europe, primarily between Switzerland and the South of France. He was married to Lim Sha Nio, but did not have any children.

Unlike many of his brothers and cousins, Khouw lived his life as a private citizen and eschewed official involvement in the colonial Chinese bureaucracy. He was one of the owners of a colonial banking corporation, Than Kie Bank, and - together with Tan Liok Tiauw and D. N. van Stralendorff - of Tendjo Ayoe, one of the largest tea and rubber plantations in Sukabumi.

Despite his lack of involvement in the colonial bureaucracy, Khouw was nonetheless well-known as a generous patron and benefactor of many charitable causes, both in Indonesia and Europe. In 1901, together with Phoa Keng Hek and other community leaders, he helped establish Tiong Hoa Hwee Koan, a Chinese educational and cultural organization, and served as its inaugural Vice-President. (His cousin, Majoor Khouw Kim An, would later marry Phoa Keng Hek's daughter.) Khouw was also head of the hospitaalfonds 'Jang Seng Ie', which later grew to become Husada Hospital. After the outbreak of World War I, Khouw – already living in Europe – donated f. 40,000 for the Dutch Red Cross in 1915.

Together with Mas Asmioen and Oey Tiang Hok, he shocked Dutch colonial society by becoming naturalized citizens of the Netherlands in 1908. In so doing, they bypassed the racial caste system of colonial Indonesia.

== Death and burial ==
He died in 1927 at the spa town of Bad Ragaz in Switzerland. His ashes were transferred from Europe to Indonesia on board the SS Prins der Nederlanden.

His last resting place, Mausoleum O. G. Khouw in Petamburan, is now a local landmark in Jakarta. It was constructed in the Art Deco style by G. Racina, an Italian contractor, at the then massive cost of f 500,000 (around US$250,000 at the time; or US$4.5 million in today's money). On its completion in 1932, the mausoleum's astronomical cost caused a sensation among the press of colonial Indonesia and the Netherlands. One commentator noted that Khouw's mausoleum was considerably more expensive than the burial memorial of American billionaire William Rockefeller in Sleepy Hollow, New York.
