= Landed =

Landed may refer to:

- Landed (album), a 1975 album by German krautrock band Can.
- "Landed (Ben Folds song)", from Songs for Silverman 2005
- "Landed", a song by Drake from Dark Lane Demo Tapes
- Landed gentry, a largely historical privileged British social class
- Landed property, a real estate term

== See also ==
- Landing (disambiguation)
- Landed gentry (disambiguation)
