= Khouw Kim An =

Indonesian politician

Majoor Khouw Kim An
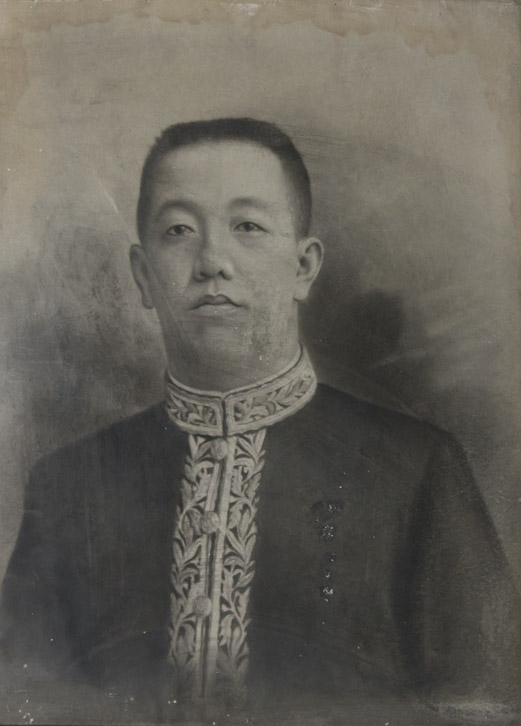
- Portrait, c. late 1910s (from Leiden University)

Majoor der Chinezen of Batavia
- In office 1927–1945
- Preceded by: Office in abeyance
- Succeeded by: Office abolished
- In office 1910–1918
- Preceded by: Tio Tek Ho
- Succeeded by: Office in abeyance

Personal details
- Born: 1875 Batavia, Dutch East Indies (present-day Indonesia)
- Died: 13 February 1945 (aged 69–70) Tjimahi, West Java, Dutch East Indies (present-day Indonesia)
- Spouse: Phoa Tji Nio
- Relations: Khouw Tian Sek, Luitenant der Chinezen (grandfather); Phoa Keng Hek Sia (father-in-law); Khouw Kim Tjiang, Kapitein der Chinezen (brother); O. G. Khouw (cousin)
- Children: Phoa Liong Djin
- Parent: Khouw Tjeng Tjoan (father)
- Occupation: Majoor der Chinezen, community leader, parliamentarian, landowner
- Awards: Great Gold Star for Loyalty and Merit; Officer of the Order of Orange-Nassau

Khouw Kim An, 5th Majoor der Chinezen (Chinese: 許金安; pinyin: Xǔ Jīn'ān; Pe̍h-ōe-jī: Khó͘ Kim-an; 1875 – 13 February 1945) was a high-ranking Chinese Indonesian bureaucrat, public figure and landlord who served as the fifth and last Majoor der Chinezen ("Major of the Chinese") of Batavia, Dutch East Indies (now Jakarta). The Chinese Mayoralty was the highest-ranking, Chinese government position in the East Indies with considerable political and judicial jurisdiction over the colony's Chinese subjects. The Batavian Mayoralty was one of the oldest public institutions in the Dutch colonial empire, perhaps second only in antiquity to the viceregal post of Governor-General of the Dutch East Indies.

== Family and background ==
Khouw Kim An Sia was born in Batavia in 1875 to the ninth concubine of his father, Khouw Tjeng Tjoan, Luitenant-titulair der Chinezen (died in 1880). Khouw's father and uncles, Luitenant Khouw Tjeng Kee and Luitenant Khouw Tjeng Po, were the sons of the late eighteenth-century magnate, Luitenant Khouw Tian Sek (died in 1843), patriarch of the Khouw family of Tamboen, arguably the richest dynasty in Batavia among the Cabang Atas aristocracy of colonial Java. The Chinese lieutenancies of Khouw's father, uncles and grandfather were honorary appointments without any of the entailed governmental authority. As the son and grandson of Chinese officieren ('Chinese officers'), Khouw Kim An was born with the hereditary title of Sia.

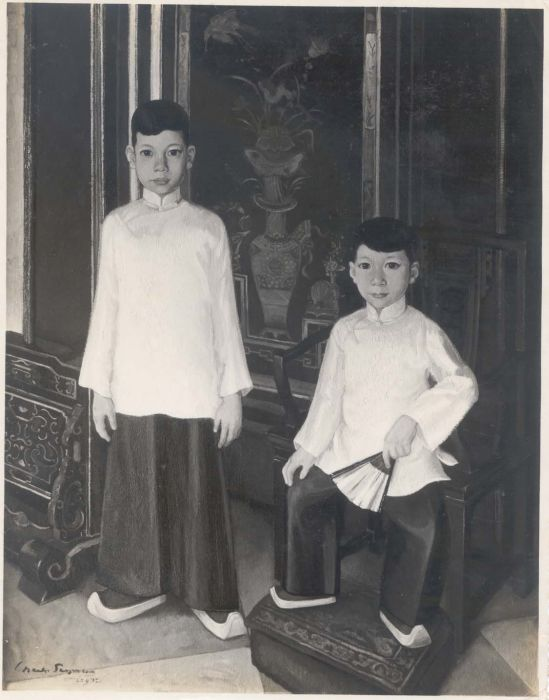
Portrait of Majoor Khouw Kim An's grandsons, Yan and Coen (by Charles Sayers, circa 1937).

Khouw Kim An Sia received a traditional Chinese education grounded in the Chinese Classics, and acquired a good grasp of both Mandarin and Hokkien in addition to his native Batavian Malay. He was also instructed by private tutors in European languages, including Dutch which he spoke fluently. The future Majoor's Chinese training, however, stands in sharp contrast to the Dutch education of many in his increasingly westernised social class and generation, most obviously exemplified by his cousin, the naturalised Dutchman and philanthropist O. G. Khouw. This familiarity with Chinese culture gave him a distinct, and by then rare, advantage in his career as the head and public face of the Chinese in the colony.

At the age of 18, Khouw married Phoa Tji Nio, the daughter and heiress of an influential community leader, Phoa Keng Hek Sia, founder of the influential educational and community organisation Tiong Hoa Hwee Koan. Khouw's wife was also the granddaughter of Phoa Tjeng Tjoan, Kapitein der Chinezen of Buitenzorg (now Bogor). The two families already had significant ties. Since 1886, Khouw's older brother, Khouw Kim Tjiang, had served as Luitenant der Chinezen of Buitenzorg, and would eventually succeed Khouw's grandfather-in-law as Kapitein. Khouw's cousin, O. G. Khouw, also served as Vice-President to Khouw's father-in-law, Phoa Keng Hek Sia, in the latter's capacity as the founding President of Tiong Hoa Hwe Koan. Khouw himself would later play an important role in his father-in-law's organisation.

The newly married couple lived in Buitenzorg, where both bride and groom already had significant family ties. The marriage produced four sons and two daughters. Khouw Kim An Sia and his family remained in Buitenzorg until they inherited Candra Naya, one of Batavia's grandest historic mansions, from Khouw's cousin, Khouw Yauw Kie, a Kapitein der Chinezen in the Chinese Council of Batavia (Dutch: Chinese Raad; Hokkien: Kong Koan).

== Chinese mayoralty ==
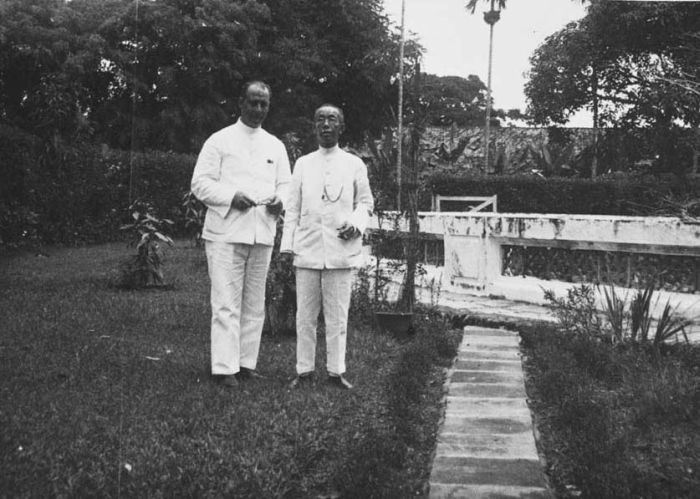
Majoor Khouw Kim An (right) with a European guest.

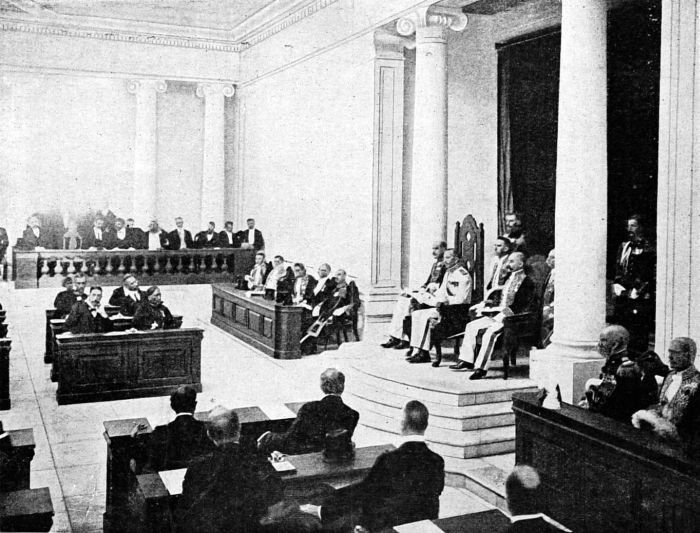
Opening of the Volksraad.

In 1905, Khouw was raised to the post of Luitenant der Chinezen with a seat on the Chinese Council of Batavia.

In 1907, Tio Tek Ho, 4th Majoor der Chinezen of Batavia resigned. The former Majoor was seen as a reactionary traditionalist; and many in the Dutch government and Batavia's Chinese community desired a change of direction in the governance of the Chinese community. Following extensive consultations with Khouw's influential father-in-law, Phoa Keng Hek, the Dutch government decided to appoint Khouw as eventual successor to Majoor Tio Tek Ho.

Tradition, however, demanded that only Kapiteins could be considered for elevation to the Mayoralty. Khouw, who was still a Luitenant, was quickly raised to the rank of Kapitein in 1908 before his final appointment in 1910 as the fifth and last Majoor der Chinezen of Batavia. His elevation, while seen as a progressive appointment, nonetheless took place thanks to the influence and family background of both the new Majoor and his wife. As Majoor and head of the Chinese community, Khouw also acted as the ex officio Chair of the Chinese Council of Batavia, and part of the Volksraad (or colonial legislative assembly) of the Dutch East Indies. He maintained close relations with other Chinese members of the Volksraad, such as Hok Hoei Kan and Loa Sek Hie.

In 1918, all Chinese officers, including Khouw, were relieved of their office as part of the government's review of the role of the Chinese officership in the colonial administration. Many community activists had criticised the system of governance by Chinese officers, or 'Indirect Rule', as an archaic relic of feudalism. Khouw, however, remained in the government's good books, and was appointed an Officer of the Order of Orange-Nassau in 1920. Finally, in 1927, Khouw − but not the other Chinese officers − was restored to the Chinese Mayoralty of Batavia, probably thanks to the antiquity and, therefore, the historic and symbolic value of the institution Khouw represented. By then, a lot of the political and legal powers of the Chinese Mayoralty had devolved upon the colonial civil service. Many of the duties of the last Majoor were, consequently, ceremonial in nature.

While on a visit to The Netherlands in 1927, he was received formally at Court by Queen Wilhelmina, and conveyed to the Sovereign the loyal greetings of the Chinese community of the Dutch East Indies. The Majoor celebrated his Silver Jubilee as Chinese Officier on February 10, 1930, on which occasion the Queen conferred upon him the Great Gold Star for Loyalty and Merit (Groote Gouden Ster voor Trouw en Verdienste) in recognition of his long service to the Crown. It was the highest grade, awarded only to the most eminent native chiefs, in what was seen as the colonial counterpart of the Order of the Netherlands Lion.

== Second World War and death ==
During the Second World War, the Japanese invaded and occupied the Dutch East Indies. In 1942, Majoor Khouw Kim An was apprehended by the Japanese and imprisoned with other leaders of the Dutch colonial government in Tjimahi. He died in prison on February 13, 1945.

His remains were buried near the famous mausoleum of his cousin, O. G. Khouw, in Petamburan.

== Bibliography ==
- Blussé, Leonard; Chen, Menghong (2003). The Archives of the Kong Koan of Batavia. Leiden: BRILL. ISBN 9004131574.
- Erkelens, Monique (2013). The decline of the Chinese Council of Batavia: the Loss of Prestige and Authority of the Traditional Elite amongst the Chinese Community from the End of the Nineteenth Century until 1942 (PDF). Leiden: Leiden University.
- Knapp, Ronald (2013). Chinese Houses of Southeast Asia: The Eclectic Architecture of Sojourners and Settlers. North Clarendon: Tuttle Publishing. ISBN 978-1462905874.
- Lohanda, Mona (1996). The Kapitan Cina of Batavia, 1837–1942: A History of Chinese Establishment in Colonial Society. Jakarta: Djambatan. ISBN 979428257X.
- Nio, Joe Lan (1940). Riwajat 40 Taon Dari Tiong Hoa Hwee Koan Batavia (1900–1939) [40 Years of Tiong Hoa Hwee Koan Batavia (1900–1939)] (in Indonesian). Batavia: Tiong Hoa Hwee Koan.
- Phoa, Kian Sioe (1956). Sedjarahnja : Souw Beng Kong, Phoa Beng Gan, Oey Tamba Sia [The Chronicles of Souw Beng Kong, Phoa Beng Gan, Oey Tamba Sia] (in Indonesian). Djakarta: Reporter.
- Suryadinate, Leo (2015). Prominent Indonesian Chinese: Biographical Sketches. Singapore: Institute of Southeast Asian Studies. ISBN 978-9813055032.
- Suryadinata, Leo (2005). Peranakan Chinese Politics in Java, 1917–1942. Marshall Cavendish Academic. ISBN 9812103600.
- Wright, Arnold (1909). Twentieth Century Impressions of Netherlands India: Its History, People, Commerce, Industries and Resources. Lloyd's Greater Britain Pub. Co.

Government offices
Preceded by Tio Tek Ho, Majoor der Chinezen	Majoor der Chinezen of Batavia; 1910–1918	Vacant Office in abeyance
Vacant Office in abeyance	and 1927–1945	Office abolished
