= Mandarin (bureaucrat) =

Historical term for bureaucrat scholars in China, Korea, and Vietnam

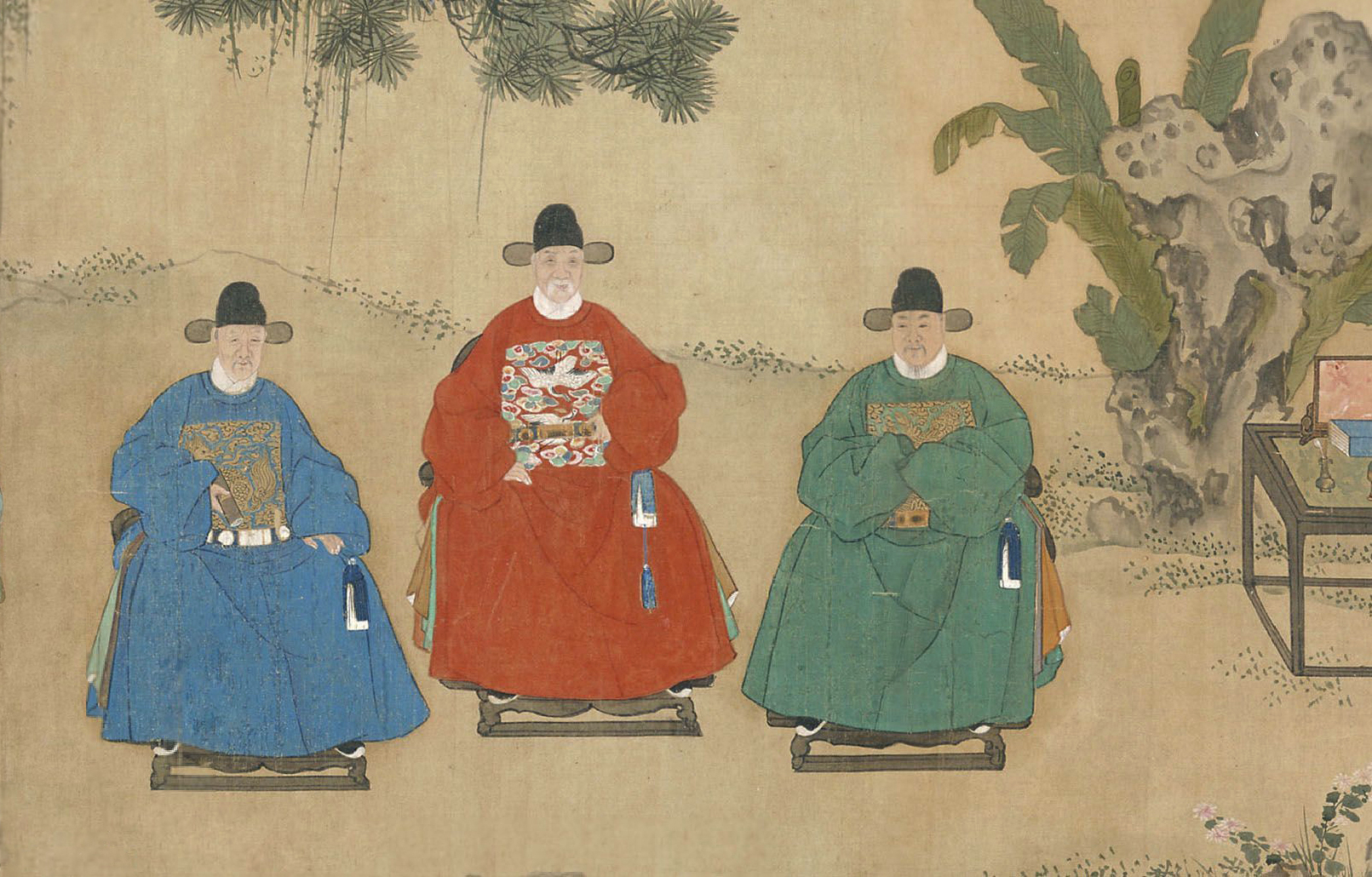
- Three Ming Dynasty mandarins of varying ranks.

Chinese name
- Chinese: 官
Transcriptions
Standard Mandarin
- Hanyu Pinyin: guān
- Bopomofo: ㄍㄨㄢ
- Wade–Giles: kuan^{1}
- IPA: [kwán]
Yue: Cantonese
- Yale Romanization: gūn
- Jyutping: gun1
- IPA: [kun˥]
Southern Min
- Hokkien POJ: koaⁿ / koan
- Tâi-lô: kuann / kuan

Vietnamese name
- Vietnamese alphabet: quan quan lại
- Chữ Hán: 官 官吏

Korean name
- Hangul: 관
- Hanja: 官
Transcriptions
- Revised Romanization: gwan
- McCune–Reischauer: kwan

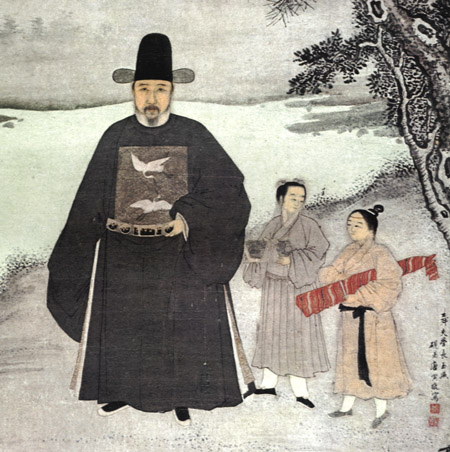
A 15th-century portrait of the Ming official Jiang Shunfu. The cranes on his mandarin square indicate that he was a civil official of the sixth rank.

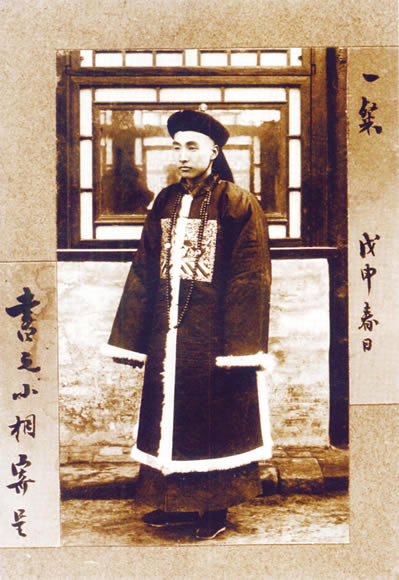
A Qing photograph of a government official with mandarin square embroidered in front

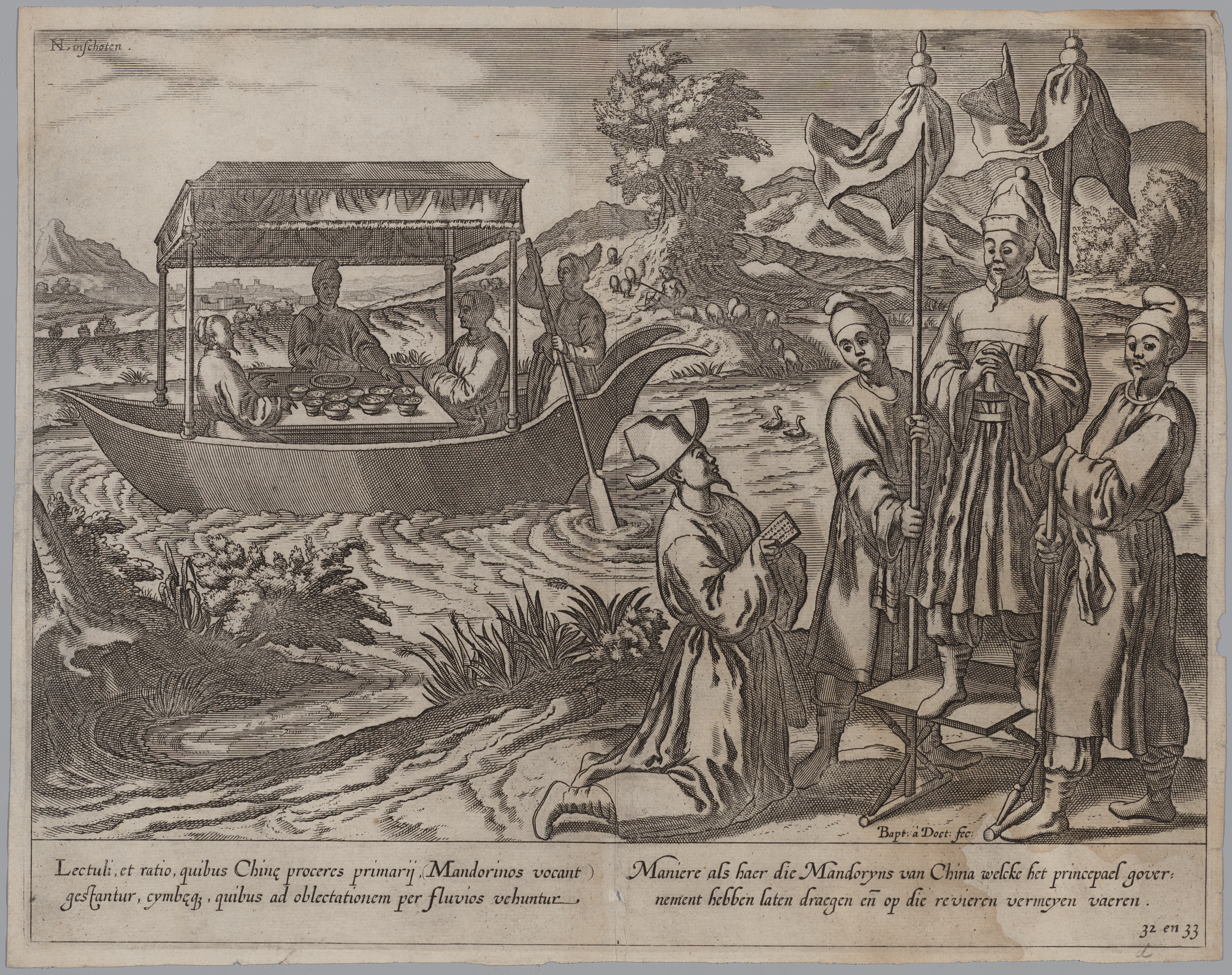
A European view: a mandarin travelling by boat, Baptista van Doetechum, 1604

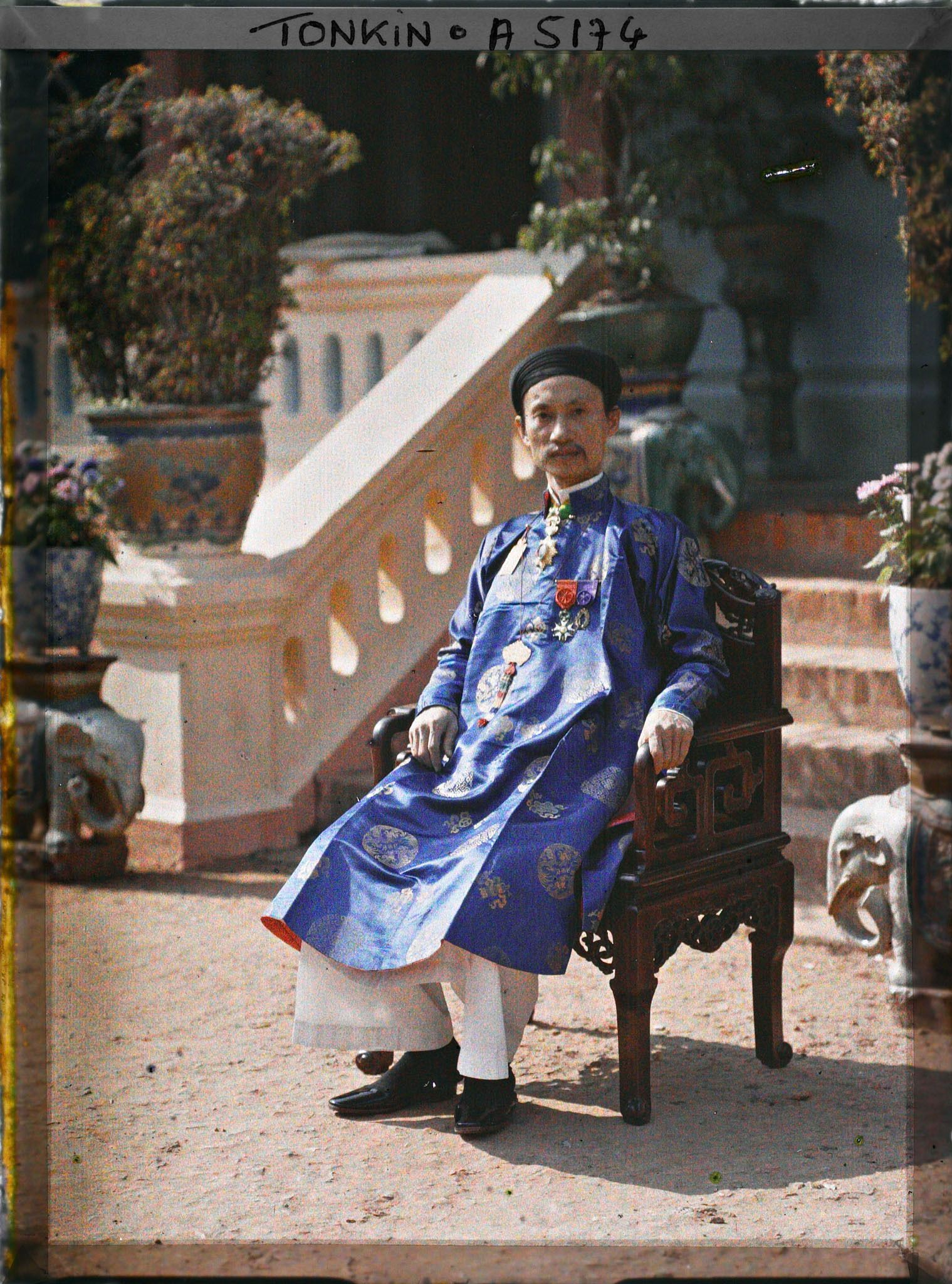
Hoàng Trọng Phu (1872–1946) was a mandarin of the Nguyễn dynasty in Vietnam.

A mandarin (Chinese: 官; pinyin: guān) was a scholar-bureaucrat in the historical governments of China, Korea, and Vietnam.

The term is generally applied to the officials appointed through the imperial examination system.

== History and use of the term ==
The English term comes from the Portuguese mandarim (pronounced [ˌmɐ̃dɐˈɾĩ], spelled in Old Portuguese as mandarin). The Portuguese word was used in one of the earliest Portuguese reports about China: letters from the imprisoned survivors of the Tomé Pires embassy, most likely written in 1524, and in Castanheda's História do descobrimento e conquista da Índia pelos portugueses (c. 1559). Matteo Ricci, who entered mainland China from Portuguese Macau in 1583, also said the Portuguese used the word.

The Portuguese word was thought by many to be related to mandador 'one who commands' and mandar 'to command', from Latin mando, mandare 'to command'. Modern dictionaries, however, agree that the Portuguese borrowed it from the Malay menteri (in Jawi: منتري, [ˈməntəri]), which is borrowed in turn from the Sanskrit mantrin (Devanagari: म॒न्त्रिन्, meaning counselor or minister), an agent noun formed from mantra (मन्त्र 'sacred text' or etymologically lit. 'instrument of thought') by suffixation with -in (-इन्). It therefore etymologically meant 'possessor of sacred knowledge'. The Sanskrit terms ultimately derive from the Proto-Indo-European root *men- 'to think', which also yielded the English words monitor and mentor by a similar suffixation process.

According to Malaysian scholar Ungku Abdul Aziz, the term had its origin when the Portuguese living in Malacca during the Malacca Sultanate traveled to meet with higher officials in China and referred to them with the familiar term from Malay menteri (in Jawi: منتري, [ˈməntəri]), but pronounced by the Portuguese with Old Portuguese phonology, pronounced [ˌmɐ̃dɐˈɾĩ], where the vowel ending was nasalized and later misinterpreted as having ended in -n, and initially spelt in Old Portuguese as mandarin, then in modern Portuguese as mandarim, due to the nasalized pronunciation in Portuguese.

In the 16th century, before the term mandarin became widespread in European languages, the word Loutea (with various spelling variations) was often used in Europeans' travel reports to refer to Chinese scholar-officials. It is frequently used, for example, in Galeote Pereira's account of his experiences in China in 1548–1553, which was published in Europe in 1565, or (as Louthia) in Gaspar da Cruz' Treatise of China (1569). C. R. Boxer says the word comes from Hokkien Chinese: 老爹; Pe̍h-ōe-jī: ló-tia; IPA: /lo˦ tia˦/, which was a common form of address for government officials in the Zhangzhou dialect of Hokkien Chinese. This is also the main term used to refer to the scholar-officials in Juan González de Mendoza's History of the Great and Mighty Kingdom of China and the Situation Thereof (1585), which heavily drew (directly or indirectly) on Pereira's report and Gaspar da Cruz' book, and which was the standard European reference on China in the late 16th century.

In the West, the term mandarin is associated with the concept of the scholar-official who immersed himself in poetry, literature, and Confucian learning in addition to performing civil service duties. In modern English, mandarin is also used to refer to any (though usually a senior) civil servant, often in a satirical context, particularly in the United Kingdom and Commonwealth countries.

The speech standard of the Ming and Qing empires was called "the Mandarin language" by European missionaries, translating the Mandarin Chinese: 官話; pinyin: Guānhuà; lit. 'language of the officials', which was current already in the Ming dynasty. The term "Mandarin" is also used to refer to modern Standard Mandarin Chinese, which evolved out of the earlier standard, and to the broader group of Mandarin dialects spoken across northern and southwestern China.

== History ==
From 605 to 1905 in China, mandarins were selected by merit through the extremely rigorous imperial examination. China had civil servants since at least the Zhou dynasty, but most high positions were filled by relatives of the sovereign and the nobility. It was not until the Tang dynasty that imperial examinations were used for placement in the nine-rank system, and the final form of the Mandarin emerged. Mandarins were the founders and core of the Chinese gentry. A governmental office (for example, a central government department or a provincial civil governorate) headed by a mandarin is called a yamen. The mandarins were replaced with a modern civil service after the fall of the Qing dynasty. During the Qing dynasty, the governor of a Chinese province was signified by wearing a mandarin hat-pin made of ruby. Lower ranks were signified by hat-pins of coral, sapphire, lapis lazuli, white jade, gold, and silver.

After becoming free of Chinese rule and setting up its own independent monarchy, Vietnam emulated the Chinese system of mandarins in its civil service. The last mandarins in history were in service of the State of Vietnam (1949–1955). The Confucian examination system in Vietnam was established in 1075 under the Lý dynasty Emperor Lý Nhân Tông and lasted until the Nguyễn dynasty Emperor Khải Định (1919). Elephants were used to guard the examination halls until 1843, when the emperor said it was no longer necessary.

Korea adopted the civil service examinations called Gwageo under the Goryeo and Joseon dynasties. Based on the examinations of imperial China, the gwageo first arose in Unified Silla, gained importance in Goryeo, and was the centrepiece of most education in the Joseon dynasty. The tutelage provided at the hyanggyo, seowon, and Sungkyunkwan was aimed primarily at preparing students for the gwageo and their subsequent careers in government service. Under Joseon law, the high office was closed to those who were not children of officials of the second full rank or higher (Yangban) unless the candidate had passed the gwageo. Those who passed the higher literary examination monopolised the dynasty's high positions of state.

== Ranks under the Qing dynasty ==
The Qing dynasty (1644–1912) divided the bureaucracy into civil and military positions, both having nine grades or ranks, each subdivided into primary and secondary categories. Civil appointments ranged from attendant to the emperor or a Grand Secretary in the Forbidden City (highest) to being a county magistrate, prefectural tax collector, deputy jail warden, deputy police commissioner or tax examiner. Military appointments ranged from being a field marshal or chamberlain of the imperial bodyguard to a third class sergeant, corporal or a first or second class private.

In the table below, "na" is shorthand for the "nth rank, primary" (正n品), which is a higher sub-rank than "nth rank, secondary" (從n品), denoted as "nb" in the table.

Rank	Civil positions	Military positions
1a	Attendants to emperor, Grand Secretaries	Field Marshal, Chamberlain of Imperial Bodyguard
1b	Deputy attendants to emperor, attendants to heir apparent, Presidents of Courts, Boards & Censorates	Banner Unit Lieutenant General, Manchu General-in-Chief (or garrison general, highest official of Manchu city), Provincial Commander in Chief of Chinese Army
2a	Deputy attendants of heir apparent, Vice Pres. of Courts, Boards, Ministers of Imperial Household, Governor General of Provinces	Banner Captain General, Commandants of Divisions, Brigade General
2b	Chancellors of Imperial Household & Hanlin Institute, Superintendent of Finance, Provincial or Assistant Governors	Major General, Colonel
3a	Assistant Vice Presidents in the Censorate, Provincial Judge, Director of Courts & Activities	Brigadiers of Artillery & Musketry, Brigadier of Scouts, Banner Division Colonel
3b	Director of Imperial Banqueting, Director of Imperial Stud, Salt Controller	Banner Brigade Commander Outside Beijing
4a	Director & Assistant Directors of Imperial Household, Courts, Censorate, Foreign Relations & Circuit Attendants	Lieutenant Colonel of Artillery, Musketry & Scouts Captain, Police Major in Beijing
4b	Instructors in Grand Secretariat & Hanlin Institute, Prefects	Captain, Assistant Major Domo in Princely Palaces
5a	Deputy Supervisors of Instruction at Hanlin Institutes, Sub-Prefects	Police Captain, Lieutenant or First Lieutenant
5b	Assistant Instructors and Librarians at Imperial and Hanlin Institutes, Assistant Directors of Boards and Courts, Circuit Censors	Gate Guard Lieutenants, Second Captain
6a	Secretaries & Tutors at Imperial & Hanlin Institutes, Secretaries and Registrars at Imperial Offices, Police Magistrate	Bodyguards, Lieutenants of Artillery, Musketry & Scouts, Second Lieutenants
6b	Assistant Secretaries in Imperial Offices and Law Secretaries, Provincial Deputy Sub-Prefects, Buddhist & Taoist priests	Deputy Police Lieutenant
7a	Assistant Police Magistrates, Studies Registrars, Directors of Studies in Beijing, District magistrates	City Gate Clerk, Sub-Lieutenants
7b	Secretaries in Offices of Assistant Governors, Salt Controllers & Transport Stations	Assistant Major Domo in Nobles' Palaces
8a	Assistant District Magistrates, Prefectural Secretaries, District Director of Studies	Ensigns
8b	Sub-director of Studies, Archivists in Office of Salt Controller	First Class Sergeant
9a	Jail Wardens, District Registrars, Prefectural Archivists	Second Class Sergeant
9b	Prefectural Tax Collector, Deputy Jail Warden, Deputy Police Commissioner, Tax Examiner	Third Class Sergeant, Corporal, First & Second Class Privates

== See also ==
- Cabang Atas – The Chinese gentry of colonial Indonesia
- County magistrate – The official in charge of the xian ("county"), the lowest level of central government in Imperial and early Republican China
- Kapitan Cina – The Chinese officership or mandarinate of colonial Indonesia
- Scholar-official – Learned men in imperial China
- Yangban – The traditional ruling class or gentry of dynastic Korea during the Joseon dynasty
