= Sia (title) =

Noble title

Sia (Chinese: 舍; Pe̍h-ōe-jī: Sià; pinyin: Shè; Javanese: Sio) was a hereditary, noble title of Chinese origin, used mostly in colonial Indonesia. It was borne by the descendants of Chinese officers, who were high-ranking, Chinese civil bureaucrats in the Dutch colonial government, bearing the ranks of Majoor, Kapitein or Luitenant der Chinezen (see: Kapitan Cina).

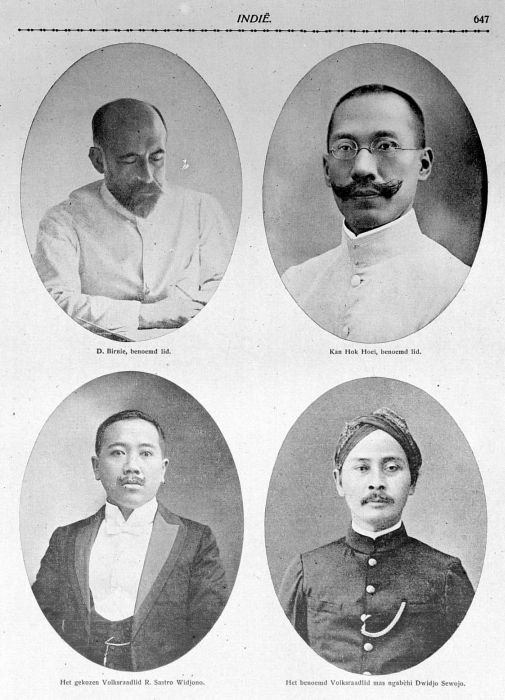
The late colonial statesman Kan Hok Hoei Sia (first row, second from left) with other members of the Volksraad. A Sia, Kan was descended from Han Bwee Kong, the first Dutch-appointed Kapitein der Chinese of Surabaya.

== History ==
As with other Chinese honorifics, the title 'Sia' came at the end of the title holder's name: for example, as in Oey Tamba Sia (1827–1856). The title was used not with its holder's surname, but with his given name, so Tamba Sia instead of Oey Sia. In everyday speech, use of the title was often combined with other honorifics, such as Ako Sia ('elder brother Sia') or Baba Sia ('sir Sia').

Originally, the honorific was used in Imperial China to address certain senior mandarins, the relatives of a mandarin or descendants of the House of Koxinga, formerly the ruling dynasty of the Kingdom of Tungning. In colonial Indonesia, the honorific came to be used as a hereditary title for the descendants of Chinese officers, who were seen as the colonial Indonesian equivalent of the Chinese mandarinate and scholar-gentry.

These title holders and their families constituted the so-called Cabang Atas, the traditional Chinese establishment or gentry of colonial Indonesia. As a class, they dominated the administrative posts of Majoor, Kapitein and Luitenant der Chinezen, or the Chinese officership on a near-hereditary basis. To a significant extent, they also monopolised the colonial government's lucrative revenue farms, which formed the economic backbone of their political influence. To preserve and consolidate their power, families of the Cabang Atas contracted extensive, strategic intermarriages within their social group.

In the later colonial period, it became fashionable among western-educated title holders to refrain from using the title 'Sia', which was seen as an old-fashioned anachronism. This mirrored the decline in the importance of the Chinese officership as a government institution in the early twentieth century, which presaged its eventual abolition in most of the Dutch East Indies with the exception of the colonial capital, Batavia. Indeed, as pointed out by Monique Erkelens, the prestige of the traditional elite declined in the early twentieth century due to changing political and ideological circumstances in late colonial Indonesia and early twentieth-century Asia.

== Title holders ==
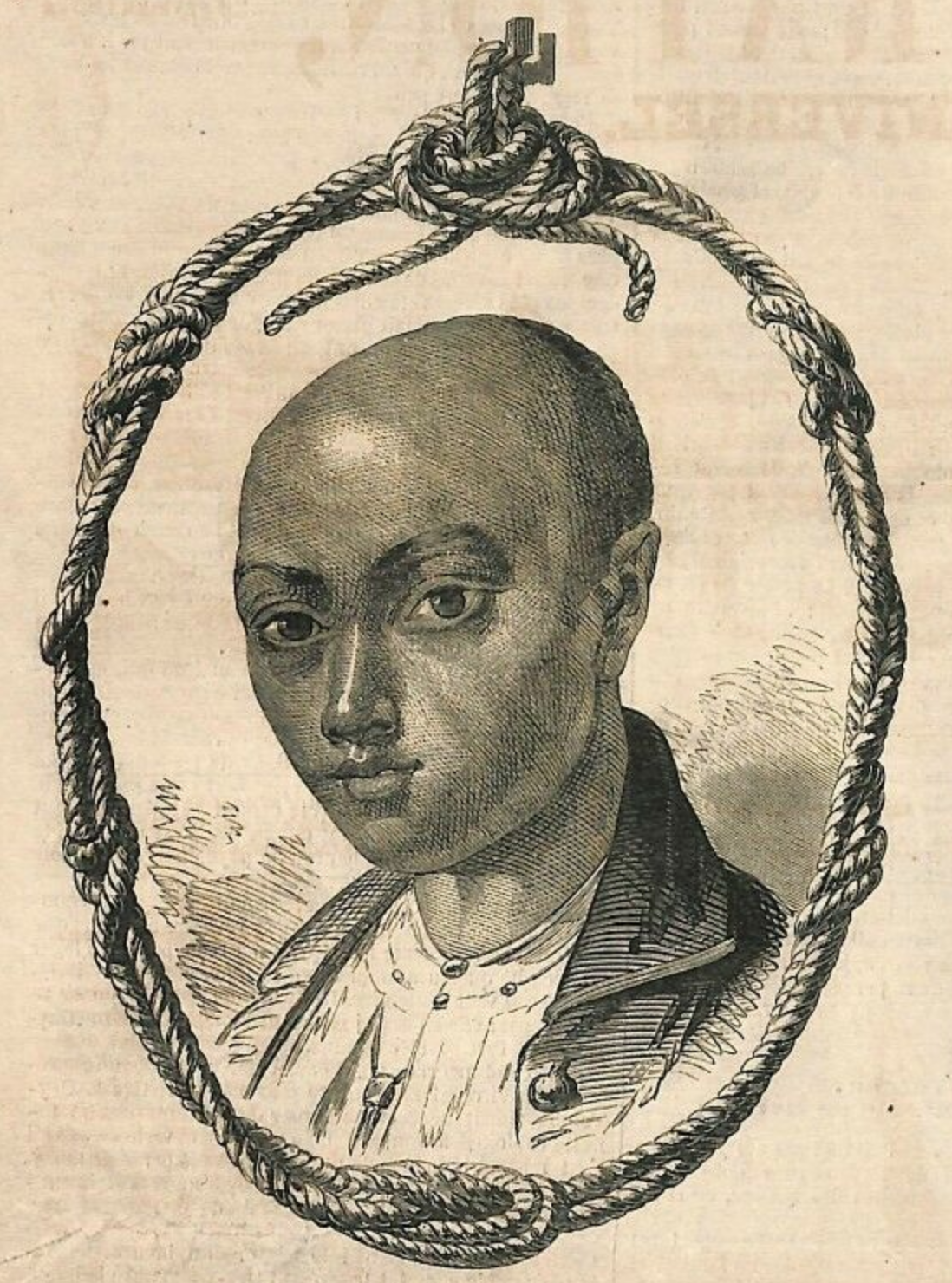
An engraving of Oey Tamba Sia (after M. G. de Coudray, 1857)

As part of the Cabang Atas, Sias played an important role in the history of Indonesia, particularly in relation to the country's ethnic Chinese community.

Prominent Sias include:

- Han Chan Piet, Majoor der Chinezen (1759–1827): government official and landlord
- Han Kik Ko, Majoor der Chinezen, Regent of Probolinggo (1766–1813): government official and landlord
- Lim Ke Tjang, Kapitein der Chinezen of Tegal (1781–1826): official, shipping and sugar magnate
- Tan Eng Goan, 1st Majoor der Chinezen of Batavia (1802–1872)
- Oey Tamba Sia (1827–1856): notorious Batavia playboy
- Lie Tjoe Hong, 3rd Majoor der Chinezen of Batavia (1846–1896)
- Phoa Keng Hek Sia (1857–1937): social reformer and philanthropist
- O. G. Khouw (1874–1927): philanthropist
- Khouw Kim An, last Majoor der Chinezen of Batavia (1875–1945): government bureaucrat
- H. H. Kan (1881–1951): politician, parliamentarian
- Loa Sek Hie (1898–1965): politician, parliamentarian, social worker
- Kwee Thiam Tjing (1900–1974): writer, journalist and left-wing political activist
- Phoa Liong Gie (1904–1983): newspaper publisher, politician, parliamentarian

== See also ==
- Kapitan Cina
- Cabang Atas
- Kong Koan & Tiong Hoa Hwee Koan
- Scholar-gentry and landed gentry in China
- Chinese honorifics
- The House of Koxinga
