= Landed gentry in China =

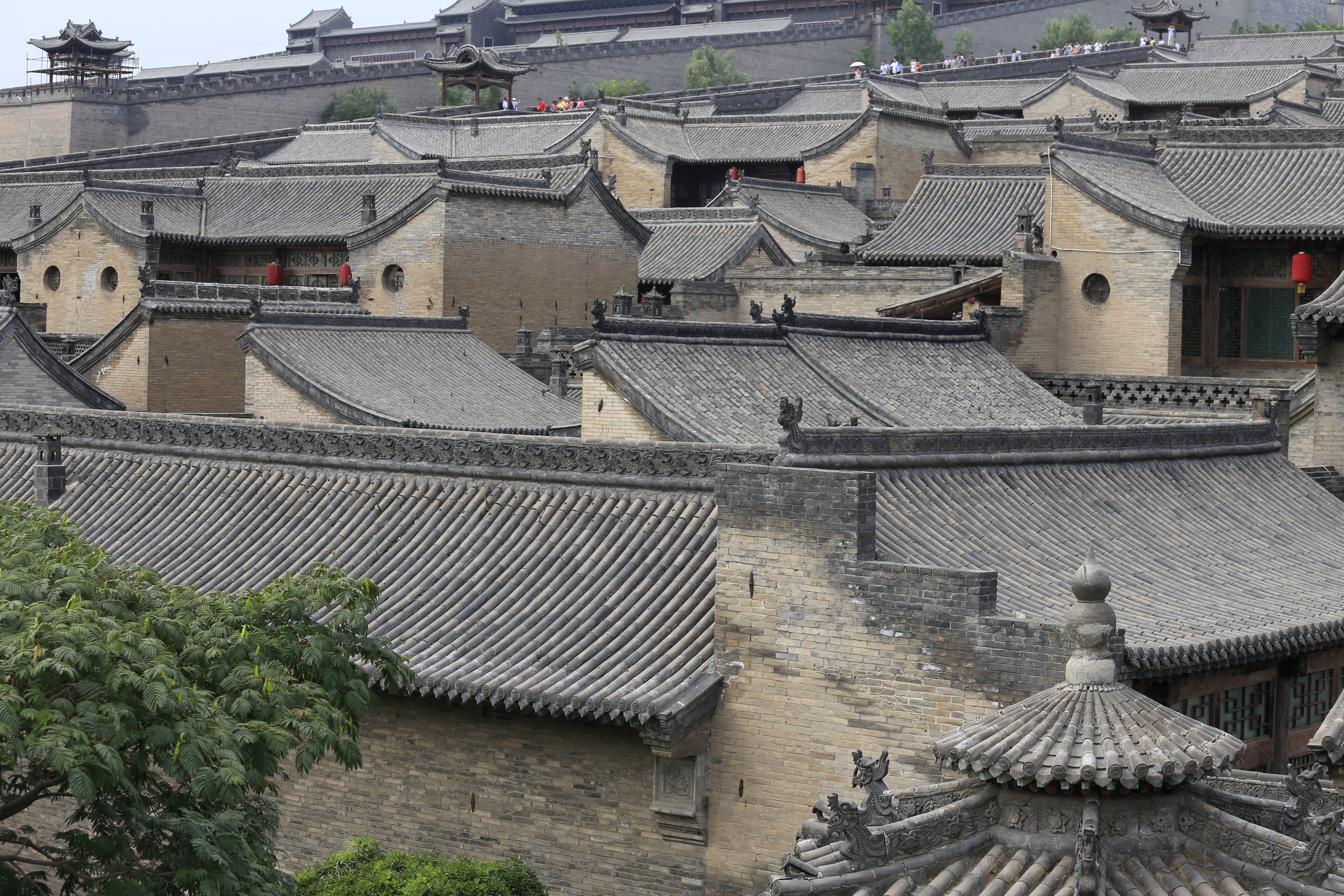
Wang family home, a prominent Shanxi gentry family, in Lingshi County

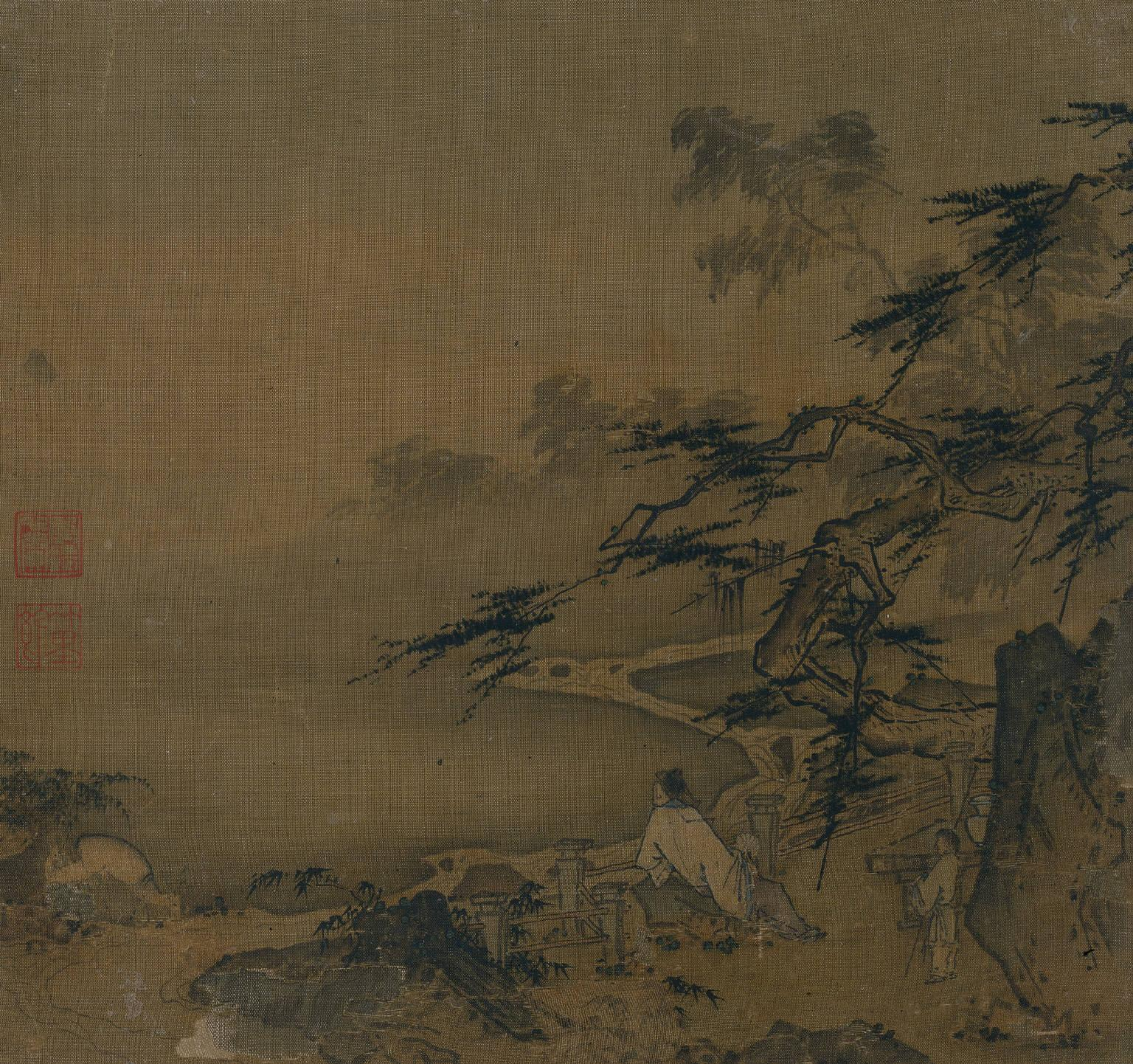
The art of gentleman scholars tended to idealize retreat into the beauties of nature and contemplation, an idea parallel to the travel literature of Su Shi and Yuan Hongdao; painting by Song dynasty artist Ma Yuan, c. 1200–1230.

The gentry, or landed gentry in China was the elite who also held additional privileged status through passing the Imperial exams, which made them eligible to hold government office. These literati, or scholar-officials, (shenshi 紳士 or jinshen 縉紳), also called 士紳 shishen "scholar gentry" or 鄉紳 xiangshen "local gentry", held a virtual monopoly on office holding, and overlapped with an unofficial elite of the wealthy. The Tang and Song dynasties expanded the civil service exam to replace the nine-rank system which favored hereditary and largely military aristocrats. As a social class they included retired mandarins or their families and descendants. Owning land was often their way of preserving wealth.

== Confucian classes ==
The Confucian ideal of the four occupations ranked the scholar-official above farmers, artisans, and merchants below them in descending order, but this ideal fell short of describing society. Unlike a caste this status was not inherited. In theory, any male child could study, pass the exams, and attain office. In practice, however, only gentry families were able to properly educate their sons and used their connections with local officials to pass the exams. The low class Boat Dwellers were banned from taking exams.

Members of the gentry were expected to be an example to their community as Confucian gentlemen. They often retired to landed estates, where they lived on the rent from tenant farmers. The sons of upper class gentry aspired to pass the imperial exams and continue the family legacy. Rich merchants used their wealth to educate their sons in hopes of entering the civil service. In some rare cases financially desperate gentry married into merchant families which led to a breakdown of the old class structure.

With the abolition of the exam system after the Republican era of ended the scholar-official as a legal group.

== See also ==
- Chinese nobility
- Society and culture of the Han dynasty
- Cabang Atas, the Chinese gentry of colonial Indonesia
- Dou dizhu, Chinese game of 'fighting the landlord'

== Sources ==
- Elman, Benjamin A. (2009), "Civil Service Examinations (Keju)" (PDF), Berkshire Encyclopedia of China, Great Barrington, MA: Berkshire, pp. 405–410
