= Arnold Wright =

Arnold Wright (1858–1941) was from 1888 to 1900 the London editor of the Yorkshire Post.

He was trained for journalism under his father, and in 1879 he went to India to take work on the Times of India.

In Australia he was private secretary to Anna Brassey and was on board the Sunbeam when she died. After her death he was involved in the production of her posthumously published work The Last Voyage.

After leaving the Yorkshire Post he wrote and edited a number of travel reference books, notably the Twentieth Century Impressions series. He visited Ceylon in 1906, to complete that edition of the series.

Wright was also the part author of Parliament, Past and Present.

In 1933 he was awarded a Civil list pension in recognition of his literary work.

== Works ==
- Wright, Arnold (1891), Baboo English as 'tis writ: being curiosities of Indian journalism, T. F. Unwin
- Twentieth Century Impressions – Editor in Chief or Historian in most volumes between 1901 and 1914
  - Wright, Arnold; Breakspear, Oliver (1908). Twentieth century impressions of Siam : its history, people, commerce, industries, and resources. New York: Lloyds Greater Britain Publishing. ISBN 9748495000.
- Wright, Arnold; Reid, T. H. (1912), The Malay Peninsula: a record of British progress in the Middle East, Unwin
- Wright, Arnold, Early English Adventurers in the East, London: A. Melrose
- Wright, Arnold (1914), Disturbed Dublin: the story of the great strike of 1913-14, with description of the industries of the Irish capital, Longmans, Green, and co
- Wright, Arnold (1918), Annesley of Surat and his Times: the true story of the mythical Wesley fortune, A. Melrose, ltd
- Wright, Arnold; Smith, Philip, 1853–1922 (1920), Parliament Past and Present: a popular and picturesque account of a thousand years in the Palace of Westminster, the home of the mother of parliaments, Hutchinson
