= Landed gentry (disambiguation) =

Landed gentry usually refers to a largely historical British social class consisting in theory of landowners who could live entirely from rental income, or at least had a country estate.

Landed gentry may also refer to:

- Burke's Landed Gentry, a directory of British landed gentry
- American gentry, wealthy landowning class in the Southern United States
- Landed gentry in China, the elite shenshi class in China
- Polish landed gentry, a historical group of hereditary landowners who held manorial estates in Poland

== See also ==
- Gentry (disambiguation)
- Landed (disambiguation)
