= Community leader =

Person perceived to represent a community

Community leader is a designation, often by secondary sources (particularly in the media), for a person widely perceived to represent a community. A simple way to understand community leadership is to see it as leadership in, for and by the community. Community 'is frequently based in place and so is local, although it can also represent a community of common interest, purpose or practice'.

Community leadership is a specific form of the general concept of leadership. It is frequently based in place and so is local, although it can also represent a community of common interest, purpose or practice. It can be individual or group leadership, voluntary or paid. In many localities it is provided by a combination of local volunteers, business and government and is best served by what is called "place management", ie. a combination within a region of Government resources, professional and business skills and the energies of the local community [Sorenson & Epps, 1996:115-117; Osborne & Gaebler, 1993].

Community leaders are not necessarily elected to their positions, and usually have no legal powers, but they are often used by the media and the police as a way of determining the general feeling within a particular community, or acting as a point of liaison between that community and authorities.

== Building healthy communities ==
Community leadership together with knowledge and skills, volunteering, networks and partnerships have been identified as among the five key indicators for stronger communities and civil society

Effective community leadership is increasingly recognised as an important contributor to local social development. The leadership approach is based on a premise that individual development enhances community capacity. This is accomplished through training that equips people with the tools and understanding of the decision making process and allows their views to be expressed and incorporated into future development and planning. The acquisition of new skills also enhances effectiveness in addressing issues affecting their communities. It should also strengthen the community's capacity to identify opportunities and address crises in innovative ways.
