= Cabang Atas =

Chinese gentry of colonial Indonesia

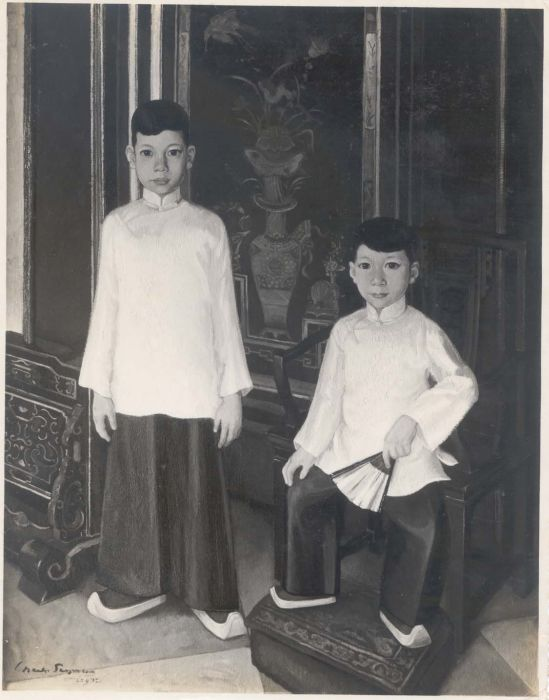
Portrait of Yan and Coen, grandsons of Khouw Kim An, Majoor der Chinezen of Batavia (by Charles Sayers, circa 1937).

The Cabang Atas (Van Ophuijsen Spelling System: Tjabang Atas)—literally 'upper branch' in Indonesian—was the traditional Chinese establishment or gentry of colonial Indonesia. They were the families and descendants of the Chinese officers, high-ranking colonial civil bureaucrats with the ranks of Majoor, Kapitein and Luitenant der Chinezen. They were referred to as the baba bangsawan (‘Chinese gentry’) in Indonesian, and the ba-poco in Java Hokkien.

As a privileged social class, they exerted a powerful influence on the political, economic and social life of pre-revolutionary Indonesia, in particular on its local Chinese community. Their institutional control of the Chinese officership declined with the colonial ethical policy of the early twentieth century, but their political, economic and social influence lasted until the Indonesian revolution (1945-1950).

== Origin of term ==
The phrase Cabang Atas was first used by the colonial Indonesian historian Liem Thian Joe in his book Riwajat Semarang (published in 1933). The term refers to a small group of old gentry families that dominated the Dutch colonial institution of the Chinese officership (see 'Kapitan Cina'); this was colonial Indonesia's equivalent of the Chinese mandarinate. As a class, they intermarried to maintain their political and economic power, owned extensive agricultural landholdings and monopolised the colonial government's lucrative revenue farms.

In older literature, the Cabang Atas is referred to as the baba bangsawan (Indonesian for 'Chinese gentry').

== History ==
=== Origin and rise ===
The oldest families of the Cabang Atas traced their roots in Indonesia back to early Chinese allies and compradores of the Dutch East India Company, in a period that lasted until the latter's bankruptcy in 1799. Many of these Chinese magnates — such as Souw Beng Kong, first Kapitein der Chinezen of Batavia (1580-1644); or the sons of Han Siong Kong (1673-1743), founder of the Han family of Lasem — played an instrumental role in establishing Dutch colonial rule in Indonesia in the seventeenth and eighteenth centuries. Some families came of gentry stock in China, but many more started off as successful merchant families. They shared some common traits with the scholar-gentry of Imperial China, but accumulated much greater dynastic wealth thanks partly to the protection of Dutch colonial law.

The foundation of their political power was their near-hereditary control of the bureaucratic posts of Majoor, Kapitein and Luitenant der Chinezen. This gave them a high degree of political and legal jurisdiction over the local Chinese community. By colonial Indonesian tradition, descendants of Chinese officers bore the hereditary title Sia.

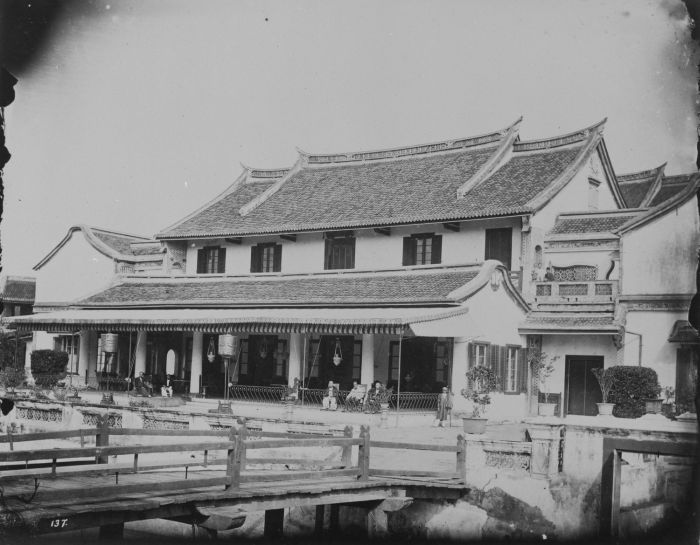
Kebon Dalem, residence of Be Biauw Tjoan, Majoor der Chinezen of Semarang.

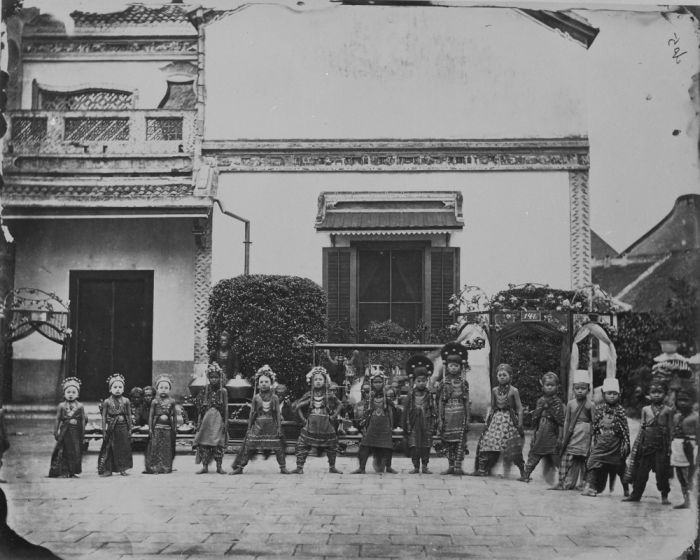
Majoor Be Biauw Tjoan's private gamelan orchestra.

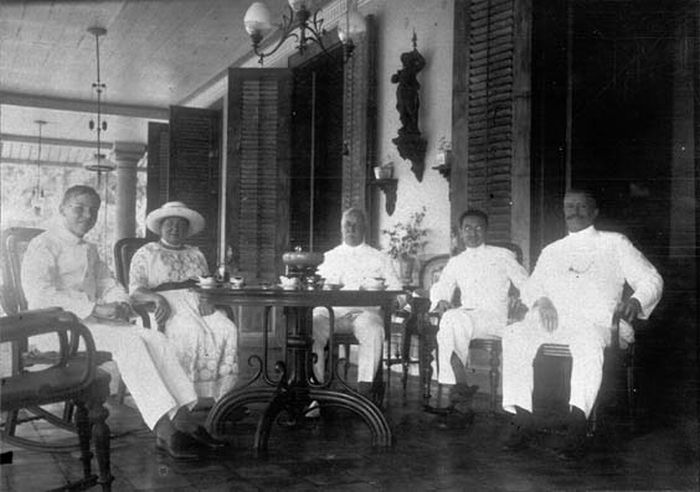
Oey Djie San, Kapitein der Chinezen of Tangerang with European guests.

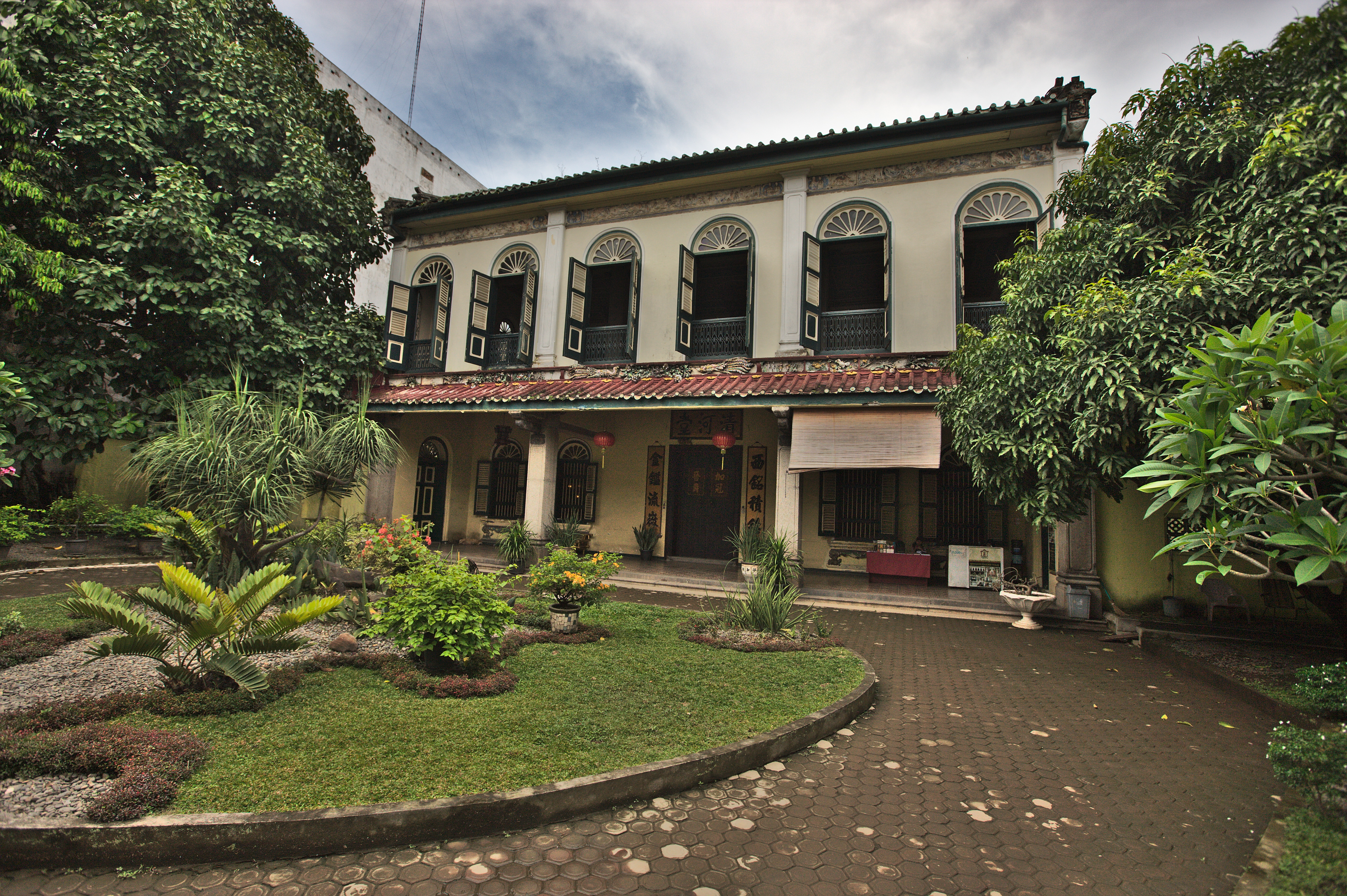
The residence of Majoor Tjong A Fie in Medan

In addition, most families of the Cabang Atas owned particuliere landerijen or private domains in the Ommelanden (rural hinterland) of Batavia (now Jakarta); or appanage leaseholds in the Javanese princely states. This gave them significant seigniorial powers over the indigenous peasants living on their landholdings, but also earned them much enmity and resentment.

The economic foundation of the Cabang Atas, as pointed out by the American historian James R. Rush, was their monopolistic control of the colonial government's pachten (revenue or tax farms), in particular the highly lucrative opium pacht. These farms were auctioned off with much fanfare and ceremony at the local colonial administrator's residence to the highest bidders, and were most frequently won by members of the Cabang Atas or others allied to, or backed, by them. Menghong Chen highlights, however, that among some more established Cabang Atas families, commercial activities as represented by the revenue farms were looked down upon, hence a gradual shift towards landownership and agriculture. In any case, the accumulation of great fortunes among Cabang Atas families received the protection of Dutch colonial law. This legal certainty gave a firm basis to the creation of long-lasting bureaucratic and landowning dynasties of great wealth in colonial Indonesia that were not as common in pre-revolutionary China.

Ethnically and culturally, families of the Cabang Atas were overwhelmingly creolised 'Peranakan Chinese'. There was extensive intermarriage between Cabang Atas families in order to consolidate their political power and influence, as well as estates and fortunes. Social mobility, however, was possible; Cabang Atas families sometimes took in successful totok, or newly arrived, settlers as sons-in-law. As cited by the historian Ong Hok Ham, notable examples included the late nineteenth-century, totok businessman Oei Tjie Sien (1835–1900), who married a middle-class Peranakan woman; and the latter's Peranakan son Oei Tiong Ham, Majoor der Chinezen (1866–1924), who firmly sealed the family's social ascent by marrying into the Cabang Atas and by his eventual elevation to the Chinese officership.

=== Modern history ===
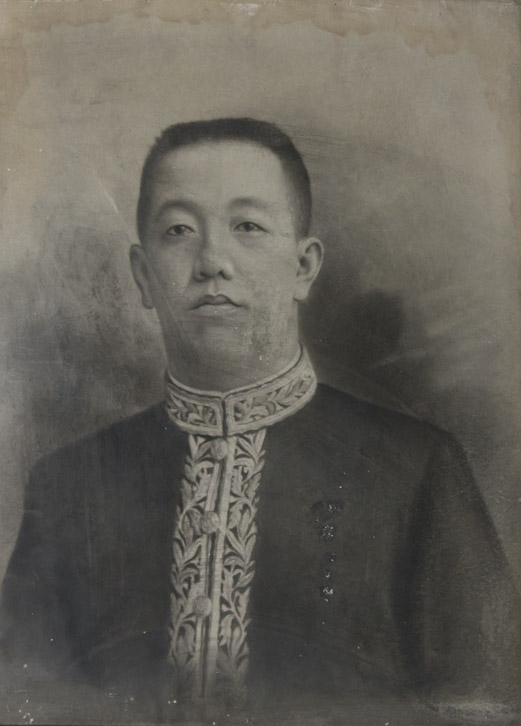
Official portrait of Khouw Kim An, the 5th and last Majoor der Chinezen of Batavia

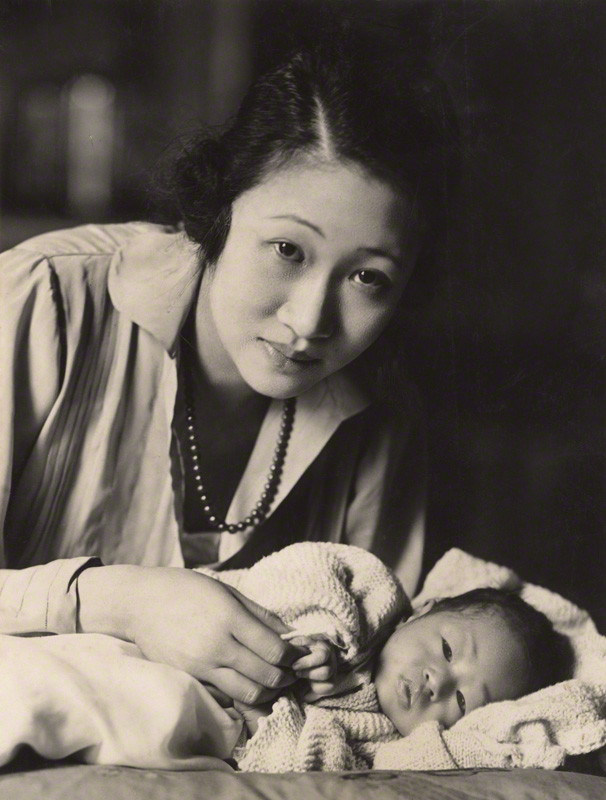
Madame Wellington Koo, daughter of Majoor Oei Tiong Ham and First Lady of pre-communist China

In the early twentieth century, in keeping with their so-called 'ethical policy', the Dutch colonial authorities made a concerted effort to appoint government officials, including Chinese officers, based on merit rather than family background. Some of these candidates came from Peranakan families outside the Cabang Atas, such as the Semarang-based, left-wing newspaper owner editor and journalist, Sie Hian Liang, Lieutenant der Chinezen. Also not born into the Cabang Atas were a number of significant totok appointees, such as Tjong A Fie, Majoor der Chinezen (1860–1921) in Medan, Lie Hin Liam, Luitenant der Chinezen in Tangerang and Khoe A Fan, Luitenant der Chinezen in Batavia.

Nonetheless, descendants of the Cabang Atas continued to feature prominently in the officership until the end of colonial rule: for example, Han Tjiong Khing, the last Majoor der Chinezen of Surabaya, was a direct descendant of Han Bwee Kong, the city's first Dutch-appointed Kapitein der Chinezen.

Beyond the Chinese officership, members of the Cabang Atas took a leading role in the emerging modernization social and cultural movement of the late colonial period. The influential Confucian and educational organization Tiong Hoa Hwee Koan, founded in 1900, was headed for many decades by its founding President, Phoa Keng Hek Sia, scion of a Cabang Atas family, and dominated by others of Phoa's class and background. The aim of the organization was to renew and purify the practice of Confucianism in the Dutch East Indies, and to introduce modern educational opportunities to the colony's Chinese subjects. Another important organization was the charity foundation Ati Soetji, headed for many decades by the women's rights activist Aw Tjoei Lan, better known as Njonja Kapitein Lie Tjian Tjoen, who as the wife, daughter and daughter-in-law of Chinese officers came from the ranks of the Cabang Atas.

Politically, the Cabang Atas also pioneered Chinese-Indonesian involvement in modern politics. They were mainly associated with Chung Hwa Hui or CHH, a modern political party that was seen as the mouthpiece of the colonial Chinese establishment. CHH's chairman was none other than Majoor Han Tjiong Khing's distant cousin, the Dutch-educated landlord H. H. Kan, a doyen of the Cabang Atas and landowning gentry of Batavia. CHH representatives in Indonesia's first legislature, the Volksraad, were largely scions of the Cabang Atas: presided by Kan, they included Jo Heng Kam, Lieutenant der Chinezen, Loa Sek Hie and Han Tiauw Tjong. Due to their largely establishment background, progressive elements dubbed CHH's parliamentary arm as the 'Packard group' after the expensive cars many of them used.

Their close proximity to Dutch colonial authorities meant that many families of the Cabang Atas were early adopters of the Dutch language and many European cultural and social mores. European education and westernisation among the Cabang Atas began in the second half of the nineteenth century, and became the norm by the beginning of the twentieth century (Chinese language and history were often untaught in schools). By the start of the twentieth century, Dutch had become the most commonly spoken language at the homes of most families of the Cabang Atas. While tying them ever closer to the colonial authorities, the European outlook of the class put them at odds with the overwhelming majority of the Chinese-Indonesian population they had traditionally led.

Already attacked for their perceived Dutch sympathies in the late colonial period, the Cabang Atas bore the brunt of the Indonesian Revolution from 1945 until 1949. The end of Dutch colonial rule in 1950 saw the exile and emigration of many families of the Cabang Atas. The turbulent early decades of Indonesian independence also ensured an end to their centuries-long dominating and privileged position in Indonesian political, economic and social life.

== Titles ==
The ba-poco or Cabang Atas used an elaborate system of titles in the Dutch East Indies:

- Padoeka ('your Excellency'): a Malay prefix used by Chinese officers
- Twa Kongsi ('your Lordship' or 'my Lord'): used by Chinese officers
- Twa Kongsi Nio ('your Ladyship' or 'my Lady'): used by the wives of Chinese officers
- Kongsi and Kongsi Nio ('my Lord'; 'my Lady'): short form of the above or the styles of descendants of Chinese officers
- Sia: a hereditary title used by male descendants of Chinese officers

== List of Cabang Atas families ==
- The Han family of Lasem
- The Khouw family of Tamboen
- The Tan family of Cirebon
- The Lie family of Pasilian
- The Tio family of Pasar Baroe
- The Lauw-Sim-Zecha family
- The Kwee family of Ciledug
- The Oei family of Simongan

== See also ==
- Kapitan Cina: the political institution dominated by families of the Cabang Atas in colonial Indonesia.
- Sia: a hereditary title borne by scions of the Cabang Atas.
- Scholar-gentry and Landed gentry in China.
- Kong Koan & Tiong Hoa Hwee Koan
