= Kapitan Cina =

High-ranking government position in the civil administration

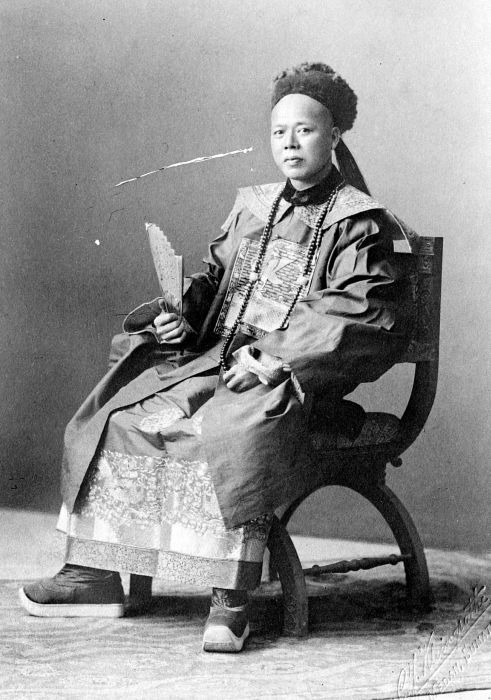
Tjong Ah Fie, Majoor der Chinezen of Medan

Kapitan Cina (Note: also spelled Kapitan China or Capitan China or Capitan Chino) (lit. 'Captain of the Chinese'; Chinese: 華人甲必丹; Pe̍h-ōe-jī: Hôa-jîn Kap-pit-tan; pinyin: Huárén Jiǎbìdān; Dutch: Kapitein der Chinezen; Spanish: Capitán Chino), was a high-ranking government position in the civil administration of colonial Indonesia, Malaya, Singapore, Borneo and the Philippines. Office holders exercised varying degrees of power and influence: from near-sovereign political and legal jurisdiction over local Chinese communities, to ceremonial precedence for community leaders. Corresponding posts existed for other ethnic groups, such as Kapitan Arab and Kapitan Keling for the local Arab and Indian communities respectively.

== Pre-colonial origin ==
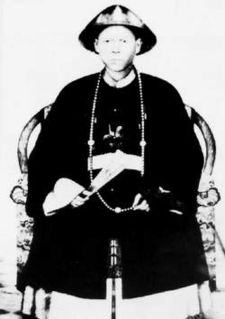
Kapitan Cina Yap Ah Loy, founding father of modern Kuala Lumpur

The origin of the office, under various different native titles, goes back to court positions in the precolonial states of Southeast Asia, such as the Sultanates of Malacca in the Malay Peninsula, the Sultanate of Banten in Java, and the Kingdom of Siam in mainland Southeast Asia. Many rulers assigned self-governance to local foreign communities, including the Chinese, under their own headmen. Often, these headmen also had responsibilities beyond their local communities, in particular in relation to foreign trade or tax collection.

For example, Souw Beng Kong and Lim Lak Ko, the first two Kapiteins der Chinezen of Batavia, present-day Jakarta, started off as high-ranking courtiers and functionaries to the Sultans of Banten prior to their defection to the Dutch East India Company in the early seventeenth century. Similarly, the court title of Chao Praya Chodeuk Rajasrethi in Thailand under the early Chakri dynasty combined the roles of Chinese headman and head of the Department of Eastern Affairs and Commerce. In the late nineteenth century, Kapitan Cina Yap Ah Loy, arguably the founding father of modern Kuala Lumpur, capital of Malaysia, served as Chinese headman while holding the Malay court position of Sri Indra Perkasa Wijaya Bakti.

== Role in European colonialism ==
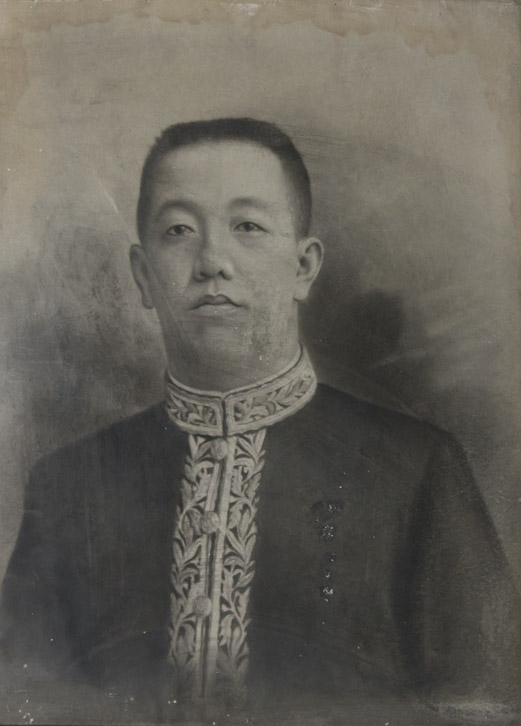
Official portrait of Khouw Kim An, the 5th and last Majoor der Chinezen of Batavia

When Europeans established colonial rule in Southeast Asia, this system of indirect rule was adopted: first by the Portuguese when they took over Malacca in 1511, then in subsequent centuries by the Dutch in the Dutch East Indies, as well as the British in British Malaya and Borneo. Use of the title 'Kapitan' in the civil administration has parallels in the sixteenth-century, colonial Portuguese Captaincies of Brazil.

Since then, a long succession of Kapitans formed an intrinsic part of colonial history in Southeast Asia. Kapitans were pivotal in consolidating European colonial rule, and in facilitating large-scale Chinese migration to Southeast Asia, or 'Nanyang' as the region is known in Chinese history. Instrumental to the establishment of Dutch colonialism in Indonesia were Chinese allies, such as Kapitein Souw Beng Kong and Kapitein Lim Lak Ko in early seventeenth-century Batavia and Banten; and the brothers Soero Pernollo and Kapitein Han Bwee Kong in early eighteenth-century East Java. In British territories, important Chinese allies and collaborators include Koh Lay Huan, first Kapitan Cina of Penang in the late eighteenth century; Choa Chong Long and Tan Tock Seng, the founding Kapitans of Singapore in the early nineteenth century; and Yap Ah Loy, Kapitan Cina of Kuala Lumpur in the late nineteenth century.

Yet due to their power and influence, many Kapitans were also focal points of resistance against European colonial rule. For instance, in the aftermath of Batavia's Chinese Massacre of 1740, the city's Chinese headman, Kapitein Nie Hoe Kong, became an important player in the so-called Chinese War, or 'Perang Cina', between the Dutch East India Company and a Chinese-Javanese alliance. Over a century later, the Kapiteins of the kongsi republics in Borneo led their people in the so-called Kongsi Wars against Dutch colonial incursions from the late nineteenth until the early twentieth century.

With the consolidation of colonial rule, the Kapitans became part of the civil bureaucracy in Portuguese, Dutch and British colonies. They exercised both executive and judicial powers over local Chinese communities under the colonial authorities. In British territories, the position lost its importance over time, gradually becoming an honorary rank for community leaders before its final abolition in the late nineteenth or the start of the twentieth century. In contrast, the position was consolidated and further elaborated in Dutch territories, and remained an important part of the Dutch colonial government until the Second World War and the end of colonialism.

== The institution in colonial Indonesia ==
The institution of Kapitan Cina was most fully developed in colonial Indonesia, where an intricate hierarchy of Chinese officieren, or Chinese officers, was put in place by the Dutch authorities. The officers acted as Hoofden der Chinezen ('Heads of the Chinese'), that is as the legal and political administrators of the local Chinese community. There were three separate ranks of Majoor, Kapitein and Luitenant der Chinezen depending on the incumbent's seniority in the administrative structure, the importance of their territory or their own personal merit. Thus, the post of Majoor only existed in the colony's principal cities: Batavia, Bandoeng, Semarang and Surabaya in Java, and Medan in Sumatra. The Majoor in each of these jurisdictions presided over lower-ranking officers, who sat in council together as the Kong Koan (Dutch: 'Chinese Raad'; English: 'Chinese Council') of their local territory. In jurisdictions deemed less important, the presiding officer bore the rank of Kapitein or Luitenant.

The officers-in-council acted as an executive governmental body, implementing the directives of the colonial government, as well as a court of law on family and customary law and petty crimes. They were seen as the colonial equivalent of a Yamen, or governmental magistracy, in Imperial China. Below the Chinese officers were the Wijkmeesters or ward masters in charge of constituent districts within each officer's territory. In addition, the officers also had recourse to their own basic police force to enforce their executive and judicial decisions.

These officerial titles were also given by the Dutch colonial government on an honorary basis to retired officers or meritorious community leaders. Thus, a retired Luitenant might be granted the honorary rank of Luitenant-titulair der Chinezen; or in very rare cases, a retired officer might be given an honorary promotion, such as the famously wealthy Luitenant Oei Tiong Ham, who became an honorary Majoor upon retirement from the colonial administration. Titular lieutenancies or captaincies were also sometimes granted to meritorious community leaders outside the bureaucracy.

Chinese officers in colonial Indonesia
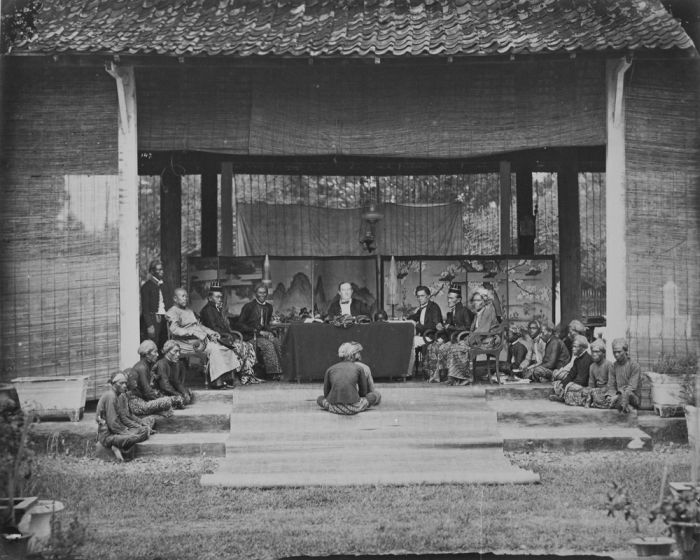
A court of law in Jepara, Central Java with the European, native, Chinese and Arab officials of the district (late 19th century).

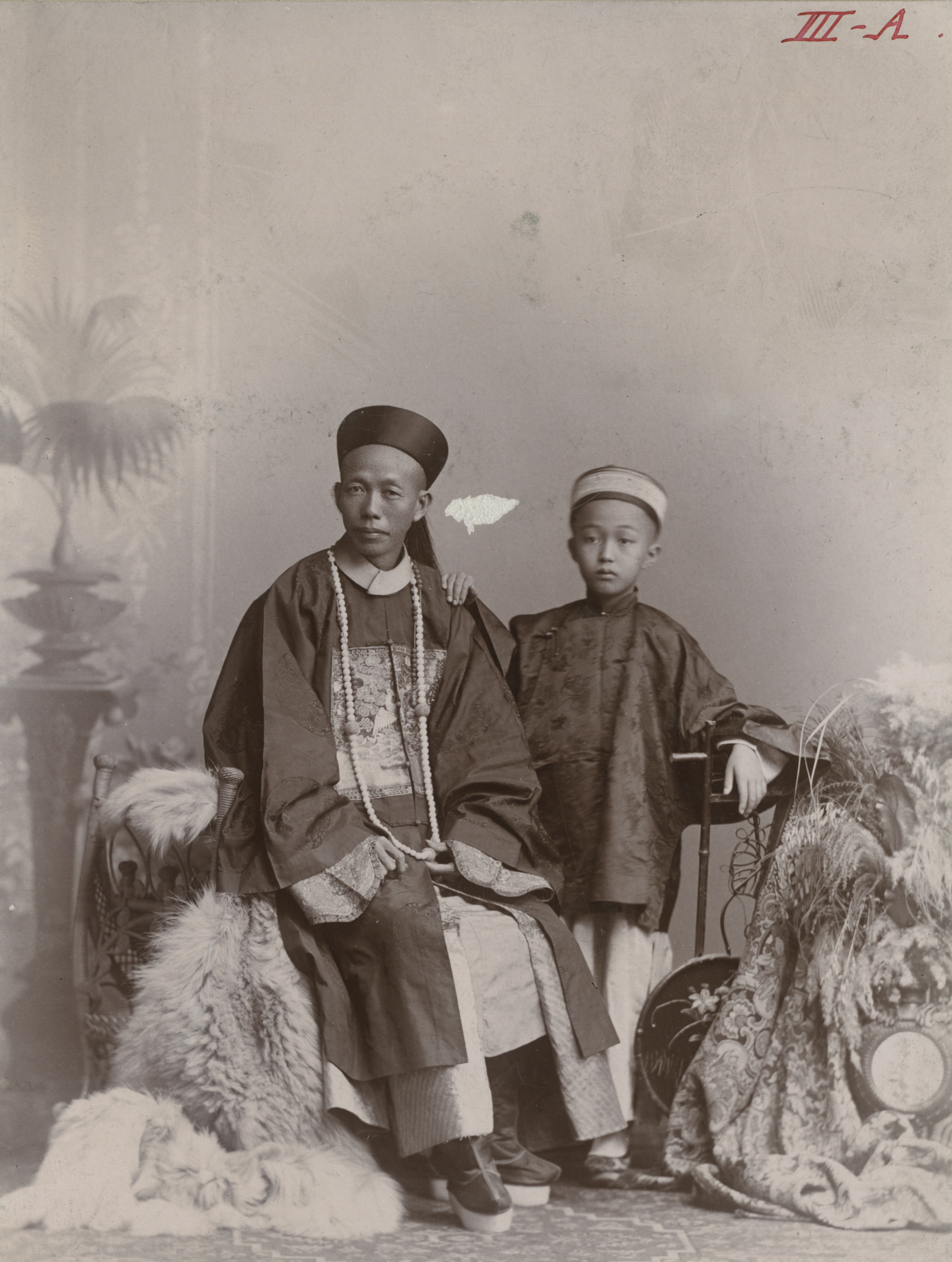
Tjong Yong Hian, Majoor der Chinezen of Medan in 1900.

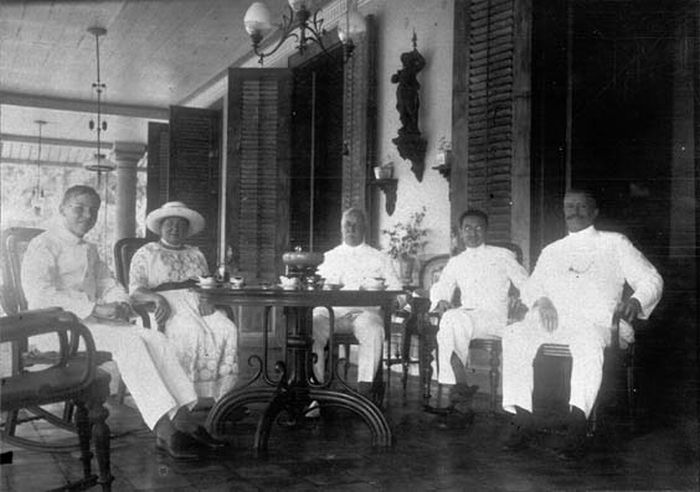
Oey Djie San, Kapitein der Chinezen of Tangerang, with European guests (early 20th century).

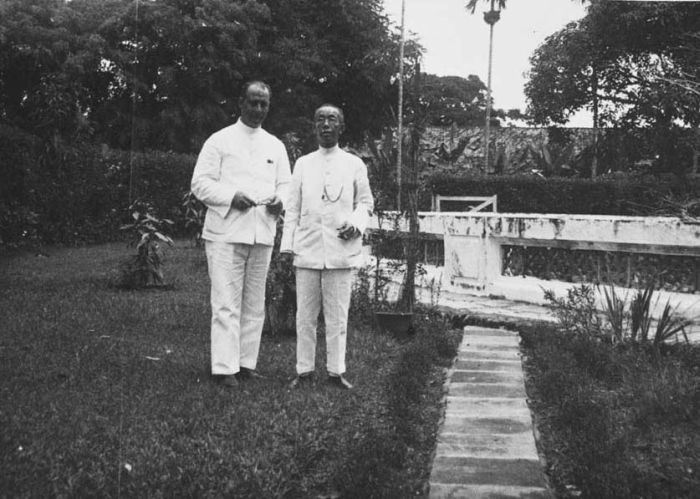
Khouw Kim An, Majoor der Chinezen of Batavia with a European friend (early 20th century).

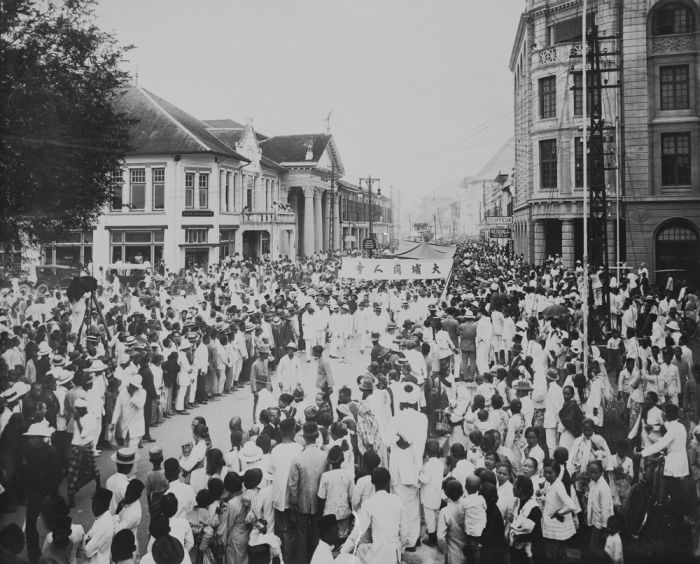
Funeral of Tjong A Fie, Majoor der Chinezen of Medan in 1921.

Sitting Chinese officers, together with Arab and Indian officers, formed part of the colonial government's Bestuur over de Vreemde Oosterlingen or the Department of 'Foreign Orientals'. As part of the Dutch policy of Indirect Rule, all the three racial castes in the Indies - Europeans, 'Foreign Orientals' and natives - had political and legal self-governance under the oversight of the Dutch government. The native counterpart of the officers was the Pamong Pradja, or the native civil service, with its equally elaborate hierarchy of Regents, Wedanas, Asistent-Wedanas and Camats.

The Chinese officership came to be dominated on a near-hereditary basis by a small, oligarchic group of interrelated, landowning families. They formed the so-called Cabang Atas, or the traditional Chinese establishment or gentry of colonial Indonesia. As a social class, they exerted a powerful social, economic and political influence on colonial life in Indonesia beyond the local Chinese community. The descendants of Chinese officers are entitled by colonial Indonesian custom to the hereditary title of 'Sia'.

In the early twentieth century, in keeping with their so-called 'Ethical Policy', the Dutch colonial authorities made concerted efforts to appoint Chinese officers and other government officials based on merit. Some of these candidates came from outside traditional Cabang Atas families, including totok appointees, such as Tjong A Fie, Majoor der Chinezen (1860–1921) in Medan, Lie Hin Liam, Luitenant der Chinezen in Tangerang, and Khoe A Fan, Luitenant der Chinezen in Batavia.

Despite Dutch attempts at reforming the Chinese officership, the institution and the Cabang Atas as a traditional elite both came under attack from modernizing voices in the late colonial era. Their loss of prestige and respect within the local Chinese community led the Dutch colonial government to phase out the officership gradually all through the early twentieth century. Officerships were often left vacant when incumbents retired or died. The only exception, as noted by the historian Mona Lohanda, was the Chinese officership of Batavia, which was retained by the Dutch authorities thanks to its antiquity, pre-eminent position in the Chinese bureaucratic hierarchy and symbolic value to Dutch colonial authority. The institution came to an abrupt end with the Japanese invasion during the Second World War, and the death in 1945 of Khouw Kim An, the last Majoor der Chinezen of Batavia and the last serving Chinese officer in the Dutch colonial government.

== Titles ==
Chinese officers in the Dutch East Indies used an elaborate system of styles and titles:

- Padoeka ('your Excellency'): a Malay prefix used by Chinese officers
- Twa Kongsi ('your Lordship' or 'my Lord'): used by Chinese officers
- Twa Kongsi Nio ('your Ladyship' or 'my Lady'): used by the wives of Chinese officers
- Kongsi and Kongsi Nio ('my Lord'; 'my Lady'): short form of the above or the styles of descendants of Chinese officers

== See also ==
- List of Kapitan Cina
- Kapitan Arab
- Kapitan Keling
- Kangchu system
- Kong Koan
- Kongsi federations
- Peranakans

== Bibliography ==
- Trocki, Carl A. (2007). Prince of pirates: the temenggongs and the development of Johor and Singapore, 1784-1885 (2nd ed.). Singapore: NUS Press. ISBN 978-9971-69-376-3.
- Hwang, In-wŏn (2003). Personalized politics: the Malaysian state under Mahathir. Singapore: Institute of Southeast Asian Studies. ISBN 978-981-230-185-7.
- Lohanda, Mona (1996). The kapitan Cina of Batavia, 1837-1942: a history of Chinese establishment in colonial society. Jakarta: Djambatan. ISBN 978-979-428-257-1.
- Ooi, Keat Gin, ed. (2004). Southeast Asia: a historical encyclopedia, from Angkor Wat to East Timor. Santa Barbara, Calif: ABC-CLIO. ISBN 978-1-57607-770-2.
