= Yunjian =

Traditional Chinese shawl and motif

yunjian cloud collar phoenix collar
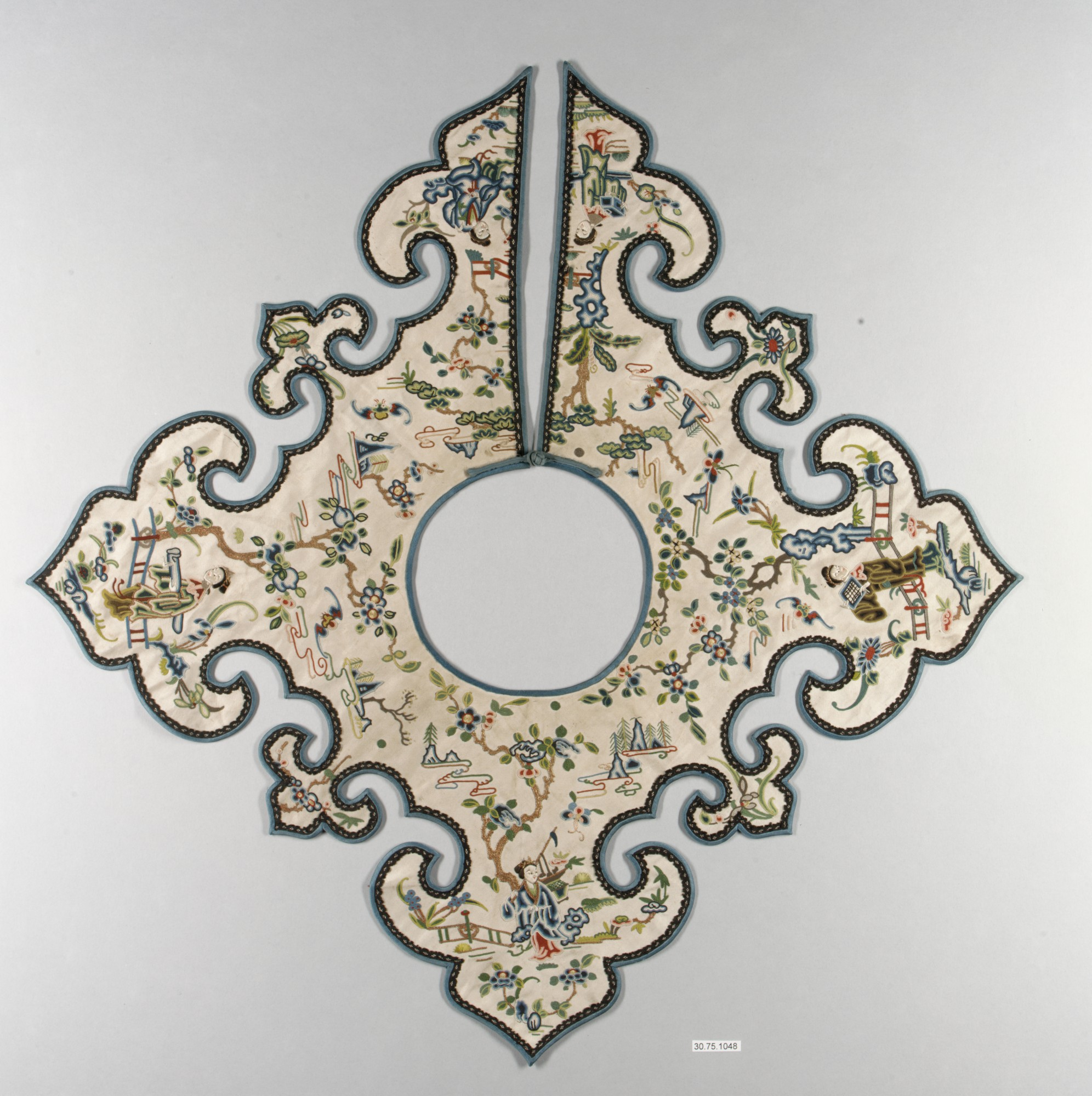
- A Qing-era yunjian
- Traditional Chinese: 雲肩
- Simplified Chinese: 云肩
- Literal meaning: cloud(y) shoulder
Transcriptions
Standard Mandarin
- Hanyu Pinyin: yúnjiān
- Wade–Giles: yün-chien

pijian
- Traditional Chinese: 披肩
- Simplified Chinese: 披肩
- Literal meaning: shoulder covering shawl
Transcriptions
Standard Mandarin
- Hanyu Pinyin: pījiān
- Wade–Giles: p'i-chien

dajian
- Traditional Chinese: 搭肩
- Simplified Chinese: 搭肩
- Literal meaning: shoulder addition
Transcriptions
Standard Mandarin
- Hanyu Pinyin: dājiān
- Wade–Giles: ta-chien

A yunjian, also known as a cloud collar or as a char-qab, is a four- or (more rarely) 8-lobed motif in Chinese art or a four- or multi-lobed accessory in Hanfu, the traditional clothing of the Han Chinese, typically found in the form of a detachable collar with cloud patterns. It is worn over the shoulders, similar to a shawl. The yunjian could also be applied directly on garments, where it would fall around the collar of robes onto the chest and shoulder region,or as a clothing appliqué. In China, the yunjian has both ceremonial and practical uses when used in clothing. As a garment item, the yunjian was an important clothing element for Chinese women, especially in the Ming and Qing dynasties; its usage was spread across China where it became associated with the Han wedding clothing. In Henan, brides would wear yunjian decorated with hanging ribbons and bells. It also had the practical use of preventing clothing from being dirty and oily by covering up the clothes and by covering up the stains. The yunjian is used in Peranakan wedding; the multi-layered yunjian worn by Han brides on the day of their wedding is sometimes known as a phoenix collar. The yunjian also started to be worn by non-Han minorities and neighbors such as the Manchus during the late medieval period.

The yunjian motif was also used in Chinese ceramic work around the necks of vases and jars; mainly in the ceramics of the Yuan, Ming, and Qing dynasty period. It was used to decorate blue and white porcelain.

== Terminology ==
The cloud collar is named after the shape of the collar's lobes, which looks like a 'quadruple-cloud' in design when laid flat.

== Cultural significance and symbolism ==
=== Chinese cosmology ===
The yunjian motif was originally used as a cosmic symbol in China.

=== In Chinese clothing ===
When used on Chinese clothing, the cloud shape is a symbolism which represent abundance while the neck opening is a symbolism for the "Sky gate" (i.e. the entrance to heaven). The lobes which point in 4-directions (typically) represents the universe.

In the Song dynasty, the human body was perceived as the "axis column of the universe" and was considered an extension from the earth to the sky since the post-Han dynasty period while a robe was considered as the "enveloping canopy of the Universe" which is the sky. The hole around at the neck of the sky-resembling robe may be been perceived as a symbolism of the "Sky gate" through which the axis column (i.e. the human body) is believed to penetrate through the "Sky gate".

In Qing dynasty, this cosmological concept was maintained and could be seen in the cloud-studded upper part of the clothing, especially on the dragon robes. On the dragon robes, the yunjian represented the sky which was supported on the world; the world was represented by the motifs of mountains and seas which were decorating the base of the dragon robe.

In the recent centuries, the yunjian motif has been mainly perceived as a purely decorative motif. In the late Ming and Qing dynasties, the cosmological was largely forgotten as the people became more materialistic, and by then, the yunjian motif became mainly an ornamental design. When the lobes of the yunjian were no longer perceived as representing the 4-directions, the number of lobes started to vary. The number of lobes were sometimes 3, 5, 6, 8 instead of the traditional use of the 4-lobes.

== Origins ==
The origins of the yunjian appears to have been derived from multiple origins. There are also several hypotheses on their origins.

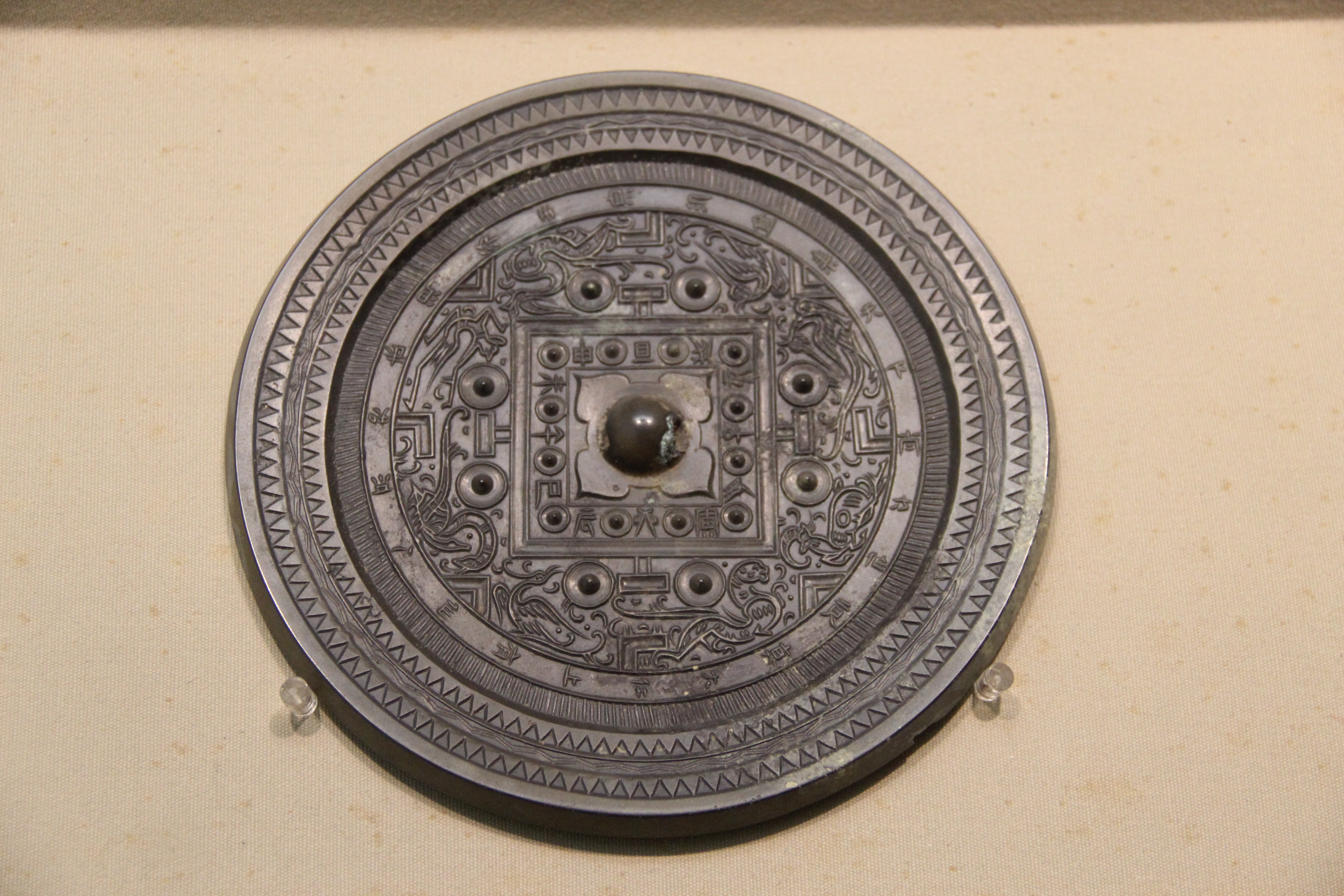
Yunjian motif found on a Han dynasty bronze mirror.

According to Schuyler Cammann, the origins of yunjian motif is derived from the cosmological decorations which ornated the back of mirrors of the Han dynasty. The earliest forms of the yunjian motif appeared on the Chinese bronze mirrors found at the end of the Zhou dynasty (c. 4th and 3rd centuries BC). However, the Zhou dynasty yunjian motif was not fully evolved; it was only during the Eastern Han dynasty (c. 1st century AD) that the yunjian motif evolved fully.

The yunjian motif may also have been derived from persimmon calyx pattern, which may have been called fenghua pattern, a flower pattern with 4 petals with each petal showing a different direction) used in lacquer and bronze wares of the Han dynasty. The persimmon calyx pattern originated in the Warring States Period and prevailed in the Han dynasty. The yunjian motif appears to have later been adapted to develop the actual garment collar.

== Garment collar ==
=== Sui and Tang dynasties ===
The yunjian as a form of garment collar was developed in the Sui dynasty from a feather coat. Other sources indicate however that it first appeared in the Tang dynasty and was an element of the Chinese court dress since Tang dynasty. In the Tang dynasty, the pattern of 4-petal leaf which was used in the yunjian motif changed in details and became a cross flower and thus developed in the usual pattern which would decorate on fabrics.

=== Song and Jin dynasties ===
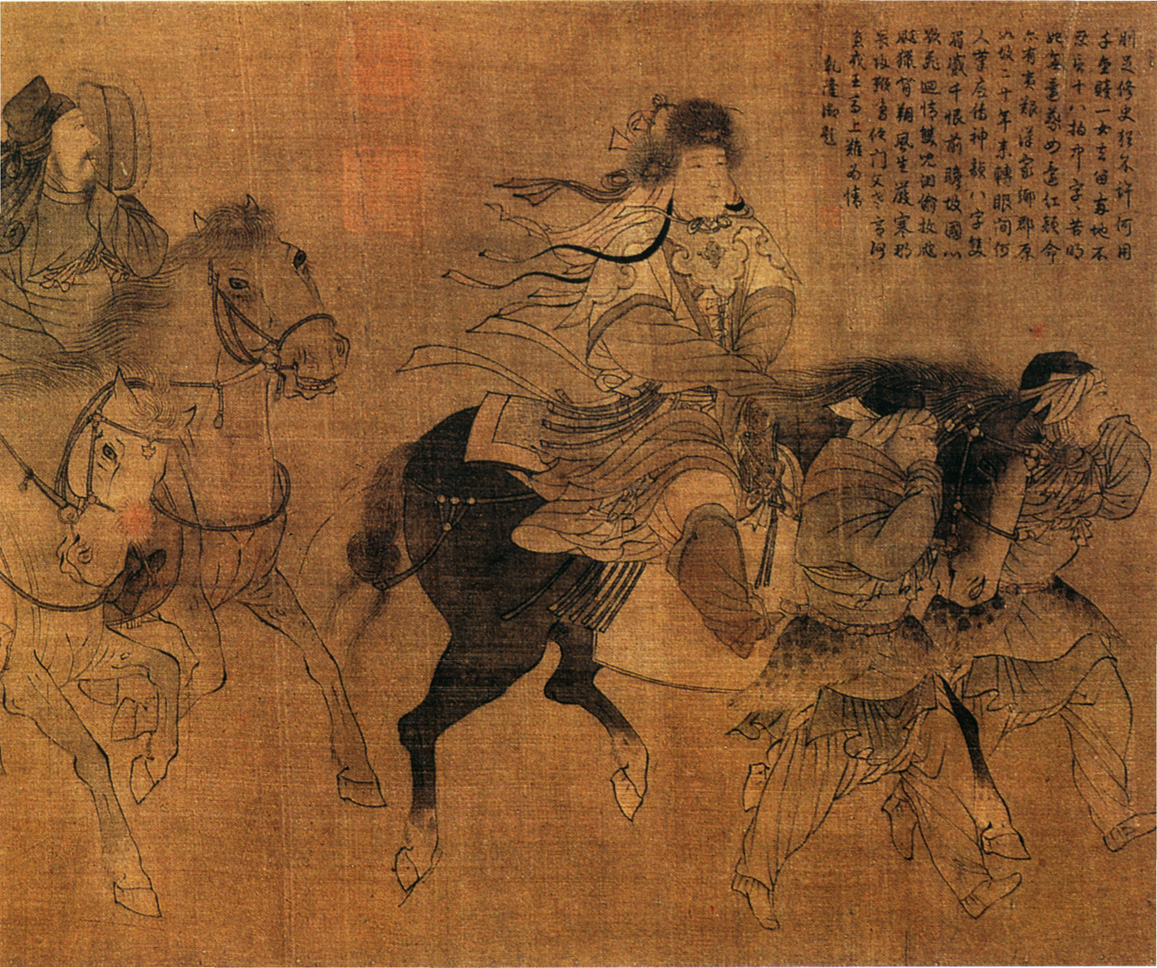
Cai Wenji returning to Han, Jin dynasty painting.

The yunjian appears to have already been known in China as early as the Song dynasty and since then, they have used extensively in their robes patterns. Till the Song dynasty, the design of the yunjian shows the combination of persimmon calyx motif and the ruyi clouds (auspicious clouds); this was also used in architecture of the Song dynasty. The ruyi clouds patterns can be found as early as in the bronze wares of the Shang and Zhou dynasties and they became popular in the Han dynasty.

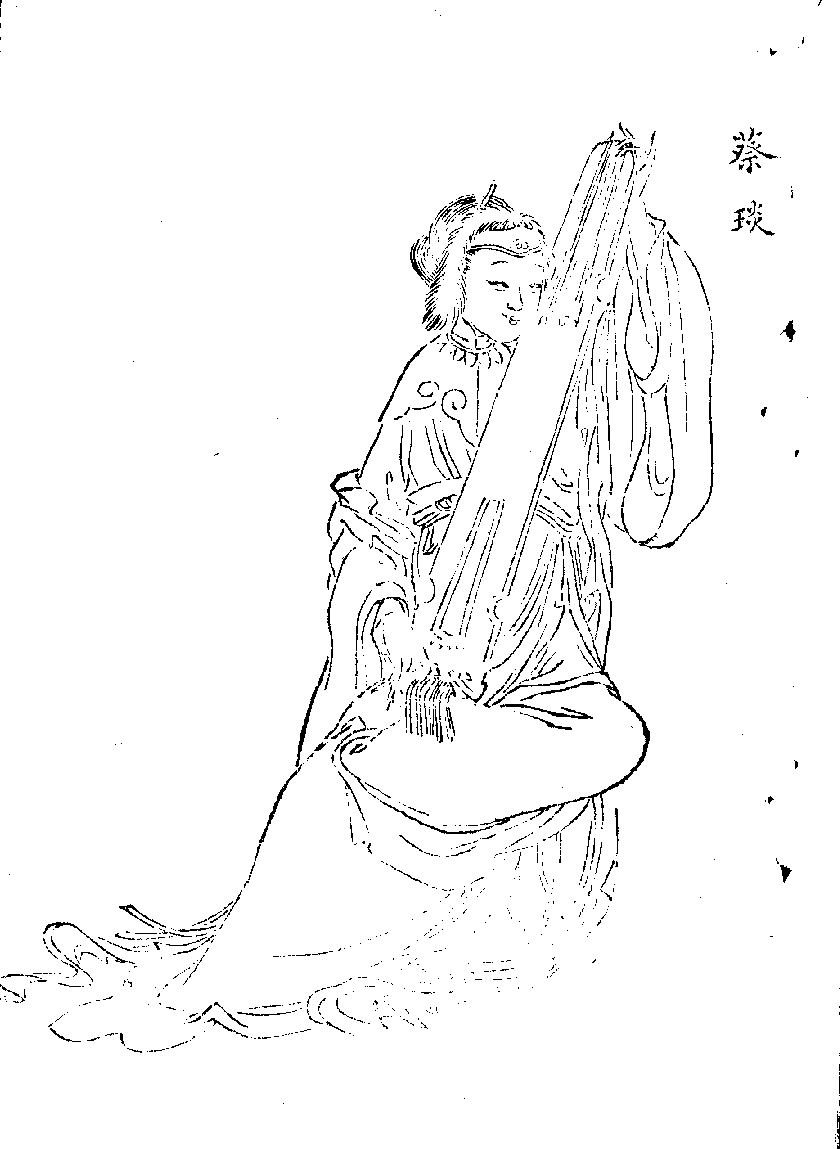
Cai Wenji, Qing dynasty illustration.

The yunjian also had origins in the Jin dynasty, where it is attested that it was first used on robes in literature. The first pictorial evidence of the yunjian pattern usage on robes is from the Jin dynasty in the painting Lady Wenji Returns to Han while the term "yunjian" (雲肩) was also first document in the Jin shi in the description of the Jin dynasty imperial dress. According to the Jinshi: "Titled and royal lady and imperial relatives ... granted imperial carriage and dressings for carriage with sun and moon decorated on left and right of cloud shoulders, dragon pattern in yellow, saddle with five holes need to be changed”. The imperial dress was also described to be yellow imperial robe decorated with dragon motifs which is worn with a yunjian decorated with the sun and moon.

=== Mongol period and Yuan dynasty ===
Prior to the conquest of the Song dynasty, the Mongols had already adopted the wearing of yunjian motifs. However, according to the History of Yuan, the clothing system of the Yuan originated from the Jin dynasty; "when the Yuan dynasty was founded, clothing and carriage decorations followed the old customs. Kublai Khan took the customs from the Jin and Song dynasty to the Han and Tang dynasty".

The yunjian motif was popular in the Yuan dynasty and became a signature motif on both men's and women's clothing and could also be found on both ceramic and metal work. In the Yuan dynasty painting Khubilai Khan Hunting, Empress Chabi is depicted wearing a white robe which is decorated with a cloud-collar motif on her chest and shoulders. Some of the attendant also wore Mongol robes with the yunjian motif. The Yuan dynasty yunjian pattern consisted of a 4-lobed cruciform-shaped design and would be found around the robe's collar covering the chest and shoulders areas. The Yuan dynasty yunjian motif was the combination of ruyi-clouds, persimmon calyx motif and bo, which was used to protect the necks of northern nomads from winds and sand; this also developed into the yunjian pattern which was used to decorate the shoulder region of clothing and became widely used in the clothing of nobles. In the Medieval periods, the yunjian motif appears to have been derived from the eight-petal lotus and the Buddhist Mandala. The yunjian no more appeared on the official robes after the fall of the Yuan dynasty in China proper.

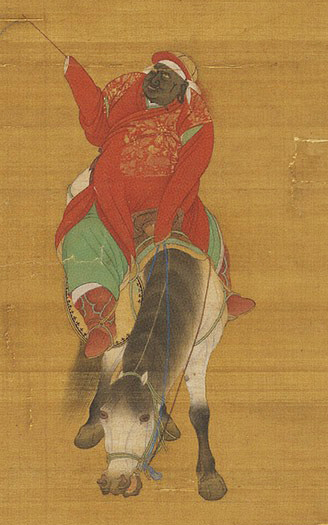
Male attendant wearing a red Mongol robe decorated with yuanjian motif; Yuan dynasty.

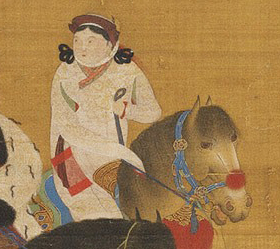
Empress Chabi wearing a Mongol robe with a cloud collar motif, Yuan dynasty

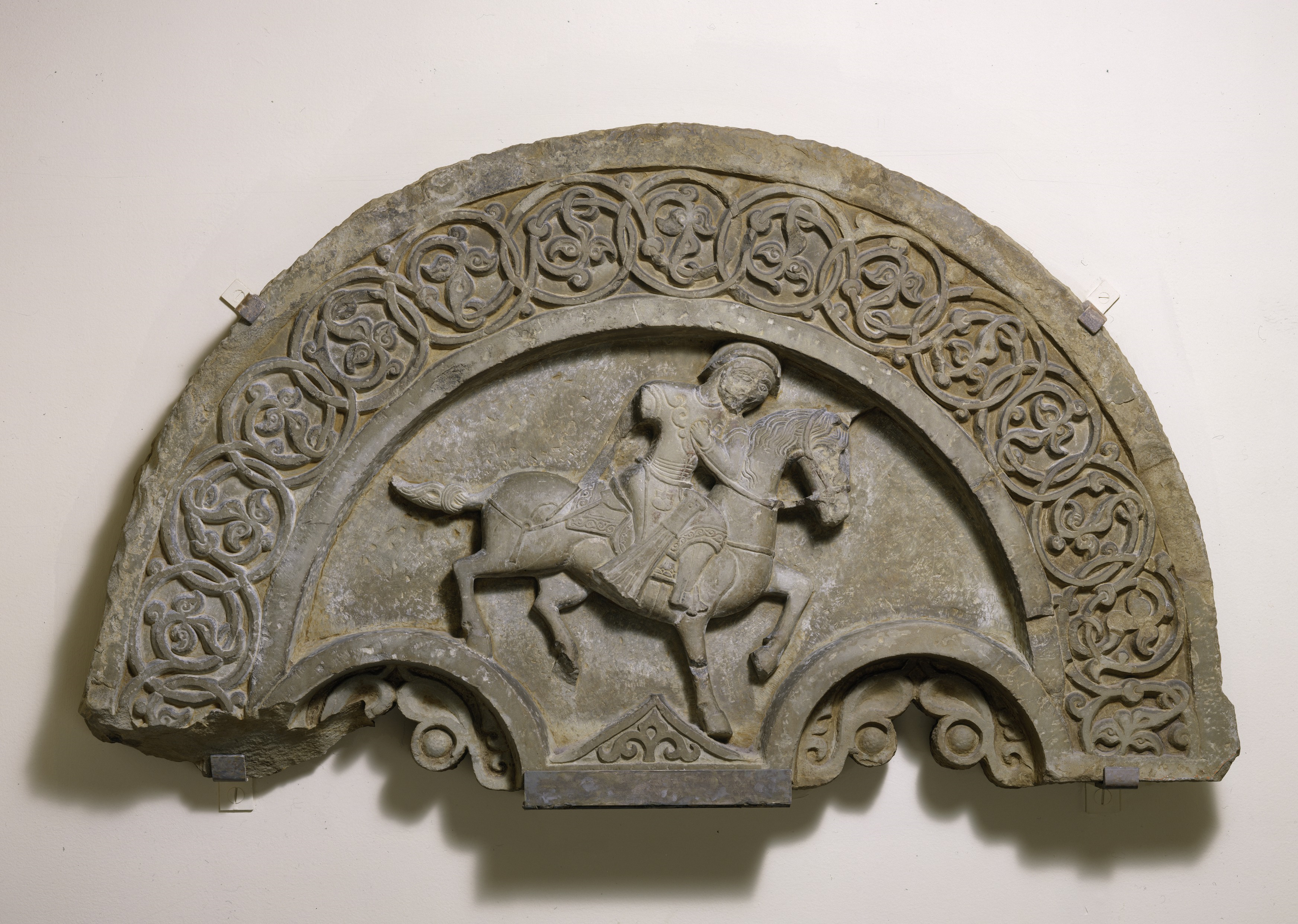
Mongol horserider with "cloud collar", House of Ahmad and Ibrahim, Kubachi in the Caucasus, second half 14th century CE

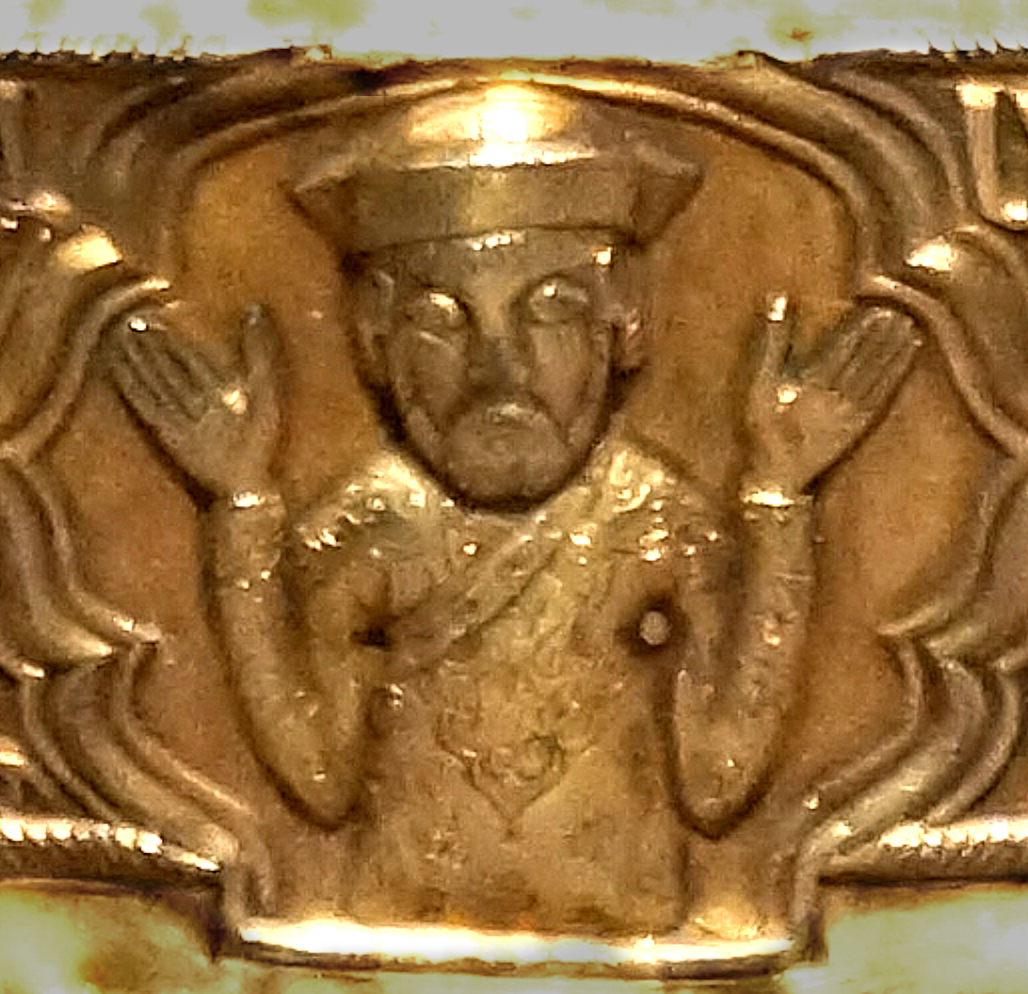
Armenian Prince Eacchi Proshian on a reliquary circa 1300. He is wearing a Mongol-style dress (cloud collar).

=== Ming dynasty ===
A lady wearing yunjian, Ming dynasty illustration.

In Ming dynasty, the yunjian garment collar appears to have been popular in both China and Mongolia in this period. The Ming court once sent a yunjian with the design of gold-brocaded tiger and flower to a Mongolian chieftain. The 4-lobed cloud collar continued to be work around the collars of the Ming dynasty ceremonial robe.

=== Qing dynasty ===
The yunjian survived into the Qing dynasty period and was used in Chinese women's clothing. It became very popular and it could be found many forms and styles.

In the 17th and 18th century AD, the yunjian was one of the most common Han Chinese women fashion in China, along with ruqun, taozi (绦子; i.e. a ribbon around the arm), beizi and bijia. The yunjian could be sometimes be used as a detachable collar or could be found woven into the women's robe. More often however, the yunjian was found on the women's robe as an appliqué. The practical use and the ceremonial associations of the yunjian may have contributed to the use of yunjian appliqué on the ao or shan (i.e. a type of Chinese jackets) in the 19th century.

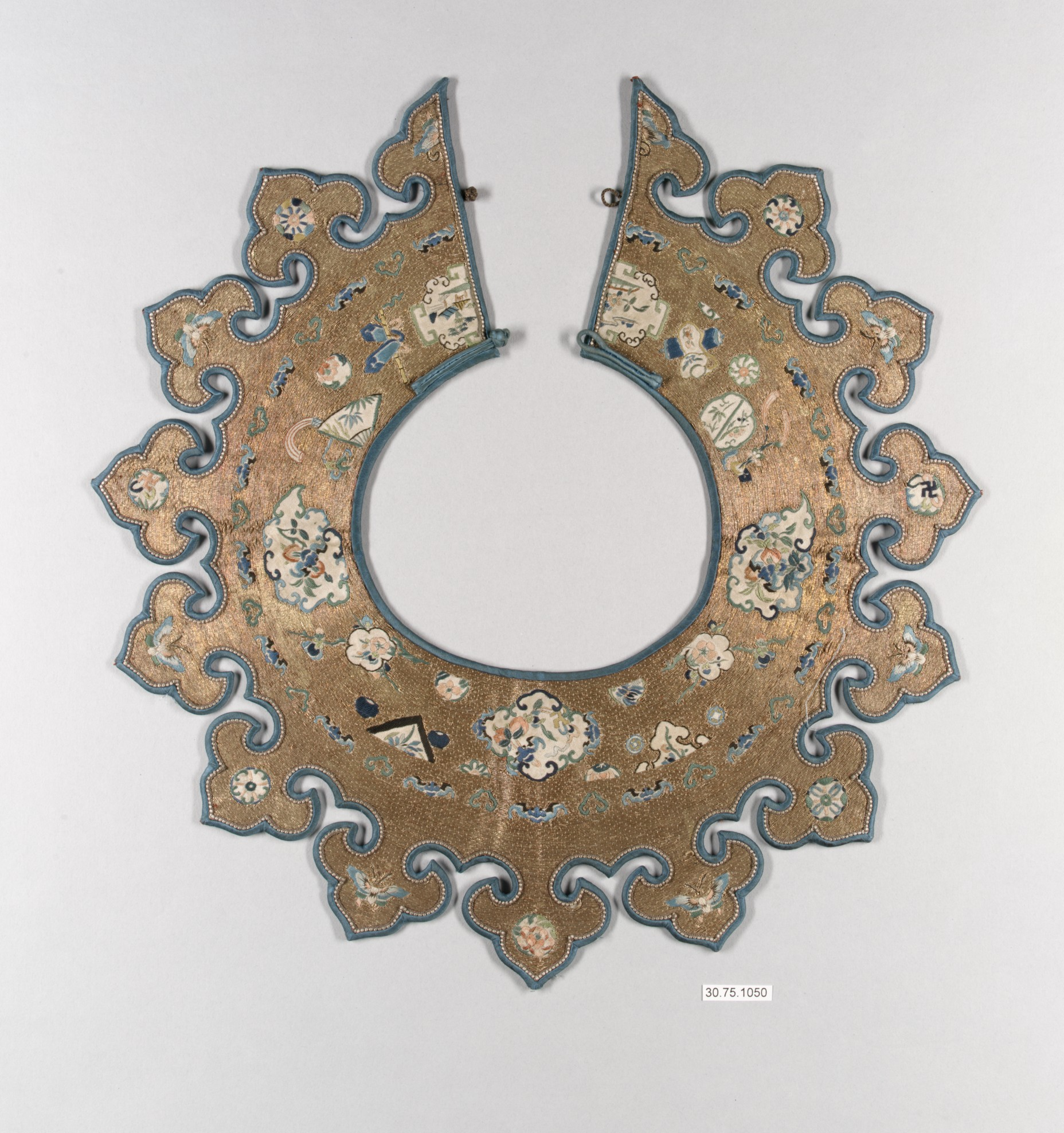
Qing dynasty cloud collar.

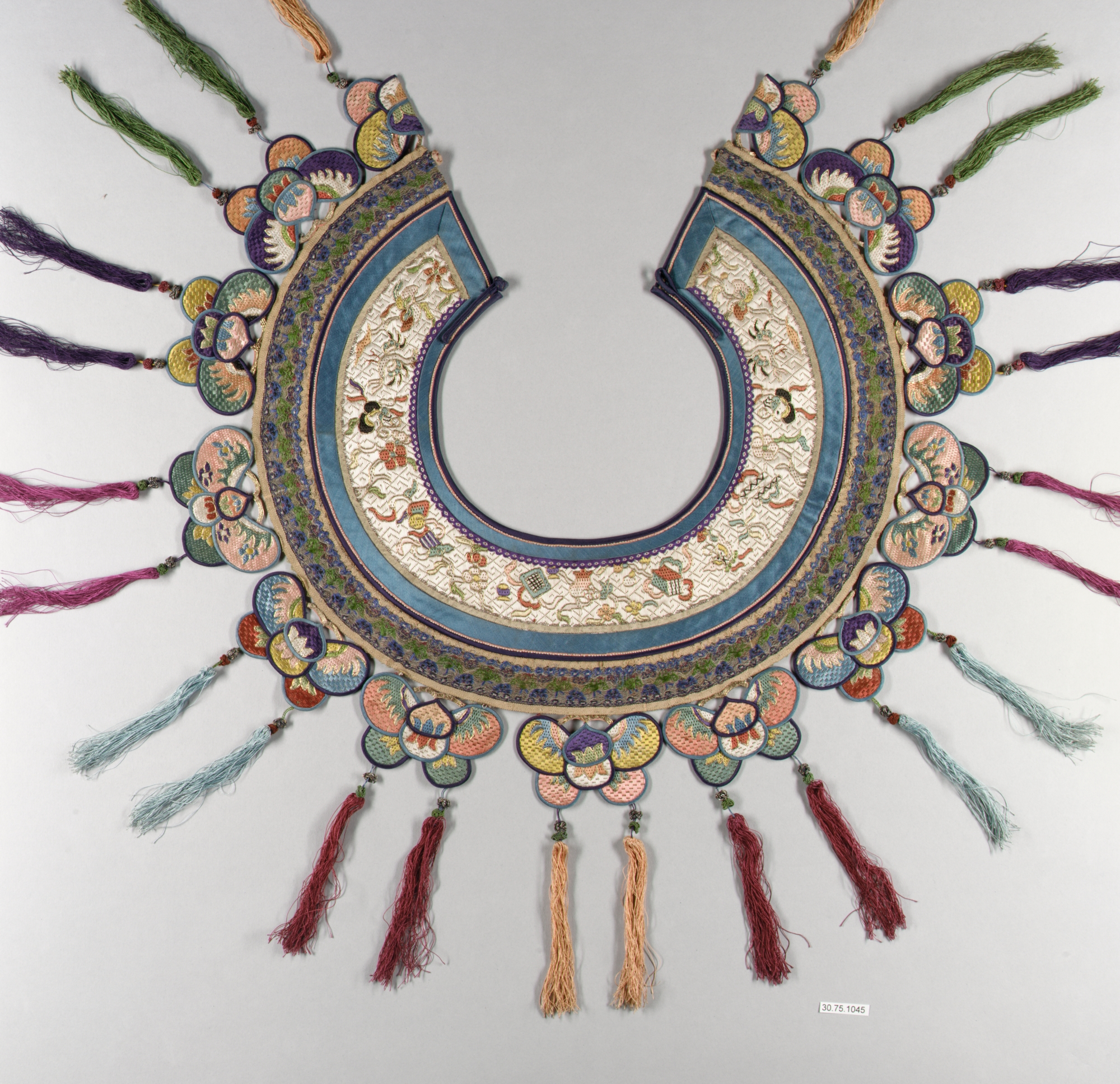
Qing dynasty cloud collar.

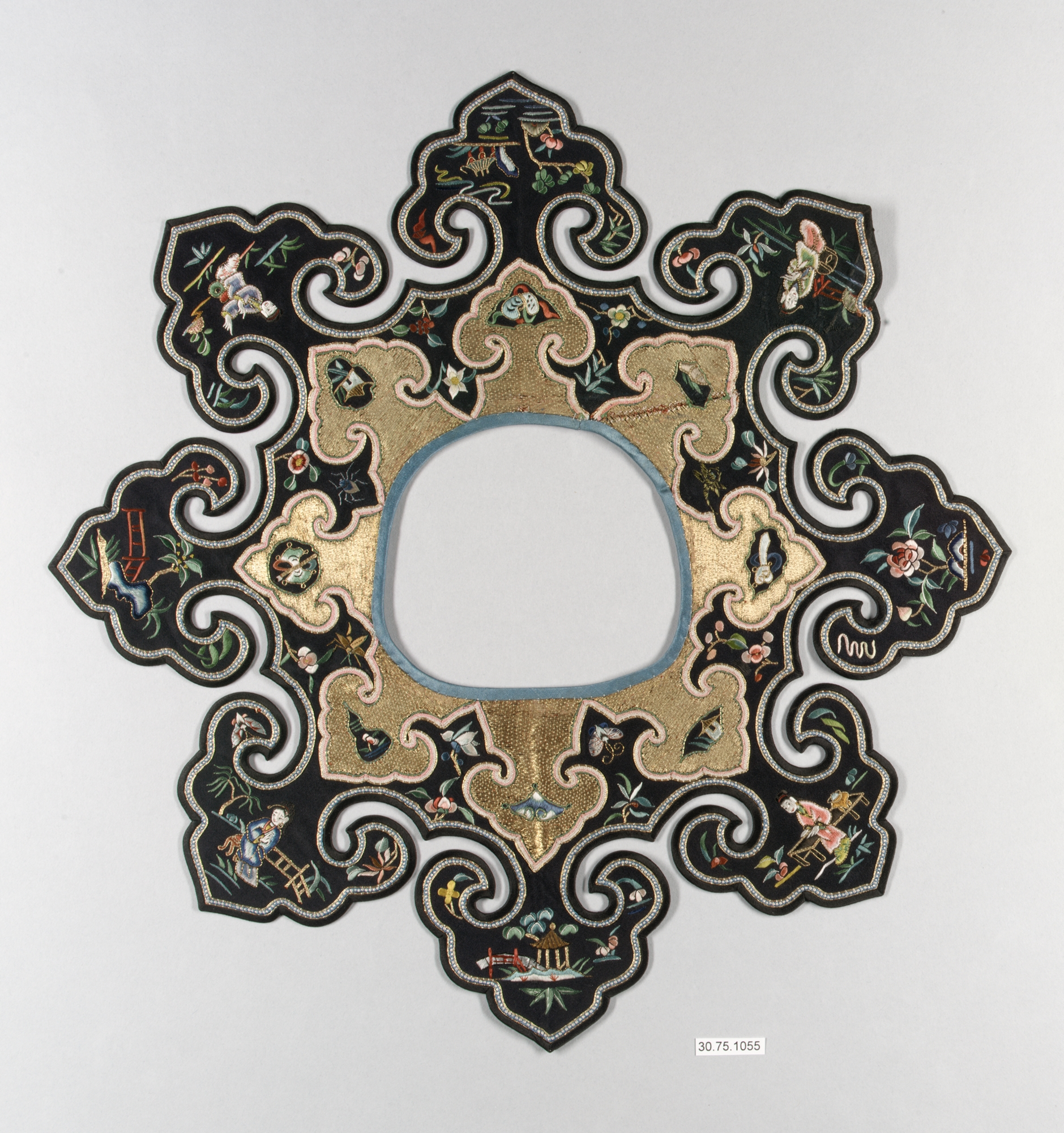
Qing dynasty cloud collar.

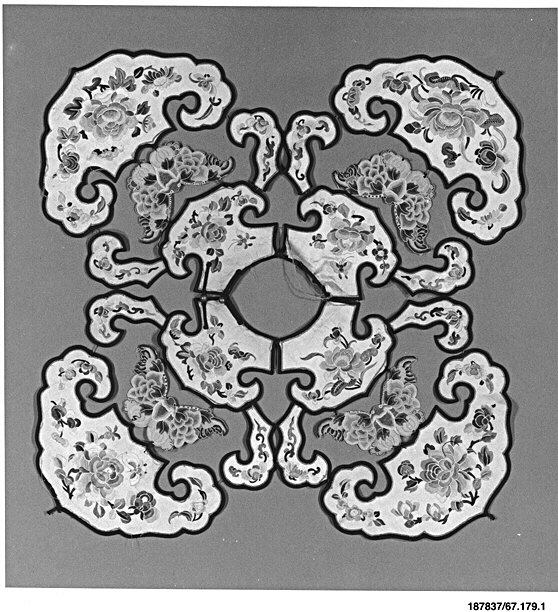
Qing dynasty cloud collar.

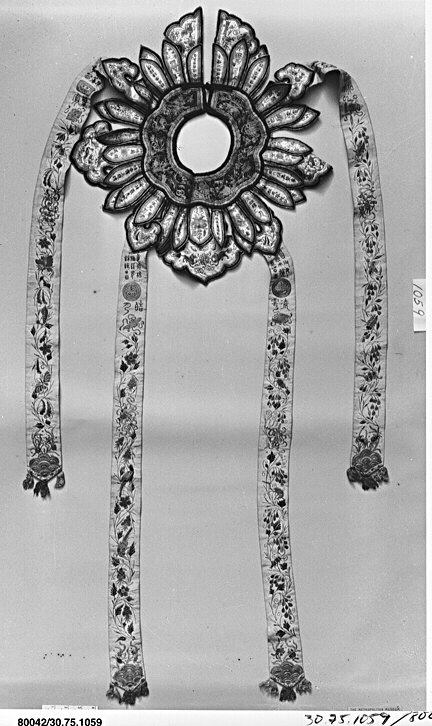
Qing dynasty cloud collar.

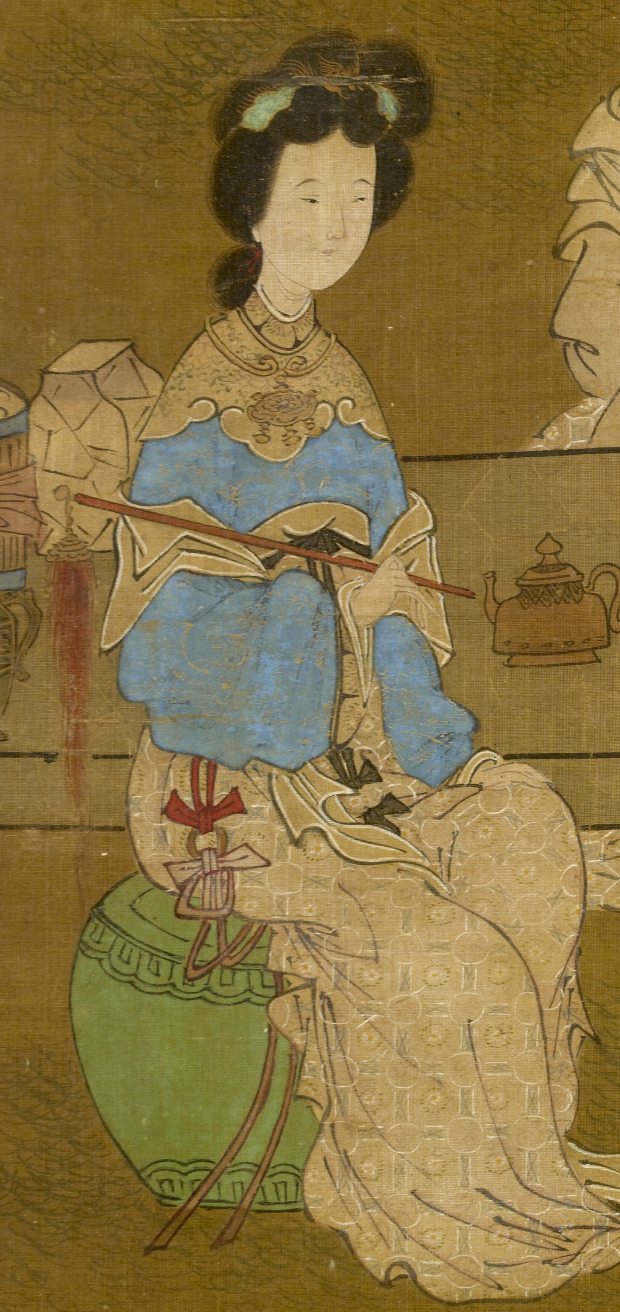
Woman wearing cloud collar in a painting, d. 1700–1825.

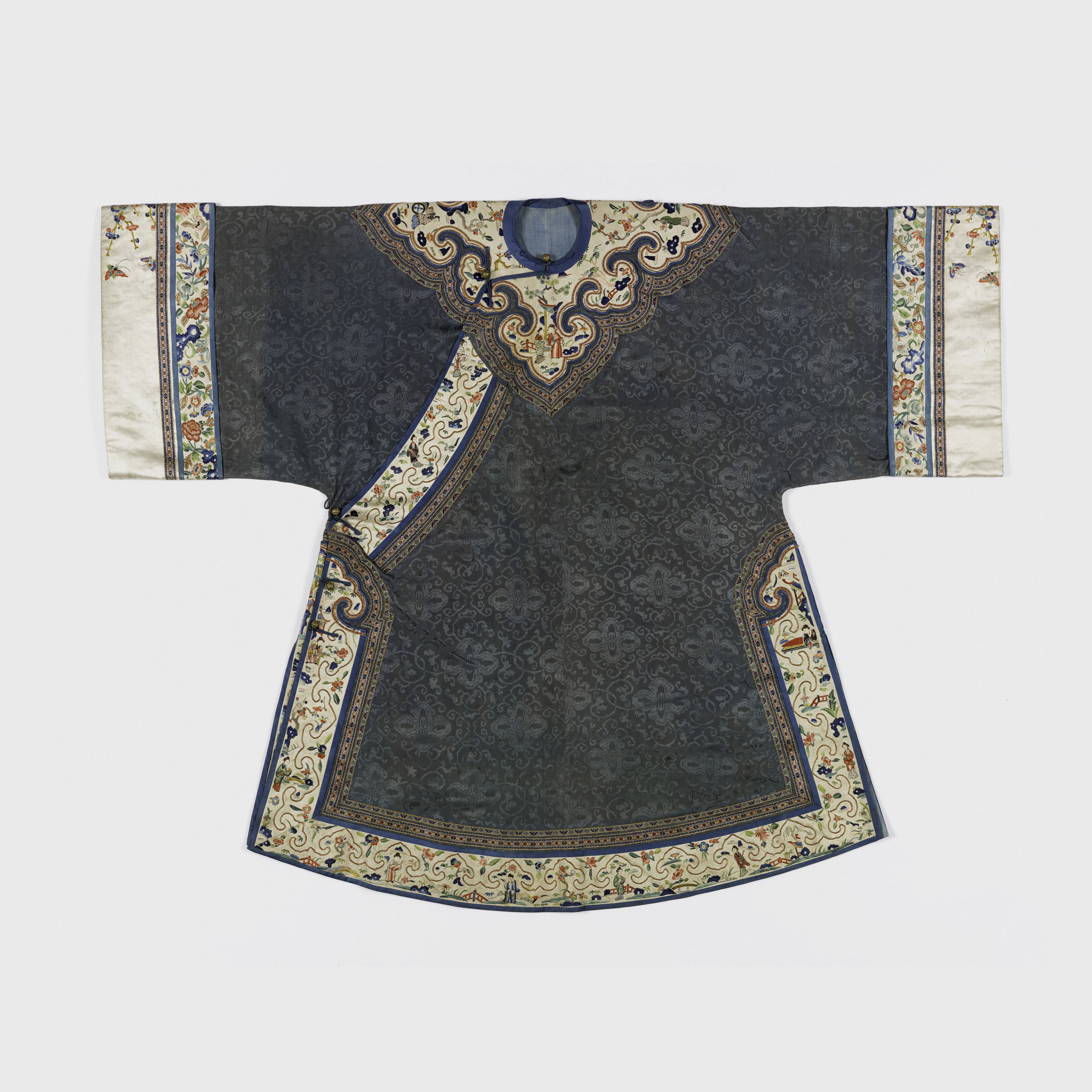
Woman's Short Coat (China) with a cloud collar appliqué, early 19th century (front view).

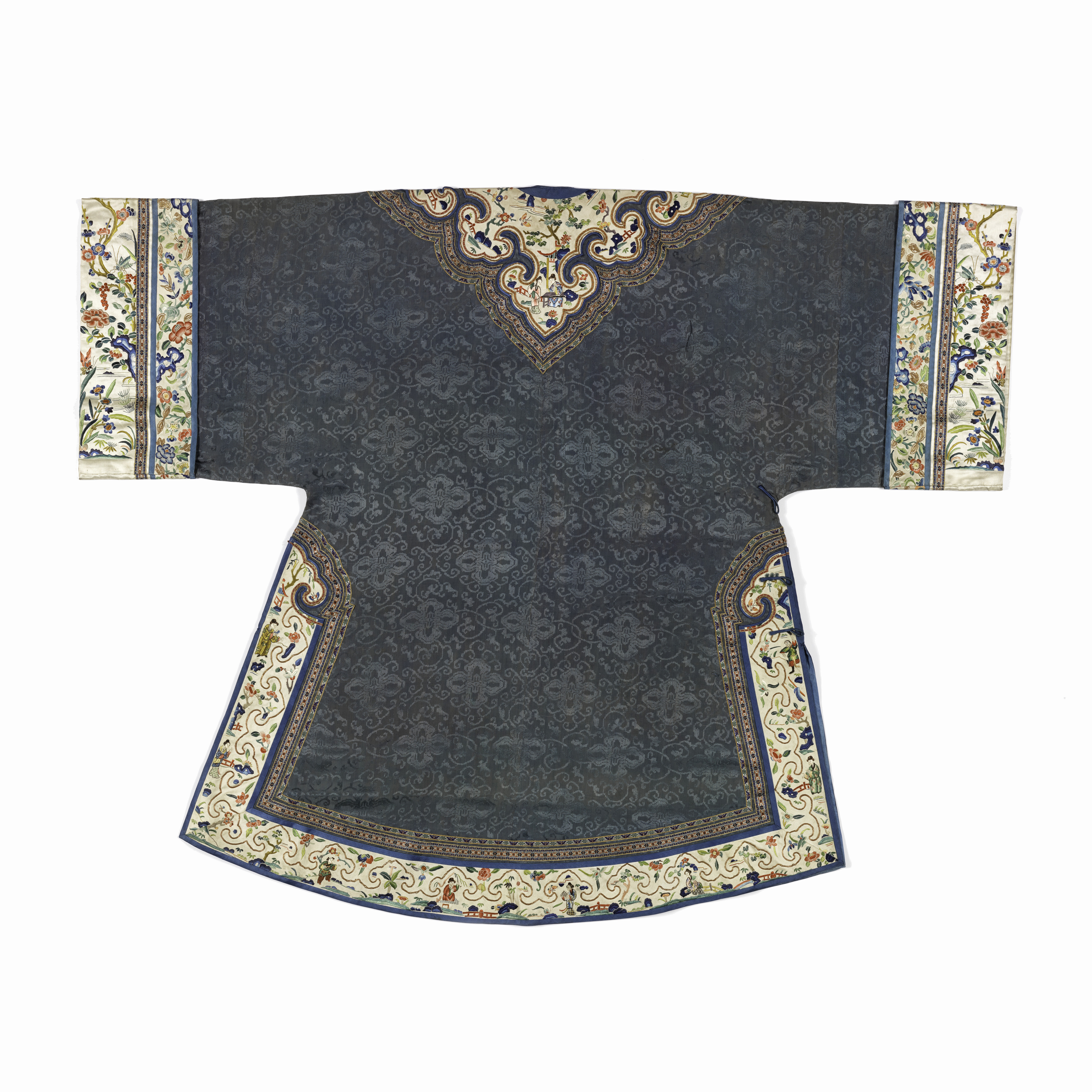
Woman's Short Coat (China) with a cloud collar appliqué, early 19th century (back view).

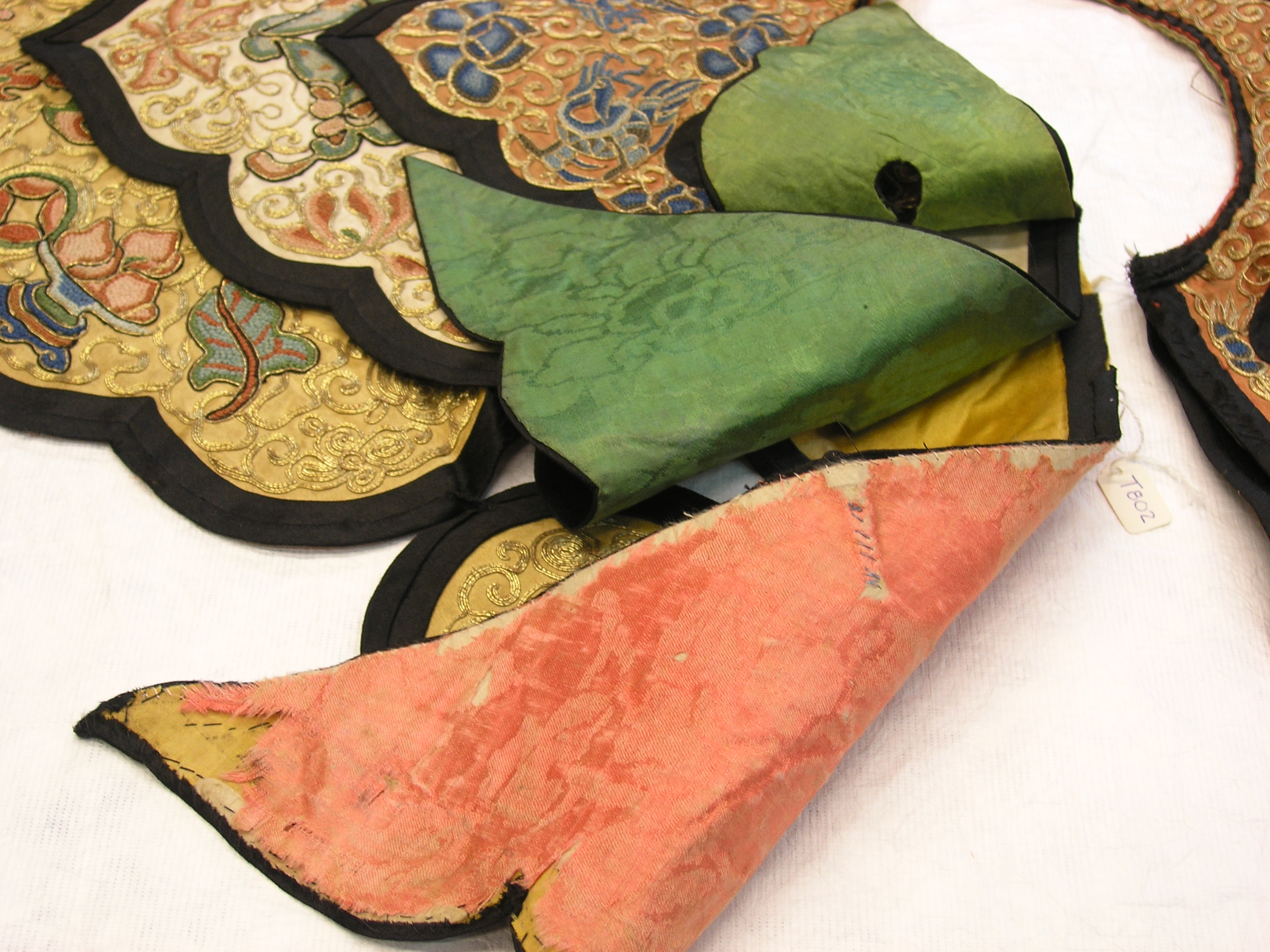
Multi-layered cloud collar (section view).

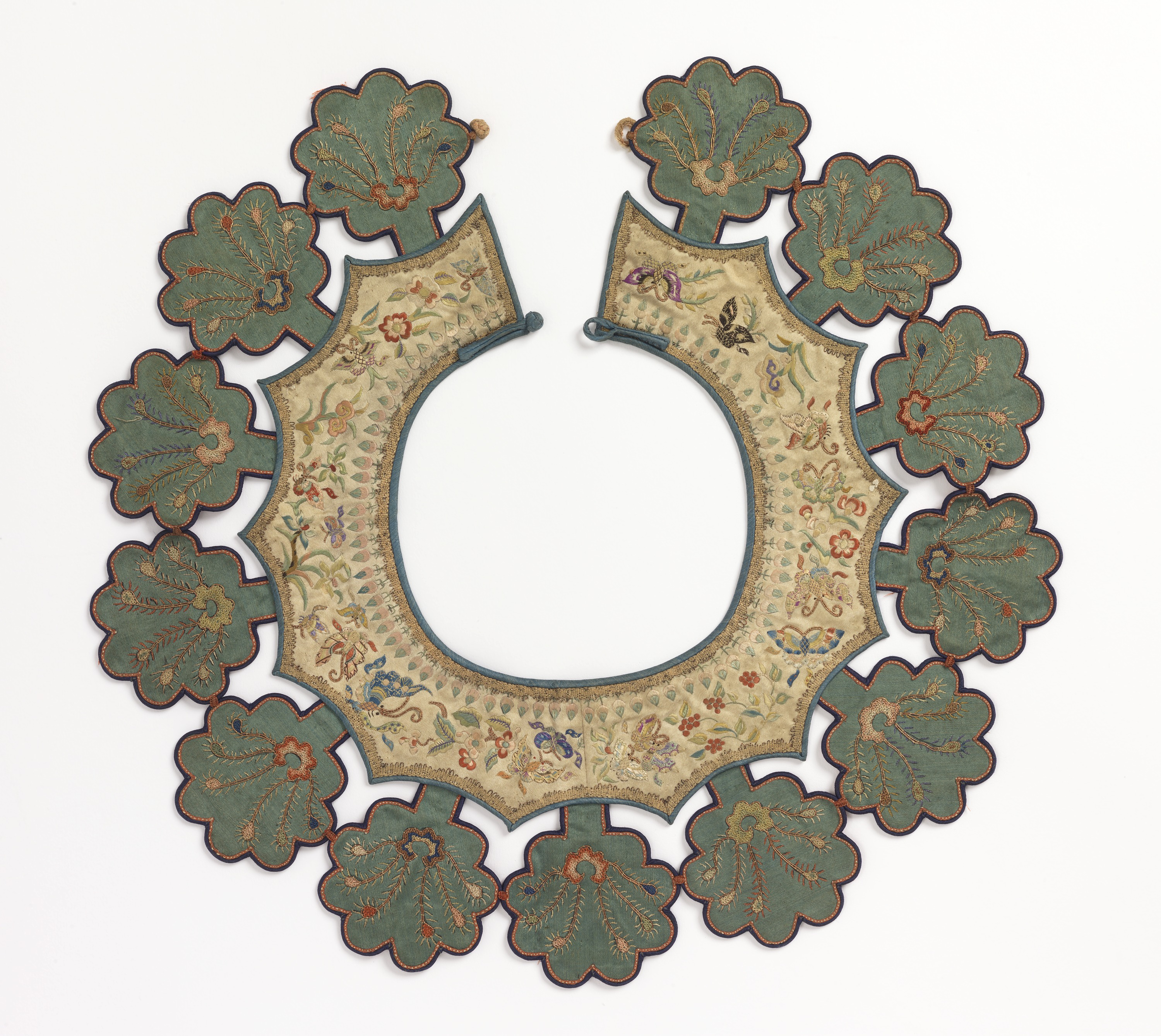
yunjian in 19th century

In Qing, the yunjian became an indispensable item for women's wedding clothing, and by the 19th century, it was an important central element to the Han Chinese women's celebratory clothing. The yunjian worn by the Han Chinese as ceremonial clothing and for wedding was a detachable collar which was worn on top of the mang ao (i.e. the dragon jacket) and the Qing dynasty xiapei (a type of stole).

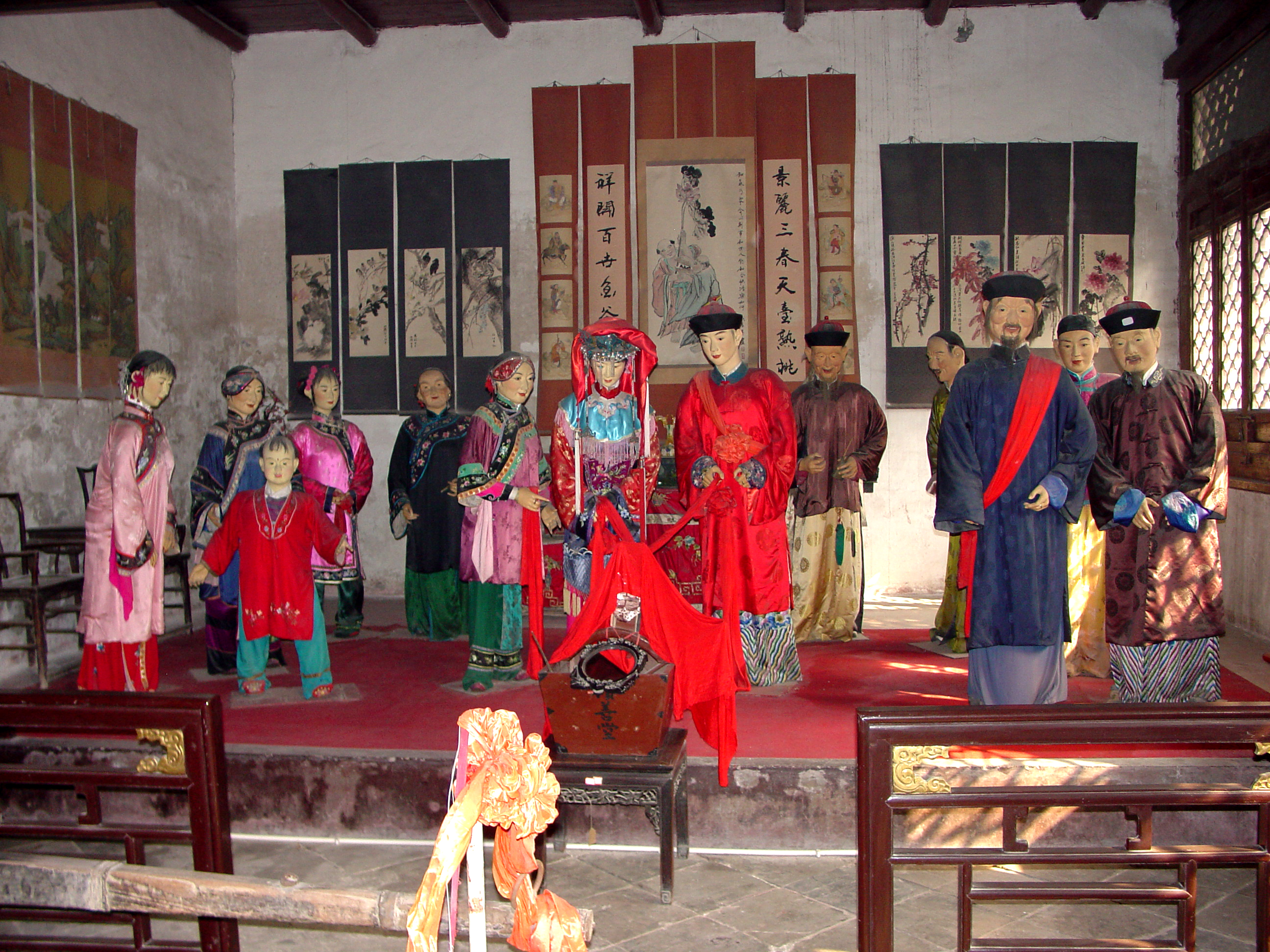
Life-size mannequins enact a traditional Chinese wedding of the 19th century; the bride is wearing a bright blue detachable cloud collar.

=== Republic of China ===
The yunjian continued to appear in the Chinese robes during the Republic of China.

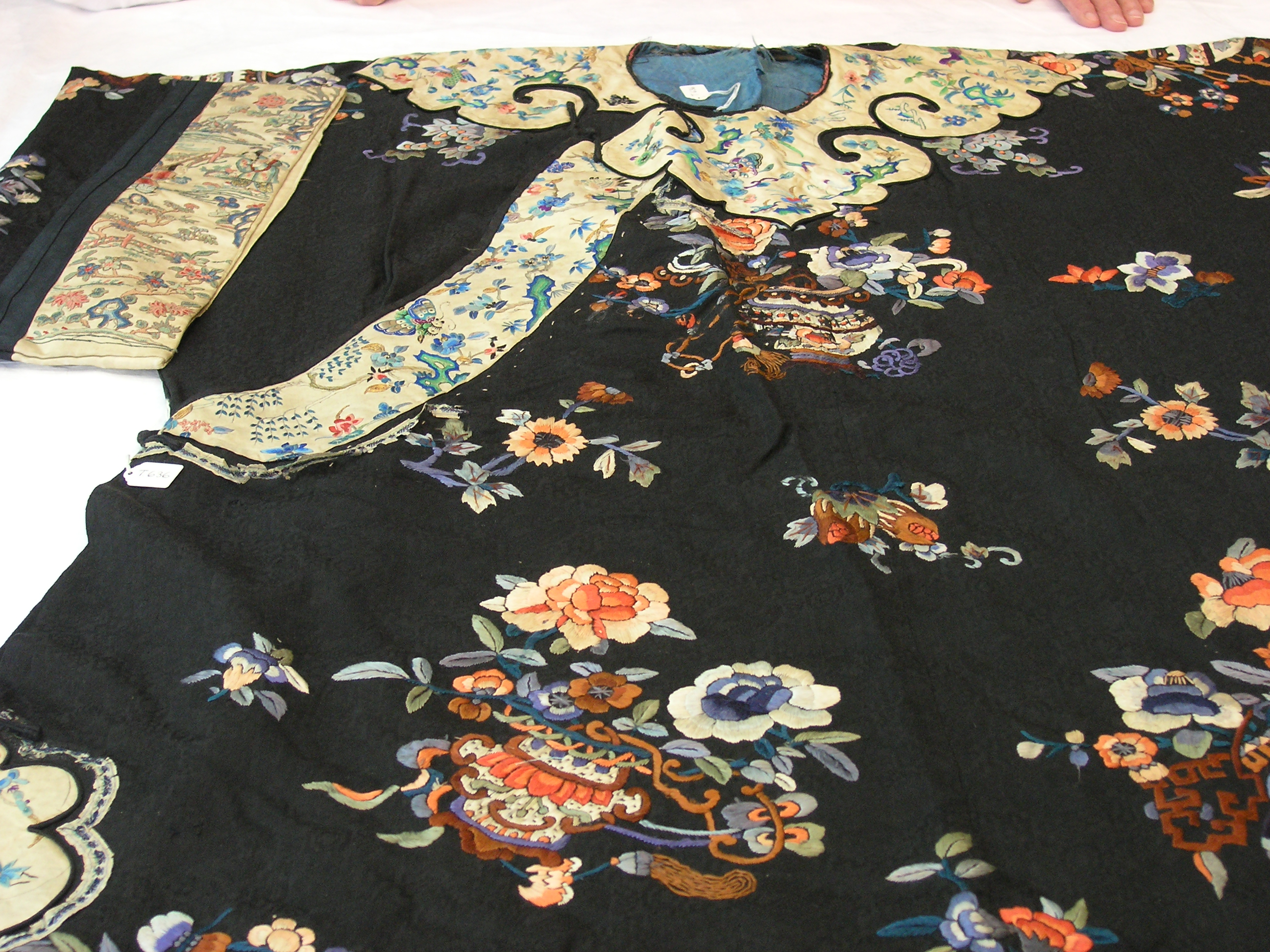
Chinese long robe with cloud collar motif.

== 21st century ==
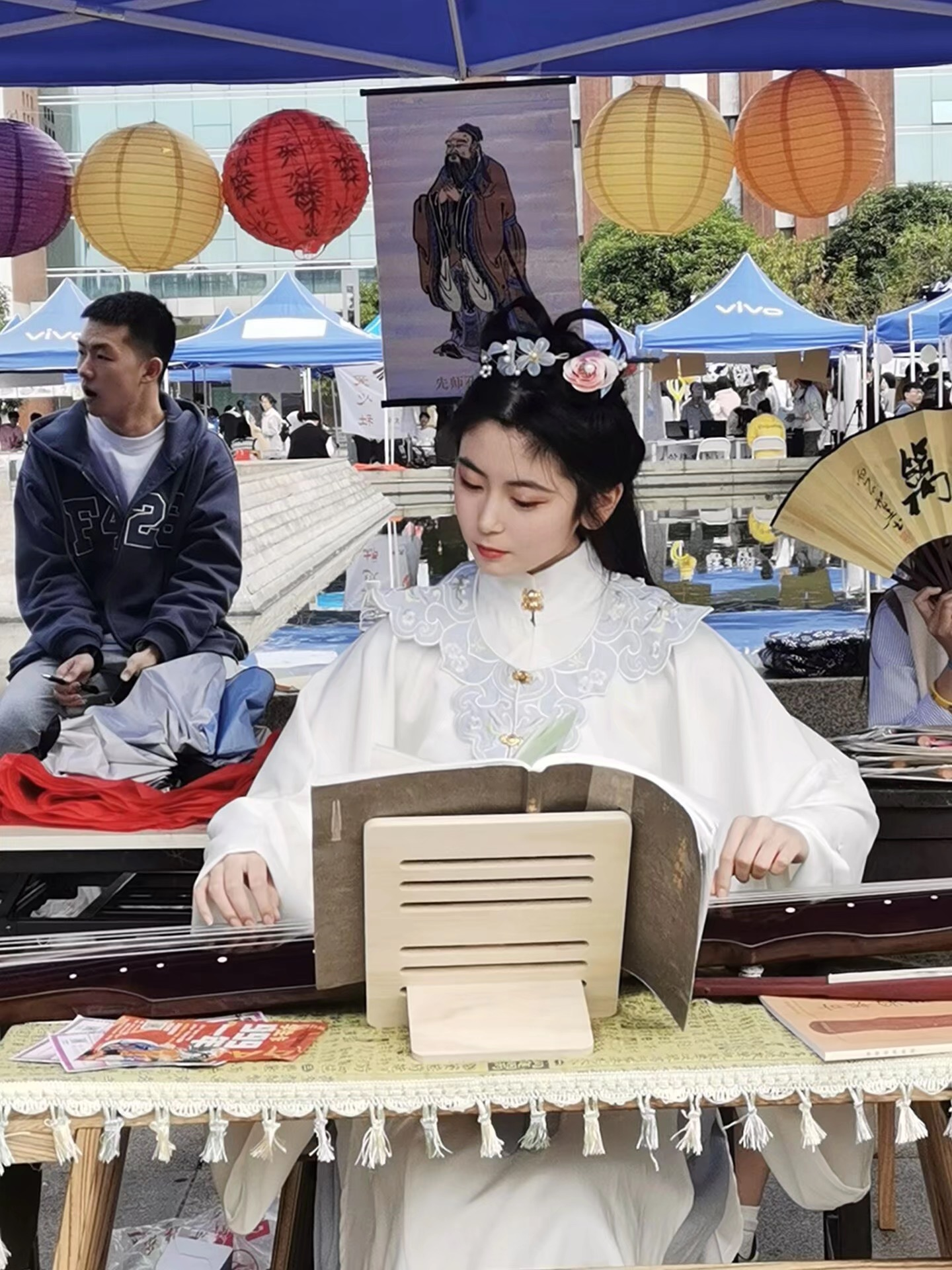
Modern yunjian, 21st century, 2022

In the 21st century, modern yunjian started to be used to ornate the modern hanfu; however, it has gradually lost its original cultural significance.

== Chinese opera costumes ==
The yunjian was also worn in women Chinese opera costumes.

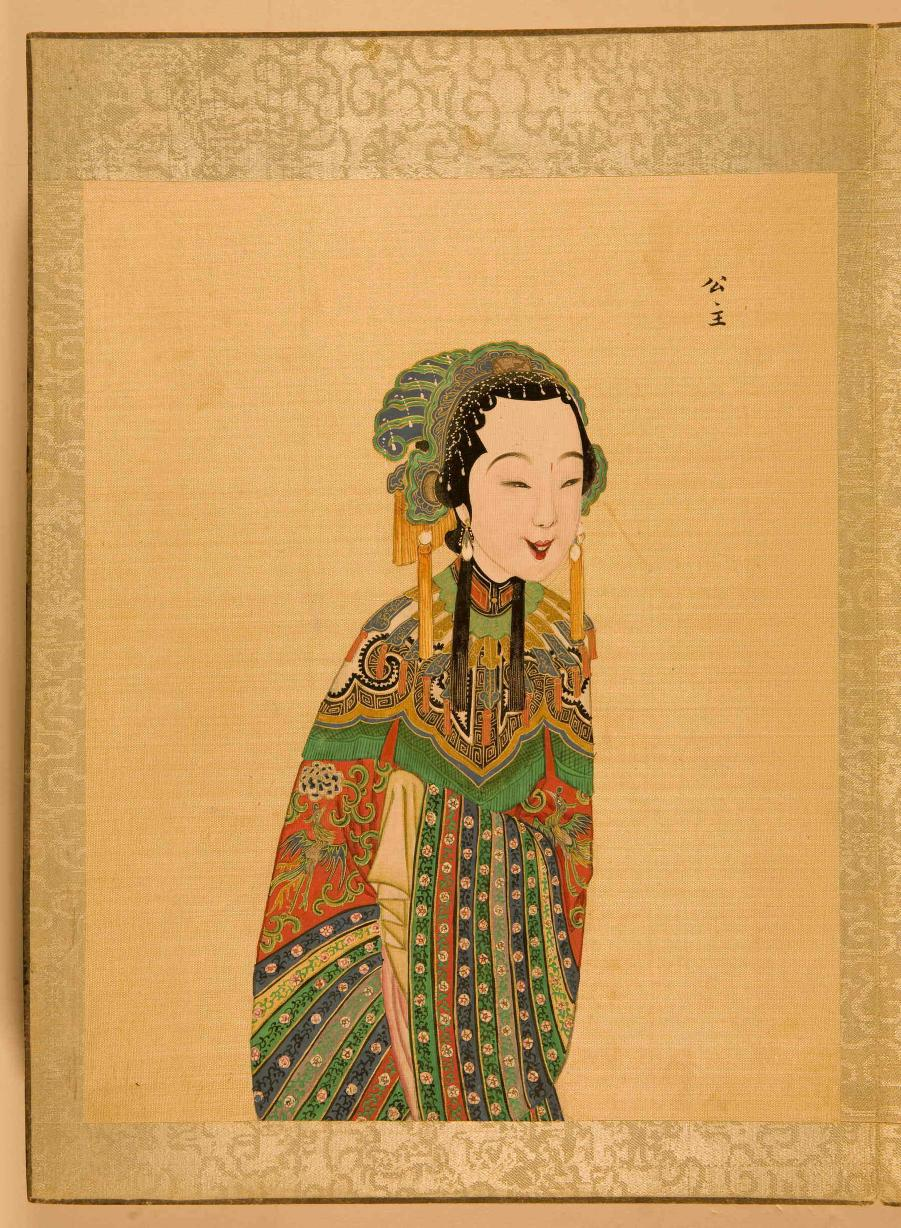
Picture depicting makeup for characters in the Peking opera, Qing dynasty.

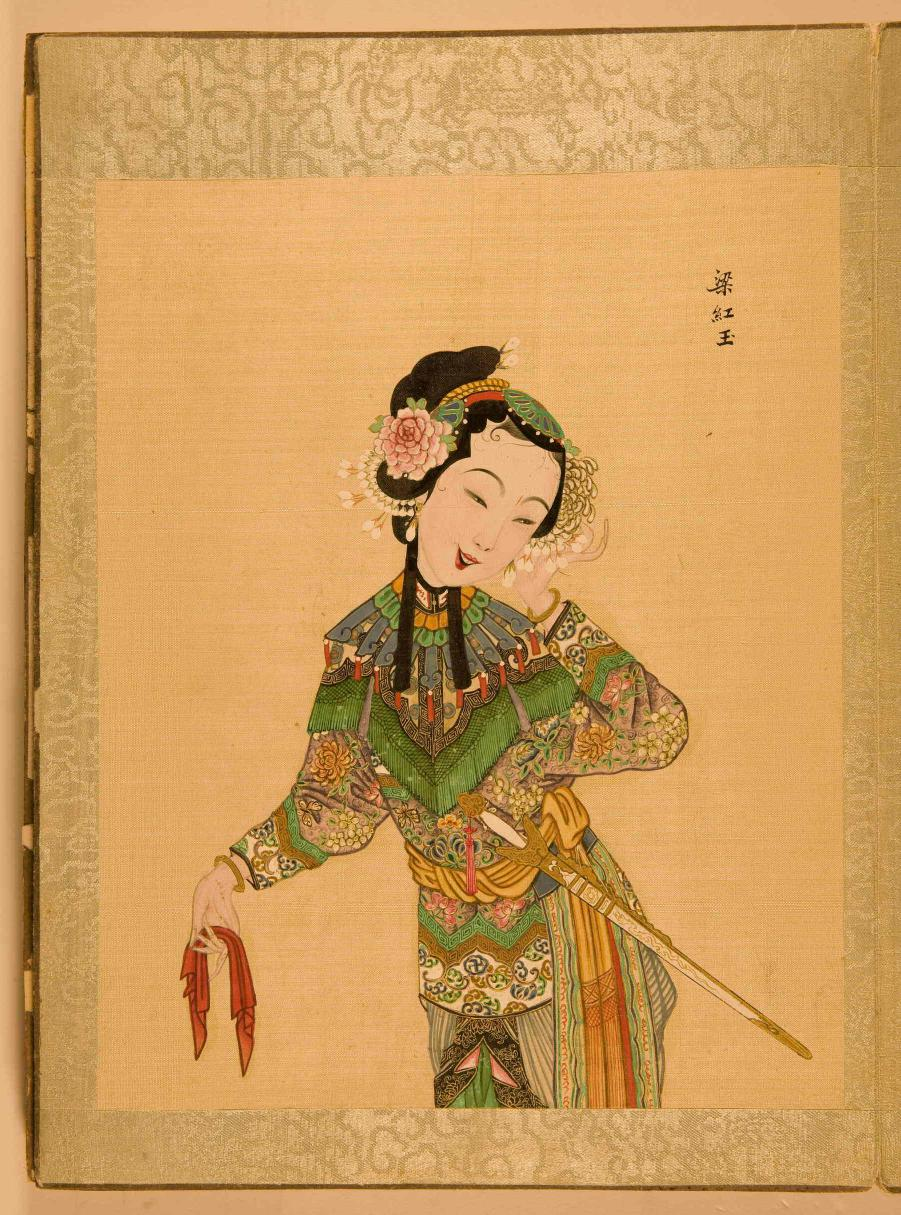
Picture depicting makeup for characters in the Peking opera, Qing dynasty.

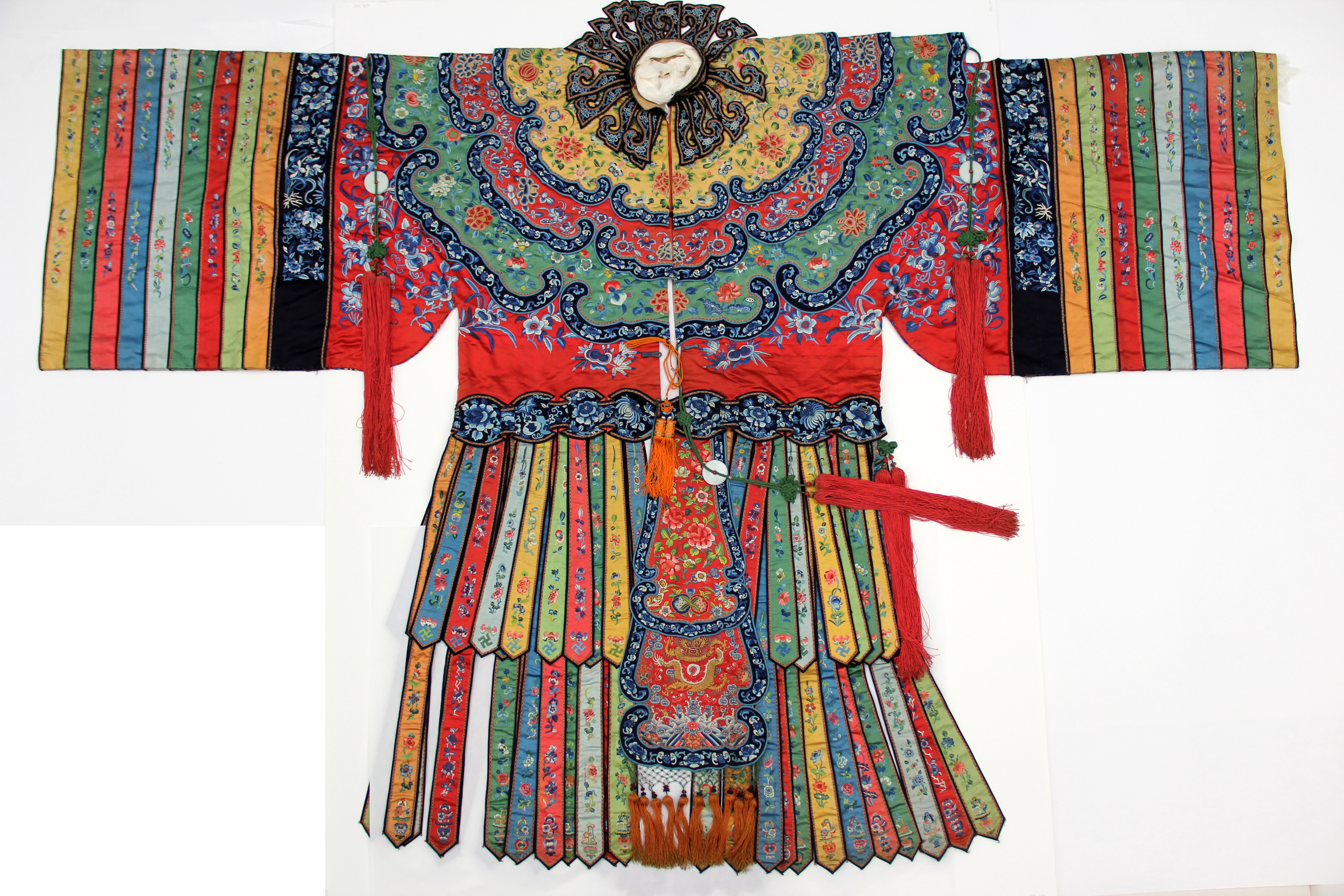
宮衣-Theatrical Robe for the Role of a Princess with a cloud collar motif.

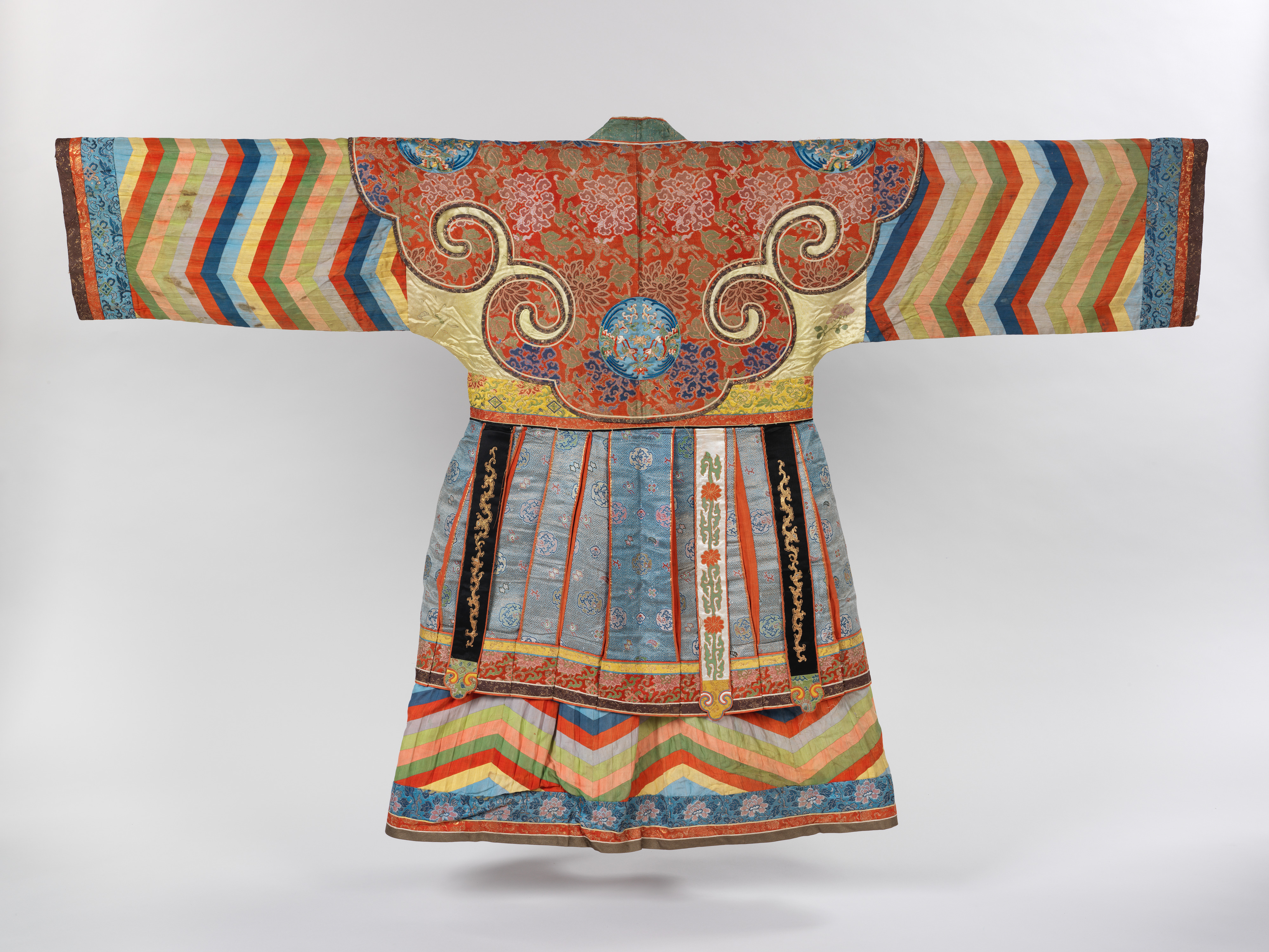
Theatrical Robe with a cloud collar.

== Chinese ceramics ==
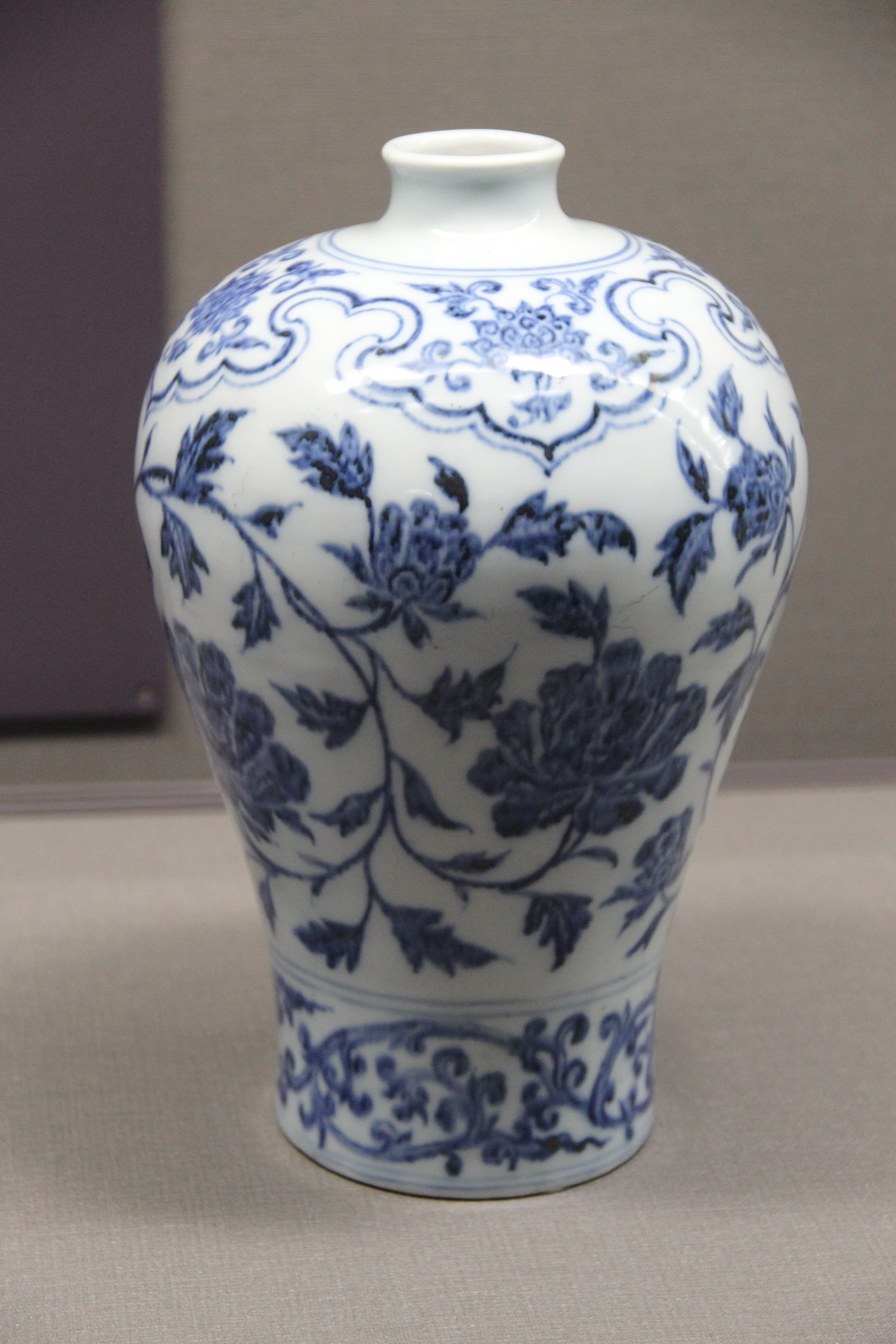
Blue and white Porcelain decorated with yunjian, Ming dynasty.

The use of the cloud collar motif on ceramic works appears to more commonly on the Ming dynasty ceramics although this ceramic design could have already been developed during the Yuan dynasty. The cloud collar motif used around the necks of Chinese jars and vases could have been derived from the cloud collar (clothing item) or may have been developed independently from the actual collar as the jars and vases were themselves perceived as a miniature version of the universe. In ceramics, the yunjian motif could also appear in the form of a ruyi-head border, which was derived from the head of the lingzhi, a sacred fungus for the Chinese people.

== Influences and derivatives ==
=== Clothing ===
==== Islamic Cultural sphere ====
During the Mongol invasion of Eurasia, the Mongols brought new artistic concepts to the Islamic cultural sphere, including Persia, and in Central Asia. It continued to appears in the arts of the Timurid (1370–1507) and Safavid (1501–1736) period.

In manuscript paintings of the Ilkhanate (1256–1335), the yunjian, which were one of the distinctive Mongol fashion accessories, is depicted.

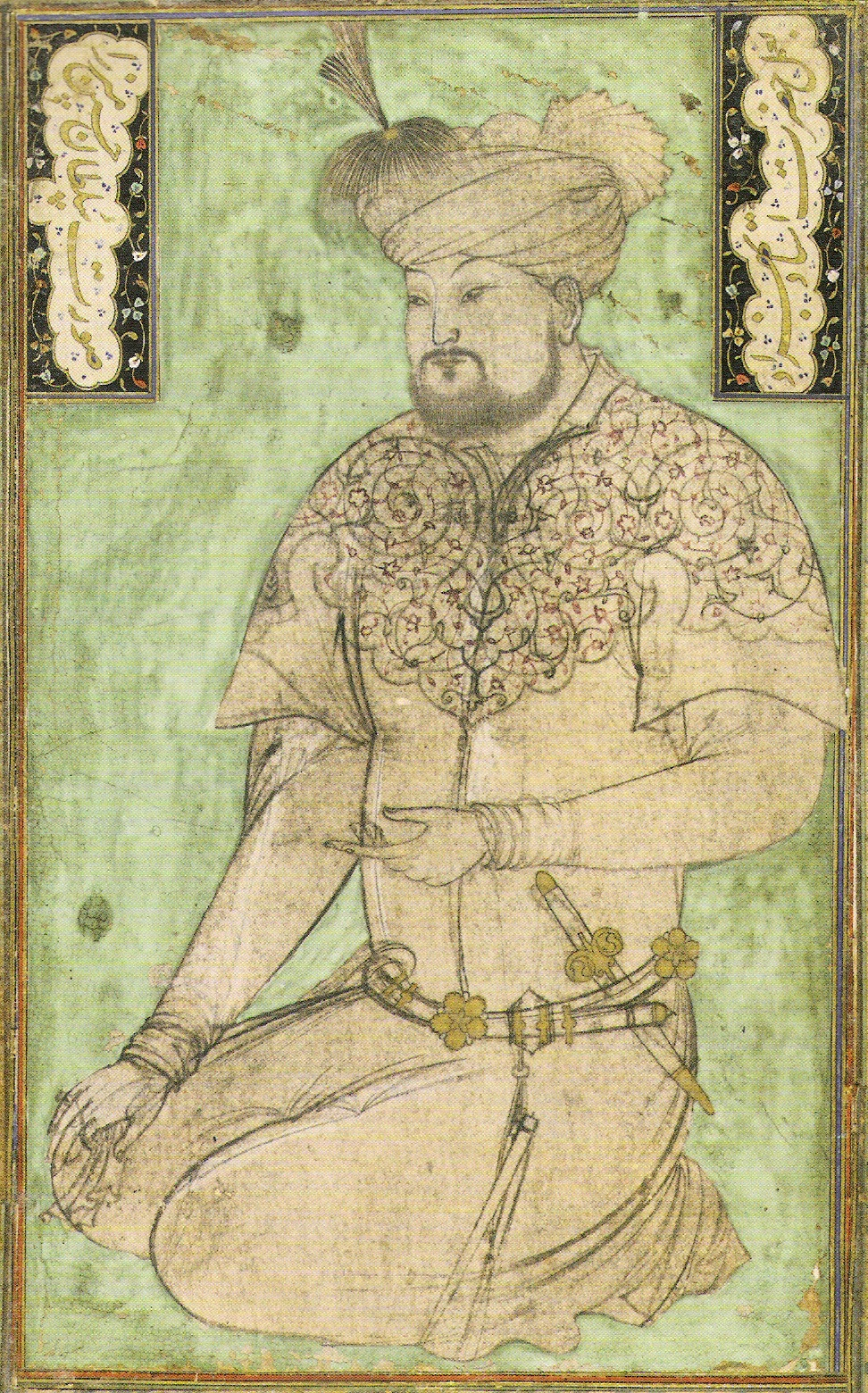
Portrait of Sultan Husayn Mirza Bayqara wearing a robe decorated châr-qâb, a cloud collar inspired by the Chinese yunjian.

In the Babur-náma, the cloud collar is referred as châr-qâb, which was either a garment or a shawl which was bestowed to its wearer as a mark of rank. The châr-qâb with four-lobed, either woven or embroidered with gold thread, was often seen as a garment motif in Timurid paintings and was associated with the Turkic rulers of Central Asia. The Timurid court had sent items to the Chinese court which was accepted as tributes. The Chinese also sent a yunjian made of gold brocade with tiger design, as well as royal robes and garments, to Sharukh.

Drawings of cloud collars were also produced in western Iran during the second half of the 1400s under the patronage of the Turkmen; the drawing traditional was developed through the interactions with the Chinese models.

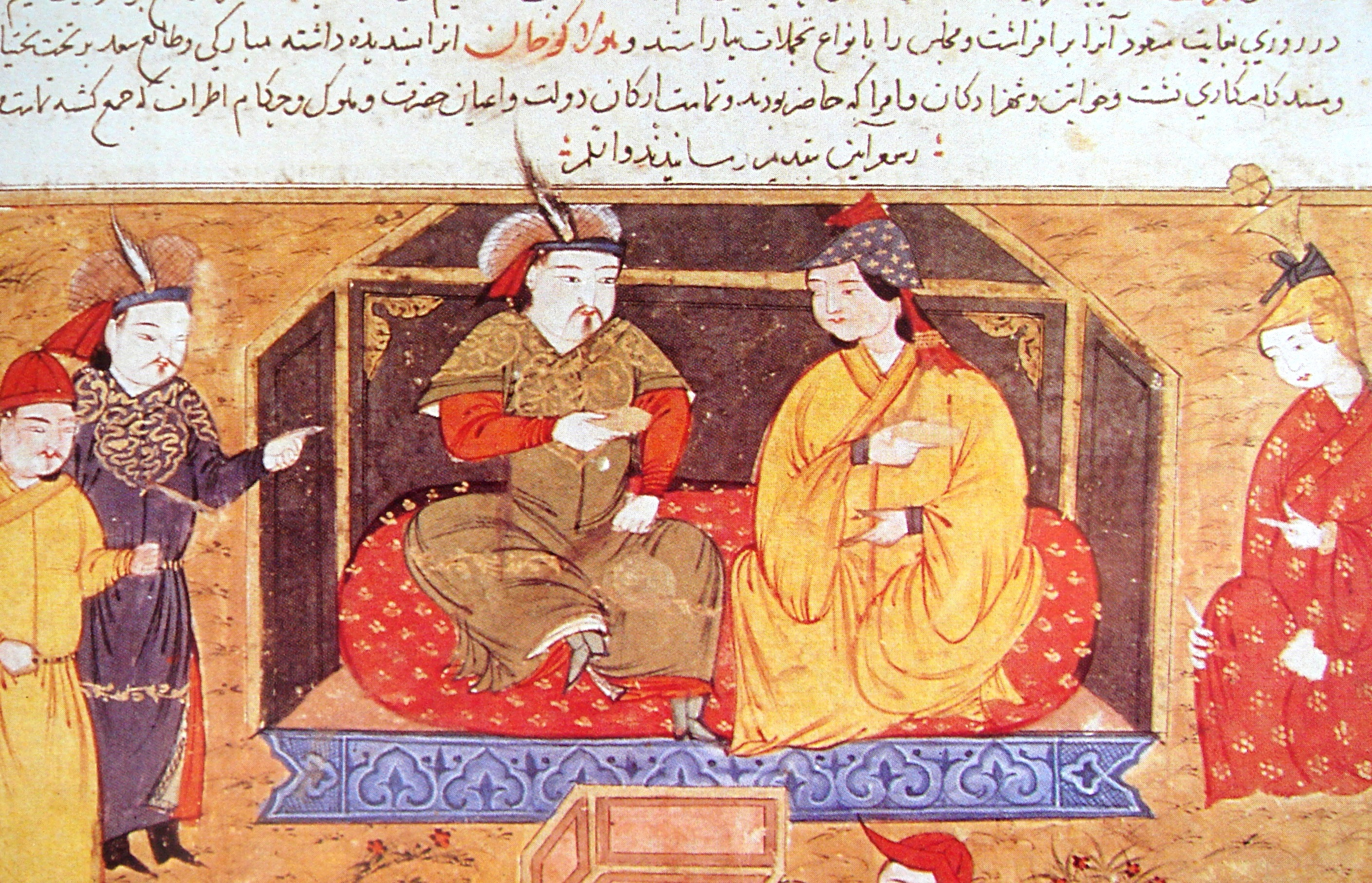
Yunjian motif on robes, by Rachid Al-Din

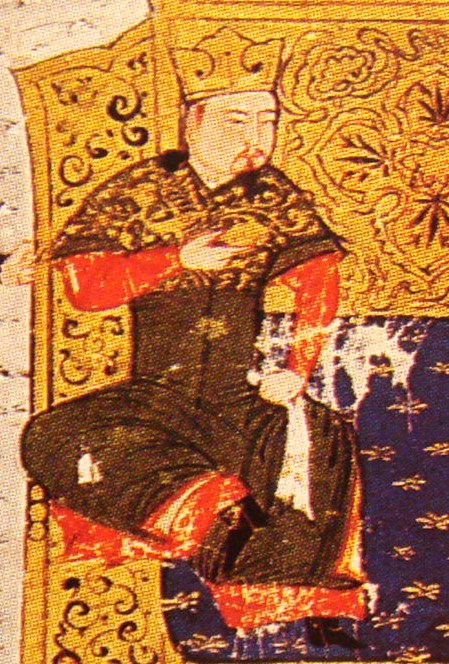
Tolui Khan wearing a half-sleeve robe with yunjian motif

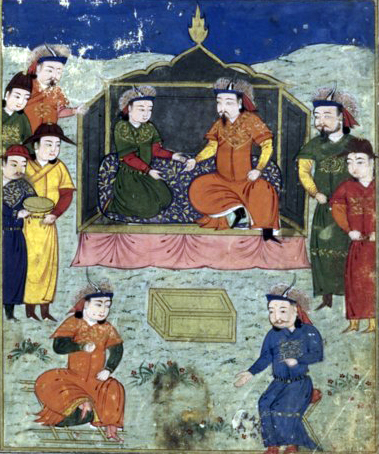
Arghun and Tegüder, Ilkhanate

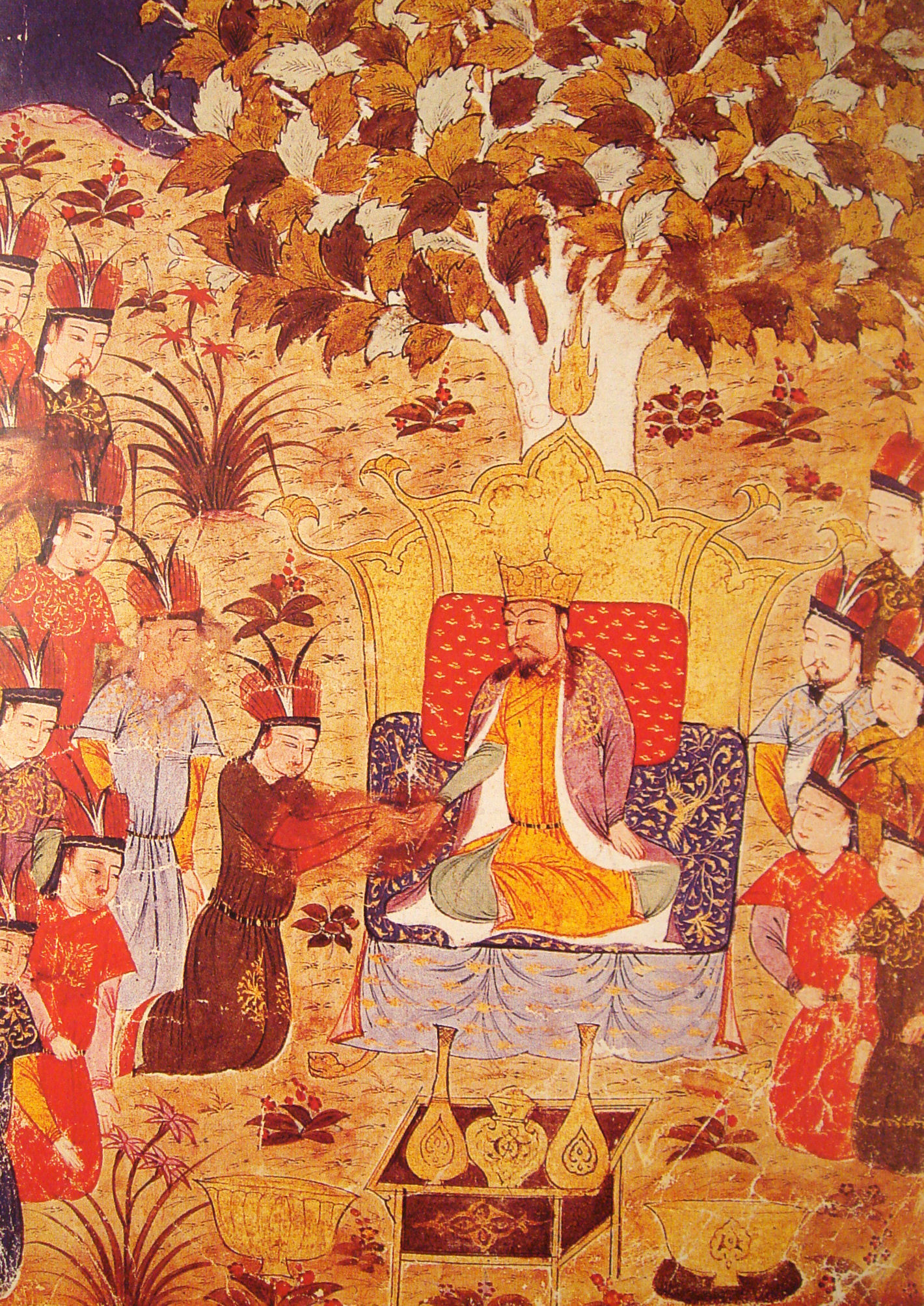
Coronation of Ogodei,1229

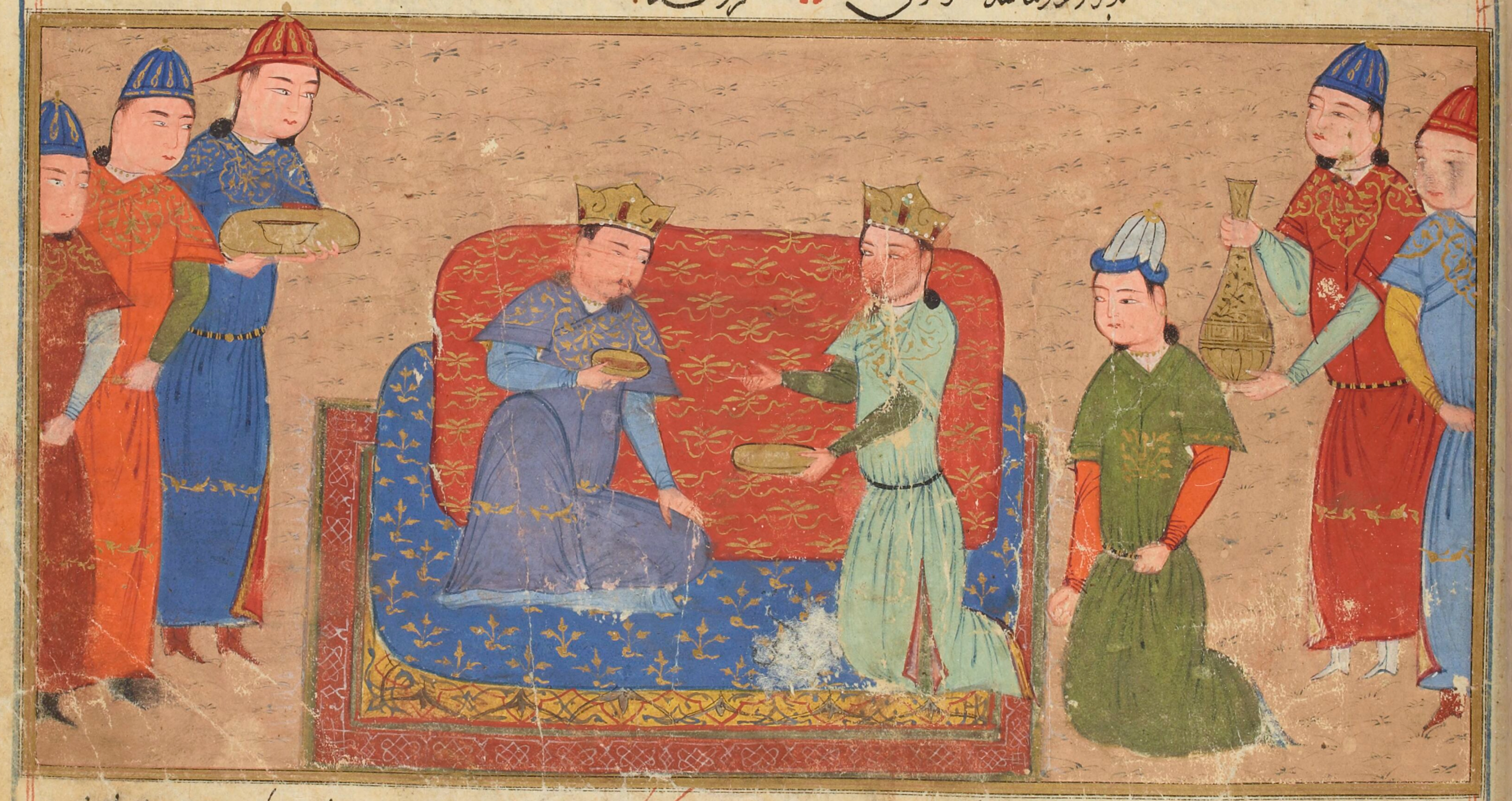
Genghis Khan and Wang Khan, by Rashid al-Din.

==== Nestorian art ====
Some Nestorian arts depict the cloud collar; for example, a Nestorian headstone which was discovered at the site of Xia Shrine (a district once reserve for Muslim and Christian burial) depict an angel dressed in Mongol style wearing a yunjian.

==== Japan ====
The Chinese cloud collar was also introduced in the arts of Japan where it is depicted on the image of the bodhisattva Manjusri.

==== Southeast Asia ====
In Southeast Asia, the Chinese yunjian appears to have directly influenced the scalloped collars which are one of the most prominent features on Southeast Asian aristocratic ceremonial clothing, and in particular, the court dancers clothing. These Southeast Asian cloud collar, which are also worn around the breasts and collar area, are ornamented with gold and silver, with embroidery, and contained gold leaf glue-work; they are often styled in Indianized forms of jewellery while the gold and silver decorations on the collars (especially found in the Malay Peninsula, Sumatra, and Java) are the results of the Chinese influence and Chinese craftsmanship.

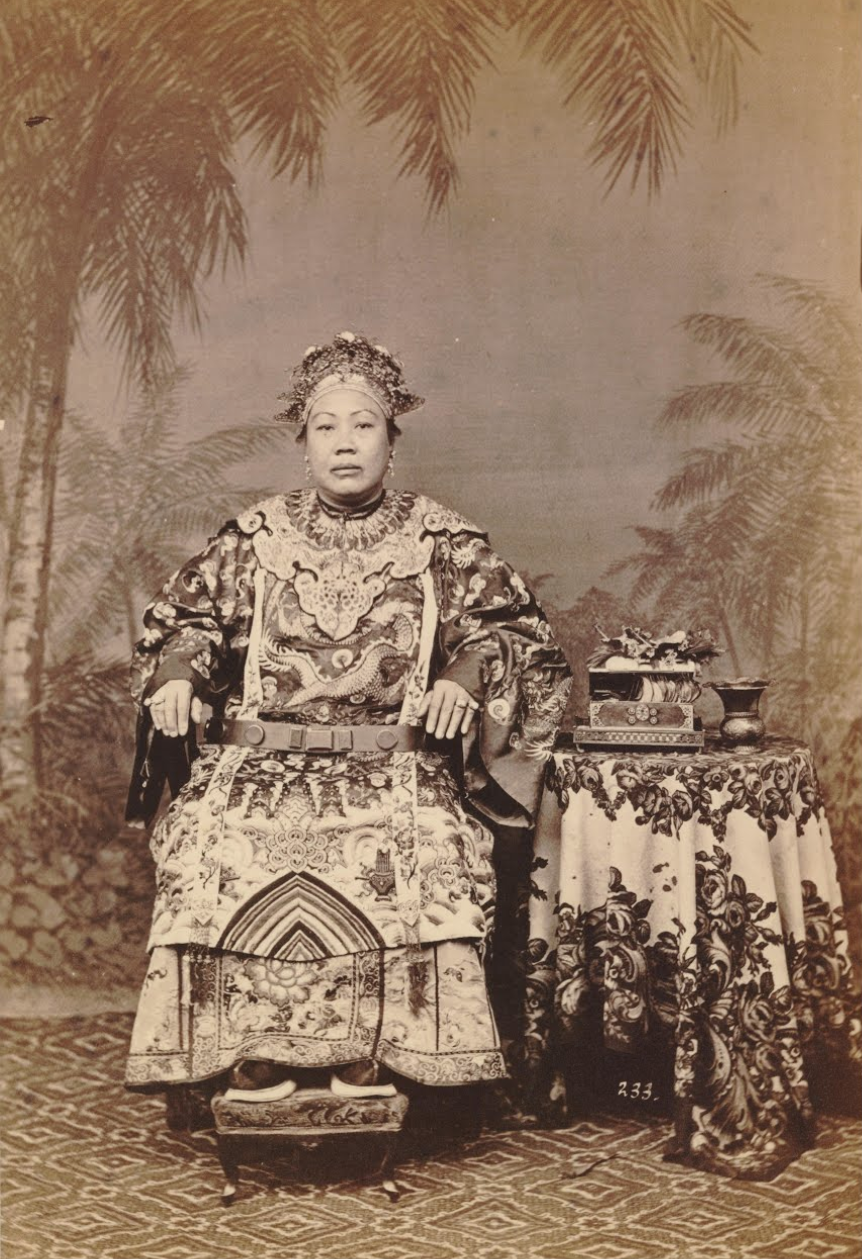
Njonja Majoor-titulair Be Biauw Tjoan (née Tan Ndjiang Nio).

In Vietnam, the cloud collar is known as vân kiên, which are historically worn by royals, nobles and officials. By the Nguyễn dynasty, it came to be associated with dancers and entertainers adorned with long strips, creating dynamic movements.

In Thailand, the Thai royal and theatrical clothing also included a form of cloud collar-like ornament which form peaked at the shoulders.

In Burma, the Burmese officials used to wear court clothing which contained a tiered and peaked cloud collar.

The Indonesian lengkung léhér (i.e. a ceremonial collar) worn by Palembang brides and court dancers, and similar cloud collars worn in the Malay peninsula appears to be a reflection of the historical presence of the Chinese brides in the Malay court.

The Peranakan Chinese brides wear cloud collars, which is sometimes referred as the "phoenix collar", as part of their wedding set of attire. The phoenix collar is multi-layered and the overlapping layers are movable which represent the feathers of a phoenix. The Peranakans are the descendants of the late 15th and 16th century AD Chinese traders who brought their culture to Southeast Asia, including Chinese traditions and clothing. The phoenix is the symbol of the empress and is an auspicious symbol for the Peranakan community. Following the Malay tradition, the couples were allowed to be treated like royalty on the day of their wedding.

The Chinese yunjian was also worn by the Chinese immigrants in Java in 1900s.

=== Ceramics ===
Some Mexican artists borrowed the cloud collar motif which was frequently used on the Chinese vases and adapted it in their own ceramic work. This can be seen from a Mexican vase dating from the late 17th-18th century where the Mexican artist expanded the cloud collar motif until it almost covered the entire surface of the vase.

=== Architecture ===
The symbolism of the yunjian motif as a heavenly "sky gate" led to its use by medieval Mongols in decorating their yurts, where a cloud collar pattern was sometimes cut from fabric and placed at the top of the tent, positioned around the yurt's central smoke hole.

In Iran and countries of the Near East following the Mongol conquest, the symbolic yunjian pattern was adapted in a similar manner to decorate the domes of mosques, usually combined with a finial on top of the dome representing the world axis penetrating through the sky gate. Motifs derived from Chinese cloud collars and lotuses were also used as lobed framing devices in the decorative tiling and plasterwork on the walls of Persian mosques and mausoleums.

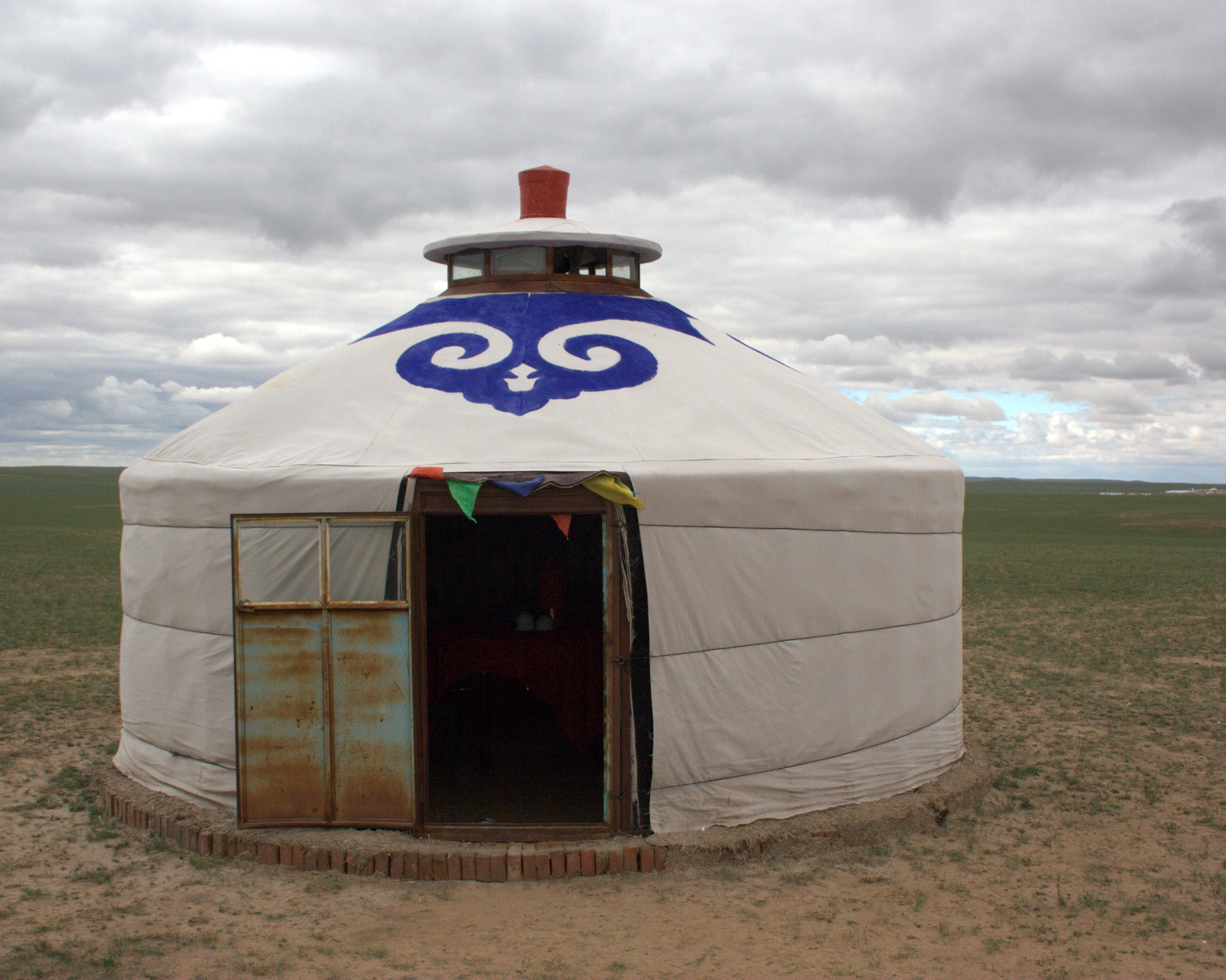
Blue fabric cloud collar motif on a Mongolian yurt.

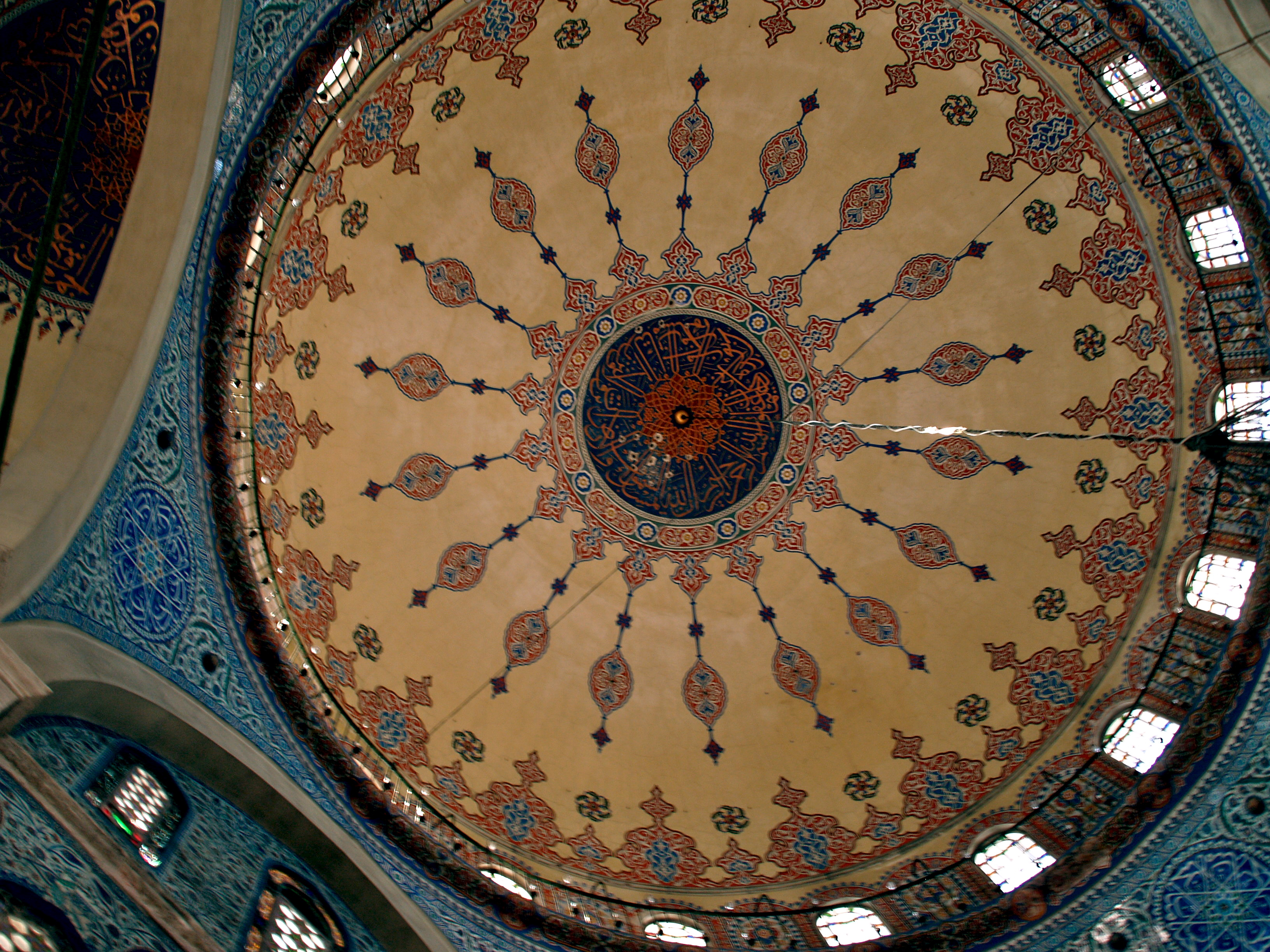
Red cloud collars inside the dome of Sokollu Mehmed Pasha Mosque (1568–1572) in Istanbul, Turkey.

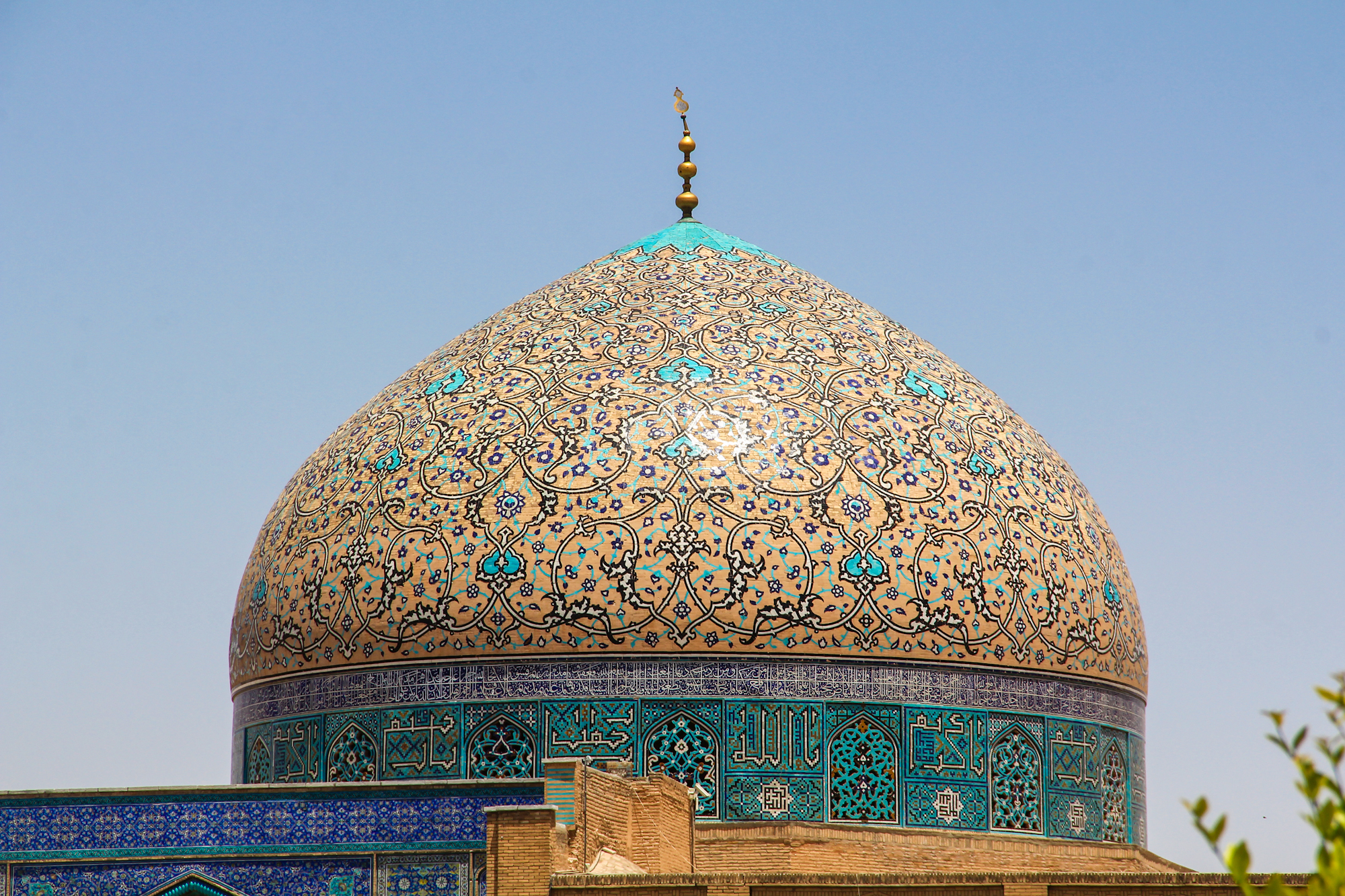
Turquoise cloud collar and ruyi symbols on the dome of Sheikh Lotfollah Mosque (1603–1619) in Isfahan, Iran.

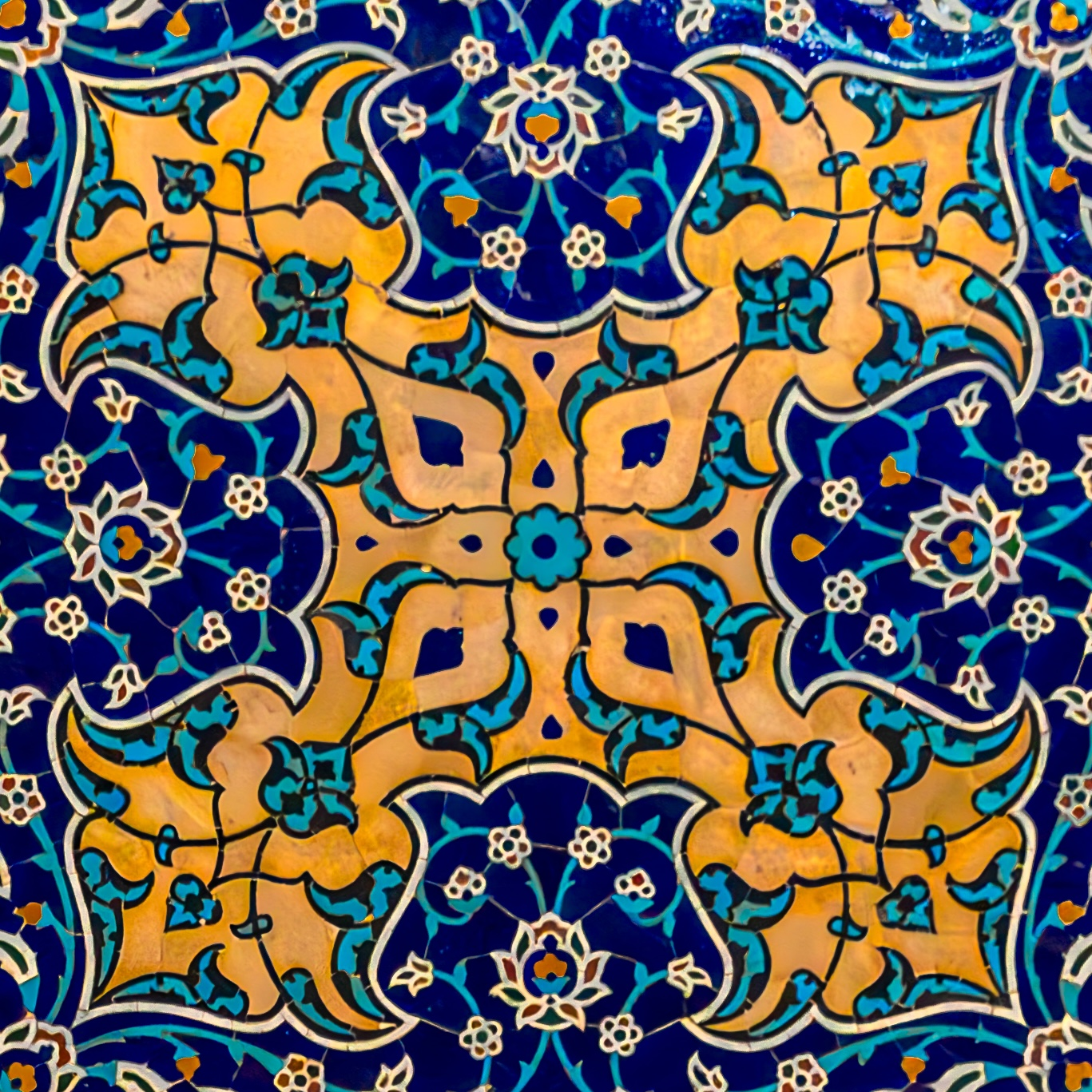
Cloud collar tile pattern inside Sheikh Lotfollah Mosque.

== See also ==
- Fashion in Yuan dynasty
- Hanfu
- Hanfu accessories
- Chinese clothing
- List of Chinese symbols, designs, and art motifs
