= Be Biauw Tjoan =

Businessman and bureaucrat in Dutch East Indies (1826–1904)

Padoeka Majoor-titulair der Chinezen Be Biauw Tjoan
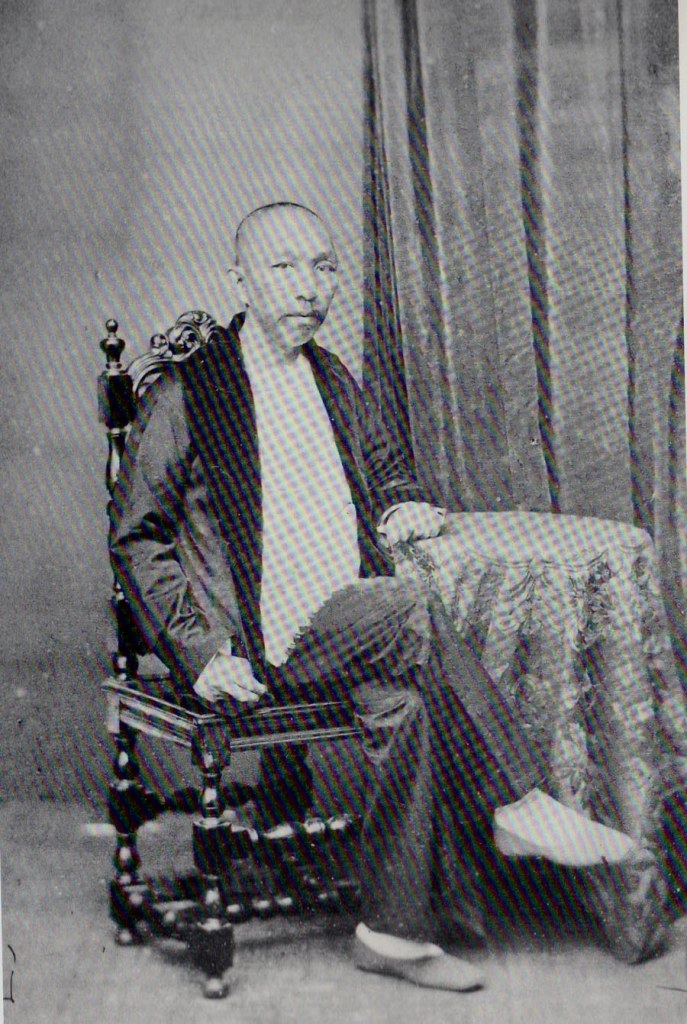
- Be Biauw Tjoan, Majoor-titulair der Chinezen, late 19th century

Luitenant der Chinezen
- In office 1846–1854
- Constituency: Semarang, Central Java

Kapitein-titulair der Chinezen
- In office 1854–1862

Majoor-titulair der Chinezen
- In office 1862–1863

Majoor-titulair der Chinezen
- In office 1872–1904

Personal details
- Born: 1826 Bagelen, Dutch East Indies
- Died: 1904 (aged 77–78) Semarang, Dutch East Indies
- Spouse: Tan Ndjiang Nio
- Relations: Tan Hong Yan, 2nd Majoor der Chinezen of Semarang (father-in-law); Liem Liong Hien, Majoor der Chinezen of Semarang (son-in-law); Be Kwat Koen, Majoor-titulair der Chinezen (nephew)
- Children: Be Tiong Khing (daughter); Be Kwat Kong (son); 4 adoptive sons
- Parents: Be Ing Tjioe, Majoor-titulair der Chinezen (father); Tjoa Tjoe Nio (mother)
- Occupation: Bureaucrat, revenue farmer, tycoon
- Awards: Knight of the Order of the White Elephant (1895)

Be Biauw Tjoan, Majoor-titulair der Chinezen (Chinese: 馬淼泉; pinyin: mǎ miǎo'quán, also Bhe Biauw Tjoan; 1826–1904) was one of the most important Chinese-Indonesian magnates in the second half of the nineteenth century. A bureaucrat, revenue farmer (pachter) and businessman, he headed the influential Be family of Bagelen, part of the ‘Cabang Atas’ gentry of the Indies.

== Life and career ==
Born in Central Java, Dutch East Indies (now Indonesia), Be was the eldest son of a ‘totok’ or first-generation Chinese migrant, the self-made tycoon and, later, bureaucrat Be Ing Tjioe, Majoor-titulair der Chinezen (1803–1857) by his ‘Peranakan’ wife, Tjoa Tjoe Nio. Be Biauw Tjoan had two younger brothers, Be Ik Sam and Be Soe Ie. The Be family of Bagelen rose up economically and socially through its intimate association with the more established Tan family of Semarang, one of Java’s most powerful Cabang Atas families.

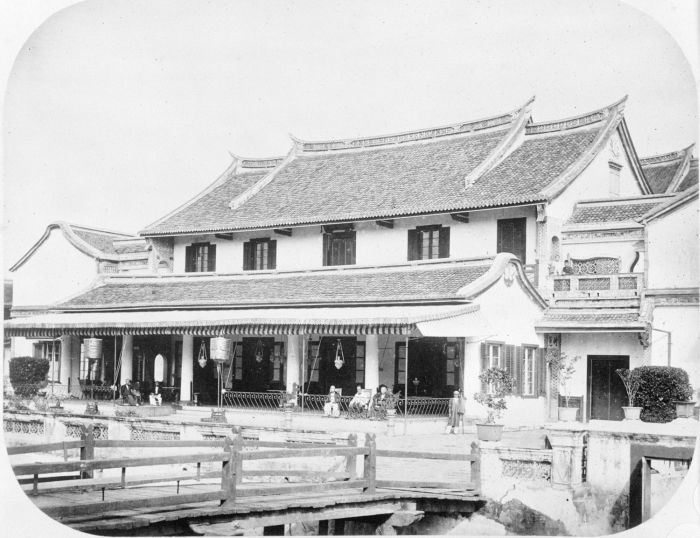
Kebon Dalem, the Semarang residence of Majoor Be Biauw Tjoan, 1870

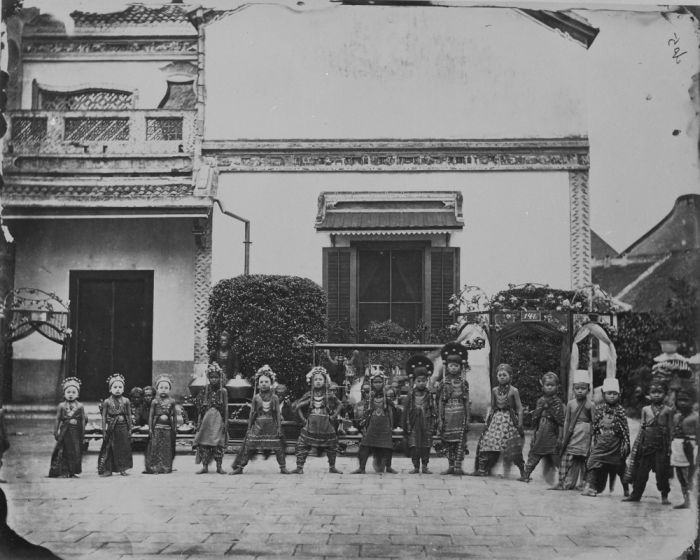
The private Javanese orchestra of Majoor Be Biauw Tjoan, 1857-1872

As part of this strategic alliance, Be Biauw Tjoan and his brother, Be Ik Sam, were betrothed and married off to the daughters of Tan Hong Yan, the 2nd Majoor der Chinezen of Semarang: Tan Ndjiang Nio and Tan Bien Nio respectively.

Be Biauw Tjoan, aged only 21, was raised to the bureaucratic post of Luitenant der Chinezen in Semarang in 1846, serving under his father-in-law. He was raised to the honorary rank of Kapitein-titulair der Chinezen in 1854, and that of Majoor-titulair in 1862. The Chinese officership, consisting of the ranks of Majoor, Kapitein and Luitenant der Chinezen, was an arm of the colonial civil bureaucracy through which the Dutch governed their Chinese subjects in the Indies. This system was known as 'indirect rule'.

Be’s involvement in Semarang’s Chinese bureaucracy was, probably, minimal – at least, later on – given his active career as a revenue farmer and businessman. According to the historian James R. Rush, Be stood at the heart of the Tan-Be Kongsi, or business partnership, that dominated Java’s opium farm leases, the colony’s most lucrative revenue farms, from the 1860s until the 1880s. The Majoor-titulair also had interests in other revenue farms, rice, sugar, plantations, shipping, warehousing and property all the way to Singapore, where he allegedly maintained a secret stake in the British colony’s opium farm.

In the 1860s, Christian Castens, the Resident of Bagelen gathered evidence of Be’s involvement in large-scale opium smuggling and distribution, not only to supplement the Kongsi’s official allotment, but also to undermine neighboring opium farms. In 1863 – in a massive blow to the Be-Tan partnership – Ludolph Anne Jan Witt, Baron Sloet van de Beele, the Governor-General of the Dutch East Indies, stripped Be of his titular Chinese mayoralty, and imposed a hefty fine on him and his partners for their illegal opium dealings. They were also forbidden thenceforth from participating in any of the opium farms.

Through a lengthy appeal to the colonial supreme court, Be was cleared of all charges in 1872, and was restored to his former position. In 1876, though his competitor submitted a formal complaint to the lower house of the Dutch parliament against Be’s supposed undermining of his opium farm, nothing was ever conclusively proven against him. The Majoor-titulair remained legally beyond reach, and retained his pre-eminence in the bureaucratic hierarchy and in business until the end of his life.

In March 1895, Be hosted King Chulalongkorn of Siam at his family residence, Kebon Dalem, in Semarang. The Thai monarch made his host a Knight of the Order of the While Elephant, which enhanced Be’s prominence in Java. The Be family’s friendship with the Thai monarchy would continue into the mid-twentieth century.

== Personal life ==
Majoor-titulair Be Biauw Tjoan and his wife, Tan Djiang Nio, only had one daughter, Be Tiong Khing. Their son-in-law, Liem Liong Hien, would later serve in a substantive capacity as Majoor der Chinezen of Semarang. The Majoor-titulair and his wife also adopted four of their nephews. Through a concubine, Be also had a son, Kapitein Be Kwat Kong.

Majoor-titulair Be Biauw Tjoan died in 1904. In 1914, his family founded Be Biauw Tjoan Bank, named after the deceased paterfamilias, which became one of the most important commercial banks in the colony for the next decade until its liquidation in 1927 due to the sugar crisis. Nonetheless, the Be family of Bagelen would remain one of the premier families of the Cabang Atas until the Indonesian revolution of 1945.
