= Tan Ndjiang Nio =

Peranakan aristocrat

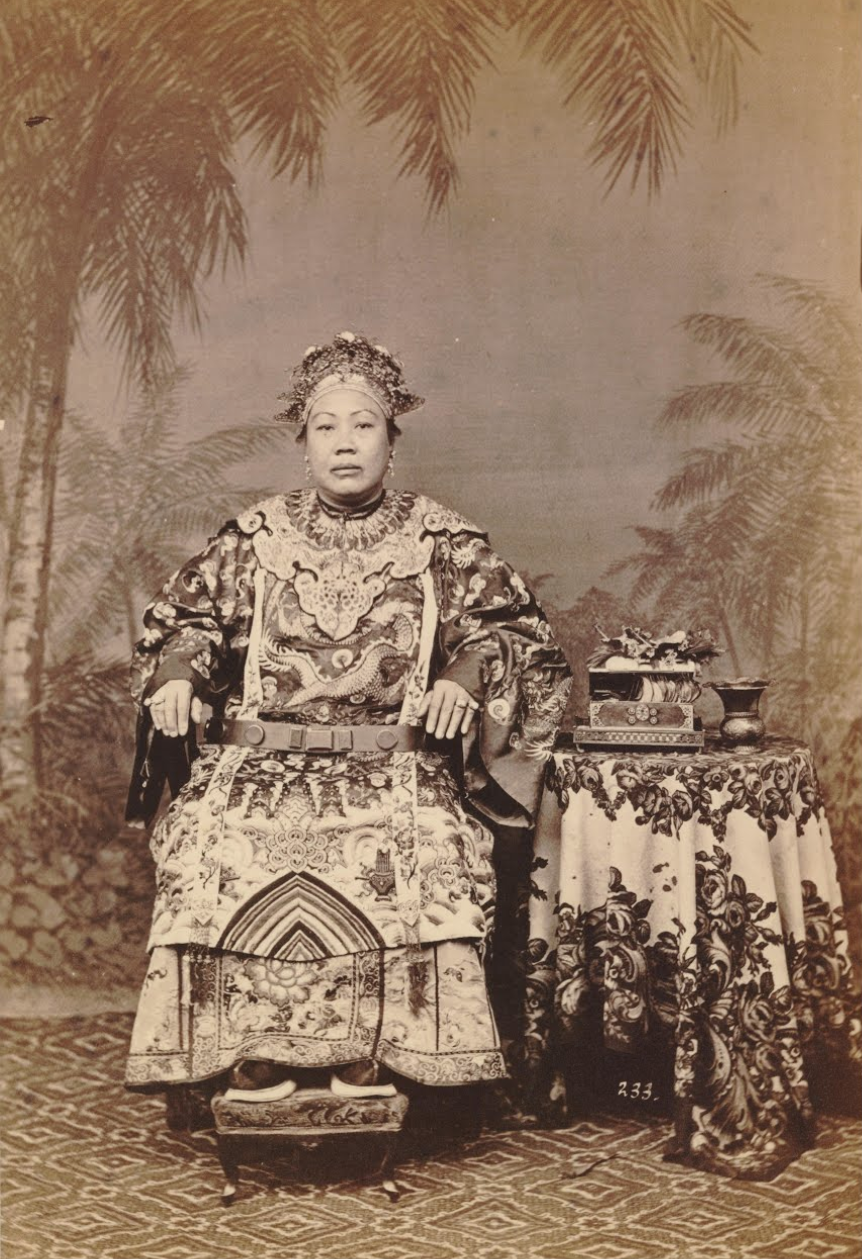
Njonja Majoor-titulair Be Biauw Tjoan (née Tan Ndjiang Nio), Woodbury & Page 1870

Tan Ndjiang Nio (1825–1870), better known as Njonja Majoor Be Biauw Tjoan, was a Peranakan aristocrat of the 'Cabang Atas' elite of the Dutch East Indies (now Indonesia). A lynchpin of her class, she was the wife, daughter, granddaughter, sister, daughter-in-law and mother-in-law of Semarang's Majoors der Chinezen. This was the highest rank of the Chinese officership, a branch of the civil bureaucracy through which the Dutch governed their Chinese subjects in the Indies.

Tan was born in Semarang, Central Java into what was then the city's most powerful Chinese dynasty, the Tan family of Semarang. Her father, Tan Hong Yan, served as the second Majoor der Chinezen of Semarang from 1836 until 1851 in succession to her grandfather, Tan Tiang Tjhing (1770–1833). In 1811, the latter was appointed the first Majoor der Chinezen of Semarang and, in fact, the whole of the Dutch East Indies.

She was married to Be Biauw Tjoan, Majoor-titulair der Chinezen (1826–1904), son of the tycoon Majoor-titulair Be Ing Tjioe (1803–1857), part of the Be family of Bagelen. Her husband's family had risen up socially and economically through their association with her family, an alliance that was sealed by their marriage. Tan's brother, Tan Tjong Hoay, also served as Semarang's Majoor from 1862 until 1878. The only child of her marriage to Majoor-titulair Be Biauw Tjoan, Be Tiong Khing, was married to Liem Liong Hien, who succeeded his in-laws as Majoor of Semarang from 1885 until 1904.

Tan Ndjiang Nio died in 1870 at the height of her family's power, wealth and influence. The historian Liem Thian Joe dubbed her Kim Ki Giok Hiap, likening her to a tree with branches of gold and jade in reference to her Chinese mayoral pedigree, marriage and posterity. Agreeing with Liem, James R. Rush calls her 'the most eminent peranakan woman of her day'.
