= Tio Tek Hong =

Indonesian photographer (1877–1965)

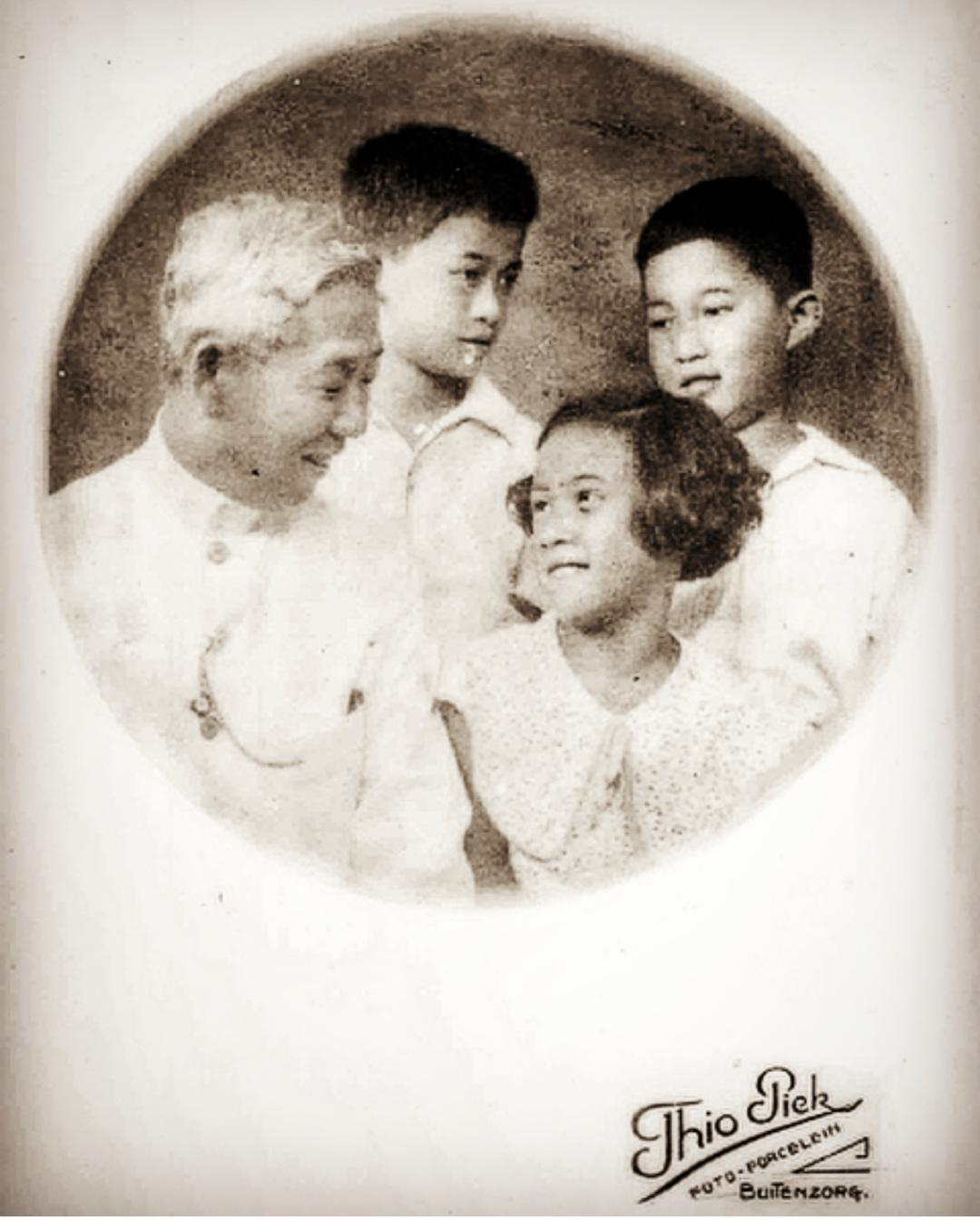
- Tio Tek Hong and his family
- Born: 1877
- Died: 1965 (aged 87–88); Djakarta
- Occupations: Businessman; record producer; publisher; memoirist
- Years active: 1910s-1960s
- Known for: Pioneer of the Indonesian music recording industry
- Spouse: Thung Ien Nio (wife)
- Parent(s): Tio Tjeng Sioe (father); Lie Loemoet Nio (mother)
- Relatives: Tio Tek Soen, Kapitein der Chinezen (brother); Lie Pek Tat, Kapitein-titulair der Chinezen (grandfather); Lie Tiang Ko, Kapitein-titulair der Chinezen (great-grandfather); Tio Tek Ho, 4th Majoor der Chinezen (cousin); Lie Tjoe Hong, 3rd Majoor der Chinezen (cousin); Hok Hoei Kan (cousin-in-law); Nj. Kapitein Lie Tjian Tjoen (cousin-in-law)

Tio Tek Hong (1877–1965) was a colonial Indonesian businessman and record executive, best-remembered as a pioneer of the Indonesian music recordings industry and as the founder of Toko Tio Tek Hong, one of the country's earliest modern department stores. He was also the first person to make a recording, in 1929, of Indonesia's future national anthem, Indonesia Raya.

== Family background and early life ==
Born in 1877 in the fashionable district of Pasar Baru, Batavia, Dutch East Indies, Tio was the son of prominent businessman Tio Tjeng Sioe (b. 1844) and Lie Loemoet Nio (b. 1856). He came from important and well-connected Peranakan lineages of the 'Tjabang Atas' gentry on both sides of his family.

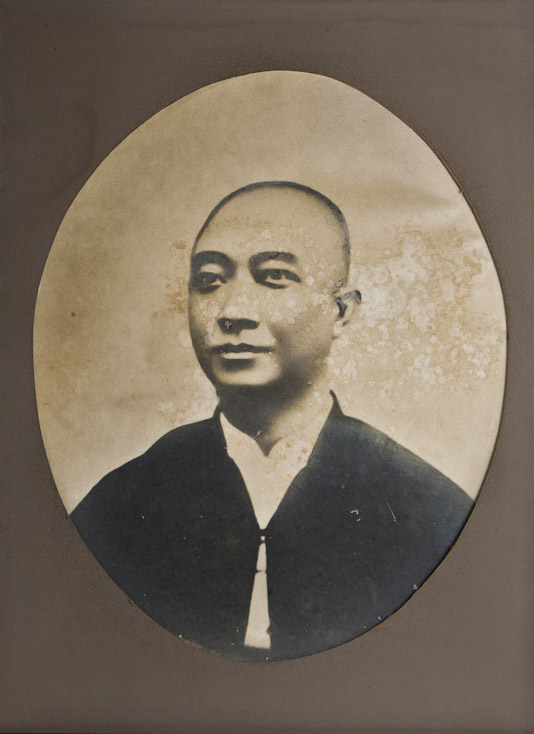
Tio's cousin, Tio Tek Ho, 4th Majoor der Chinezen of Batavia

Through his father, he was the grandson of a leading merchant Tio Him and Thung Eng Nio. His elder half-brother, Tio Tek Soen, served as Kapitein der Chinezen in Batavia, while his much-older first cousin, Tio Tek Ho, was the fourth Majoor der Chinezen of Batavia (in office from 1896 until 1907). The Chinese officership, consisting of the ranks of Majoor, Kapitein and Luitenant der Chinezen, was an arm of the Dutch colonial government with administrative and judicial jurisdiction over the colony's Chinese subjects.

On his mother's side, Tio came from the influential Lie family of Pasilian as a grandson of the high official Lie Pek Tat, Kapitein-titulair der Chinezen, and a great-grandson of the Landheer [landlord] Lie Tiang Ko, Kapitein-titulair der Chinezen. Tio's mother was also a first cousin of Lie Tjoe Hong, the third Majoor der Chinezen of Batavia (in office from 1879 until 1896). Through her, Tio was also a second cousin of Lie Tien Nio, wife of the colonial statesman H. H. Kan; and of the bureaucrat Lie Tjian Tjoen, Kapitein der Chinezen, husband of the women's rights activist Aw Tjoei Lan.

As a privileged member of the colonial establishment, he was able to attend the elite Europeesche Lagere School, commencing in 1884, which gave him a Dutch-language education.

== Career ==
In 1902, together with his brother Tio Tek Tjoe, Tio founded the eponymous Toko Tio Tek Hong, one of the earliest modern department stores in colonial Indonesia, selling merchandise labelled with non-negotiable fixed prices, an unusual practice at the time. The store was successful and became one of the most popular shopping destinations in the Dutch colonial capital. Tio expanded his store by acquiring adjoining properties, and twice rebuilt it, first in 1911, then again in 1916, inaugurating the present building in 1917 to coincide with his store's 15th anniversary. The firm continued to grow with the opening, in 1921, of a branch store at Sukabumi in the Preanger, West Java. In 1927, Tio's department store celebrated its 25th anniversary; the popular newspaper Nieuws van den Dag voor Nederlandsch-Indië declares:

"The firm was the first to have a large modern retail space, a pleasant change from shophouses and market sheds; its opening was an event in the history of the capital. What Tio Tek Hong has been to Batavians of tempo doeloe [former times] can best be seen from the fact that they used to say: 'If it is not available at Tio Tek Hong, then do not try it elsewhere. You won't get it anywhere."

Toko Tio Tek Hong
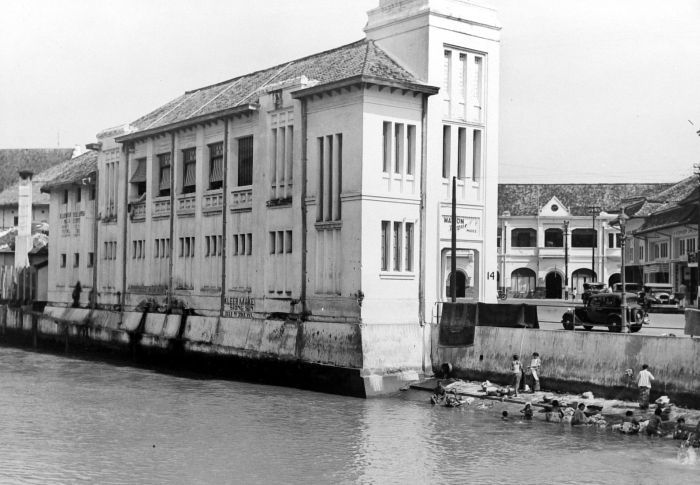
Toko Tio Tek Hong in Pasar Baru, Weltevreden

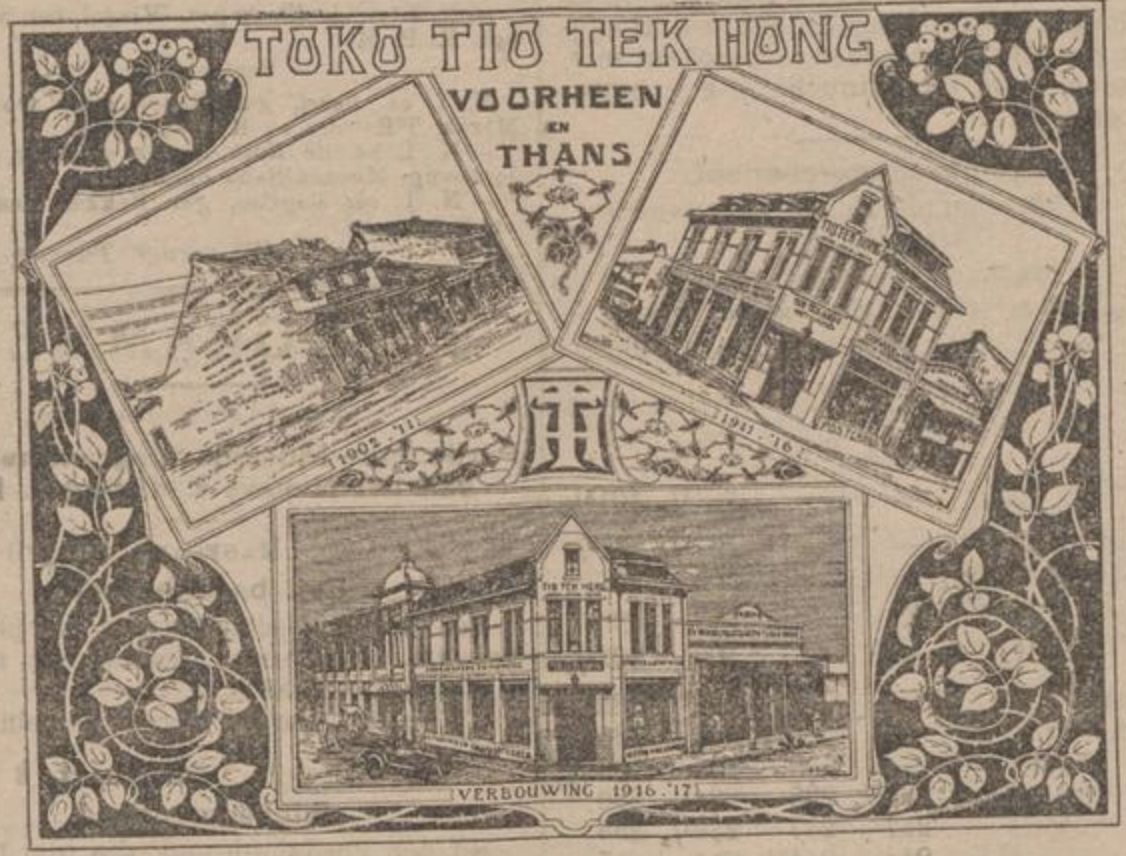
Toko Tio Tek Hong in 1902, 1911 and 1916

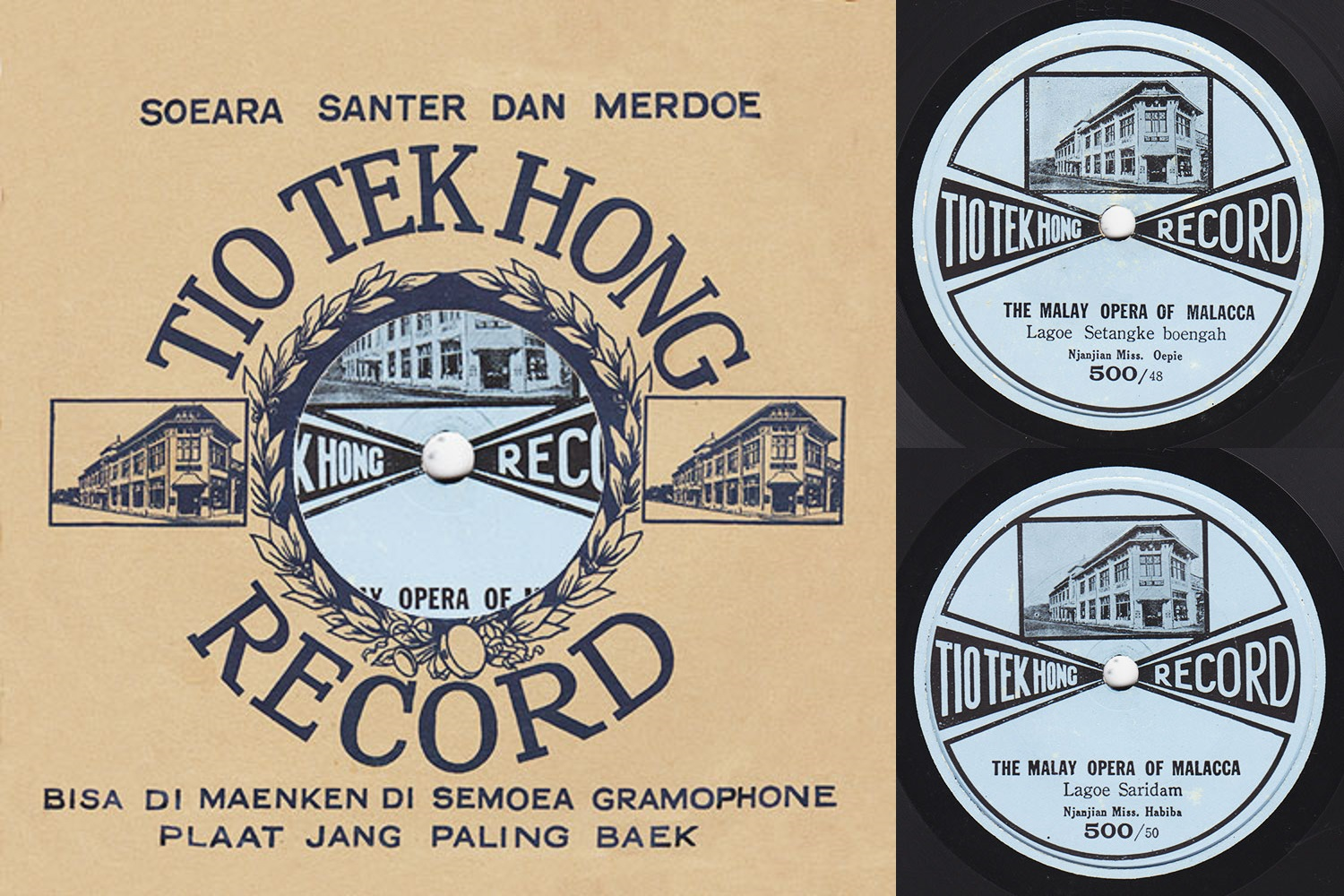
Tio Tek Hong Record, early 20th century

Today, the building that used to house this pioneering department store has become a local historic landmark in modern-day Jakarta.

While his core business was initially sport and hunting equipment, in 1903 Tio became the sole agent in Batavia for the newly established German record label company Odeon Records. A year later, in 1904, Tio started to release records under his own name, Tio Tek Hong Record, as a subsidiary of Odean–the first to do so in Indonesia. His record producing focused on discs of popular Malay-language songs, including kroncong and stambul music. By 1917, Tio's company had 'almost a monopoly in the Indies' over this genre, and 'contributed much to give the name of the firm a melodious sound'.

In 1929, Tio got in touch with the songwriter W. R. Supratman, who wrote both the lyrics and melody of the future national anthem of Indonesia, 'Indonesia Raya'. The two agreed to issue records of the new anthem with Supratman retaining its copyright. While the new records were popular, in the 1930 the Dutch colonial authorities placed a ban on the song and confiscated all remaining unsold records.

Tio's businesses declined in the 1930s due to the Great Depression; and in 1934, the firm vacated its premises for a smaller venue. The business survived, however, until the 1950s, albeit in a more modest form.

Apart from his business career, Tio was active in several community organisations, playing an important role in the founding, in 1902, of Musica, a European music association whose mission was to provide tuition in western music theory and musical instruments, such as the piano, the violin and the cello. From 1902 until 1904, Tio acted as a commissioner on the governing board of the influential, Confucian renewal and educational organisation Tiong Hoa Hwee Koan, which operated under the patronage of Tio's cousin, Majoor Tio Tek Ho. A keen hunter, Tio was also a founding board member and honorary secretary and treasurer of the Nederlandsch-Indisch Jagersgenootschap [Netherlands Indies Hunting Association], which was established on June 21, 1931.

In 1959, Tio Tek Hong published his memoir, Kenang-kenangan: riwajat-hidup saja dan keadaan di Djakarta dari tahun 1882 sampai sekarang ['Recollections: My Life and Djakarta from 1882 until the Present']. He died in 1965 in Djakarta.

== Major works ==
- Kenang-kenangan: riwajat-hidup saja dan keadaan di Djakarta dari tahun 1882 sampai sekarang (in Indonesian) [English: 'Recollections: My Life and Djakarta from 1882 until the Present']. Tio Tek Hong (1959)
