= Lie family of Pasilian =

Chinese-Indonesian family of landlords

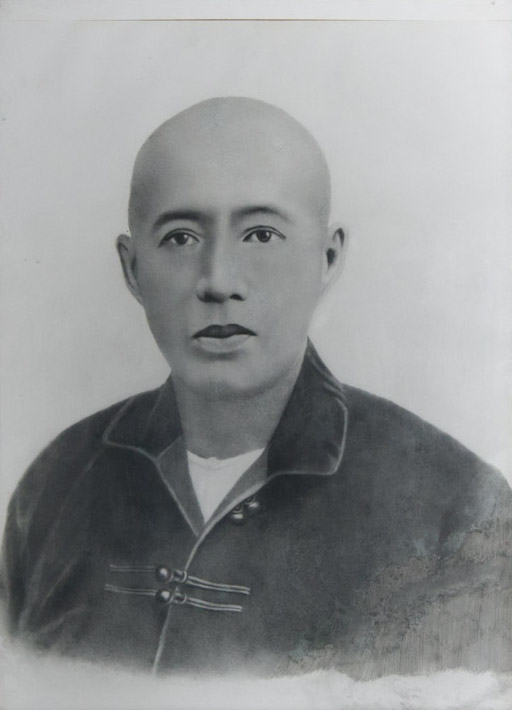
- Lie Tjoe Hong, 3rd Majoor der Chinezen of Batavia (1846–1896)
- Current region: Jakarta, Banten
- Origin: Fujian, Qing Empire
- Founded: mid-18th century
- Founder: Lie Kong
- Titles: Majoor, Kapitein and Luitenant der Chinezen; Sia
- Members: Kapitein-titulair Lie Tiang Ko; Lie Tjoe Hong, 3rd Majoor der Chinezen; Lie Tjoe Tjiang, Luitenant der Chinezen; H. H. Kan (by marriage); Lie Tjian Tjoen, Kapitein der Chinezen; Aw Tjoei Lan (by marriage)
- Connected families: The Oey family of Kemiri; The Tan family of Cirebon; The Khouw family of Tamboen; The Lauw-Sim-Zecha family

The Lie family of Pasilian was an aristocratic Chinese-Indonesian family of landlords, officials and community leaders, part of the ‘Tjabang Atas’ or the Peranakan Chinese gentry of the Dutch East Indies (now Indonesia). For over a century, from 1847 until the 1952, members of the family served as Chinese officers, producing a total of nine office-holders, including Lie Tjoe Hong, the third Majoor der Chinezen of Batavia (present-day Jakarta). The Chinese officership, consisting of the ranks of Majoor, Kapitein and Luitenant der Chinezen, was an arm of the Dutch colonial government with administrative and judicial jurisdiction over the colony's Chinese subjects.

== Founding in colonial Indonesia ==
The family line in Indonesia goes back to a Chinese-born, or Totok migrant, Lie Kong, who probably settled in Batavia in the second half of the 18th century. He had three sons, Lie Peng Ko, Lie Tieuw Ko and the youngest, Lie Tiang Ko, later Kapitein-titulair der Chinezen (1786–1855). Having gained great wealth in business at the beginning of the nineteenth century, the Lie family bought into land, including their principal particuliere land or private domain, Pasilian, in Banten since landownership was seen as more respectable than business.

Lie Tiang Ko was married to a locally-born Peranakan woman, Souw Sek Nio (1791–1845), who bore him five sons, Lie Pek Thay (1809–1849), Lie Pek Hauw (b. 1815), Lie Pek Hoat (d. 1876), Lie Pek Tat (1832–1915) and Lie Pek Sie (b. 1835), as well as one daughter, Lie Ho Nio. Lie also adopted his brother Lie Tioe Ko's son, Lie Pek Tjiat, bringing his total number of sons to six.

== The Chinese Officership and public administration ==
In 1847, Lie Tiang Ko and his eldest son Lie Pek Thay were both granted the honorary titles of Luitenant-titulair der Chinezen. They had no administrative responsibilities since their titles were honorary and were, probably, granted thanks to their great wealth and increasing prominence. In 1850, Luitenant-titulair Lie Tiang Ko was further promoted to the rank of Kapitein-titulair der Chinezen. He died in 1855 as a pillar of the Chinese colonial establishment: Chinese officer, Landheer [landlord] and one of the wealthiest men in the colony.

In addition to his eldest son who had predeceased him, two of the Kapitein's five other sons were raised to the officership. Lie Pek Hoat became the family's first substantive officer on his appointment in 1863 as Luitenant der Chinezen of Lontar Tanara, an outlying district in Banten, where the family's landholdings were concentrated; in 1866, he was promoted to the post of Kapitein der Chinezen of Serang, capital of Banten. His younger brother, Lie Pek Tat, had earlier been appointed, in 1859, to the Wees- en Boedelkamer [the Orphans and Estate Chamber] as a Boedelmeester, or a state trustee for insolvent and intestate estates, initially with the honorary title of Luitenant-titulair, then from February 1, 1885, with the title of Kapitein-titulair.

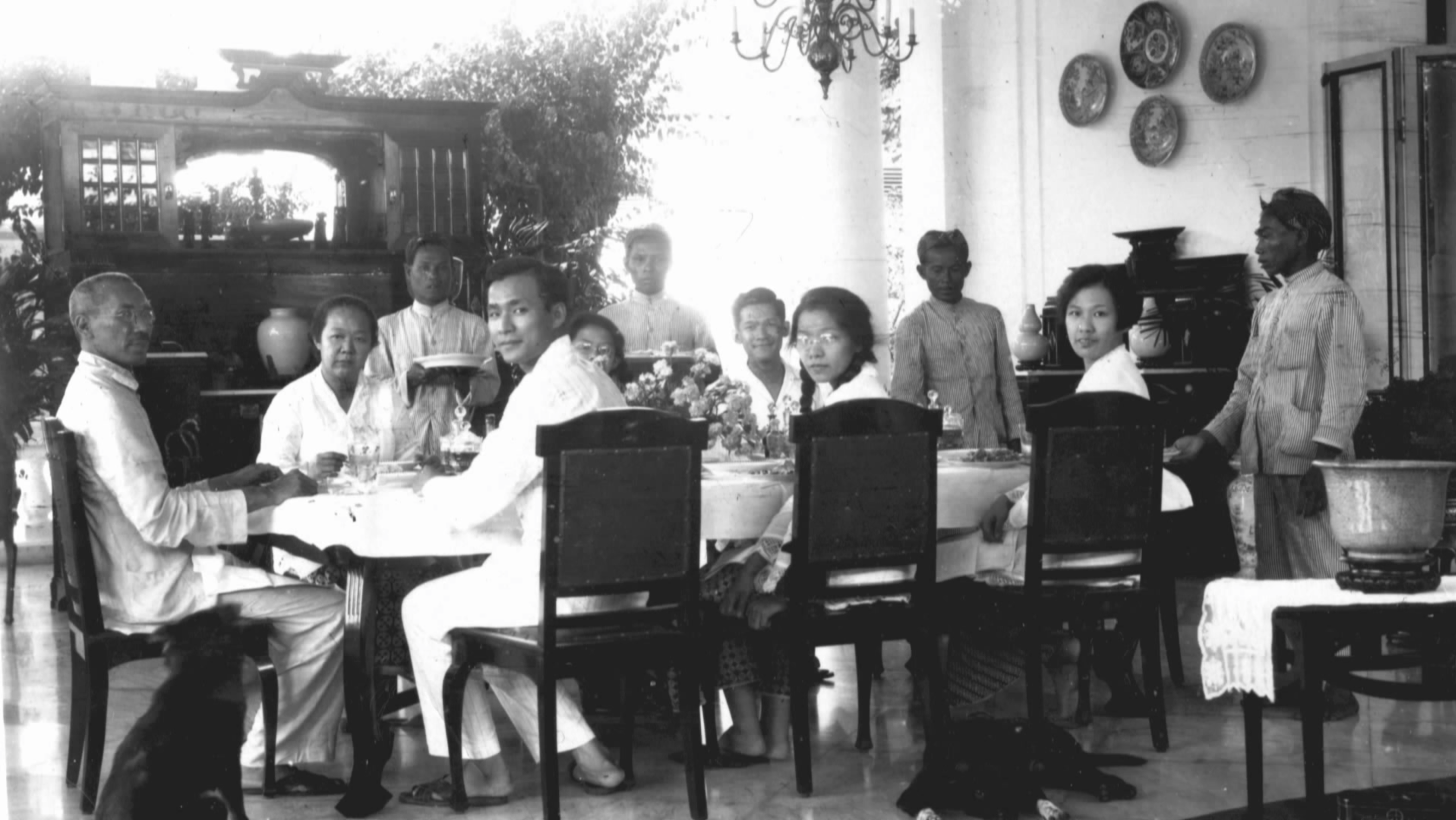
Lie Tien Nio, daughter of Majoor Lie Tjoe Hong, with her husband the statesman H. H. Kan (1881—1951) and their children

In the third generation, three members of the family rose to the officership. In 1866, Lie Tjoe Hong (1846 – 1896), son of Luitenant-titulair Lie Pek Thay, was appointed Luitenant der Chinezen of Lontar Tanara in succession to his uncle, the recently promoted Kapitein Lie Pek Hoat of Serang. He resigned in 1868, but in 1872 was reappointed to the Chinese Lieutenancy in Batavia with a seat on the Kong Koan [the Chinese Council], the highest Chinese organ of governance in the Indies. In 1876, he was promoted to Kapitein; then on February 18, 1879, he was appointed to succeed the outgoing Majoor Tan Tjoen Tiat as the third Majoor der Chinezen of Batavia and ex officio chairman of the Kong Koan.

Lie Tjoe Tjiang (b. 1827), son of Lie Pek Tjiat, was raised to the Chinese Officership, as a Luitenant-titulair, on the same year as the Majoor in 1866, then preceded the latter with his appointment in 1868 to the Kong Koan as a substantive Luitenant, serving in office until 1879. Much later, between 1911 and 1913, another cousin of the third generation, Lie Tjoe Tjin (b. 1862, son of Kapitein Lie Pek Hoat of Serang) served as Luitenant der Chinezen of Buitenzorg.

In the fourth generation, two members of the family were elevated to the officership. In 1885, Lie Tjian Som, son of Lie Tjoe Ie and grandson of Lie Pek Tjiat, was raised to the honorary rank of Luitenant-titulair der Chinezen. In 1913, his cousin Lie Tjian Tjoen, eldest son of Majoor Lie Tjoe Hong, was raised to the substantive rank of Luitenant der Chinezen. In 1915, Luitenant Lie Tjian Tjoen was appointed an acting Kapitein, temporarily replacing Kapitein Tio Tek Soen prior to his definitive elevation, in 1917, to the rank of Kapitein. Kapitein Lie Tjian Tjoen was the last active Kapitein der Chinezen in Indonesia and the last chairman of the Kong Koan as a government institution, retaining both posts beyond the Indonesian Revolution (1945–1949) into the first couple of years of the independent Republic of Indonesia. He was relieved of his Chinese Captaincy with the abolition of the Chinese officership by a decree of the Governor of Jakarta in 1952.

== Notable members of the family ==
- Lie Tiang Ko, Kapitein-titulair der Chinezen: landlord, Chinese officer and businessman
- Lie Tjoe Hong, third Majoor der Chinezen of Batavia: public administrator, landlord
- Lie Tjoe Tjiang, Luitenant der Chinezen: public administrator, landlord
- H. H. Kan (by marriage), husband of Lie Tien Nio and son-in-law of Majoor Lie Tjoe Hong: statesman, community leader and landlord
- Lie Tjian Tjoen, Kapitein der Chinezen, son of Majoor Lie Tjoe Hong: public administrator, landlord
- Aw Tjoei Lan (by marriage, wife of Kapitein Lie Tjian Tjoen and daughter-in-law of Majoor Lie Tjoe Hong: women's rights activist and community leader
- Tio Tek Hong (son of Lie Loemoet Nio, grandson of Kapitein-titulair Lie Pek Tat): businessman, pioneer of the Indonesian music recording industry, writer
