= Toko Tio Tek Hong =

Tio Tek Hong Shop
- Toko Tio Tek Hong
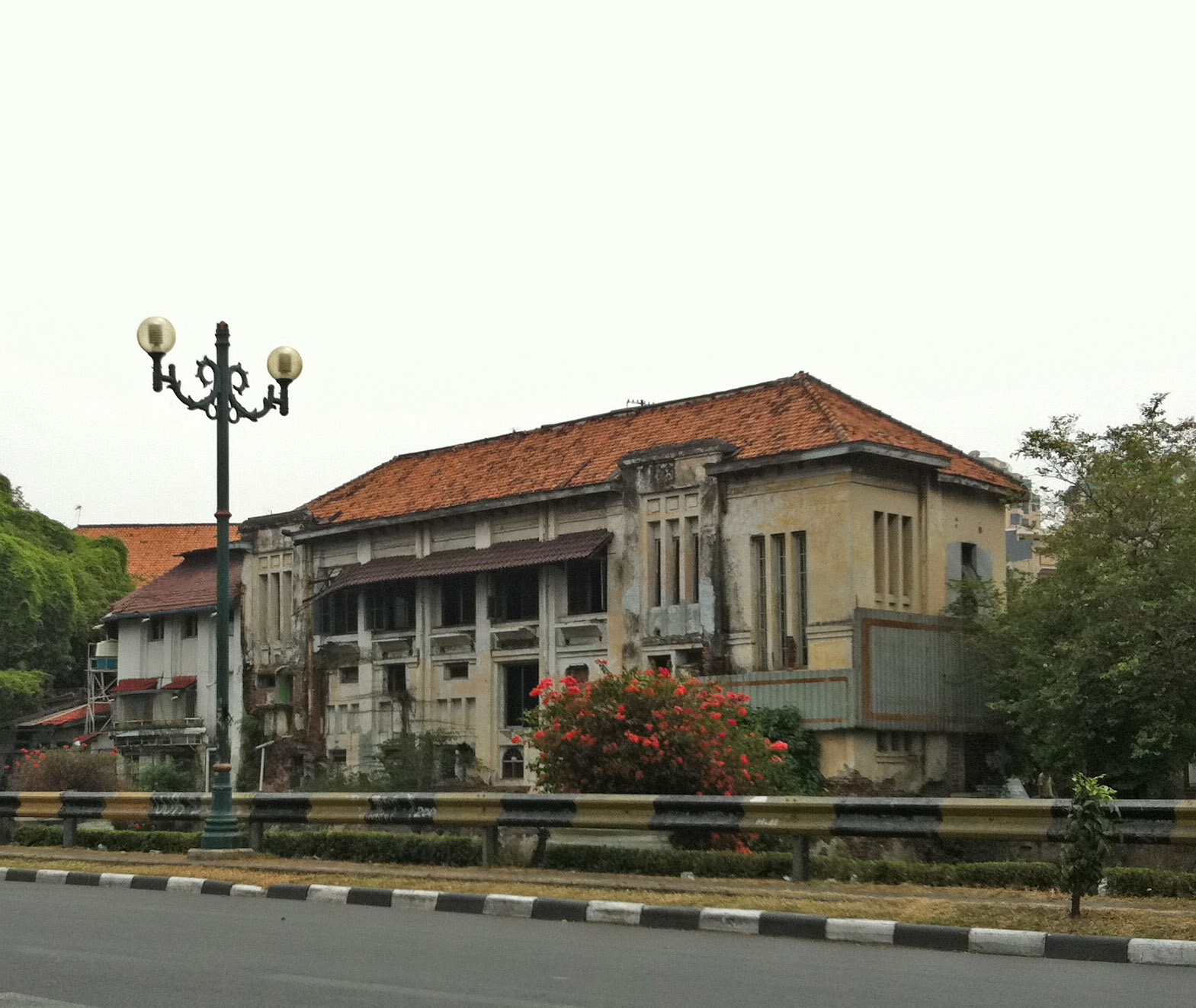
- Toko Tio Tek Hong in 2011
- Interactive map of the Tio Tek Hong Shop area

General information
- Type: Store
- Architectural style: Rationalist, Indies architecture
- Location: Central Jakarta, Jakarta, Indonesia, Jl. Pintu Air Raya
- Coordinates: 6.167141°S 106.831749°E
- Elevation: 6 m (20 ft)
- Inaugurated: 1902

Toko Tio Tek Hong (Indonesian for 'Tio Tek Hong's Store') was one of the earliest modern department stores in colonial Indonesia, founded in 1902 by the prominent businessman Tio Tek Hong (1877–1965).

Its former premises are now a colonial landmark in Jakarta, capital of Indonesia. The building is located at the junction where the river Ciliwung flows into the canal that channels flood water to Ancol Marina. It has been renovated recently.

== History ==
In 1902, together with his brother Tio Tek Tjoe, Tio Tek Hong established Toko Tio Tek Hong at Jalan Pasar Baru No. 93 in Passer Baroe at the heart of the fashionable Weltevreden neighbourhood. The Tio brothers came from a prominent family of the 'Tjabang Atas' gentry that counted among its members their much-older cousin Tio Tek Ho, the 4th Majoor der Chinezen of Batavia. The new business was one of the earliest modern department stores in Indonesia: it sold a wide range of merchandise labelled with non-negotiable fixed prices, an unusual practice at the time.

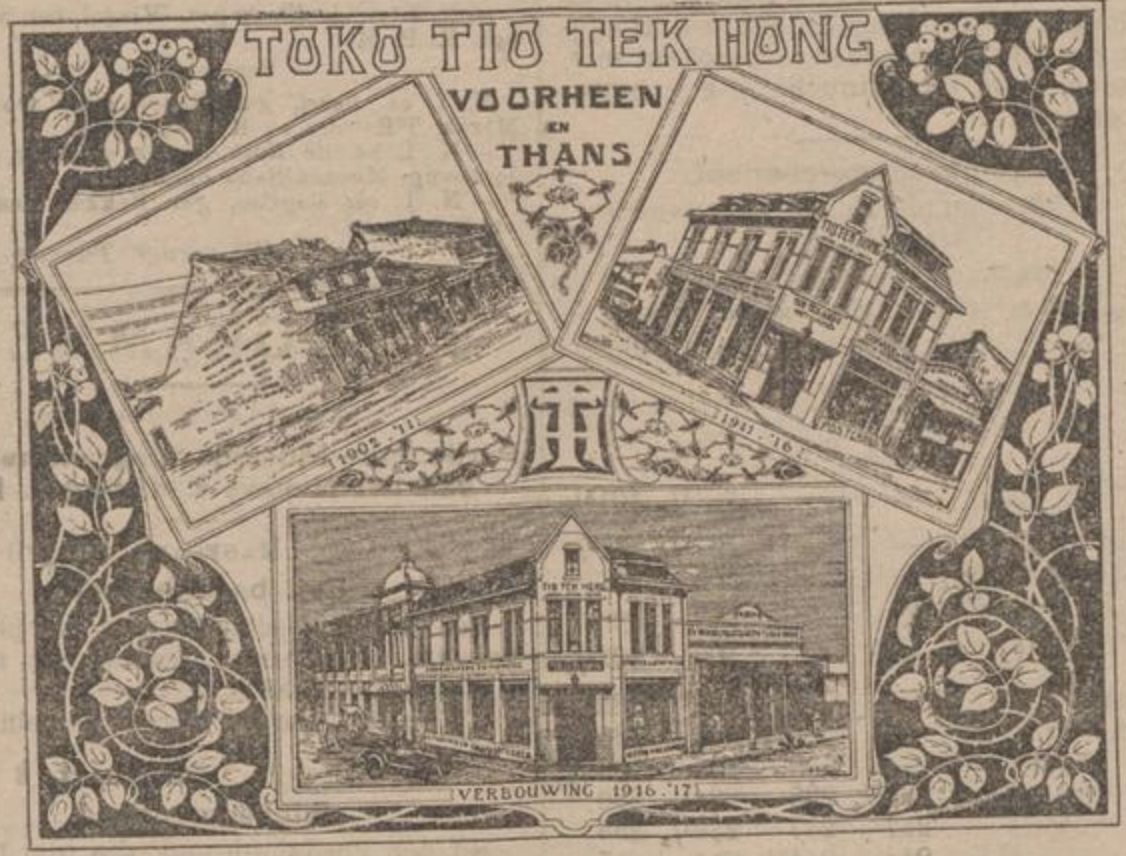
Toko Tio Tek Hong in 1902, 1911 and 1916

Toko Tio Tek Hong prospered and during the 1910s, the Tio brothers acquired adjoining land and twice rebuilt the department store, first in 1911, then again in 1916, inaugurating the present building in 1917 to coincide with the store's 15th anniversary. In 1927, the department store celebrated its 25th anniversary; the popular newspaper Nieuws van den Dag voor Nederlandsch-Indië declares:

"The firm was the first to have a large modern retail space, a pleasant change from shophouses and market sheds; its opening was an event in the history of the capital. What Tio Tek Hong has been to Batavians of tempo doeloe [former times] can best be seen from the fact that they used to say: 'If it is not available at Tio Tek Hong, then do not try it elsewhere. You won't get it anywhere."

However, the Tio family also borrowed money to make their property investment and was hit hard by the Great Depression of the early 1930s. Their business survived until perhaps the 1950s, but on a more modest scale.

Today, the building that used to house this pioneering department store has become a local historic landmark in modern-day Jakarta.

== Gallery ==
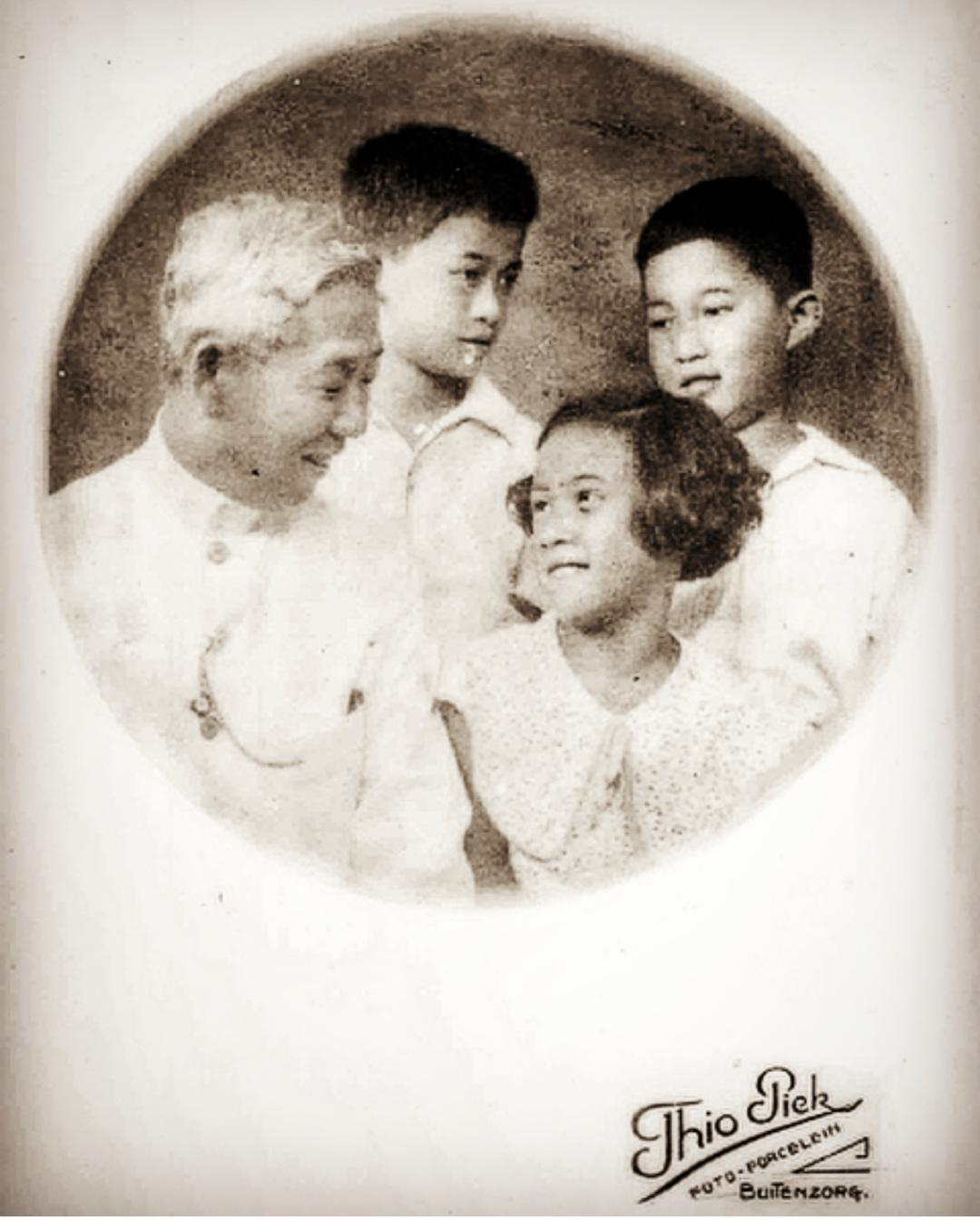
The businessman Tio Tek Hong with his family, mid-20th century.

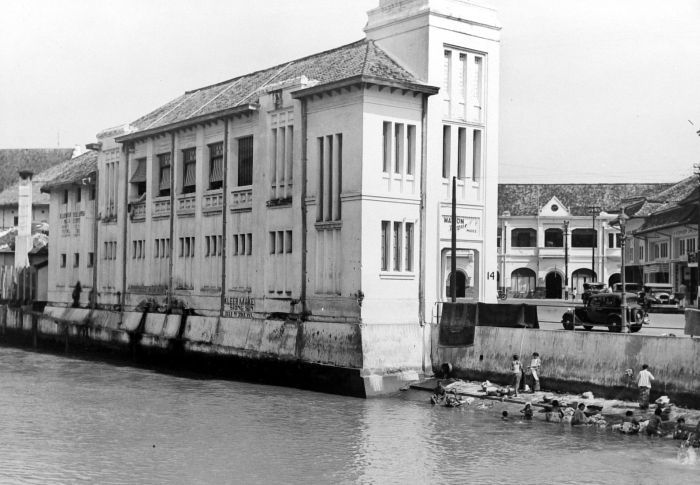
Canal view of the rear side of the building.

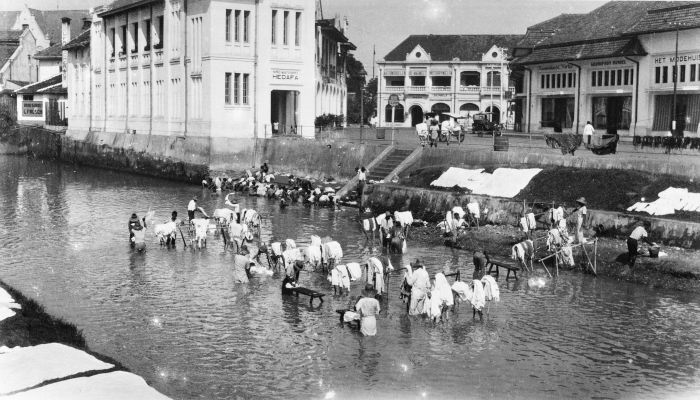
Another view focusing on a group of local cloth-washer in the canal.

== See also ==
- List of colonial buildings and structures in Jakarta
