= Phoa Beng Gan =

Chinese-Indonesian bureaucrat and engineer

Kapitein Phoa Beng Gan

3rd Kapitein der Chinezen of Batavia
- In office 1645–1663
- Preceded by: Kapitein Lim Lak Ko
- Succeeded by: Kapitein Gan Djie
- Constituency: Batavia

Personal details
- Occupation: Kapitein der Chinezen

Phoa Beng Gan, Kapitein der Chinezen, also called Bingam or Phoa Bing Gam (Chinese: 潘明岩; Pe̍h-ōe-jī: Phoaⁿ Bêng-gâm; pinyin: Pān Míngyán) in some early sources, was a Chinese-Indonesian bureaucrat and engineer, best known for his irrigation work in Batavia (now Jakarta, Indonesia). He served as the third Kapitein der Chinezen (or Chinese headman) of Batavia from 1645 to 1663, succeeding Kapitein Lim Lak Ko (Chinese: 林六哥; Pe̍h-ōe-jī: Lîm La̍k-ko; pinyin: Lín Liùgē).

== Appointment as Kapitein der Chinezen ==
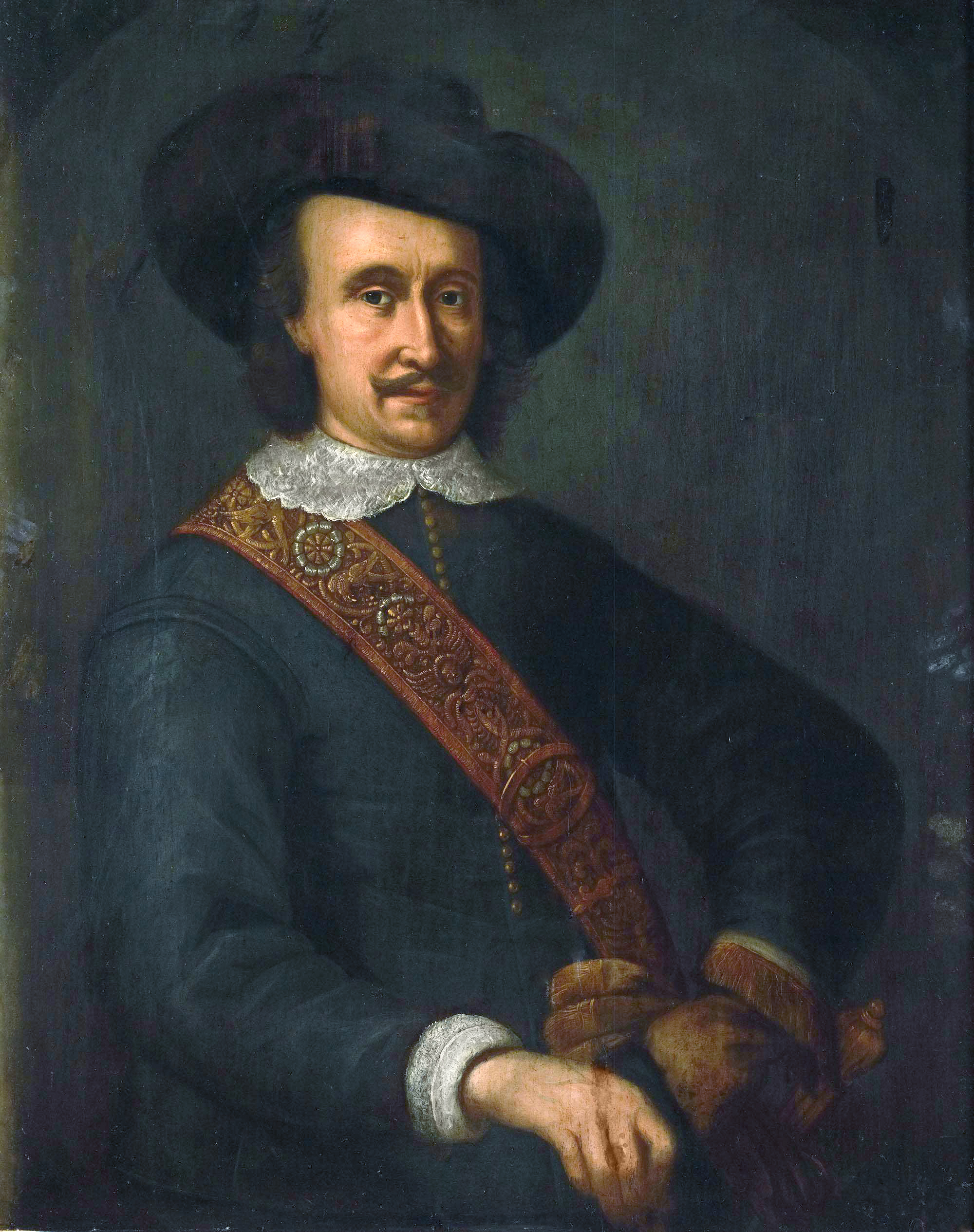
Cornelis van der Lijn, Governor-General at the start of Phoa's tenure.

According to the historian Phoa Kian Sioe, the impetus for Phoa Beng Gan's appointment as Kapitein der Chinezen in 1645 came from the local Chinese community of Batavia. Only then was this appointment subsequently approved by Cornelis van der Lijn, the 10th Governor-General under the Dutch East India Company.

Unlike his two predecessors, Kapitein Souw Beng Kong and Kapitein Lim Lak Ko, who were both wealthy merchant-mandarins, Phoa did not come from great wealth. As wealth was seen as an essential requirement for public office, the colonial authorities farmed out to Phoa the highly lucrative pacht or tax farm for surat konde or poll tax.

This tax was imposed upon the Company's Chinese subjects over the age of sixteen, and was payable to the colonial authorities through the new Kapitein who was entitled to a portion of the total amount. The tax was seen as onerous by the local Chinese community and, for a time, generated a great deal of ill will towards their chosen headman.

== Irrigation work ==
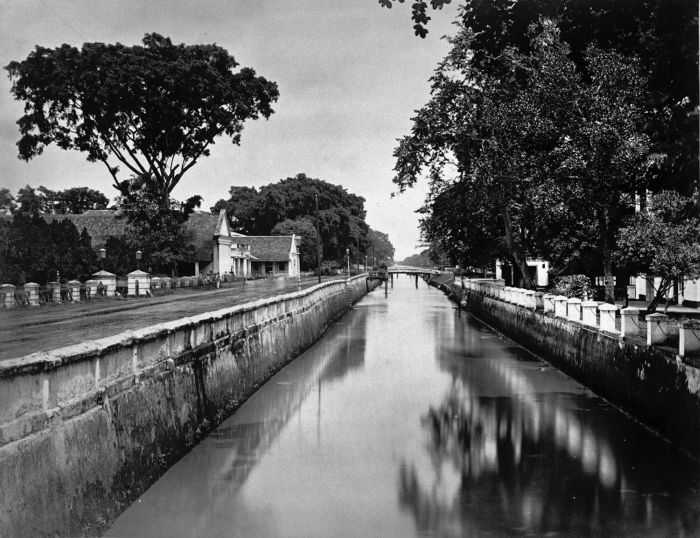
Phoa's Molenvliet canal in the late 19th century (Woodbury & Page).

Despite initial community ill will, Kapitein Phoa Beng Gan acquitted himself well as Chinese headman thanks to his irrigation work, for which he is best remembered today. Batavia in the mid-seventeenth century was prone to severe malaria outbreaks due to its surrounding swamps. The colonial authorities, however, did not have the necessary funds to drain the swamps due to expenditure elsewhere.

Kapitein Phoa Beng Gan organised for funds to be collected from the Chinese community to finance the draining of Batavia's swamps, and took charge of the project himself. To this end, he constructed a great canal to drain swamp water out of the city. Draining and construction work on the canal began in January 1648 and were completed by the end of the year.

The new canal not only drained the swamps around Batavia, but also served a vital economic role. It connected the city to the then agricultural area of Tanah Abang and beyond, and therefore functioned as a major transportation channel to supply the colonial capital with food produce and other resources from the hinterland. The canal was called Bingamvaart in honour of Kapitein Phoa Beng Gan. Later in 1661, the canal was rechristened Molenvliet - a name it was to retain until Independence.

Further irrigation work was needed, however, as the new canal dried up during the dry season, thus preventing its use as a transportation route. The Kapitein remedied this problem by extending the canal, through to what are now Jalan Djuanda and Jalan Veteran in Sawah Besar, in order to connect it to the Ciliwung river.

In recognition of the Kapitein's irrigation work, the colonial authorities granted him an estate (particuliere land) in Tanah Abang, where Phoa later cultivated sugar cane.

Government offices
Preceded by Kapitein Lim Lak Ko	Kapitein der Chinezen of Batavia; 1645–1663	Succeeded by Kapitein Gan Djie
