= Toko Kompak =

Coordinates: 6.164889°S 106.834570°E

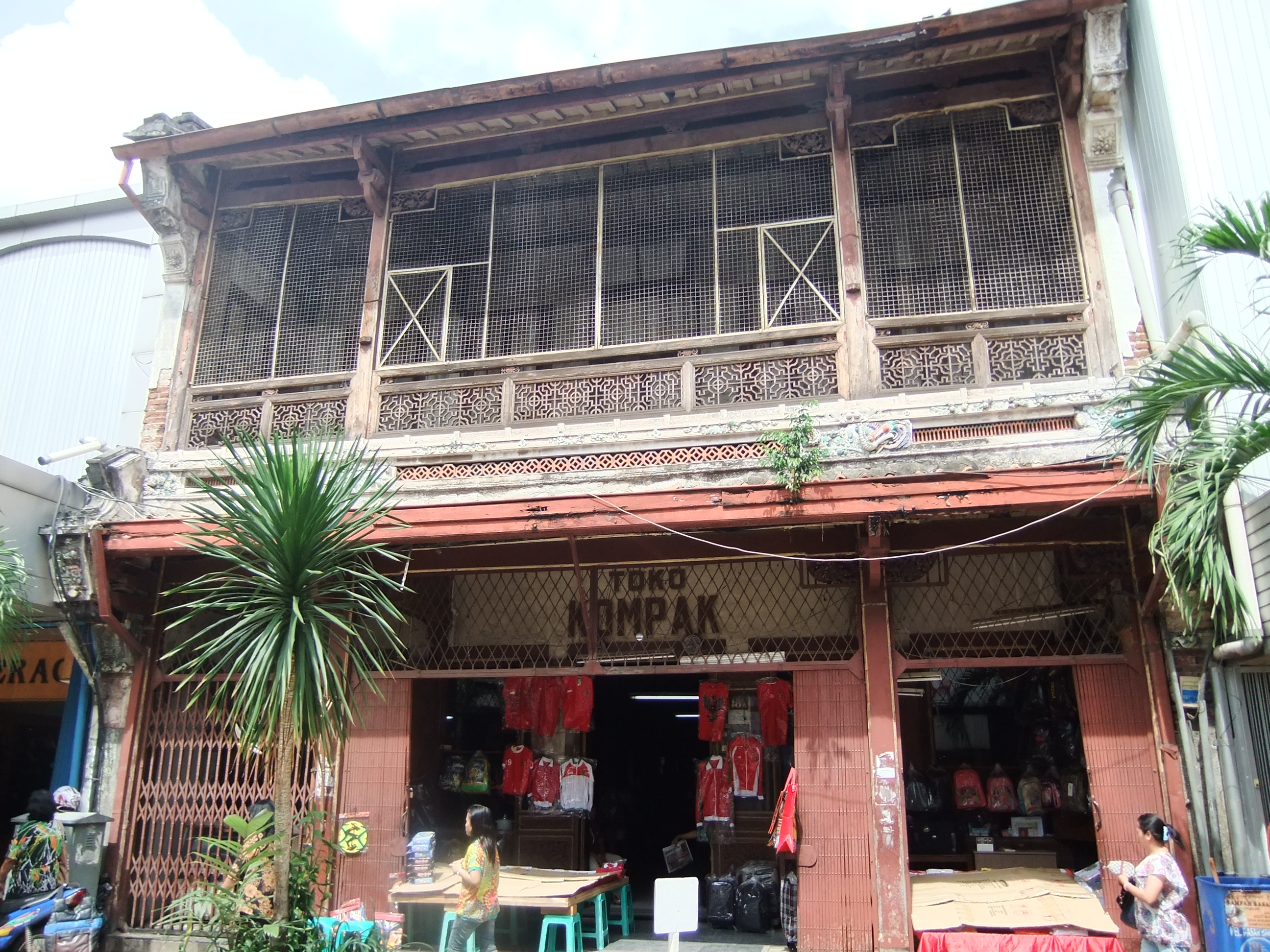
Toko Kompak, Pasar Baru

Toko Kompak is a historic landmark in Pasar Baru, Jakarta, Indonesia. It was the residence of Tio Tek Ho, Majoor der Chinezen (1896-1908), who was the penultimate head of the Chinese community in colonial Jakarta.

The building was probably built in the first half of the nineteenth century in a combination of Chinese, European and native Indonesian styles of architecture. At some point in the late colonial era, the residence was leased out and converted into a commercial store, called Sin Siong Bouw. After Independence in 1945, the name of the store was changed to Kompak.
