= Lie Tjoe Hong =

Chinese-Indonesian bureaucrat

Majoor Lie Tjoe Hong
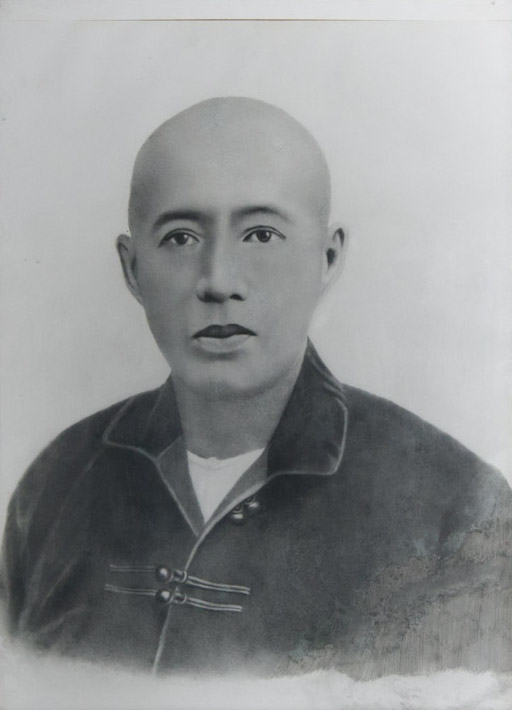
- Lie Tjoe Hong; 3rd Majoor der Chinezen of Batavia; Late 19th century (Leiden University)

Majoor der Chinezen of Batavia
- In office 18 February 1879 – 20 July 1896
- Preceded by: Majoor Tan Tjoen Tiat
- Succeeded by: Majoor Tio Tek Ho
- Constituency: Batavia

Personal details
- Born: 1846; Batavia, Dutch East Indies
- Died: 1896; Batavia, Dutch East Indies
- Relations: Kapitein Lie Tiang Ko (grandfather); Kapitein Lie Pek Tjiat (uncle); Luitenant Lie Pek Tat (uncle)
- Children: Kapitein Lie Tjian Tjoen (son); Aw Tjoei Lan (daughter-in-law); Hok Hoei Kan (son-in-law)
- Parent(s): Kapitein Lie Pek Thaij (father); Tan Swan Nio (mother)
- Occupation: Majoor der Chinezen, bureaucrat
- Awards: Gouden medaille voor verdiensten (Great Gold Star)

Lie Tjoe Hong, 3rd Majoor der Chinezen (Chinese: 李子凤; 1846–1896) was a Chinese-Indonesian bureaucrat who served as the third Majoor der Chinezen, or Chinese headman, of Batavia, now Jakarta, capital of Indonesia. This was the most senior Chinese position in the colonial civil bureaucracy of the Dutch East Indies. As Majoor, Lie was also the Chairman of the Chinese Council of Batavia (Dutch: Chinese Raad; Bahasa Indonesia: Kong Koan), the city's highest Chinese government body.

== Life ==
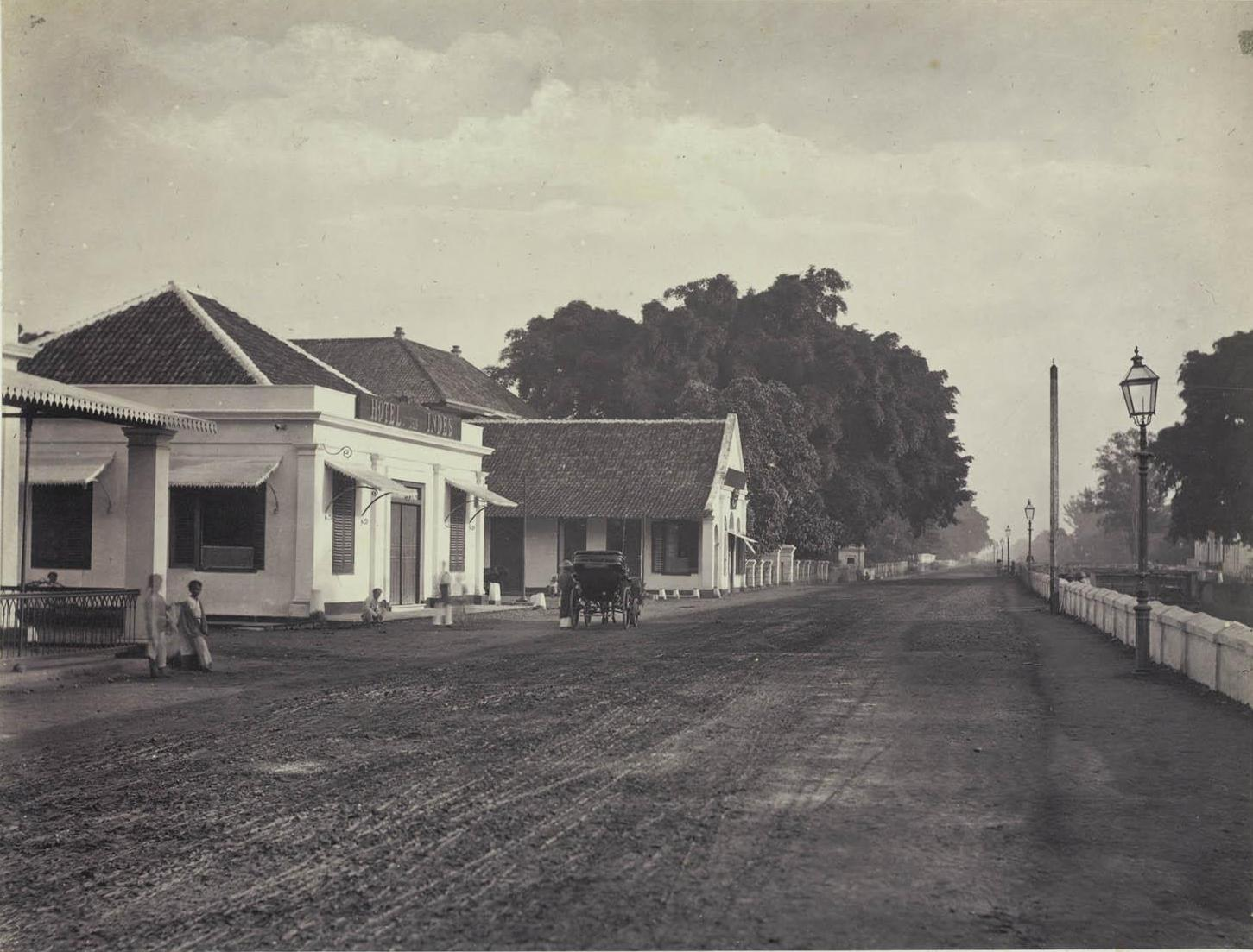
A photograph of Batavia in 1875 (a year before Lie's elevation to the Captaincy)

Lie Tjoe Hong Sia was born in 1846 in Batavia into the Lie family of Pasilian, an eminent landowning family of the 'Tjabang Atas' gentry with a tradition of public service. His father, Lie Pek Thaij (1809 - 1848), was an honorary Kapitein der Chinezen, while his grandfather, Lie Tiang Ko (1786 - 1855) had the rank of Luitenant-titulair der Chinezen (1847 - 1850), then Kapitein-titulair der Chinezen (1850 - 1855) under Tan Eng Goan, the first Majoor der Chinezen of Batavia. Two of Majoor Lie Tjoe Hong's uncles, Kapitein Lie Pek Tjiat and Luitenant Lie Pek Tat, were also as Chinese officers.

He bore the hereditary title 'Sia' as a descendant of Chinese officers. His own bureaucratic career began with an appointment as Luitenant der Chinezen of the outlying district of Lonthar Tanara in Banten from 1866 until 1869.

From 1872 until 1876, he served as Luitenant der Chinezen in Batavia under his predecessor, Tan Tjoen Tiat, the city's second Majoor der Chinezen. Lie Tjoe Hong was elevated to the higher post of Kapitein der Chinezen, which he held from 1876 until 1879. When Majoor Tan Tjoen Tiat retired from his post, Lie was appointed by the colonial government to succeed the former as third Majoor der Chinezen.

In February 1891, in recognition of the Majoor's 20 years of government service as a Chinese officer, he was awarded the Gold Medal of the Star for Loyalty and Merit by Royal Decree. Majoor Lie Tjoe Hong served in office until 20 July 1896, when he resigned.

Lie died six days after his resignation, and was buried in Grogol, Batavia.

His son, Kapitein Lie Tjian Tjoen (1886 - 1964), would continue the family tradition of public service, and served as both a Chinese officer and member of the Chinese Council. His daughter-in-law, Ny. Kapitein Lie Tjian Tjoen (born Aw Tjoei Lan), was a prominent philanthropist and founder of the charity organisation Ati Soetji. The Majoor's son-in-law, Hok Hoei Kan (1881 - 1951), was the most prominent politician of the centre-right political party Chung Hwa Hui (CHH) in the first half of the twentieth century, and served in the Volksraad (colonial parliament) of the Dutch East Indies.

Government offices
Preceded by Majoor Tan Tjoen Tiat	Majoor der Chinezen of Batavia; 1879–1896	Succeeded by Majoor Tio Tek Ho
