= Suikerbond =

The Suikerbond ("Sugar Union") was a trade union for European workers in the sugar industry in the Dutch East Indies. The organization was founded on 14 March 1907 in Surabaya, as the Bond van Geëmployeerden in de Suikerindustrie in Nederlandsch-Indië ("Union of those employed in the sugar industry in the Netherlands Indies"). One of the two strongest unions for Europeans, in the early 1920s, during a wave of strikes by factory workers (many of whom were organized in Communist trade unions), the Suikerbond had been "bought off" by the sugar industry which had raised wages for European workers. In 1921 the organization founded its own newspaper, De Indische Courant, which was run by the union's president, W. Burger, and appears in two editions on the island of Java; initially leaning social-democratic, under pressure from union members a more conservative editor in chief was installed. By 1922 the organization numbered over 3800 members and had a strike fund of a half a million guilders.
