= Aw Tjoei Lan =

Chinese-Indonesian philanthropist, community leader and social activist

- Born: February 17, 1889
- Died: December 19, 1965 (aged 76); Djakarta
- Other name: Njonja Kapitein Lie Tjian Tjoen
- Occupations: Social activist, philanthropist, community leader
- Years active: 1910s-1960s
- Known for: Women's rights activist, founder of Ati Soetji
- Spouse: Lie Tjian Tjoen, Kapitein der Chinezen (husband)
- Parent(s): Aw Seng Hoe, Luitenant der Chinezen (father); Tan An Nio (mother)
- Relatives: Lie Tjoe Hong, Majoor der Chinezen (father-in-law); Hok Hoei Kan (brother-in-law); Tan Tjin Kie, Majoor-titulair der Chinezen (cousin)

Aw Tjoei Lan, better known as Njonja Kapitein Lie Tjian Tjoen, sometimes spelt Auw Tjoei Lan, (February 17, 1889 – December 19, 1965) was a Chinese-Indonesian philanthropist, community leader, social activist and founder of the charity organization 'Ati Soetji' (EYD: 'Hati Suci'). Through her foundation, she fought against human trafficking and prostitution, and promoted education among orphans, in particular young girls.

== Early life ==
Aw Tjoei Lan was born in Majalengka, Dutch East Indies into the 'Cabang Atas' or Chinese gentry of Java. Her father, Aw Seng Hoe, was the Luitenant der Chinezen of Majalengka, serving as head of the Chinese civil bureaucracy in the district from 1886 until 1904. Her mother, Tan An Nio, was a first cousin of the well-known Tan Tjin Kie, Majoor-titulair der Chinezen, and came from an old landowning and bureaucratic clan, the Tan family of Cirebon.

Like many in her privileged background, Aw benefited from a Dutch education as her father invited a Dutch tutor from Batavia, capital of the Dutch East Indies, to teach her and her siblings. She subsequently attended a Dutch school in Buitenzorg, where she lodged at the house of a Dutch minister, a certain Rev. van Walsum. Aw also had an early exposure to philanthropy since her father was active in patronizing social causes in Majalengka.

== Marriage and social activism ==
Aw Tjoein Lan moved to Batavia upon her marriage, on March 2, 1907, to the bureaucrat Lie Tjian Tjoen, Kapitein der Chinezen, son of Lie Tjoe Hong, the 3rd Majoor der Chinezen of Batavia and a member of the influential and well-connected Lie family of Pasilian. Through her husband, Aw was also a sister-in-law of the late colonial statesman Hok Hoei Kan (whose wife was a sister of Kapitein Lie Tjian Tjoen).

It was through van Walsum that Aw met Dr. Zigman in Batavia. Together with D. van Hindeloopen Labberton and Soetan Temanggoeng, Dr. Zigman invited Aw to co-found and manage a new organization in 1912, called Ati Soetji, aimed at fighting the trafficking in Chinese women and children for prostitution and menial labor, and at giving them an education instead. Although met with initial resistance from various underworld organizations and entrenched interests, Aw persevered. She used her family's connections with the Dutch and Chinese colonial authorities, acquiring the patronage of the Governor-General, Johan Paul, Count of Limburg-Stirum and his wife, as well as the support of Khouw Kim An, 5th Majoor der Chinezen of Batavia.

Ati Soetji opened its first facility for girls, Tehuis voor Chineesche Meisjes ('Home for young Chinese women'), on October 17, 1917, at rented premises, followed in 1925 by a similar facility for young boys. In 1929, the foundation acquired its current headquarters in Kampung Bali, Tanah Abang, now in Central Jakarta. By the late 1930s, Ati Soetji had two orphanages, a refuge for former prostitutes, a facility for young women from poor families, a school and a dressmaking school.

On the recommendation of Majoor Khouw Kim An, Queen Wilhelmina of the Netherlands made Aw a Ridder in the Order of Orange-Nassau in September 1935. The award was granted to Aw personally by the Dutch prime minister, Hendrikus Colijn, on behalf of the queen.

In February 1937, representing the Dutch East Indies, Aw participated in the proceedings of the League of Nations in Bandung, West Java. In her speech, she advocated education for impoverished young women and girls to help them attain personal and professional independence as a safeguard against human trafficking. She also encouraged the rehabilitation of 'fallen women'.

The Japanese occupation of the Dutch East Indies from 1942 until 1945 during the Second World War marked a low point for both Ati Soetji and Aw herself. Together with other leaders of the colonial government, Aw's husband, Kapitein Lie Tjian Tjoen, was put in a concentration camp. Their family house at Jalan Kramat Raya 168, which at the time housed Ati Soetji's orphan boys, was confiscated by the Japanese. Aw arranged alternative lodgings for her charges, and ensured that the foundation's young women and girls were not taken by the Japanese as 'comfort women'. She rebuilt Ati Soetji's operations at the end of the war, thus ensuring the organization's survival to this day.

Aged 76, Aw Tjoei Lan died on September 19, 1965, in Djakarta, Indonesia. Her body lay in state at the headquarters of Ati Soetji before her burial at Petamburan.
