= Tan Tjoen Tiat =

Chinese-Indonesian bureaucrat

Majoor Tan Tjoen Tiat
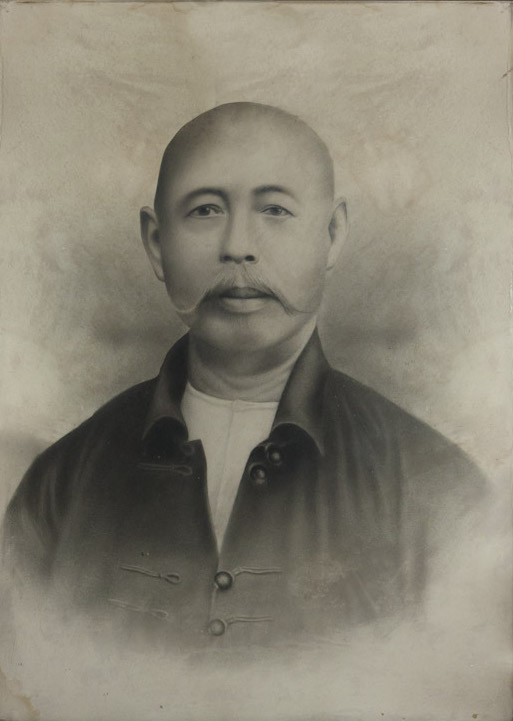
- Portrait of Tan Tjoen Tiat; 2nd Majoor der Chinezen of Batavia; Mid-19th century (Leiden University)

Majoor der Chinezen of Batavia
- In office 1865–1879
- Preceded by: Majoor Tan Eng Goan
- Succeeded by: Majoor Lie Tjoe Hong
- Constituency: Batavia

Personal details
- Born: 1816; Batavia, Dutch East Indies
- Died: 1880; Batavia, Dutch East Indies
- Spouse: Oey Tan Nio
- Relations: Kapitein Oey Eng Liok (father-in-law); Luitenant Souw Siauw Keng (son-in-law); Luitenant-titulair Oey Tiang Lam (son-in-law)
- Children: Tan Keng Soei, Luitenant-titulair der Chinezen (son); Tan Im Nio (daughter)
- Occupation: Majoor der Chinezen, bureaucrat

Tan Tjoen Tiat, 2nd Majoor der Chinezen (Chinese: 陳濬哲; pinyin: Chén Jùnzhé; 1816–1880) was a Chinese-Indonesian bureaucrat who served as the second Majoor der Chinezen, or Chinese headman, of Batavia, now Jakarta, capital of Indonesia. This was the most senior Chinese position in the colonial civil bureaucracy of the Dutch East Indies. As Majoor, Tan was also the Chairman of the Chinese Council of Batavia (Dutch: Chinese Raad; Indonesian: Kong Koan), the city's highest Chinese government body.

== Life ==
=== Background and early career ===
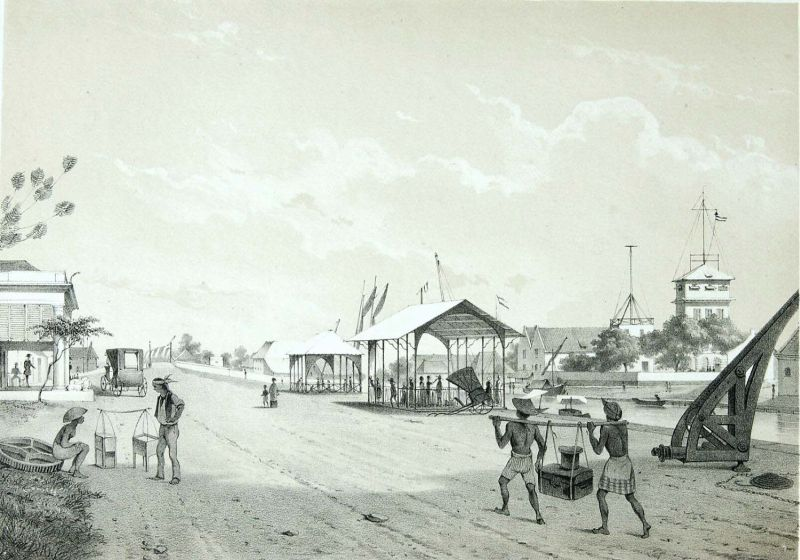
A litograph of Batavia, based on a drawing by C. Deeleman (1859).

Born in 1816 in Batavia into a Peranakan Chinese family, the names of Tan Tjoen Tiat's antecedents have been lost to posterity. His wife, Oey Tan Nio, is nonetheless recorded as the daughter of Kapitein Oey Eng Liok (appointed to his position in 1838), thus linking the future Majoor by marriage to the Cabang Atas aristocracy of colonial Indonesia.

In 1850, during the mayoralty of his predecessor Majoor Tan Eng Goan (the first to hold the mayoral office in Batavia), Tan Tjoen Tiat was himself raised to the Chinese officer class as a Luitenant. This was the most junior rank in the Chinese officership, part of the civil bureaucracy of the Dutch East Indies.

Despite having the same surname as Majoor Tan Eng Goan, the two Tans were not related. Indeed, Luitenant Tan Tjoen Tiat did not hide his disappointment in the Majoor's meek handling of the scandalous case of the playboy Oey Tamba Sia (1827–1856).

Later in the 1860s, the future second Majoor purchased his financially troubled predecessor's particuliere landen or private domains of Kramat and Kapoek in the Ommelanden (rural hinterland) of Batavia.

=== Mayoralty ===
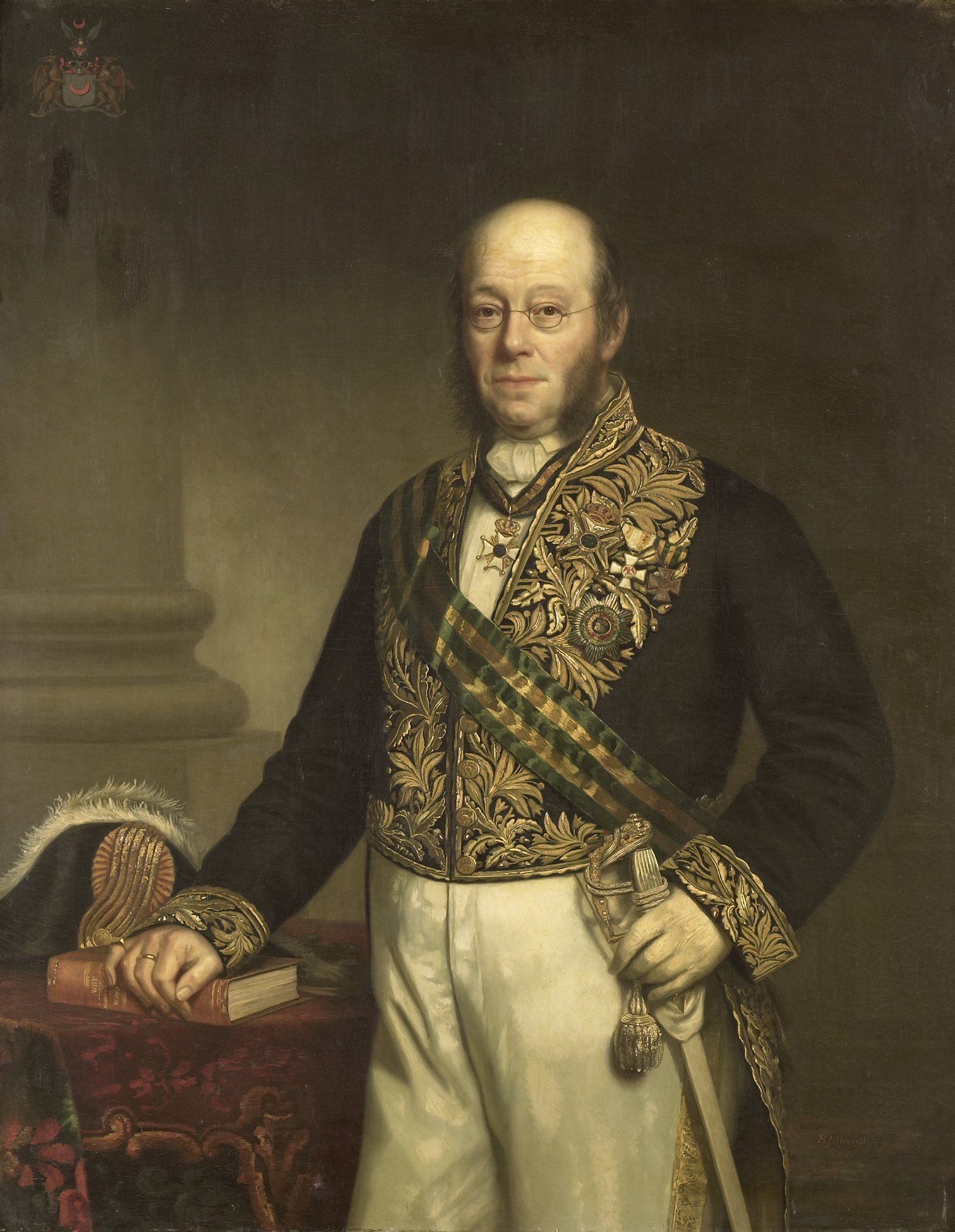
Baron Sloet van de Beele (1806–1890), Governor-General at the time of Tan's elevation to the post of Majoor in 1865.

In 1865, after 15 years of service as an officer, Luitenant Tan Tjoen Tiat was raised to the rank his father-in-law had held, that of Kapitein.

That same year, upon the resignation of the first Majoor, Kapitein Tan Tjoen Tiat was appointed by Ludolph Anne Jan Wilt, Baron Sloet van de Beele, the 19th Governor-General, to succeed as the second Majoor der Chinezen of Batavia. This mayoral elevation went against existing tradition, which favoured the longest-serving Kapiteins from long-established officer families, and thus showed the confidence in which the colonial government held the new Majoor.

In 1870, a colonial government commission was formed, consisting of the civil servant Maximilian von Faber, the Majoor and Kapitein Ko Se Tjoan. Their task was to determine whether a woman, as a widow or a mother, may act as a guardian for minors under Chinese law. All three answered in the negative, with von Faber assigning the responsibility of custodianship to the Boedelkamer, or Estate Chamber; and the two Chinese officers, to a respected male relative of the minors.

Tan served in office until 1879, when he asked for, and was granted by the colonial government, an honourable discharge from his position. Allowed nonetheless to retain his mayoralty on an honorary, titular basis, the former second Majoor died a year after his resignation in 1880, and was buried at his family mausoleum in Gaboes.

His son, Luitenant-titulair der Chinezen Tan Keng Soei, was married to a niece of Kapitein Ko Se Tjoan and Kapitein Ko Tjoen Kiat. His daughter, Tan Im Nio, was married to Luitenant Souw Siauw Keng, son of Luitenant Souw Tian Pie. Another daughter married Luitenant-titulair Oey Tiang Lam, son of Oey Ing Soan, Kapitein der Chinezen of Tegal in Central Java.

Government offices
Preceded by Majoor Tan Eng Goan	Majoor der Chinezen of Batavia; 1865–1879	Succeeded by Majoor Lie Tjoe Hong
