= De Indische Courant =

Dutch newspapers published in Indonesia

De Indische Courant was the name of a number of Dutch language newspapers published on the island of Java in the Dutch East Indies (modern-day Indonesia).

== Early newspapers ==
The first paper under this name was published in 1870 (in the classification of the International Institute of Social History, De Indische Courant I), in Batavia. A newspaper of the same name was published in Batavia from 1896 to 1900 (De Indische Courant II); this paper, one of whose contributors was Dutch author and critic of the colonial system Multatuli, was continued as the Nieuws van den Dag voor Nederlandsch-Indië. The most important paper published as De Indische Courant ran from 1921 to 1942: an East-Java edition was published in Surabaya (Indische Courant III, 1921–1942), and a West-Java edition, published in Weltevreden, ran from 1922 to 1939 (Indische Courant IV). The last paper under this name ran from 1949 to 1952 (Indische Courant V), again from Batavia.

== De Indische Courant (1921–1942) ==
In 1921 the Suikerbond, a conservative trade union representing the interests of "European workers in the sugar industry", founded De Indische Courant, published first in Surabaya, East-Java, and then also from Weltevreden, West-Java. From the beginning, the publishers were in conflict with Aneta, the Dutch news agency (partly financed by the Dutch government) which brought international news to the islands via telegraph and thus greatly improved and simplified the news gathering done up to that point by the local papers themselves. The contracts (wurgcontracten, or "strangle contracts") Aneta signed with these papers, however, were frequently seen as restrictive; for example, the agency required papers to buy and distribute its own newsletter, De Zweep ("The Whip"), in which Aneta's founder settled personal scores by fulminating under the pseudonym Jan Karwats ("John the Scourge"). In addition, embedded conflicts of interest between the agency and the Dutch government meant that criticism was frequently stifled. De Indische Courant refused to bundle its paper with De Zweep, and was cut out of the telegraph service, a problem solved by the paper's owner, W. Burger (also president of the Suikerbond), through the acquisition of a radio. When the government imposed severe restriction on the freedom of the press (1927–1931) citing the threat of Communist uprisings, such as the one in 1926, De Indische Courant was one of the measure's most vocal opponents.

Like other Dutch newspapers in the colonies, its function was to amuse rather than opine, and its content consisted for a large part of gossip, rumor, and sensationalist news items (sometimes bordering on libel). Critique of the Dutch government was rarely printed. While the paper leaned social-democratic in the 1920s, under pressure from union members editor in chief Koch was replaced by Willem Belonje and became much more conservative. Economist J. C. van Leur published a number of articles on financial and economical policies in the 1930s, strongly supportive of economic intervention by the colonial government. By 1938 De Indische Courant (then published from Surabaya) tied The Java-Bode (published in Batavia) for the largest circulation in the colonies, 7000 copies.
