= Tio Tek Ho =

Chinese bureaucrat in the Dutch East Indies

Majoor Tio Tek Ho
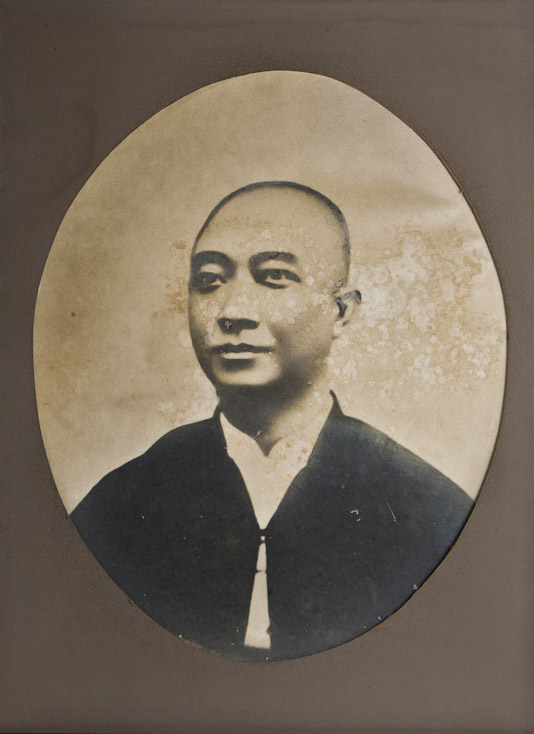
- Tio Tek Ho; 4th Majoor der Chinezen of Batavia; Late 19th century (Leiden University)

Kapitein der Chinezen of Pasar Baroe
- In office 1892–1896
- Preceded by: Kapitein Loa Tiang Hoei
- Constituency: Pasar Baroe, Batavia

Majoor der Chinezen of Batavia
- In office 1896–1907
- Preceded by: Majoor Lie Tjoe Hong
- Succeeded by: Majoor Khouw Kim An
- Constituency: Batavia

Personal details
- Born: 1857; Batavia, Dutch East Indies
- Died: 1908; Batavia, Dutch East Indies
- Relations: Kapitein Tio Tek Soen (brother); Tio Him (grandfather); Tio Tek Hong (cousin); Kapitein Loa Tiang Hoei (cousin-in-law)
- Children: Luitenant Tio Wie Han (son)
- Parent: Tio Tjeng Soey (father)
- Occupation: Majoor der Chinezen, bureaucrat

Tio Tek Ho, 4th Majoor der Chinezen (Chinese: 趙德和; pinyin: Zhào Déhé; Pe̍h-ōe-jī: Tiō Tek-hô; 1857 - 1908) was an ethnic Chinese bureaucrat in the Dutch East Indies who served as the fourth and penultimate Majoor der Chinezen or Chinese headman of Batavia, now Jakarta, capital of Indonesia. This was the most senior position in the Chinese officership, which constituted the Chinese arm of the civil bureaucracy in the Dutch East Indies. As Majoor, Tio was also the ex officio Chairman of the Chinese Council of Batavia (Dutch: Chinese Raad; Bahasa Indonesia: Kong Koan), the city's highest Chinese government body.

Tio's tenure saw the founding of the influential, reformist Confucian organisation Tiong Hoa Hwee Koan in 1900, with which he had an uneasy relationship despite officially extending his mayoral patronage to the group. This was part of a broader modernising movement in the local Chinese community, which questioned the role of the traditional Chinese leadership and institutions in colonial Indonesia.

== Family background and business life ==
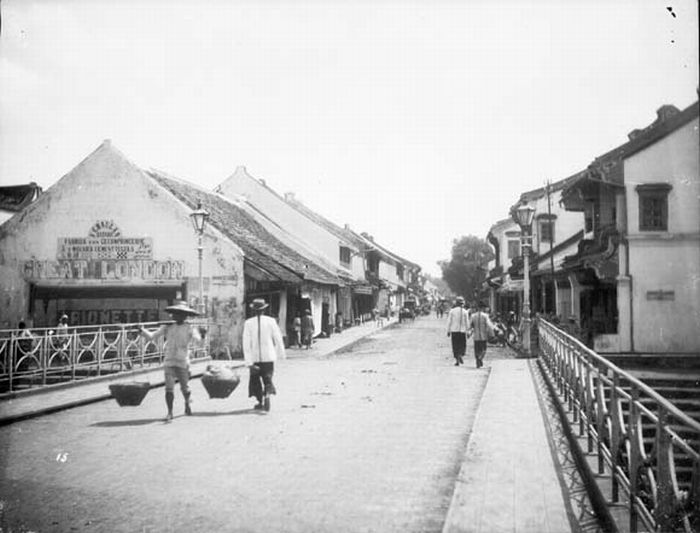
Pasar Baroe in the late 19th century

Born in 1858 in the then prestigious district of Pasar Baroe, Batavia, Tio Tek Ho was a third-generation, locally-born Peranakan Chinese. He came from a long-established and wealthy family of merchants: both Tio's father Tio Tjeng Soey and grandfather Tio Him were prominent businessmen in the Dutch colonial capital.

As director, Tio Tek Ho headed his late father's business, Erven Tio Tjeng Soey, which owned a notable, general trading store in Pasar Baroe. In addition, he also had other commercial interests, including in rice trading, pawn houses and a cement factory in Angke, called Ned-Ind. Cement-Onderneming Bintang.

This business background differentiated Tio from his three mayoral predecessors, each of whom was a landheer (landlord) and either the son or son-in-law of a Chinese officer. The second half of the nineteenth century, however, saw the social ascent of the Tio family: they married into officer families and became part of the so-called 'Cabang Atas' or the local Chinese gentry of colonial Indonesia.

Tio's uncle, Tio Tjeng Sioe, was married to Lie Loemoet Nio, a first cousin of his mayoral predecessor, Lie Tjoe Hong, the third Majoor der Chinezen of Batavia (1846–1896). Tio's first cousin, Tio Biet Nio, was married to Loa Tiang Hoei, Tio's predecessor in his earlier appointment as Kapitein der Chinezen of Pasar Baroe. Three of Tio's own siblings also married into the Cabang Atas.

The future Majoor's main family residence in Batavia, Toko Kompak, is a sumptuous testimony to his family's social ascent and prominence, and is now an important local landmark in Jakarta.

== Bureaucratic career ==
In February 1886, Tio became the first in his family to be elevated to the Chinese officership with his appointment as a Luitenant der Chinezen, the most junior rank in the officer hierarchy. In 1890, Tio was further raised to the post of Kapitein der Chinezen of Pasar Baroe and a member of the Chinese Council in succession to his cousin-in-law, Kapitein Loa Tiang Hoei.

Part of Tio's role as a Chinese officer was not only to provide leadership to the local Chinese community, but also to represent them to other sections of colonial Indonesian society, especially the Dutch elite. In November 1892, for example, Kapitein Tio Tek Ho delivered a well-received talk on Confucian philosophy in 'onberispelijk Nederlandsch' ('flawless Dutch') to one of the Masonic lodges in Batavia, 'de Ster in het Oosten' (the 'Star of the East'). In 1893, together with Kapitein Loa Tiang Hoei as president, Tio also became the secretary of a new foundation to manage the Kongsie Huis of Pasar Baroe, the district's oldest and most prestigious Chinese temple.

Tio's conduct as a member of the Chinese Council earned him the favour of the Dutch colonial authorities, in particular − according to the historian Mona Lohanda − because of his decision to distance himself from the Council's questionable land acquisitions under Majoor Lie Tjoe Hong. The previous Majoor, a landlord who owned extensive particuliere landerijen (private domains), used his influence to cajole the Council to purchase some of his landholdings. While most Chinese officers in the Council cowered and acquiesced in the Majoor's demand, Tio disassociated himself from these acquisitions.

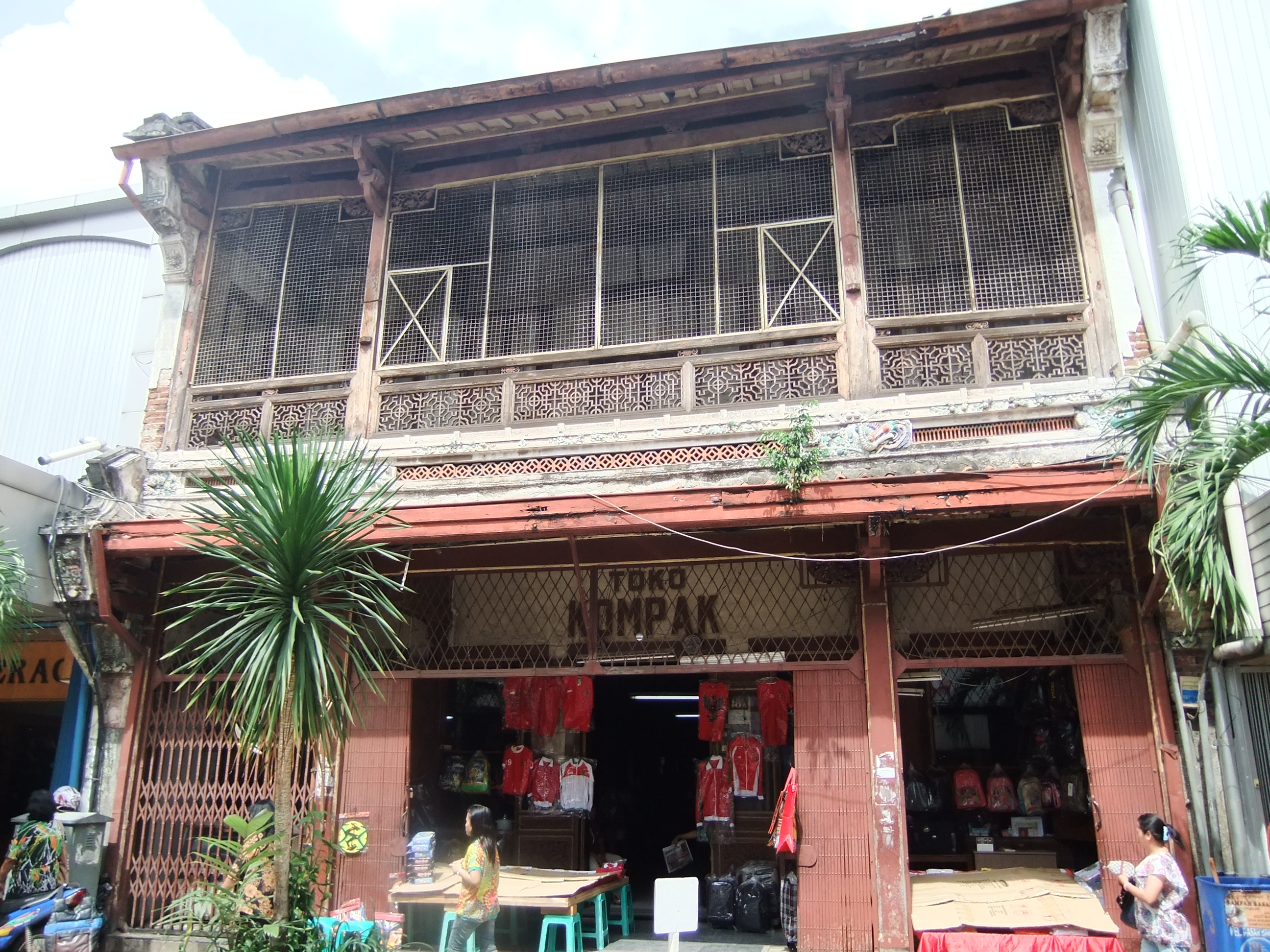
Toko Kompak, formerly the family residence of Majoor Tio Tek Ho

In July 1896, when Majoor Lie Tjoe Hong resigned, Kapitein Tio Tek Ho became a leading contender to the Chinese Mayoralty thanks to his uncompromising attitude in the land acquisition saga. By tradition, the Dutch colonial authorities would normally appoint as Majoor the longest-serving Kapitein der Chinezen in the Chinese Council, but most of the Council's members had been implicated in the outgoing Majoor's questionable behaviour. In October 1896, therefore, Tio was installed in office at the premises of the Chinese Council as the fourth and penultimate Majoor der Chinezen of Batavia. After the ceremony, the new Majoor hosted a reception at his residence in Pasar Baroe, and delivered a speech on good administration and governance.

By the start of the twentieth century, however, Majoor Tio Tek Ho was considered to be a conservative traditionalist by more progressive community leaders, the so-called jong Chineesche partij (the young Chinese party). This tension was managed by one of the progressive leaders, Phoa Keng Hek, who tactfully requested Majoor Tio Tek Ho in 1900 to act as the ex-officio Beschermheer (or Patron) of the new modernising organisation Tiong Hoa Hwee Koan (THHK). The organisation sought to purify the practice of Confucianism in the Dutch East Indies, and to provide modern schools for the Chinese community. Majoor Tio Tek Ho accepted the position of Beschermheer of THHK, thus beginning the long association between the Chinese Mayoralty and the new organisation.

The writer Kwee Tek Hoay highlights, however, that the underlying tension between the penultimate Majoor and THHK was finally exposed by a case of corruption within the Chinese Council in 1907. The executive board of THHK had earlier discovered some financial chicanery on the part of Nie Liang Soei, the Majoor's righthand man and Second Secretary of the Chinese Council. While the case only involved the small sum of 400 guilders, THHK reported it on principle to the colonial authorities, leading to the dismissal of Nie Liang Soei. The Majoor, who had requested a discharge due to old age a few months prior to the scandal, was not involved in the corruption, but ended his tenure in 1907 in what many viewed as rather shameful circumstances.

Soon after his resignation, the former Majoor died in January 1908. He was succeeded eventually in 1910 by the son-in-law of the progressive Phoa Keng Hek, Khouw Kim An, the fifth and last Majoor der Chinezen of Batavia.

Government offices
Preceded by Majoor Lie Tjoe Hong	Majoor der Chinezen of Batavia; 1896–1907	Succeeded by Majoor Khouw Kim An
