= Souw Beng Kong =

Chinese-born Indonesian civil servant

Kapitein Souw Beng Kong
- 蘇鳴崗
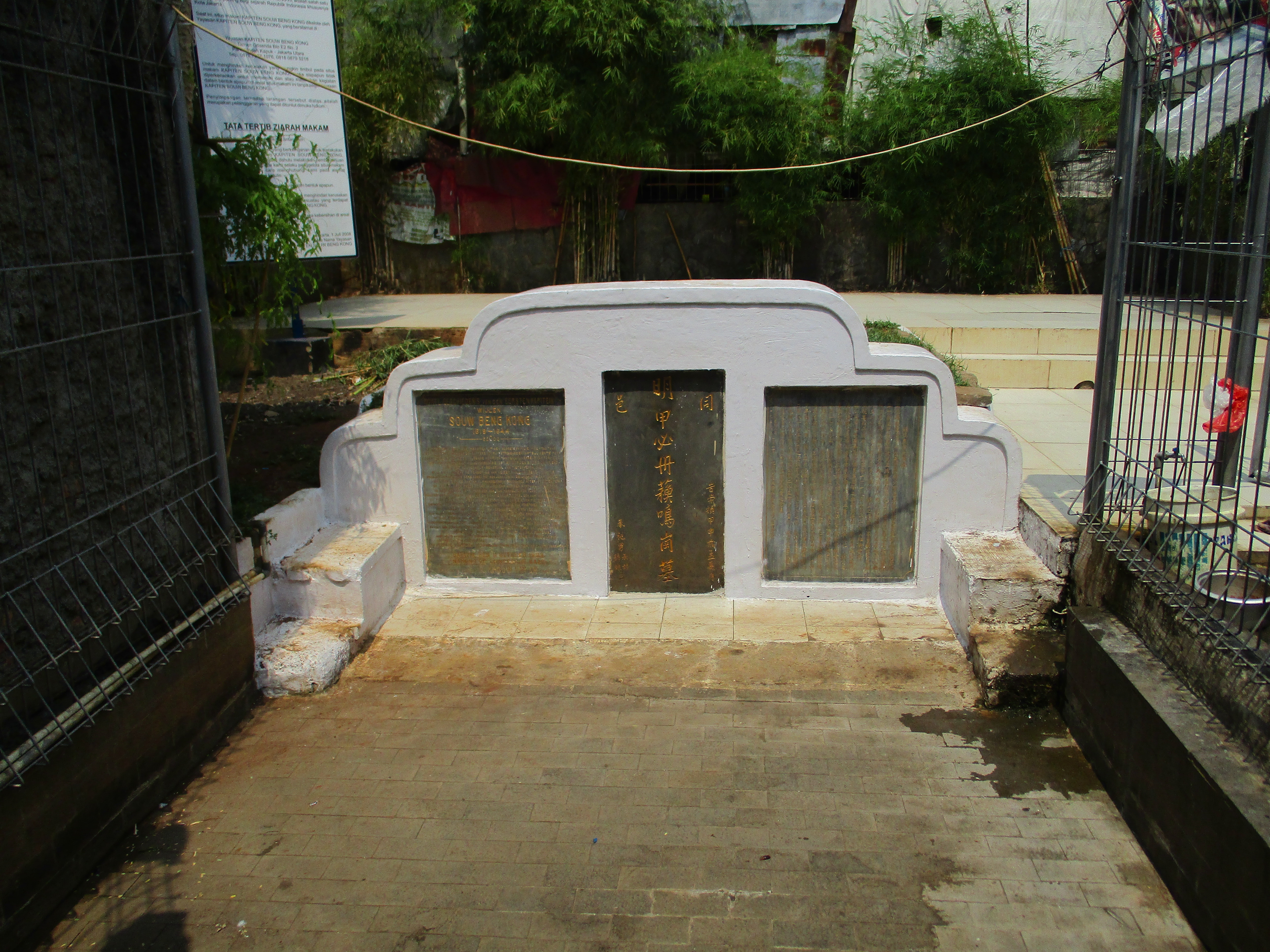
- Tomb of Souw Beng Kong in Jakarta.

1st Kapitein der Chinezen of Batavia
- In office 1619–1636
- Preceded by: New creation
- Succeeded by: Kapitein Liem Lak Ko
- Constituency: Batavia

Personal details
- Born: c. 1580; Tong An, Fujian, Ming Empire
- Died: 1644 (aged 63–64); Batavia, Dutch East Indies
- Occupation: Kapitein der Chinezen

Souw Beng Kong, 1st Kapitein der Chinezen (traditional Chinese: 蘇鳴崗; simplified Chinese: 苏鸣岗; Pe̍h-ōe-jī: So͘ Bêng-kong; pinyin: Sū Mínggǎng; c. 1580–1644), called Bencon in older Dutch sources, was an ally of the Dutch East India Company and the first Kapitein der Chinezen of Batavia, capital of colonial Indonesia. This was the most senior Chinese position in the colonial civil bureaucracy with legal and political jurisdiction over the local Chinese community in the colony.

== Life ==
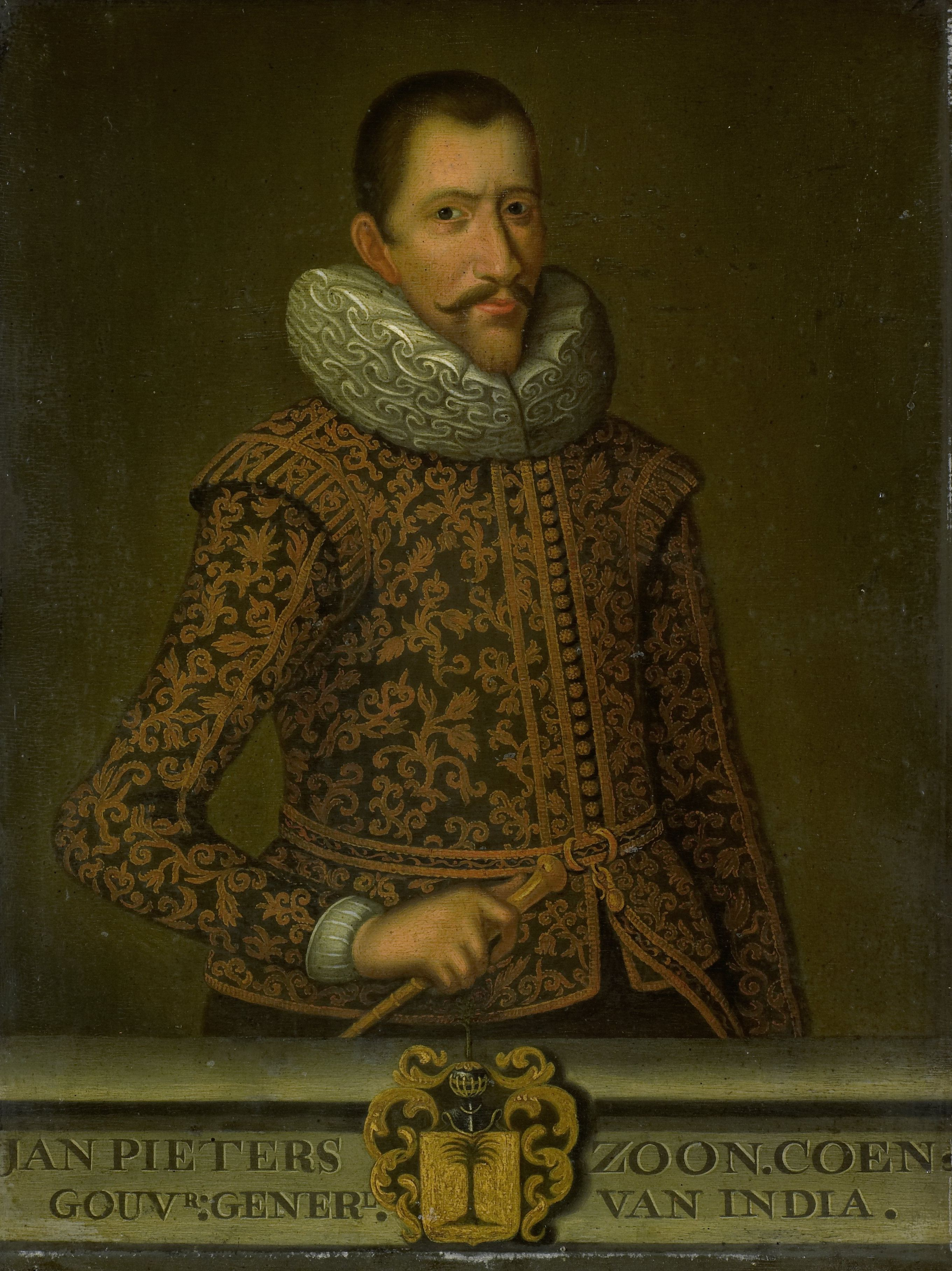
Jan Pieterszoon Coen, Souw's patron and Governor-General of the Dutch East Indies.

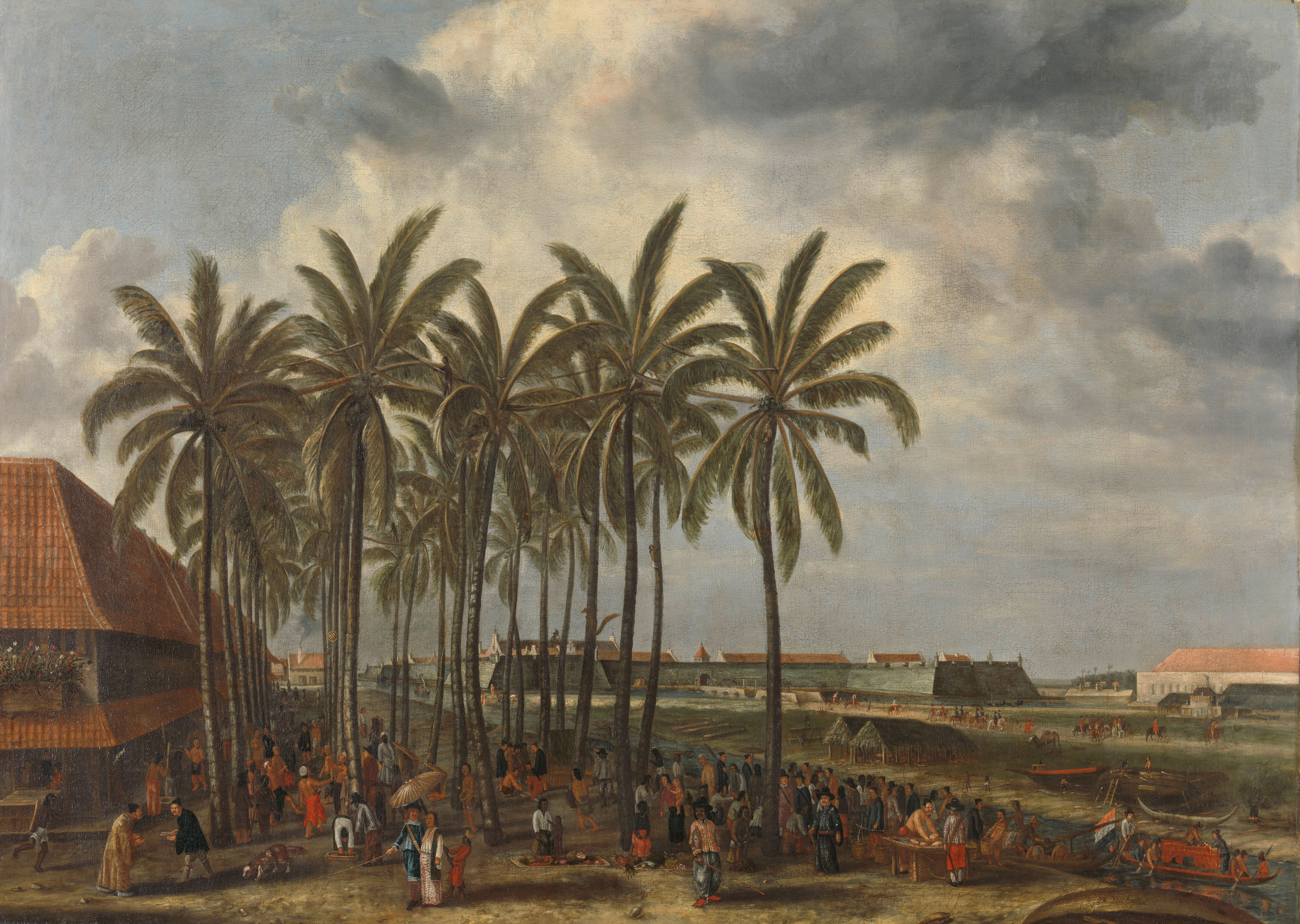
A panorama of Batavia in Souw's time by Andries Beeckman

Souw Beng Kong was born in Tong'an, Fujian around 1580, during the Ming Dynasty. By the beginning of the seventeenth century, he had established himself as a leading magnate and merchant in the port city of Banten on the north coast of Java. He was appointed by Pangeran Ratu, Sultan of Banten (1596–1647) as the Kapitan Cina, or Chinese headman, of Banten. In the conflict between the Sultan and the Dutch East India Company, however, Souw sided with the company.

He developed a cordial relationship with Jan Pieterszoon Coen, the fourth Governor-General of the Dutch East Indies (1587-1629). When Coen moved the Dutch headquarters from Banten to the newly conquered city of Jayakarta (later renamed Batavia), the Governor-General asked Souw to relocate to the new Dutch capital. Souw played an important role in consolidating Dutch rule in Batavia by encouraging the settlement of Chinese migrants, starting with 170 Chinese families from Banten. The Company appointed Souw as Kapitein der Chinezen of Batavia with political and legal authority over the local Chinese community.

This system formed part of the Dutch colonial system of ‘Indirect Rule’. Similar posts were created for leaders of other ethnic groups in Batavia, such as the Bugis, the Balinese, the Makassarese, the Indians and the Papangers. Interethnic relations were close. Kapitein Souw Beng Kong is recorded to have had two Balinese wives who gave birth to two sons.

Beyond his role as Kapitein, Souw Beng Kong was also given the authority to mint coins and print money and the license to tax gambling in Batavia. He also developed trade links between Dutch Formosa (Taiwan) and Batavia towards the end of the Ming Dynasty. Souw resigned his captaincy in 1636 after 17 years in office.

Kapitein Souw Beng Kong died in 1644. As proven by his tomb, which refers to the Ming dynasty, Souw was a lifelong Ming loyalist.

== Tomb ==
The tomb of Kapitein Souw Beng Kong is one of the oldest historic sites of the colonial period in Jakarta, Indonesia. It is located in Mangga Dua Selatan, Central Jakarta, in what was then the outskirts of the old colonial capital.

The then derelict tomb was first restored during the mayoralty of Souw's last colonial successor, Majoor Khouw Kim An (in office: 1910–1918, 1927–1945), who also added a commemorative plaque. After decades of abandonment and neglect, the tomb was restored between 2006 and 2008 by a group led by MATAKIN (Supreme Council for the Confucian Religion in Indonesia) and Trisakti University.

Government offices
Preceded by New creation	Kapitein der Chinezen of Batavia; 1619–1636	Succeeded by Kapitein Liem Lak Ko
