= Nieuws van den Dag voor Nederlandsch-Indië =

Former newspaper in Dutch East Indies

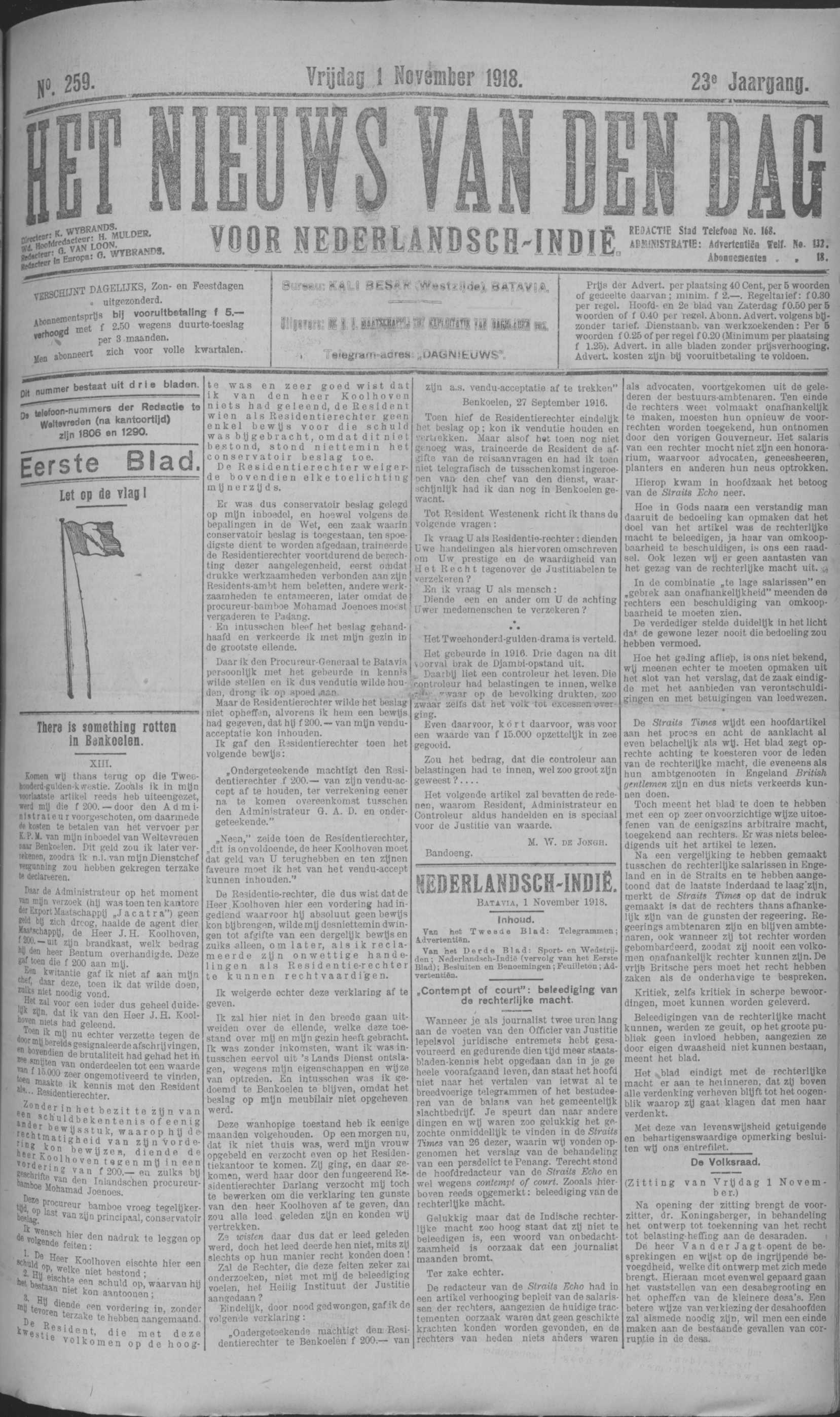
Front page of Het nieuws van den dag voor Nederlandsch-Indië from November 1, 1918

Het Nieuws van den Dag voor Nederlandsch-Indië ('The News of the Day for the Dutch East Indies') was a Dutch-language newspaper published on the island of Java in the Dutch East Indies (modern-day Indonesia). Originally called De Indische Courant (one of a number of papers with that name), it was published in Batavia from 1895 or 1896 to 1900 until it was renamed. One of the paper's contributors was Dutch author and critic of the colonial system Multatuli.

The paper was known as conservative, and editorialized vehemently against the emancipation of the native people. Its editor in chief during the 1920s was K.W. Wybrands, who put such a personal stamp on the paper that it was also known as Wybrands' paper. In 1938, Willem Belonje became the editor in chief of the paper; he had earlier run De Indische Courant, in the 1920s. The paper was closed in 1942 by the Japanese occupying forces. In the early 1930s the paper had a circulation of six to nine thousand, but had dropped to between three and six thousand the next decade.
