= List of Kapitan Cina =

This is a list of individuals who held the post of Kapitan Cina, a government position that existed in colonial Indonesia, Malaysia, Singapore, and the Philippines. The role came with vastly varying degrees of power, depending on historical and local circumstances: from near-sovereign authority with legal, political and military powers to an honorary title for a community leader.

== Kapitan Cina in the Residency of Batavia (Greater Jakarta, Indonesia) ==
The Majoors der Chinezen of Batavia
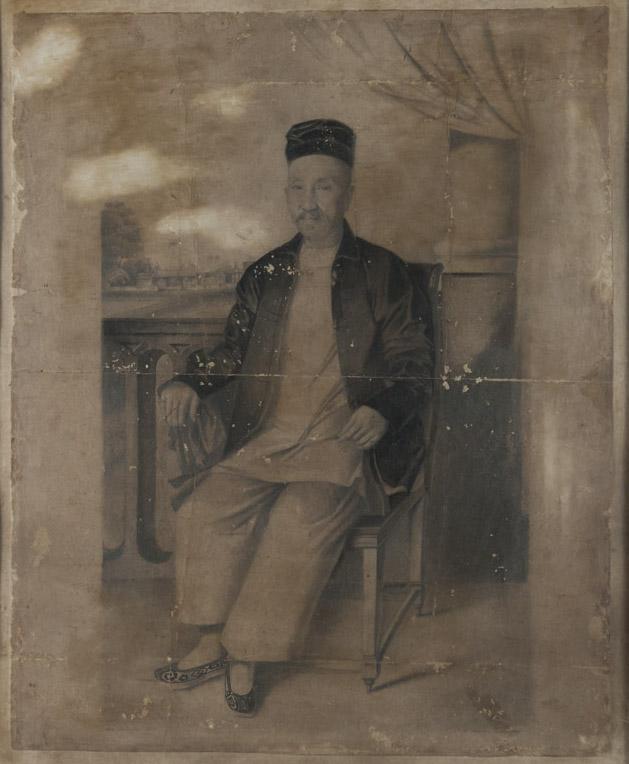
Tan Eng Goan, 1st Majoor der Chinezen of Batavia (1802–1872)

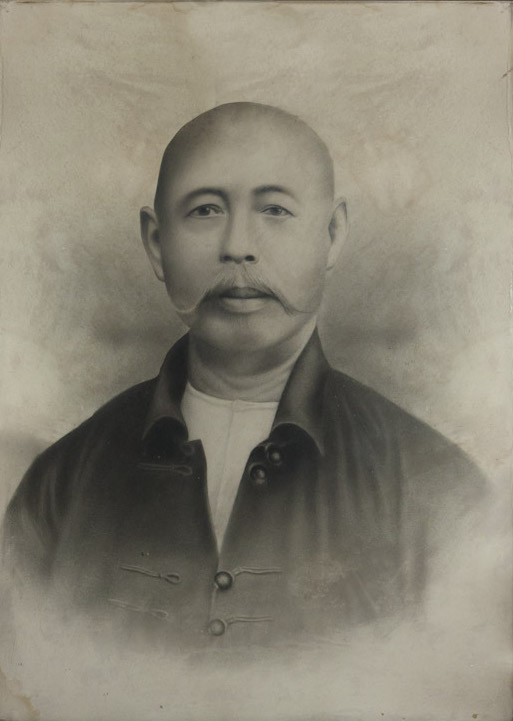
Tan Tjoen Tiat, 2nd Majoor der Chinezen of Batavia (1816–1880)

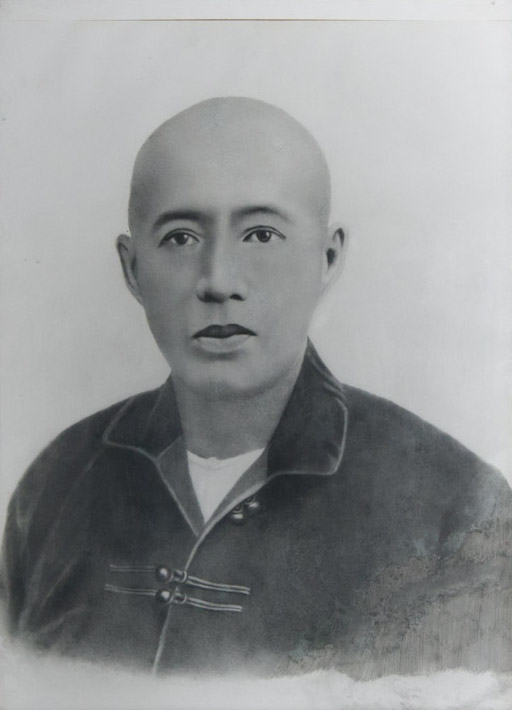
Lie Tjoe Hong, 3rd Majoor der Chinezen of Batavia (1846–1896)

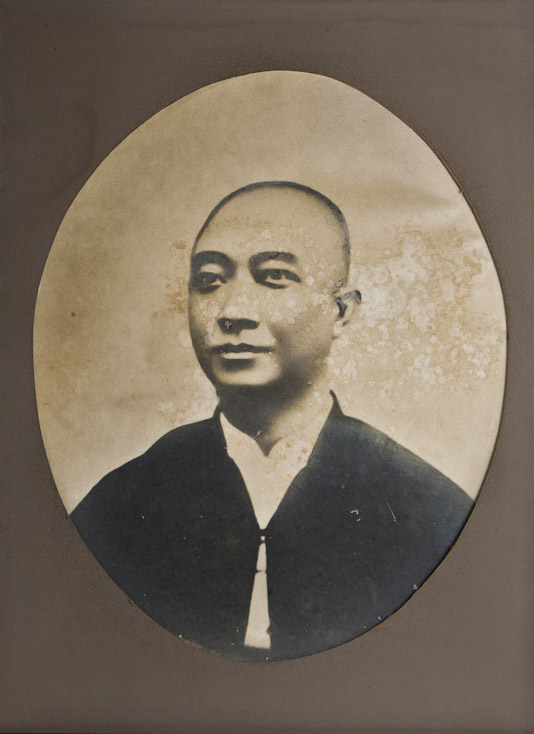
Tio Tek Ho, 4th Majoor der Chinezen of Batavia (1857–1908)

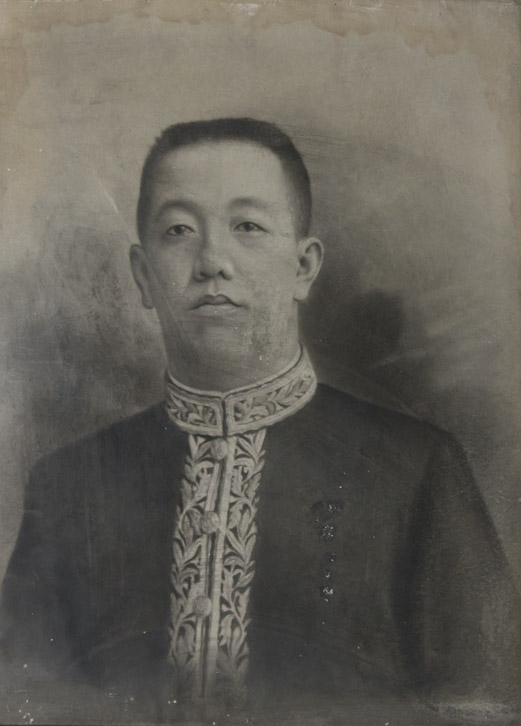
Khouw Kim An, 5th Majoor der Chinezen of Batavia (1875–1945)

=== Hoofden der Chinezen of Batavia (Senior Heads and Chairmen of the Kong Koan) ===
- 1619–1636: Kapitein Souw Beng Kong (formerly Kapitan Cina of Banten)
- 1636–1645: Kapitein Lim Lak Ko
- 1645–1663: Kapitein Phoa Beng Gan
- 1663–1666: Kapitein Gan Djie
- 1666–1678: Nyai Kapitein Gan Djie
- 1678–1685: Kapitein Tjoa Hoan Giok
- 1736–1740: Kapitein Nie Hoe Kong
- 1791–1800: Kapitein Oey Bian Kong
- 1800–1809: Kapitein Gouw Tjang Sie
- 1809–1812: Kapitein Tan Peng Long
- 1811–1817: Kapitein Tan Jap Long
- 1817–1822: Kapitein Lie Tiauw Ko
- 1822–1829: Kapitein Ko Tian Tjong
- 1829–1865: Majoor Tan Eng Goan
- 1865–1879: Majoor Tan Tjoen Tiat
- 1879–1895: Majoor Lie Tjoe Hong
- 1896–1907: Majoor Tio Tek Ho
- 1910–1945: Majoor Khouw Kim An

=== Other Chinese officers in Batavia ===
- Luitenant Souw Tok Soen
- Luitenant Souw Siauw Tjong
- Luitenant Souw Siauw Keng

=== Luitenants of Bekasi, Residency of Batavia ===
- 1854–1882: Lauw Tek Lok, Luitenant der Chinezen
- 1882–1886: Tan Kang Ie, Luitenant der Chinezen
- 1886–1893: Han Oen Lee, Luitenant der Chinezen

=== Hoofden der Chinezen of Buitenzorg (present day Bogor), Residency of Batavia ===
- Kapitein Tan Oe Ko (1829–1860)
- Kapitein Tan Soey Tiong (1860–1866)
- Kapitein Phoa Tjeng Tjoan (1866–1878)
- Kapitein Tan Kong Tjan (1869–1882)
- Kapitein Tan Goan Piauw (1878–1883)
- Kapitein Tan Goan Pouw (1883–1891)
- Kapitein Khouw Kim Tjiang (1891–1902)
- Kapitein Oey Ban Tjie (1903–1911)
- Kapitein Tan Tjoen Tjiang (1912–1913)

=== Other Chinese officers in Buitenzorg, Residency of Batavia ===
- Luitenant Thio Tian Soe (1869–1879)
- Luitenant Tan Keng Boen (1878–1879)
- Luitenant Thio Sian Lok (1879–1886)
- Luitenant Thio Sian Tjiang (1883–1886)
- Luitenant Khouw Oen Tek (1886–1889)
- Luitenant Tan Tjoen Hong (1891–1893)
- Luitenant Tan Tjoen Kiat (1892–1898)
- Luitenant Tan Tjoen Kie (1893–1895)
- Luitenant Thung Tjoen Ho (1895–1911)
- Luitenant Thung Tjeng Ho (1910–1913)
- Luitenant Lie Tjoe Tjin (1911–1913)
- Luitenant Lie Beng Hok (1912–1913)
- Luitenant Tan Hong Joe (1913–1919)
- Luitenant Tan Hong Tay (1913–1926)
- Luitenant Tan Tjoen Lien (1914–1919)
- Luitenant Tan Hong Yoe (1925–1934)
- Luitenant Tjan Soen Hay (1926–1934)

=== Hoofden der Chinezen of Tangerang, Residency of Batavia ===
- 1868–1877: Oey Tjong Piauw, Kapitein der Chinezen
- 1877–1884: Lim Tjong Hien, Kapitein der Chinezen
- 1884–1897: Oey Khe Tay, Kapitein der Chinezen (died in office)
- 1899–1907: Oey Giok Koen, Kapitein der Chinezen
- 1907–1916: Oey Djie San, Kapitein der Chinezen
- 1928–1934: Oey Kiat Tjin, Kapitein der Chinezen (died in office)

=== Other Chinese officers in Tangerang, Residency of Batavia ===
- 18xx–1887: Lim Mo Gie, Luitenant der Chinezen
- 1877–1885: Tan Tiang Po, Luitenant der Chinezen
- 1884–1897: Souw Siauw Keng, Luitenant der Chinezen
- 1899–1901: Lie Hin Liang, Luitenant der Chinezen
- 18xx–1907: Ang Kong Pan, Luitenant der Chinezen
- 18xx–1907: Kho Po Tjoan, Luitenant der Chinezen

== Kapitan Cina in the rest of Indonesia ==
=== Hoofden der Chinezen of Bandung ===
- Luitenant Oei Boen Hoen
- Luitenant Tan Haij Liong
- Kapitein Tan Joen Liong

=== Hoofden der Chinezen of Batang ===
- Kapitein Souw Ban An

=== Kapitan of Makassar ===
- ?–1679: Oeikoeko
- 1679–1701: Ongwatko
- 1701–1732: Ong Kie Go
- 1732–?: Ong King Say

=== Hoofden der Chinezen of Manado ===
- Kapitein The Tjien Tjo
- Kapitein Sie Sieuw
- Kapitein Ong Tjeng Hie
- Kapitein Lie Tjeng Lok
- Kapitein Tan Tjin Bie
- Kapitein Oei Pek Jong
- Kapitein Tjia Pak Liem
- Kapitein Lie Goan Oan
- Kapitein Tjia Goan Tjong
- Luitenant Que Ing Hie
- Luitenant Ong Bondjie
- Luitenant Tan Bian Loe
- Luitenant Tjoa Jaoe Hoei
- Luitenant Pauw Djoe

=== Luitenants of Gorontalo ===
- Luitenant Liem Peng Boen (林炳文)
- Luitenant Liem Kiem Thae (林金逮)
- Luitenant Ong Teng Hoen

=== Hoofden der Chinezen of Medan ===
- 1874–1885 Tjioe Tjoe Jen
- 1881–1887 Oen Gan The (溫顔鄭)
- 1890–1911 Majoor Tjong Yong Hian (張爵干)
- 1911–1921 Majoor Tjong A Fie (張耀轩)
- 1922–1950 Khoe Tjin Tek

=== Hoofden der Chinezen of Pontianak ===
- Kapitein Tjia Tjeng Siang

=== Hoofden der Chinezen of Surabaya ===
- 1700s–1778: Kapitein Han Bwee Kong
- 1778–1827: Majoor Han Chan Piet
- 1888–1894: Majoor The Toan Tjiak
- 1894–1900s: Majoor Tie Ing Tjay
- 1904–1906: Majoor Tan Sing Tian (陳成典)
- 1907–1913: Majoor Majoor The Toan Ing
- 1914–1924: Majoor Han Tjiong Khing

== Kapitan Cina in Malaysia ==
=== Kapitans of Sarawak ===
- 1864–1950: Kapitan China Ong Tiang Swee OBE (王長水)
- 1892-1959: Kapitan Lee Weng Thong (李永桐)

=== Kapitans of Kuala Lumpur ===
Yap Ah Loy was a Kapitan of Kuala Lumpur and is considered the founder of the city. The title was abolished in 1902, when Yap Kwan Seng died.

- 1858–1861: Hew Siew (丘秀)
- 1862–1868: Liu Ngim Kong (刘壬光)
- 1868–1885: Yap Ah Loy (叶亚来)
- 1885–1889: Yap Ah Shak (叶致英)
- 1889–1902: Yap Kwan Seng (叶观盛)

=== Kapitans of Johor / Major China of Johor ===
- 1845–1857: Tan Kee Soon (陳開順) (Kapitan of Tebrau)
- 1859–1869: Tan Cheng Hung (陳清豐) (Kapitan of Tebrau)
- 1869–18xx: Seah Tee Heng (佘泰興) (Kapitan of Sekudai)
- 1870–1875: Tan Hiok Nee (陳旭年) (Major China)
- 1885–1916: Lim Ah Siang (林亞相)
- 1916–1917: Lin Jin He (林進和)
- 2020-Present : David Wong Khong Soon (黄匡顺) (Major China)

=== Kapitans of Kuala Terengganu ===
- 1736–1820 Teo Tioh Eng (張朝榮)
- 1782–17xx Kow Geok Seng (高玉成)
- 1798–1847 Lim Eng Huat (林永發)
- 1810–18xx Kow Teck Lee (高德利)
- 18xx–18xx Low Kian Tee (劉建治)
- 18xx–1899 Wee Teck Siew (黃德修 @ 黃宏謨)
- 1xxx–19xx Kow Swee Leng (高瑞能)

=== Kapitans of Malacca ===
- 1572–1617 Tay Hong Yong @ Tay Kie Ki (鄭芳揚 @ 鄭啟基)
- 1614–1688 Li Wei King @ Li Koon Chang (李為經 @ 李君常)
- 1662–1708 Lee Chiang Hou @ Lee Chong Kian (李正壕 @ 李仲堅)
- 1643–1718 Chan Ki Lock @ Chan Lak Kua (曾其祿 @ 曾六官)
- 1725–1765 Chan Hian Kway @ Chan Kwang Hwee (曾憲魁 @ 曾光輝)
- 1703–1784 Tan Seng Yong (陳承陽)
- 1748–1794 Tan Ki Hou @ Tan Siang Lian (陳起厚 @ 陳渟廉)
- 1750–1802 Chua Su Cheong @ Chua Tok Ping (蔡士章 @ 蔡篤平)
- 1771–1882 Chan Yew Liang @ Chan Keng Sin (曾有亮 @ 曾敬信)

=== Kapitans of Penang ===
- 1787–1826 Kapitan China Koh Lay Huan (辜禮歡) was Kapitan China of Kedah, and appointed the first Kapitan China of Penang
- 1894–1908 Cheah Ching Hui (謝清輝)
- 1908–1918 Cheah Yong Chong (謝榮宗)

=== Kapitans of Perak ===
- 1830–18xx Tan Ah Hun (陳亞漢)
- 1875–1900 Chung Keng Quee (鄭景貴)
- 1875–1899 Chin Ah Yam @ Chin Seng Yam (陳亞炎) leader of the Ghee Hin during the Larut Wars
- 1886–1906 Khaw Boo Aun @ Khaw Ewe Kuang (許武安)
- 1930–1935 Chung Thye Phin (鄭大平) last Kapitan China of Perak and (British) Malaya

== Kapitans Cina in Singapore ==
=== Kapitans Cina of Singapore ===
- Choa Chong Long (蔡滄浪)
- Tan Tock Seng (陳篤生) (acting)
- Tan Kim Ching (陳金鐘)

=== Other Kapitans in Singapore ===
- Tan Hiok Nee (陳旭年)
- Oei Tiong Ham (黃仲涵)

== Capitan Chino in the Philippines ==
=== Capitánes de Chino of Binondo, Manila ===
- Capitán Carlos Palanca Tan Quien Sien (陳謙善), also known as Tan Chuey Leong or Tan Chueco or Don Chuey Leong or Don Carlos Palanca, formally leading as "Gobernadorcillo de los Sangleyes" on 1875-1877, 1885, and 1894
- Capitán Andrea Dittis Li Tan (李旦/李旭), also known as Litõa or Rey de China in Spanish, before he fled to Hirado, Nagasaki, Japan during the early 1600s
- Capitán Juan Bautista de Vera, also known as Encang or Eng Kang, leader executed during the time of the 1603 Sangley Rebellion

== China Kapitan in Japan ==
=== China Kapitan of Hirado, Nagasaki (唐人街のチナ・カピタン) ===
- Kapitan Andrea Dittis Li Tan (李旦, アンドレア・デッチス), also known as Litõa, after he fled from Manila, Spanish Philippines during the early 1600s

== Other Kapitans Cina ==
- Kapitein Lay Soen Hie, Kapitan of Pasar Baroe, Batavia (Jakarta)
- Tan Ah Hun (陳亞漢), the first Capitan China of Perak circa 1850s, father of Tan Seng Poh and father-in-law of Seah Eu Chin
- Shing Kap (盛明利), Capitan China of Sungei Ujong, and a Hai San headman
- Choa Mah Soo, Capitan China of Klias and Mempakul (circa 1869)
- Chua Su Cheong Capitan China of Dutch Malacca and father of Choa Chong Long
- Chan Yungqua, Capitan China of Malacca (18th century)
- Ah Poh, Capitan China of Lipis
- Seah Tye Heng, Capitan China of Sekudai, Johore
- Lieu Chin-Fu, Capitan China of Pulai was the last Capitan China of Kelantan
- Tan How Seng (陳篤生), Capitan China of Singapore
- Li Kap or Li Kup or Lee Wei King, Capitan China of Dutch Malacca, founder of the Cheng Hoon Teng temple there and the person who donated Bukit China for use as a Chinese burial ground
- Wee Sin Hee (黃新喜), Capitan China of Terengganu
- Tin Kap or Tay Kap, Capitan China of Portuguese Malacca, said to have been the only Capitan China appointed by the Portuguese
- Baba Seng, Capitan China of Kedah in the 1820s
- Chan Ki Lock (曾其禄) or Chan Kup, Capitan China of Dutch Malacca circa 1704
- Khaw Boo Aun
- Dato' Chua Tuah Soon (Chinese: 蔡大孫; pinyin: Cài Dàsūn)
- WEE, Hee Hoon (D: 17 March 1922 at 46 yrs of age, leaving a widow and seven children), Kapitan China of Bagan Si Api Api (Indonesia)
- OEY, Teng Kiang (Murdered 17 September 1924), Kapitan China of Palembang (Indonesia).
- KOH, Kim Hin (husband of Mrs Anne Tan-Koh who died at 79 yrs of age in 1966, and father of Bishop Roland Koh), Kapitan China of Sandakan (East Malaysia).
- OEI, Leong Tan, Kapitan China of Bengkalis.
- LEE, Lei Kam (李礽錦), the first and only Kapitan China of Perlis.
- Ong Boon Pang, Kapitan China of Brunei.
- Pang Boon Ting, Pehin Kapitan China Kornia Diraja of Brunei
- Tjoe Ten-Hien, Kapitein China of Koetaradja, Sumatra
- Tam Yong (father of towkay Tan Yee Man), Kapitan China of Seremban.
- Phang Tjong-Tjoen, Kapitan China of Belitoeng
- Lee Sam, Kapitan China of Seremban.
- LIEM, Ah Pat, Capitan China of Muntok was decorated by the Dutch Government in 1910.
- KHOO Cheow Teong, (Justice of the Peace and father of Khoo Sian Ewe), Kapitan China of Tanjungbalai, Asahan.
- Khoe Hock Cho, Kapitan China of Tanjungbalai, Asahan
- Hho Tsai Thoan, Kapitan China of Tanjungpura
- Kwee-Aan-Kie, Kapitan China of Ambarawa
- WEE, Chim Yean (Died 13 August 1926 leaving four sons and four daughters), Kapitan China of Bengkalis.
- KO, Kim Yeo, Kapitan China of Batavia.
- WEE, Boon Teng (Born in Singapore in 1864. Educated at Lye Fatt English School. Appointed Lieutenant China of Selat Panjang on the Sumatra east coast in 1890. Promoted to Capitan China in 1915 and awarded the Dutch colonial gold medal. Promoted to Majoor in 1925 prior to his retirement), Kapitan China of Selat Panjang.
- Go Hong Soen, Kapitan China of Rengat, Riau
- Tan Jin Sing, Kapitan Cina of Yogyakarta from 1803 to 1813 and of Kedhu from 1793 to 1803.

== Bibliography ==
- Trocki, Carl A. (2007). Prince of pirates: the temenggongs and the development of Johor and Singapore, 1784-1885 (2nd ed.). Singapore: NUS Press. ISBN 978-9971-69-376-3.
- Hwang, In-wŏn (2003). Personalized politics: the Malaysian state under Mahathir. Singapore: Institute of Southeast Asian Studies. ISBN 978-981-230-185-7.
- Lohanda, Mona (1996). The kapitan Cina of Batavia, 1837-1942: a history of Chinese establishment in colonial society. Jakarta: Djambatan. ISBN 978-979-428-257-1.
- Ooi, Keat Gin, ed. (2004). Southeast Asia: a historical encyclopedia, from Angkor Wat to East Timor. Santa Barbara, Calif: ABC-CLIO. ISBN 978-1-57607-770-2.
