= Kong Koan =

A kong koan (Chinese: 公館; Pe̍h-ōe-jī: kong-koán; pinyin: gōngguǎn) or Chinese council (Dutch: Chinezen Raad; Indonesian: Raad Tjina) was a high government body in the major capitals of the Dutch East Indies, consisting of all incumbent Chinese officers in those cities. It acted as both a judicial and executive authority and constituted part of the Dutch colonial system of indirect rule.

The rechtszitting, or official seat or building, housing the kong koan was called a kong tong (Chinese: 公堂; Pe̍h-ōe-jī: kong-tông; pinyin: gōngtáng; lit. 'tribunal', 'law court').

== Overview ==
The Kong Koan as a government body was inseparable from the institution of Chinese officers, who were high-ranking civil administrators, appointed by the Dutch colonial authorities to govern the local Chinese community in colonial Indonesia. In the larger cities, the active officers sat as a council, the Kong Koan, in order to adjudicate justice, govern the local Chinese community and implement the directives of the colonial government. In executing these responsibilities, the Kong Koan had its own administrative staff, headed by the First Secretary or Toa Tju, and at the height of its power also had its own police force.

== History ==
Among the Chinese Councils of colonial Indonesia, the Kong Koan of Batavia was — in the words of Mary Somers Heidhues — "primus inter pares, first founded, longest serving and most powerful". In contrast, those of Surabaya, Semarang and other cities were not as old and did not serve for as long.

The Batavia historian, P. de Roo de La Faille, traces the origin of the first Kong Koan to 1660, when the Dutch East India Company granted a plot of land to be used as a Chinese cemetery. According to de Roo de La Faille, the voluntary community organisation that managed the cemetery became the precursor of the Kong Koan. In the following decades, this community organisation acquired more government-related functions under the leadership of Batavia's Chinese officers.

In the aftermath of the Chinese Massacre of 1740, with the ensuing Chinese War still raging in the Javanese heartland, the colonial authorities felt a need to have a better relationship with Batavia's Chinese community. This led in 1742 to the reconstitution of the capital's informal Chinese community organisation as the Kong Koan of Batavia, an official government body within the Dutch colonial bureaucracy. The High Government (Hoge Regering) provided the newly recognised council with its first Kong Tong or tribunal at Jalan Tiang Bendera in Batavia's Old Town. Membership was capped at eight and consisted of the city's active Chinese officers. The Kong Koan was presided by its most senior Chinese officer, bearing the rank of Kapitein der Chinezen until 1837, thereafter that of Majoor der Chinezen. This body assumed the character of a yamen or Qing Dynasty government department.

In 1750, the council acquired an official secretary, then in 1766 an adjunct secretary. In 1809, Tan Peeng Ko, Kapitein der Chinezen of Batavia set up a subsidiary office on the southern side of the city, closer to Glodok, the Chinese quarter, to simplify the implementation of the council's day-to-day activities. In 1866, Kapitein Tan Peeng Ko's son and successor, Tan Eng Goan, the 1st Majoor der Chinezen of Batavia, officially moved the Kong Tong to larger premises in Tongkangan, where the Koan Koan remained until its abolition by the Republic of Indonesia in the early 1950s.

The history of other Chinese councils is neither as old nor as well documented. The Kong Koan of Surabaya became defunct in the 1930s following the abolition of the system of Chinese officers. Similarly, the Kong Koan of Semarang, which was only founded in 1835, was dismantled in 1931.

== See also ==
- Kapitan Cina
- Chinese Indonesians
- Chinese Indonesian surname
- 1740 Batavia massacre
- Java War (1741–1743)
- 1918 Kudus riot
- May 1998 riots of Indonesia
- Legislation on Chinese Indonesians
- Supreme Council for the Confucian Religion in Indonesia
- List of Kapitan Cina
