= Oey =

- Pronunciation: "wee"

Origin
- Origin: Indonesia
- Meaning: "Golden Yellow", "Yellow"

Oey (pronounced /wiː/; like "wee" Audio (US)) (simplified Chinese: 黄; traditional Chinese: 黃) is a Chinese Indonesian surname of Hokkien origin and Dutch-based, West Java romanization. Literally "yellow", or "golden yellow", its Central Java romanization is Oei, while its pinyin version is Huang.

Many Indonesians bearing this surname in Indonesia changed it to Indonesian-sounding surnames because of Cabinet Presidium Decision 127 of 1966—an anti-Chinese law that mandated that ethnic Chinese living in Indonesia adopt Indonesian names.

Among Malaysian Chinese and Singaporeans, the surname is often spelled Ooi or Wee.

== Notable people with the surname ==
=== Oey ===
- Alexander Oey (born 1960), Dutch film director
- Indrawati Oey (born 1970), New Zealand food scientist
- Morgan Oey (born 1990), Indonesian actor
- Oey Bian Kong (died 1802), Indonesian bureaucrat
- Oey Djie San (died 1925), Indonesian bureaucrat and landlord
- Oey Giok Koen (died 1912), Indonesian bureaucrat and landlord
- Oey Khe Tay (died 1897), Indonesian bureaucrat and landlord
- Oey Liauw Kong (1799−1865), Indonesian official and landlord
- Oey Tamba Sia (1827−1856), Indonesian playboy
- Oey Thai Lo (1788−1838), Indonesian tycoon
- Sally Oey (born 1957), American astronomer
- Taktin Oey (born 1986), American composer

=== Oei ===
- David Oei (born 1950), Hong Kong-born American pianist
- Oei Ek Tjhong (1921−2019), Indonesian businessman
- Oei Hok Tiang (born 1932), Indonesian boxer
- Oei Hong Leong (born 1947), Singaporean businessman
- Oei Hui-lan (1889−1912), Indonesian socialite and First Lady of the Republic of China
- Oei Hwie Siong (born 1939), Indonesian businessman
- Oei Hwie Tjhong (born 1941), Indonesian billionaire
- Oei Liana (born 1952), American former swimmer
- Oei Tiong Ham (1866−1924), Indonesian tycoon
- Oei Tjie Sien (1835−1900), Chinese-born Indonesian tycoon
- Pam Oei (born 1972), Singaporean actress

== See also ==
- Legislation on Chinese Indonesians
