= Tjerita Oeij Se =

1903 novel by Thio Tjin Boen

- Author: Thio Tjin Boen
- Language: Vernacular Malay
- Publisher: Sie Dhian Hoaij
- Publication date: 1903
- Publication place: Dutch East Indies
- Pages: 112
- OCLC: 68831367

Tjerita "Oeij-se": Jaitoe Satoe Tjerita jang Amat Endah dan Loetjoe, jang Betoel Soedah Kedjadian di Djawa Tengah (Note: Perfected Spelling: Cerita "Oey-se": Yaitu Satu Cerita yang Amat Endah dan Lucu, yang Betul Sudah Kejadian di Jawa Tengah, meaning The Story of "Oey-Se": Namely a Very Beautiful and Funny Story, which Did Happen in Central Java) (better known under the abbreviated name Tjerita Oeij Se; also See) is a 1903 Malay-language novel by the ethnic Chinese writer Thio Tjin Boen. It details the rise of a Chinese businessman who becomes rich after finding a kite made of paper money in a village, who then uses dishonesty to advance his personal wealth before disowning his daughter after she converts to Islam and marries a Javanese man.

Written in a journalistic style and derived from actual events, Tjerita Oeij Se was inspired by the life of the tobacco tycoon Oey Thai Lo. The novel has been read as a condemnation of interethnic marriages between ethnic Chinese women and non-Chinese men as well as reinforcement (or, alternatively, critique) of traditional Chinese values. The novel was quickly adapted to stage and spawned both a retelling in 1922 and a 2000 reprint.

== Plot ==
Oeij Se, a young trader, is passing through a rural village outside Wonosobo when he sees a young boy flying a kite made of paper money. The young boy flying the kite is unaware of its worth and, when Oeij Se expresses interest in buying it, tells the latter that there is more paper at home. Eventually Oeij Se is able to acquire over five million gulden, paying only 14 ringgit, before returning home to Pekalongan.

Investing this money, Oeij Se is quickly able to become a successful businessman, dabbling in various aspects of trade and building an extensive home for himself, his wife, and their two children. Years pass until one day a Dutchman named Vigni comes to and asks permission to store a locked chest filled with gold in Oeij Se's home for safekeeping. Oeij Se agrees, but no sooner has Vigni left than Oeij Se asks his cook for help picking the lock. Several days later, Vigni returns and is shocked to find that his gold has been replaced by silver.

Vigni and Oeij Se, departing on a ship to the colonial capital at Batavia (now Jakarta), depart on amicable terms, although Vigni suspects the latter and Oeij Se feels a little guilty over his actions. Upon arriving home Vigni commits suicide. Oeij Se, meanwhile, continues onward to Singapore, where he buys a young woman from a brothel to be his second wife. They return to Pekalongan and Oeij Se's wife, though upset, is forced by their culture to accept this new addition to the family. Oeij Se marries his second wife as his daughter, Kim Nio, marries her betrothed.

Four years later, however, Kim Nio's husband dies, leaving her a single mother. She returns to live with her family, but is furtively sought by the local regent, who wants her as his second wife. Using bribery and magic, he is able to convince her to elope with him. Oeij Se, distraught at Kim Nio having married outside her race, disowns her and acts as if she were dead, going as far as to construct a grave for her. To avoid the shame of his daughter's actions, Oeij Se moves to Batavia. Some months later Kim Nio (now a Muslim and known as Siti Fatimah) visits, seemingly to make amends with her family. She takes back her daughter and then returns to Pekalongan, dying there after seeing her own grave.

== Writing ==
Tjerita Oeij Se was written by the ethnic Chinese writer and journalist Thio Tjin Boen; it was his first novel. Scholar of Indonesian literature Jakob Sumardjo notes that the novel's style is very journalistic, focusing exclusively on events significant to the plot.

Several writers, including Sumardjo and Leo Suryadinata, write that the novel was based on news stories and the life of the tobacco tycoon Oey Thai Lo. In his history of Chinese Malay literature, Nio Joe Lan writes that it is one of the first such works of Chinese Malay literature. Sumardjo cites a 1936 magazine article which describes events which may have inspired the story: in 1901, a Dutch ship was thrown ashore, leading to chests of paper money being collected by locals who claimed right to what they could scavenge.

== Themes ==
Sumardjo writes that the novel is an explicit condemnation of ethnic Chinese assimilation along the matrilineal line, in which an ethnic Chinese woman marries a non-Chinese man. He notes that, ultimately, Kim Nio is treated as neither Chinese nor Javanese after her second marriage. Suryadinata, who notes a more positive treatment of interracial marriages along the patrilineal line in Thio's Tjerita Njai Soemirah (1917), suggests that this was caused by a fear that a Chinese woman who married into another culture would no longer be Chinese, whereas a Chinese man marrying a non-Chinese woman could facilitate her absorption into the Chinese community.

Sim Chee Cheang of the Universiti Malaysia Sabah categorises Tjerita Oeij Se as one of several Chinese Malay works which seemingly aimed to "impart morals according to the teachings of Confucius" by highlighting the "moral decay" of Chinese in the Dutch East Indies (now Indonesia) and of using Confucianism to overcome it. She writes that, along with Gouw Peng Liang's Lo Fen Koei (1903), Oei Soei Tiong's Njai Alimah (1904), Hauw San Liang's Pembalesan Kedji (1907), and Tio Ie Soei's Sie Po Giok (1911), Tjerita Oeij Se actually "looked back to the 'past', questioning and critiquing the Chinese past and identity." These themes, according to Sim, are shown through the main characters' ultimately futile attempt to find happiness by applying traditional beliefs. Sim also notes a distinct lack of female figures in the novel, a lack which was common in early examples of Chinese Malay literature.

== Publication and reception ==
Tjerita Oeij Se was published by Sie Dhian Hoaij in Surakarta, Central Java, in 1903. In 2000 the novel was reprinted in the inaugural volume of Kesastraan Melayu Tionghoa dan Kebangsaan Indonesia, an anthology of Chinese Malay literature. The novel was quickly adapted to stage, and proved to be popular with the Opera Stamboel and Dardanella through the 1920s.

In the same year, Thio wrote a novel inspired by the life of the son of Oey Thai Lo, Oey Tamba Sia and his competition with Lim Soe Keng Sia. The title of the novel is Tambahsia: Soewatoe tjerita jang betoel soedah kedjadian di Betawi antara tahoen 1851-1856. A similar novel, Tambah Sia by Boan Soeij Tjoa, emerged in 1922, which maintained many of the main events of both novels, though ultimately Oeij Se (Oeij Taij Lo in the latter novel) was able to accept his daughter's marriage to a native man. Sumardjo sees no evidence of the racial discrimination of Tjerita Oeij Se.

== Works cited ==
- Nio, Joe Lan (1962). Sastera Indonesia-Tionghoa [Indonesian-Chinese Literature] (in Indonesian). Jakarta: Gunung Agung. OCLC 3094508.
- Sim, Chee Cheang (2010). "Tionghoa Peranakan Pre-war Novels: Freeing from the Past and the Colonial, and Embracing Indonesia" (PDF). Sari: International Journal of Malay World Studies. 28 (2): 235–58. Archived (PDF) from the original on March 3, 2016.
- Sumardjo, Jakob (2004). Kesusastraan Melayu Rendah [Low Malay Literature] (in Indonesian). Yogyakarta: Galang Press. ISBN 978-979-3627-16-8.
- Suryadinata, Leo (1993). "From Peranakan Chinese Literature to Indonesian Literature: A Preliminary Study". Chinese Adaptation and Diversity: Essays on Society and Literature in Indonesia, Malaysia & Singapore. Singapore: National University of Singapore Press. pp. 101–119. ISBN 978-9971-69-186-8.
- Thio, Tjin Boen (2000). "Cerita Oeij Se". In A.S., Marcus; Benedanto, Pax (eds.). Kesastraan Melayu Tionghoa dan Kebangsaan Indonesia [Chinese Malay Literature and the Indonesian Nation] (in Indonesian). Vol. 1. Jakarta: Kepustakaan Populer Gramedia. pp. 175–250. ISBN 978-979-9023-37-7.
- "Thio Tjin Boen". Encyclopedia of Jakarta (in Indonesian). Jakarta City Government. Archived from the original on March 4, 2016.
