= Oey Khe Tay =

Chinese-Indonesian bureaucrat and landlord

Kapitein Oey Khe Tay

Kapitein der Chinezen of Tangerang
- In office 1884–1897
- Preceded by: Kapitein Lim Tjong Hien
- Succeeded by: Kapitein Oey Giok Koen
- Constituency: Tangerang

Personal details
- Born: Tangerang, Dutch East Indies
- Died: 1897; Tangerang, Dutch East Indies
- Spouse: Nie Kim Nio
- Relations: Oey Eng Sioe, Kapitein-titulair der Chinezen (grandfather); Nie Boen Tjeng, Kapitein der Chinezen (father-in-law)
- Children: Oey Djie San, Kapitein der Chinezen
- Parent: Oey Jan Long Sia (father)
- Occupation: Kapitein der Chinezen, Landheer

Oey Khe Tay, Kapitein der Chinezen (died in 1897) was a Chinese-Indonesian bureaucrat and landlord, best known for his role as Kapitein der Chinezen of Tangerang and Landheer of Karawatji. In the former capacity, he acted as the head of the Chinese civil administration in Tangerang as part of the Dutch colonial system of ‘indirect rule’.

== Life ==
Born in Tangerang into the ‘Cabang Atas’ aristocracy, Oey was the son of Oey Jan Long Sia and a grandson of Oey Eng Sioe, Kapitein-titulair der Chinezen. As a descendant of a Chinese officer, he bore the title ‘Sia’ from birth. Oey was married to Nie Kim Nio, daughter of Nie Boen Tjeng, Kapitein der Chinezen in Batavia and a descendant of Kapitein Nie Hoe Kong, who was in office during the Chinese Massacre of Batavia in 1740.

Oey was elevated to the post of Luitenant der Chinezen in 1872. On March 31, 1878, together with the rest of the Chinese officer corps of Tangerang under Kapitein Lim Tjong Hien, Oey acquired a new plot of land for use as new public burial grounds for the local Chinese community. The new burial grounds were to be managed under the auspices of Tangerang's oldest Chinese temple, Boen Tek Bio. In 1884, Oey was appointed to the position of Kapitein der Chinezen of Tangerang in succession to Kapitein Lim Tjong Hien. He served until he died in office in 1897.

The Kapitein's family owned extensive particuliere landen, or private domains, centred on Karawatji, where the family's ancestral seat, Landhuis Karawatji, stood. Two years before he died, in 1895, Kapitein Oey Khe Tay – together with his son and eventual successor, the future Kapitein Oey Djie San – incorporated Cultuur-Maatschappij Karawatji-Tjilongok. In a modernising move, ownership of the family's historic landholdings were transferred to the new company under the directorship of Oey's son and heir. Prior to his death, Kapitein Oey Khe Tay also donated a boat for the Dragon Boat Festival, or 'Peh Tjhoen'; the boat is now considered a sacred object, and is known as Mpe Peh Tjhoen [Uncle 'Peh Tjhoen'].

In 1899, following a two-year hiatus after his death in 1897, Oey was succeeded as Kapitein der Chinezen of Tangerang by Kapitein Oey Giok Koen, who was married to his wife's niece, Ong Dortjie Nio. In 1907, Kapitein Oey Khe Tay's son, Kapitein Oey Djie San, eventually succeeded his father and cousin-in-law to the Chinese captaincy of Tangerang.

== See also ==
- Kapitan Cina
- Benteng Chinese
- Particuliere landerijen

Government offices
Preceded by Kapitein Lim Tjong Hien	Kapitein der Chinezen of Tangerang; 1884–1897	Succeeded by Kapitein Oey Giok Koen
