= Oey Giok Koen =

Chinese-Indonesian public figure, bureaucrat and Landheer

Kapitein Oey Giok Koen
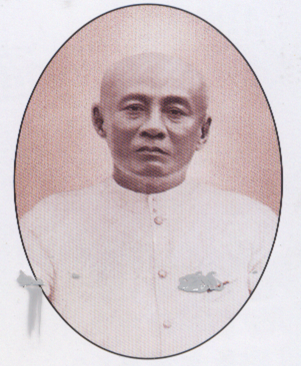
- Oey Giok Koen, Kapitein der Chinezen of Tangerang and Meester Cornelis

Kapitein der Chinezen of Meester Cornelis
- In office 1894–1899
- Preceded by: Kapitein Oey Ek Kiam

Kapitein der Chinezen of Tangerang
- In office 1899–1907
- Preceded by: Kapitein Oey Khe Tay
- Succeeded by: Kapitein Oey Djie San
- Constituency: Tangerang

Personal details
- Born: Batavia, Dutch East Indies
- Died: 1912; Batavia, Dutch East Indies
- Cause of death: stroke
- Spouse: Ong Dortjie Nio
- Relations: Oey Thai Lo, Luitenant der Chinezen (grandfather); Oey Tamba Sia (uncle); Nie Boen Tjeng, Kapitein der Chinezen (grandfather-in-law)
- Children: Oey Kim Tjang Sia (son); Oey Kim Goan Sia (son)
- Parent: Oey Makouw Sia (father)
- Occupation: Kapitein der Chinezen, Landheer

Oey Giok Koen, Kapitein der Chinezen (died in 1912) was a Chinese-Indonesian public figure, bureaucrat and Landheer, best known for his role as Kapitein der Chinezen of Tangerang and Meester Cornelis, and as one of the richest landowners in the Dutch East Indies (modern-day Indonesia). As Kapitein, he headed the local Chinese civil administration in Tangerang and Meester Cornelis as part of the Dutch colonial system of 'indirect rule'. In 1893, he bought the particuliere landen or private domains of Tigaraksa and Pondok Kosambi.

== Life ==
Born in Batavia into one of the colony's richest families, Oey was the son of Oey Makouw Sia, and was through his father a grandson of Oey Thai Lo, Luitenant der Chinezen, and a nephew of the murderous playboy Oey Tamba Sia. As a descendant of a Chinese officer, he bore the title ‘Sia’ from birth. He married Ong Dortjie Nio, who came from one of the oldest families of the ‘Cabang Atas’ aristocracy. Oey's father-in-law was the landlord Ong Boen Seng, while his mother-in-law, Nie Koen Nio, was the daughter of Nie Boen Tjeng, Kapitein der Chinezen in Batavia, and a descendant of Kapitein Nie Hoe Kong, who was in office at the time of the Chinese Massacre of Batavia in 1740.

In 1884, Oey was raised to the rank of Luitenant der Chinezen of Kebajoran in the afdeeling, or region, of Meester Cornelis, Batavia. In 1894, Luitenant Oey Giok Koen was appointed to the post of Kapitein der Chinezen of Meester Cornelis in succession to Kapitein Oey Ek Kiam (no relation; in office as Luitenant since 1879, and as Kapitein from 1883 until discharged in 1893). In 1899, Kapitein Oey Giok Koen was transferred to the Chinese captaincy of Tangerang, where his predecessor, Kapitein Oey Khe Tay had died in office in 1897. While the latter was no blood relation, the new Kapitein's wife was a niece of the deceased Kapitein's wife, Nie Kim Nio. Kapitein Oey Giok Koen remained in office until he requested, and was granted, an honourable discharge in 1907. He was succeeded by his predecessor's son (and his wife's cousin), Kapitein Oey Djie San.

Oey pursued activities that were in keeping with his rank as a Chinese officer and landowner, and became a respected community leader. In 1892, the then Luitenant Oey Giok Koen was elected president of Tjoe Hoe Tee Beng, a Confucian cultural and funeral organisation, in succession to the society's founding president, Ong Kim San. In the lead-up to the establishment of the influential Confucian organisation Tiong Hoa Hwee Koan (THHK) in 1900, Kapitein Oey Giok Koen was offered the presidency of the new society by its founders. The Kapitein refused due to his existing responsibilities towards Tjoe Hoe Tee Beng, but accepted a seat on THHK's executive board.

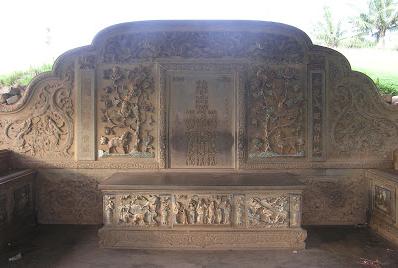
Tomb of Kapitein Oey Giok Koen

Oey was one of the wealthiest men in the Dutch East Indies due to his family inheritance, but – as pointed out by Arnold Wright – also thanks to the Kapitein's 'thriftiness'. In February 1893, Kapitein Oey Giok Koen expanded his landholdings by purchasing the particuliere landen of Tigaraksa and Pondok Kosambi from his brother-in-law, Ong Hok Tiang. The domains were initially owned by the Kapitein's father-in-law, Ong Boen Seng. Despite coming from a Peranakan lineage of long standing in the Indies, Oey also maintained interests in his ancestral China, where he was appointed in 1908, for instance, as director of the Fukien Railway Company in Amoy, Fujian.

Kapitein Oey Giok Koen had a stroke and died suddenly in 1912. He left behind an estate worth 9 million gulden, all of which went to his two minor sons, Oey Kim Tjang Sia and Oey Kim Goan Sia with the exception of a million-gulden bequest for his daughter, Oey Hok Nio. Kapitein Oey Giok Koen's descendants through his two sons remain to his day among Indonesia's oldest and wealthiest families as owners of two related, Indonesian conglomerates, Tigaraksa Satria, Tbk and Sintesa Group.

== See also ==
- Oey Thai Lo, Luitenant der Chinezen
- Oey Tamba Sia
- Kapitan Cina
- Benteng Chinese
- Particuliere landerijen

Government offices
Preceded by Kapitein Oey Khe Tay	Kapitein der Chinezen of Tangerang; 1899–1907	Succeeded by Kapitein Oey Djie San
