= Oey Liauw Kong =

Chinese-Indonesian official (1799–1865)

Oey Liauw Kong, Kapitein der Chinezen

Luitenant der Chinezen in Batavia
- In office 3 June 1833 – 1841
- Preceded by: Luitenant Tan Tjoen Ing
- Constituency: Batavia

Kapitein der Chinezen in Batavia
- In office 1841 – August 1849

Personal details
- Born: 1799 Batavia, Dutch East Indies
- Died: 19 February 1865 (aged 65–66) Batavia, Dutch East Indies
- Spouse(s): Gouw Sioe Nio (m. 1818); Jo Loan Nio (m. 1828); Lim Phek Nio
- Relations: Oey Bian Kong, Kapitein der Chinezen (grandfather); Oey Keng Hien, Luitenant der Chinezen (grandson); Han Tjiong Khing, Majoor der Chinezen (grandson)
- Children: Oey Kim Tjiang, Kapitein der Chinezen (son); Oey Tek Tjiang, Luitenant-titulair der Chinezen (son); Oey Hok Tjiang, Kapitein-titulair der Chinezen (son); Oey Giok Nio (daughter); Oey Khe Nio (daughter)
- Parent(s): Oey Liam Kong, Kapitein der Chinezen (father)
- Occupation: Kapitein der Chinezen

Oey Liauw Kong, Kapitein der Chinezen (1799–1865) was a Chinese-Indonesian high official, Landheer (landlord) and head of the Oey family of Kemiri, part of the 'Tjabang Atas' or Peranakan gentry. He was also the owner of the 18th-century Baroque mansion and Jakarta landmark, Toko Merah.

== Biography ==
Oey was born in 1799 in Batavia (now Jakarta), Dutch East Indies (present-day Indonesia) into an old, landowning family with a tradition of public service. He was the son of Oey Liam Kong, Kapitein der Chinezen, and a grandson of Oey Bian Kong, the 20th Kapitein der Chinezen of Batavia, who was in office from 1791 until 1800. Through his grandfather, he was also a great-grandson of the celebrated poet-bureaucrat Oey Tje, Kapitein der Chinezen of Semarang, installed in 1753. The Chinese officership, consisting of the ranks of Majoor, Kapitein and Luitenant der Chinezen, was an arm of the Dutch colonial government with administrative and judicial jurisdiction over the colony's Chinese subjects.

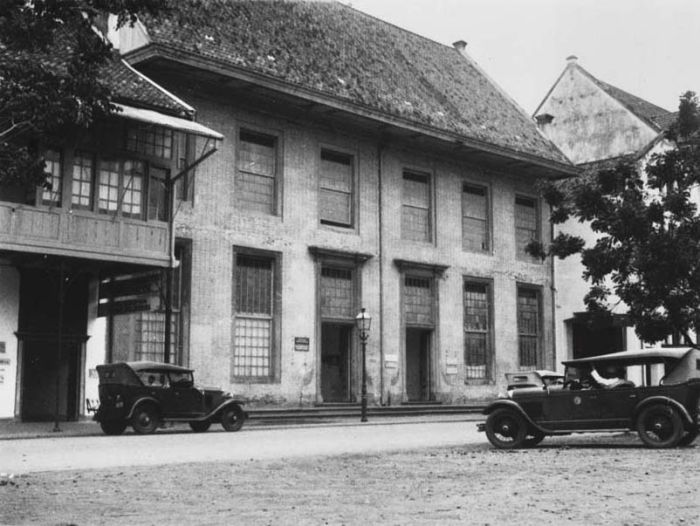
Toko Merah, townhouse of Kapitein der Chinezen Oey Liauw Kong

Oey was married to Gouw Tong Nio on April 29, 1818, then on the latter's death, to Jo Loan Nio on June 31, 1828, daughter of Jo Thaij San, Luitenant der Chinezen (appointed in 1810). On being widowed for the second time, he married Lim Phek Nio.

Oey's bureaucratic career began with his appointment as Luitenant der Chinezen on June 3, 1833, in succession to the recently deceased Luitenant Tan Tjoen Ing. He served under Tan Eng Goan, the Kapitein der Chinezen of Batavia, whose post as senior Chinese officer in the colonial capital was raised in 1837 to a Mayoralty. In 1841, Luitenant Oey Liauw Kong was promoted to the post of Kapitein der Chinezen, still serving under Majoor Tan Eng Goan. In August 1849, Kapitein Oey Liauw Kong submitted his request for a resignation to Jan Jacob Rochussen, Governor-General of the Dutch East Indies, and was honorably discharged with the courtesy title of Kapitein-titulair der Chinezen.

He bought Toko Merah in 1851 as his townhouse and family residence. He died in on February 19, 1865.

== Issue ==
All of his sons were raised to the Chinese officership; and many of his children were married off into other families of the Tjabang Atas. His eldest son, Oey Kim Tjiang, was appointed Luitenant-titulair in 1847, Luitenant in 1851, then succeeded his father as Kapitein-titulair der Chinezen in 1865. Kapitein Oey Liauw Kong's two younger sons by Jo Loa Nio were Oey Tek Tjiang, Luitenant-titulair der Chinezen (appointed in 1855) and Oey Hok Tjiang, Kapitein-titulair der Chinezen (appointed in 1883). His daughters included Oey Khe Nio, who married Han Ting Hway, son of Han Tiauw Hien, Luitenant der Chinezen in Surabaya, and Oey Giok Nio, who married the prominent landlord Nie Ek Tjiang, Luitenant der Chinezen in Batavia and Tangerang.

Among his grandsons were Oey Keng Hien, Luitenant der Chinezen in Batavia, son of Kapitein-titulair Oey Hok Tjiang, and Han Tjiong Khing, the last Majoor der Chinezen of Surabaya, son of Oey Khe Nio.
