= Atilah Soeryadjaya =

Indonesian theatre producer and director

- Born: Bandoro Raden Ayu (BRAy) Atilah Rapatriati; 28 April 1961; Solo, Central Java, Indonesia
- Occupations: Producer, director, socialite
- Spouse: Edward Soeryadjaya (Tjia Han Sek)
- Children: 6
- Writing career
- Period: 2010–present

Atilah Soeryadjaya (Bandoro Raden Ayu (BRAy) Atilah Rapatriati, born 28 April 1961) is an Indonesian theatre producer, director, dancer, businesswoman, and socialite whose career spanned since 2010. She is the Javanese noblewoman through her grandfather, a Surakarta-based Javanese king, Mangkunegara VII. She is married to the business tycoon, Edward Soeryadjaya, son of the founder of Astra International, William Soeryadjaya.

== Early years ==
Born Bandara Raden Ayu Atilah Rapatriatias one of the granddaughters of the Surakarta-based Javanese king, Mangkunegara VII and raised in the royal court, Atilah has ancient Javanese traditions and culture running deep in her veins.

However, as a teenager, she took an interest in modern modeling, singing, and dancing, and decided to pursue language and contemporary arts in Germany after graduating from high school. She ended up in a music company, touring for years in Europe in 1980, while still studying music and contemporary dance.

She attended the Tourism School of Jakarta (Sekolah Pariwisata Jakarta ).

== Career ==
When she read a Singapore news story that dubbed her ancestral home, Solo, as a paradise for Islamic terrorism. Surakarta, after terrorist leader Noordin Mohammad Top had been killed in his hiding place in the city in 2009, Soeryadjaya determined to restore her hometown's image. She then decided to stage a Javanese sendratari drama Matah Ati show it to the rest of the world as the true image of Solo and to hold the play in Singapore, where it could attract more of a global audience. Matah Ati was staged in the Esplanade, Singapore concert hall from 22 to 23 October 2010, and was successful in Singapore.

The idea of Matah Ati, came after she witnessed the staging of the musical Miss Saigon in the same theatre. She immediately returned to Solo and work hard to realize her dream, raise the culture of Indonesia in that prestigious stage. In preparation for Matah Ati, she joined dancers, choreographers, and court musicians to work long hours with her team in Surakarta, combining the contemporary with classical Javanese dance and music, with the help of modern technology. Matah Ati tells of the life of Rubiah, who became Raden Ayu Kusuma Matah Ati after tying the knot with the first Mangkunegaran king Raden Mas Said, and portrays her as a strong Javanese female. Rubiah was the leader of a 40-strong group of Javanese female warriors. -

Luckily for her, husband of Chinese descent also support it. The success of Matah Ati in Esplanade, Singapore attract Federation for Asian Cultural Promotion (FACP), an institution that promotes the culture of Asia-Pacific countries. Because, for 25 years no cultural activities held in Indonesia, the country which is actually very rich in cultural diversity.

Thanks to Matah Ati, Indonesia also accepted as a member of FACP back even chosen to host the FACP Conference, from 6 to 9 September. It held in Solo, the hometown of Atilah. Atilah also nominated it as a candidate to host the Solo FACP Conference. Not in vain, Solo was chosen to host and defeated a larger city, Beijing which is also nominated. As a gift to the citizens of Solo, during the event of FACP Conference which followed by 500 participants from 30 countries, the Matah Ati staged every day for free.

One year later, in 2013, Soeryadjaja’s colossal play be staged at the Monumen Nasional, just in time to celebrate Jakarta’s 486th anniversary. The play, titled Ariah, was not planned to be her second production after the successful epic Javanese play Matah Ati. Ariah will involve at least 300 dancers and musicians, performing on a 3,456-square-meter-wide stage comprising three different heights of 3, 7 and 10 meters. A total of 15,000 spectators are expected for the show, set to be performed from June 28 to June 30.

Ariah is based on the legendary tale of Ariah, a Betawi (native Jakartan) female warrior who stepped up against her Dutch oppressors and led fellow farmers in a violent revolt against the colonialists in 1869, when Jakarta was still known as Batavia. The plot of the musical is also inspired by the historic rivalry between the notorious playboy Oey Tamba Sia (1827-1856) and Tan Eng Goan, first Majoor der Chinezen of Batavia (1802-1872), as well as the latter's son-in-law, Lim Soe Keng Sia.

== Personal life ==
In 1998, she married her second husband, business tycoon Edward Soeryadjaya, son of William Soeryadjaya and later helped with his business.

Atilah enjoys Rock music and is a fan of top Indonesian bands of the 70s: God Bless and AKA. In her room, Atilah even put up the posters of AKA's singer who is now deceased, Ucok Harahap.

== Work ==
=== Stage ===
- 2012: Matah Ati
- 2013: Ariah
