= Sie Po Giok =

1911 children's novel by Ie Soei Tio

- Author: Tio Ie Soei
- Language: Vernacular Malay
- Genre: Children's novel
- Publisher: Hoa Siang In Giok
- Publication date: 1911
- Publication place: Dutch East Indies
- Pages: 167
- OCLC: 227807289

Tjerita Sie Po Giok, atawa Peroentoengannja Satoe Anak Piatoe (Note: Malay for The Story of Sie Po Giok, or the Fate of an Orphan; Perfected spelling: Cerita Sie Po Giok, atawa Peruntungannya Satu Anak Piatu) (better known by the short title Sie Po Giok) is a 1911 children's novel from the Dutch East Indies (now Indonesia) written by Tio Ie Soei in vernacular Malay. It tells the story of Sie Po Giok, a young orphan who faces several challenges while living with his uncle in Batavia (now Jakarta). The story, which has been called the only work of children's literature produced by Chinese Malay writers, has been read as promoting traditional gender roles and questioning Chinese identity.

== Plot ==
The orphan Sie Po Giok lives with his uncle, Sie Thian Bie, his uncle's wife, and their seven children at their home in Batavia (now Jakarta). He is sensitive, well-mannered, and polite, yet feels insecure, and two of his cousins hate him. However, Po Giok can usually confide in Thian Bie's eldest daughter, nine-year-old Kim Nio. One day, he sees Ho Kim Tjiang stealing some guavas. When Po Giok attempts to accost the older boy, he is threatened into silence. Only after several days does his conscience for Po Giok to tell his uncle about the theft. Thian Bie fires the boy, who begins plotting revenge with his mother. Po Giok, meanwhile, is called a coward for not immediately exposing the perpetrator of the crime.

Conflict between Po Giok and his cousin Si Po Houw is exacerbated when the former outperforms the latter at school. In revenge, his cousin steals a sawo fruit then slips the skin into a window leading to Po Giok's room. Po Giok is accused of having stolen the fruit and punished. The following morning Thian Bie, hungover from a party the night before, forces Po Giok to pray to his parents then takes a stick of rattan and beats the boy "half dead" (Note: Original: "... setenga mati.") when he refuses to admit to the theft. Po Giok collapses, and is unable to attend school; he is further alienated from his adoptive family. Ultimately, Thian Bie learns that Po Houw had stolen the fruit, and as he prepares to hit the boy Po Giok insists that Po Houw not be harmed. Thian Bie agrees, and instead forces his son to eat separately from the family. Po Houw and Po Soeij slowly warm to their cousin as they see his pure heart.

Po Giok learns that his long-lost uncle, Tjan Haij Boen, wants to take him as a son. When Haij Boen meets with Po Giok and Thian Bie, they agree that the former will join him in China in several months. However, before this plan can be set into motion Kim Tjiang—long unable to find a job in Batavia owing to his theft—sets fire to the Sie family's home. As Kim Tjiang escapes with some of their valuables, Po Giok rescues Kim Nio from the burning building. They are both severely injured, but survive. At the agreed time, Po Giok goes to China, where he becomes immensely wealthy over the next twenty years.

== Writing ==
Sie Po Giok was written by Tio Ie Soei, a Batavia-born journalist of Chinese descent. It was his first novel. The story consists of eighteen chapters and has multiple footnotes in which Tio expands on the content, including one towards the end of the novel which tells the reader the ultimate fates of Thian Bie and his children.

== Themes ==
Sim Chee Cheang of the Universiti Malaysia Sabah categorises Sie Po Giok as one of several Chinese Malay works which seemingly aimed to "impart morals according to the teachings of Confucius" by highlighting the "moral decay" of Chinese in the Dutch East Indies (now Indonesia) and of Confucianism to overcome it. She writes that, along with Thio Tjin Boen's Tjerita Oeij Se (1903), Gouw Peng Liang's Lo Fen Koei (1903), Oei Soei Tiong's Njai Alimah (1904), and Hauw San Liang's Pembalesan Kedji (1907), Sie Po Giok actually "looked back to the 'past', questioning and critiquing the Chinese past and identity." These themes, according to Sim, are shown through the main characters' ultimately futile attempt to find happiness by applying traditional beliefs.

Sim also notes a predominant theme of submissiveness amongst the female characters, a reinforcement of traditional gender roles. She writes that Po Giok's aunt is only seen to prepare food or plead for her husband to stop beating Po Giok. Kim Nio, meanwhile, is only able to support Po Giok emotionally, but cannot protect him physically and is unable to stop her father's beatings or brothers' hatred of the orphan.

== Release and reception ==
Sie Po Giok was first printed as a serial in the Chinese-run daily Sin Po, where it was a success. The story was then novelised in 1911 (some sources give 1912) and published by Hoa Siang In Giok, a publishing house owned by Tio's in-laws; a second edition was published by Goan Hong & Co. in 1921. In 2000 the book was reprinted, using the Perfected Spelling System, in the first volume of Kesastraan Melayu Tionghoa dan Kebangsaan Indonesia, an anthology of Chinese Malay literature.

In his history of Chinese Malay literature, Nio Joe Lan wrote that Sie Po Giok was the only book produced by Chinese writers which was fit for children to read. He notes that Tio made the audience explicit in his foreword, which also included a statement directed at female readers. Other works directed at younger readers were educational ones, such as for studying the alphabet.
