= Ngo Ho Tjiang =

The Ngo Ho Tjiang Kongsi (Chinese: 五虎将; pinyin: Wǔ Hǔ Jiàng; the 'Five Tiger Generals'), sometimes spelled Ngo Houw Tjiang, was a powerful consortium that dominated the opium pacht or tax farm of the Residency of Batavia, Dutch East Indies (now Indonesia) in the early to mid-nineteenth century. The pacht was an outsourced tax operation, collecting customs, excise and indirect duties on behalf of the Dutch colonial government.

The five partners of the consortium were the pachters Lauw Ho, Gouw Kang Soei, Luitenant-titulair der Chinezen, Tan Ling, Khouw Siong Bo and Tan Kong Boen. The name of the kongsi refers to the five generals of the 14th-century Chinese classic novel, The Romance of the Three Kingdoms. Of all colonial-era pachten, opium was by far the most lucrative; and the five partners of Ngo Ho Tjiang were consequently among the wealthiest and most powerful tycoons of early to mid-nineteenth century Java. Ngo Ho Tjiang had very close ties to the colonial Chinese bureaucracy. One of the partners, Luitenant-titulair Gouw Kang Soei, sat on the Kong Koan ('Chinese Council') of Batavia, while the consortium's administrator, Lim Soe Keng Sia, was a son-in-law of Tan Eng Goan, the 1st Majoor der Chinezen of Batavia and the city's most senior Chinese official.
