= Oey Djie San =

Chinese-Indonesian public figure, bureaucrat and landlord

Kapitein Oey Djie San
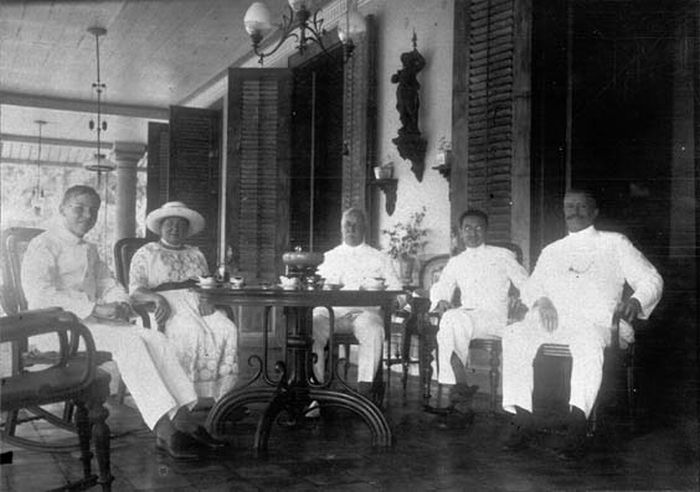
- Oey Djie San, Kapitein der Chinezen of Tangerang with his European guests, circa 1920-22 (Tropenmuseum)

Kapitein der Chinezen of Tangerang
- In office 1907–1916
- Preceded by: Kapitein Oey Giok Koen
- Succeeded by: Kapitein Oey Kiat Tjin
- Constituency: Tangerang

Member of the Gewestelijke Raad of Batavia
- In office 1917–1925

Personal details
- Born: Tangerang, Dutch East Indies
- Died: 1925; Tangerang, Dutch East Indies
- Relations: Oey Jan Long Sia (paternal grandfather); Nie Boen Tjeng, Kapitein der Chinezen (maternal grandfather); Oey Eng Sioe, Kapitein-titulair der Chinezen (great-grandfather)
- Children: Oey Kiat Tjin, Kapitein der Chinezen (son); Oey Kiat Ho (son)
- Parent(s): Oey Khe Tay, Kapitein der Chinezen (father); Nie Kim Nio (mother)
- Occupation: Kapitein der Chinezen, Landheer

Oey Djie San, Kapitein der Chinezen (died in 1925) was a Chinese-Indonesian public figure, bureaucrat and landlord, best known for his role as Landheer of Karawatji and Kapitein der Chinezen of Tangerang. In the latter capacity, he headed the local Chinese civil administration in Tangerang as part of the Dutch colonial system of 'indirect rule'.

== Life ==
Oey was born into an old family of the 'Cabang Atas' aristocracy in the Dutch East Indies (modern-day Indonesia). His father, Oey Khe Tay, also served as Kapitein der Chinezen of Tangerang from 1884 until dying in office in 1897, while his great-grandfather, Oey Eng Sioe, was a Luitenant der Chinezen from 1856 until 1864 before retiring with the honorary rank of Kapitein-titulair der Chinezen. Oey's mother, Nie Kim Nio, was the daughter of Nie Boen Tjeng, Kapitein der Chinezen and a descendant of Kapitein Nie Hoe Kong, who was in office at the time of the Chinese Massacre of Batavia in 1740. As a descendant of Chinese officers, Oey bore the title 'Sia' from birth. In addition to their tradition of public service, his family also owned extensive particuliere landerijen, or private domains, in Tangerang, centred on Karawatji.

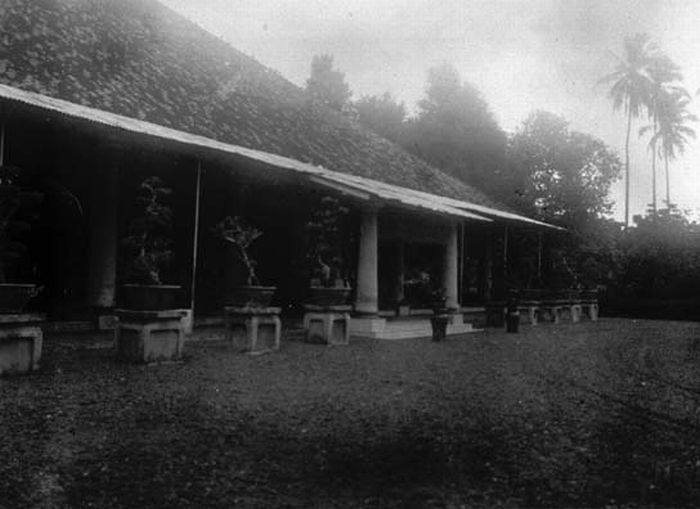
Landhuis Karawatji, country seat of Oey Djie San, Kapitein der Chinezen of Tangerang, circa 1920-22 (Tropenmuseum)

In 1895, together with his father, Oey incorporated Cultuur-Maatschappij Karawatji-Tjilongok, a new landholding company with a capital of 600,000 guilders, controlling the family's historic domains of Karawatji-Tjilongok, Grendeng, Gandoe and Karawatji-Tjibodas. He acted as director of the newly-established company. As a Chinese-Indonesian country squire, he supported local education and cultural endeavours, for example by acting as patron of the local branch of Tiong Hoa Hwee Koan, a Confucian cultural and educational organisation, when it was founded in Tangerang in 1904. He also dabbled in horse racing, sending his thoroughbred, Rosebloom, to the races in 1907.

Oey's bureaucratic career began with his elevation in 1907 to the post of Kapitein der Chinezen of Tangerang in succession to the outgoing Kapitein Oey Giok Koen (in office from 1899 until 1907). The new incumbent was a maternal first cousin of the outgoing Kapitein's wife. This appointment broke with established convention, which dictated that a Kapitein should only be chosen from the ranks of Luitenants, usually the oldest or longest-serving. Though he came from a family of Chinese officers, Oey had not served previously in any government position. In 1909, he took a leave of absence for one year while he travelled on a 'Grand Tour' of Europe, in part to visit his two eldest sons who were at school in Haarlem in the Netherlands. He resumed his duties upon returning to the Indies in 1910, and served as Kapitein until 1916. In 1917, the former Kapitein was appointed by the colonial authorities to the Gewestelijke Raad ['Regional Council'] of Batavia.

Kapitein Oey Djie San died on October 11, 1925, in Karawatji, Tangerang. His eldest son, Oey Kiat Tjin, succeeded him as Landheer of Karawatji, and eventually in 1928 as the last Kapitein der Chinezen of Tangerang; a younger son, Oey Kiat Ho, was a prominent landowner and community leader.

== See also ==
- Kapitan Cina
- Benteng Chinese
- Particuliere landerijen

Government offices
| Preceded by Kapitein Oey Giok Koen | Kapitein der Chinezen of Tangerang; 1907–1916 | Succeeded by Kapitein Oey Kiat Tjin |
