= Oei =

OEI or Oei can refer to:

== OEI ==
- Institute for East European Studies
- Obsidian Entertainment, Inc., a video game developer
- Organization of Ibero-American States, known by the Spanish and Portuguese-derived acronym, OEI
- Ozarks Entertainment, Inc., a former owner of the Dogpatch USA amusement park in the United States

== Oei ==
- Ōei, a Japanese era name spanning from 1394 to 1428

=== Surname ===
- David Oei, Hong Kong-born American classical pianist
- Madame Wellington Koo (born Oei Hui-lan), Chinese-Indonesian international socialite and style icon, briefly First Lady of the Republic of China
- Theresa Oei, biomedical researcher
- Oei Tiong Ham, Majoor-titulair der Chinezen, colonial Chinese-Indonesian tycoon in Southeast Asia
- Oei Wie Gwan, Chinese-Indonesian businessman and founder of Djarum

== See also ==
- Oey, a surname
