= Toko Merah =

Coordinates: 6.135955°S 106.811285°E

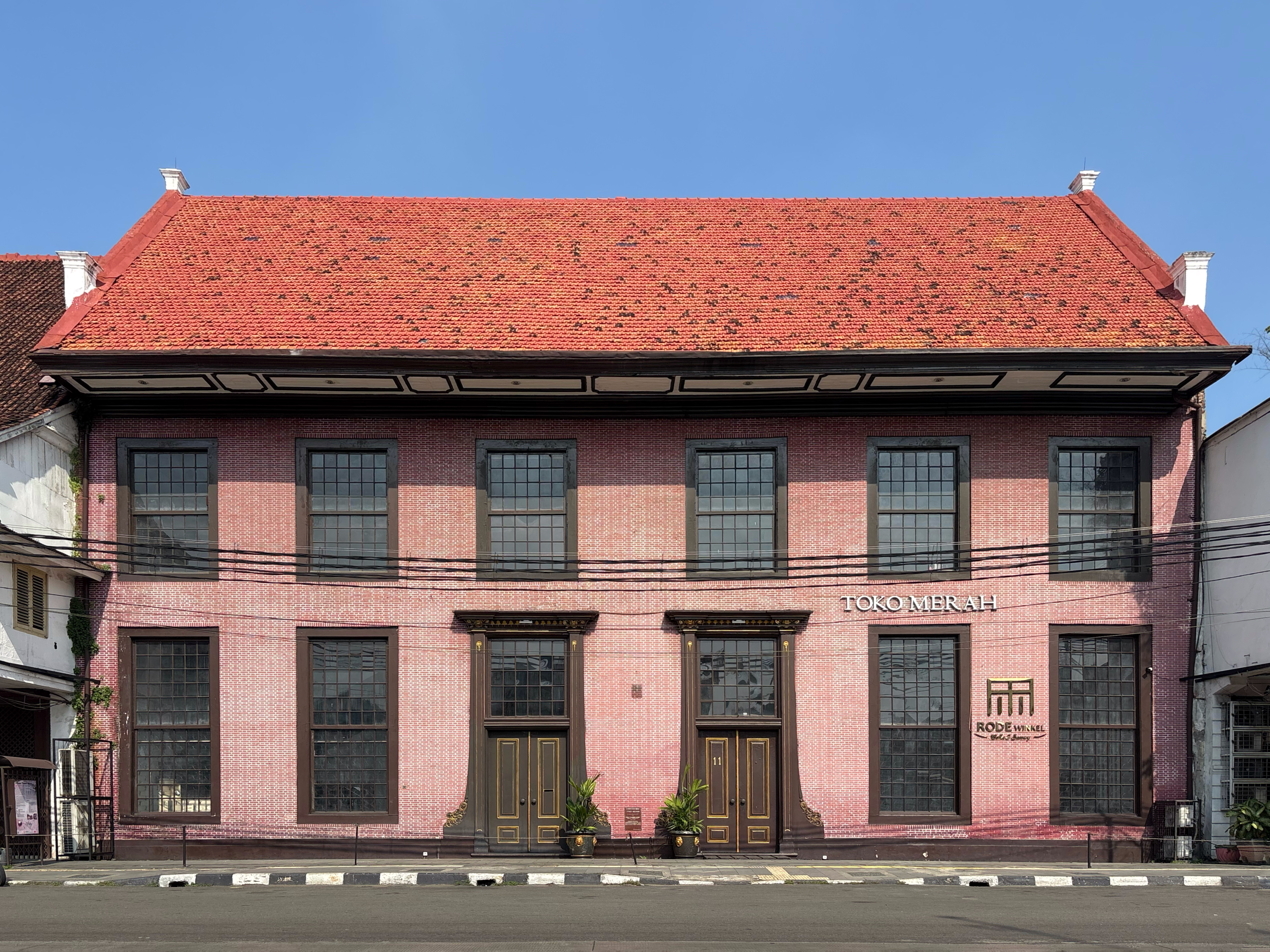
The building Toko Merah.

Toko Merah (Indonesian "Red Shop") is a Dutch colonial landmark in Jakarta Old Town, Indonesia. Built in 1730, it is one of the oldest buildings in Jakarta. The building is located on the west side of the main canal Kali Besar. The building's red color contributes to its current name.

One of the famous guests of the building Toko Merah is William Bligh.

== History ==
Toko Merah was first built around 1730 by Gustaaf Willem, Baron van Imhoff, then a rising officer of the Dutch East Indies company working as the water tax officer (1730) and later first secretary and extraordinary council of the Indies (1731). Imhoff seem not to have lived long in the house as in 1736 Imhoff moved to Ceylon to assume the position of Dutch Ceylon Governor. Imhoff later returned to Batavia in 1743 to be appointed as the Governor-General of the Dutch East Indies. With this appointment, Imhoff would have been provided with the lavish residence in the premises of Batavia Castle, rendering his old town house obsolete. From 1743 to 1755, the building served as a Navy Academy.

Afterwards, the ownership of the building changed several times. The Jakarta tourism website claims that it was residence of several Governor generals, including Jacob Mossel (in office 1750–1761), Petrus Albertus van der Parra (1761–1775), and Reynier de Klerck (1777–1780). But according to Diessen (1989: 165-166), it was never a residence of those governor generals but rather their close relatives. First, it was residence to Phillipine Theodora (Jacob Mossel's daughter) and her husband Nicolaas Hartingh, who was the Governor and Director of northeast Java from 1754 to 1761. Then it became the residence of the widow to Van der Parra and De Klerck respectively.

The building was converted into a hotel from 1786 to 1808; the manager of the hotel built rows of carriage houses and stables to keep the hotel's eight carriages and its sixteen horses. These additional buildings were later converted into row houses. During the period, the building Toko Merah also provided six boats on the Kali Besar to transport goods from the Sunda Kelapa harbor. In 1851, the building was purchased by Oey Liauw Kong, Kapitein der Chinezen of Batavia, for use as his residence and shop, and was painted red, and so it was known as Toko Merah.

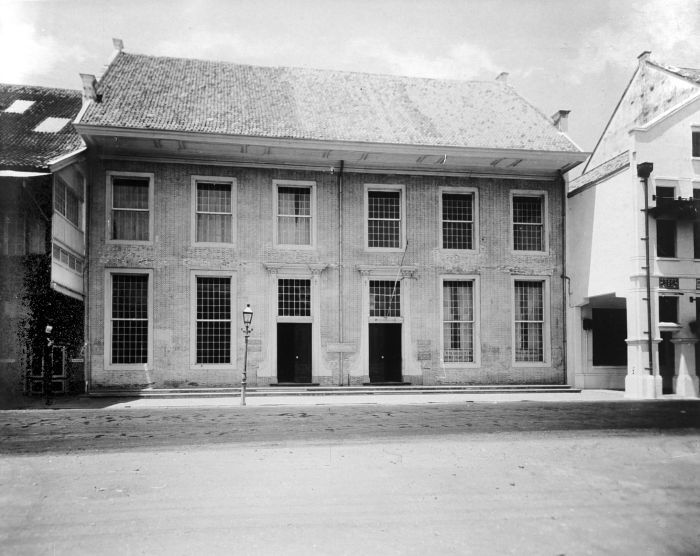
Toko Merah as the office of the Bank voor Indië

The building was restored by J.F. van Hoytema in 1920. It was the office for the Bank voor Indië between 1920 and 1940. Afterwards, the building was used as the office of Jacobson van den Berg, an international Dutch-owned company.

After the nationalization of Dutch companies in 1957, Toko Merah became an office for various state-owned enterprises e.g. PT. Satya Niaga (1972)

The aim is to restore Toko Merah as a conference hall and a commercial gallery. The plan is that current (mid-2012) restorations will be complete by the end of 2012.

== Architecture ==
The architecture style of the building follows the earliest period of Dutch colonial architecture. The style were basically the tropical counterparts of 17th century Dutch architecture. Typical features include the typically Dutch high sash windows with split shutters, and gable roofs. The building was solidly built with relatively enclosed structures, a structure that is not very friendly to tropical climate as compared to the Dutch colonial architecture of the next period in Jakarta.

== Surrounding area ==
The building is located in Jakarta Old Town, the historic center of Jakarta. It is within a walkable distance from other cultural heritage displaying the history Batavia e.g. Jakarta History Museum, Wayang Museum, and the Sunda Kelapa harbor.

== See also ==
- List of colonial buildings and structures in Jakarta
- Tambora, Jakarta

== Cited works ==
- Shahab, Alwi (2006). Cerita Cerita Betawi - Maria van Engels: menantu Habib Kwitang [Betawi Stories - Maria van Engels: Daughter in Law of Habib Kwitang]. Jakarta: Republika. ISBN 9789793210728.
