= Kali Besar =

Place in Jakarta, Indonesia

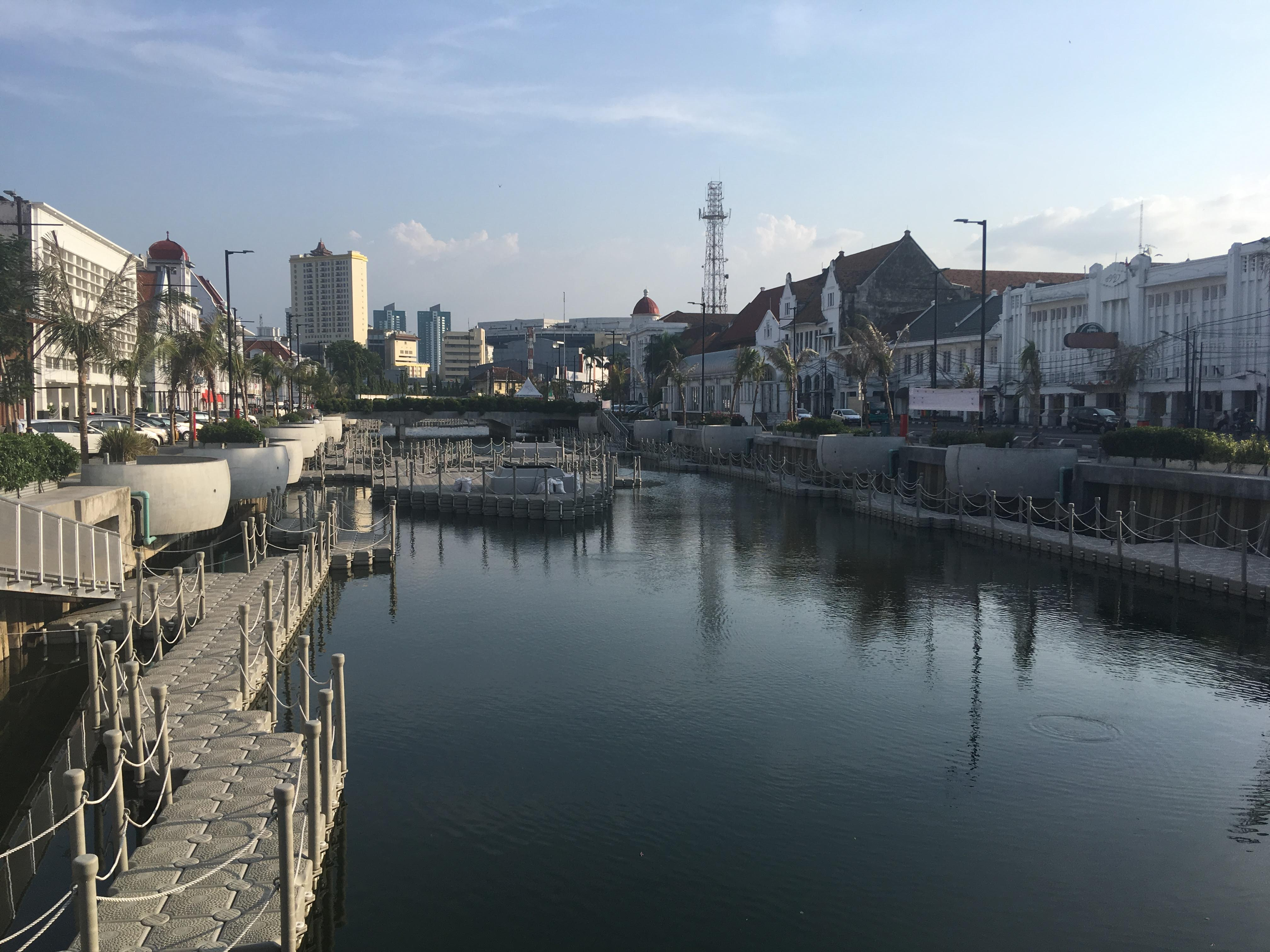
- Kali Besar in 2018

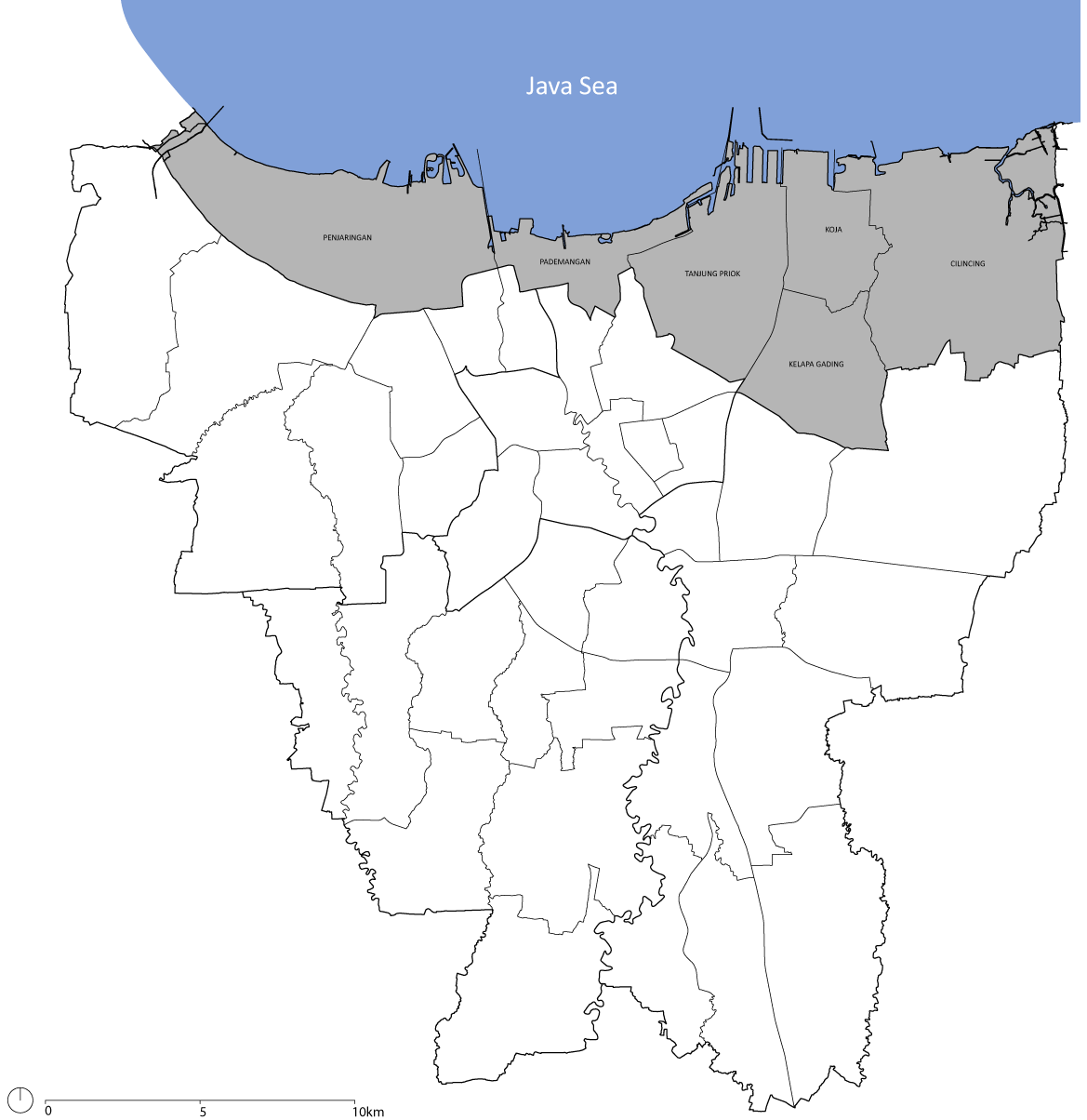

- Coordinates: 6°07′52.9″S 106°48′38.1″E Location of Kali Besar area in Jakarta
- Country: Indonesia
- Province: DKI Jakarta
- City: North Jakarta
- District: Tambora

Kali Besar (lit. 'Big river', Dutch: de Groote Rivier) refers to the channel connecting Sunda Kelapa in the north to the south part in old town of Jakarta, parallel to Ciliwung River in their east disemboguing at the heart of the old city of Jakarta. Literally meaning Grand River, this channel is now part of Kali Krukut in Tambora subdistrict.

== History ==
The Kali Besar bend was once straightened out on the orders of Jacques Specx in 1631–1632. In the early days of Batavia in 17th century, ships usually sailed along a Kanaal to Kali Besar, where unloading and ship repairs were done in dockyards in front of the long Kasteel but due to deposition of sand in the estuary and the size of the ships were getting bigger they could no longer pass the channel. The boats were then pulled by horses and slaves. For larger ships, passengers and cargoes were unloaded into small boats or barges.

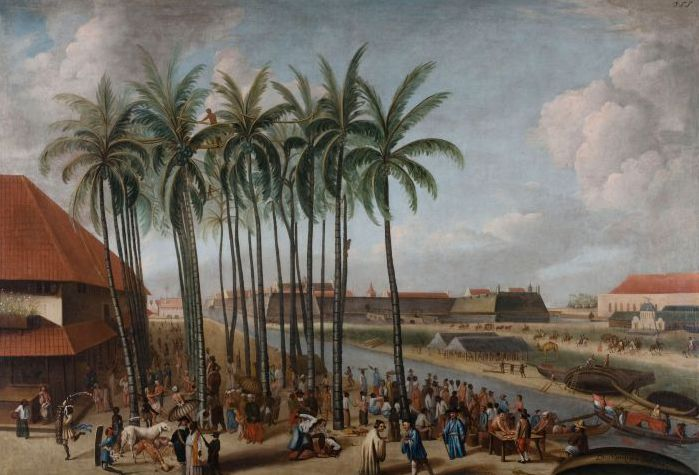
Oil painting depicting the Castle of Batavia seen from Kali Besar

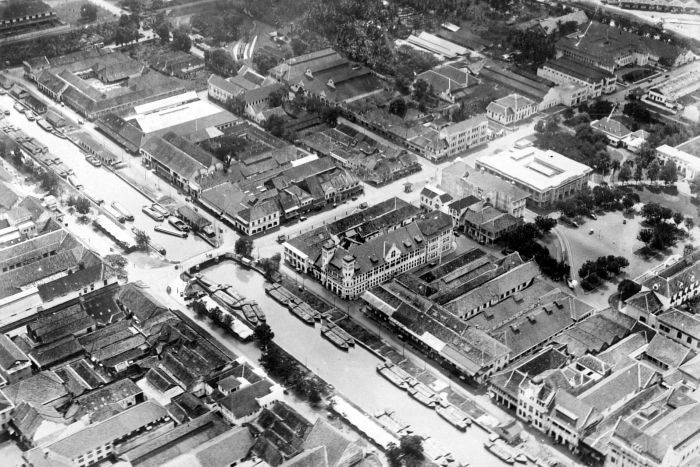
Aerial picture of Kali Besar in 20th century

There used to be various buildings along the Kali Besar in the VOC era, such as warehouses, private settlements, churches and markets. Some of the existing markets in the Kali Besar include Vegetable Market, Banana Market, Chicken Market and Rice Market. Many of the buildings located along Kali Besar Barat street and Kali Besar Timur street are of European architecture and were built in the 19th century, including old buildings, offices and warehouses. The existence of these buildings form a historic neighborhood that became a tourist attraction, especially for recreational tourists who want to enjoy the atmosphere of "Old Town".

Kali Besar was the center of economy and trading of VOC where there were buildings for the manufacture and repair of ships as well as for the laborers or slaves to work. Kali Besar was seen as an elite residential area in the early 18th century and later transformed to become the central area of offices for international trading. One example is The Red Store building. Many houses of Chinese immigrants were once built around the area, but many later burned down during the 1740 Batavia pogrom.

Kali Besar has several times changed its function, after the Ciliwung straightening in 1632, where small ships could bring goods from the sea and from the hinterland to the port. Since 1870, a growing number of commercial companies appeared in Kali Besar, and became the central area of offices of international commerce until the 1960s.

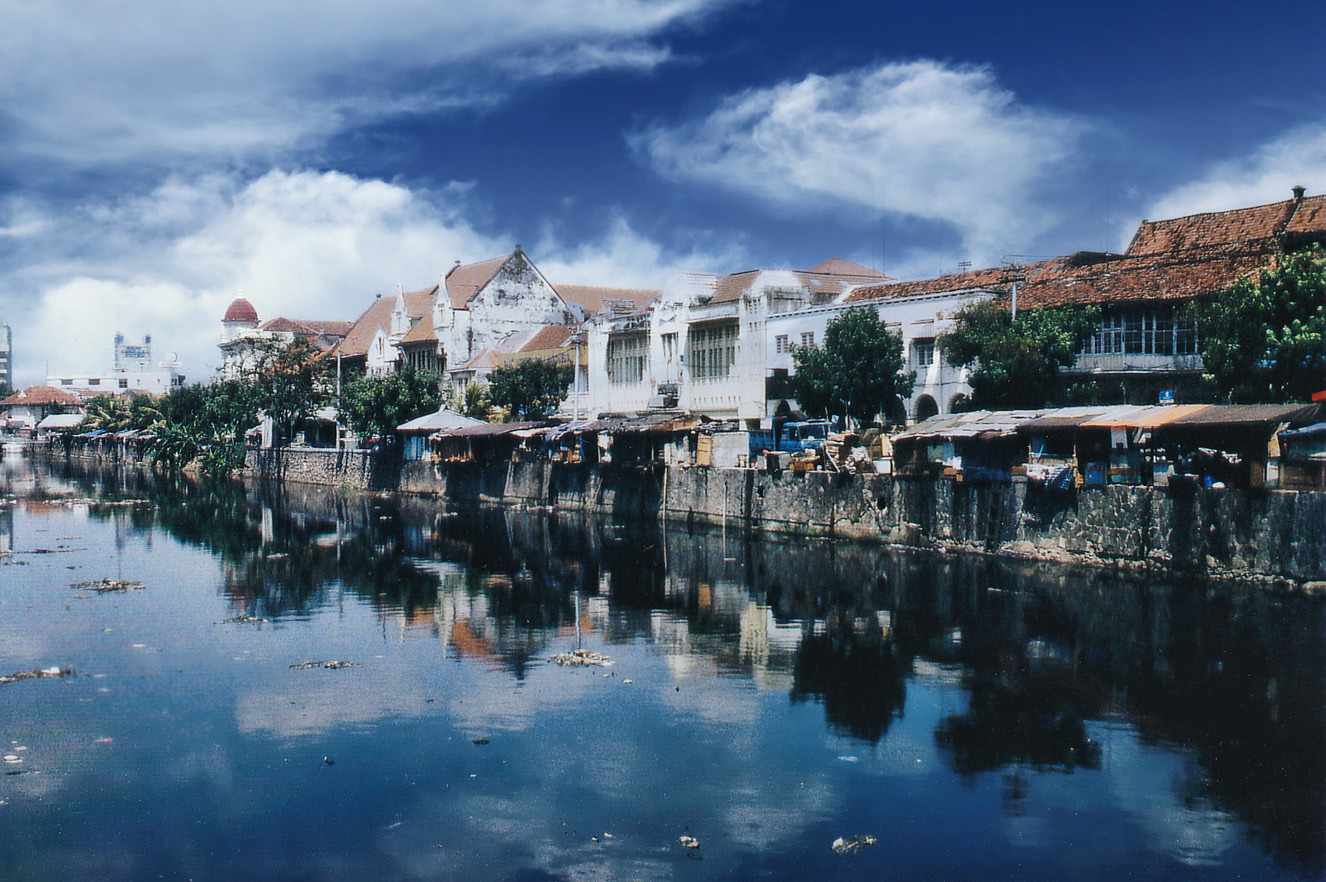
Kali Besar in 1987

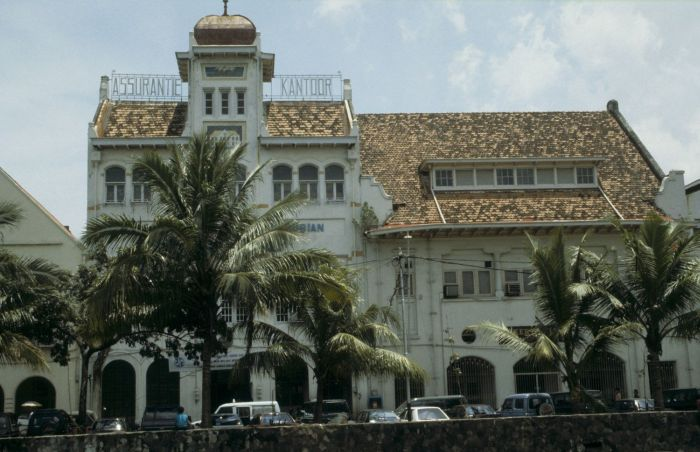
The former office of an insurance company on the east side of Kali Besar

The growth of Kali Besar being the center of commerce resulting in the presence of the church and the market disappeared. Its position as a trading center nearly displaced by the completion of the Tanjung Priok port in 1885 which is just 10 kilometres (6.2 mi) from Kali Besar. Malaria outbreaks made this region no longer conducive for new businesses. Since 1900, many employers moved out to Noordwijk straat and Rijswijk straat further to the south of Old Town.
