= Oey Thai Lo =

Chinese-Indonesian tycoon

Letnan Cina Oey Thai Lo (also known as Oey Thoa or Oey Se) was a notable Chinese-Indonesian tycoon who acted as a pachter (tax farmer) for tobacco in the early 19th century.

== Early life ==
He was born in Hokkien province in 1788 and died in Batavia in 1838. He is the father of Betawi playboy Oey Tamba Sia, grandfather of bureaucrat and landlord Kapitan Cina Oey Giok Koen, and ancestor of the Oey family of Tigaraksa, a family of the cabang atas Peranakan aristocracy of colonial Indonesia.

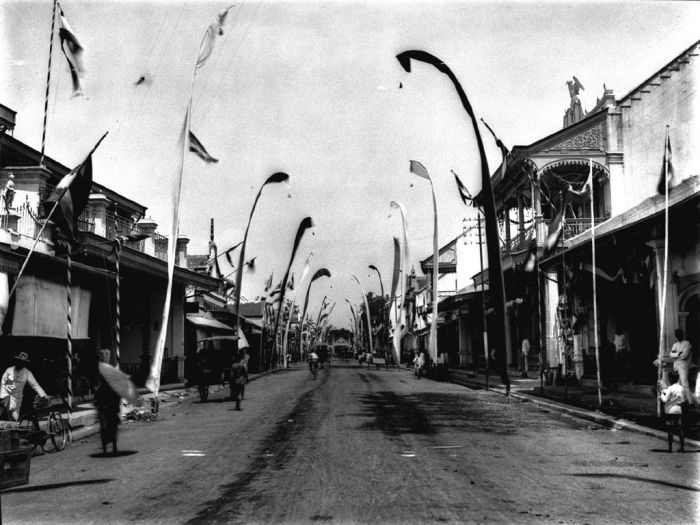
The atmosphere of Pekalongan Chinatown

Oey Thai Lo migrated to Pekalongan, Java, the Dutch East Indies around 1810. According to his descendant Oey Kwie Djien, Oey Thai Lo was the son of a poor Chinese barber.

== Career ==
Local folklore states that Oey Thai Lo found Dutch debt securities at the house of a poor, Javanese farmer. He exchanged the securities for money, which gave him the initial capital for his tobacco business empire.

According to Thio Tjin Boen's Tjerita Oeij Se, Oey Thai Lo moved from Pekalongan to Batavia because of the embarrassment of his daughter's inter-ethnic marriage to an indigenous man, namely the son of the Regent of Pekalongan, which was frowned upon by the local Chinese community. In Batavia, Oey was known for philanthropy and eventually became friends with Tan Eng Goan, Majoor der Chinezen, head of the Chinese government administration in Batavia. Oey provided financial support to the Majoor, who had financial difficulties. Because of his services to the Majoor and his charity work towards for people of Batavia, Oey Thai Lo was given the position of Luitenant der Chinezen in the Kongsi Besar area.

== Legacy ==
Oey married a local Peranakan woman, who gave birth to a daughter and three sons: Oey Holland, Oey Tamba and Oey Macau.

Luitenant Oey Thai Lo died around 1838 in Batavia, and passed down a supposed inheritance of 2 million guilders for his children. One of his children, Oey Tamba Sia, gained notoriety for his womanizing, and more fatally for masterminding several murders, which he tried to impute to his social rival Lim Soe Keng Sia, the Majoor's son-in-law. After he was convicted, the young Oey was sentenced to hang by the Dutch East Indies government.

The life story of Luitenant Oey Thai Lo and his son Oey Tamba Sia formed the basis of many Chinese-Malay literary works, and are part of Betawi folklore.

Through his youngest son, Oey Macau Sia, Luitenant Oey Thai Lo is the grandfather of Oey Giok Koen, who served as Kapitein der Chinezen of Tangerang and bought the particuliere land (private domain) of Tigaraksa. Today, descendants of Luitenant Oey Thai Lo are the owners of the Tigaraksa and Sintesa conglomerates in Indonesia.
