= Oey Bian Kong =

Chinese-Indonesian bureaucrat (died 1802/03)

Oey Biang Kong, Kapitein der Chinezen
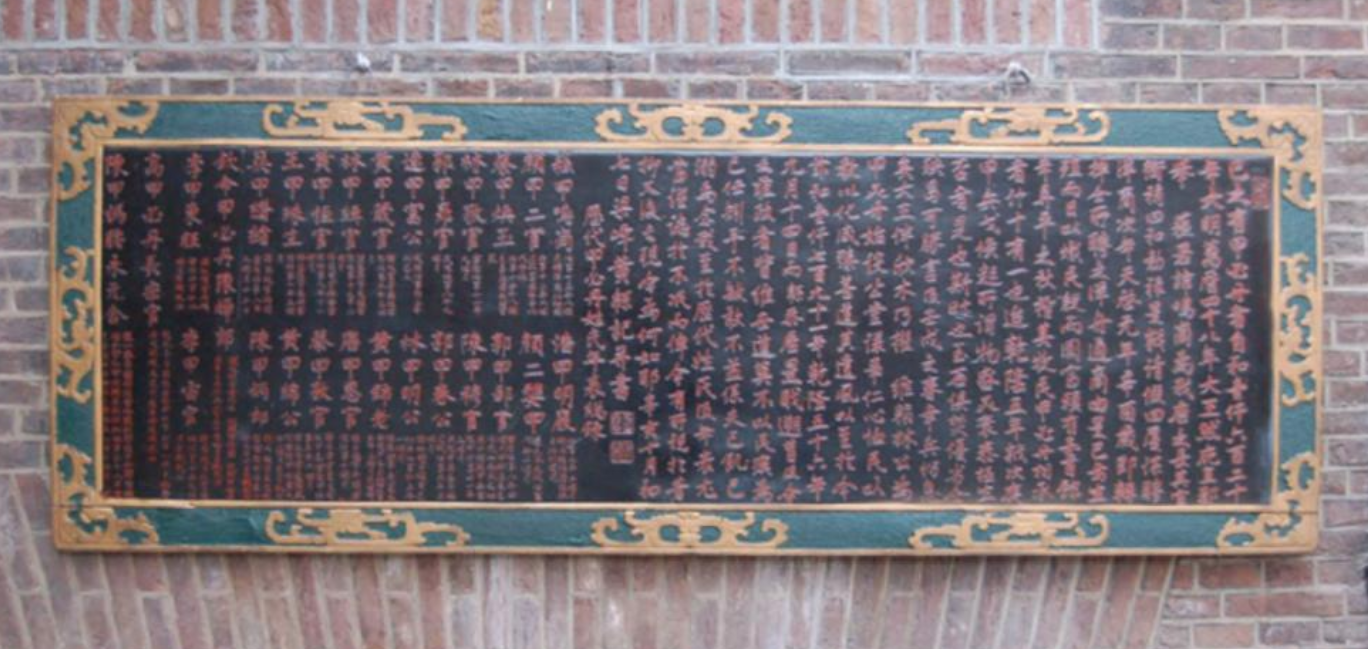
- Commemorative panel, commissioned by Oey Bian Kong, Kapitein der Chinezen to mark his accession in 1791 (now at Leiden University)

20th Kapitein der Chinezen of Batavia
- In office 1791–1800
- Preceded by: Kapitein Ong Tjoe Seng
- Succeeded by: Kapitein Gouw Tjang Sie
- Constituency: Batavia

Personal details
- Died: Between 17 December 1802 and 22 March 1803 (source: Dr. de Haan) Batavia, Dutch East Indies
- Spouse: Han Tjet Nio
- Relations: Oey Liauw Kong, Kapitein der Chinezen (grandson); Oey Kim Tjiang, Kapitein der Chinezen (great-grandson); Oey Hok Tjiang, Kapitein der Chinezen (great-grandson)
- Children: Oey Liam Kong, Kapitein der Chinezen (son)
- Parent: Oey Tje, Kapitein der Chinezen (father)
- Occupation: Kapitein der Chinezen

Chinese name
- Traditional Chinese: 黃綿光
- Simplified Chinese: 黄绵光
- Hokkien POJ: Ûiⁿ Biân Kong
Transcriptions
Standard Mandarin
- Hanyu Pinyin: Huáng Mián Guāng
- Bopomofo: ㄏㄨㄤˊ ㄇㄧㄢˊ ㄍㄨㄤ
- Gwoyeu Romatzyh: Hwang Mian Guang
Southern Min
- Hokkien POJ: Ûiⁿ Biân Kong

Oey Bian Kong, Kapitein der Chinezen (Chinese: 黃綿光; Pe̍h-ōe-jī: Ûiⁿ Biân Kong) was a prominent Chinese-Indonesian bureaucrat who served from 1791 until 1800 as the 20th Kapitein der Chinezen of Batavia (now Jakarta, capital of Indonesia), and the last under the Dutch East India Company, which was dissolved in 1799. This post was the most senior in the Chinese civil bureaucracy that governed the local Chinese community as part of the Dutch colonial system of 'indirect rule'.

== Life ==
Born in Java, Oey was the son of the poet-bureaucrat Oey Tje, who was installed as Kapitein der Chinezen of Semarang, Central Java in 1753. Oey Bian Kong's career as a bureaucrat started with his appointment as Boedelmeester, or State Trustee for insolvent estates, by a Resolution of June 1, 1778. He was raised to the post and title of Luitenant der Chinezen by a Resolution of November 26, 1784.

In 1791, Oey was further elevated to the post and title of Kapitein der Chinezen in succession to the outgoing Kapitein Ong Tjoe Seng. Oey's appointment was approved by Willem Arnold Alting, Governor-General of the Dutch East Indies. To mark his installation in 1791, Oey commissioned the oldest of the eight surviving commemorative plaques of the Kong Koan, or Chinese Council, of Batavia, now conserved at Leiden University. In the words of historian Leonard Blussé: 'He wished to show the full pedigree of the captains who had held office before him'. The text begins by extolling Kapitein Souw Beng Kong, the first in the 'pedigree', then highlights the re-establishment of authority following the Chinese Massacre of 1740 and the ongoing Java War of 1741 to 1743 under Kapitein Lim Beng Ko, appointed in 1743, and the Kong Koan, newly reconstituted and recognised as an official government body in 1742. Kapitein Oey Bian Kong's plaque then declares: 'following the examples set by his illustrious predecessors, he will devote himself to the well-being of his people.'

In 1800, due to old age and failing health, Kapitein Oey Bian Kong submitted his request to the Dutch authorities, first for a resignation, and secondly for the appointment of his son, Oey Kam Sing, as Boedelmeester. By a Resolution of December 27, 1800 under Governor-General Pieter Gerardus van Overstraten, both requests were duly granted. According to Dr de Haan, the old Kapitein died between December 17, 1802 and March 22, 1803.

== Family and descendants ==
Kapitein Oey Bian Kong was survived by his widow, Han Tjiet Nio, and at least two sons, Boedelmeester Oey Kam Sing and Oey Liam Kong, Kapitein der Chinezen. His grandson through the latter, Kapitein Oey Liauw Kong, was a prominent Chinese officer and member of the Kong Koan between 1841 and 1849, as were his great-grandsons, Kapitein Oey Kim Tjiang and Kapitein Oey Hok Tjiang. His family maintained its position in the Chinese officership until the early twentieth century in the person of his great-great-grandson, Luitenant Oey Keng Hien, who was in office from 1899 until 1903.

Government offices
Preceded by Kapitein Ong Tjoe Seng	20th Kapitein der Chinezen of Batavia; 1791–1800	Succeeded by Kapitein Gouw Tjang Sie
