= Thio Tjin Boen =

Chinese-Indonesian author (1885–1940)

Thio Tjin Boen (Chinese: 張振文; pinyin: Zhāng Zhènwén; Pe̍h-ōe-jī: Tiuⁿ Chín-bûn; 1885–1940) was a Chinese-Indonesian writer of Malay-language fiction and a journalist.

== Biography ==
Born in Pekalongan, Central Java, in 1885, Thio is recorded as working at various newspapers in the early 1900s. This included Taman Sari, Warna Warta, and Perniagaan (the latter from 1927 to 1929). In this position Thio held a variety of roles, including editor, translator, and writer. He is also known to have established his own publication, Asia, but the newspaper was not long lived.

He is best remembered as a novelist. His first novel, Tjerita Oeij Se, was published in 1903 and followed a young trader named Oeij Se who, after acquiring extensive wealth, was corrupted by it. The novel had a distinctly anti-Islamic overtone, as Oeij Se's punishment for his transgressions is that his daughter converts to Islam (the religion of the Javanese majority). In the novel, Indonesian scholar of literature Jakob Sumardjo finds a condemnation of ethnic Chinese assimilation along the matrilineal line (with the wife as Chinese and husband is of another race), placing such persons in a state of ambiguity. The story was inspired by the real life of the tobacco tycoon Oey Thai Lo. Thio also published the related novel, Tambahsia: Soewatoe tjerita jang betoel soedah kedjadian di Betawi antara tahoen 1851-1856, based on the life of Oey Thai Lo's son, Oey Tamba Sia and his competition with Lim Soe Keng Sia.

Thio's next novel, Tjerita Njai Soemirah (1917), reversed the roles: in both volumes of this novel, an ethnic Chinese man falls in love and marries a native Indonesian girl. Sinologist Leo Suryadinata writes that this suggests Thio had either changed his position on interethnic marriages or considered such relations acceptable when the male was Chinese. Another sinologist, Myra Sidharta, writes that the novel is likewise filled with criticisms of both the Javanese and Chinese worlds.

Several other novels were written by Thio, including Dengan Doewa Cent Djadi Kaja (1920) and Tan Fa Lioeng, atawa, Moestadjabnja sinsche Hong Soei (1922). Thio died in Bandung, West Java, in 1940.

== Legacy ==
According to Sidharta, Thio's unique aspect as a writer was his willingness to show ethnic Chinese in their interactions with native ethnic groups. Thio's novel Tjerita Oeij Se was included in the first volume of Kesastraan Melayu Tionghoa dan Kebangsaan Indonesia, an anthology of Chinese Malay literature, in 2000. The following year two of his novels, Tjerita Njai Soemirah and Dengan Doewa Cent Djadi Kaja, were included in the second volume. These reprintings adapted the 1972 spelling reform and were given footnotes to clarify obscure terms.

== Works cited ==
- A.S., Marcus; Benedanto, Pax, eds. (2001). Kesastraan Melayu Tionghoa dan Kebangsaan Indonesia [Chinese Malay Literature and the Indonesian Nation] (in Indonesian). Vol. 2. Jakarta: Kepustakaan Populer Gramedia. ISBN 978-979-9023-45-2.
- Sidharta, Myra (2001). "Pengantar" [Foreword]. In A.S., Marcus; Benedanto, Pax (eds.). Kesastraan Melayu Tionghoa dan Kebangsaan Indonesia [Chinese Malay Literature and the Indonesian Nation] (in Indonesian). Vol. 2. Jakarta: Kepustakaan Populer Gramedia. pp. xv–xxiii. ISBN 978-979-9023-45-2.
- Sumardjo, Jakob (2004). Kesusastraan Melayu Rendah [Low Malay Literature] (in Indonesian). Yogyakarta: Galang Press. ISBN 978-979-3627-16-8.
- Suryadinata, Leo (1993). "From Peranakan Chinese Literature to Indonesian Literature: A Preliminary Study". Chinese Adaptation and Diversity: Essays on Society and Literature in Indonesia, Malaysia & Singapore. Singapore: National University of Singapore Press. pp. 101–119. ISBN 978-9971-69-186-8.
- Suryadinata, Leo (1995). Prominent Indonesian Chinese: Biographical Sketches. Singapore: Institute of Southeast Asian Studies. ISBN 978-981-3055-04-9.
- "Thio Tjin Boen". Encyclopedia of Jakarta (in Indonesian). Jakarta City Government. Archived from the original on 4 March 2016.
