= Tan Eng Goan =

Majoor Tan Eng Goan
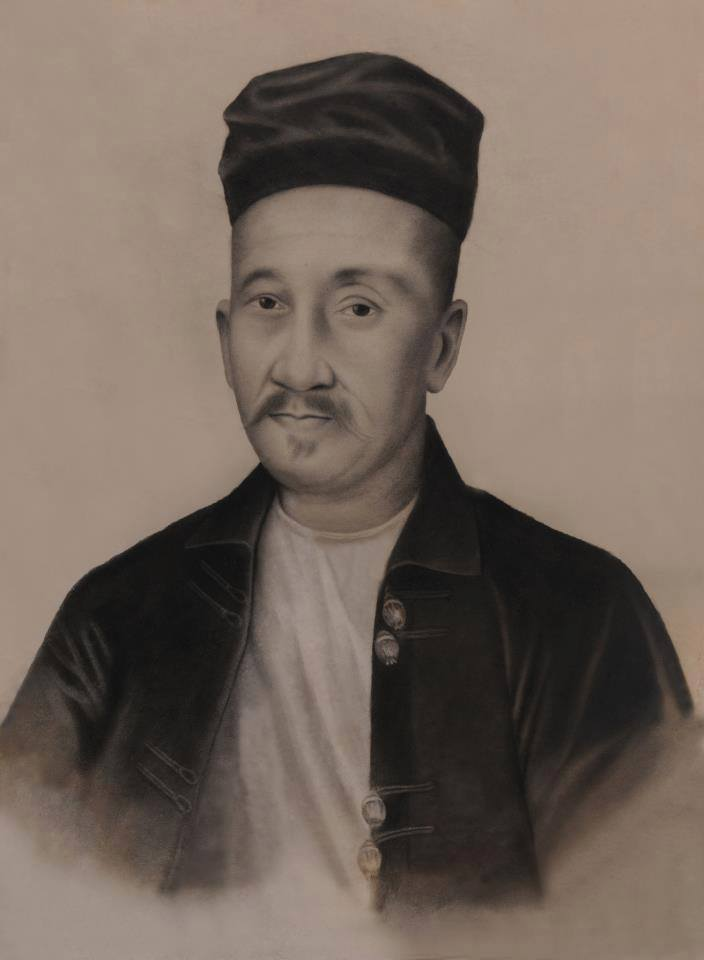
- Portrait of Tan Eng Goan; 1st Majoor der Chinezen of Batavia; Mid-19th century (Leiden University)

Kapitein der Chinezen of Batavia
- In office 1829–1837
- Preceded by: Kapitein Ko Tiang Tjong
- Succeeded by: Elevation to Majoor der Chinezen
- Constituency: Batavia

Majoor der Chinezen of Batavia
- In office 1837–1865
- Preceded by: New creation
- Succeeded by: Majoor Tan Tjoen Tiat
- Constituency: Batavia

Personal details
- Born: c. 1802 Batavia, Dutch East Indies
- Died: 17 September 1872 Patoakan, Batavia, Dutch East Indies
- Spouse: Lie Pien Nio
- Relations: Lim Soe Keng Sia (son-in-law); Kapitein Tan Jap Long (uncle); Tan Liok Tiauw (great-grandson)
- Children: Kapitein Tan Soe Tjong (son); Tan Bit Nio (daughter)
- Parent: Kapitein Tan Peeng Ko (father)
- Occupation: Majoor der Chinezen, bureaucrat

Chinese name
- Chinese: 陳永元
- Hokkien POJ: Tân Éng Goân
Transcriptions
Standard Mandarin
- Hanyu Pinyin: Chén Yǒng Yuán
- Bopomofo: ㄔㄣˊ ㄩㄥˇ ㄩㄢˊ
- Gwoyeu Romatzyh: Chern Yeong Yuan
Southern Min
- Hokkien POJ: Tân Éng Goân

Tan Eng Goan, 1st Majoor der Chinezen (Chinese: 陳永元; Pe̍h-ōe-jī: Tân Éng Goân; 1802 – 17 September 1872) was a high-ranking bureaucrat who served as the first Majoor der Chinezen of Batavia (now Jakarta), capital of colonial Indonesia. This was the highest-ranking Chinese position in the civil administration of the Dutch East Indies.

== Life ==
=== Background and early career ===
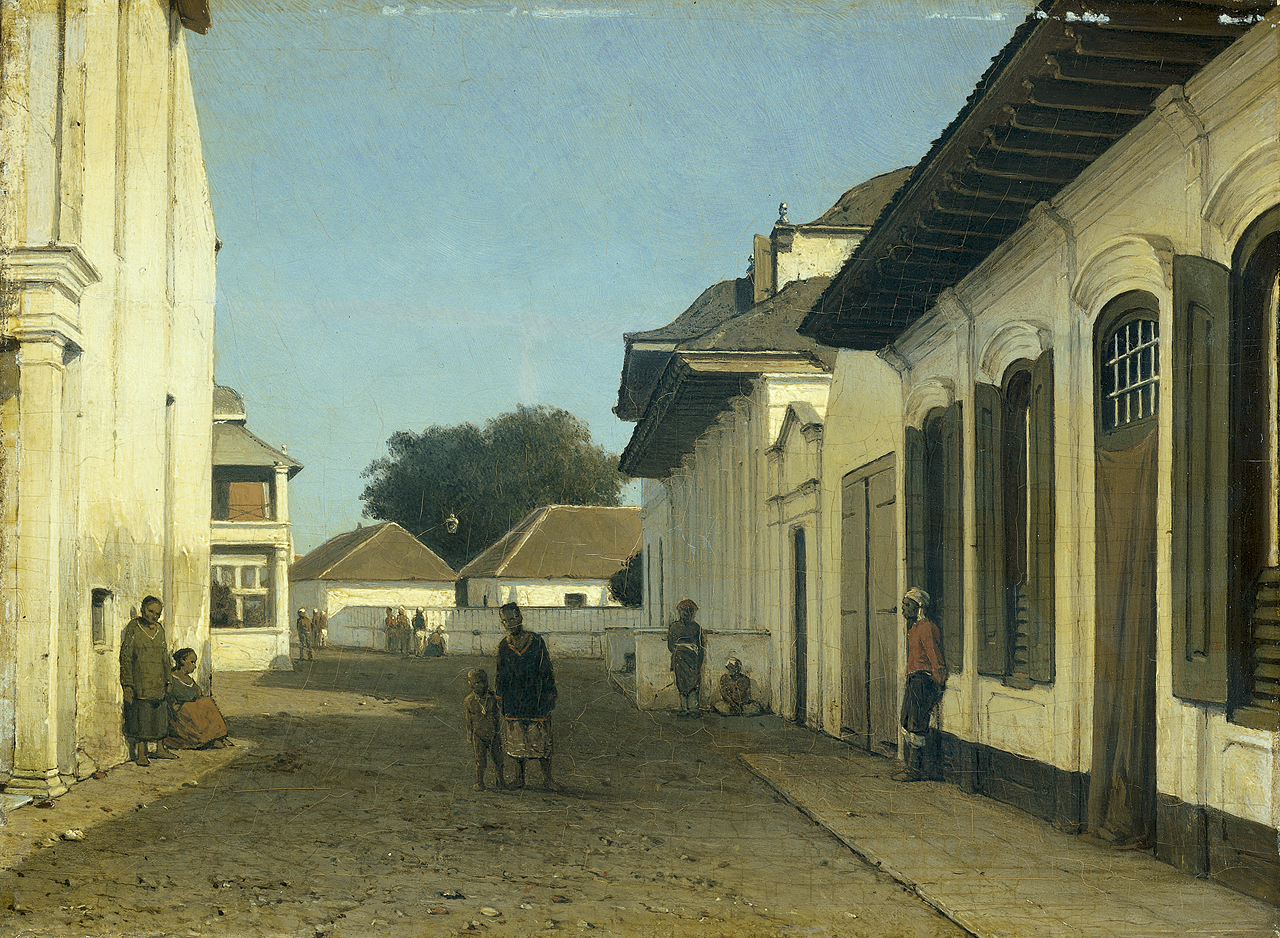
A painting of Batavia in 1860 by Jan Weissenbruch

Born in 1802, Majoor Tan Eng Goan came from an old family of the Cabang Atas aristocracy of colonial Indonesia. Many members of his family served as Chinese officers, part of the civil administration of the Dutch colonial government. He was the son of Kapitein Tan Peeng Ko (Luitenant in Batavia from 1792 to 1809 and Kapitein from 1809 to 1812), and a nephew of Kapitein Tan Jap Long (appointed Luitenant in 1810, and Kapitein in 1811). Both Tan's father and uncle thus served as Chinese headmen and presided over the Chinese Council of Batavia.

Tan was married at least four times, including in 1819 to his first wife, Lie Pien Nio, a great-niece of the then incumbent presiding Chinese officer, Kapitein der Chinezen Lie Tieuw Kong, who had succeeded Tan's father and uncle in the same post. Tan's uncle-in-law held office from 1812 until 1821.

As the issue of Chinese officers, Tan Eng Goan bore the hereditary title 'Sia' from birth until his elevation to the rank of a Luitenant on 15 February 1827. This promotion was made by Léonard Pierre Joseph, Viscount du Bus de Gisignies, the recently appointed 8th Governor-General of the Dutch East Indies; and was duly noted in a sitting of the Chinese Council on 9 March 1827.

=== Captaincy and Mayoralty ===
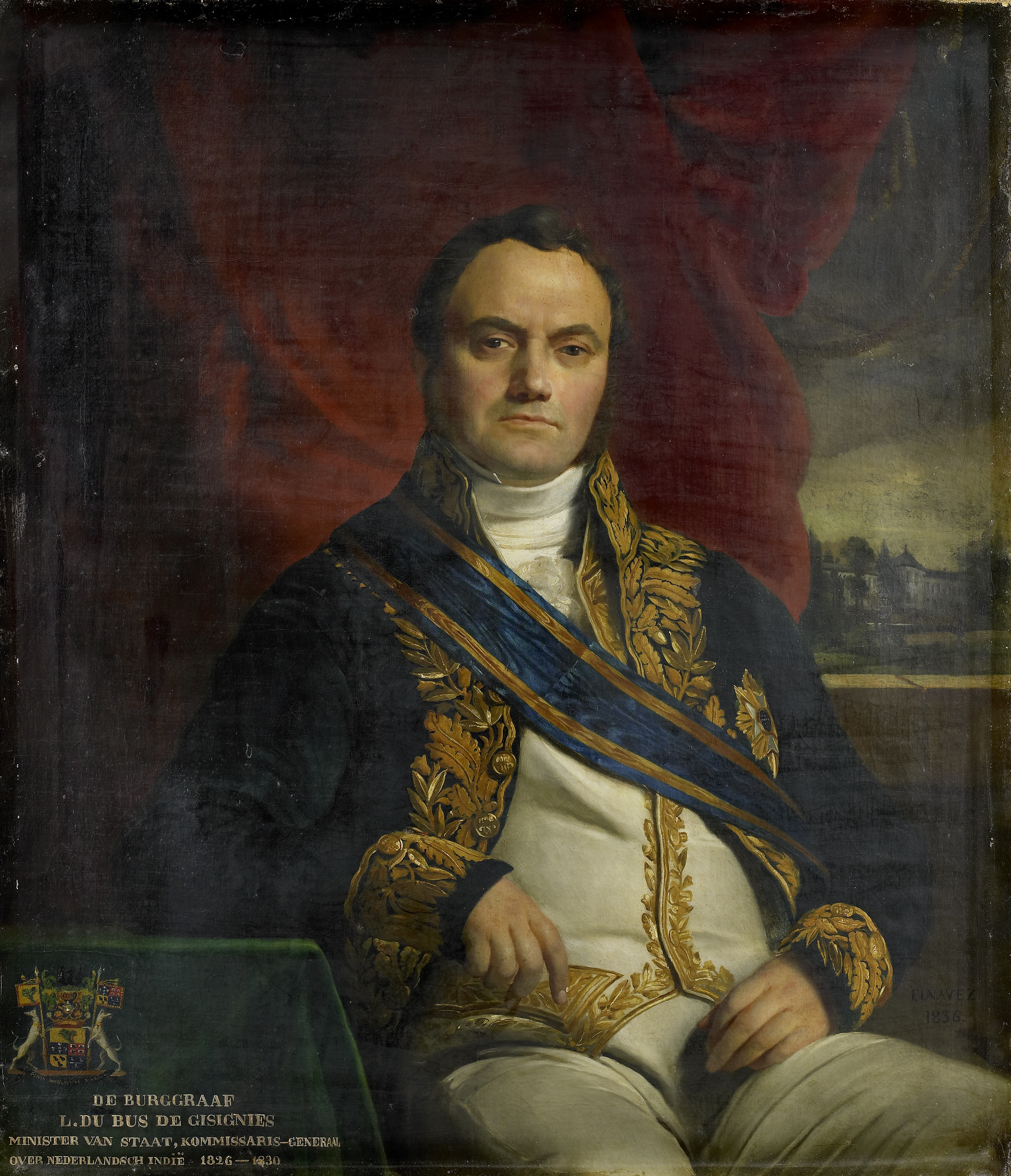
Viscount du Bus de Gisignies, Governor-General at the time of Tan's elevation to the Captaincy

In 1829, when the presiding Chinese headman Ko Tiang Tjong was forced to resign from the post of Kapitein der Chinezen of Batavia, Tan - despite only having held the briefest tenure of all sitting officers - was appointed to the Chinese Captaincy. In so doing, he became the head of the Chinese community in Batavia in succession to his father, uncle and great-uncle-in-law. At that time in Batavia, the post of Kapitein der Chinezen was the highest-ranking Chinese position in the colonial administration.

On 21 September 1837, Kapitein Tan Eng Goan was further raised to the newly created post of Majoor der Chinezen of Batavia by Dominique Jacques de Eerens, the 11th Governor-General. Tan's two Luitenants, Oey Eng Liok and Jap Soan Kong, were both elevated a year later to the higher rank of Kapitein. As Kapitein, then as Majoor, Tan was also the ex officio Chairman of the Chinese Council of Batavia (Dutch: Chinese Raad; Malay: Kong Koan), the highest Chinese governmental body in the colony.

The Majoor's family owned the particuliere landen or private domains of Kramat, Kapoek, Tandjoeng Boeroeng and Rawa Kidang in Tangerang. From 1848 until 1862, Majoor Tan Eng Goan also held a series of pachts or revenue farms over such diverse things as arak, rum, tobacco and wayang. Despite his landed wealth and revenue farms, Tan's income fell short of the exalted style of living expected of a Chinese officer.

== Tenure as Majoor and Kapitein ==
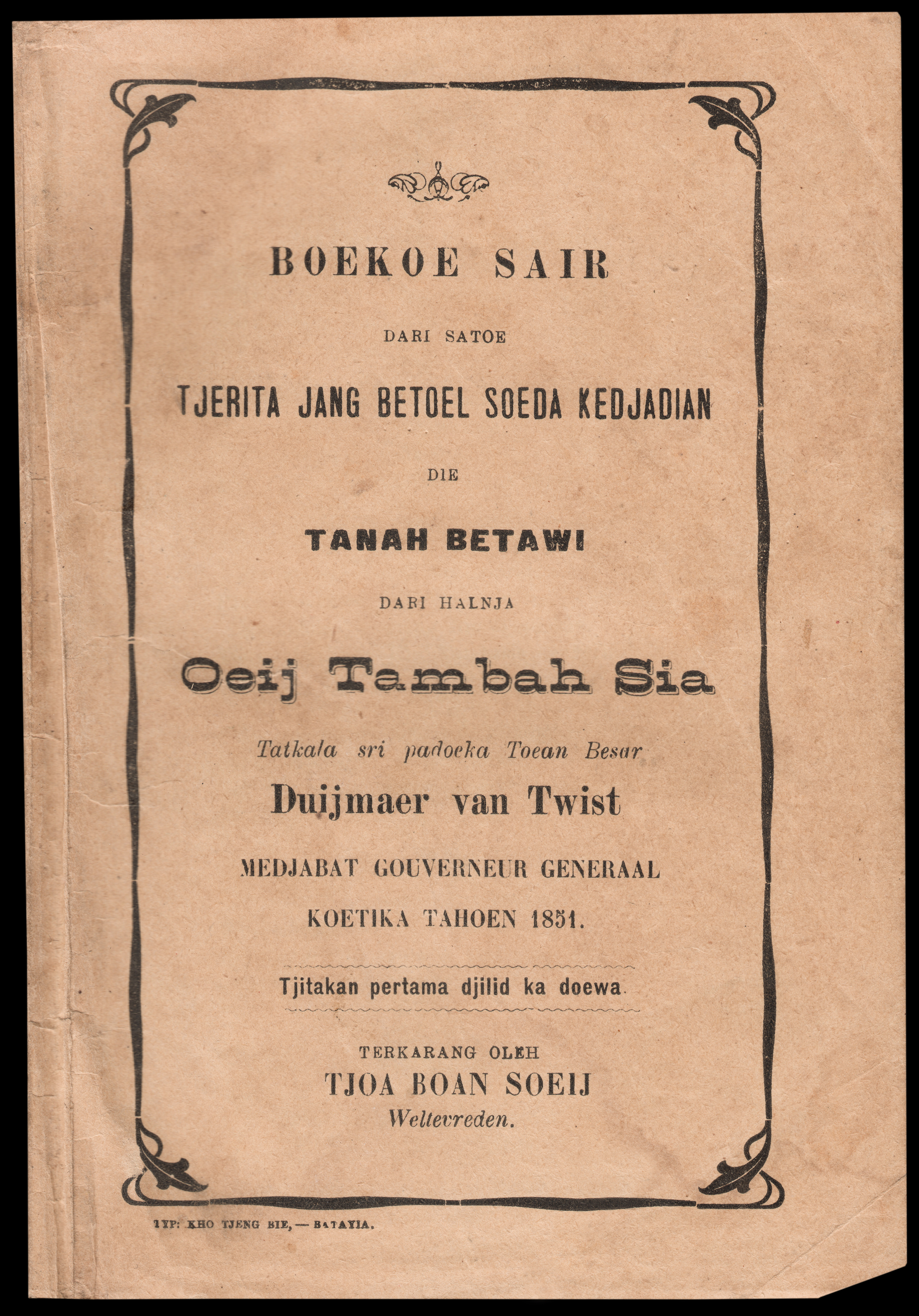
Oeij Tambah Sia (first edition, second volume) by Tjoa Boan Soeij.

In the late 1820s, Kapitein Tan Eng Goan initiated an annual pasar malam, or night market, held in Batavia three days prior to Lunar New Year. This was among the earliest and biggest of Batavia's organized night markets, and served as a prototype for similar and later markets elsewhere.

Tan's tenure as a Chinese officer was affected by his declining family finances, which forced him to patronise Batavia's foremost tobacco magnate, Oey Thai Lo. In return for Oey's financial support, Tan recommended the nouveau riche Oey for an elevation to the purely honorary rank of Luitenant-titulair der Chinezen, which gave the tobacco tycoon the respectability he craved.

Tan's debt and financial reliance on Oey, however, prevented him from acting with authority when restraining the wayward and disrespectful behaviour of the latter' son, the notorious playboy Oey Tamba Sia (1827-1856). Oey Tamba Sia eventually developed an intense rivalry with the Majoor's son-in-law, Lim Soe Keng Sia, with eventually murderous consequences.

The younger Oey masterminded a series of murders, and unsuccessfully attempted to implicate Lim in these crimes. Although Lim was acquitted, his rival Oey - a wealthy member of the city's Chinese establishment - was found guilty and executed by public hanging in 1856. The scandal severely damaged the standing and authority of the Majoor in the eyes of the Chinese community. Even Tan's immediate subordinates in the Chinese Council, notably Kapitein Tan Tjoen Tiat and Luitenant The Kim Houw, were disappointed in the Majoor's meek handling of the case of Oey Tamba Sia.

The Majoor's financial situation further deteriorated after the Oey case, which led him to sell the estates of Kramat and Kapoek in the 1860s to his eventual successor, Kapitein Tan Tjoen Tiat.

== Resignation and death ==
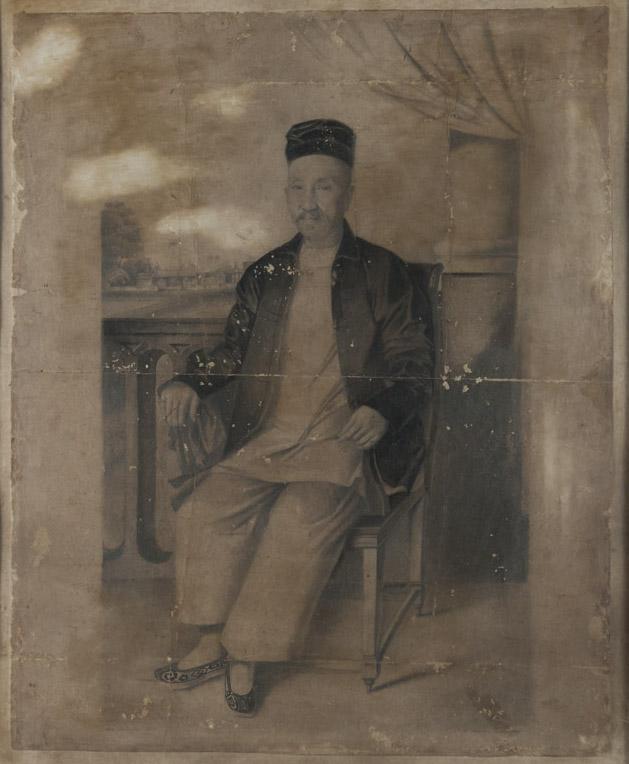
Early to mid-19th century portrait of Tan Eng Goan, 1st Majoor der Chinezen of Batavia

Majoor Tan Eng Goan served in office until 1865, when, due to his old age and fragile health, he requested and was granted an honourable discharge from his duties by the colonial authorities. He also attempted without success to secure the succession of his adoptive son, Kapitein Tan Soe Tjong, to the Chinese Mayoralty.

The former Majoor was allowed to retain his title on an honorary basis following his resignation. Given Tan's long service and precarious finances, the colonial government further awarded him a pension of 150 guilders per month.

Majoor Tan Eng Goan died on 17 September 1872 in Patoakan, Batavia, and was buried in Slipi. His adoptive son, Kapitein Tan Soe Tjong had predeceased him the previous year, on 20 June 1871. Majoor Tan Eng Goan also had a daughter, Tan Bit Nio, who was married to Lim Soe Keng Sia. Through them, the Majoor was a grandfather of Lim Hong Nio and a great-grandfather of the prominent landlord and community leader Tan Liok Tiauw (1872 - 1947).

== Significance ==
Tan is remembered today as the first sitting Majoor der Chinezen of Batavia, arguably the most important Chinese officership in colonial Indonesia. In office for some 37 years as Kapitein, then Majoor, Tan was also the longest-serving head of the Chinese Council and of the Chinese community of Batavia.

Majoor Tan Eng Goan is also remembered today for his poor handling of the case of Oey Tamba Sia. Oey's murderous rivalry with the Majoor's son-in-law, Lim Soe Keng Sia, became part of Jakarta folklore, and formed the basis of many literary works in Malay, including Thio Tjin Boen's Tambahsia: Soewatoe tjerita jang betoel soedah kedjadian di Betawi antara tahoen 1851-1856 (published in 1903) and Tjoa Boan Soeij's Sair swatoe tjeritajang betoel soeda kedjadian di Tanah Betawi dari halnja Oeij Tambah Sia, tatkalah Sri Padoeka toean besar Duymaer van Twist mendjabat Gouverneur General koetika tahoen 1851 (published in 1906) and Tambah Sia (published in 1922).

As recently as 2013, the saga of the Majoor, his son-in-law and their rivalry with Oey provided part of the inspiration for Atilah Soeryadjaya's musical, Ariah.

Government offices
Preceded by Kapitein Ko Tiang Tjong	Kapitein der Chinezen of Batavia; 1829–1837	Elevation to Majoor der Chinezen
New title	Majoor der Chinezen of Batavia; 1837 – 1865	Succeeded by Majoor Tan Tjoen Tiat
