= Oey Tamba Sia =

Chinese-Indonesian playboy hanged by the Dutch colonial government

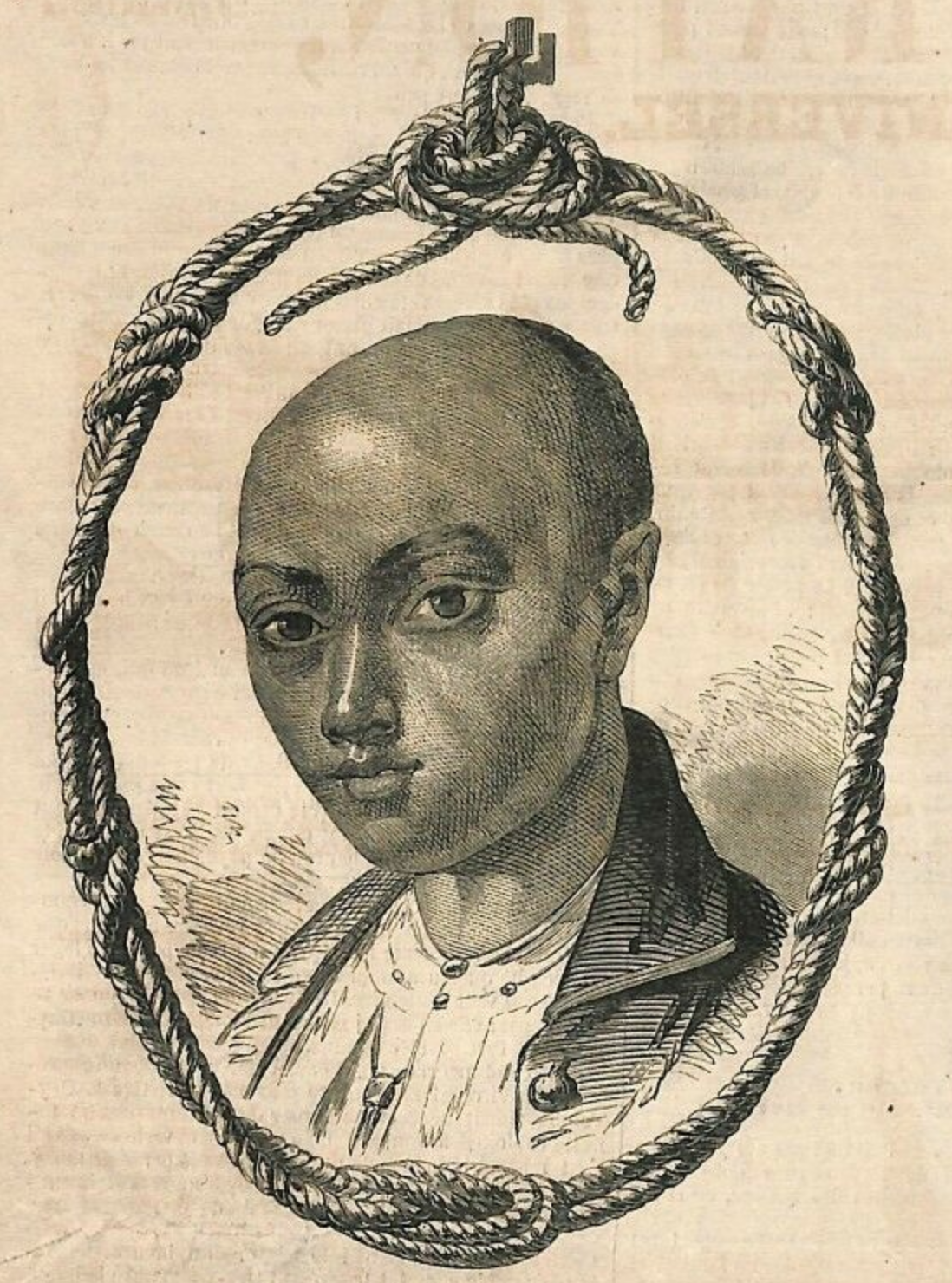
- An engraving of Oey Tamba Sia in the French magazine L'Illustration (1857), based on a drawing by M. G. de Coudray
- Born: 1827; Pekalongan, Central Java, Dutch East Indies
- Died: 1856 (aged 28–29); Batavia, Dutch East Indies
- Cause of death: Execution by hanging
- Occupation: Playboy
- Spouse: Sim Hong Nio
- Partners: Mas Ajoe Goendjing; Liesie; Liem Ing Nio
- Parent: Luitenant Oey Thai Lo (father)
- Relatives: Oey Makau Sia (brother); Kapitein Oey Giok Koen (nephew)

Oey Tamba Sia (1827 – October 7, 1856), also spelt Oeij Tambah Sia, or often mistakenly Oey Tambahsia, was a rich, Chinese-Indonesian playboy hanged by the Dutch colonial government due to his involvement in a number of murder cases in Batavia, now Jakarta, capital of colonial Indonesia. His life has become part of Jakarta folklore, and inspired numerous literary works.

== Life ==
Born in 1827, Oey was the son of Oey Thai Lo, also known as Oey Thoa, a Chinese-born tycoon and tobacco magnate, originally from Pekalongan, Central Java, who had been appointed Luitenant der Chinezen of Kongsi Besar in Batavia. This was a civil government position in the colonial bureaucracy with legal and political jurisdiction over the local Chinese community. As the son of a Chinese officer, Oey Tamba held the hereditary title of Sia; and his family belonged to the Cabang Atas or the traditional Chinese establishment of colonial Indonesia.

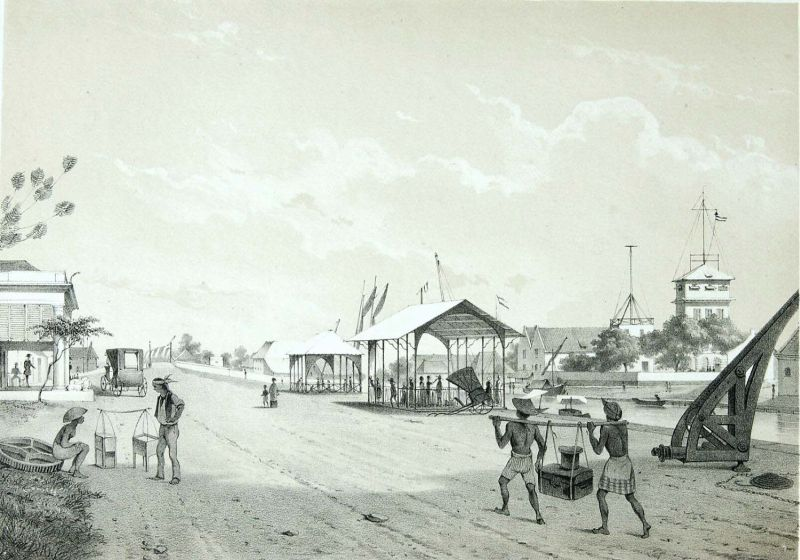
A litograph of Batavia, based on a drawing by C. Deeleman (1859).

Aged 15 years old, Oey Tamba Sia lost his father, Luitenant Oey Thai Lo, who died in 1838, leaving his children a large fortune that supposedly amounted to 2 million guilders. Local folklore has it that, although handsome and fashionable, the young Oey was an arrogant young man and a notorious womanizer - character flaws that were compounded by his enviable inheritance. Oey was married to Sim Hong Nio.

The late colonial writer Phoa Kian Sioe alleges that Oey was dismissive of the city's Chinese officers, who were his late father's friends and colleagues in the colonial bureaucracy. In particular, Oey was disrespectful towards Tan Eng Goan, 1st Majoor der Chinezen of Batavia, head of the city's Chinese community, because the latter had relied on Oey's father for financial support. According to Phoa, Oey spurned the exasperated Majoor's Confucian exhortations for gentlemanly behaviour and his offer of a Chinese lieutenancy. Oey developed instead a fierce rivalry with the Majoor's son-in-law, Lim Soe Keng Sia.

Oey ordered the killing of Sutedjo, brother of his concubine Mas Adjeng Goendjing, whom he mistakenly thought was her lover. Oey also masterminded the poisoning of his servant Oey Tjeng Kie in order to implicate his rival, Lim Soe Keng Sia. Although Lim, the Majoor's son-in-law, was initially and scandalously apprehended by the authorities, further police and court investigations revealed Oey as the mastermind of both murders.

The Landraad (or criminal court) sentenced Oey Tamba Sia to death by public hanging. Oey's family attempted an appeal to the Raad van Justitie (or high court) and for clemency from the Governor-General, both of which were rejected.

At dawn on October 7, 1856, Oey Tamba Sia was hanged to death on Batavia's main town square in front of the Stadhuis, or town hall (now the Jakarta History Museum).

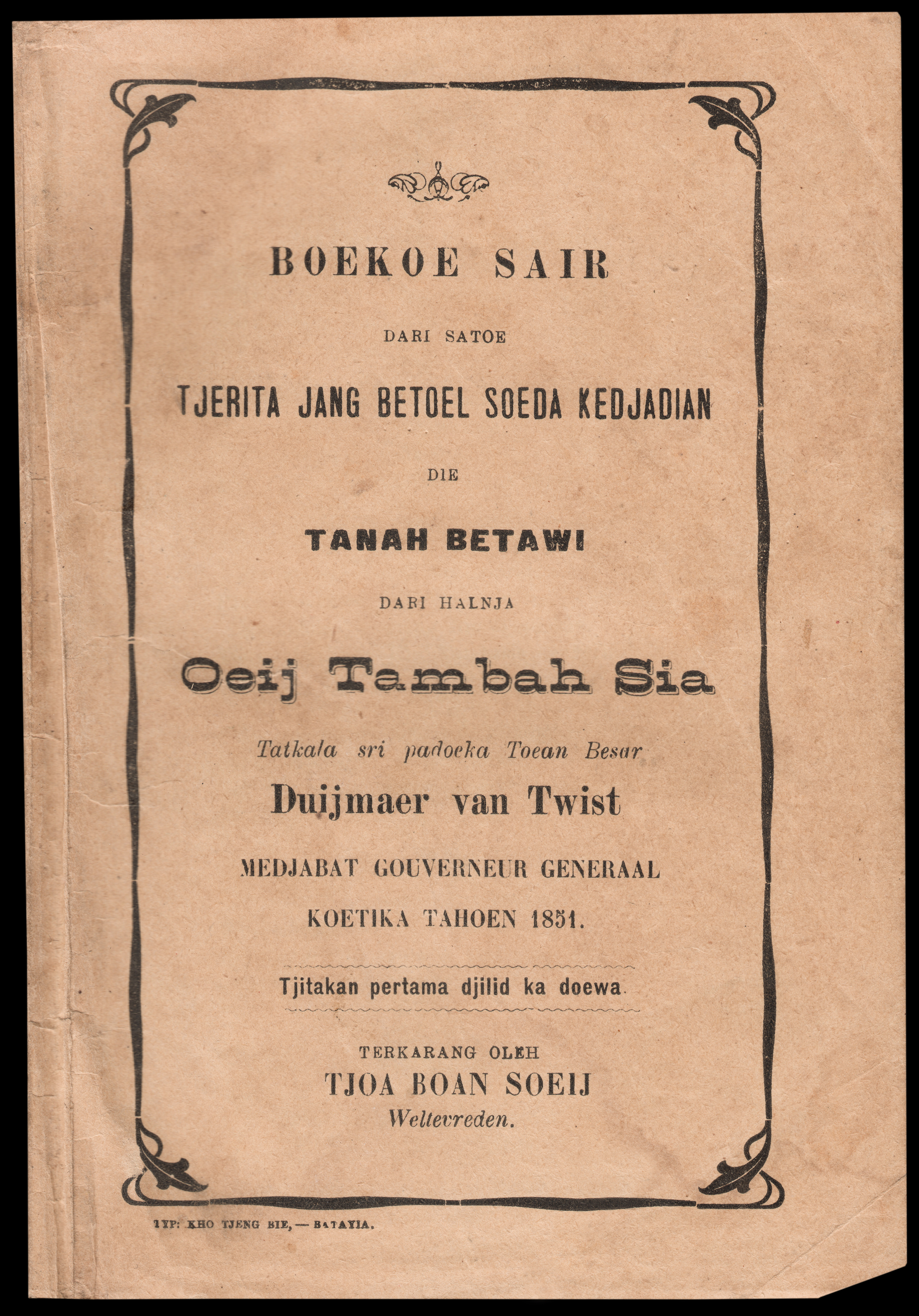
Tjoa Boan Soeij's Oeij Tambah Sia (first edition, second volume)

== Cultural and literary significance ==
The case of Oey Tamba Sia scandalized colonial Jakarta because it involved figures from the very heart of the city's Chinese establishment, including Oey himself, his rival Lim and the latter's father-in-law, Majoor Tan Eng Goan. The scandal attracted international media attention at the time, and was — for instance — covered in a lengthy news article in the French magazine L'Illustration (1857).

The rivalry between Oey and Lim further was seen in subsequent literature as a cautionary tale of lack of Confucian virtue, which necessitated a reestablishment of the Confucian ethical and social order. The scandal inspired a series of folk stories, poems and novellas in the Dutch East Indies, and became part of Jakarta folklore, as well as the Chinese-Indonesian collective memory.

In 1903, Thio Tjin Boen published Tambahsia: Soewatoe tjerita jang betoel soedah kedjadian di Betawi antara tahoen 1851-1856, based on Oey's life. Not long after, in 1906, Tjoa Boan Soeij published a story in verse, entitled Sair swatoe tjeritajang betoel soeda kedjadian di Tanah Betawi dari halnja Oeij Tambah Sia, tatkalah Sri Padoeka toean besar Duymaer van Twist mendjabat Gouverneur General koetika tahoen 1851. Tjoa published another work in 1922 based on Oey's life, called Tambah Sia.

In 1956, the historian and writer Phoa Kian Sioe published Sedjarahnja Souw Beng Kong (tangan-kanannja G.G. Jan Pieterszoon Coen), Phoa Beng Gan (achli pengairan dalam tahun 1648), Oey Tamba Sia (hartawan mati ditiang penggantungan), a collection of historical anecdotes about the Chinese community of Jakarta.

Oey's life also partly inspired Atilah Soeryadjaya's 2013 musical, 'Ariah'.
