= Pacht =

The institution of the pacht or pacht-stelsel (revenue farm, pl. pachten) was a system of tax farming in the Dutch Republic and its colonial empire. In this system tax is not collected by the government, but by a private individual who has leased the right to collect the tax. In the Dutch Republic, for example, this was common practice for a long time, especially for indirect taxes. Each year, the highest bidder acquired the right to collect certain taxes; he paid a rent for this to the government, and all he collected more was for the tax tenant himself. The rationale behind this system was that by outsourcing taxation, local governments could exert less influence on collection. Also, a tenant would collect taxes more scrupulously, because it would personally benefit him.

In practice, however, there was much dissatisfaction with the tax tenants, especially among the common man. After the Pachtersoproer of 1748, the system was largely abolished in the Republic. From then on, the tax was collected through the so-called Collecte, which meant that the government appointed and controlled tax collectors.

== Pacht in the Dutch East Indies ==
The Dutch also instituted a pacht-stelsel in the Dutch East Indies (now Indonesia) and Dutch Cape Colony (now South Africa), whereby the colonial state sub-contracted the sovereign right of tax collection to pachters. It formed one of the main sources of the colonial state revenue prior to the twentieth century.

Like in the Dutch Republic the private tax collectors could extract profits on top of what was due to the authorities, and were in addition allowed to enforce their rights with private armies and intelligence agencies. The pachters usually employed administrators, the kuasa pacht, to run the day-to-day operations of their pachten. A pacht territory could be managed as a discrete unit or divided further into smaller farms, sub-contracted to sub-farmers.

The Dutch colonial authorities granted or auctioned off pachten for the sale of opium and salt, for the running of toll houses, pawnshops and gambling dens, for the collection of land, market and poll taxes, for the management of forests, and for the gathering of produce such as birds' nests, pearls, trepang and sponges. As the colonial state became more centralised, most of these revenue farms were gradually taken over by the government or state monopolies in the late nineteenth and early twentieth century.

== List of notable pachters in the Dutch East Indies ==
- Phoa Beng Gan, Kapitein der Chinezen: a mid-17th century bureaucrat and tax farmer
- Heinrich Oswald Eckstein: 18th century pachter and one of Dutch Cape Colony's wealthiest tycoons
- Ngo Ho Tjiang Kongsi: an influential consortium of early-mid 19th-century opium pachters
- Lauw Ho: one of the five partners of Ngo Ho Tjiang
- Lim Soe Keng Sia: administrator of Ngo Ho Tjiang
- Be Biauw Tjoan, Majoor-titulair der Chinezen: late 19th-century pachter and bureaucrat
- Oei Tiong Ham, Majoor-titulair der Chinezen: one of the last pachters of the Dutch East Indies
