= Landheer =

Lord or owner in Dutch East Indies

In the Dutch East Indies (now Indonesia), a Landheer (Dutch for 'landlord'; plural, Landheeren) was the lord or owner of a particuliere landerij, a private domain in a feudal system of land tenure used in parts of the colony. Dutch jurists described the legal jurisdiction of a Landheer over his domain as ‘sovereign’ and comparable to that of the rulers of indirectly ruled princely states in the Indies. By law, the Landheer possessed landsheerlijke rechten or hak-hak ketuanan [seigniorial jurisdiction] over the inhabitants of his domain — jurisdiction exercised elsewhere by the central government.

The Landheer's country seat on his domain was called a Landhuis or Rumah Kongsi. In this context, 'Kongsi' meant 'Lord' or 'his Lordship', and was a title used by the Chinese Landheeren, who were invariably scions of the Cabang Atas gentry.

== Legal and political jurisdiction ==
The legal and political jurisdiction of a Landheer was regulated by a mixture of laws and customary rules developed under the Dutch East India Company. Following the bankruptcy of the company, a series of government ordinances were issued by the new colonial government to better regulate the scope of the powers of the Landheeren: Staatsblad 1836 No. 19 and Staatsblad 1912, No. 422.

The portion of land in a particuliere landerij retained by the Landheer for his own use was called tanah kongsi (the demesne or seigniorial land), in contrast to tanah usaha, which was enfeoffed to the Landheer's tenant farmers. An administrateur was appointed to oversee the management of the Landheer's tanah kongsi.

The landsheerlijke rechten of the landlords were very extensive in scope. Instead of the colonial government, it was the Landheer who – in his domain – nominated and remunerated the local government bureaucracy. The Landheer appointed the district heads or Camat in his domain, other bureaucrats as he saw fit and, at the lowest level, village heads who (in these particuliere landerijen) went by the title of Mandor. Minor crimes committed by inhabitants of the particuliere landen were adjudicated and punished by courts set up by the Landheer. The Landheer was also responsible for the provision of education, health and other social services and public infrastructures for the inhabitants of the domain.

As part of his landsheerlijke rechten, the Landheer was entitled to certain dues from his subjects, including tjoekee or contingent, which consisted of 20% of the harvest from dependent holdings worked on by his tenant farmers. The Landheer also collected padjeg, which was his predetermined share of his tenant farmers’ harvest, fixed for a certain period of time. The collection of all these dues was overseen by officials called Potia, who were assisted by deputies called Komitier.

Also part of his landsheerlijke rechten was the Landheer's right to impose kompenian or corvee labour on his subjects, amounting to sixty days of unpaid work each year from his tenant farmers at times determined by the Landheer or his bureaucrats. Kompenian labour included work on public infrastructures, such as roads or bridges on the domain, or work on the Landheer's own tanah kongsi. By Ommelanden custom, tenant farmers were only allowed to harvest their crops after receiving the Landheer's permission.

== List of Landheeren ==
- Cornelis Chastelein (1657–1714), official of the Dutch East India Company, merchant
- Phoa Beng Gan, Kapitein der Chinezen, Chinese headman of Batavia from 1645 to 1663
- Gustaaf Willem, Baron van Imhoff (1705–1750), Governor-General from 1743 to 1750
- Jacob Mossel (1704–1761), Governor-General from 1750 to 1761
- Petrus Albertus van der Parra (1714–1775), Governor-General from 1761 to 1775
- Jeremias van Riemsdijk (1712–1777), Governor-General from 1775 to 1777
- The Han family of Lasem, Chinese officers, mid-18th century
- The Couperus family of Tjikopo: descendants of the colonial potentate Abraham Couperus (1752-1813), Governor of Dutch Malacca, including his Indo son, Petrus Theodorus Couperus, and grandson, John Ricus Couperus, landheeren of Tjikopo. The latter's son and Abraham Couperus's great-grandson was the writer Louis Couperus.
- The Lauw-Sim-Zecha family, Chinese officers and tax farmers, mid-19th century

== See also ==
- Particuliere landerij
- Manorialism
- Serfdom
- Heerlijkheid (Dutch manorialism)
- Patroon (17th century New Netherland)
