= Lim Soe Keng Sia =

Lim Soe Keng Sia (c. 1819–1883), also known as Liem Soe King Sia, Soe King Sia or Lim Soukeng Sia, was a Pachter, or revenue farmer, in Batavia, capital of the Dutch East Indies, best known for his rivalry with the notorious Betawi playboy Oey Tamba Sia. He acted as administrator of the 'Ngo Ho Tjiang' Kongsi, the most influential consortium of opium monopolists in early to mid-19th century Batavia.

== Early life ==
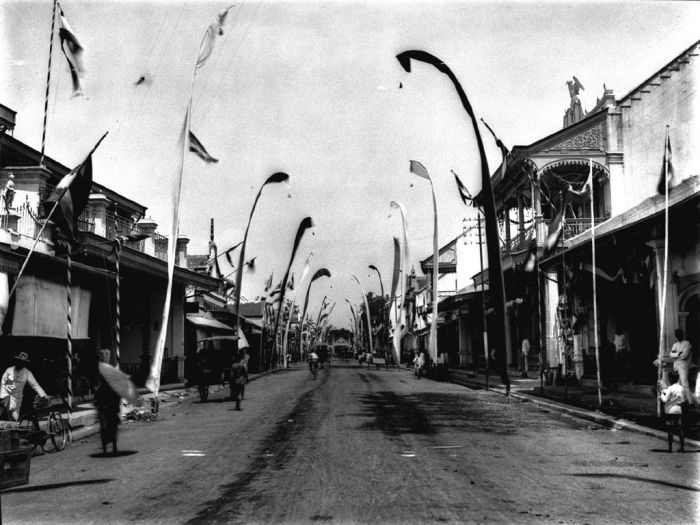
The atmosphere of Pekalongan Chinatown.

He was born in about 1819 in the port city of Tegal, Central Java. He was the son of Kapitein Lim Ke Tjang (1781–1826) and a grandson of Kapitein Lim Soen Boen (1756–1813) of Tegal, and came from a family belonging to the 'Cabang Atas' aristocracy. His grandfather and father were Kapiteins der Chinezen of Tegal from 1770 until 1813, and from 1813 until 1826, in which capacity they governed and administered the local Chinese community on behalf of the Dutch colonial authorities. His older brother, Lim Soe Tjong, succeeded their father as Kapitein of Tegal, and served from 1826 until 1832. As a descendant of Chinese officers, Lim was born with the hereditary title Sia.

== Career ==
According to historian Phoa Kian Sioe, Lim received a good education and was well-versed in the Chinese classics and in the Dutch language. Phoa also claims that Lim's family fell into genteel poverty due to financial mismanagement, which forced him to move from Tegal to Batavia to seek new opportunities.

Thanks to his patrician family background and decent education, Lim was chosen by Tan Eng Goan, the 1st Majoor der Chinezen of Batavia as husband for one of the latter's daughters, Tan Bit Nio. The couple was married in 1836 with the Majoor acting as a witness for the bride, and Kapitein Lim Soe Tjong for the groom. In Phoa's account, Majoor Tan Eng Goan subsequently arranged for his new son-in-law to be appointed administrator of the influential 'Ngo Ho Tjiang' Kongsi. In this role, Lim managed and administered the opium pacht, or revenue farm, on behalf of the consortium partners.

At some point, Lim encountered another recent arrival in Batavia, Oey Tamba Sia, the son and heir of the immensely wealthy tobacco tycoon from Pekalongan, Luitenant Oey Thai Lo. Lim and Oey started out as friends. Later, Lim was thought to be harassing one of Oey's female relatives. The two Peranakan figures fell out and became bitter enemies.

Their feud peaked when Oey Tamba Sia poisoned his own employee, Oey Tjeng Kie, in an attempt to frame Lim Soe Keng Sia for murder and thus destroy his good name. However, Oey Tamba Sia himself was tried and found guilty. Oey and his accomplices were sentenced to hang in the field of the City Hall of Batavia. Lim was freed and his reputation restored.

The story of Oey Tamba Sia and Lim Soe Keng Sia forms the basis of several Chinese-Malay literary works, and inspired Betawi folklore.

Lim Soe Keng Sia died in Batavia on May 21, 1883 at the age of 63.
