= Particuliere landerijen =

Landed domains in Java

The particuliere landerijen or particuliere landen (Dutch for 'private domains'; singular particuliere landerij or particuliere land), also called tanah partikelir in Indonesian, were landed domains in a feudal system of land tenure used in parts of the Java. Dutch jurists described these domains as ‘sovereign’ and of comparable legal status to indirectly ruled Vorstenlanden [princely states] in the Indies subject to the Dutch Crown. The lord of such a domain was called a Landheer [Dutch for 'landlord'], and by law possessed landsheerlijke rechten or hak-hak ketuanan [seigniorial jurisdiction] over the inhabitants of his domain — jurisdiction exercised elsewhere by the central government.

== History ==
The Dutch East India Company, which claimed to have succeeded to the rights of the ancient kings of Java, created and sold the earliest particuliere landen for the company's high-ranking officials, compradors and allies between the 1620s and its bankruptcy in 1799. Herman Willem Daendels, Governor-General of the Dutch East Indies during the Napoleonic interregnum from 1808 to 1811, and his British successor from 1811 until 1816, Sir Stamford Raffles, oversaw a large-scale sale of government land as particuliere landen. The creation of these domains ceased in 1829. The bulk of these particuliere landerijen were located around the colonial capital of Batavia (today known as Jakarta), in the Ommelanden of the old Residency of Batavia [Indonesian: Karesidenan Betawi], in West Java, and to a lesser extent in other parts of Java and the 'outer islands'. Like the princely states, the particuliere landerijen were not directly controlled by the colonial government, and so were not subjected to the notorious Cultivation System, introduced by Governor-General Johannes van den Bosch in 1830.

By 1901, there existed 304 particuliere landerijen, of which 101 were European-owned, with the rest being primarily under Chinese ownership, almost exclusively by the 'Cabang Atas' gentry. Around 800,000 peasants lived on these domains, and were subject to the rule of the Landheeren instead of the colonial government. The particuliere landerijen were known for supposed abuses of power by the Landheeren. A series of government ordinances were issued by the Dutch colonial government to better regulate the running of these private domains: Staatsblad 1836 No. 19 and Staatsblad 1912, No. 422.

In keeping with the ‘Ethical’ policy of the early twentieth century, the Dutch colonial government devised an ambitious plan to repurchase the particuliere landen from their owners. The motivation was to place the inhabitants of the domains on the same legal footing as other subjects of the Dutch colonial empire. The government's programme of land reacquisition began in 1912, but halted during the Great Depression (1929-1939). In 1935, the government founded NV Javasche Particuliere Landerijen Maatschappij ['Java Private Domains Company'], which was tasked with the acquisition of the particuliere landerijen on the open market.

Although land reforms continued, the particuliere landerijen – though much-reduced in numbers and in legal powers – survived the Japanese occupation during WW II (1942-1945) and the Indonesian revolution (1945-1949). In 1958, the Republic of Indonesia issued Undang-undang No. 1/1958, which formally abolished all remaining particuliere landerijen.

== Administration and structure ==
A particuliere landerij was divided into, firstly, tanah kongsi [seigniorial land] or the demesne of the Landheer, which was land retained by him for his own use; and secondly, tanah usaha, which consisted of dependent or enfeoffed holdings, held by the Landheer's tenant farmers. In addition, there was also forest land which could not be claimed or worked on without the permission of the Landheer. The residence of the Landheer was called a Landhuis or a rumah kongsi [seigniorial house]. In this context, 'Kongsi' meant 'Lord' or 'his Lordship', and was a title used by the Chinese Landheeren, who were invariably scions of the Cabang Atas gentry.

Government bureaucracy in the particuliere landen was nominated and remunerated not by the central government, but by the Landheeren themselves. An administrateur was appointed to oversee the management of the Landheer's tanah kongsi. As the highest authority in his domain, the Landheer appointed the district heads or Camat in his domain, other bureaucrats as he saw fit and, at the lowest level, village heads who – specifically in these particuliere landerijen – went by the title of Mandor. Minor crimes on the particuliere landen were adjudicated and punished by courts set up by the Landheer. The Landheer was also responsible for the provision of education, health and other social services and public infrastructures for the inhabitants of the domain.

As part of his landsheerlijke rechten, the Landheer was entitled to certain dues from his subjects, including tjoekee or contingent, which consisted of 20% of the harvest from dependent holdings worked on by his tenant farmers. The Landheer also collected padjeg, which was his predetermined share of his tenant farmers’ harvest, fixed for a certain period of time. The collection of all these dues was overseen by officials called Potia, who were assisted by deputies called Komitier.

Also part of his landsheerlijke rechten was the Landheer's right to impose kompenian or corvee labour on his subjects, amounting to sixty days of unpaid work each year from his tenant farmers at times determined by the Landheer or his bureaucrats. Kompenian labour included work on public infrastructures, such as roads or bridges on the domain, or work on the Landheer's own tanah kongsi. By Ommelanden custom, tenant farmers were only allowed to harvest their crops after receiving the Landheer's permission.

== List of particuliere landerijen ==
- Jatinegara
- Tanjung Timur
- Tanjung Barat
- Kramat

== See also ==
- Landrentestelsel
- Manorialism
- Serfdom
- Heerlijkheid (Dutch manorialism)
- Patroon (17th century New Netherland)
