= Tourism in Jepara =

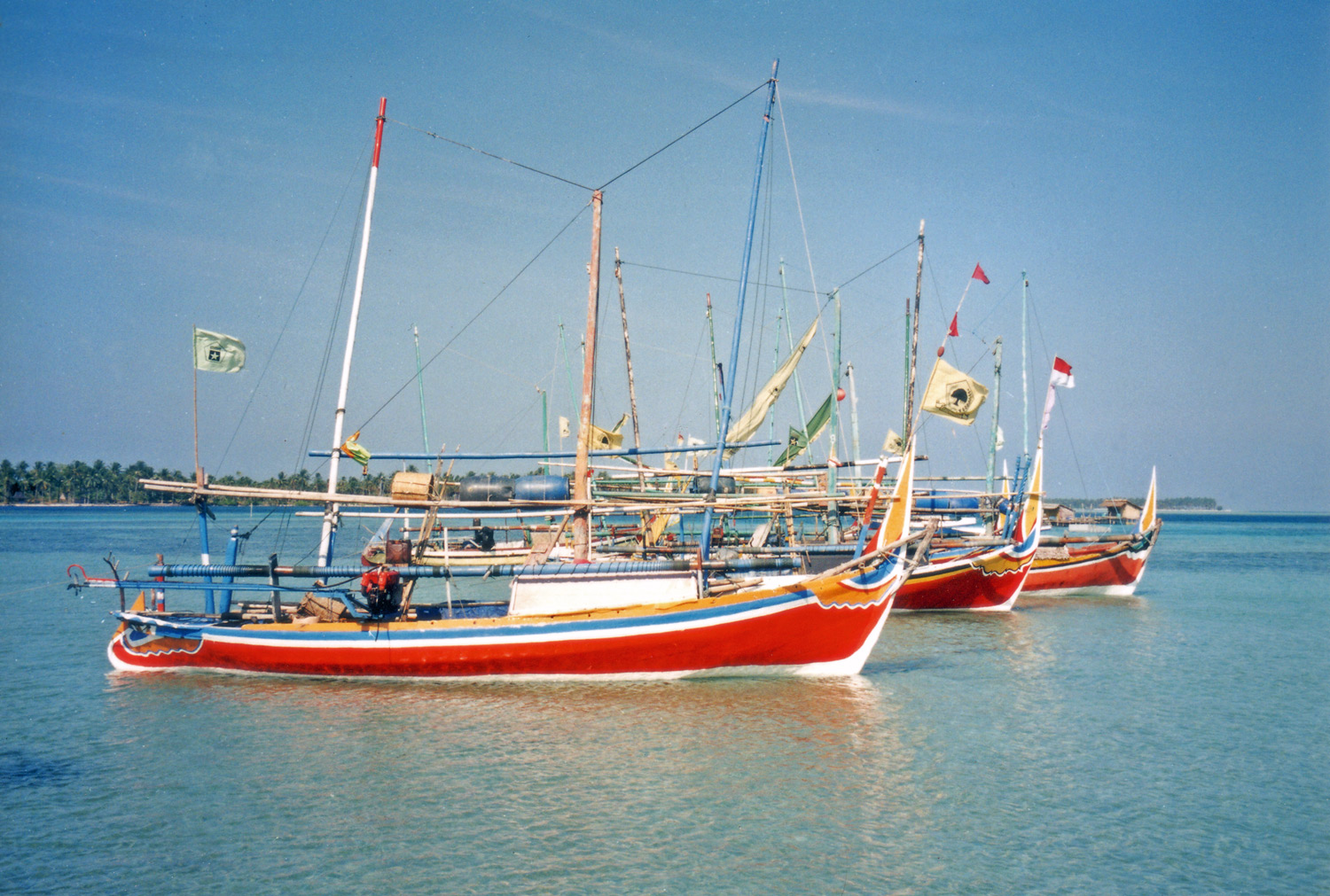
Karimun Java Fishing boats in the main harbour Jepara

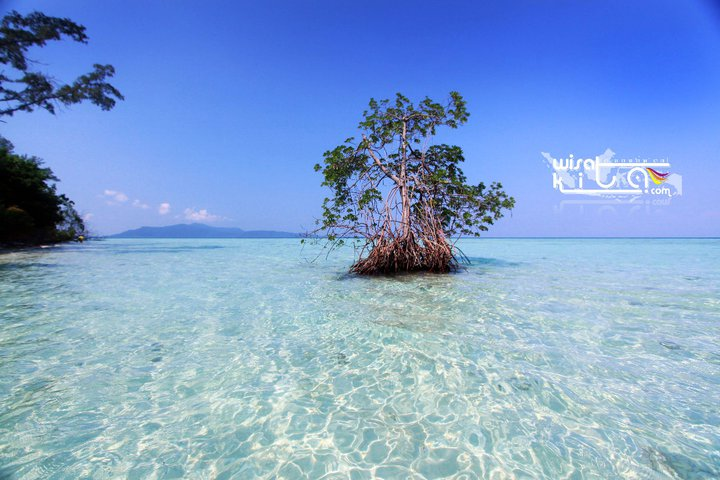
Karimunjava Sea

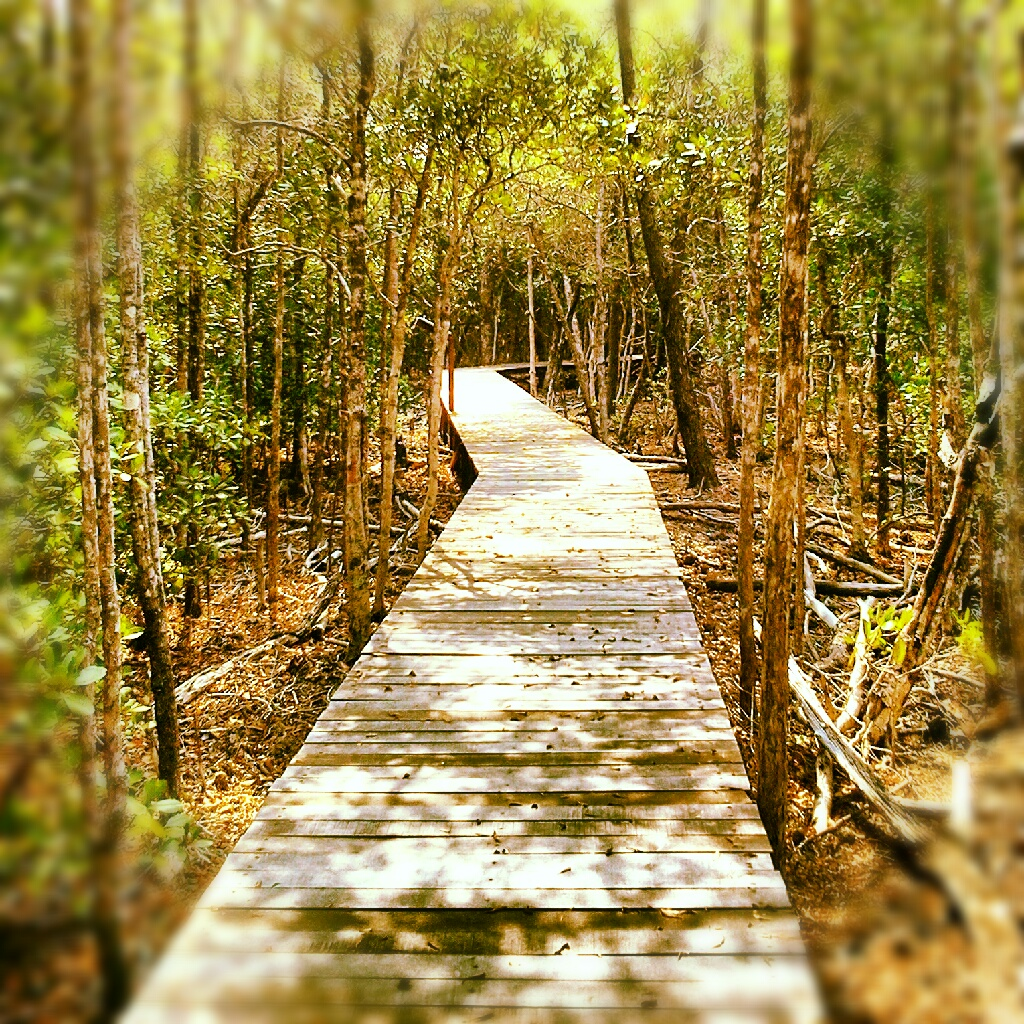
Karimunjava Mangrove park

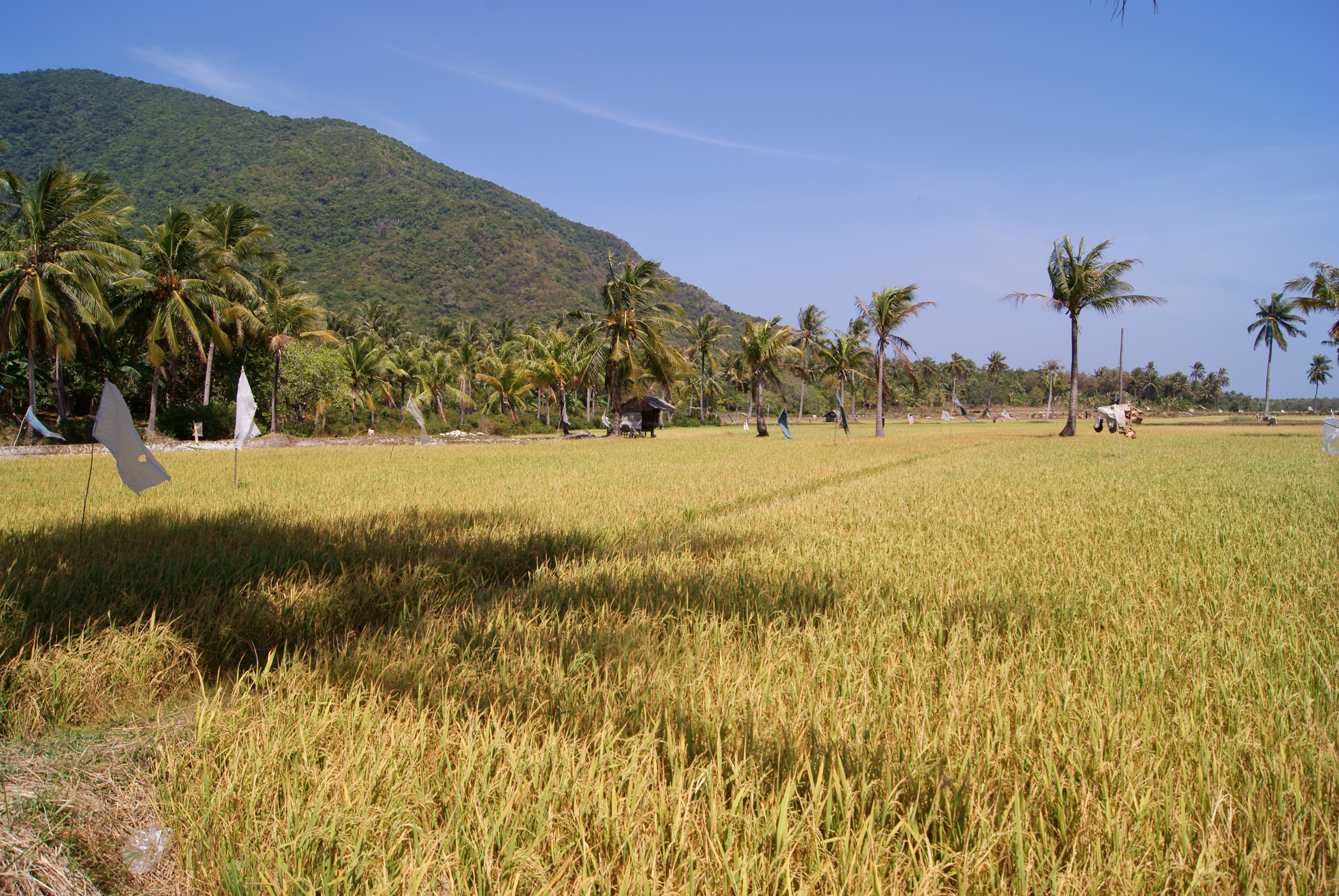
View of rice fields in Karimunjava

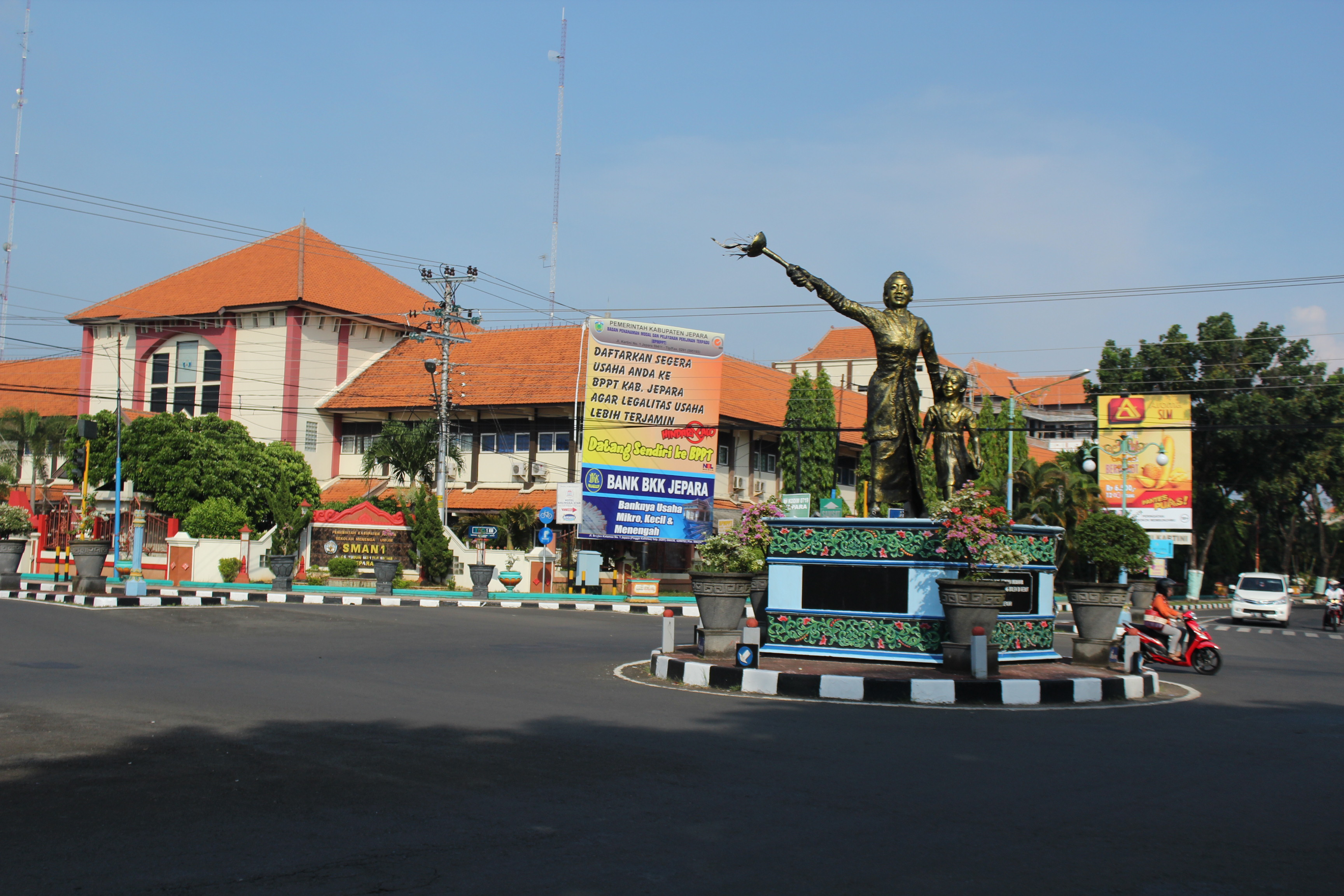
Kartini Monument in Jepara

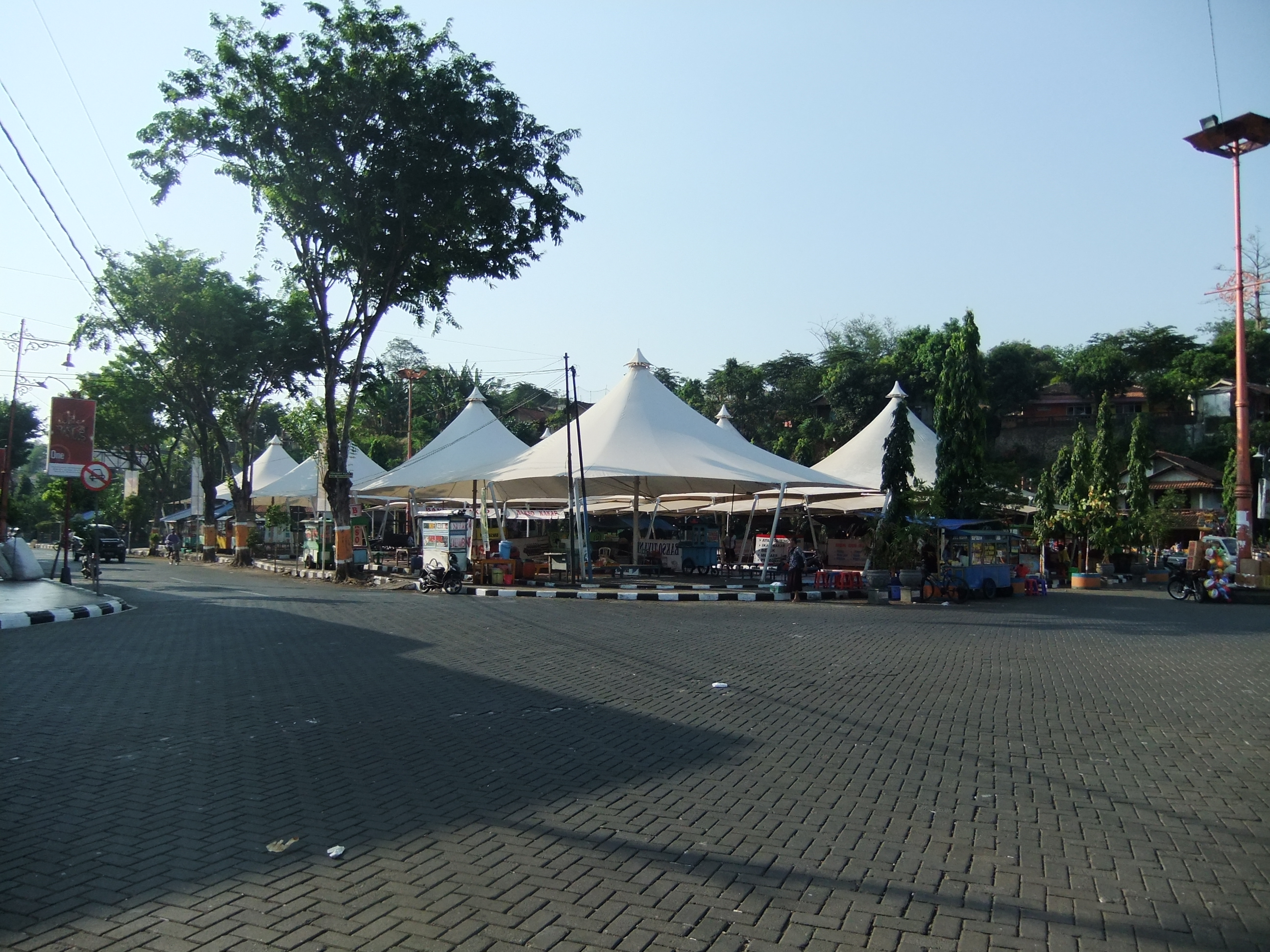
Jepara Culinary Centre

Tourism in Jepara is an important component of the economy of Jepara and a significant source of tax revenue. 8472 Tourism in Jepara attract foreign visitors in 2010. Jepara is a town which known for their culinary, education, tourism, and rich cultural heritage. There are many possibilities and opportunities lies for the city to prosper and benefits more, but yet until now the government has not yet fully utilized them. Jepara although only a small town but has many tourist attractions, the mountain tourism, beach tourism, underwater tours, tour the islands. Foreign tourists often visit Tirto Samodra Beach (Bandengan Beach), Karimunjava Island (Crimon Java), Kartini Beach, etc.

== Branding ==
In late September 2008 Jepara Regent Hendro Martojo announced the "Visit Jepara" brand used by cities’ and countries’ official tourism promotion campaign. Visit Jepara has a themed logo Jepara wood carving. Visit Jepara reflects the brand invites people to enjoy the city's natural beauty, unique culture, varied food, friendly people and price competitiveness.

== Major tourist destinations ==
Jepara with over 100 tourist attractions to explore, it is:

=== Karimunjava District ===
- Barakuda Beach
- Nirwana Beach
- Ujung Gelam Beach
- Batu Topeng Beach
- Yamin Beach
- Annora Beach
- Kemloko Beach
- Batu Karang Pengantin Beach
- Shark Conservation
- Turtle Conservation
- Tracking Mangrove Forest
- Legon Lele
- Mamaing Mount
- Gede Mount
- Hill Love
- Hallway Love (Lorong Cinta)
- Jokotuo Hill
- Nyamplungan Hill
- Nyamplungan Waterfall
- Menyawakan Island

=== Donorojo District ===
- Sima Temple
- Blingoh Lake
- Undak Manuk Waterfall
- Grenjengan Waterfall
- Jurang Ngantin Waterfall (Jurang Manten Waterfall)
- Tratak Cave
- Tritip Cave
- Pecatu Gua Manik Beach
- Mandalika Island
- Fort Portuguese

=== Keling District ===
- Angin Temple
- Bubrah Temple
- Beringin Beach
- Blorong Cave
- Watu Ombo Stone
- Kedung Pancur Telu Waterfall
- Curug Kemiri Waterfall
- Curug Kyai Buku Waterfall

=== Kembang District ===
- Bayuran Beach
- Suweru Beach
- Lemah Abang Beach
- Dudakawu Stone Town (Kota Watu)
- Sumanding Pinus Indah
- Songgo Langit Waterfall
- Jenggureng Waterfall
- Nglamer Waterfall
- Nglumprit Waterfall
- Grinjingan Dowo Waterfall
- Sendang Sinatah
- Manik Cave
- Sentral Park

=== Bangsri District ===
- Ombak Mati Beach
- Sejuta Akar Lake
- Nggembong Waterfall
- Kedung Ombo Waterfall
- Klebut Lake
- Watu Mbrayot

=== Mlonggo District ===
- Pailus Beach
- Blebak Beach
- Suweru Beach
- Ujung Piring Beach
- Empu Rancak Beach
- Jepara Ocean Park

=== Pakis Aji District ===
- Sakti Cave
- Akar Seribu
- Kedung Plumpang
- Jurang Nganten Waterfall
- Kalen Wates Waterfall
- Plajan Village Tour
- World Peace Gong Museum

=== Jepara District ===
- Kartini Museum
- Carving Museum
- Panjang Island
- Kartini Beach
- Tirto Samodra Beach (Bandengan Beach)
- Pendapa Jepara
- Fort VOC Jepara
- Baitul Makmur Great Mosque

=== Tahunan District ===
- Semat Beach
- Teluk Awur Beach
- Tegalsambi Beach
- Mloso Indah Waterfall
- Ngipik Indah Waterfall
- Mantingan Mosque

=== Batealit siggahan bringin District ===
- Wono Pinus Setro
- Banyu Anjlok Waterfall
- Sumenep Waterfall
- Cabe Waterfall
- Statah Waterfall
- Pancuran Waterfall
- Seberuk Waterfall
- Nongko Pace Waterfall
- Grojokan Wergol Waterfall

=== Pecangaan District ===
- Punden Lake
- Bongpes
- Karangrandu Traditional Food Market

=== Kedung District ===
- Kedungmalang

=== Kalinyamatan District ===
- Batukali Village Tour
- Gate of Robayan Mosque
- Palace of Kalinyamat Kingdom (Siti Inggil Kriyan)
- Tiara Park

=== Mayong District ===
- Suroloyo Waterfall

=== Welahan District ===
- Karanganyar Traditional Toys Village
- Hian Thian Siang Tee Temple

=== Nalumsari District ===
- Sreni Indah
- Kemiren Waterfall
- Belik Bidadari and Jaka Tarub Lake

== Event ==
Jepara held several events every year, it is:

- Festival Kartini

is event celebrate the Anniversary Jepara memorial and commemoration of Kartini Day . Festival Kartini is a tradition in the show on the month of April. If we want to go there, we can use private car.

- Pesta Lomban

is sea alms ceremony in the form of offerings buffalo head that floated in the sea Jepara, So that swept away the buffalo head eaten by fish. Pesta Lomban is as an expression of gratitude to God. Therefore, with the Lomban giving alms or feed the fish, it can foster a sense of caring for the environment and that fishermen are not greedy with the dredge as much natural wealth, especially the sea. Pesta Lomban is a tradition in the show on the 7th month of Shawwal. If we want to go there, we can use private car.

- Pesta Baratan

is carnival traditions Impes (traditional lanterns Kalinyamat) in the show on the 15th of Sha'ban. The word "baratan" comes from an Arabic word, which is "baraah" which means salvation or "barakah" meaning blessing. Tradition Pesta Baratan arranged by theme cavalcade Queen Kalinyamat and his troops holding Impes and Torch. If we want to go there, we can use private car.

- Festival Oncor

is a tradition convoy in the show on the evening of the 10th month of Dhu al-Hijjah. Festival brings Oncor Oncor participants with a variety of themes and designs, participants carried Oncor There also were carrying traditional Oncor unique design. If we want to go there, we can use private car.

- Perang Obor

is a battle using coconut fronds that have been dried and the inside is filled with dried banana leaves. Torches are lit together have available to use as a tool to attack each other so that frequent collisions that could result in the glowing torch-flames were huge, which gave rise to the name of the torch War. If we want to go there, we can use private car.

- Memeden Gadhu Festival

is a tradition convoy scarecrow. Memeden Gadhu Festival held in the Kepuk village. Participants wore peasant costumes and traditional Javanese clothes, bring tumpeng and scarecrows various forms. If we want to go there, we can use private car.

- Festival Jondang

is the parade bring jondang containing food and agricultural products is a tradition bachelor application to a virgin girl to get to the wedding. Before the parade began, people first offered by traditional crafts. only then one by one the participants paraded the creations jondang to punden Mbah Kawak. If we want to go there, we can use private car.

- Jembul Tulakan

is jembul parade in the village Tulakan. Jembul is in the form of parts of bamboo are parsed as thin as a hair. Parts of bamboo gathered with other grain as an offering. Jembul Tulakan ceremony is an expression of gratitude to God. If we want to go there, we can use private car.

- Jembul Bedekah

is jembul parade in the village Banyumanis. Jembul is in the form of parts of bamboo are parsed as thin as a hair. Parts of bamboo gathered with other grain as an offering. Jembul Bedekah ceremony is an expression of gratitude to God. If we want to go there, we can use private car.

- Barikan

is a form of expression of gratitude and sharing with fellow creatures of God's creation in the sea Karimunjava. To that end, the cone does not only produce, but also from the sea. If we want to go there, we can use private car. <

- Jepara Thongtek Carnival

is parade in which participants no use kentongan, gong, bedug, gendang, gamelan, angklung, trumpet. Parade participants shouting yells "sahur... sahur...," Parade participants also uses an interesting costume. Jepara Thongtek Carnival is a tradition convoy in the show on the evening of the month of Ramadhan. If we want to go there, we can use private car.

- Jepara Bedug Festival is a parade in which participants use Bedug while Takbir peal. Jepara Bedug Festival is a traditional convoy in the show on the evening of the 1st month of Shawwal. If we want to go there, we can use private car.

== Art culture ==
Jepara have traditional cultural arts are very interesting, it is:

- Barongan Dencong
- Wayang Golek Langkung
- Kridhajati Dance
- Impes Dance
- Tenun Troso Dance
- Emprak Dance
- Tayub Dance
- Samroh
- Gambus
- Angguk
- Dagelan
- Kentrung
- Ludruk
- Ketropak
- Keroncong
- Prasah

Samroh, Gambus, and Angguk, types of traditional art all themed Islam. Other types of traditional arts is Dagelan, Emprak, Ketropak, Ludruk, Kentrung, Keroncong, dan Prasah. Through some of these traditional arts, the government used to convey messages to the public for instance on the development and healthy families.
