= Kartini (disambiguation) =

Kartini may refer to:

- Kartini (1879–1904), Indonesian activist
- Kartini (film), Indonesian film
- Kartini Hermanus (1949–2021), Indonesian general
- Kartini Muljadi (1930–2025), Indonesian pharmaceutical industry executive
- Kartini, an Indonesian women's magazine
- Kartini Beach, beach in Java, Indonesia
