= List of shipwrecks in July 1850 =

The list of shipwrecks in July 1850 includes ships sunk, foundered, wrecked, grounded, or otherwise lost during July 1850.

== 1 July ==
List of shipwrecks: 1 July 1850
Ship	State	Description
Cornucopia	Netherlands	The ship was driven ashore on Eierland, North Holland. Her crew were rescued. She was on a voyage from Sunderland, County Durham, United Kingdom to Amsterdam, North Holland.

== 2 July ==
List of shipwrecks: 2 July 1850
Ship	State	Description
John	United Kingdom	The ship ran aground at Chester, Cheshire.
Mary	United Kingdom	The brig ran aground at Chester.
Norma	United Kingdom	The ship was wrecked at Axim, Africa. Her crew were rescued.
Varechwell	United Kingdom	The ship ran aground at Chester.

== 3 July ==
List of shipwrecks: 3 July 1850
Ship	State	Description
Edouard Corbière	France	The ship was abandoned in the North Sea. Her crew were rescued.
Gesina	Duchy of Holstein	The ship ran aground off Düne, Heligoland. She was on a voyage from Newcastle upon Tyne, Northumberland, United Kingdom to Flensburg. She was refloated and resumed her voyage.
James Dale	United Kingdom	The schooner was driven ashore at Cultra, County Down. She was refloated the next day and taken in to Belfast, County Antrim.
Powerful	United Kingdom	The ketch was wrecked at Abbotsbury, Dorset. Her crew were rescued. She was on a voyage from Par, Cornwall to Bridport, Dorset.
Progress	United Kingdom	The sloop capsized in a squall off Whitby, Yorkshire with the loss of two of her three crew. She was on a voyage from Lowestoft, Suffolk to Newcastle upon Tyne, Northumberland.

== 4 July ==
List of shipwrecks: 4 July 1850
Ship	State	Description
Minerva	United Kingdom	The ship was wrecked at Port Natal, Cape Colony.
Russia	United Kingdom	The ship ran aground at the entrance to the Douglas Channel.

== 5 July ==
List of shipwrecks: 5 July 1850
Ship	State	Description
Capital	United Kingdom	The ship ran aground off Helsingør, Denmark. She was on a voyage from Sunderland, County Durham to Kronstadt, Russia. She was refloated and resumed her voyage.
Gentoo	United Kingdom	The ship was driven ashore at Griffon Cove, Province of Canada, British North America. Her crew were rescued. She was on a voyage from London to Quebec City, Province of Canada. She was refloated on 20 July and taken in to Gaspé for temporary repairs.
Thomas	United Kingdom	The ship was driven ashore at Hairey Point, Devon.
Wave	United Kingdom	The ship was driven ashore at Cape Rosier, Maine, United States. All on board were rescued. She was on a voyage from Limerick to Quebec City. She had become a wreck by 29 July.

== 6 July ==
List of shipwrecks: 6 July 1850
Ship	State	Description
Adonis	United States	The ship was wrecked on Table Island. She was on a voyage from Baltimore, Maryland to Bic Island, Province of Canada, British North America.
Prince Charlie	United Kingdom	The ship was driven ashore at the Cape of Good Hope, Cape Colony. She was refloated.
Psyche	United Kingdom	The ship was wrecked near St. Peter's, Nova Scotia, British North America. She was on a voyage from Miramichi, New Brunswick to Saint John's, Newfoundland.
Tweed	United Kingdom	The smack sprang a leak and was abandoned. She was on a voyage from Ayr to Campbeltown, Argyllshire.

== 7 July ==
List of shipwrecks: 7 July 1850
Ship	State	Description
Defiance	United Kingdom	The schooner sprang a leak and foundered in the English Channel off Beachy Head, Sussex. Her crew were rescued. She was on a voyage from Liverpool, Lancashire to Dordrecht, South Holland, Netherlands.
Elizabeth	United Kingdom	The ship sank off Courtown, County Wexford. She was on a voyage from Glasgow, Renfrewshire to Waterford.
James and William	United Kingdom	The ship was driven ashore and wrecked at Grand-Métis, Province of Canada, British North America. Her crew were rescued.

== 9 July ==
List of shipwrecks: 9 July 1850
Ship	State	Description
Nereid	United Kingdom	The East Indiaman sprang a leak and was abandoned in the Indian Ocean. Her crew were rescued by Emperor (United Kingdom). She was on a voyage from Calcutta, India.

== 10 July ==
List of shipwrecks: 10 July 1850
Ship	State	Description
Carteretta	(United Kingdom of Great Britain and Ireland) British North America	The ship was wrecked in Conset's Bay, Barbados. Her crew were rescued. She was on a voyage from Newfoundland to Barbados.
Economist	United Kingdom	The barque capsized in a squall in the Atlantic Ocean with the loss of eleven of her thirteen crew. She was on a voyage from Liverpool, Lancashire to Barbados.
Ellen	United Kingdom	The ship ran aground on the Hat Key Reef. She was on a voyage from Glasgow, Renfrewshire to Belize City, British Honduras. She was refloated.
Fort Augustus	United Kingdom	The ship sank off Cowes, Isle of Wight.
Patience	United Kingdom	The ship was driven ashore at Portsmouth, Hampshire. She was on a voyage from Livorno, Grand Duchy of Tuscany to Portsmouth. She was refloated and taken in to Portsmouth.
Promise	(United Kingdom of Great Britain and Ireland) Saint Vincent	The schooner was wrecked at Wilkie's Point. Her crew were rescued.
St. Jean	France	The chasse-marée was wrecked on the Goodwin Sands, Kent, United Kingdom. Her crew were rescued. She was on a voyage from Sunderland, County Durham to Nantes, Loire-Inférieure.

== 11 July ==
List of shipwrecks: 11 July 1850
Ship	State	Description
John	United Kingdom	The ship ran aground on the Island Reef, off Plymouth, Devon. She was on a voyage from Newport, Isle of Wight to Plymouth. She was refloated.
Lady Georgiana	(United Kingdom of Great Britain and Ireland) Barbuda	The sloop was driven ashore on Barbuda.
New Zealand	United Kingdom	The ship was destroyed by fire in the Atlantic Ocean. Her crew were rescued by Panurge (United Kingdom). She was on a voyage from Bombay, India to London.
Osbert	United Kingdom	The barque capsized and was wrecked in Rosean Bay, Dominica.
Promise	(United Kingdom of Great Britain and Ireland) Saint Vincent	The schooner was wrecked on Wilkie's Point during a hurricane. Her crew were rescued.
Speculante	Prussia	The ship was driven ashore and wrecked near Swinemünde. She was on a voyage from Swinemünde to Copenhagen, Denmark.
Victoria	(United Kingdom of Great Britain and Ireland) Barbuda	The sloop sank at Barbuda with the loss of her captain.
Wilhelmina	Elbing	The ship was driven ashore at Brancaster, Norfolk, United Kingdom.

== 12 July ==
List of shipwrecks: 12 July 1850
Ship	State	Description
Alarm	United Kingdom	The yacht sank at Plymouth, Devon.
Benjamin Greene	United Kingdom	The ship was driven ashore on Saint Kitts in a hurricane and was abandoned by her crew. She was consequently condemned.
Brothers	(United Kingdom of Great Britain and Ireland) Dominica	The sloop was driven ashore on Dominica during a hurricane.
Calypso	(United Kingdom of Great Britain and Ireland) Dominica	The sloop was driven ashore on Dominica during a hurricane.
Catherine	United Kingdom	The ship was driven ashore and wrecked near Rønne, Denmark. She was on a voyage from Liverpool, Lancashire to Riga, Russia.
Childe Harold	(United Kingdom of Great Britain and Ireland) Dominica	The sloop was driven ashore on Dominica during a hurricane.
Ellen	United Kingdom	The ship ran aground off Mandalika Island, Netherlands East Indies. She was on a voyage from Surabaya to Batavia. She was refloated on 28 July.
Enchantress	United Kingdom	The brig was driven ashore on Saint Martin in a hurricane.
Governor Mackintosh	(United Kingdom of Great Britain and Ireland) Saint Kitts	The sloop was driven ashore on Saint Kitts in a hurricane.
Helena	(United Kingdom of Great Britain and Ireland) Tortola	The sloop was driven ashore on Saint Kitts in a hurricane.
Jane and Mary	(United Kingdom of Great Britain and Ireland) Dominica	The sloop was driven ashore on Dominica during a hurricane.
Mariquita	United Kingdom	The ship was driven ashore at Portsmouth, Hampshire. She was on a voyage from Portsmouth to Neath, Glamorgan. She was refloated on 13 July and resumed her voyage.
Mary Ellen	United Kingdom	The ship capsized in a squall off Greytown, Nicaragua. Her crew were rescued.
Osbourne	(United Kingdom of Great Britain and Ireland) Dominica	The schooner was wrecked off Dominica during a hurricane. Her crew were rescued.
Parmahite	(United Kingdom of Great Britain and Ireland) Saint Kitts	The sloop was driven ashore on Saint Kitts in a hurricane.
Phocion	United States	The ship was wrecked in Long Bay, Barbados.
Robert Henderson	United Kingdom	The ship was driven ashore and wrecked near San Francisco, Alta California. She was on a voyage from San Francisco to Sydney, New South Wales.
Sarah Maria	(France) Saint Martin	The sloop was lost at Saint Martin during a hurricane.
Union	(United Kingdom of Great Britain and Ireland) Saint Kitts	The cutter sank at Sandy Point in a hurricane.
Venus	(United Kingdom of Great Britain and Ireland) Dominica	The sloop was driven ashore on Dominica during a hurricane.
Victoria	United Kingdom	The ship was driven ashore and wrecked on Saint Martin in a hurricane.
William Stewart	(United Kingdom of Great Britain and Ireland) Dominica	The sloop was driven ashore on Dominica during a hurricane.

== 13 July ==
List of shipwrecks: 13 July 1850
Ship	State	Description
Anne	United Kingdom	The ship ran aground on the Longships. She was on a voyage from Bangor to Goole, Yorkshire. She was refloated, temporarily repaired and resumed her voyage.
Ann Melhuish	United Kingdom	The ship ran aground in the Hooghly River. She was on a voyage from Liverpool, Lancashire to Calcutta, India. She was refloated and taken in to Calcutta.
Courier	United Kingdom	The ship was driven ashore at Point Helen, Spain. Her crew were rescued. She was on a voyage from Cardiff, Glamorgan to Galaţi. Ottoman Empire. She was condemned.
John Sparks	United Kingdom	The ship ran aground in the Hooghly River. She was on a voyage from Liverpool to Calcutta. She was refloated and taken in to Calcutta.
Phocion	United States	The brig was wrecked off Barbados.
Reginald Heber	United Kingdom	The ship ran aground in the Hooghly River. She was on a voyage from Liverpool to Calcutta. She was refloated and taken in to Calcutta.
Zion's Hope	United Kingdom	The ship ran aground in the Hooghly River. She was on a voyage from Liverpool to Calcutta. She was refloated and taken in to Calcutta.

== 14 July ==
List of shipwrecks: 14 July 1850
Ship	State	Description
Lady Ann	United Kingdom	The schooner was driven ashore at Scotstown Head, Aberdeenshire. She was on a voyage from Inverness to the Moray Firth. She was refloated and resumed her voyage.
Myrtle	United Kingdom	The ship was driven ashore at Smith's Point, Nantucket, Massachusetts, United States. She was on a voyage from New York, United States to Halifax, Nova Scotia, British North America.
Piscator	Denmark	The ship was wrecked on Anholt. She was on a voyage from Stubbekøbing to an English port.

== 15 July ==
List of shipwrecks: 15 July 1850
Ship	State	Description
Agnes	Stettin	The ship sprang a leak whilst on a voyage from Sunderland, County Durham, United Kingdom to Stettin. She put in to "Egvaag" in a sinking condition.
Caroline	United Kingdom	The brig was wrecked on the Horseshoe Reef, off the coast of Jamaica. Her crew were rescued. She was on a voyage from Kingston to Alligator Pond, Jamaica.
Ostsee Packet	Russia	The schooner ran aground in the Elbe. She was on a voyage from Hamburg to Memel, Prussia. She was refloated and taken in to Cuxhaven for repairs.
Two Friends	United Kingdom	The ship ran aground on the Holm Sand, in the North Sea off the coast of Suffolk. She was refloated.

== 16 July ==
List of shipwrecks: 16 July 1850
Ship	State	Description
Emma	United Kingdom	The ship was driven ashore on Fehmarn, Duchy of Holstein. She was on a voyage from Elbing to King's Lynn, Norfolk. She was refloated.
Gift	United Kingdom	The ship was lost off Newfoundland, British North America. She was on a voyage from Montreal, Province of Canada, British North America to Liverpool, Lancashire.
Maria Elizabeth	Hamburg	The ship was driven ashore and damaged at Cuxhaven. She was on a voyage from Hamburg to Veracruz, Mexico. She was refloated and put back to Hamburg.
Rose	United Kingdom	The ship was wrecked on Green Island, Tusket Islands, Nova Scotia, British North America. She was on a voyage from Prince Edward Island, British North America to Liverpool, Lancashire.

== 17 July ==
List of shipwrecks: 17 July 1850
Ship	State	Description
Ceres	Kingdom of the Two Sicilies	The barque driven ashore south of Bridlington, Yorkshire, United Kingdom. She was refloated.

== 18 July ==
List of shipwrecks: 18 July 1850
Ship	State	Description
Archon	Russia	The ship ran aground and sank off "Hollo". She was on a voyage from Vyborg to Grimsby, Lincolnshire. United Kingdom.
Berlin	United Kingdom	The brig was driven ashore at New York City, United States. She was refloated on 3 August.
Constellation	United States	The ship was driven ashore at New York City. She was refloated.
Elizabeth	United States	The ship was wrecked on Fire Island, New York with the loss of eight of the 23 people on board. She was on a voyage from Livorno, Grand Duchy of Tuscany to New York City
Ellen	United Kingdom	The full-rigged ship was driven ashore at New York City. She was on a voyage from New York City to Bristol, Gloucestershire. She was refloated on 3 August.
Guy Mannering	United States	The ship was driven ashore at New York City.
Scotia	(United Kingdom of Great Britain and Ireland) British North America	The schooner ran aground at Freshwater Point, Newfoundland and was abandoned by her crew. She was on a voyage from Bathurst, New Brunswick to Saint John's, Newfoundland. She was towed in to Trepassey Bay the next day.

== 19 July ==
List of shipwrecks: 19 July 1850
Ship	State	Description
Blucher	United Kingdom	The ship ran aground off Scots Head, Dominica. She was on a voyage from Patagonia, Argentina to New York. She was refloated the next day but consequently foundered 12 nautical miles (22 km) west of Guadeloupe. Her crew were rescued.
Ellen	United Kingdom	The ship ran aground on the Hat Key Reef. She was on a voyage from Glasgow, Renfrewshire to Belize City, British Honduras. She was refloated.
Pilot	United Kingdom	The paddle steamer struck a rock and sank in Loch Lomond off Rowardennan, Stirlingshire. All on board were rescued.
Racer	United States	The ship capsized in the Atlantic Ocean. She was driven ashore and wrecked at Cape Hatteras, North Carolina with the loss of three of her crew. She was on a voyage from New York to Nassau, Bahamas.

== 20 July ==
List of shipwrecks: 20 July 1850
Ship	State	Description
Eclaireur	France	The ship was wrecked at Casablanca, Morocco.
Houghton Le Skerne	United Kingdom	The ship was wrecked at Red Islands, Nova Scotia, British North America. She was on a voyage from Port Talbot, Glamorgan to Quebec City, Province of Canada, British North America.
Sutcliffe	United Kingdom	The ship was driven ashore and wrecked on Cape Sable Island, Nova Scotia, British North America. She was on a voyage from Liverpool, Lancashire to Saint John, New Brunswick, British North America.
Sylvanus	(United Kingdom of Great Britain and Ireland) New South Wales	The schooner was wrecked at Port Albert.

== 21 July ==
List of shipwrecks: 21 July 1850
Ship	State	Description
Sylph	France	The ship ran aground and was damaged at Guadeloupe. She was on a voyage from Martinique to Guadeloupe. She was refloated and taken in to Guadeloupe in a leaky condition.
Triton	Hamburg	The ship was wrecked on Key Gloria, off the coast of British Honduras. Her crew survived. She was on a voyage from Hamburg to Belize City, British Honduras.
Von der Tann	Reichsflotte	Von der Tann. First Schleswig War: The gunboat ran aground at Neustadt in Holstein, Duchy of Holstein whilst in an engagement with HDMS Heckla and HDMS Valkyrie (both Royal Danish Navy). She was set afire by her crew and abandoned. Von der Tann was subsequently salvaged, repaired and returned to service.
Zillia	France	The barque was wrecked on the Palena Rock, off the coast of Uruguay. She was on a voyage from Buenos Aires, Argentina to Havre de Grâce, Seine-Inférieure.

== 22 July ==
List of shipwrecks: 22 July 1850
Ship	State	Description
Anisartitos	Greece	The polacca ran aground on a reef off Conil de la Frontera, Spain. She was refloated but was consequently beached at "Barroro". Her crew were rescued. She was on a voyage from Galaţi, Ottoman Empire to Cork or Falmouth, Cornwall, United Kingdom.
Castrignano	Austrian Empire	The brig was driven ashore east of Gibraltar. She was on a voyage from Odesa to Cork or Falmouth, Cornwall, United Kingdom. She was refloated on 24 July and taken in to Gibraltar.
Mercury	United Kingdom	The barque (corrected from Mercurius) was dismasted and run ashore at Montevideo, Uruguay in a heavy gale on the River Plate. She became a total loss.
Red Rover	United Kingdom	The steamboat suffered a boiler explosion and sank at Hotwells, Gloucestershire with the loss of at least ten lives.
Woodland	United Kingdom	The schooner was wrecked on the Lowther Rock, in the Orkney Islands. Her crew were rescued. She was on a voyage from Liverpool, Lancashire to Wick, Caithness. She was refloated the next day and taken in to Borwick Bay in a waterlogged condition.
Zelia	France	The ship was driven ashore at Santa Lucia, Uruguay. She was on a voyage from Buenos Aires, Argentina to Havre de Grâce, Seine-Inférieure. She had been refloated by 8 August and taken in to Montevideo, Uruguay. It was expected that she would be condemned.

== 23 July ==
List of shipwrecks: 23 July 1850
Ship	State	Description
Endeavour	United Kingdom	The trow foundered in the Bristol Channel. Her crew were rescued.
George	United Kingdom	The ship ran aground off Point Banby, Nova Scotia, British North America. She was on a voyage from Tatamagouche, Nova Scotia to Liverpool, Lancashire.
Rajah Bassa	India	The barque was wrecked on the Prata Shoals. Her crew were rescued. Her crew were rescued by the barque Cornhill (United Kingdom)
Sophia	United Kingdom	The ship ran aground on the Long Rock, off the coast of County Antrim. She was on a voyage from Renfrew to Rochester, Kent. She was refloated the next day and resumed her voyage.

== 25 July ==
List of shipwrecks: 25 July 1850
Ship	State	Description
HMS Plumper	Royal Navy	The sloop-of-war ran aground and was damaged off Digby, Nova Scotia, British North America. She was refloated and taken in to Digby for repairs.
Ringfield	United Kingdom	The ship was lost off the Cape of Good Hope, Cape Colony. Her crew were rescued by Strabane (United Kingdom). Ringfield was on a voyage from Bombay, India to Liverpool, Lancashire.
Rustornjee Cowajee	India	The ship departed from Singapore for a port in China. No further trace, presumed foundered with the loss of all hands.

== 26 July ==
List of shipwrecks: 26 July 1850
Ship	State	Description
Belle	(United Kingdom of Great Britain and Ireland) Isle of Man	The brig was driven ashore on the coast of Virginia, United States. She was on a voyage from Wilmington, North Carolina to Liverpool, Lancashire.
Elizabeth	United Kingdom	The sloop was driven ashore at Spurn Point, Yorkshire. She was refloated and resumed her voyage.
Emblem	United Kingdom	The ship ran aground on the Gunfleet Sand, in the North Sea off the coast of Essex. She was on a voyage from Seaham, County Durham to London. She was refloated and taken in to Harwich, Essex in a leaky condition.
Frolic	United States	The brig was wrecked on a reef about 60 nautical miles (110 km) North of Fort Ross, California. There was no loss of life but total loss of the ship and valuable cargo estimated at $150,000. She was on a voyage from China to San Francisco, Alta California.
Jane	United Kingdom	The sloop was driven ashore at Spurn Point. She was refloated the next day and resumed her voyage.
Jane	United Kingdom	The ship was driven ashore at the mouth of the Eider. She was refloated on 28 July and taken in to Tönning, Duchy of Holstein.
John Harrison	United Kingdom	The ship capsized off Swinemünde, Prussia. She was on a voyage from Swinemünde to London. She was declared a total loss.
Ocean	United Kingdom	The ship was driven ashore on the coast of Virginia. She was on a voyage from Wilmington to Liverpool.
Pilgrim	United Kingdom	The ship ran aground on the Whiting Sand, in the North Sea off the coast of Suffolk. She was on a voyage from Seaton Sluice, County Durham to London. She was refloated and taken in to Harwich in a leaky condition.

== 27 July ==
List of shipwrecks: 27 July 1850
Ship	State	Description
Accommodation, and Jane	United Kingdom	The sloop Jane ran aground in the River Welland alongside the sloop Accommodation and became foul of the latter as the tide fell, causing Accommodation to sink.
Adventure	United Kingdom	The ship sprang a leak and was beached. She was on a voyage from Caen, Calvados to London. She was later refloated.
Elizabeth	United Kingdom	The ship ran aground on the Barber Sand, in the North Sea off the coast of Norfolk.
Hope	United Kingdom	The ship ran aground and capsized in the River Parrett at Bridgwater, Somerset. She was righted.
New Messenger	United Kingdom	The ship ran aground on the Whitby Rock. She was on a voyage from Sunderland, County Durham to Amsterdam, North Holland, Netherlands. She was refloated and resumed her voyage, but consequently put in to Texel in a leaky condition.
Sportsman	United Kingdom	The schooner ran aground on The Shingles, off the Isle of Wight. She was on a voyage from Llanelly, Glamorgan to Southampton, Hampshire. She was refloated the next day and resumed her voyage.
Susannah	United Kingdom	The sloop ran aground and sank at Spalding, Lincolnshire.

== 28 July ==
List of shipwrecks: 28 July 1850
Ship	State	Description
Eveline	United Kingdom	The ship was driven ashore on "Ingirli Island", in the Gulf of Smyrna. She was on a voyage from Smyrna, Ottoman Empire to London. She was refloated on 6 August.
Palamedes	United Kingdom	The ship was wrecked on Peal's Skerry, off North Ronaldsay, Orkney Islands. Her crew were rescued. She was on a voyage from Liverpool, Lancashire to Narva, Russian Empire.

== 29 July ==
List of shipwrecks: 29 July 1850
Ship	State	Description
Harmony	United Kingdom	The ship was driven ashore and wrecked on the Mull of Galloway, Wigtownshire. Her crew were rescued. She was on a voyage from Belfast, County Antrim to Maryport, Cumberland.
Hercules	(United Kingdom of Great Britain and Ireland) British North America	The ship was wrecked on the Merr Ledges. Her crew were rescued. She was on a voyage from Boston, Massachusetts, United States to Wilmot, Nova Scotia.
Union	United Kingdom	The brig was in collision with the steamship Royal William (United Kingdom) and sank in the River Thames at Grays, Essex with the loss of a crew member.

== 30 July ==
List of shipwrecks: 31 July 1850
Ship	State	Description
Jane King	United Kingdom	The ship was wrecked 30 nautical miles (56 km) east of La Poile, Newfoundland, British North America. Her crew were rescued She was on a voyage from Matanzas, Cuba to Quebec City, Province of Canada, British North America.
Selina	United Kingdom	The ship was wrecked on Grand Manan Island, Nova Scotia, British North America. Her crew were rescued. She was on a voyage from Dublin to Saint John, New Brunswick, British North America.
Susan	(United Kingdom of Great Britain and Ireland) New South Wales	The ship was wrecked at the mouth of the Clarence River.
Ticonderoga	United Kingdom	The ship was driven ashore on Long Island, New York. She was on a voyage from Liverpool, Lancashire to New York City. She was refloated on 5 August and completed her voyage.

== 31 July ==
List of shipwrecks: 31 July 1850
Ship	State	Description
Alice Bentley	United Kingdom	The ship ran aground and sank off Saint John, New Brunswick, British North America. Her crew were rescued. She was on a voyage from Liverpool, Lancashire to Saint John.
Britannia	United Kingdom	The ship sprang a leak and foundered in the North Sea 4 nautical miles (7.4 km) north east of the Farne Islands, Northumberland. Her crew were rescued. She was on a voyage from South Shields, County Durham to Grangemouth, Stirlingshire.
Fame	United Kingdom	The ship was driven ashore in Ballycotton Bay. She was on a voyage from Cork to Youghal, County Cork. She had become a wreck by 10 August.
Helen	United Kingdom	The ship ran aground in the River Wyre. She was on a voyage from Dalhousie, New Brunswick, British North America to Fleetwood, Lancashire. She was refloated on 1 August.
Pearl	United Kingdom	The ship ran aground at Sunderland, County Durham. She was on a voyage from Moulmein, Burma to Sunderland. She was refloated and towed in to Sunderland.
Raymond	United Kingdom	The ship ran aground and was damaged at San Francisco, Alta California.
Triton	Hamburg	The barque was wrecked on Key Gloria or the Long Key Reef. Her crew were rescued. She was on a voyage from Hamburg to Belize City, British Honduras.

== Unknown date ==
List of shipwrecks: Unknown date in July 1850
Ship	State	Description
Aratus	United States	The ship was abandoned in the Indian Ocean before 17 July. All on board were rescued. She was on a voyage from Calcutta, India to Boston, Massachusetts
Chalcedony	United States	The barque was lost at Talcahuano, Chile.
Columbine	France	The barque was abandoned in the Atlantic Ocean before 29 July.
Elizabeth	United Kingdom	The ship was driven ashore and wrecked with the loss of at least five lives. She was on a voyage from Livorno, Grand Duchy of Tuscany to Gibraltar.
Enriqueta	Chile	The barque was lost at Maule.
Fanny	(United Kingdom of Great Britain and Ireland) New Zealand	The ship was wrecked on a reef off the Fiji Islands. Her crew were rescued.
George Bell	United Kingdom	The ship foundered in the North Sea before 9 July. Her crew were rescued. She was on a voyage from Newcastle upon Tyne, Northumberland to Saint Petersburg, Russia.
Lady Howden	(United Kingdom of Great Britain and Ireland) New South Wales	The brig was wrecked in the Fiji Islands.
Marshall	United States	The brig was wrecked at Bodega, Alta California.
Matilde	Chile	The brig was lost at San Antonio.
Minerva	(United Kingdom of Great Britain and Ireland) New South Wales	The schooner was wrecked at Ulladulla.
Nautilus	United Kingdom	The barque was wrecked on the coast of Sierra Leone. Her crew survived.
Obourne	United Kingdom	The ship was wrecked off Dominica. Her crew were rescued.
Pegasus	Flag unknown	The ship collided with another vessel and sank before 24 July with the loss of seven of her eight crew. She was on a voyage from Danzig to Antwerp, Belgium.
Porvoyeur	France	The ship was wrecked on the coast of Sardinia before 8 July. Her crew were rescued. She was on a voyage from La Spezia, Grand Duchy of Tuscany to Dunkirk, Nord.
Ruge Gardien	France	The ship sank at the mouth of the Loire before 13 July. She was on a voyage from Nantes, Loire-Inférieure to Caen, Calvados.
Progress	United Kingdom	The sloop was abandoned in the North Sea. She was towed in to Bridlington, Yorkshire on 13 July.
Superb	United Kingdom	The barque was wrecked 10 nautical miles (19 km) south of Maule.
Viceroy	United Kingdom	The ship ran aground on Kamawaska Island, British North America before 24 July. She was on a voyage from Liverpool, Lancashire to Quebec City, Province of Canada, British North America. She was refloated and completed her voyage, arriving on 27 July.
Westmoreland	United Kingdom	The ship was driven ashore near Cape Palos, Spain.
