= Shenden =

Shenden also known as Senden is a tourist rivers in Jepara Town, its in Mulyoharjo Village. located at 2 km eastward of the hall of Jepara Regency. Shenden is one of famous rivers in Jepara. Because, Shenden is a beautiful little river and natural and clean water that is made in a place to swim, shower, and water play. Shenden river there is also a mini waterfall.

== Located ==
Shenden is located near to the city center Jepara because this place is located in the Village area Mulyoharjo Jepara district of Jepara Regency.

== Nuance ==
Shenden is a place for excursions contained in Mulyoharjo village, Jepara district, Jepara regency. When we get there will be spoiled scenery are beautiful despite its place in city areas. Shenden there are many large trees, mini waterfall, and the river water is very clean.

Many visitors who travel to their usual Shenden bathing and swimming, there are also only take pictures, others just enjoy the atmosphere while a picnic with his friends, boyfriend, or family. Gurgling water and chirping birds make Shenden very reassuring to visitors.

== Panorama ==
river water flow staircase with it being in the middle of plantation residents. When the rainy season the river Shenden deep as ±2,5 meters, from the residential area to the Shenden must be reached by walking ±200 meters. When compared with rivers in general Jepara, Senden River offers a beautiful natural scenery.

Shenden more visitors in the dry season than in the rainy season. Because when the rainy season when taking a shower in the river to be able to master the technique Shenden swim, if you can not swim then sank, because in the rainy season the river shenden depth is 2.5 meters. And that is why many visitors come Shenden River during the dry season because of the depth of the river shenden ±1 meter, making it safe for visitors who can not swim can feel bathing in the river shenden.

== Tragedy ==
In rainy season never existed A student drowned in the river Shenden, because can not swim. Because the rainy season senden river depth reaches 2.5 meters. Therefore, it Shenden many visitors when in the dry season, as well as more secure because the water is not deep and there is no swift river currents, as well as to freshen up in the hot dry season.

== See also ==
- List of drainage basins of Indonesia
