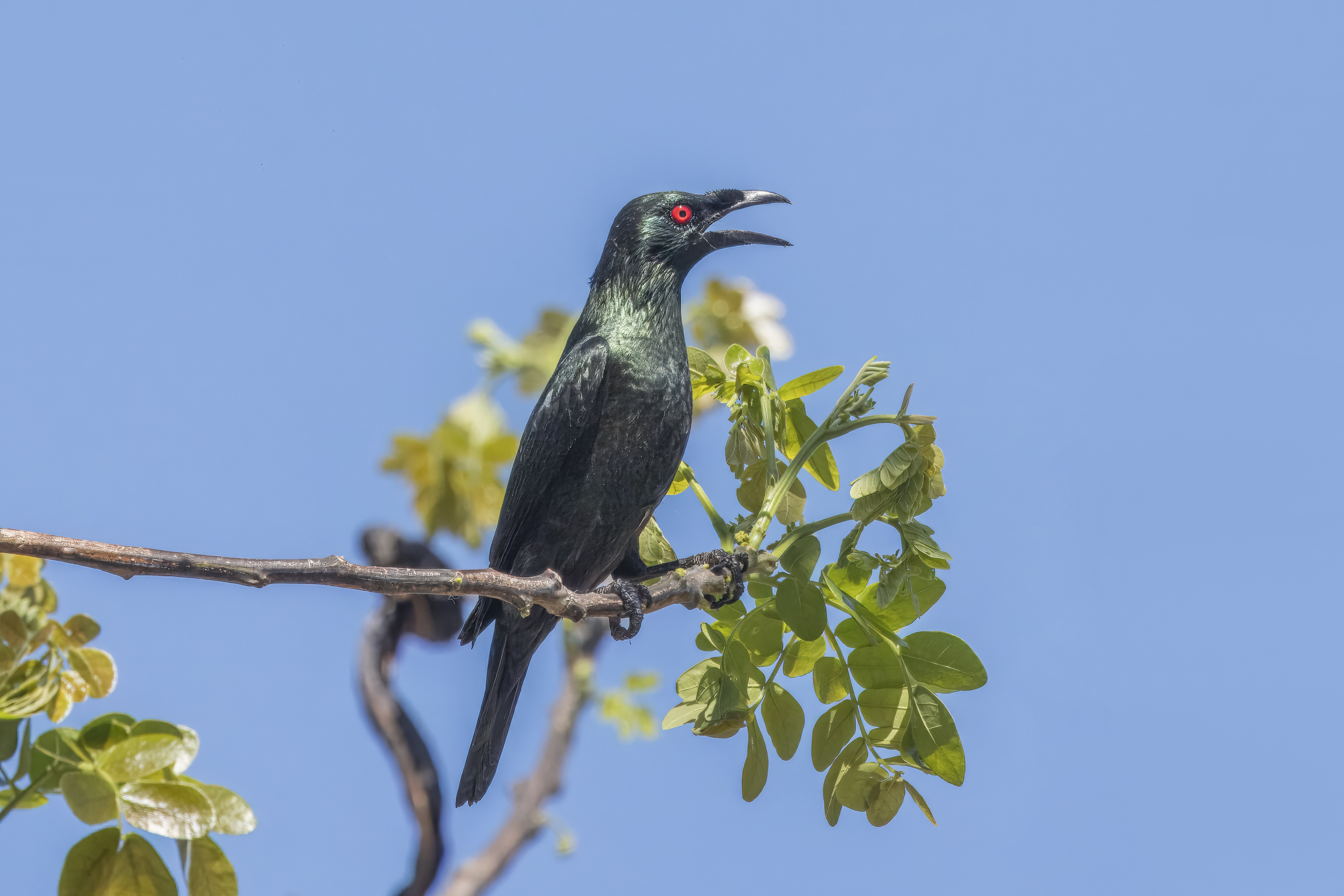
- A. p. panayensis

Conservation status
- Least Concern (IUCN 3.1)

Scientific classification
- Kingdom: Animalia
- Phylum: Chordata
- Class: Aves
- Order: Passeriformes
- Family: Sturnidae
- Genus: Aplonis
- Species: A. panayensis

Binomial name
- Aplonis panayensis (Scopoli, 1786)

= Asian glossy starling =

Species of bird

The Asian glossy starling (Aplonis panayensis) is a species of starling in the family Sturnidae. It is found in Bangladesh, Brunei, northeastern India (Assam), Indonesia, Malaysia, Myanmar, the Philippines, Singapore, Cambodia and Thailand. Its natural habitats are subtropical or tropical moist lowland forest and subtropical or tropical mangrove forest. It has also been introduced to Taiwan.

== Description ==
It is 20 cm long, and weighs 50–60 g. Adults (both sexes) have glossy black plumage; juveniles are blackish-brown above, whitish heavily streaked with dark brown below. The iris is bright red in adults, except for A. p. albiris, which has a white eye; in juveniles it is yellow, orange, or pink. The subspecies vary in extent and intensity of the plumage gloss, and in the size of the bill.

=== Subspecies ===
The following subspecies are recognised by the International Ornithological Congress:

- A. p. affinis (Blyth, 1876) – northeastern India, Bangladesh, southwestern Myanmar
- A. p. tytleri (Hume, 1873) – Andaman and north Nicobar Islands
- A. p. albiris Abdulali, 1967 – central and southern Nicobar Islands
- A. p. strigata (Horsfield, 1821) – Malay Peninsula, Sumatra, Java, and west Borneo
- A. p. altirostris (Salvadori, 1887) – Simeulue, Banyak Islands, and Nias Island
- A. p. nesodramus (Oberholser, 1926) – Babi Island
- A. p. pachistorhina (Oberholser, 1912) – Batu and Mentawai Islands
- A. p. enganensis (Salvadori, 1892) – Enggano Islands
- A. p. heterochlora (Oberholser, 1917) – Anambas and Natuna Islands
- A. p. eustathis (Oberholser, 1926) – east Borneo
- A. p. alipodis (Oberholser, 1926) – Panjang, Maratua and Derawan Islands
- A. p. gusti Stresemann, 1913 – Bali
- A. p. sanghirensis (Salvadori, 1876) – Sangihe and Talaud Islands

== Behaviour ==
This species often inhabits towns and cities, where they take refuge in abandoned buildings and trees. They often move in large groups and are considered one of the noisiest species of birds.

== Gallery ==
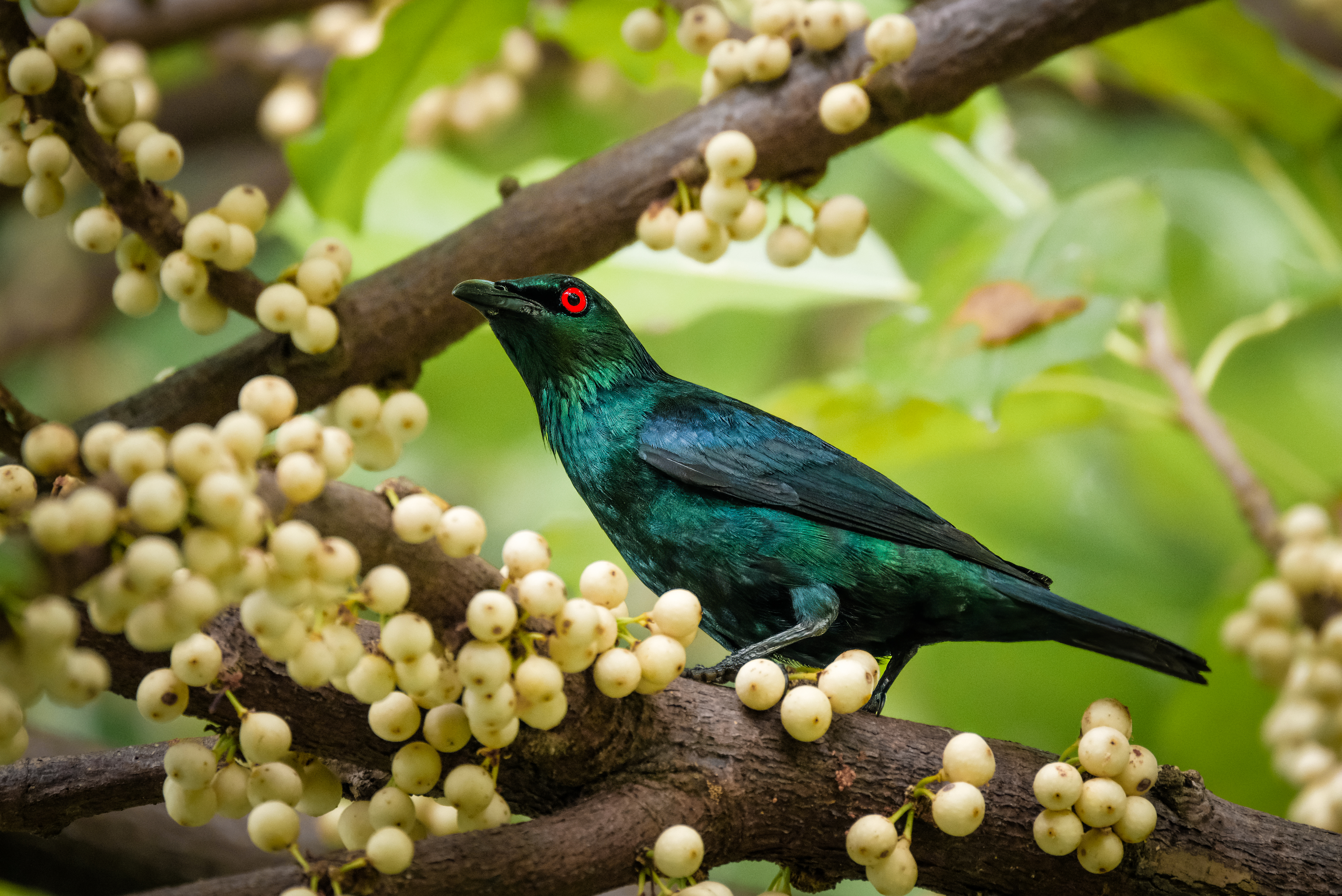
Adult

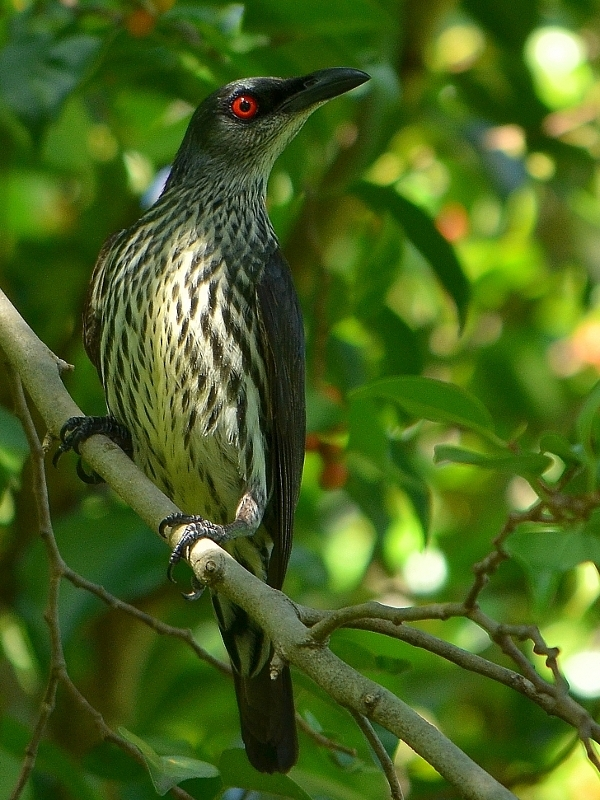
Immature

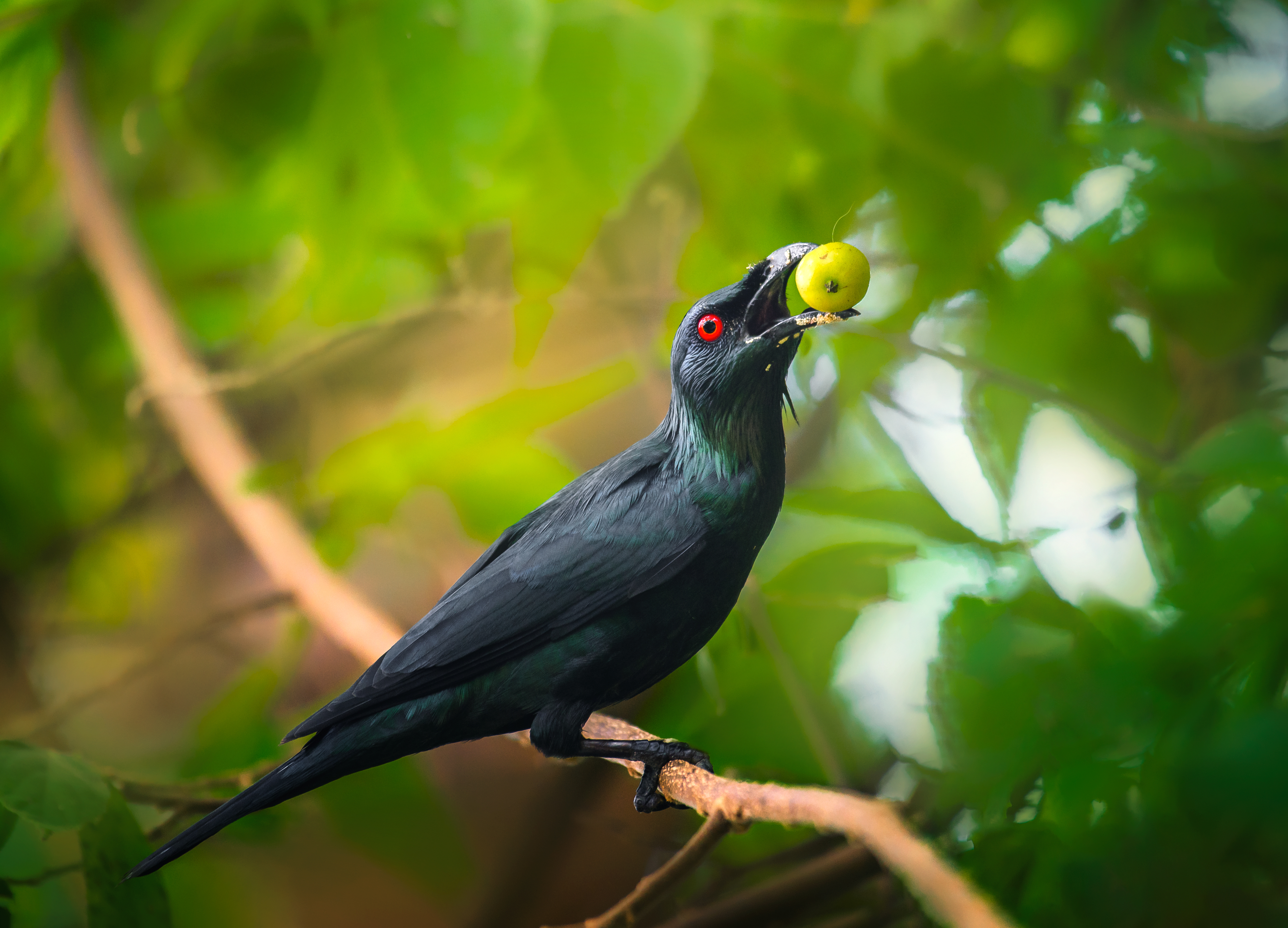
A. p. panayensis feeding

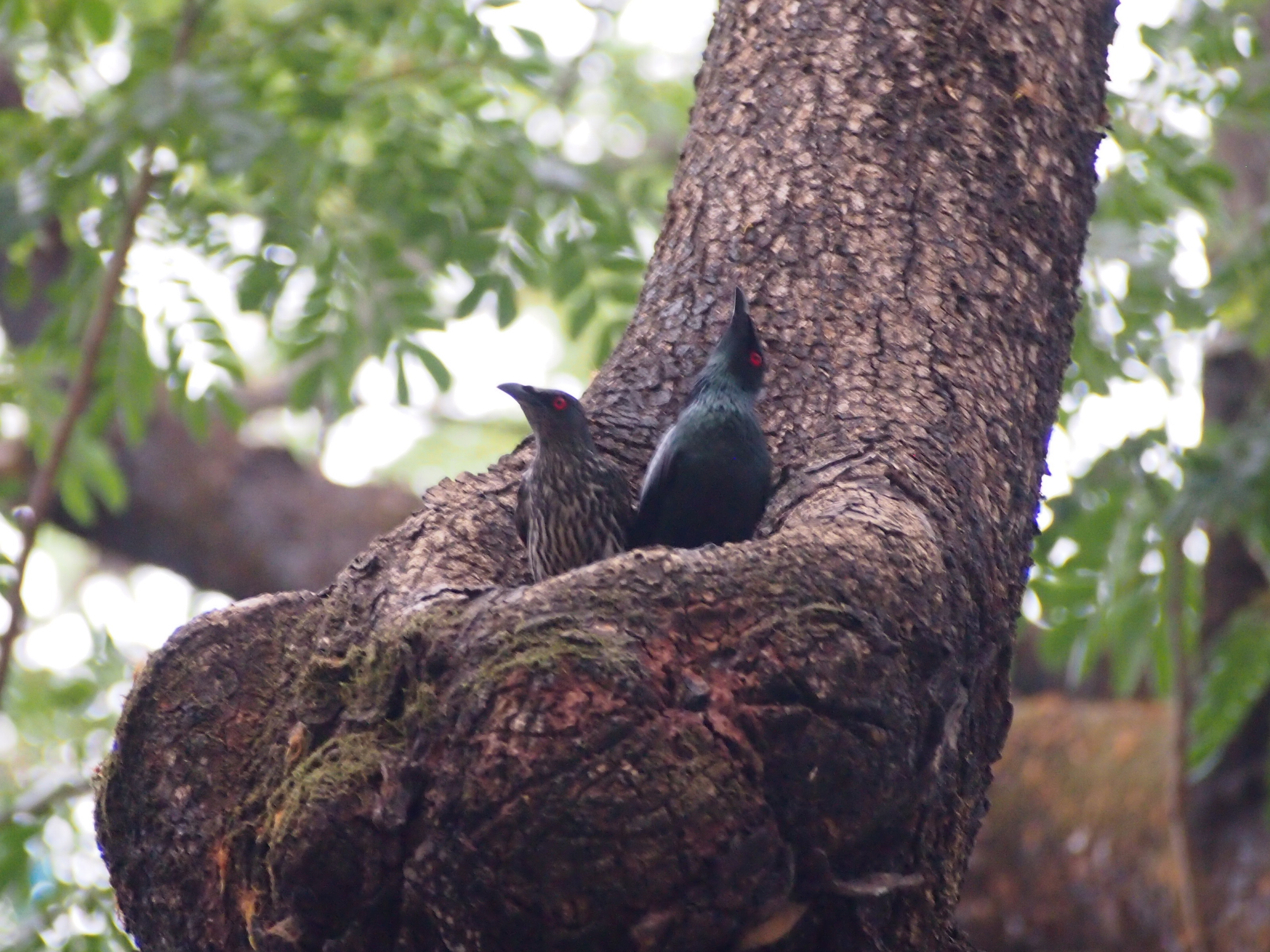
juvenile and adult
