= Songgo Langit Waterfall =

Coordinates: 6.5367°S 110.8608°E

Songgo Langit Waterfall is a waterfall located in Bucu, Kembang 48 km (30 mi) north of downtown Jepara Regency, this waterfall has a height of 80 m (260 ft) with a width of 2 m (6 ft 7 in). Surrounding this waterfall can be found a variety of butterflies.

== See also ==
- Tourism in Jepara, Indonesia
