= Kelan antep =

Indonesian dish

Kelan Antep
- Course: Main course
- Place of origin: Indonesia
- Region or state: Jeparanese, Central Java
- Serving temperature: Hot or room temperature
- Main ingredients: Lean meat, water, garlic, red onion, red pepper, tamarind, galangal, bay leaf.

Kelan Antep is traditional dish from Jepara City, Central Java, Indonesia.

== Ingredients ==
Kelan Antep is prepared using lean meat (beef, lamb or goat), water, garlic, red onion, red pepper, tamarind, galangal, and bay leaf. It can be served as a side dish or as a vegetable soup.
