= Mandalika Island =

Island in Central Java, Indonesia

- Location within Indonesia
- Coordinates: 6°22′00″S 110°55′00″E
- Country: Indonesia
- Province: Central Java
- Regency: Jepara
- Time zone: UTC+7 (WIB)

Mandalika Island is a small island in the Java Sea, which is about 2 kilometers distant from Donorejo village of Jepara Regency in Central Java, Indonesia. The island is situated in the north of Central Java coast, opposite to Portuguese Fort beach and close to Mount Muria. The island is just 500 meters from the fort and can be seen from there. The island has become a tourist attraction.

This island is partially forested and usually uninhabited. There are also temporary housing for fishermen. A light house is located on the island, mainly to guide local fishermen. There is a tomb of Syed Ustman, who was a nayaka (minister) of the Kingdom Kalinyamat. The beach of Mandalika island has crystal clear water, but rocky and steep, not suitable for swimming. There are variety of fishes and fishing is allowed.

Mandalika island can be reached by fishing boat. There is boat lines between Kartini Karimunjawa and Jepara, that passes between the Portuguese fort and Mandalika island. The time required to reach Mandalika island is about 30 minutes.
