= Mantingan Mosque =

Mosque in Jepara, Central Java, Indonesia

Masjid Mantingan
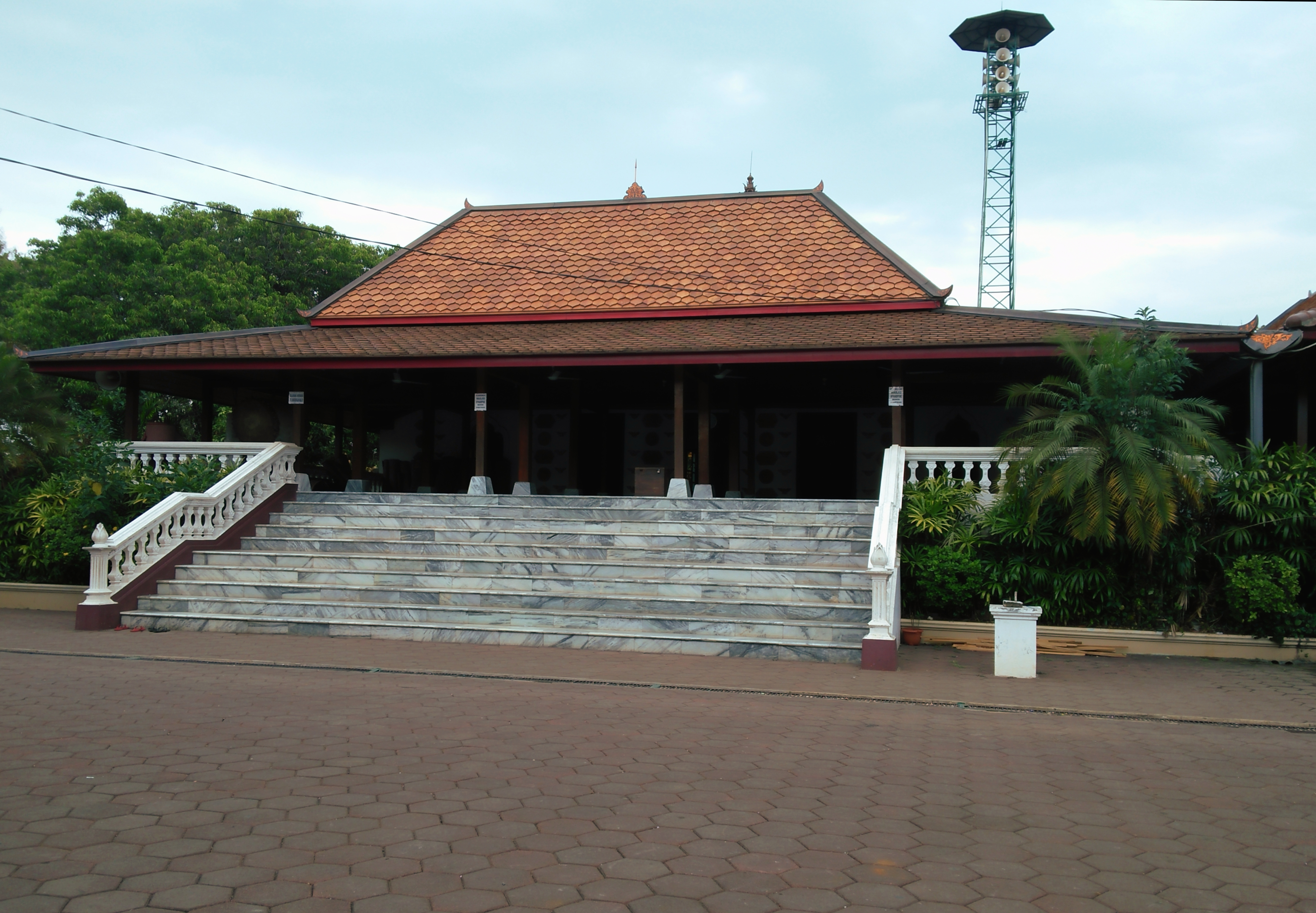

Religion
- Affiliation: Islam
- Branch/tradition: Sunni

Location
- Location: Jepara, Indonesia
- Administration: Jepara government

Architecture
- Type: Mosque
- Established: 1481 Saka, i.e. 1559 CE
- Minaret: 0

Masjid Mantingan (or Mantingan Mosque) is one of the oldest mosques in Indonesia, located in the center town of Jepara, Central Java, Indonesia. The mosque is believed to have been built by Sunan Hadlirin in the era of the Kalinyamat Kingdom in 1559 CE, based on a chronogram that was once located at the top of the prayer niche (mihrab).
