= Portuguese Fort (Jepara) =

Fort in Banyumanis, Indonesia

Coordinates: 6°24′13″S 110°55′5″E

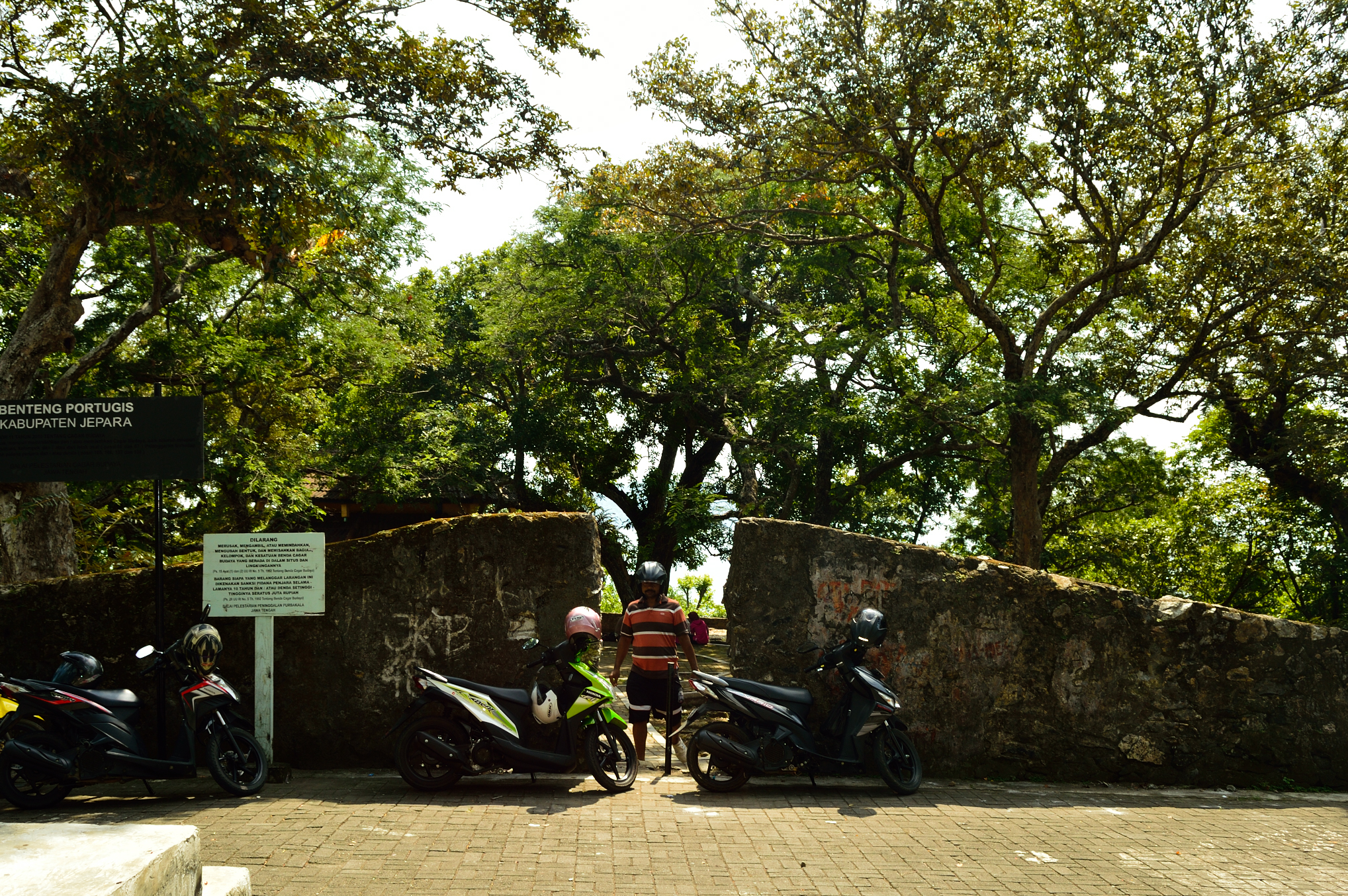
The entrance to the Portuguese Fort

The so-called Portuguese Fort, or Benteng Portugis, is a historical fort located in the village Banyumanis adjacent to the village of Ujung Batu, District of Keling, Jepara Regency, the province of Central Java, Indonesia. It is said that the fortress was built by the Government Mataram in 1613–1645, with partnership of the Portuguese (hence the name) as the central defense to repel the enemy who came from Java Sea (referring to the Dutch) .

Currently the Portuguese Fort is one of the leading tourist destination of Jepara. Location of the fort is also adjacent to Mandalika Island.
