= Kartini Muljadi =

Indonesian businesswoman and corporate lawyer (1930–2025)

- Born: 17 May 1930; Surabaya, Dutch East Indies
- Died: 20 October 2025 (aged 95); Jakarta, Indonesia
- Occupations: Businesswoman, lawyer
- Known for: Owner of Tempo Scan Pacific

Kartini Muljadi (17 May 1930 – 20 October 2025) was an Indonesian businesswoman and corporate lawyer. She previously worked as a judge and notary, and later became the owner of Tempo Scan Pacific, one of Indonesia's largest pharmaceutical and consumer goods companies. From 2007, she was recognised as one of the richest women in Indonesia.

== Early life and education ==
Kartini was born Pauline Fanny Kho on 17 May 1930 in Surabaya, Eastern Java, the Dutch East Indies. Her parents were Budi Tjahono and Marianne Han. Her mother, who has Han Surabaya/Pasuruan ancestry through her mother, was a teacher at a local school. Her father worked as an accountant for the colony's electricity company, Algemene Nederlandsch Indische Electriciteit Maatschappij.

When Kartini was about two-and-a-half years old, her mother died. Her father then married a woman of Chinese descent, who worked as a trader and taught Kartini to work industriously, especially during the Japanese occupation of the Dutch East Indies when there was no school. Her father encouraged her to save money.

After Indonesia's 1945 declaration of independence, when ethnic Chinese citizens were encouraged to adopt Indonesian names, her father changed his name from Kho (Xu in Chinese) to Budi Tjahjono, while Pauline Fanny Kho became Kartini, choosing the name of pioneering Indonesian feminist Kartini.

Kartini and her brother were among a few non-Dutch children permitted to attend a European school, where they studied Indonesian, Dutch, English, German and French, before opting for elective mathematics.

Kartini also studied in Surabaya and Yogyakarta, before moving to Jakarta, where she majored in Law and Social Sciences at the University of Indonesia. During her studies, she worked at Candra Naya Social Organization (established 1946 as Sin Ming Hui), which provided health and legal services for the poor. She received her law degree in 1958.

== Judicial career ==
In 1958, Kartini was appointed a judge at Jakarta Special Court, where she was assigned to handle criminal, civil and bankruptcy cases. At that time, Dutch judges had been replaced by Indonesian judges. She served on the court until 1970 and had a reputation for not being corrupt.

During her time as a judge, she undertook notary studies at the University of Indonesia, completing her course in 1967.

Following the death on 21 February 1973 of her husband, Djojo Muljadi, who was a notary, Kartini resigned as a civil servant because her income was insufficient to cover her family's needs. She was appointed a notary domiciled in Jakarta. Her clients included state-owned companies such as Widya Karya and multinationals such as Unilever. She also began to lecture in civil procedural law at various law faculties in Jakarta. She became a prominent notary, working for major companies in the 1970s and 1980s.

In 1990, she retired as a notary and established her own law office and legal consultancy, named Muljadi & Rekan. Her clients included large national and multinational companies. When the 1997 Asian financial crisis struck, she provided legal guidance to the banking sector. She was part of a team that provided legal advice to the Indonesian Bank Restructuring Agency (IBRA). She also provided legal opinions and recommendations to government agencies and shareholders of insolvent banks. She has also advisor to the World Bank.

Kartini was involved in drafting laws, such as the Limited Liability Company Law and the Bankruptcy Law.

== Cosmetics and pharmaceuticals business ==
During her studies in Jakarta, Kartini worked at a beauty salon owned by a Dutch woman married to an Indonesian doctor. The Dutch woman taught her how to make cosmetics. When the woman went back to the Netherlands, Kartini took over the business, paying for it in installments and bought its trademark. This business became Tempo Scan, which was established in 1953. Later renamed Tempo Scan Pacific, it became one of Indonesia's leading pharmaceutical firms. The group's branded pharmaceutical products include Bodrex and Hemaviton. Cosmetics include Marina brand body lotion and the My Baby range of oils, powders and wipes.

In 2007, Kartini was ranked 28th on Forbes' list of richest Indonesians, with wealth of $260 million. In 2008, she was ranked 32nd, with a fortune of $130 million. In 2019, Kartini was listed 48th on Forbes' list of 50 richest Indonesians, with a fortune of $630 million. She was the highest-ranked woman on the list.

== Sumber Waras case ==
In November 1970, Candra Naya Social Organization (PSCN) head Padmo Sumasto granted a 32,372-square-meter plot of land in Grogol, West Jakarta, to Sumber Waras Foundation. He canceled the decision in September 1999, taking back the land for PSCN. Later, when Kartini became head of Sumber Waras Foundation, she filed a police report against new PSCN head, I Wayan Suparmin, alleging he had embezzled a certificate for the land. Sumber Waras Foundation held a certificate for 3.7 hectares of land adjacent to the disputed plot. In 2014, it sold the 3.7-hectare (9.1-acre) plot to Jakarta administration for Rp775.69 billion ($55.9 million). The city administration planned to build a cancer hospital on the site, but could not access the site from a main road unless it also purchased the disputed land held by PSCN. In the sale and purchase agreement, Sumber Waras said the city administration could use the entrance gate on the disputed land.

On 23 September 2015, West Jakarta District Court ruled the disputed land to be held by Sumber Waras Foundation and sentenced Wayan to 18 months in jail. On 16 November 2015, Jakarta High Court overturned the decision, returned the certificate to Wayan and cleared him of embezzlement. Separately, the State Audit Agency (BPK) claimed the 3.7 hectares had been sold at an allegedly inflated price, causing the city to suffer losses of Rp191 billion. The BPK report was submitted to the Corruption Eradication Commission (KPK). In April 2016, KPK questioned Kartini over the case. She reportedly said that she received only Rp335 billion of the total land purchase price of Rp775.69 billion. KPK later said it found no evidence of wrongdoing in the sale. In January 2017, West Jakarta District Court ruled Sumber Waras Foundation had legally sold the land without needing to involve PSCN.

== Personal life and death ==
Kartini was married to Djojo Muljadi (Liem Tjing Hien, 1915–1973), who was a notary and had served as secretary of Sing Ming Hui in 1950 and as its president from 1953 to 1955. They had four children: Sutjipto Husodo Muljadi, Dian Mulyani Muljadi, Gunawan S. Muljadi and Handojo Selamet Muljadi.

Oldest son Sutjipto owns oil services company PT Mulia Graha Abadi. Daughter Dian is a magazine editor and socialite and runs an online media portal called Fimela. Third child, Gunawan, runs Kartini's law firm and GNC company in Indonesia together with his wife Nancy. Youngest son, Handojo, leads Tempo Scan Pacific.

Kartini had 10 grandchildren. Shawn Muljadi, Tania Muljadi, and Richard Muljadi are the children of Sutjipto. Putri Soedarjo, Mita Soedarjo, and Dita Soedarjo are the children of Dian. Evy (a.k.a. Kaden) is the only daughter of Gunawan. Lastly, Handojo has three sons; Winston, Howard, and Stuart.

Kartini was the grandmother of controversial socialite Richard Muljadi, who gained notoriety for showing off his lavish spending habits on social media, including buying a Mitsubishi Outlander car for one of his pet dogs. Richard was in August 2018 arrested for snorting cocaine in the toilet of a restaurant at South Jakarta's Pacific Place mall. He was sentenced in February 2019 to 18 months of rehabilitation.

Muljadi died on 20 October 2025, at the age of 95.

== Awards ==
In 2004, President Megawati Sukarnoputri presented the Capital Market Lifetime Achievement Award to Kartini in recognition of her law firm's development of the Master Settlement and Master Refinancing Agreement that was used to rescue banks that had foundered during the 1997-98 economic crisis.

== Books ==
Kartini is credited with authoring several books on Indonesian law.

- Kebendaan Pada Umumnya (2003). On property and collateral security according to Indonesian civil law.
- Hak Tanggungan (2005). On mortgage law in Indonesia.
- Hak-Hak Atas Tanah (2004). On land tenure and titles in Indonesia.
- Kedudukan Berkuasa & Hak Milik dalam Sudut Pandang KUH Perdata (2004). Ownership and property rights under Indonesian civil law.
- Perikatan Pada Umumnya (2003). Contract law in Indonesia.
- Jual Beli (2003). Co-authored with Gunawan Widjaja. On trade contracts under Indonesian commercial laws and regulations.

In May 2017, in celebration of her 87th birthday, Kartini launched a book titled Batik Indonesia, Sepilihan Koleksi Batik Kartini Muljadi (Indonesian Batiks, Kartini Muljadi's Selected Batik Collection).
