= Panjang Island (Jepara) =

Island in Indonesia

Coordinates: 5°56′S 106°09′E

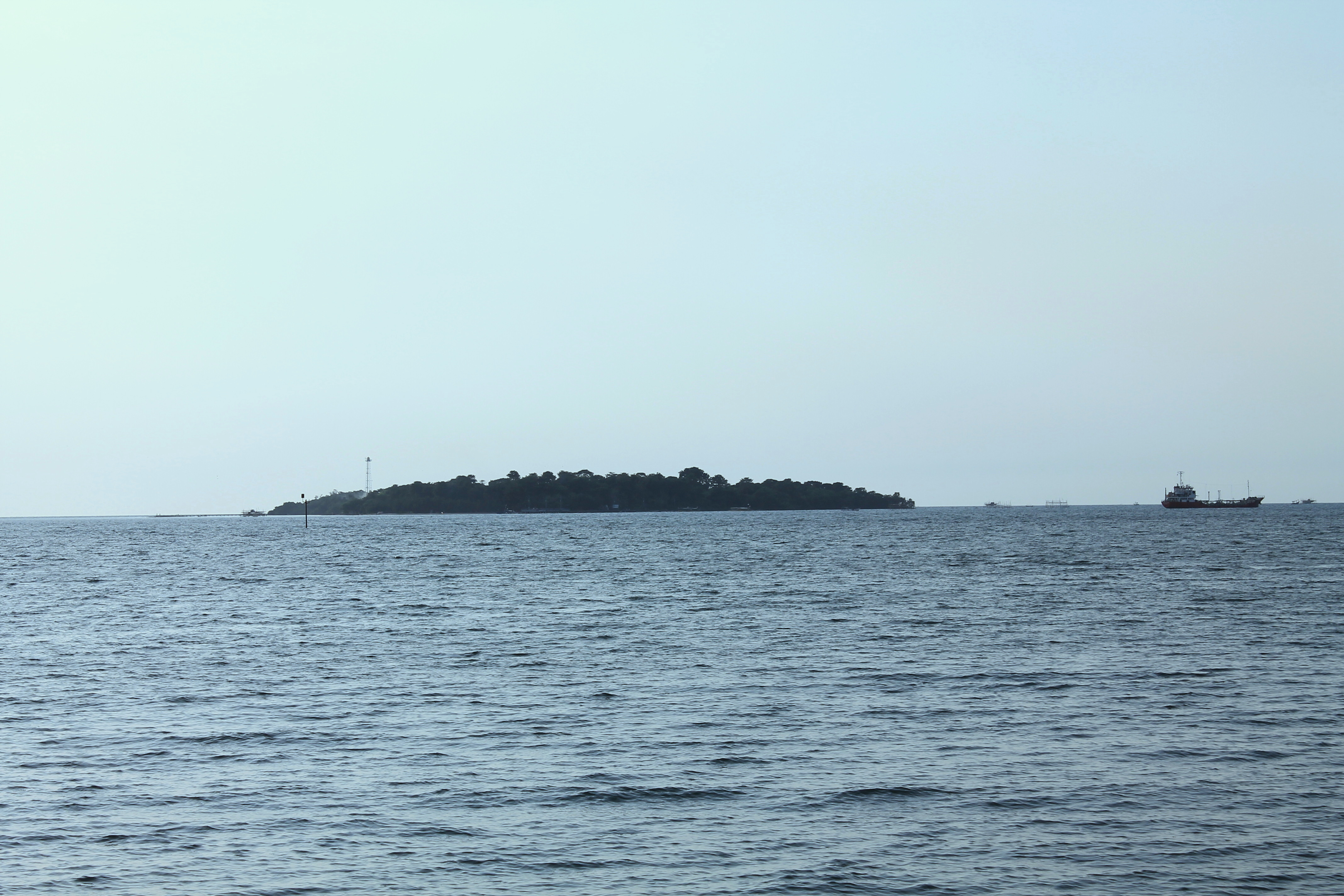

Panjang Island is an island located in Jepara, Central Java, Indonesia. The island has an area of 19 hectares (47 acres) and is located 1.5 nautical miles (2.8 km; 1.7 mi) from Kartini Beach, Jepara.

== Geography ==
Panjang Island has white sand and is surrounded by shallow seas and coral reefs. There is a tropical forest in the island's centre, with large trees interspersed with shrubs and bushes. It is as a breeding place for sea birds. The flora on the island is dominated by cotton, tamarind, dadap, and pine trees.
