= Kartini Beach =

Beach in Java, Indonesia

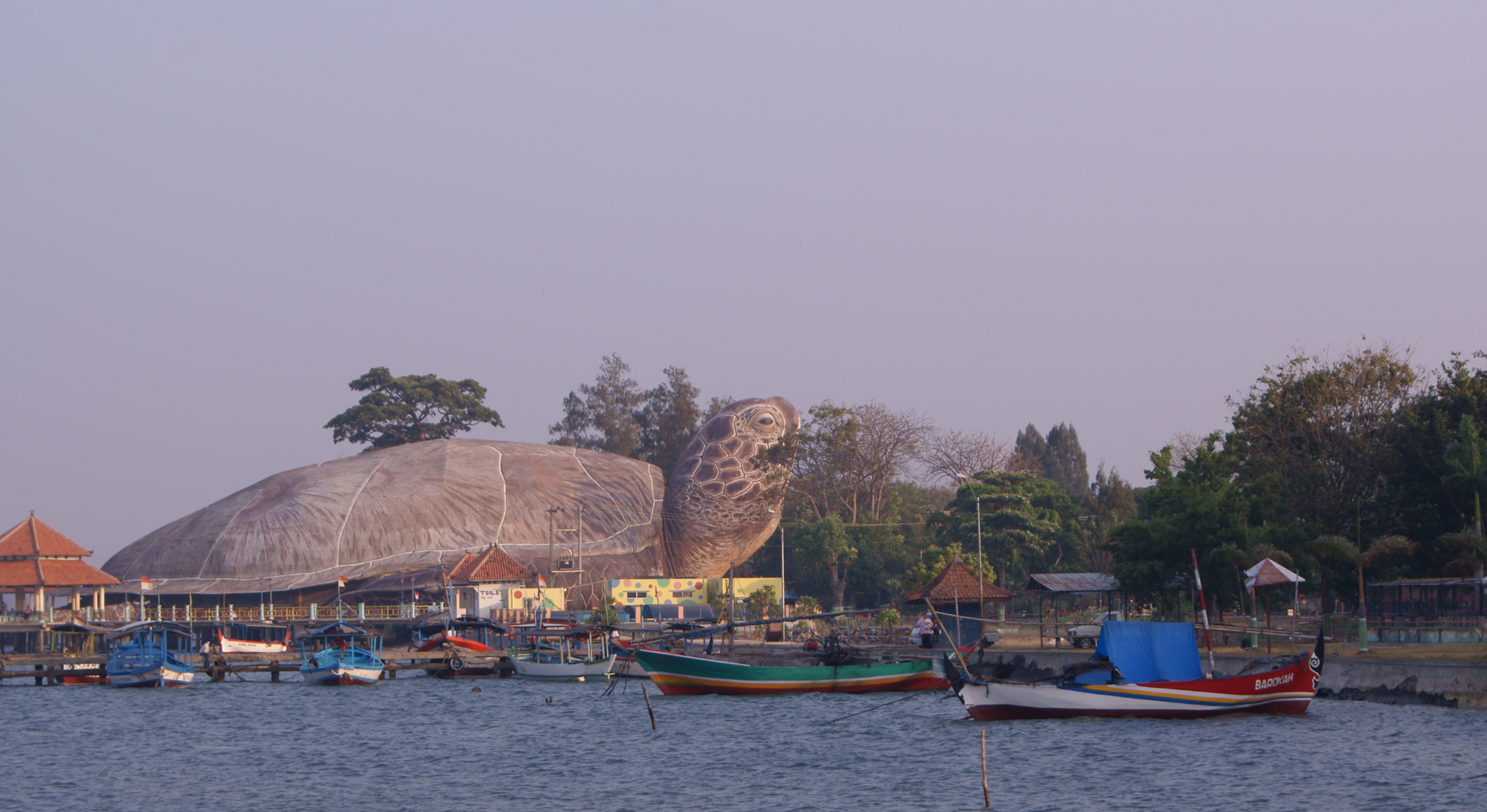
View of Kartini Beach

Kartini Beach is a tourist beach in Bulu, Jepara, Central Java. This beach is located 2.5 km west of the hall of the Office of the Regent of Jepara.

Regions with an area of 3.5 ha of land is a strategic area, because as the sea transportation routes to the National marine park attractions karimunjawa and Panjang Island. In addition Kartini Beach, can not escape from a traditional event called the "th". This event is the Jepara community cultural events that took place during one day, exactly on the 8th of Shawwal or the week after the Eid al-Fitr. Kartini Beach is also called "the Baths" located on the west coast Kartini, because it was originally used as a trusted public baths to cure rheumatic diseases, itching.
