= Tirto Samodra Beach =

Beach in Central Java, Indonesia

Tirto Samudro beach or Bandengan Beach is located 7 kilometres (4.3 mi) north of downtown Jepara, Central Java, Indonesia.

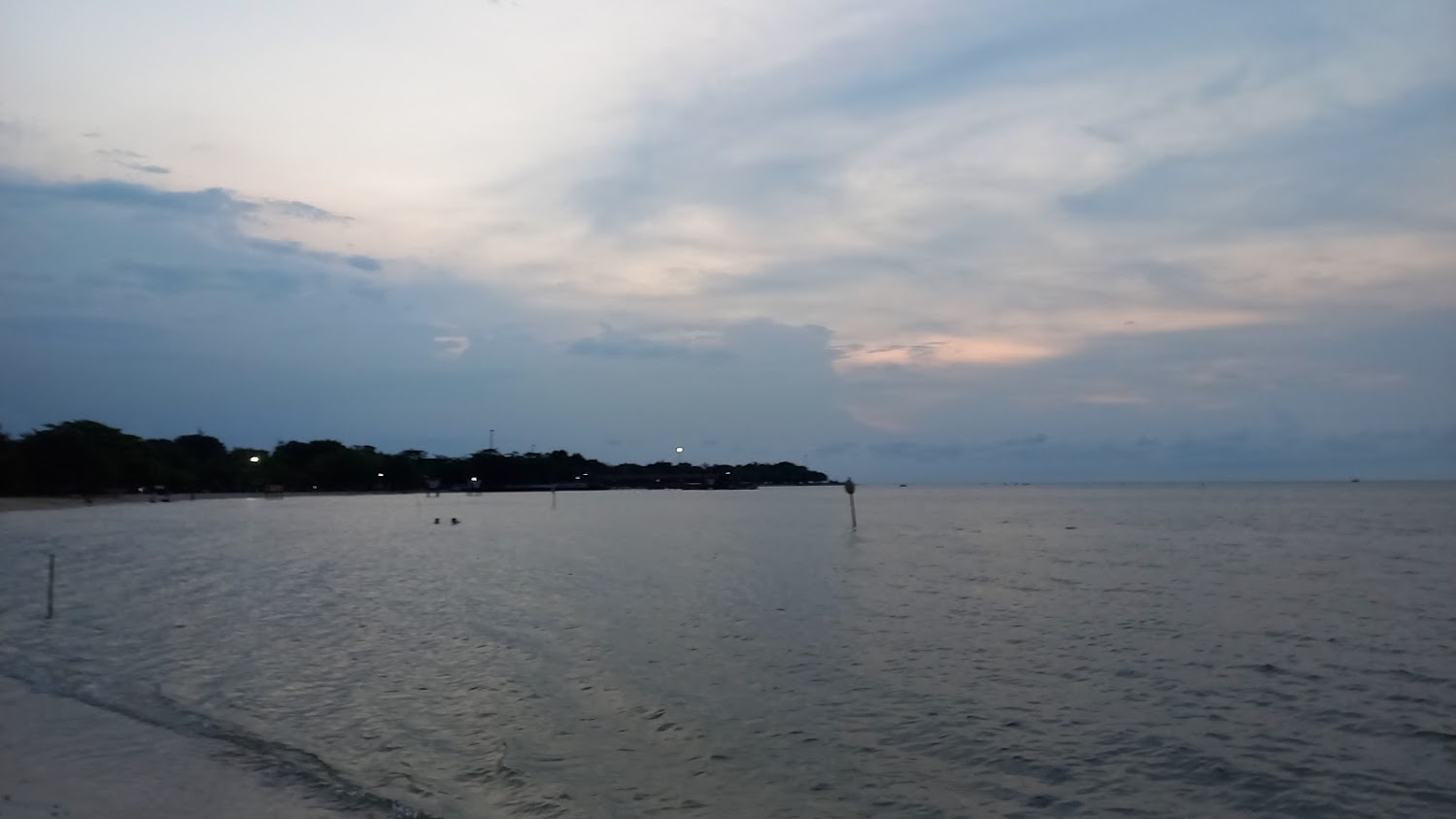
Pantai Bandengan during sunset time

It has a concentration of Hotel and Resort and quite popular for Beach tourism in Central Java.
