= Jepara Regency =

Regency in Central Java, Indonesia

Jepara Regency Kabupaten Jepara
- Regency
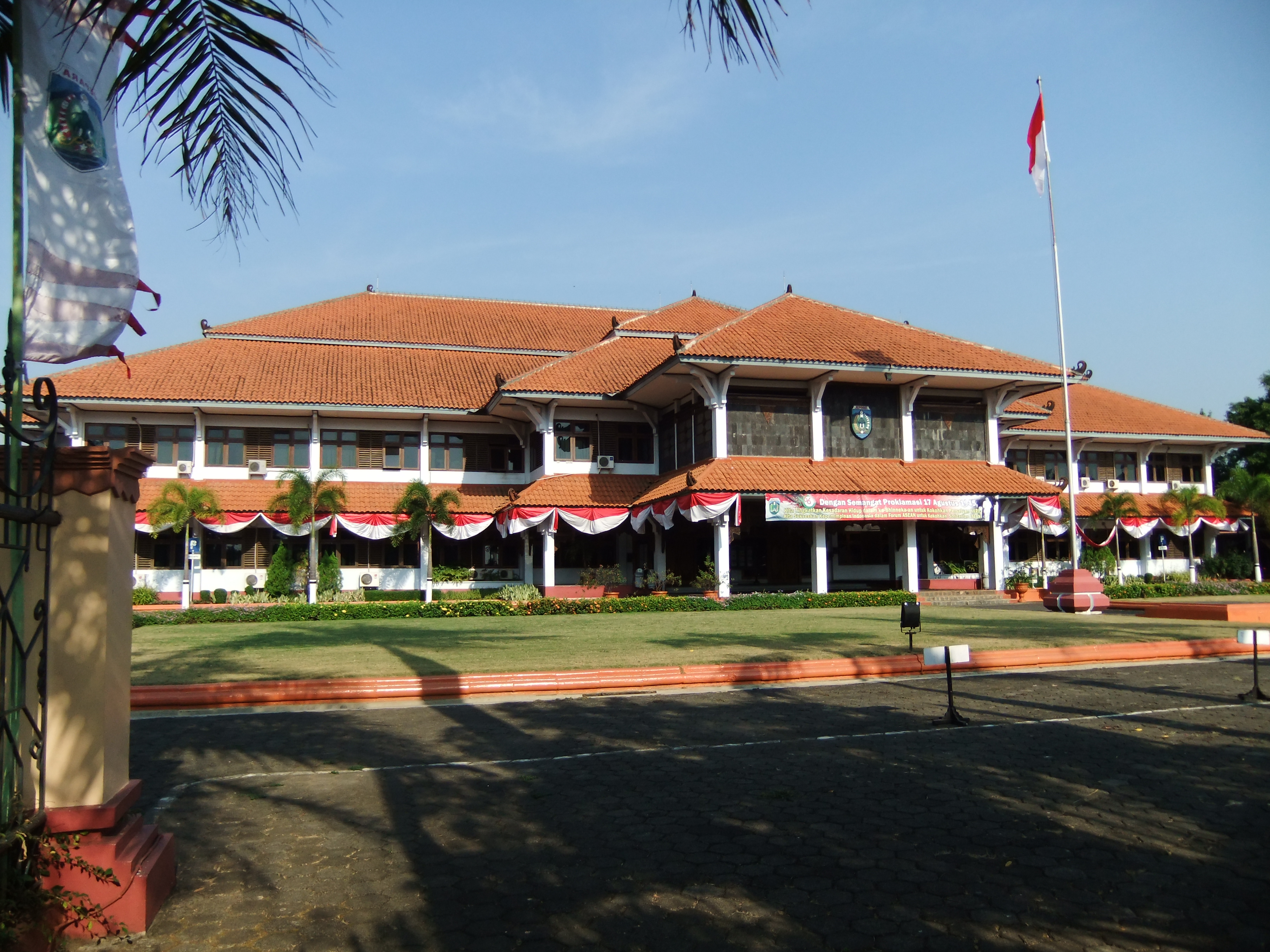

- Coat of arms
- Motto: Trus Karyo Tataning Bumi (Javanese: Keep working hard to build regional)
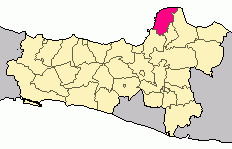
- Location of Jepara Regency in Central Java
- Coordinates: 6°32′0″S 110°40′0″E
- Country: Indonesia
- Province: Central Java
- Capital: Jepara

Government
  - Regent: Witiarso Utomo
  - Vice Regent: Muhammad Ibnu Hajar

Area
  - Total: 1,020.25 km^{2} (393.92 sq mi)

Population (mid 2025 estimate)
  - Total: 1,296,076
  - Density: 1,270.35/km^{2} (3,290.19/sq mi)
- Time zone: UTC+7 (WIB)
- Area code: +62 291 (mainland) +62 297 (Karimun Java)
- Website: jeparakab.go.id

Jepara (Javanese: ꦗꦼꦥꦫ) is a regency in the northeast of the Indonesian province of Central Java. It covers a land area of 1,020.25 km^{2} and had a population of 1,097,280 at the 2010 census and 1,184,947 at the 2020 census; the official estimate as at mid 2025 was 1,296,076 (comprising 651,734 males and 644,342 females). Its capital is Jepara town.

== History ==
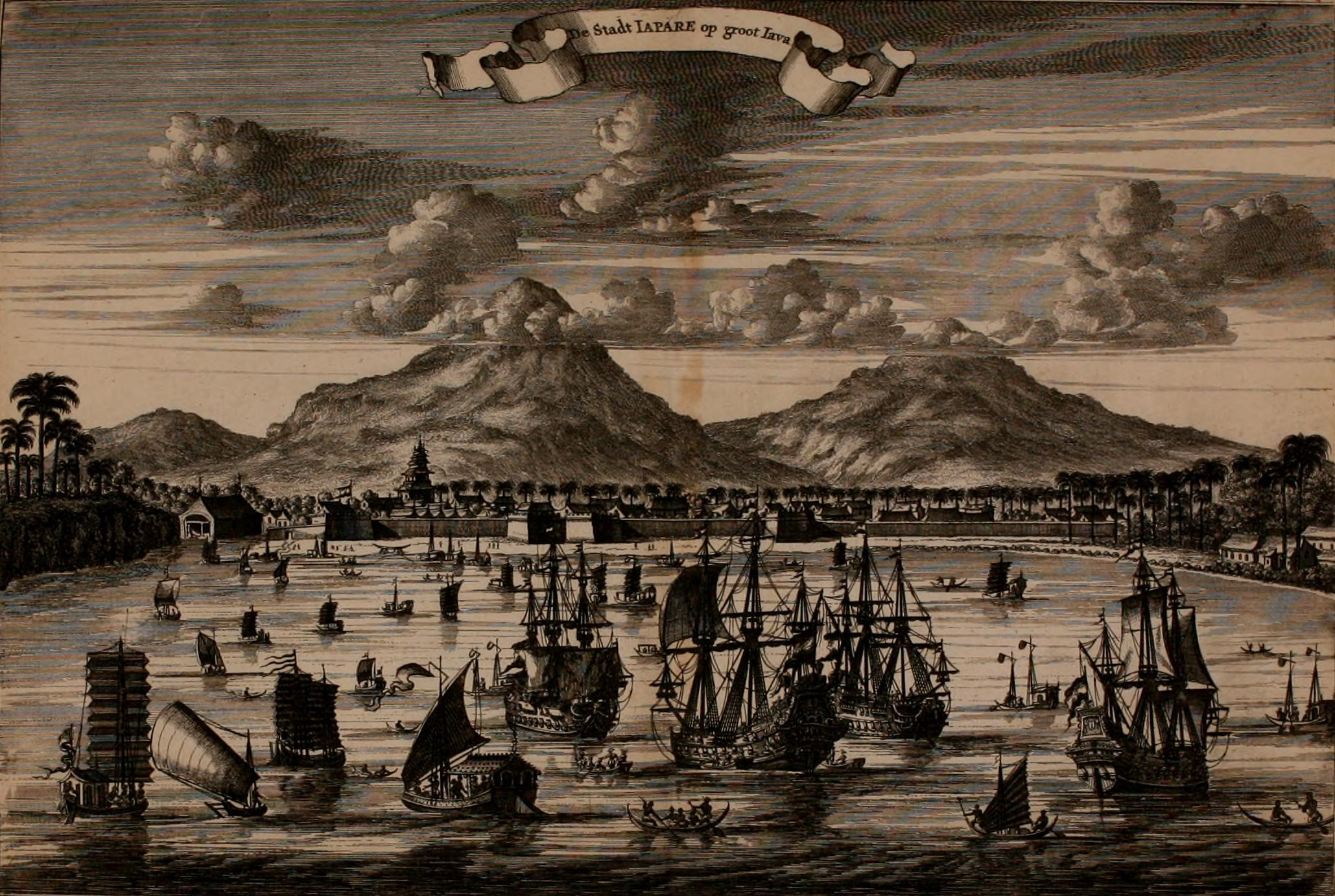
Jepara city views around the year 1650

People believed to have come from South Yunnan region migrated into the northern tip of Java during a time when Jepara was still separated by the Juwana Strait.

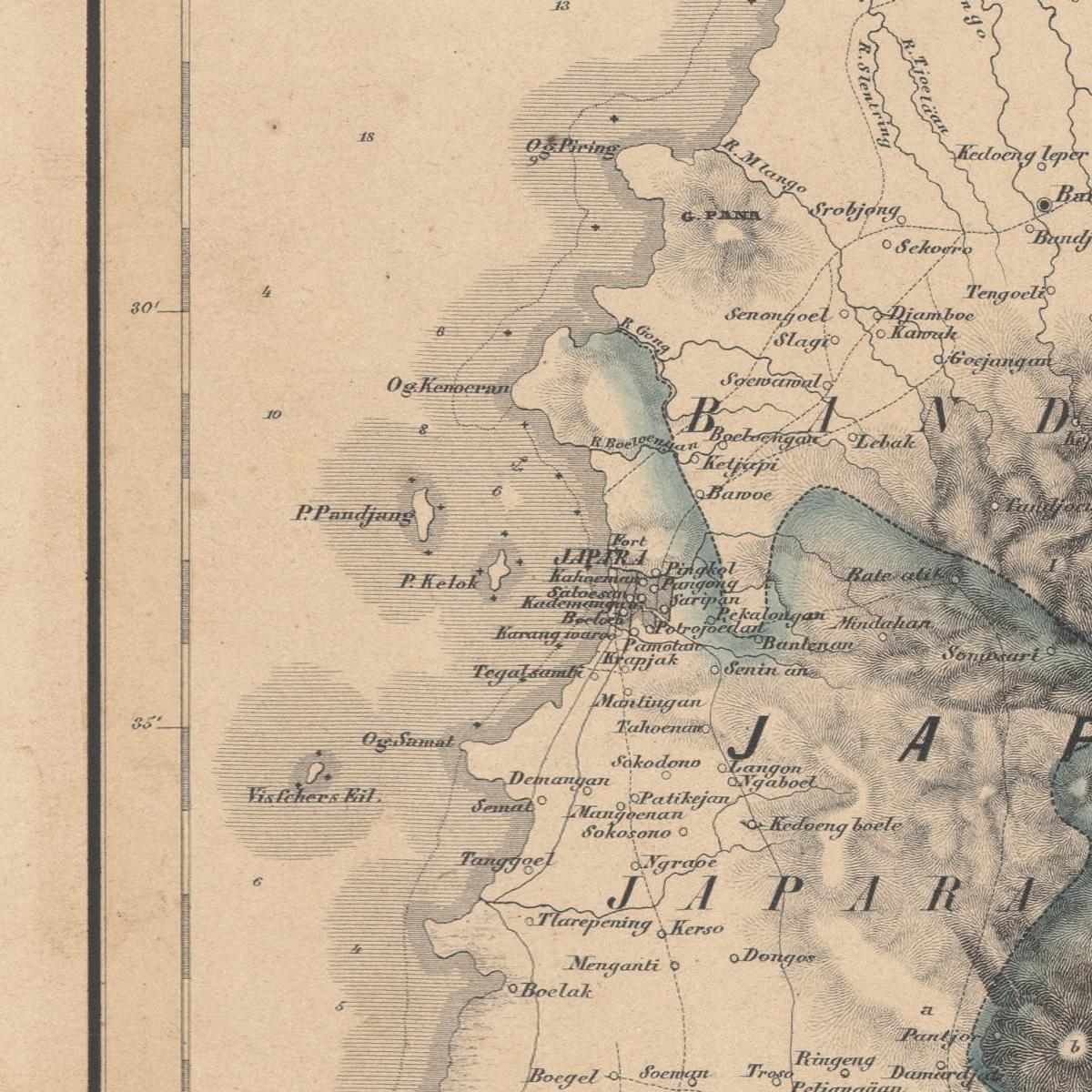
1858 map of Jepara

In the 16th century, Jepara was an important port; in early 1513, its king, Yunnus (Pati Unus) led an attack against Portuguese Malacca. His force is said to have been made up of one hundred ships and 5000 men from Jepara and Palembang but was defeated. Between 1518 and 1521 he apparently ruled over Demak. The rule of Ratu ('Queen') Kalinyamat in the latter 16th century was, however, Jepara's most influential. Jepara again attacked Malacca in 1551 this time with Johor but was defeated, and in 1574 besieged Malacca for three months.

The regency is the birthplace of Indonesian national heroine Kartini.

== Geography ==
Jepara Regency is located in the northeastern coastal region of Central Java, bordering Java Sea in the north and west, Kudus Regency and Pati Regency in the east, and Demak Regency in the south. The eastern border is primarily a mountainous region, with the most notable peak being Mount Muria. The regency also includes the Karimunjawa Archipelago, itself recognized as an administrative district, located in the Java Sea approximately 80 kilometres northwest from the mainland part of Jepara Regency.

== Administrative districts ==
Jepara Regency comprises sixteen districts (kecamatan), tabulated below with their areas and their populations at the 2010 census and the 2020 census, together with the official estimates as at mid 2025. The table also includes the locations of the district administrative centres, the number of administrative villages in each district (totaling 184 rural desa and 11 urban kelurahan - the latter all in Jepara town district), and its post code.

Kode Wilayah	Name of District (kecamatan)	Area in km^{2}	Pop'n census 2010	Pop'n census 2020	Pop'n estimate mid 2025	Admin centre	No. of villages	Post code
33.20.01	Kedung	45.71	70,835	77,052	84,967	Bugel	18	59463
33.20.02	Pecangaan	37.08	77,172	82,924	92,810	Lebuawu	12	59460
33.20.13	Kalinyamatan	25.03	58,140	61,087	67,471	Margoyoso	12	59462
33.20.03	Welahan	29.21	69,496	75,971	83,925	Kalipucang Kulon	15	59464
33.20.04	Mayong	70.66	82,831	90,788	100,619	Pelemkerep	18	59465
33.20.12	Nalumsari	55.25	68,606	74,737	83,731	Gemiring Lor	15	59466
33.20.05	Batealit	96.20	77,923	84,741	93,618	Mindahan	11	59461
33.20.11	Tahunan	42.69	101,581	108,962	119,013	Tahunan	15	59421 -59451
33.20.06	Jepara (town)	27.05	79,508	81,838	86,537	Panggang	16	59411 -59432
33.20.07	Mlonggo	47.52	77,794	83,732	91,086	Jambu	8	59452
33.20.15	Pakis Aji	65.18	54,690	60,144	65,713	Lebak	8	59450
33.20.08	Bangsri	90.79	93,798	99,965	107,702	Bangsri	12	59453
33.20.14	Kembang	118.77	64,798	70,530	75,704	Jinggotan	11	59457
33.20.09	Keling	121.09	58,435	68,047	68,864	Kelet	12	59456
33.20.16	Donorojo	101.41	52,958	58,581	63,433	Tulakan	8	59454
33.20.10	Karimunjawa	46.62	8,715	9,789	10,883	Karimunjawa	4	59455
	Totals	1,020.25	1,097,280	1,184,947	1,296,076	Jepara	195	

Note: (a) comprises 11 urban kelurahan (Bapangan, Bulu, Demaan, Jobokuto, Karangkebagusan, Kauman, Panggang, Pengkol, Potroyudan, Saripan and Ujungbatu) and 5 rural desa.

== Contemporary Jepara ==
The population is almost entirely Javanese and over 95% Muslim. As a pesisir ('coastal') area many traders from around the world landed in Jepara centuries ago.

== Tourism ==
Tourism in Jepara is an important component of the economy of Jepara and a significant source of tax revenue. Jepara is a town which is known for its culinary, education, tourism, and rich cultural heritage. There are many possibilities and opportunities for the city to prosper and benefit more, but yet until now the government has not yet fully utilized them. Jepara, although only a small town, has many tourist attractions, with the mountain tourism, beach tourism, underwater tours, tour of the islands. Foreign tourists often visit Tirto Samodra Beach (Bandengan Beach), Karimunjawa Islands (Crimon Java), Kartini Beach, etc.
