= Aviation in Indonesia =

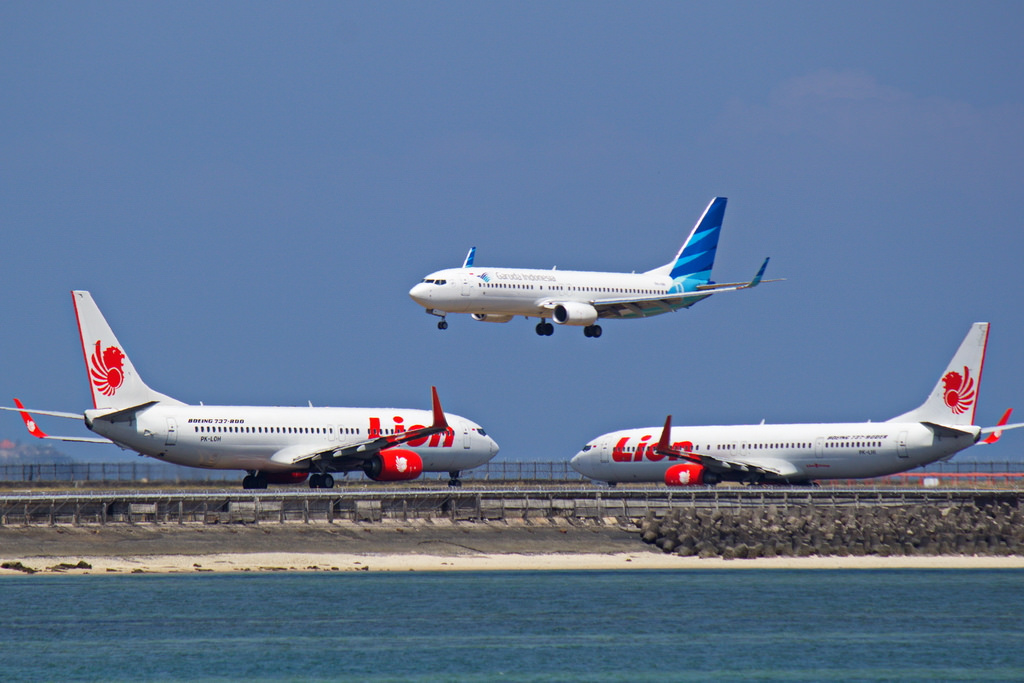
Garuda Indonesia and Lion Air airplanes at Ngurah Rai International Airport, Bali in August 2014

Aviation in Indonesia serves as a critical means of connecting the thousands of islands throughout the archipelago. Indonesia is the largest archipelagic country in the world, extending 5,120 kilometres (3,181 mi) from east to west and 1,760 kilometres (1,094 mi) from north to south, comprising 13,466 islands, with 922 of those permanently inhabited. (Note: Based on "Seminar Nasional Penetapan Nama Pulau-pulau Kecil Dalam Presektif Sejarah or "National Seminar on naming smaller islands regarded from historical perspective", 16 to 18 July 2008 at Palembang, South Sumatra, Indonesia) With an estimated population of over 255 million people — making it the world's fourth-most-populous country — and also due to the growth of the middle-class, the boom of low-cost carriers in the recent decade, and overall economic growth, many domestic travellers shifted from land and sea transport to faster and more comfortable air travel. Indonesia is widely regarded as an emerging market for air travel in the region. Between 2009 and 2014, the number of Indonesian air passengers increased from 27,421,235 to 94,504,086, an increase of over threefold.

However, safety issues continue to be a persistent problem in Indonesian aviation. Several accidents have given Indonesia's air transport system the reputation of the least safe in the world. Indonesian aviation faces numerous challenges, including poorly maintained, outdated, and often overwhelmed infrastructure, the factor of human error, bad weather, haze problems caused by plantation fires, and volcanic ash spewed by numerous area volcanoes that disrupts air transportation.

As of 2017, Indonesia has 61 scheduled and unscheduled commercial airlines. The country is ranked as having the second-fastest growing aviation industry in the world after China in terms of aircraft order and business value. Garuda Indonesia is the flag carrier of Indonesia.

In addition to the airline, Indonesia has Aircraft maintenance, repair, and overhaul (MRO) facilities. GMF AeroAsia has largest aircraft maintenance facility in the world for narrow bodied aircraft. The Indonesian Air Force has 34,930 personnel equipped with 224 aircraft, among them 110 combat aircraft. The Indonesian Air Force possesses and operates numerous military air bases and military airstrips across the archipelago.

The International Air Transport Association (IATA) has predicted that Indonesia will become the world's fourth largest air travel market by 2036. Around 355 million passengers are predicted to fly from and within Indonesia by 2034.

== Air transit policy ==
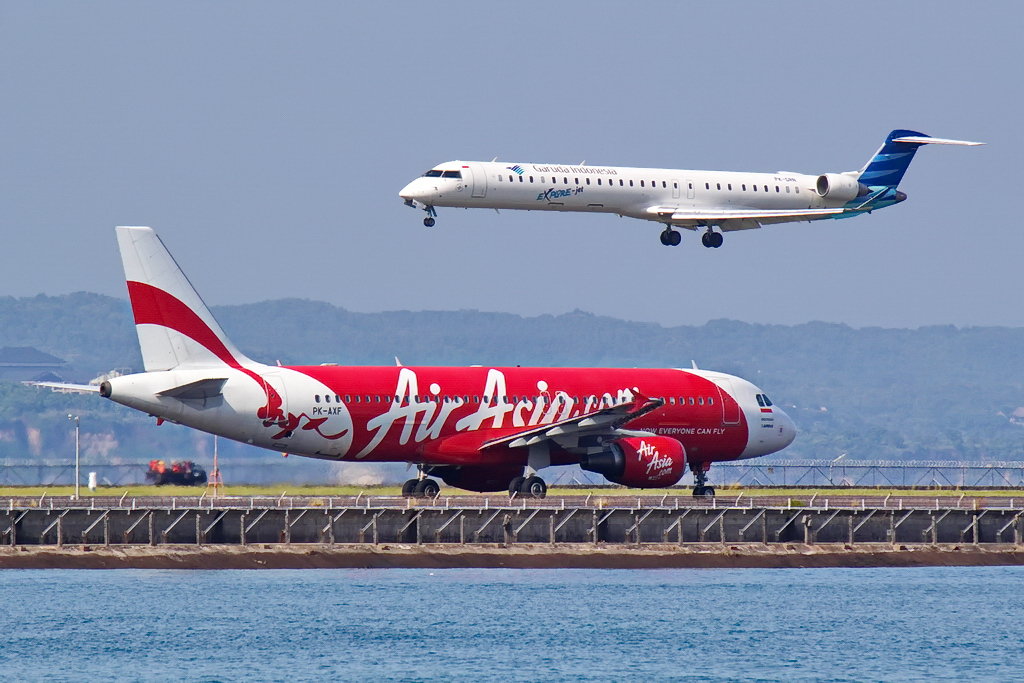
Garuda Indonesia Explore and Indonesia AirAsia airplanes.

As a large country spanning over three time zones, Indonesia possesses a vast airspace. However, Indonesia is not a participant of the International Air Services Transit Agreement (IASTA), therefore both Indonesian airspace and airports are closed for foreign commercial airlines' freedoms of the air, unless there were bilateral transit agreements negotiated with other countries. Indonesia and Australia for example, signed a bilateral agreement relating to air service on 7 February 2013. According to this agreement, each nation grants to the other party the right to fly across its territory without landing, and the right to make stops in its territory for non-traffic purposes (1st and 2nd freedom), and the rights for designated airlines to operate services.

Indonesia is the largest aviation market in the Association of Southeast Asian Nations (ASEAN). However, Indonesia is not yet a full member of the ASEAN open sky agreement, which plans to lift regional flying restrictions throughout Southeast Asia on member country airlines by the end of 2015 or early 2016. Indonesia is considering opening up only five of its international airports under this policy; they are Jakarta, Medan, Bali, Surabaya and Makassar. To date, Indonesia has agreed to open access to Jakarta, yet, Indonesia remains opposed to opening up its secondary cities. Currently Indonesia adopt limitations for foreign airlines to operate in Indonesia. This protectionist stance was meant to protect Indonesian aviation business against competitors, particularly from Singapore and Malaysia. This stance is stemmed from a systematic imbalance between ASEAN nations; as a large nation, Indonesia is able to offer hundreds of access points, while other fellow ASEAN members may offer far less points of access. Singapore for example has only one point of access, while Malaysia may offer two or three access points. This systematic imbalance for exchange of traffic rights has led Indonesian carriers to lobby their government to refrain from entering into multilateral agreement on ASEAN Single Aviation Market.

Access to foreign carriers on domestic routes is disallowed, while international flights will be subject to bilateral agreements. To get around this policy, in order to operate within Indonesia, foreign airlines first have to own and operate an Indonesian-based airline. An example of this practice is Indonesia AirAsia, a branch of Malaysian AirAsia; it previously operated as local airline Awair in 2004, before changed to Indonesia AirAsia in 2005.

== History ==
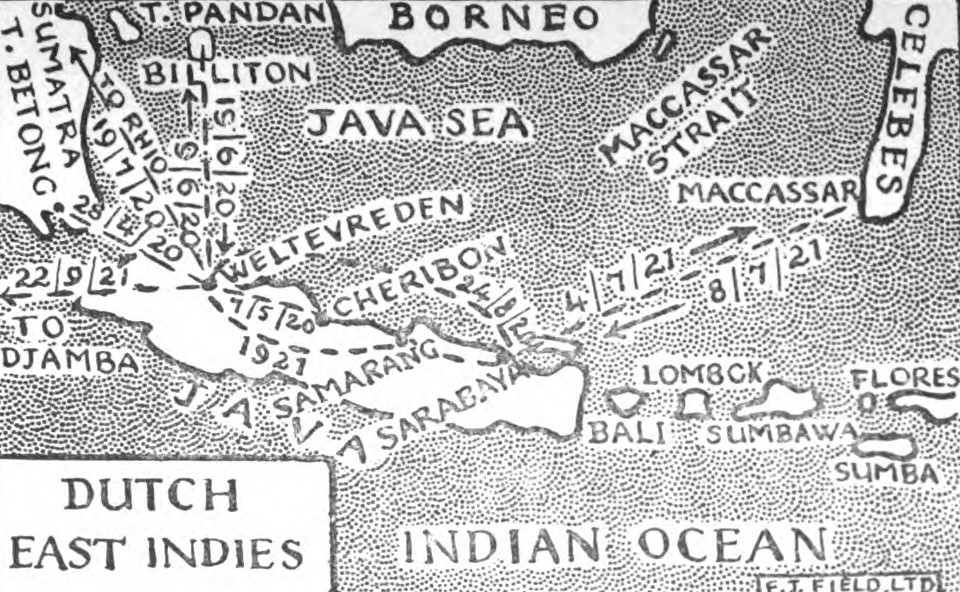
Air routes of the Dutch East Indies in 1925

=== Colonial era ===
Aviation service was pioneered in the early 20th century in colonial Dutch East Indies. On 1 October 1924, KLM started its first intercontinental flight, connecting Amsterdam to Batavia (now Jakarta) in a Fokker F-VII airplane. By September 1929 KLM had started regularly scheduled service between Amsterdam and Batavia. The route connected Amsterdam to Marseille, Rome, Brindisi, Athens, Merza Matruh, Cairo, Gaza, Baghdad, Bushire, Lingeh, Ojask, Gwadar, Karachi, Jodhpur, Allahabad, Calcutta, Akyab, Rangoon, Bangkok, Alor Star, Medan, Palembang, and Batavia, and extended to Bandung. Until the outbreak of the Second World War, this was the world's longest-distance scheduled service.

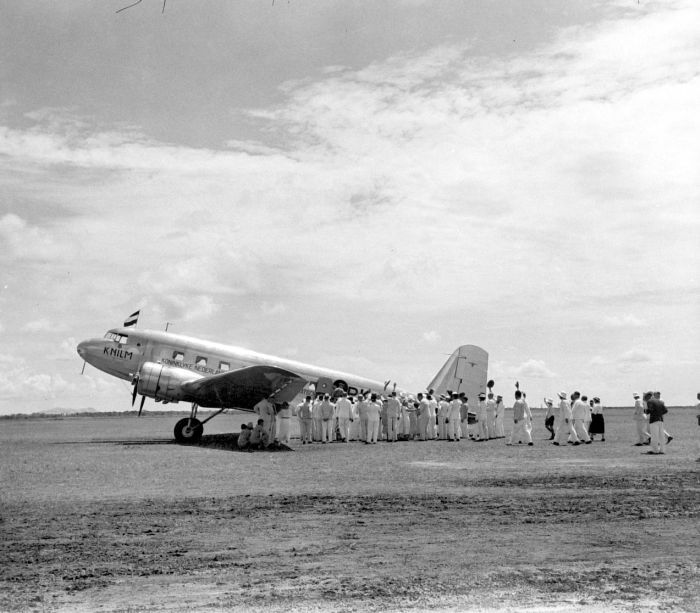
DC-2 at Oelin airport near Banjarmasin in 1935

The Koninklijke Nederlandsch-Indische Luchtvaart Maatschappij (KNILM) — the airline of the former Dutch East Indies — was established on 16 July 1928. Its first regular operations were between Batavia – Bandung, and Batavia – Semarang, starting on 1 November 1928. The inaugural ceremony was held at Cililitan airport in Batavia (now Halim Perdanakusuma International Airport). The Batavia-Semarang flight was later extended to Surabaya. Gradually, the services were expanded to include other islands in the archipelago, namely Palembang and Medan in Sumatra, Balikpapan and Tarakan in Kalimantan, and Denpasar in Bali. Immediately before the Pacific War, KNILM also created a network in the east of the East Indies archipelago, serving towns such as Ambon. For this purpose, amphibious aircraft such as the Sikorsky S-42 and S-43 and the Grumman G-21 seaplanes were used, due to the lack of airstrip facilities in the region.

As early as 1930, KNILM began its first international flight to Singapore. In June 1937, several cities in the Dutch East Indies were visited by Amelia Earhart during her attempted circumnavigation. From Singapore, Earhart flew to Bandung, and Kupang before continuing her journey to Darwin, Australia. On 3 July 1938, KNILM began operations to Sydney, stopping at Darwin, Cloncurry, and Charleville. KNILM did not fly to the Netherlands, as the Amsterdam-Batavia weekly service was operated by KLM.

During the Japanese attack of the Dutch East Indies, KNILM was utilized for evacuation flights and transport of troops. KNILM could not operate in East Indies because of World War II and the ensuing Indonesian war for independence, and disbanded completely on 1 August 1947. Its remaining assets were transferred to KLM, which created the KLM Interinsulair Bedrijf (Interinsular Service).

=== Republic era ===
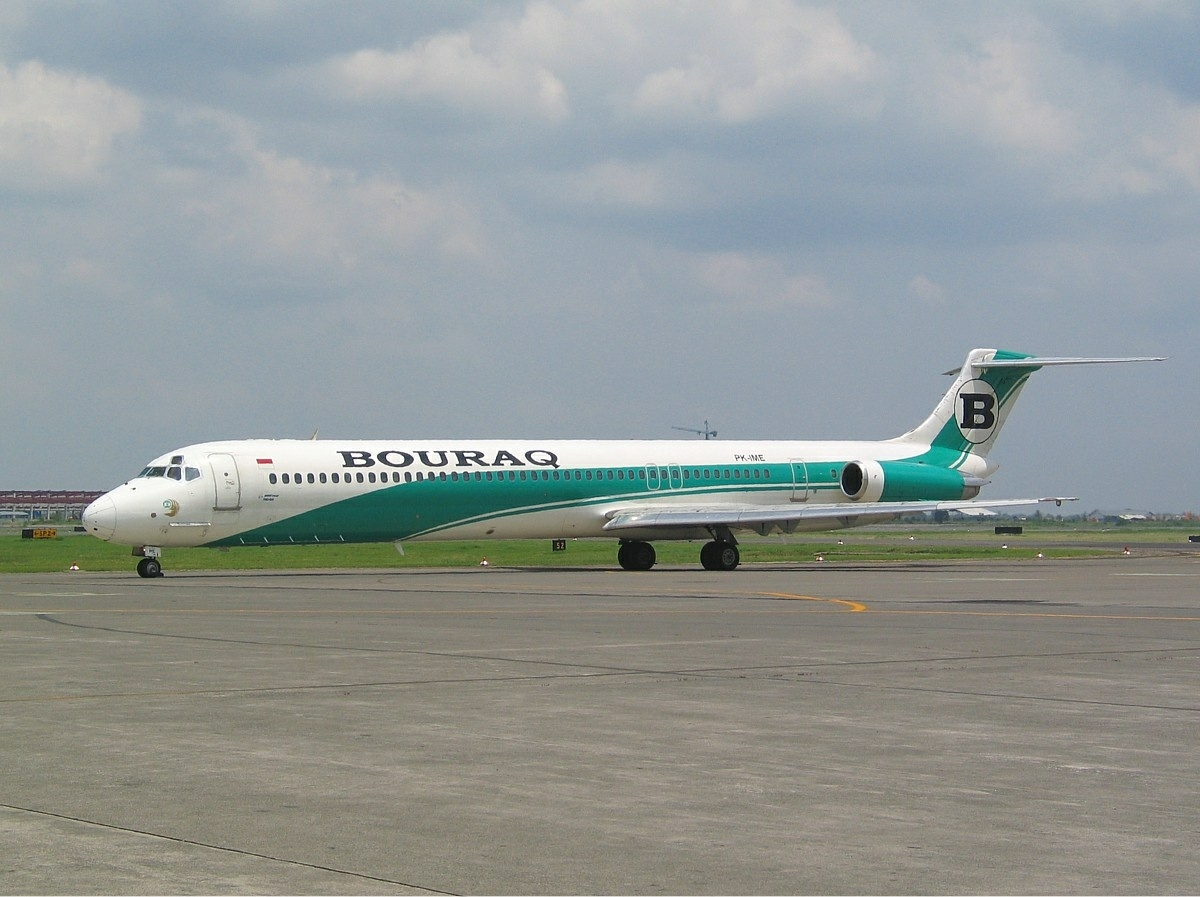
A Bouraq Indonesia Airlines McDonnell Douglas MD-82

The Republic of Indonesia declared its independence on 17 August 1945 and the war of independence ensued. After enduring five years of war and securing recognition of Indonesian Independence in late 1949, the aviation service reopened for business. The KLM Interinsulair Bedrijf was nationalized by the Indonesian government in December 1949 as Garuda Indonesia, the national airline of the republic, and began to operate air services in the Indonesian archipelago.

In the early years of the Indonesian Republic, Garuda Indonesia dominated the air transport service in the country, connecting major cities in the archipelago. In 1956, the Garuda Indonesia operated its first hajj flight to Mecca with Convair aircraft, carrying 40 Indonesian pilgrims. In 1963, the airline launched flights to Hong Kong. By the mid 1960s, the airline took delivery of its first Douglas DC-8 and grew beyond the Asian market, beginning scheduled flights to Amsterdam and Frankfurt via Colombo, Bombay, and Prague. Rome and Paris became the airline's third and fourth European destinations, with flights stopping in Bombay and Cairo to refuel. Flights to the People's Republic of China began that same year, with service to Canton via Phnom Penh.

In 1962, the government-owned Merpati Nusantara Airlines was established to serve penerbangan perintis (pioneer flights) with small aircraft to connect remote locations in the archipelago. The airline however, ceased its operations in February 2014 and subsequently filed for bankruptcy.

In 1969, Indonesia's private aviation service began to grow with the establishment of Mandala Airlines, followed by Bouraq in 1970. These two airlines directly competed against the government-owned Garuda Indonesia and Merpati Nusantara airlines, and survived until the 2000s. The Bouraq ceased its operations in 2005. Mandala was bought by Singapore-based Tigerair Group in 2012, but Tigerair Mandala ceased its operation in 2014.

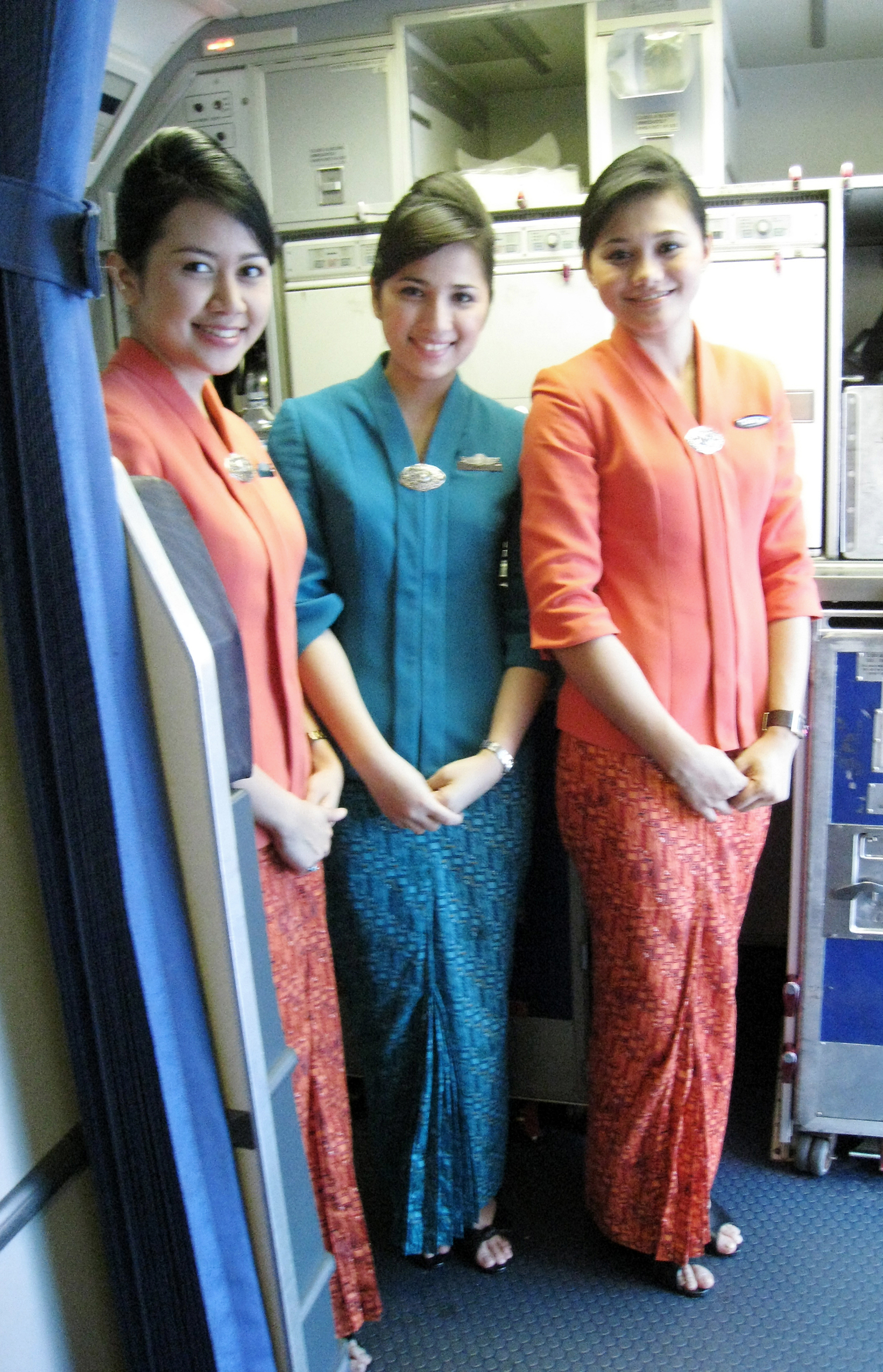
Garuda Indonesia flight attendants in traditional kebaya and kain batik. The aviation industry serves a vital role in Indonesian hospitality and tourism service.

In 2000, the Indonesian government announced the aviation deregulation policy, which makes it easier to acquire a permit to establish a new airline company. The policy was meant to stimulate air transportation investments and increase air-travel business in the country, as well as to serve and stimulate tourism industry in the region. As a result, many new airlines began to spring up in Indonesia, among them Lion Air (est. 1999), Sriwijaya Air (est. 2003), Adam Air (operating from 2002 to 2008), and Batavia Air (operating from 2002 to 2013). The deregulation also spurred the low-cost carrier service in Indonesia. Previously, air travel service was dominated by well-established airlines such as Garuda Indonesia and Merpati.

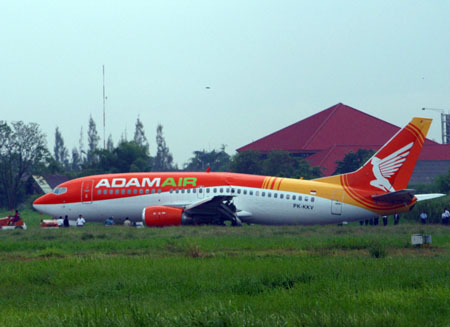
Adam Air Flight 172.

Due to poor government control and supervision, however, aviation service deregulation provoked price wars among low-cost carriers, resulting in fierce commercial competition at the expense of poor maintenance and service breakdown. Consequently, throughout the 2000s, the number of Indonesian aviation accidents and incidents spiked tremendously. The most notable aviation accidents that occurred during this period were Lion Air Flight 583 in Surakarta (30 November 2004, killing 25) and the Adam Air Flight 574 crash into the Makassar Strait (1 January 2007, killing 107). The aviation safety records in Indonesia continued to plummet in a series of flight accidents, including Garuda Indonesia Flight 421 emergency landing on the Bengawan Solo River (16 January 2002, killing 1 stewardess), and Garuda Indonesia Flight 200 in Yogyakarta (7 March 2007, killing 21).

In June 2007, the European Union banned Garuda Indonesia, along with all other Indonesian airlines, from flying into any European country due to poor safety records. The ban on Garuda Indonesia was lifted in July 2009.

By the 2010s, the condition of Indonesian aviation began to improve compared to the previous decade. The air travel incident rate in 2010 also dropped by 40% compared to 2009.

The most significant current problems in Indonesian aviation are poor development and maintenance of air transportation infrastructure, especially in remote areas. Other significant problems include overcapacity; the massive surge of air travelers in recent years, prompted by the growth of low-cost carrier passengers, has put intense stress on the aging airport infrastructure in Indonesia.

As of 14 June 2018, EU lifted the ban of Indonesian airliners from flying into European airspace.

On 29 October 2018, Lion Air Flight 610, a Boeing 737 MAX 8, crashed in the Java Sea 12 minutes after takeoff from Jakarta, killing all 189 people on board. Investigation revealed the design issues in the types' Maneuvering Characteristics Augmentation System (MCAS) was a crucial issue involved in this accident, and later helped trigger a worldwide grounding of all MAX aircraft.

== Airports ==
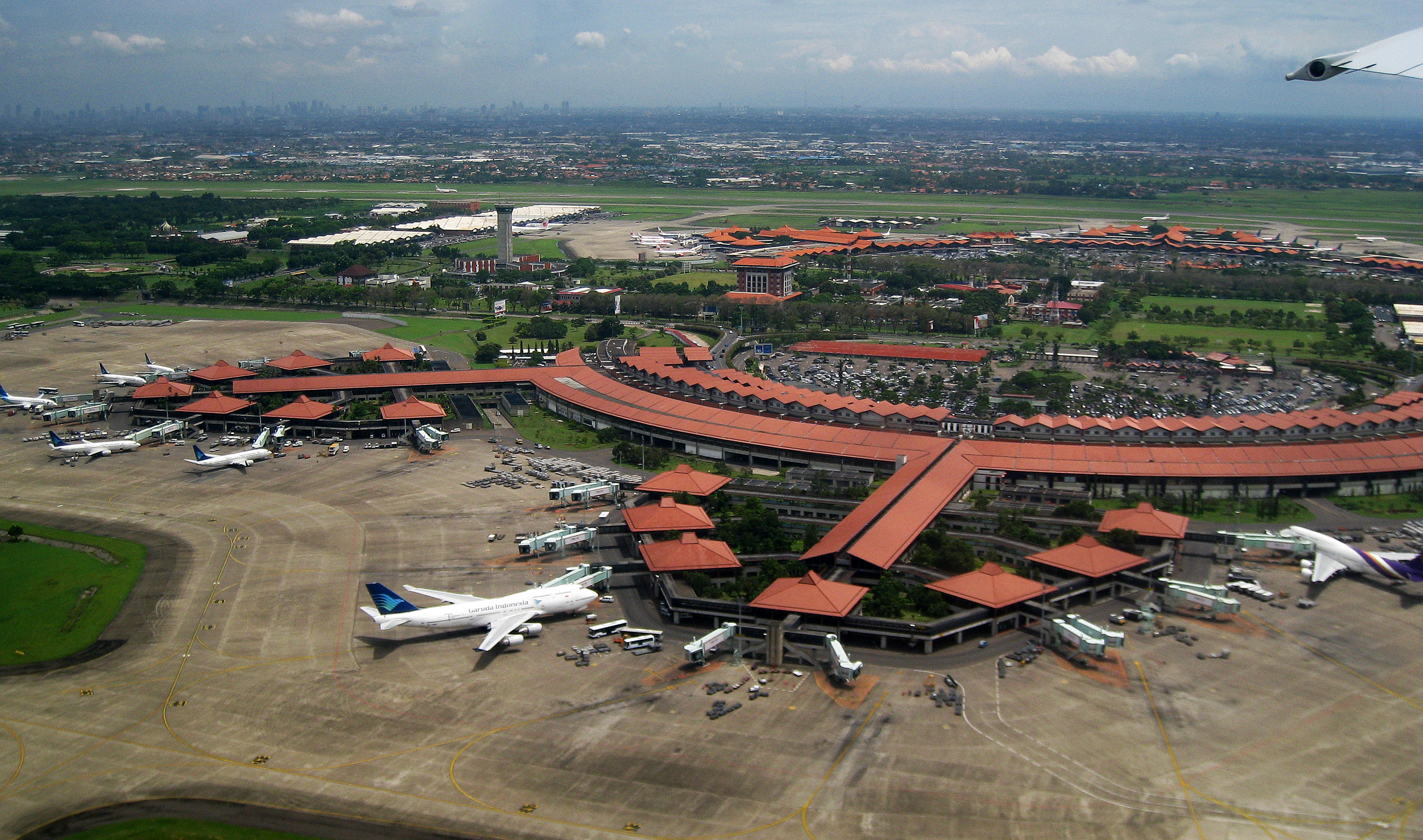
Soekarno–Hatta International Airport, the busiest in Indonesia and Southeast Asia

As of 2013, there are 673 airports in Indonesia, ranging from grand international airports to modest unpaved airstrips on remote islands or inland interior areas located throughout the archipelago. In November 2011, Indonesia had more than 230 conventional airports, most of them operated by Transportation Ministry technical operation units and state-owned PT Angkasa Pura I & II. Major airports are managed by Angkasa Pura; Angkasa Pura I operates 13 airports in Eastern Indonesia, while Angkasa Pura II operates 13 airports in Western Indonesia. After the 2000 aviation deregulation, Indonesian airports endured a surge of passengers, especially catalyzed by the advent of low-cost carriers. According to the Indonesian Transportation Ministry, 9 of the 13 airports managed by PT Angkasa Pura I have exceeded their passenger capacity.

Jakarta's Soekarno–Hatta International Airport serves as the country's main air transportation hub as well as the nation's busiest. Since 2010, it has become the busiest airport in Southeast Asia, surpassing Suvarnabhumi and Changi airports. In May 2014, it became the eighth busiest airport in the world with 62.1 million passengers. It is also the busiest airport in the Southern Hemisphere. In October 2015, the airport is named as Asia's largest megahub, and ranked the 17th most-connected airport in the world.

Next to Soekarno-Hatta, the top five busiest airports in Indonesia which serve as the nation's regional hubs are Juanda (Surabaya), Ngurah Rai (Bali), Sultan Hasanuddin (Makassar), and Kualanamu (Medan).

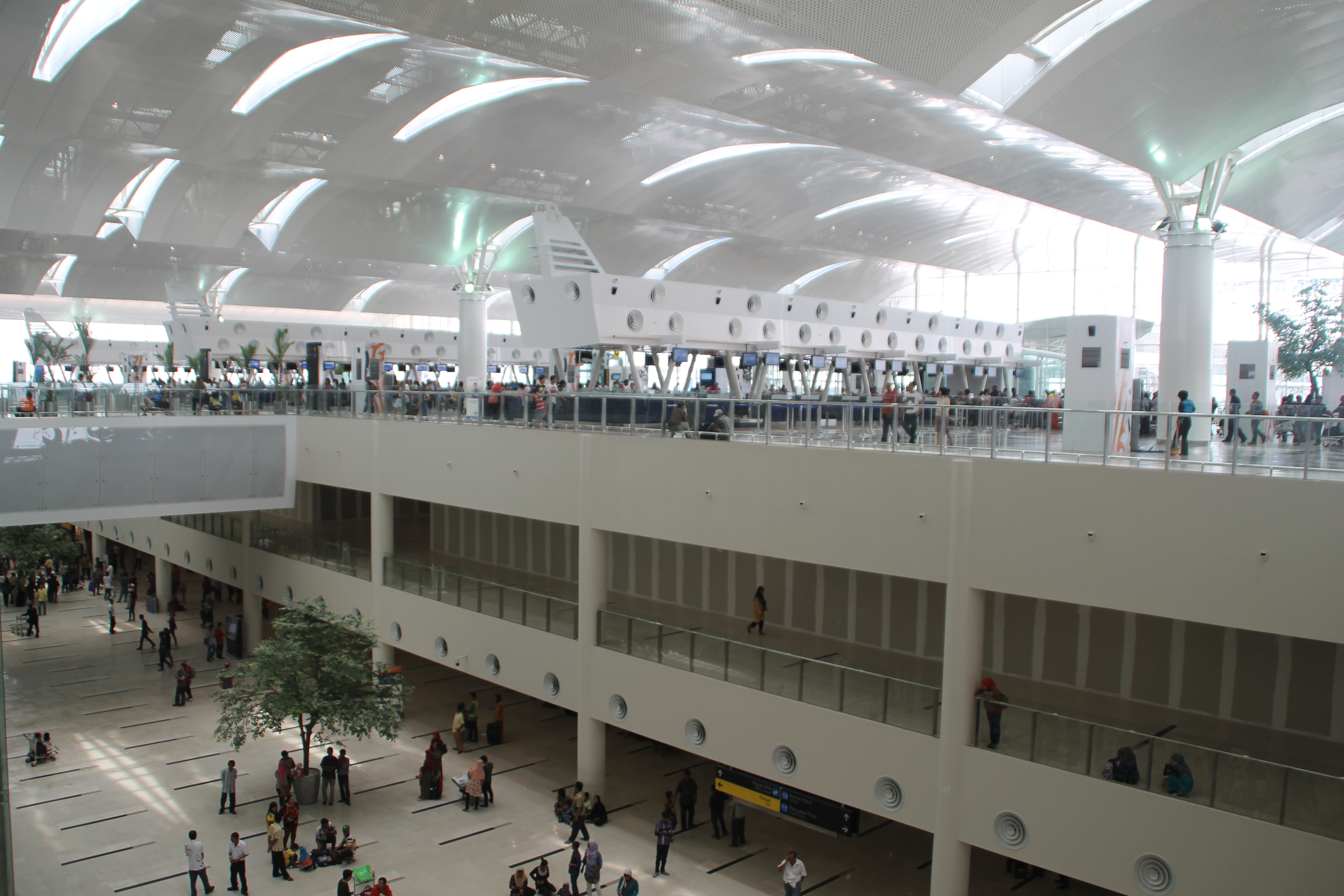
Medan's Kuala Namu departing hall

The surge of air travellers, catalyzed by low-cost carriers and the rise of air-transport demands among Indonesia's rising middle class, has put intense stress on Indonesia's aging airports. Nevertheless, there have been some efforts to improve and upgrade airport facilities, such as the construction of Medan's brand-new Kualanamu International Airport to replace the overwhelmed, aging, and accident-prone Polonia Airport. Other newly built airports include Lombok Airport, replacing the old Selaparang Airport in Lombok; and Minangkabau Airport, replacing the old Tabing Airport in Padang. Existing airports that have undergone massive expansion and upgrades include Ngurah Rai Airport in Bali, Juanda Airport in Surabaya, and Sultan Hasanuddin Airport in Makassar. There are plans to build a second Bali airport in Kubu Tambahan near Singaraja, northern Bali, a new larger airport in Kulon Progo near Yogyakarta to replace the crowded and overwhelmed Adisutjipto Airport, and Kertajati Airport in Kertajati, Majalengka, to replace Bandung's Husein Sastranegara Airport and also to serve the vicinity of Cirebon.

To improve transportation interconnectivity, the government has built railways connecting airports all over Indonesia with nearby city centers. Currently, only 5 of Indonesian airports have a railway connection to the city center, mostly operated by Railink. They are Kuala Namu, Adisutjipto, Soekarno–Hatta Padang and Palembang airports. While airport railways are currently under construction in Surakarta.

Airports – with paved runways

Length	Airports
over 3,047 m	5
2,438 to 3,047 m	21
1,524 to 2,437 m	51
914 to 1,523 m	72
under 914 m	37
Total	186 (2013)

Airports – with unpaved runways

Length	Airports
1,524 to 2,437 m	4
914 to 1,523 m	23
under 914 m	460
Total	487 (2013)

Heliports

	Heliports
Total	76 (2013)

The domestic destinations of Garuda Indonesia, the flag carrier of Indonesia, are primarily major cities in Indonesia. There are also large numbers of smaller airports and airstrips serving towns and remote islands.

== Airlines ==
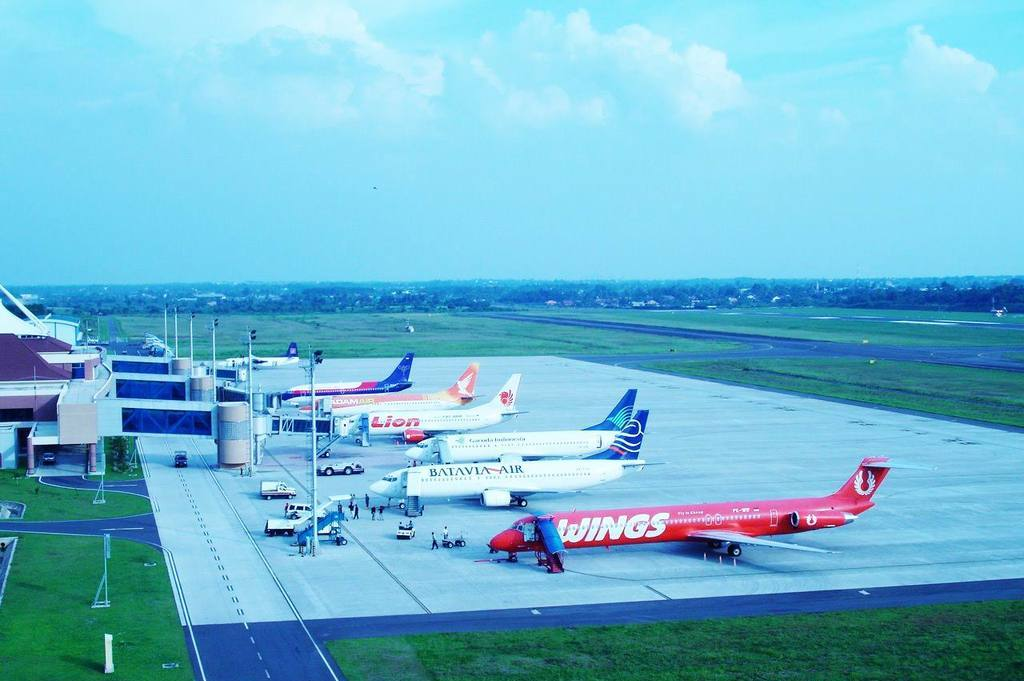
Several Indonesian airlines' airplanes parked on the apron of Sultan Mahmud Badaruddin II International Airport in Palembang

In Indonesia, there are 22 commercial scheduled airlines with flights carrying more than 30 passengers (AOC 121), and 32 airlines that only operate flights with fewer than 30 passengers (AOC 135). Some notable Indonesian airlines, among others, include:

- Garuda Indonesia, the government-owned flag carrier of Indonesia.
- Citilink, the low-cost carrier subsidiary of Garuda Indonesia group.
- Lion Air, currently the largest private low-cost carrier airline in Indonesia.
- Batik Air, the premium subsidiary of Lion Air group.
- Pelita Air, the medium-service airline from Pertamina.
- Wings Air, the regional short-haul subsidiary of Lion Air group, connecting towns and small regional airports.
- Super Air Jet, a low-cost carrier airline, affiliated with Lion Air Group.
- Sriwijaya Air, currently the largest medium service regional carrier in Indonesia, also the country's third largest carrier.
- NAM Air, regional short-haul subsidiary of Sriwijaya Air, also using medium service concept.
- Indonesia AirAsia, the Indonesian branch of Malaysian-based AirAsia.
- Trigana Air, a medium service regional airline serving towns and small regional airports with small aircraft. Mainly serving eastern and central Indonesia.
- TransNusa, a medium service regional airline serving towns and small regional airports with small aircraft. Mainly serving Nusa Tenggara routes.
- Susi Air, regional airline serving towns and small regional airports with small aircraft. Started as a chartered cargo airline carrying fresh seafood from Pangandaran to Jakarta, owned by Susi Pudjiastuti.
Domestic aviation market share in Indonesia (2023)
1. Lion Air Group (64.6%)
2. Garuda Indonesia Group (26.5%)
3. Indonesia AirAsia (3.05%)
4. Sriwijaya Group (2.13%)
5. Pelita Air (2.00%)
6. TransNusa (1.18%)
7. Others (0.53%)

In 2023, Lion Air Group, which comprises Lion Air, Wings Air, and Batik Air, rules Indonesia's domestic air travel market share by 64.60 percent, while Garuda Group, which comprises Garuda Indonesia and Citilink, came in second with 26.52 percent share. Indonesia AirAsia, a unit of the Malaysian budget airline, came in third place with had a 3.05 percent market share.

Overall, Indonesian domestic air travel business in 2023, is still overwhelmingly ruled by two groups; Lion Air group and Garuda Indonesia group. Previously by mid 2015, Lion Air group accounted for 43.17 percent of market share, while Garuda Indonesia group had a 37.08 percent market share.

== Military and government ==
The Indonesian Air Force has 34,930 personnel, equipped with 224 aircraft, among them 110 are combat aircraft. The inventory includes Su-27 and Su-30 as the main fighters supplemented by F-16 Fighting Falcons.

The Indonesian Air Force possess and operate numerous military airbases and military airstrips across the archipelago. The notable ones are Halim Perdana Kusuma Airbase in Jakarta, serving Indonesia's VVIP, where Indonesian Presidential Aircraft stationed. While airforce bases such as Iswahyudi Air Force Base in Madiun, Abdulrachman Saleh in Malang, Sultan Hasanuddin in Makassar, Supadio in Pontianak, and SSK II in Pekanbaru, are especially vital for regional air defense. Since 2014, Indonesian Airforce also had upgraded its military airbase in Ranai, Natuna islands, and increasing its presence in South China Sea region.

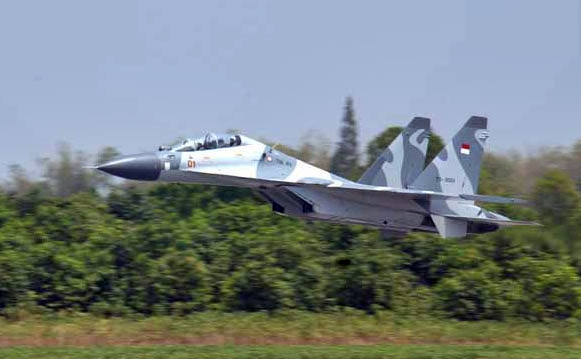
An Indonesian Air Force Su-30 on take off

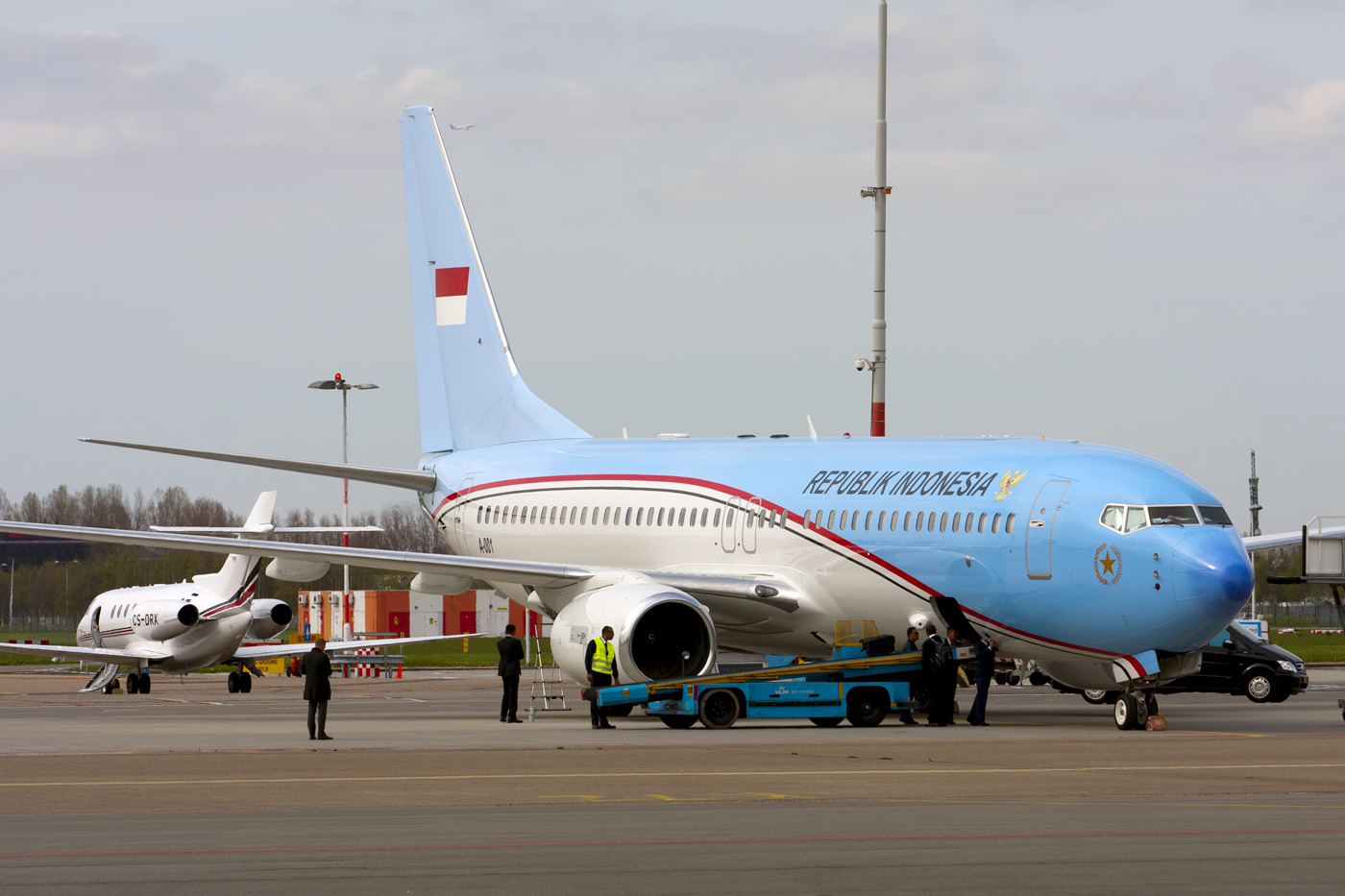
Boeing 737-800 Indonesia One in Amsterdam Airport Schiphol, Netherlands.

== Aircraft industry ==
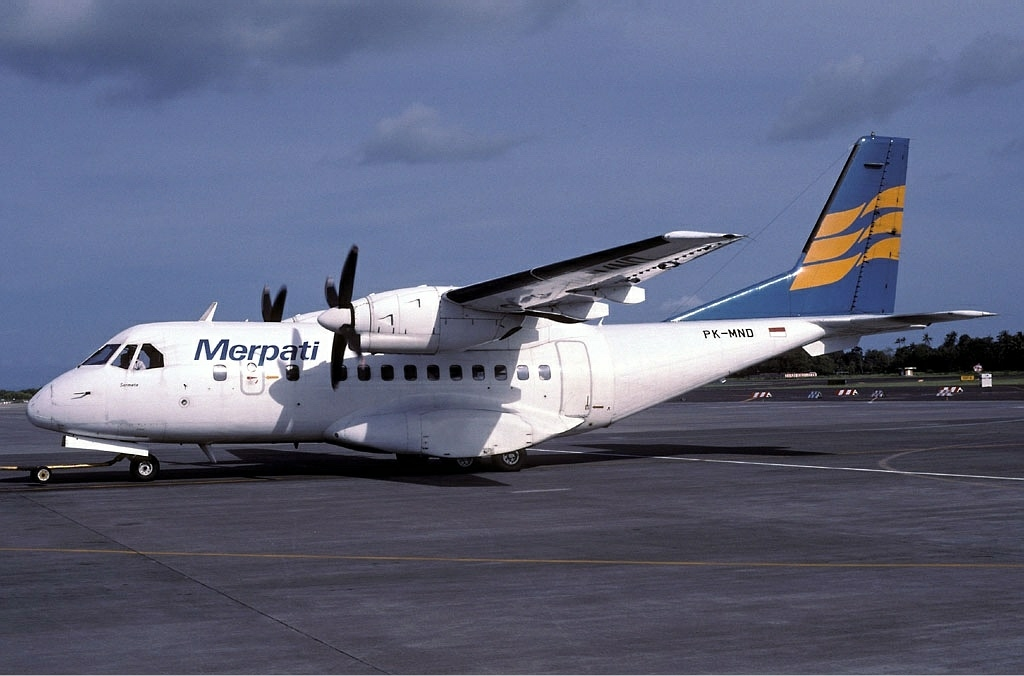
Merpati Nusantara's CN-235.

PT Industri Pesawat Terbang Nurtanio was officially established in Bandung in 1976 as a state-owned aircraft manufacturer company. It was expanded from a research and industrial facility under the auspices of the Indonesian Air Force, namely Lembaga Industri Penerbangan Nurtanio (LIPNUR). Dr. BJ. Habibie was appointed as the President Director, and he has developed the company capability as an aircraft manufacturer.

In 1985 the company's name changed to Industri Pesawat Terbang Nusantara (IPTN). In 2000 the company assumed its new name as Indonesian Aerospace (IAe) (Indonesian: PT Dirgantara Indonesia (DI)). Its notable product is CN-235 civil, military, and maritime version (joint development with CASA Spain).

The Indonesian aircraft manufacture industry took the hardest hit during 1997 Asian financial crisis. Many of its projects, such as N-250 were discontinued for a certain period due to financial constraints. Nevertheless, other projects such as N-219 are being restarted and continued to be developed.

== Incidents and accidents ==
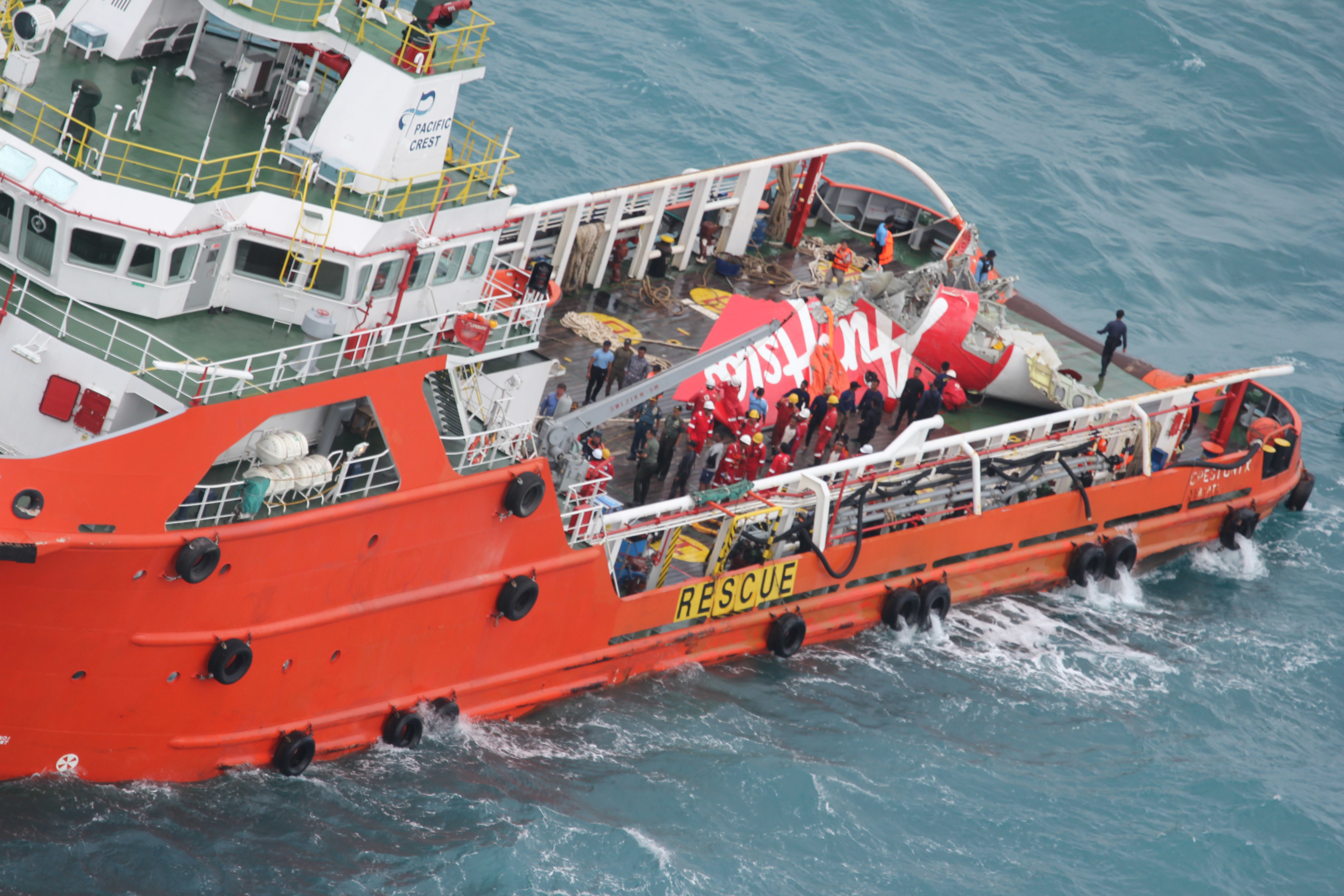
Tail section of Indonesia AirAsia Flight 8501.

== See also ==
- Angkasa Pura
- Civil Aviation Authority of Indonesia
- Directorate General of Civil Aviation (Indonesia)
- Indonesian Aerospace
- Indonesian Air Force
- Indonesian National Board for Disaster Management
- National Transportation Safety Committee
