= Adam Air Flight 574 =

2007 aviation accident in the Makassar Strait

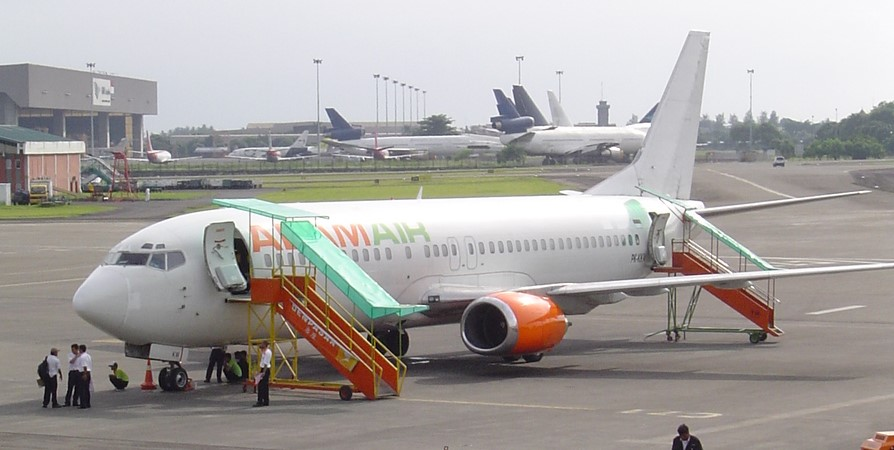
- PK-KKW, the aircraft involved in the accident, seen in 2006

Accident
- Date: 1 January 2007
- Summary: Inertial navigation system malfunction leading to spatial disorientation, pilot error, loss of control, and in-flight breakup
- Site: Makassar Strait off Majene, Sulawesi, Indonesia; 03°40′44″S 118°09′4″E

Aircraft
- Aircraft type: Boeing 737-4Q8
- Operator: Adam Air
- IATA flight No.: KI574
- ICAO flight No.: DHI574
- Call sign: ADAM 574
- Registration: PK-KKW
- Flight origin: Soekarno–Hatta International Airport, Jakarta, Indonesia
- Stopover: Juanda International Airport, Surabaya, East Java, Indonesia
- Destination: Sam Ratulangi International Airport, Manado, North Sulawesi, Indonesia
- Occupants: 102
- Passengers: 96
- Crew: 6
- Fatalities: 102
- Survivors: 0

Adam Air Flight 574 was a scheduled domestic passenger flight operated by an Adam Air Boeing 737-400 between the Indonesian cities of Jakarta, Surabaya, and Manado that crashed into the Makassar Strait near Polewali in Sulawesi on 1 January 2007. All 102 people on board were killed, making it the deadliest aviation accident involving a 737-400. After this, Adam Air faced intense scrutiny by the Indonesian government, which launched a national investigation into the disaster. The government's final report, released on 25 March 2008, concluded that the pilots lost control of the aircraft after they became preoccupied with troubleshooting the inertial navigation system and inadvertently disconnected the autopilot. Despite a series of safety incidents, which contributed to the shutdown of Adam Air in 2008, this was the only incident resulting in fatalities during the airline's 5-year existence.

Together with the subsequent crash of Adam Air Flight 172 and several other transportation accidents, the crash contributed to the United States' downgrading of its safety rating of Indonesian aviation. This eventually led to large-scale transportation safety reforms in Indonesia. All Indonesian airlines were banned from flying into the European Union for several years after the crash. After numerous warnings by the authorities for Adam Air to implement safety regulations went unheeded, the airline was banned from flying by the Indonesian government in March 2008, and declared bankruptcy in June of the same year.

== Background ==
=== Aircraft ===
The aircraft involved was a Boeing 737-4Q8 registered as PK-KKW with the serial number 24070 and line number 1665. The airplane first flew on 11 January 1989. Adam Air acquired the jet on 1 December 2005. Prior to service with Adam Air, the aircraft was owned by International Lease Finance Corporation and has been leased to seven airlines: Dan-Air, British Airways, GB Airways, National Jet Italia, Wells Fargo Bank Northwest (WFBN), Air One, and Jat Airways. The plane was equipped with two CFM56-3C1 engines, had around 50,000 hours flying, and was last evaluated and declared airworthy by the Indonesian transport ministry on 25 December 2005. It was due to be checked again in late January 2007. The Surabaya airport duty manager said that no technical problems with the aircraft were found prior to departure.

=== Pilots ===
In command was 47-year-old Captain Refri Agustian Widodo from Sidoarjo, Indonesia, who joined Adam Air in 2006. His co-pilot was 36-year-old First Officer Yoga Susanto from Magelang, an employee of Adam Air, who also joined the company in 2006. Captain Widodo was a seasoned veteran, having logged more than 13,300 hours of flying time. As pilot-in-command of Boeing 737 aircraft, he had more than 3,800 hours of experience. First Officer Susanto had 4,200 total flying hours and he had almost 1,000 hours logged as a Boeing 737 first officer.

== Flight chronology ==
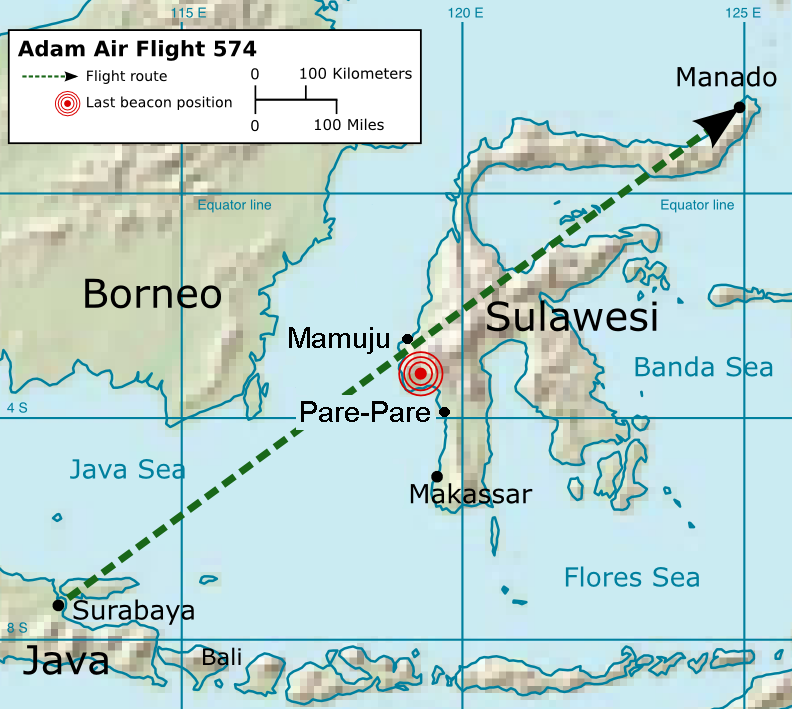
Flight 574's route

On 1 January 2007, at 12:59 local time (05:59 UTC), the plane departed from Juanda Airport, Surabaya, with 96 passengers (85 adults, seven children, and four infants), a 56% load factor, and 6 crew on board. The passenger list was composed mainly of Indonesian nationals with a majority of the passengers returning to Manado after New Year's Day; the foreigners were an American family of three and a German national. The two-hour flight, scheduled to arrive at Sam Ratulangi Airport, Manado, at 16:00 local time, (Note: Cities on Java island, including Surabaya, observe one-hour difference with cities on Sulawesi islands (Western Indonesia Time and Central Indonesia Time, respectively).) was normal until the plane vanished from air traffic control radar screens at Makassar, South Sulawesi, with the final contact at around 15:00 local time. The last known beacon position was detected by a Singaporean satellite. The altitude of the plane was shown as 35,000 feet (10,670 m) on the radar screen.

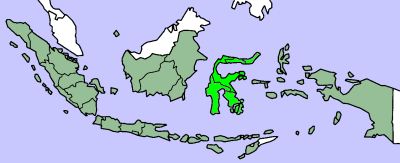
Map showing location of Sulawesi Island (light green) among the islands of Indonesia

Weather in the region was stormy; the Indonesian Bureau of Meteorology and Geophysics noted that the cloud tops were up to 30,000 feet (9,140 m) in altitude with an average wind speed of 30 knots (56 km/h) in the area. Although the Juanda Airport operator, PT Angkasa Pura I, had given the pilot the weather conditions, the plane departed as scheduled. The plane ran into crosswinds of more than 70 knots (130 km/h; 81 mph) over the Makassar Strait, west of Sulawesi, where it changed course eastward toward land before losing contact.

Problems started when the pilots noticed an anomaly in the inertial reference system (IRS). The first officer then attempted to troubleshoot, resetting his IRS unit by switching the knob on his side to Attitude (ATT) mode; this disengaged the autopilot with a 4-second autopilot disconnect tone, effectively requiring the captain to take control and fly the plane straight and level for 30 seconds as the realignment process was completed. Neither crew member noticed the autopilot was no longer engaged, and the captain did not take control. Previous maintenance issues involving the aircraft's ailerons caused the airplane to slowly roll to the right and the nose to drop. When the aircraft reached 35° right bank and increasing, a "bank angle" audible warning sounded in the cockpit.

This accident resulted from a combination of factors, including the failure of the pilots to adequately monitor the flight instruments, particularly during the final 2 minutes of the flight. Preoccupation with a malfunction of the IRS diverted both pilots' attention from the flight instruments and allowed the increasing bank angle and descent to go unnoticed. The pilots did not detect and appropriately arrest the descent soon enough to prevent loss of control.

Captain Widodo told the first officer to switch the IRS mode back to NAV, to hopefully reverse the situation. Now that the first officer's attitude indicator had returned to its normal state, First Officer Susanto could see that the aircraft was in a dangerous position, and attempted to notify the captain. When this failed, he then tried to recover the aircraft from its descent by turning the yoke to the left. Believing that the aircraft was flying straight and level, Captain Widodo then unknowingly reminded First Officer Susanto that the aircraft needed to fly straight and level to complete the IRS alignment process. The aircraft was now in a 100° right bank with a 60 nose-down attitude. First Officer Susanto successfully notified the captain of their situation. In response to the first officer telling him to pull up to stop the rapid descent towards the sea, Captain Widodo pulled back on his yoke, and the aircraft, travelling at Mach 0.926 (92.6% the speed of sound), experienced a force 3.5 times the force of gravity at a calibrated airspeed of 490 knots (well above its maximum speed) and began to break apart in-flight. All recordings stopped at 9,000 feet, presumably because the aircraft had fully broken apart.

No distress signals were sent by the aircraft.

== Victims ==
| Nationality | Passengers | Crew | Total |
|---|---|---|---|
| Germany | 1 | 0 | 1 |
| Indonesia (Note: Including two passengers with Indonesian-Portuguese dual citizenship) | 92 | 6 | 98 |
| United States | 3 | 0 | 3 |
| Total | 96 | 6 | 102 |

There were 98 Indonesian and 3 American citizens on board the flight, along with one German citizen.

== Search and rescue efforts ==
About 3,600 army and police personnel were mobilised in the search for the missing aircraft. One Boeing 737-200 surveillance plane, two infrared-equipped Fokker-50 aircraft from the Republic of Singapore Air Force, a Navy Nomad plane, and six helicopters were dispatched to aid searching for the missing plane from the air. The Indonesian sonar-equipped ship Pulau Rengat, capable of detecting underwater metallic objects, later joined the team, equipped with a remote-controlled minisubmarine. It searched the sea for five days between 3 and 8 January, without success.

Naval ships combed the Makassar Strait while military personnel went through jungles and mountains of Sulawesi. In the face of heavy rain and strong winds in the area, the search efforts, coordinated from Makassar city, were focused in the area between the coastal town of Majene and the mountainous region of Toraja. The search in the two areas was due to two signals, each carrying different emergency locator transmitter frequencies, received by a Singaporean satellite and an Indonesian military air base. The two separate locations produced on radar screens were a spot on the sea in Majene and on land in Rantepao, Tana Toraja. (Note: An aeroplane has two emergency position-indicating radio beacons (ELTs): one, a portable unit, located in the cockpit, emits on 121.5 MHz and is activated by the plane ditching at sea; the other, a fixed ELT near the tail, emits on 406 MHz and is activated by a crash landing.) Searches were then expanded throughout the Island of Sulawesi; some were triggered by unknown distress signals received by a commercial Lion Air flight and an airport. A police officer at the Barru district police operational centre said that all the districts with stretches of coastline along the Makasser Strait had teams searching for the plane.

The head of the National Search and Rescue Agency told the Associated Press that he believed the aircraft was probably lost at sea. From 5 January 2007, the main focus of the search was relocated to areas south of Manado, after Manado's Sam Ratulangi Airport reported detecting a signal from the plane a day before. The rugged terrain coupled with thick and low-hanging clouds continued to hamper the search efforts, and three relatives of missing passengers who overflew part of the area on a military reconnaissance plane admitted that the chances of finding the plane were slim. Officials said that any bodies remaining in one piece was unlikely. On 14 January, at Indonesia's request, Singapore lent four towed underwater locator beacon detectors, sometimes called towed-pinger locators (TPLs), and six consultants to aid in the search. One week later, one of these TPLs, operated from the USNS Mary Sears, successfully located the black boxes. On 24 January, the British ship MN ''Endeavour'' joined the search for wreckage. The ship was operated by local mining firm PT Gema Tera Mustikawati and is usually used by oil- and gas-drilling companies to map the seabed. By then, the Indonesian government had spent an average of Rp 1 billion (about US$110,000) a day on the search.

On 10 February, search operations were officially halted by the Search and Rescue Agency, according to Transportation Minister Hatta Rajasa, finalising the legal status of both the plane and its passengers and crew. This announcement allowed the families of the victims to start the insurance claims process.

== Discovery of wreckage ==
Locations on topographical map of Sulawesi
= black boxes = international airports
= related cities

=== Unidentified submerged objects ===
On Monday, 8 January, three large metal objects, suspected to be wreckage, were detected by the Indonesian ship KRI Fatahillah's sonar. First Admiral Gatot Subyanto of the Indonesian Navy indicated three locations, between 3 and 6 km (1.9 and 3.7 mi; 1.6 and 3.2 nmi) apart, off Mamuju city on Sulawesi's western coast. Due to limitations of the navy's sonar equipment, what the metal was remained unclear, and Indonesia had no other equipment of its own. A United States Navy oceanographic survey ship, Mary Sears, arrived in the area on 9 January with better equipment to help identify the objects, and on the same date, a Canadian jet with five separate air crews, working in shifts, was sent to aid with aerial mapping of the suspected location. The Indonesian Marine and Fishery Department has since suggested that the metal objects instead could have been instruments deployed to study the underwater sea current. A total of 12 Indonesian Navy ships was deployed in the area, including the KRI Ajak, KRI Leuser, and KRI Nala. Extra underwater equipment, including a metal detector and an undersea camera, was sent from the United States, and arrived aboard the USNS Mary Sears on 17 January. The flight recorders were subsequently located elsewhere, in the waters in an area known as Majene, and a wide, sweeping search of the area revealed high amounts of scattered debris there, too. This debris was analysed to confirm it belonged to the 737.

=== Floating debris ===
The aircraft's right horizontal stabiliser was found by a fisherman, south of Pare Pare, about 300 m (980 ft) off the beach on 11 January, although it was not originally handed in, as its discoverer thought it to be a piece of plywood, only later realising it was a piece of the tail. This was confirmed by the part number on the stabiliser, 65C25746-76, which matched that of components on the missing 737. The fisherman received a reward of 50 million rupiah (equivalent to about $5,500) for his discovery. Later, other parts of the aircraft, including passenger seats, life jackets, a food tray, part of an aircraft tire, eight pieces of aluminium and fibre, an ID card, a flare, and a headrest were also recovered from the area. By 13 January, a piece of a wing was also recovered. Whether the 1.5-metre-long (4 ft 11 in) section was a section of the right wing or the left wing was unclear, although it was examined in an attempt to discover this. The total count of recovered objects associated with aircraft, as of 29 January, was 206, of which 194 were definitely from the 737. Pieces of clothing thought to belong to passengers were also recovered, and on 15 January, pieces of human hair and what is thought to be human scalp were recovered from a headrest that had been pulled from the sea. They were DNA tested to attempt to identify them, but the results of this testing are unknown.

=== Cockpit voice recorder and flight data recorder ===
On 21 January 2007, the flight data recorder (FDR) and cockpit voice recorder (CVR) were located 42 nautical miles off the coast of West Sulawesi] by USNS Mary Sears (T-AGS-65). The FDR was located at 03°41′02″S 118°08′53″E at a depth of 2,000 m (6,600 ft), while the CVR was located at 03°40′22″S 118°09′16″E at a depth of 1,900 m (6,200 ft), approximately 1.4 km (0.87 mi; 0.76 nmi) apart. Indonesian vessel Fatahillah travelled to the location. The Mary Sears used her side scan sonar unit to map an area about 10.3 km^{2} (3 sq nmi) around the recorders in high resolution, an operation that required 18 passes across the area at roughly 3 kn (6 km/h; 3 mph), taking six hours per pass, including lining up for the next pass. It discovered a large amount of wreckage in the area, which was considered to be all that remained of the aircraft. A senior Indonesian marine official said on 24 January that he did not believe that the equipment required to retrieve the boxes from that depth was available in any Asian country. The recorders had a battery life of just 30 days, and would subsequently be unable to emit locator signals.

On 3 February, Indonesian naval vessel KRI Tanjung Dalpele took affected families out to the crash site, where a memorial service was held, which included throwing flowers into the sea.

== Salvage ==
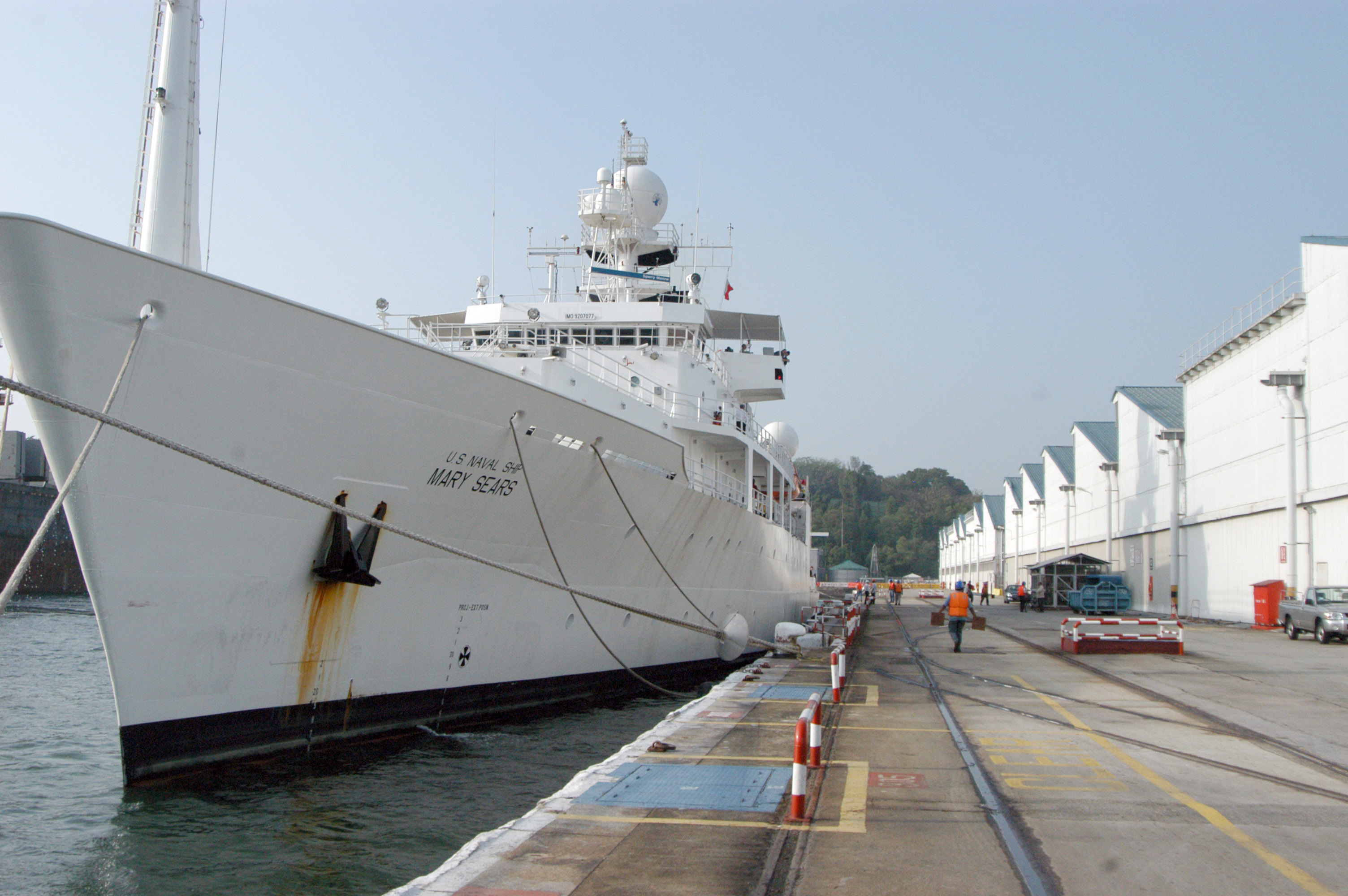
US Navy Mary Sears moored in Singapore after mapping the aircraft crash site in Sulawesi

On 26 January 2007, a dispute arose between Adam Air and the Indonesian government regarding the retrieval of the recorders. Due to the depth involved, recovery required an underwater remotely operated vehicle, but Indonesia did not have such equipment. Vice-president of Indonesia Jusuf Kalla went so far as to question the need to retrieve the black boxes at all, although experts said in response that the accident was of international significance, as it could indicate a fault with the aircraft. Adam Air said that in its opinion, the recorders should be recovered, describing the accident as being relevant on both national and international levels, but refused to pay, saying that was the responsibility of the government. Indonesia did request technical assistance from the United States, Japan, and France. Jim Hall, a former chairman of the US National Transportation Safety Board, said that recovering them quickly was essential, as at that point, their 30-day battery life was about to expire, which subsequently did happen. He cited problems such as poor visibility and strong currents making recovery of the devices difficult without the signal.

On 31 January, the US reportedly had to withdraw the vessel Mary Sears from the searches, the US military saying that the vessel had other duties. Further funding and help from the US would have to be approved by the United States Congress. At the same time, external companies were suggested as possible retrievers of the recorders. Indonesia continued to seek help from other countries, such as France and Japan. Indonesia's National Transportation Safety Committee head Setio Rahardjo maintained that Adam Air should be charged with the retrieval costs.

Originally, Indonesia confirmed it would not be able to pay for the salvage operation, and neither could they force Adam Air to do so. Nonetheless, Adam Air signed a contract with Phoenix International for the recovery operation. On 23 August, the Eas arrived in Sulawesi's Makassar port to begin salvage operations, which began with several days survey. The vessel was carrying a minisubmarine that could dive down to 6,000 m (20,000 ft) and was equipped with sonar and deep-sea cameras.

A Phoenix International underwater robot scouring the sea off Majene on Sulawesi finally retrieved the FDR on 27 August and CVR on 28 August. The two devices were found at a depth around 2,000 m (6,600 ft) and were 1,400 m (4,600 ft) apart. They had moved 10–15 m (33–49 ft) from their original locations by underwater currents. The black boxes were sent to Washington, D.C. for analysis. The final cost of the salvage operation to retrieve the recorders was US$3 million, of which $2 million were contributed by the Indonesian government, with Adam Air paying the rest. Efforts continued with the hope of recovering various large pieces of wreckage from the seabed.

== Investigation ==
President Susilo Bambang Yudhoyono ordered a full investigation to discover the cause of the aircraft's disappearance, including the cause of the accident, before the main debris field had even been found. The investigation also looked at the airworthiness of the plane and standard procedure on aircraft operations. A team from the United States with representatives from the National Transportation Safety Board, the Federal Aviation Administration, Boeing, and General Electric was sent to Indonesia to assist the Indonesian National Committee for Transportation in the investigation. A wider investigation into Indonesia's transport system as a whole was planned. Eyewitnesses reported seeing a low-flying, unstable aircraft in the area from which the wreckage has been recovered, but lost sight of it after hearing a loud bang. The chief of the Indonesian Aircraft Technicians Association, Wahyu Supriantono, said that the plane was unlikely to have suffered an in-flight break up or explosion, as the debris field would have been larger, and as a result, wreckage would have been discovered earlier. The flight recorders were recovered in August 2007, without which discovery of the cause of the accident would not have been possible. The National Transportation Safety Committee (NTSC, or KNKT as per its Indonesian name) described the near eight-month wait for the recovery of the flight recorders as "unacceptable".

On 25 March 2008, the inquiry ruled that pilot error and a faulty navigation device were to blame. While cruising at 35,000 ft (11,000 m), the pilots became preoccupied with troubleshooting the aircraft's two inertial reference systems (IRS), part of the navigation system. As they were correcting the problem, the autopilot was disengaged and they failed to correct for a slow right roll even after a "bank angle" alarm sounded. By the time the pilots noticed the situation, the bank angle had reached 100° with almost 60° nose-down attitude. Contrary to the correct recovery procedure, the pilots did not level the wings before trying to regain pitch control. The aircraft reached 490 knots (910 km/h; 560 mph) at the end of the recording, in excess of the aircraft's maximum operating speed of (400 kn (740 km/h; 460 mph)). The descent rate varied during the fatal dive, with a maximum recorded value of 53,760 ft/min (273 m/s). The tailplane suffered a structural failure 20 seconds prior to the end of the recording, when the investigators concluded the aircraft was in a "critically unrecoverable state". Both flight recorders ceased to function when the 737 broke up in midair at 9,000 ft (2,700 m) above sea level.

The NTSC determined:

1. Flight crew coordination was less than effective, as the pilot-in-command did not manage task sharing and crew resource management practices were not followed.
2. The crew focused their attention on troubleshooting the IRS failure and neither pilot was flying the aircraft.
3. After the autopilot disengaged and the aircraft exceeded 30° right bank, the pilots appeared to have become spatially disoriented.
4. The Adam Air syllabus of pilot training did not cover complete or partial IRS failure.
5. The pilots had not received training in aircraft upset recovery, including spatial disorientation.

=== Maintenance concerns ===
Investigators quickly became concerned about apparent poor maintenance and believed it might have been an important factor in the accident.

==== Adam Air ====
Adam Air's safety record, like many of other Indonesian airlines at the time, has been heavily criticized. Adam Air has reportedly heavily pressured pilots to fly planes they knew were unsafe. Pilots have reported repeated and deliberate breaches of international safety regulations, and aircraft being flown in nonairworthy states (including one aircraft flying with a damaged door handle and another with a damaged window) for months. Other incidents include pilots being ordered to fly aircraft even after exceeding the take-off limit of five times per pilot per day, using spare parts from other planes to keep planes in the air, and ignoring requests not to take off due to unsafe aircraft. According to the Associated Press, one ex-Adam Air pilot stated, "every time you flew, you had to fight with the ground staff and the management about all the regulations you had to violate." Pilots also claimed that if they confronted their seniors, they were grounded or docked pay.

Founder Adam Adhitya Suherman had personally denied the accusations, stating that maintenance had made up "40% of our total operational costs".

==== Specific aircraft ====
Investigators discovered that the aircraft was the subject of a large number of maintenance discrepancies filed by pilots (called "write-ups" in the aviation industry). The highest number of complaints concerned the captain's side vertical speed indicator, which informs the air crew of the rate — in feet per minute at which the aircraft is ascending or descending. In all, 48 complaints were made regarding the instrument in the three months before the crash. The aircraft's IRS, which informs pilots of their position, orientation, and velocity, was complained about a total of 30 times. The International Herald Tribune reported that this may be of particular significance. The third-most-complained about instrument was a fuel differential light, which received 15 write-ups. Numerous complaints were also received about inoperative cockpit instrument lights, as well as multiple other malfunctions. Several complaints were made that the flaps, which modify drag and lift during take-off and landing, were jamming at 25° upon landing, and two complaints were made that the weather radar was faulty.

== Legal action ==
Adam Air was sued by Indonesian consumer and labour groups over the accident, for a total of one trillion rupiahs (US$100 million), to be paid to the families of the victims. According to a lawyer for the families, speaking in a press conference along with the secretary for the Adam Air KI-574 Passengers' Families Association (formed in the aftermath of the disaster), 30 of the victims' families intend to sue Boeing instead of Adam Air over the accident. This does not necessarily mean that all of the others will sue Adam Air, however, as they may not necessarily exercise their right to sue at all. Representatives of the families have explained that they believe the plane was brought down by a faulty rudder control valve, similar to the accidents involving United Airlines Flight 585 and USAir Flight 427, which went down in the early 1990s, although no evidence proves this. They have explained that as a result, they are suing Boeing and Parker Hannifin, the valve's manufacturer, although airlines using the 737-300, -400, and -500 have been warned about problems with the rudder control valves.

== Reaction ==
=== Government ===
Vice president Jusuf Kalla described the disappearance as an "international issue." A few days after the disappearance, President Susilo Bambang Yudhoyono set up the National Team for Transportation Safety and Security, partially as a response to the high number of recent transportation accidents in Indonesia, and partially as a direct response to the event. The team was tasked to evaluate thoroughly the transport safety procedures and review the existing regulations on transportation. It was not, however, to investigate accidents; the entity deemed responsible for this was the Komisi Nasional Keselamatan Transportasi (KNKT), or in English the National Transportation Safety Commission (NTSC), which is part of Departemen Perhubungan (Ministry of Transportation).

=== Adam Air ===
Adam Air was accused by multiple organisations of poor maintenance and ordering pilots to fly in all weather and regardless of aircraft conditions. Adam Adhitya Suherman, founder of the family-run airline, has personally denied these accusations, and has said that maintenance consumes "up to 40% of our total operational costs". Adam Air has compensated the families of deceased passengers Rp 500 million (equivalent to about US$55,000 or €42,000) per passenger. It also compensated families of the flight crew.

Calls from relatives of the dead were made for Adam Air to build a memorial to the victims in Makassar, South Sulawesi. Adam Air said that if an agreement could be reached, then they would fulfill the request.

== Aftermath ==
This accident weakened Adam Air's image, which at the time was already negative among the public because of their frequent breakdowns and delays. The crash also exacerbated financial difficulties at the airline, which ceased operations a few years later.

The Indonesian government announced plans immediately after the accident to ban jets over 10 years old for any commercial purpose. Previously, the age limit was 35 years. Although this was in response to a large number of aircraft accidents, it was mainly in response to this accident and the Flight 172 incident. Indonesia also announced that the Transportation Ministry would be reshuffled in response to this accident and the loss of the ferries MV Senopati Nusantara and Levina 1. Among those replaced were the directors of air and sea transports and the chairman of the National Committee for Transportation Safety. Indonesia also introduced a new system of ranking airlines according to their safety record, with a level-one ranking meaning the airline has no serious issues, a level-two ranking meaning the airline must fix problems, and a level-three ranking meaning that the airline may be forced to shut down.

In March 2007, the Indonesian government announced that Adam Air was one of 15 airlines that would have their licences revoked and scrutinized within three months unless they could improve their safety standards. The other airlines included Batavia Air, Jatayu Airlines, Kartika Airlines, Manunggal Air Services, Transwisata Prima Aviation, and Tri-MG Intra Asia Airlines. These airlines were all targeted as a direct result of the crash, as they were in the third level of the ranking system introduced as a result. All Indonesian airlines, including state-owned Garuda Indonesia, were told they would need to make some improvements, with none of them receiving a level-one ranking.

A report on 28 June 2007 indicated that Adam Air would escape closure and had been upgraded one rank in safety rating, to the middle tier. The airlines that lost their licences were Jatayu Gelang Sejahtera, Aviasi Upataraksa, Alfa Trans Dirgantara, and Prodexim. Additionally, Germania Trisila Air, Atlas Delta Setia, Survey Udara Penas, Kura-Kura Aviation, and Sabang Merauke Raya Air Charter were grounded pending improvements and facing potential licence revocation.

On 16 April 2007, the American Federal Aviation Administration responded to the results of the new airline survey by downgrading Indonesia's air safety oversight category from a 1 to a 2 because of "serious concerns" over safety. This means it views Indonesia's civil aviation authority as failing to oversee air carriers in accordance with minimum international standards. As a direct result, the US Embassy in Jakarta issued a warning to all American citizens flying in or out of Indonesia to avoid using Indonesian airlines, and instead use international carriers with better safety reputations. This was followed on 28 June 2007 by the addition of all Indonesia's airlines, none of which flew to Europe at the time, to the list of airlines banned in the European Union; the ban was lifted for flag carrier Garuda Indonesia and three smaller airlines in 2009, and by 2018 all Indonesian airlines were once again permitted to fly to the EU. Budhi Mulyawan Suyitno, Director-general of civil aviation at the Indonesian transport ministry, responded by saying that he felt Indonesia had made the improvements required by the EU. A blanket ban on all Indonesian airlines flying to the United States was imposed in 2007, and lifted in 2016.

On 18 March 2008, shortly after a further accident in Batam, the airline's Air Operator's Certificate was suspended by the Indonesian government. Three months later, the air certificate was revoked, and the airline ceased operations and filed for bankruptcy.

After the airline was banned from flying by the government, one of its founders, Sandra Ang, was arrested by police after she was suspected of embezzling the company's money.

=== Flight 172 ===
On 21 February 2007, just 51 days after the loss of Flight 574, Flight 172, an Adam Air Boeing 737-300 aircraft (registration PK-KKV) flying from Jakarta to Surabaya had a hard landing at Juanda International Airport. The incident caused the fuselage of the plane to crack and bend in the middle, with the tail of the plane drooping towards the ground. No serious injuries from the incident were reported. As a result, six Adam Air 737s were grounded awaiting safety checks. Adam Air described this as "harsh punishment" for an accident it blamed on poor weather conditions, but Vice-president Kalla had said that all Boeing 737-300s should be checked.

=== Alleged cockpit voice recording leakage ===
The alleged recording

In early August 2008, a digital recording allegedly retrieved from the plane's CVR was widely circulated on the Internet and transcribed by the media. The recording, which had been publicly distributed through chain e-mails, begins with what is believed by some to be a conversation between Captain Refi Agustian Widodo and First Officer Yoga Susanto before the crash. About two minutes before the end of the recording, the autopilot disconnect horn can be heard to sound, followed roughly a minute later by "bank angle" warnings and the altitude alert. Immediately thereafter, as the aircraft begins its final dive, the shotgun-like sounds of engine compressor surges and the overspeed "clacker" can be heard, along with two background voices screaming in terror and shouting out Allahu Akbar. Towards the end of the recording, a dramatic increase in wind noise occurs, as well as two loud bangs, the second greater than the first, consistent with structural failure of the aircraft. This is followed 20 seconds later by abrupt silence. When the pilots regained visual ground contact, most likely they quickly pulled up, overloading the horizontal stabiliser downwards and a main wing spar upwards. This recording was dismissed by officials, who said that it was not authentic and was not the original recording.

== In popular culture ==
The crash was featured in the seventh episode of season seven of the documentary series Mayday, also known as Air Disasters ("Lost", season 7, episode 7, first broadcast 16 December 2009) and Air Crash Investigation, titled "Flight 574: Lost".

== See also ==
- Aviation safety
- AirAsia Indonesia Flight 8501
- List of accidents and incidents involving commercial aircraft
- List of aircraft accidents and incidents resulting in at least 50 fatalities
- List of accidents and incidents involving airliners by airline (A–C)
- MV Senopati Nusantara, which sank during the same storm
- West Air Sweden Flight 294
- Korean Air Flight 8509
- Copa Airlines Flight 201
- Air India Flight 855 crashed into the Arabian Sea after takeoff from Mumbai.
- Birgenair Flight 301
- K2 Airways Flight 1732, another 737-400 with a malfunctioning navigation system that crashed into the Arabian Sea
