= National Team for Transportation Safety and Security =

Government agency of Indonesia

The National Team for Transportation Safety and Security was set up a few days after the disappearance of Adam Air Flight 574 on 1 January 2007, by President Susilo Bambang Yudhoyono, partially as a response to the high number of recent transportational accidents in Indonesia, and also as a direct response to the loss of the aircraft, along with other civil aviation accidents within Indonesia. The team is tasked to evaluate thoroughly the transport safety procedures and review the existing regulations on transportation in Indonesia. It does not, however, investigate accidents; the entity responsible for this is the National Transportation Safety Committee (Indonesian:Komite Nasional Keselamatan Transportasi), which operates under the direct auspicies of the Transportation Ministry.
