= KRI Leuser =

Indonesian naval vessel

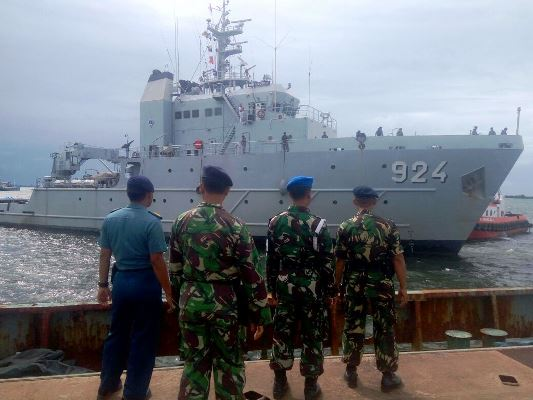
- KRI Leuser (924)

History

Indonesia
- Name: KRI Leuser
- Commissioned: 22 August 2002
- Identification: IMO number: 9237515; MMSI number: 525924924; Callsign: PLBP
- Status: In active service

General characteristics
- Class & type: Soputan-class seagoing tugs
- Displacement: 2,300 tons full loads
- Length: 71.5 m (234 ft 7 in)
- Beam: 9 m (29 ft 6 in)
- Draught: 5.5 m (18 ft 1 in)
- Speed: 15 knots (28 km/h; 17 mph) maximum
- Complement: 120
- Armament: 2 x 20 mm Oerlikon cannon

KRI Leuser (924) is an Indonesian naval vessel of the Soputan-class ocean-going tugs. Leuser's name is derived from Mount Leuser with its Leuser Ecosystem, the highest mountain in Aceh province. The ship is a seagoing tugs, the second vessel of the Soputan class designed by South Korean company, Daesun Shipbuilding and built under license by PT. Dok dan Perkapalan Kodja Bahari (DKB) in Jakarta, Indonesia. The ship was launched on 22 August 2002.

== Service history ==
The Leuser was deployed to aid in the search for the missing Adam Air Flight 574 in January 2007.
