= Ahmadi Heri Purwono =

Indonesian admiral

Vice Admiral Ahmadi Heri Purwono
- Born: 28 October 1965 (age 60); Semarang, Central Java, Indonesia
- Children: Randy; Shandy
- Relatives: Dwi Astuti Rahayu
- Military career
- Allegiance: Indonesia
- Branch: Indonesian Navy
- Service years: 1988–2023
- Rank: Vice Admiral
- Commands: Vice Chief of Staff of Indonesian Navy
- Awards: See Awards

Vice Admiral Ahmadi Heri Purwono (born 28 October 1965) is a vice admiral in the Indonesian Navy who served as a Senior Officer (Indonesian: Perwira Tinggi) to the Deputy Chief of Naval Staff. The last position of this three-star general was Commander of the Fleet Command I.

== Career ==
He graduated from the Indonesian Naval Academy in 1988. He has served various assignments both on warships and on staff.

His education and training later included Suspaja TA (1988), Dikspespa/Art Angk-7 TA (1992/1993), Diklapa-II/Koum Angk-11 TA (1997/1998), Seskoal Angk-39 TA 2001, Dikreg Sesko TNI Angk-38 TA (2011) and Lemhannas RI PPRA Angk-52 TA (2014).

On 11 June 2021, he was selected as a candidate to replace Admiral Yudo Margono.

== Awards ==
Bintang Yudha Dharma Nararya

Bintang Dharma

Satyalancana Seroja

Bintang Jalasena Nararya

Satyalancana Kesetiaan 24 years' service

Satyalancana Kesetiaan 16 years' service

Satyalancana Kesetiaan 8 years' service

Satyalancana Dwidya Sistha

Satyalancana Kebhaktian Sosial

Satyalancana Dharma Nusa

Satyalancana Wira Dharma

Satyalancana Ksatria Yudha

== Position ==
- Palaksa KRI Yos Sudarso (1990)
- Dandiv-B Korsis AAL
- Palaksa KRI Ajak
- Commander of KRI Soputan
- Commander of KRI Sura
- Commander of KRI Singa
- Commander of KRI Badik
- Pabanrem SOPS Armatim
- Balikpapan Lanal Commander
- Dirminlakgar Ditjenrehan Ministry of Defense RI
- Danlantamal VIII/Manado (2017–2018)
- Kaskoarmada II (2018–2019)
- Pankolinlamil (2019–2020)
- Commander I (2020)
- Wakasal (2020–Present)

== See also ==
- Indonesian military ranks
