= Sri Mohamad Darojatim =

Indonesian admiral

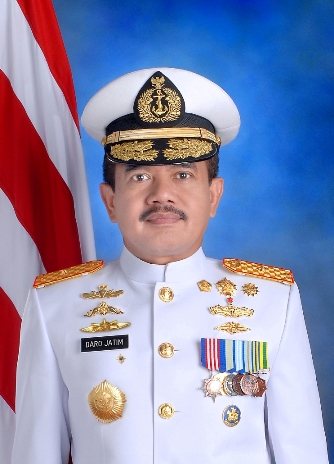
- Born: 6 July 1957 (age 69); Bojonegoro, Bojonegoro Region, Indonesia
- Military career
- Allegiance: Indonesia
- Branch: Indonesian Navy
- Service years: 1982-2015
- Rank: Rear Admiral
- Commands: Chief of Staff of Indonesian Navy
- Awards: See Awards

Sri Mohamad Darojatim (born 6 July 1957) is a former rear admiral in the Indonesian Navy who served as its Chief of Staff (Indonesian: Kepala Pelaksanan Harian) to the Bakorkamla in the navy.

== Career ==
He graduated from the Naval Academy on 6 July 1957. Since being appointed as a Navy officer with the rank of Second Lieutenant, Darojatim has served various assignments both on warships and on staff.

Military education that has been followed apart from AAL is the Youth Officers Course (1982), Electronic Warfare Course (Royal Navy) at Portsmouth-UK (1985), Helicopter Controller Course (Royal Navy), Portland-UK (1985), Dikspespa Kom (1987/ 1988), Diklapa II Koum (1990/1991), Marine Inspection Course (1991), Seskoal class-34 (1996/1997), Sesko TNI Batch-29 (2002), and Lemhannas PPRA batch-41 (2008).

His assignment began in 1982-1991 as a Navy officer on the Satban and Satkorarmatim ships. Then from 1991 to 2001, he served as Commander of KRI Sungai Gerong, Commander of KRI Rakata, Commander of KRI Ajak, Commander of KRI Mandau, Commander of KRI Badik, Commander of KRI Malahayati and Commander of KRI Yos Sudarso.

On Friday, 23 May 2014, the handover ceremony for the position of Pangarmatim from Rear Admiral Agung Pramono to Rear Admiral Sri Mohamad Darojatim was held at the Koarmatim Pier, Ujung Surabaya, Friday, with the Inspector of Ceremonies (Irup) Chief of Naval Staff (Kasal) Admiral dr. Marsetio.

== Awards ==
Bintang Yudha Dharma Nararya

Bintang Jalasena Pratama

Bintang Jalasena Nararya

Satyalancana Seroja

Satyalancana Kesetiaan 24 years' service

Satyalancana Kesetiaan 16 years' service

Satyalancana Kesetiaan 8 years' service

Satyalancana Dwidya Sistha

Satyalancana Kebhaktian Sosial

Satyalancana Dharma Nusa

Satyalancana Wira Karya

Satyalancana Wira Dharma

Satyalancana Dharma Samudra

== Position ==
- Commander of KRI Sungai Gerong
- Commander of KRI Rakata
- Commander of KRI Ajak
- Commander of KRI Mandau
- Commander of KRI Badik
- Commander of KRI Malahayati
- Commander of KRI Yos Sudarso
- Asops Danguskamlabar (2001)
- Commander of the Fast Ship Squadron, Flotila I Koarmatim (2002)
- Expert Staff of Pangarmatim “B” Komsos (2002)
- Head of Yudha Sports Center (Kapusoyu) Seskoal (2002)
- Commander of the Koarmatim Fast Ship Flotila (2003)
- Assistant Operations Commander of the Military Cross-Sea Command (2004)
- Assistant Operations Commander of the Indonesian Fleet Command for Eastern Region (2005)
- Assistant Officer II Operations (Paban II Ops) Kasal Operations Staff (2005)
- Commander of the Sigma Corvette Task Force in the Netherlands (2005)
- Deputy Governor of the Naval Academy (2007)
- Commander of the Koarmatim Marine Combat Group (2008)
- Deputy Assistant Planning and Cash Budget (2010)
- Deputy Commander of the Naval Command and Staff College (2010)
- Pankolinlamil (2012)
- Pangarmatim(2014)
- Kalakhar Bakorkamla (2014)

== See also ==
- Indonesian military ranks
