= Adam Air Flight 172 =

2007 aviation accident in Indonesia

Coordinates: 7.379°S 112.778°E

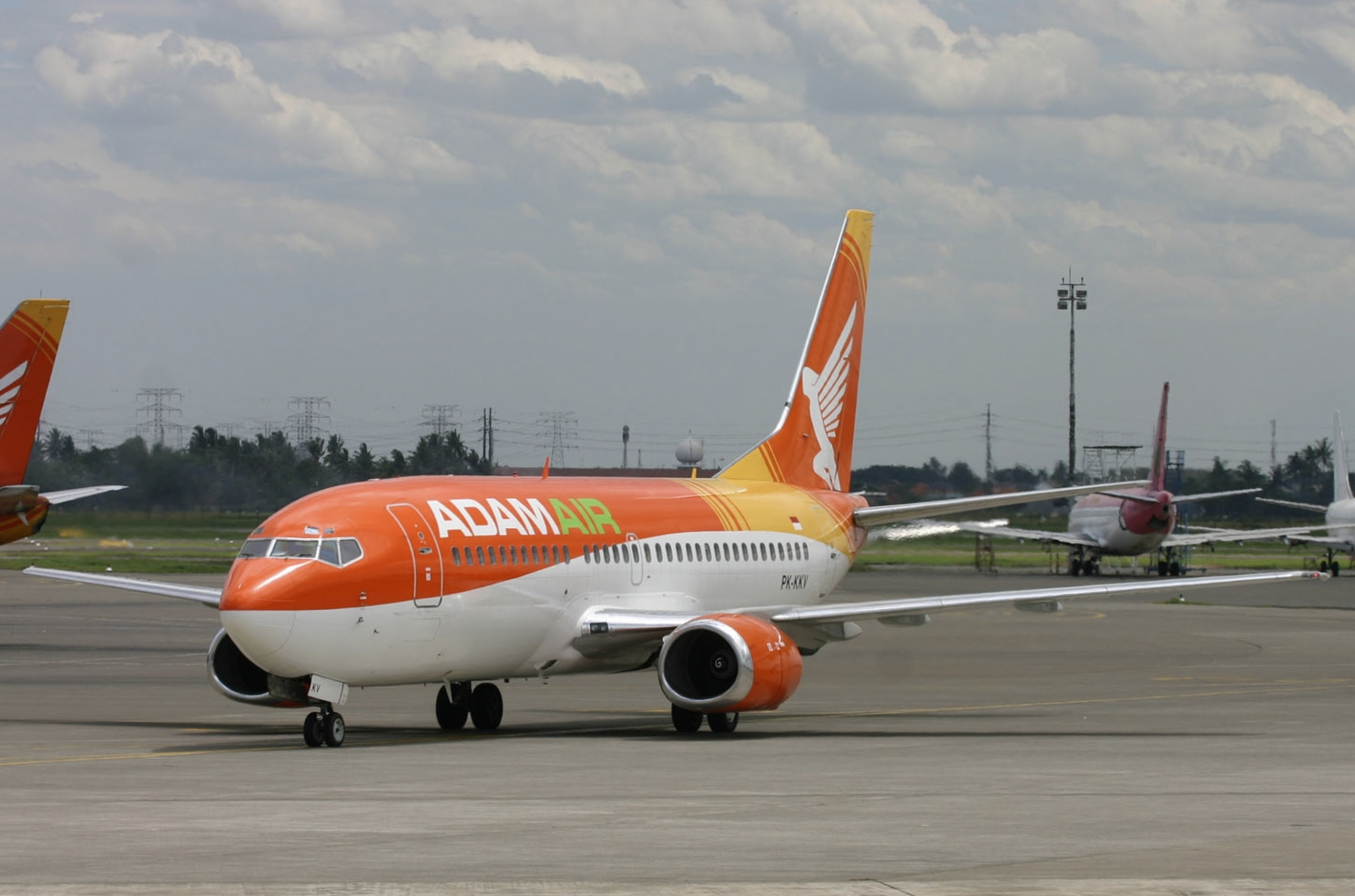
- PK-KKV, the aircraft involved in the accident, seen in January 2007

Accident
- Date: 21 February 2007
- Summary: Structural failure upon landing; pilot error
- Site: Juanda International Airport, Surabaya, East Java, Indonesia

Aircraft
- Aircraft type: Boeing 737-33A
- Operator: Adam Air
- IATA flight No.: KI172
- ICAO flight No.: DHI172
- Call sign: ADAM SKY 172
- Registration: PK-KKV
- Flight origin: Soekarno–Hatta International Airport, Jakarta, Java, Indonesia
- Destination: Juanda International Airport, Surabaya, East Java, Indonesia
- Occupants: 155
- Passengers: 148
- Crew: 7
- Fatalities: 0
- Injuries: 2
- Survivors: 155

Adam Air Flight 172 was a scheduled domestic passenger flight from Soekarno–Hatta International Airport to Juanda Airport, Surabaya, Indonesia. On 21 February 2007, the Boeing 737-300 operating the flight made a hard landing at Surabaya and suffered cracking of the fuselage in the middle of the passenger section. All six of Adam Air's remaining 737s were immediately grounded, though five of them were back in regular service later that year. This incident caused further concerns regarding the safety of flights operated by Adam Air, which had received much criticism after the crash of Adam Air Flight 574 on 1 January 2007.

== Aircraft ==
The aircraft involved was a Boeing 737-300, registered as PK-KKV, with 37,936 hours of operation and 23,824 takeoffs and landings. The aircraft was manufactured in 1994.

== Accident ==
The plane fractured upon landing at Juanda International Airport, with the fuselage breaking in the middle of the passenger section. The landing was particularly hard, with baggage being ejected from cabin lockers into the cabin space. The tail section of the plane was bent down compared to the rest of the plane. Immediately after the incident, other flights headed for the airport were diverted. Adam Air's fleet of Boeing 737-300s was grounded for safety inspections in the interim. In the night after the accident, and before the NTSC had completed its investigation, Adam Air repainted the aircraft, covering the original orange livery with a plain white exterior. The Director of Safety of Adam Air denied that the painting was intended to cover up any evidence, saying that the airline was handling the aircraft in accordance with procedures. In the immediate aftermath, some passengers cancelled their flights with Adam Air, claiming that they were worried about the aircraft at the airline. All of these cancellations were refunded in full.

== Grounding of Adam Air's 737s ==
As a result of the incident, all six remaining Adam Air 737s were immediately grounded awaiting safety checks. Vice-president of Indonesia Jusuf Kalla said that all Boeing 737-300s should be checked. He eventually decided the entire Indonesian fleet of 737s should be checked. Also, suggestions were made that Adam Air should be suspended from all operations until the entire fleet could be checked, with MP Abdul Hakim saying, "It will be good for the company and the government ... until the flight authorities can determine if Adam Air is still worthy as a national aircraft company".

The Indonesian Transport Ministry said that if the aircraft showed signs of problems, the checks would be expanded to cover all 737s operating in Indonesia. On 5 March, five of the six aircraft were reported to have returned to normal operations, but the sixth was still undergoing a full maintenance overhaul at maintenance, repair, and overhaul firm GMF AeroAsia's facility. Adam Air had resumed its normal schedule by 9 March 2007.

== Investigation ==
The accident was investigated by the National Transportation Safety Committee (NTSC). Investigators compiled data from the Indonesian weather agency and the air traffic control center in Surabaya in an attempt to determine the cause. Officials state the aircraft did pass required safety checks before its departure. Boeing announced that it would also provide technical assistance to both the authorities and the airline during the investigation.

The final report from the NTSC stated that the probable cause of the accident was an excessive sink rate upon touchdown, following an unstabilised approach. In the report, the NTSC noted that the approach was unstable below 200 feet (60 m), with a vertical speed occasionally greater than 2500 ft/min (13 m/s). The vertical acceleration on landing was measured at 5 g. Additionally, the aircraft initially touched down with the right main gear about 4 m (13 ft) outside of the runway edge.

The investigation further revealed that no technical malfunction occurred on the aircraft before touchdown.

The flight crew was criticized for not maintaining a sterile cockpit during the landing, with excessive nonflight-related discussion going on throughout the flight.

== Safety concerns ==
The safety record of Adam Air was heavily criticised, especially in the aftermath of Flight 574. Pilots reported repeated and deliberate breaches of international safety regulations, with aircraft being flown in nonairworthy states for months at a time. They claimed that incidents such as requests to sign documents to allow an aircraft to fly while not having the authority to and while knowing the plane to be not airworthy, flying a plane for several months with a damaged door handle, swapping parts between aircraft to avoid mandatory replacement deadlines, being ordered to fly aircraft after exceeding the take-off limit of five times per pilot per day, flying an aircraft with a damaged window, using spare parts from other aircraft to keep planes in the air, and the ignoring of pilots' requests not to take off due to unsafe aircraft had happened. The Associated Press quoted one pilot as saying, "Every time you flew, you had to fight with the ground staff and the management about all the regulations you had to violate." They also claim that if pilots confronted their seniors in the airline, they were grounded or docked pay.

== Aftermath ==
The Indonesian government announced plans immediately after the accident to ban jets over 10 years of age for any commercial purpose. The age limit had been 35 years or 70,000 landings. As of 2016, the Indonesian Ministry of Transport was still discussing the problem of aging aircraft, proposing to ban the import of any commercial passenger aircraft over 10 years old and banning the operation of any aircraft over 30 years old. Indonesia also announced plans to reshuffle the Transportation Ministry in response to this incident, Flight 574 and the loss of the ferries MV Senopati Nusantara and MV Levina 1. Among those to be replaced were the directors of air and sea transports and the chairman of the National Committee for Transportation Safety. Indonesia also intended to introduce a new system of ranking airlines according to their safety record, with a level-one ranking meaning the airline has no serious issues, a level-two ranking meaning the airline must fix problems, and a level-three rating forcing the airline to be shut down.

== See also ==
- Ground effect (aerodynamics)
- List of accidents and incidents involving commercial aircraft
