= Manunggal Air Service =

Indonesian airline

Manunggal Air
IATA	ICAO	Call sign
-	MNS	MANUNGGAL
- Founded: 1997
- Ceased operations: 2015
- Hubs: Halim Perdanakusuma Airport
- Fleet size: 1
- Destinations: 8
- Headquarters: Jakarta, Indonesia
- Website: http://manunggal-air.com/

Manunggal Air Services was an airline based in Jakarta, Indonesia. It operated charter passenger and cargo services within Indonesia and neighbouring regions. Its main base was Halim Perdanakusuma Airport, Jakarta.

== History ==
The airline was established and started operations in 1997.

In March 2007 the Indonesian transport ministry, under huge political pressure to improve air safety in Indonesia, warned it would close seven airlines unless they improved training and maintenance within the following three months. The ministry developed a formula for ranking the airlines in three bands. Those in the third (least safe) band were: Adam Air, Batavia Air, Jatayu Airlines, Kartika Airlines, Manunggal Air Services, Transwisata Prima Aviation and Tri-MG Intra Asia Airlines.

== Destinations ==
Before its closing, the airline offered the following destinations:

- Halim Perdanakusuma International Airport-Jakarta hub
- Ketapang Airport-Ketapang
- Supadio Airport-Pontianak
- Wamena Airport-Wamena
- Mopah Airport-Merauke

== Fleet ==
The Manunggal Air Service fleet consisted of the following aircraft (as of August 2016):

Manunggal Air Service fleet
Aircraft	In service	Orders	Passengers	Notes
British Aerospace 146-100	1	—		
Total	1			

The airline previously operated the following aircraft (as of June 2012):

- 1 British Aerospace 146-100
- 2 Transall C-160 (PK-VTP and PK-VTQ)
- Antonov An-26B
- Fokker F28 Fellowship

== Incidents and accidents ==
- On 11 June 1999, five minutes after takeoff the ATC lost contact with a Kamov helicopter. Two hours later the helicopter was reported missing and ATC started searching. The helicopter was found crashed inland of Irian Jaya. One person was killed and five people were injured.
- On 15 June 2001 a Transall C-160NG (registered PK-VTP) was heavily damaged after landing at Jayapura-Sentani Airport
- On 6 March 2008 their other Transall C-160NG (registered PK-VTQ) was destroyed on landing. All the plane's occupants survived.
