= KRI Ajak =

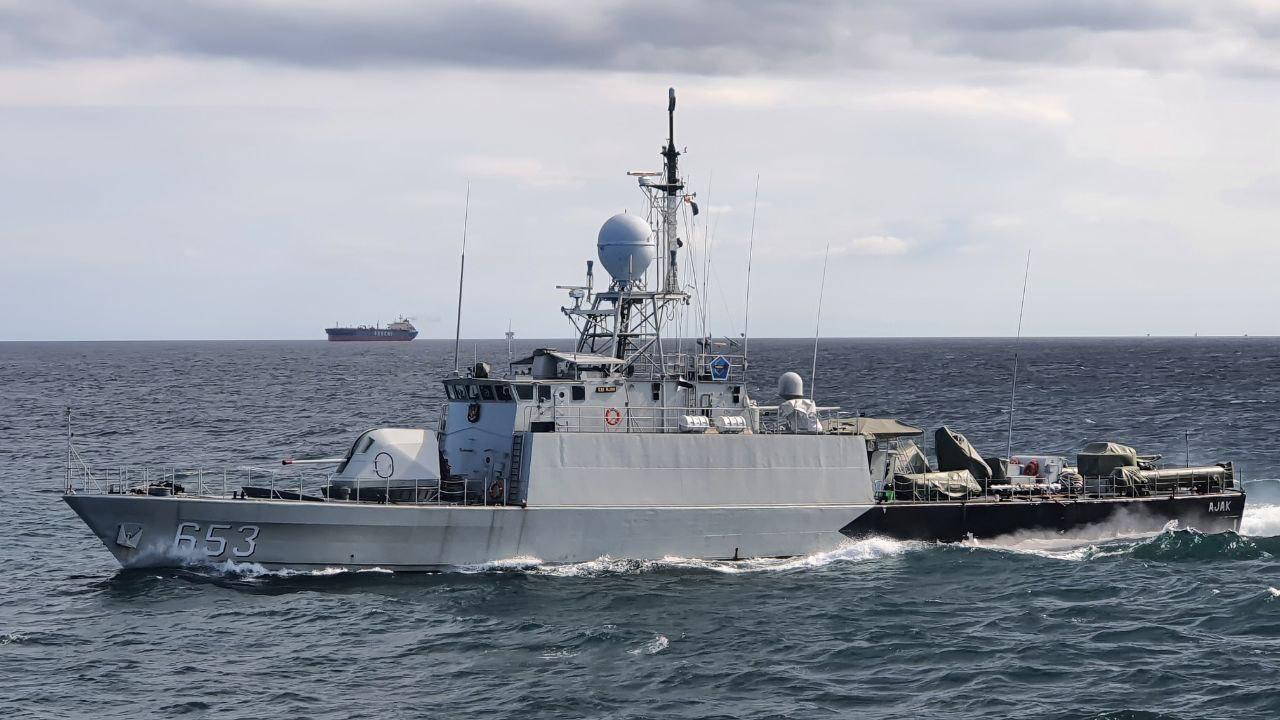
- KRI Ajak in Makassar Strait on 6 March 2021

History

Indonesia
- Name: KRI Ajak
- Namesake: Dhole in Indonesian
- Commissioned: 1989
- Identification: Pennant number: 653
- Status: In active service

General characteristics
- Type: FPB-57 Nav II patrol boat
- Displacement: 445 tonnes
- Length: 58.10 m (190.6 ft)
- Beam: 7.62 m (25.0 ft)
- Draught: 2.95 m (9.7 ft)
- Propulsion: 2 x MTU 60V 956 TB92
- Speed: 27 knots (50 km/h)
- Range: 6,000 nautical miles (11,000 km) at 15 knots (28 km/h)
- Complement: 42 crew
- Sensors & processing systems: Sonar PHS-32; Decca Radar; DR-2000 S3 intercept fire control
- Electronic warfare & decoys: Dagie decoy RL
- Armament: 1 x SAK 57mm Bofor; 1 x SAK 40mm Bofors; 2 x Rheinmetall 20mm autocannons; 2 x Single torpedo

KRI Ajak is an PB-57 Mk II (Andau class) ASW patrol boats operated by the Indonesian Navy.

== Notable deployments ==
KRI Ajak was deployed to help look for the missing Adam Air Flight 574.
