= Adam Air =

Indonesian airline (2002–2008)

IATA	ICAO	Call sign
KI	DHI	ADAM SKY
- Founded: 22 November 2002; 24 years ago
- Ceased operations: March 2008; 18 years ago (flight operations); 18 June 2008; 18 years ago (liquidation)
- Hubs: Soekarno-Hatta International Airport
- Focus cities: Polonia International Airport; Juanda International Airport
- Fleet size: 37
- Destinations: 27
- Headquarters: Jakarta, Indonesia
- Website: www.flyadamair.com (archived)

Adam Air (incorporated as PT. Adam SkyConnection Airlines) was a privately owned airline based in West Jakarta, Jakarta, Indonesia. It operated scheduled domestic services to over 20 cities and international services to Penang and Singapore. Its main base was Soekarno-Hatta International Airport, Jakarta.

Although sometimes referred to as a low-cost carrier, it marketed itself as an airline straddled between low-cost and traditional carriers, offering both on-board meal service and low fares, similar to the model adopted by Singapore-based Valuair. Prior to the crash of Flight 574, it had been the fastest-growing low-cost carrier in Indonesia.

== History ==
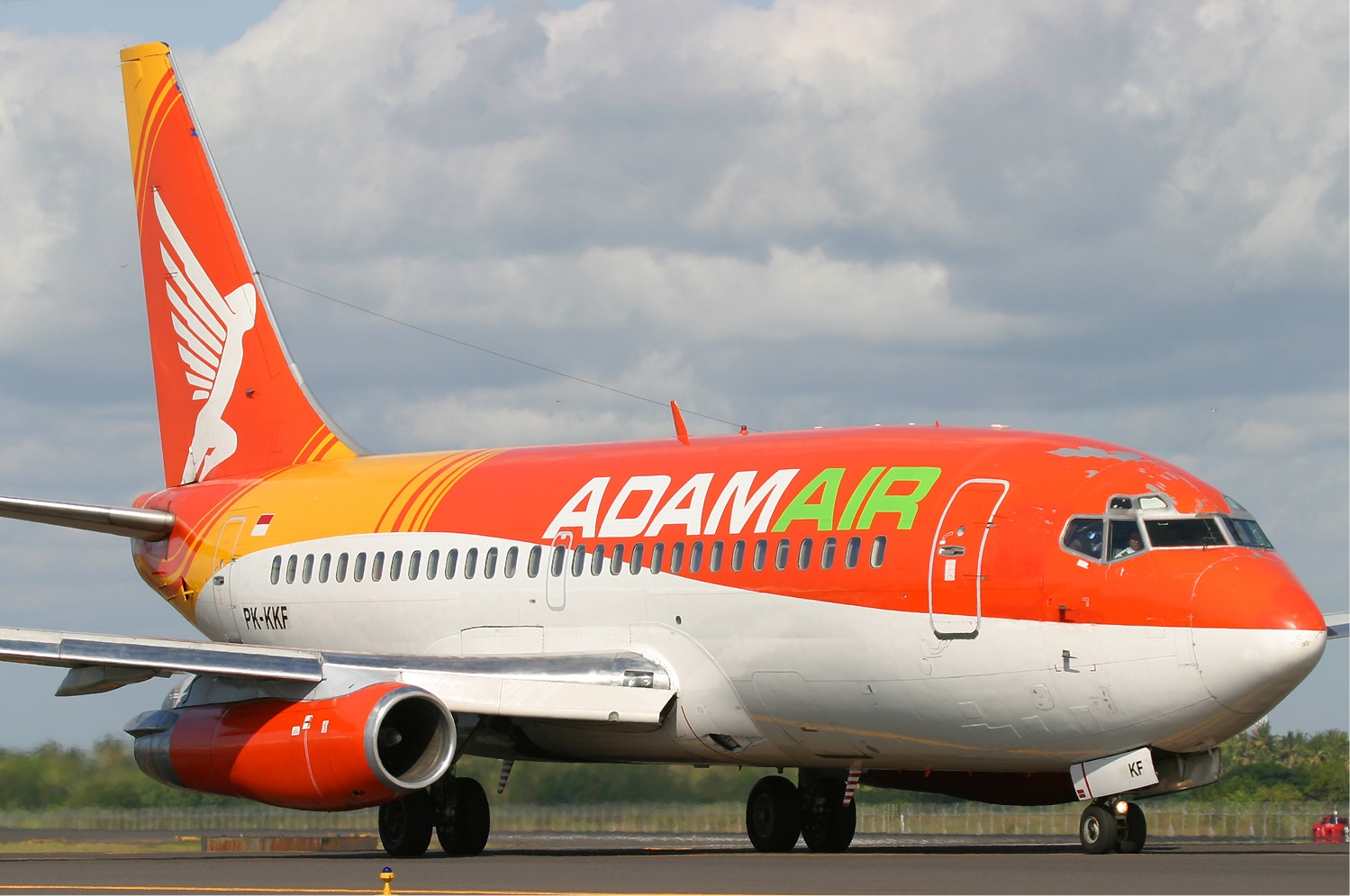
Adam Air Boeing 737-200 in its standard livery

Adam Air was founded in 2002 by Agung Laksono, an Indonesian businessman and the Speaker of Indonesia's House of Representatives, and Sandra Ang. Sandra Ang is from an Indonesian-Chinese family which owned the airline. The airline was named after Sandra Ang's 26-year-old son Adam Suherman, who was named chief executive officer (CEO) of the airline. After studying in the United States, Suherman suggested that his family form an airline.

The airline was established in 2002 and began operations on 19 December 2003 with two Boeing 737-400 aircraft leased from GE Commercial Aviation Services with first flight was from Jakarta to Medan and Denpasar.

Adam Air had been involved in talks with multiple private investors, including discussions about the sale of a 20% stake to Qantas, a takeover bid from private equity fund Texas Pacific Group, and a planned initial public offering in Singapore. However, foreign investment interest evaporated with the crash of Flight 574.

Indonesian investment firm PT Bhakti Investama Tbk was interested in acquiring Adam Air. The company already owned a stake in PT Indonesia Air Transport Tbk, a subsidiary of Pt Media Nusantara Citra Tbk, and president Hary Djaja says that "Given our experience with IAT, which has an excellent safety record, we're certain that we will be able to create positive synergies and improve the way Adam Air is run.". Adam Air ultimately sold a fifty percent stake of itself to PT Bhakti Investama.

Aviation consultant Gerry Soejatman stated that Adam Air was successful because of its "fresh image", referring to the bright colors of the airline's livery and uniforms. On August 22, 2006, Soejatman posted on Airliners.net, accusing the airline of poorly maintaining its aircraft, saying that any Adam Air aircraft is at risk of becoming "a smoking hole in the ground."

Following the crash of Adam Air Flight 292 in Batam, PT Bhakti Investama and business consortium Bright Star Perkasa, which together own 50 percent share in Adam Air, announced that they would bail their investments and sell their shares back to the carrier's founders. Bhakti Investama's investor relations official Henry Suparman did not cite any specific safety incident in the airline but said that Bhakti had not seen any significant progress in the airline's handling of safety issues in the past year.

== Controversy ==
=== Safety ===
Adam Air's safety record, like a number of other Indonesian airlines, had been heavily criticised. Pilots had reported repeated and deliberate breaches of international safety regulations due to the airline's attitude towards them and aircraft being flown in non-airworthy states for months at a time. They said that there had been such incidents as:

1. Requests to sign documents to allow an aircraft to fly, while not having the authority to do so or knowing that the plane was not airworthy (or both),
2. Flying one plane with a damaged door handle and another with a damaged window for months,
3. Swapping parts between planes to avoid mandatory replacement deadlines,
4. Being ordered to fly after exceeding the take-off limit of five times per pilot per day,
5. Using spare parts from other planes to attempt to keep planes in the air, and
6. Ignoring pilots' requests to abort takeoff, even though the planes were obviously unsafe.

The Associated Press quoted one Adam Air pilot as saying that "Every time you flew, you had to fight with the ground staff and the management about all the regulations you had to violate." They also said that if the airline's pilots confronted their seniors, they were grounded or docked pay.

=== Corruption ===
The Asia Times said it had spoken to "some well-placed local sources requesting anonymity", who claimed that Agung Laksono did not invest any of his own money into Adam Air, instead using money available to him through his official government position. Furthermore, Laksono's position gave him the unfair advantage of receiving heavily regulated licenses and airport landing rights. The same people claimed that the Ang family had no previous experience in the aviation industry. Adam Air's original advertising campaign contained statements considered by many to be direct lies, telling passengers to take to the skies with its "new Boeing 737-400s", despite the fact that its two Boeings, leased from GE Capital Aviation Services, were used and over fifteen years old. At the time Adam Air was founded, the 737 aircraft families (Boeing 737 Original (-200) and 737 Classics) making up Adam Air's fleet had been out-of-production for several years, long replaced by the 737 Next Generation family.

After an incident in which an Adam Air aircraft landed 525 km (326 mi) away from its intended destination, the pilots blamed a malfunctioning navigation system. The airline claimed the equipment to be in good working order, and had the pilots arrested on charges of endangering passenger safety. Immediately after the incident, the Directorate General of Air Communications (DGAC) sent instructions to Adam Air to repair the faulty system. The airline was then required to conduct a total of thirteen test flights with DGAC inspectors aboard before the aircraft could return to commercial service. Adam Air instead left behind a team from the National Transportation Safety Committee (KNKT), who they were supposed to transport to the site, and sent only their own engineers. According to Adam Air, they repaired the fault, and the aircraft was immediately returned to service without any inspection. Iksan Tatang, director general of air transportation, said the incident was "a serious violation", and promised a full investigation. However, no sign of the investigation's findings exists on the public record, and it is unclear if an investigation took place at all. Critics say Adam Air used its political connections to sidestep aviation authorities.

When asked by Tempo magazine what caused the fatal crash of Adam Air Flight 574 in January 2007, before Adam Air agreed (nine months later) to help find the wreckage, chief executive officer Suherman said: "It was a weather problem. Everything was okay when the plane took off, except for the X factor. We are not God." However, at that time, the Asia Times was already suggesting that because of corruption, the real cause of the crash might never be known.

=== Other legal issues ===
Large numbers of pilots joined the airline when it was founded in 2003, but most of them quit years later over safety concerns mostly after the crash of Flight 574.

On 10 January 2007 there was a report that Indonesian consumer and labour groups were planning to lodge a US$100 million suit, claiming the airline neglected safety in order to save money.

On 21 February 2007 it was reported that 13 Adam Air employees, as well as an employee of airport operator PT Angkasa Pura, working at Soekarno-Hatta International Airport had been arrested for fraudulent data manipulation. The scheme involved manipulating passenger data to show passengers as 'leaving the country'. This meant that they were automatically charged a duty of 30,000 Rupiah each, when in reality they owed none. The money was then split between fourteen staff members. A computer from the check-in desk, as well as passenger tickets and lists, were seized.

On 17 May 2007 Adam Air pilots decided to resign due to poor navigational systems with which they were forced to fly. The airline sued all of them since their contract length had not been fulfilled. A Liputan 6 article stated that Adam Air was not attempting to claim for damage caused by the pilots' public accusations of poor safety standards.

== Warnings and subsequent shutdown ==
On March 16, 2007, the Indonesian government announced the shut down of an unspecified Indonesian air carrier. Although no details were immediately released, it was revealed that the airline had had a string of recent accidents, making Adam Air a likely candidate. One official from the airline, speaking anonymously as he was not permitted to speak to the press, said that Adam Air was "prepared for the worst." It was announced on March 22 that Adam Air was one of seven airlines that would lose their licences within three months unless they could improve their safety standards. The other six airlines involved were Bouraq Indonesia Airlines, Transwisata Prima Aviation, Tri-MG Intra Asia Airlines, Manunggal Air Services, Jatayu Airlines and Kartika Airlines. All fifty-four of Indonesia's airlines were told to make some improvements.

It was reported on June 28, 2007, that Adam Air would escape shutdown and had upgraded its safety rating to the middle tier. By then, four airlines had had their licences revoked and five others were grounded pending improvements.

As reported on the local news, Adam Air reduced many of its flights. Adam Air decreased its frequencies to only several flights departing both from Jakarta Airport and Surabaya Airport.

On 16 March 2008, Adam Air was given 21 days by the Indonesian government to decide whether to close down after safety concerns prompted an investment group to unload its 50 percent stake in the airline. The following day, the president of Adam Air announced that more than half of the fleet had been seized after the airline defaulted on payments.

"Out of 22 planes, now we only have 10 because 12 of them have been declared in default. The other 10 have been declared in default as well, but I'm still trying to work out a way to restructure the payments," Adam Suherman was quoted as saying.

On 18 March 2008, after an accident at Batam, in which a Boeing 737 skidded off the runway while landing, the Indonesian government suspended Adam Air's Air Operator Certificate and gave them three months to show safety improvements.

On 18 June 2008, the Indonesian government revoked Adam Air's operator certificate, and the airline ceased operations.

Prior to its demise, the company was in serious financial trouble. The company's owner (Sandra Ang) had been allegedly embezzling the company's money. The financial losses from the embezzlement reportedly amounted to Rp 2.1 trillion (approximately US$210 million). On August 12, 2008, the Indonesian police named Sandra Ang as a suspect for money embezzlement. She was later arrested and also banned from leaving the country.

By the end of 2008, almost every single one of Adam Air's planes was returned to lessor. Only 1 of its 737-200s remained, which was scrapped in Bandung 3 years later.

== Fleet ==
Adam Air's fleet consisted of Boeing 737s during its entire operation.

Adam Air fleet
Aircraft	Total	Introduced	Retired	Notes
Airbus A300-600	1	2005	2005	leased from Air Paradise International
Boeing 737-200	6	2004	2008	
Boeing 737-300	7	2004	2008	One crashed as Flight 172
Boeing 737-400	13	2003	2008	One crashed as Flight 574
Boeing 737-500	1	2003	2008	

At the time the airline ceased operations, it had 30 Airbus A320 aircraft on order.

== Destinations ==
=== Indonesia ===
- Java
  - Jakarta (Soekarno-Hatta International Airport) - main hub
  - Malang (Abdul Rachman Saleh Airport)
  - Semarang (Achmad Yani Airport)
  - Surabaya (Juanda International Airport) - secondary hub
  - Surakarta (Adisumarmo International Airport)
  - Yogyakarta (Adisucipto International Airport)
- Kalimantan
  - Balikpapan (Sultan Aji Muhammad Sulaiman Airport)
  - Banjarmasin (Syamsudin Noor Airport)
  - Pontianak (Supadio Airport)
- Lesser Sunda Islands
  - Denpasar (Ngurah Rai Airport)
  - Kupang (El Tari International Airport)
  - Mataram (Selaparang Airport)
- Sulawesi
  - Makassar (Hasanuddin International Airport)
  - Manado (Sam Ratulangi Airport)
- Sumatra
  - Banda Aceh (Sultan Iskandarmuda Airport)
  - Bandar Lampung (Radin Inten II Airport)
  - Bengkulu (Fatmawati Soekarno Airport)
  - Jambi (Sultan Thaha Airport)
  - Medan (Polonia International Airport) - focus city
  - Padang (Minangkabau International Airport)
  - Palembang (Sultan Mahmud Badaruddin II Airport)
  - Pangkal Pinang (Pangkalpinang Airport)
  - Pekanbaru (Sultan Syarif Qasim II International Airport)

=== Malaysia ===
- Penang (Penang International Airport)

=== Singapore ===
- Singapore (Changi Airport)

== Incidents and accidents ==
In 2006, one aircraft skidded off a runway, and two others were operated despite known malfunctions related to landing gear.

=== Flight 782 ===
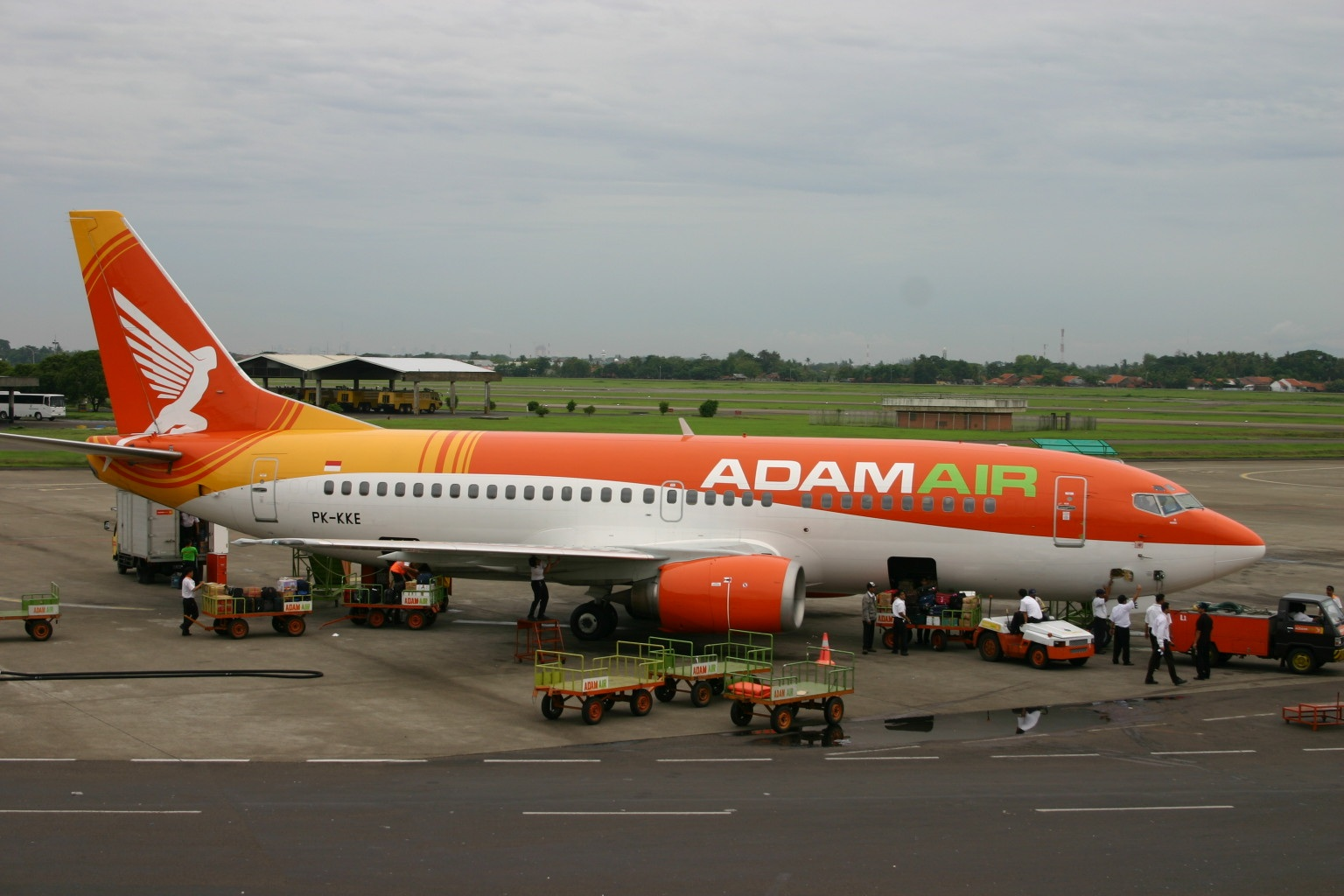
PK-KKE, the 737-300 involved as Flight 782, on 1 December 2004

On 11 February 2006, Adam Air Flight 782, a Boeing 737-300 registered as PK-KKE, lost navigational and communications systems 20 minutes into a flight from Jakarta to Makassar, Sulawesi. The aircraft was subsequently flown into a radar "black spot" and was lost for several hours, eventually making an emergency landing at Tambolaka Airport, Sumba (on a different island 481 kilometres (299 mi; 260 nmi) away from their intended destination, and southeast from their origin, instead of northeast). The pilot in that incident was fired. Adam Air broke multiple safety regulations, including removing an aircraft before it was due for inspection by aviation authorities.

=== Flight 574 ===
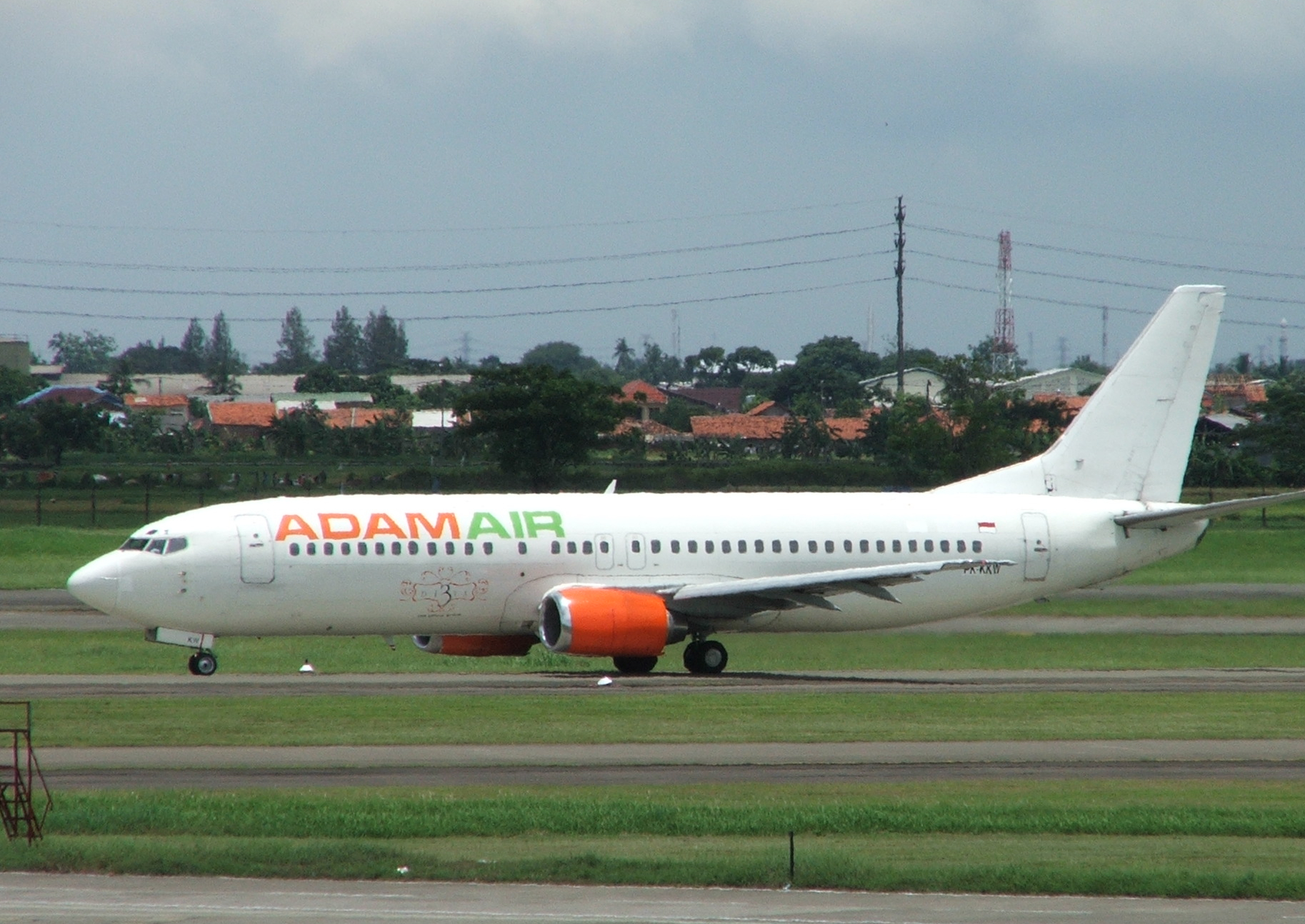
PK-KKW, the aircraft involved as Flight 574, seen here on 23 March 2006

On 1 January 2007, Adam Air Flight 574, a Boeing 737-400 with the registration PK-KKW (c/n 24070), crashed into the Makassar Strait near Polewali in Sulawesi on 1 January 2007. All 96 passengers and 6 crew on board were killed.

Air traffic controllers lost contact with the flight en route from Surabaya (SUB) to Manado (MDC). On January 10, parts of the aircraft's tail stabilizer were found 300 metres (980 ft) offshore. The flight recorders and suspected debris were located, but were not initially recovered due to a dispute between Adam Air and the Indonesian Government over who should pay recovery costs. Both recorders were retrieved after Adam Air agreed to pay for seven days of searching.

A 2009 episode of Mayday (Air Crash Investigation, Air Emergency) about Flight 574 stated that the official crash report had concluded the Inertial Reference System (IRS) had failed. This failure, which should not by itself have brought the plane down, caused the pilots to become preoccupied with trying to fix it. After changing the IRS from "Navigate" mode to "Attitude" mode, the pilots failed to manually fly the plane while the computer system recalibrated, a procedure that takes about 30 seconds. The failure to maintain straight and level flight during the recalibration caused the autopilot to completely disengage and cease compensating for the plane's tendency to roll to the right, which caused the nose of the plane to dip. In attempting to correct the pitch of the aircraft before levelling the wings, the pilot sent the aircraft into an unrecoverable downward spiral, leading to the plane suffering massive structural failure as it descended at nearly the speed of sound. The investigation disclosed that the accident aircraft, including the faulty IRS and several other systems, had been the subject of more than 40 pilot complaints, or "write ups" in the months prior to the crash.

=== Flight 172 ===
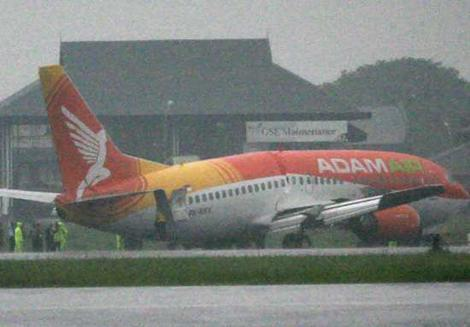
Adam Air Flight 172 after impact on the runway

On 21 February 2007, Adam Air Flight 172, a Boeing 737-300 aircraft flying from Jakarta to Surabaya with registration PK-KKV (c/n 27284), had a hard landing at Juanda International Airport. The incident caused the fuselage of the plane to crack and bend at the middle, with the tail of the plane drooping towards the ground. There were no reports of serious injuries from the incident. Subsequent flights to the airport were diverted to alternate airports. As a result, six Adam Air 737s were grounded awaiting safety checks, but five of these were then put back in regular service. Adam Air described this as "harsh punishment" for an accident it blamed on poor weather conditions, but Vice President Jusuf Kalla has said that all Boeing 737-300s should be checked.

=== Flight 292 ===
On 10 March 2008, Adam Air Flight 292, a Boeing 737-400 registered as PK-KKT, flying from Jakarta to Batam, skidded 75 metres (246 ft; 82 yd) off the end of the runway while landing in Batam. All 171 passengers and 6 crew members survived, with two passengers treated for shock. The plane sustained damage to one wing and was ultimately written off by its lessor. This accident contributed to the airline's demise, just eight days later, and the formal revocation of its AOC three months later. The incident also illustrated that crew were not trained correctly on evacuation procedures. In particular, during the evacuation of this aircraft no slides were deployed to allow the passengers off the aircraft.
