= Transwisata Prima Aviation =

Airline based in Indonesia

IATA	ICAO	Call sign
—	TWT	—
- Founded: 2000
- Operating bases: Halim Perdanakusuma Airport
- Fleet size: 4
- Website: http://transwisata.com/

Transwisata Prima Aviation is an airline based in Indonesia. It operates charter services. Transwisata Prima Aviation is listed in category 2 by Indonesian Civil Aviation Authority for airline safety quality.

== Fleet ==
The Transwisata Air fleet consists of the following aircraft (as of September 2020):

Transwisata Air fleet
Aircraft	In service	Orders	Passengers	Notes
Gulfstream IV – SP	1	—		
Casa 212 – 200	1	—		
King Air 350i	1	—		
Bell 412 EP	1	—		
Total	4			

In 2007 the Transwisata Prima Aviation fleet included the following aircraft:

- 5 Fokker 50
- 2 Fokker 100
- 1 Fokker F28 Mk4000
