= Sinking of MV Acita 03 =

2007 maritime incident in Sulawesi, Indonesia

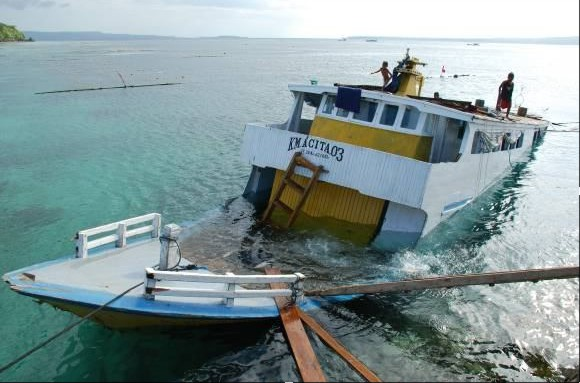
- MV Acita 03 being evacuated by locals after it had capsized off Baubau

Details
- Date: 18 October 2007; 18 years ago 21:00 local time (UTC+8)
- Location: Jembatan Batu Harbor, Baubau, Southeast Sulawesi
- Coordinates: 05°31′S 122°33′E
- Country: Indonesia
- Cause: Improper loading; Inappropriate passenger behavior; Design flaw

Statistics
- Passengers: 174
- Deaths: 31
- Injured: 134
- Missing: 9 (presumed dead)

The sinking of MV Acita 03 occurred on the night of 18 October 2007 when a ferry carrying 174 passengers and crews accidentally capsized during its docking in Baubau, Southeast Sulawesi. 134 passengers and crews survived the disaster while 30 passengers and 1 crew member lost their lives. 9 people were listed as missing and presumed dead.

The disaster is regarded as one of the deadliest maritime disaster in Southeast Sulawesi. It was also the second deadliest maritime disaster in Indonesia in 2007, after the MV Levina 1 disaster off the coast of Jakarta, which killed more than 50 people.

Investigation conducted by the Indonesian National Transportation Safety Committee concluded that the main cause of the accident was due to the improper loading of the passengers and crews. During its docking to Baubau, one side of the ferry was overly crowded with passengers who were searching for phone signals, causing it to capsize.

== Incident ==
Mv Acita 03 departed Tomia Island Harbor on 10:30 a.m local time. Harbor officials in Tomia Island, Wakatobi Regency had not calculated the ferry's draft, even though it was mandatory. Prior to its departure, the Captain had signed a sailing declaration, declaring that the ferry was only carrying as many as 60 passengers and cargo weighing at least 15 tonnes (15,000 kg; 33,000 lb). The weather condition was in good condition, with high waves reportedly not present. Visibility was also reported to be good. The ferry was expected to arrive in Baubau at 18:30-20:30 p.m local time.

It was mudik season at the time, so the ferry was more crowded than usual.

At 21:00 local time, MV Acita 03 arrived at Masir Strait. At the time, the ferry was only 4 nautical miles (7.4 km; 4.6 mi) off its destination, Jembatan Batu Harbor, which was located on Lakeba Beach. Lakeba Beach was able to be seen, located on the starboard of the ferry. The passengers then began to prepare to disembark from the ferry. They then began to search for phone signals to inform their relatives or friends to pick them up at the harbor. On the second deck, a passenger suddenly shouted that they had found signals on the ferry. This further attracted the other passengers to search for phone signals.

Passengers began to move to the ferry's starboard. Some even climbed onto the roof of the ferry. Due to this, the ferry started to list. Crew members who were aware about the situation began to shout to the passengers on the imminent danger and ordered the passengers to stop. This was not listened by the passengers, who continued to search for phone signals.

The ferry then immediately capsized to its starboard, dropping dozens of passengers to the sea. The Captain immediately put the engines on neutral condition. 10 minutes later, the ferry had fully capsized. Some passengers were still trapped inside the ferry. In the next 10 minutes, the ferry managed to self-right itself. The capsizing happened so quickly that not a single passenger was able to wear a life-jacket.

== Search and rescue ==
Local fishermen immediately rushed to the site of the accident. At 23:00 local time, a joint search and rescue team, consisted of members of Kendari search and rescue team, members from the Baubau search and rescue team, the Indonesian Navy, local police and Indonesian Sea and Coast Guard, was assembled to search the victims of the disaster and to rescue the survivors. At least 3 ships were deployed to the site.

Rescuers managed to immediately save 61 people. 15 bodies were also recovered from the site and 30 people were listed as missing. On the early morning of 19 October, officials announced that 125 passengers and crews had been evacuated from the site. Divers were deployed to search for the missing. A search area with a radius of 7 miles (6.1 nmi; 11 km) from the location of the disaster was made. The death toll later rose to 20 as more bodies were recovered.

The search area was widened by officials, reaching as far as the Banda Sea. On 25 October, a week after the disaster, the search and rescue operation was stopped. 9 passengers were still missing and were presumed dead. The final death toll was 31 people, consisted of 30 passengers, of whom 11 of them were children, and 1 crew.

== Investigation ==
MV Acita 03 was a type of wooden ferry with a V-shaped hull. Statements collected from the operator of the ferry revealed that they had chosen this type of hull due to its efficiency. Calculations made by investigators showed that the V-shaped hull was faster than the typical wide U-shaped hull, thus saving more money. However, they also noted that due to the slim shape of the hull, the vessel was not as stable as the U-shaped hull.

Initially, the second deck was not intended as a passenger area. The decision to modify the deck into a passenger area was due to high demands in the region. As many of the people in the area were poor, most of them couldn't afford to board ferries with stricter safety rules.

According to investigators, the main cause of the accident however, was due to the poor discipline of the passengers. The massive movement of passengers to the starboard side of the ferry caused the ferry to lose its stability.

== See also ==
- Sinking of MV Sinar Bangun, ferry capsized in Lake Toba, killing more than 160 people
