= MV Lestari Maju =

Cargo ship

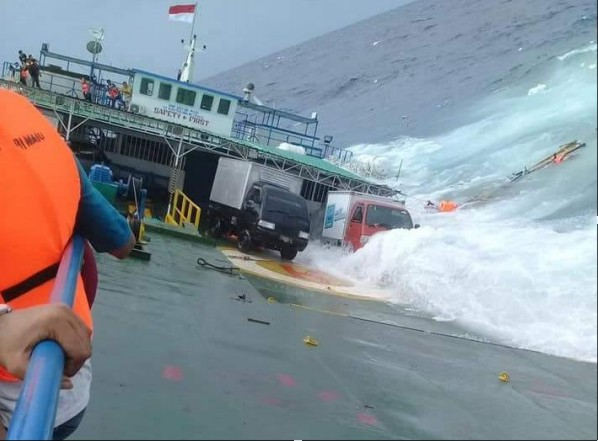
- Photograph during the sinking (taken from NTSC final report)

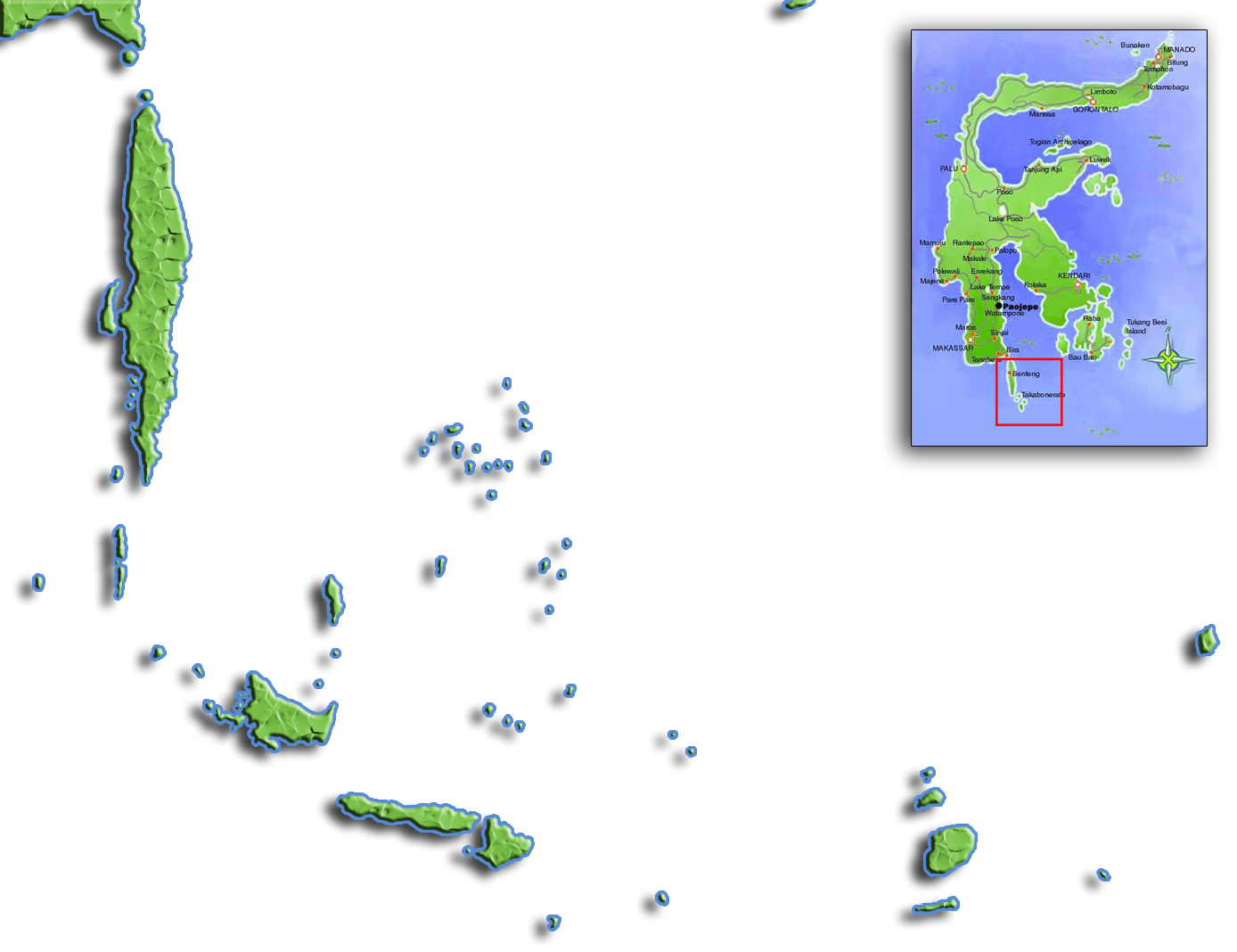
- Region where the vessel sank

Details
- Date: 3 July 2018; 8 years ago 12:00 - 13:40 (UTC+8)
- Location: Flores Sea off the coast of Selayar Islands, South Sulawesi
- Country: Indonesia
- Operator: Pelayaran Lintas Benua PT
- Incident type: Passenger, vehicle, and cargo
- Cause: Free surface effect due to rough waters

Statistics
- Vehicles: 48
- Passengers: 190
- Deaths: 35
- Injured: 155
- Damage: Ship beached near Pabadilang Beach

MV Lestari Maju was a modified 749 tonnes (737 long tons; 826 short tons) cargo ship that operated domestic passenger service from Bulukumba Regency to Selayar Islands in South Sulawesi. At noon on 3 July 2018, the ship was deliberately grounded off the Selayar Islands. The ferry had reportedly suffered a leak on the port side of the lower deck. As the ferry began to sink, the captain decided to ground the ferry to stop the sinking and ease the rescue effort. The incident killed 35 people; 155 people survived the accident.

The accident was the second major maritime disaster in Indonesia in less than a month, following the sinking of MV Sinar Bangun which killed 167 people on 18 June 2018. The sinking is the deadliest maritime disaster in South Sulawesi since 2015.

National Transportation Safety Committee of Indonesia published their findings on 9 October 2018. The investigation found that numerous critical safety regulations were not followed by the crew. It also revealed that the sinking was caused by high waves that managed to enter the ferry. The ferry's low deck height caused waves to enter the lower decks, creating a free surface effect which ultimately led the ferry to list. The ferry's overdraft condition, absence of a freeing port on the main deck and untied vehicles on board aggravated the situation.

== Incident ==
The ferry departed Bira Harbor at 10:00 a.m local time (UTC+8) en route to Pamatata Harbor, Selayar Islands, carrying 170 passengers, 20 crew members, 48 vehicles and a cargo of currency worth approximately 30 billion rupiah (roughly 2 million USD). Before the departure, officials in Bira Harbor had warned crews about the possibility of bad weather with high waves, with heights reaching 0.5–2 meters.

The ferry was traveling at a speed of 8 knots and approximately 2 hours after its departure, the weather around the area deteriorated. Waves reaching 3 metres (9.8 ft) struck the port side of the ferry and managed to enter the main deck through openings in the hull. The ferry then started to list to the port side. A crew member was sent to investigate the situation and discovered that water had entered through the front ramp gate and hull openings. Passengers started to panic as the water level increased and some began to text relatives about the situation.

At 13:00 local time, the Captain ordered the crew to use the pumps and scuppers to drain the water. However, 30 minutes later, the crew announced that all attempts to drain the water from the ferry was unsuccessful. The waves reached the upper deck and the ferry listed to an angle of 15 degrees to port. The Captain ordered the crew to begin evacuating the passengers. When the ship reached the waters near the island of Passilambena, the engines abruptly stopped.

In response to the threat of a possible capsizing, the captain decided to change the ferry's heading and beached the ferry onto the seabed, to aid the rescue efforts. At 13:40 local time, the ferry contacted the seabed approximately 300 metres (980 ft) off Pabadilang Beach. Passengers were immediately told to don life-jackets. A video showed that the ferry was listing severely during the evacuation. Multiple people jumped into the sea and tried to swim to the shore, while others were thrown from their life-rafts due to the rough waves. Vehicles on board the ferry fell and were swept away.

The Captain had sent a distress signal alerting local rescued authorities prior to grounding the ship. The Indonesian National Armed Forces, Indonesian Navy and the National Search and Rescue Agency were dispatched to the site. Makassar Naval Base dispatched KRI Madidihang-855 to the location of the incident. Local fishermen participated in the rescue effort. The rescue effort was hampered by bad weather.

As news of the accident spread, dozens of survivors and onlookers posted videos of the accident and the evacuation on social media.

== Passengers and crews ==
The passenger manifest retrieved by authorities indicated that there were 139 passengers and 48 vehicles on board MV Lestari Maju. However, rescuers reported that more than 150 passengers had been rescued from the ferry, indicating a possible data manipulation. The Public Relation of the Indonesian National Search and Rescue Agency stationed in Makassar reported that the ferry was carrying 164 passengers, 20 of them were unregistered. The NTSC, on its final report, finalized that, at the time of the sinking, there were 190 passengers and crews on board the ferry.

== Investigation ==
Calculations by the National Transportation Safety Committee showed that the ferry, during its departure from Bulukumba, had a draft of 2.02 metres (6 ft 8 in). The acceptable draft for a ferry prior to its departure is 1.75 metres (5 ft 9 in), meaning that the ferry, at the time of the departure, was overweight. The National Transportation Safety Committee revealed that there were openings located on the starboard stern and port side stern of the ferry, one of which was only 0.7 metres (2 ft 4 in) above the waterline. Due to being over weight and the low height of the openings in the ship, waves reaching 3 meters could easily enter the ferry.

Examination of the wreckage was carried out and revealed that there were only 4 scuppers on the main deck of the ferry and there was no freeing port. A scupper is meant to drain the water in small volumes, while a freeing port is used for larger volumes of water. Due to the limited amount of scuppers and the absence of a freeing port, the water on the deck wasn't able to drain quickly or effectively. The deck gradually began to collect a significant amount of water and a free surface effect occurred, causing the ferry to list to port. The untied vehicles located on the upper deck aggravated the listing.

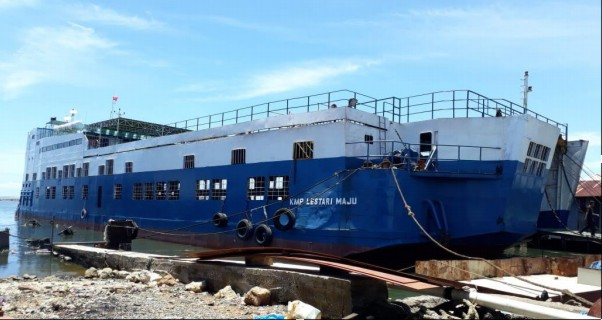
MV Lestari Maju after its salvage

The investigation also revealed that the vessel involved in the sinking was actually a converted 749 tonnes (737 long tons; 826 short tons) cargo vessel. During its modification process, the owner and surveyor of the vessel did not believe that a freeing port was necessary. The Ministry of Transportation should have prevented the vessel from being certified for passenger service. Further investigation revealed that the Ministry had instructed the vessel be modify to confirm with regulations but the dispatcher in Makassar deemed the vessel to be safe.

Investigators discovered that the crew had never been trained on how to deal with an emergency situation. During the evacuation, many passengers panicked and immediately jumped into the sea without life jackets. The crew lacked the skills for crowd control and were unable to safely evacuate the passengers effectively. The competency certificate of the Captain and the crew was also deemed "unsatisfactory" by authorities.

=== Final report ===
The final report was published on 9 October 2018. It concluded that the sinking was caused by high waves that entered the ferry due to the low deck height and openings in the hull. The absence of a proper draining system caused the deck to quickly flood with water. The flooding then caused a free surface effect creating a list to its port side and the eventual capsizing of the vessel. The untied vehicles on board contributed further to the list. The Captain managed to prevent the vessel from completely rolling over and sinking by grounding, however, poor crew performance and bad weather led to loss of life.

== See also ==
- Sinking of MV Marina Baru 2B
