= Sinking of MV Wahai Star =

2007 boating accident in Indonesia

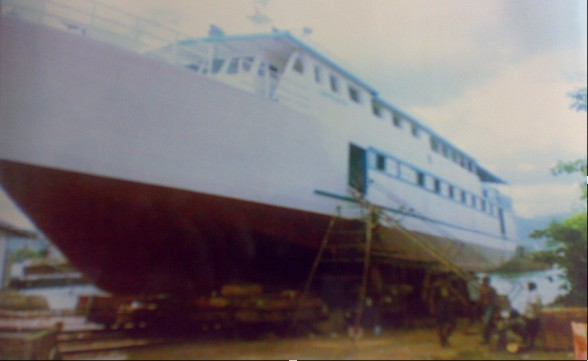
- Photograph of MV Wahai Star (taken from NTSC final report)
- Date: 10 July 2007; 18 years ago
- Time: 20:00 - 22:00 (UTC+9)
- Location: 8-9 miles off the coast of Ambon Island, Maluku, Indonesia; 03°42′00″S 127°07′00″E
- Cause: Ferry operated in an unsuitable weather condition; Tugged boat crashed onto ferry's stern, causing a leak
- Outcome: Sank off the coast of Ambon Island; 43 survivors rescued; 16 bodies recovered
- Deaths: 16 confirmed
- Missing: Unknown
- Passengers and crews: Unknown (around 60-70)
- Survivors: 43

The sinking of MV Wahai Star occurred on the night of 10 July 2007, when a speedboat tugged by the ferry accidentally crashed into its stern, resulting in a major leak. In the following days, rescuers managed to save 43 people, while 16 bodies were recovered in the nearby waters.

The investigation conducted by the Indonesian National Transportation Safety Committee concluded that the main cause of the accident was the crew's decision to continue to Ambon despite deteriorating weather conditions. While it was en route to Ambon, the speedboat that the ferry was tugging suddenly struck the stern of the ferry. After failing to stop the resulting leak, the captain instructed the passengers and crew to abandon the ferry.

== Sinking ==
MV Wahai Star departed Namrole Harbour on Buru Island at 09.00 a.m local time. A speedboat, which was used to carry the passengers to the ferry, was tugged along the route. At 20:00 p.m local time, as it was travelling to Ambon, weather conditions began to deteriorate. Heavy winds blew from the southeast and waves reaching three meters in height struck the ferry.

Crew members suddenly heard a loud impact on the stern of the ferry. A quick examination revealed that the impact was caused by the tugged speedboat. The force of the impact caused a leak in the engine compartment. Crew members tried to pump the water out of the ferry, but were forced to use buckets instead due to the sub-optimal functioning of the pump.

At 21:30, the Captain of MV Wahai Star ordered the crew members to distribute life jackets to the passengers and to issue a distress call to local authorities. This distress call was not replied to. All attempts to drain the water proved unsuccessful and the engine compartment was flooded, causing the lighting of the ferry to fail.

The ferry was repeatedly struck by waves reaching 3–4 metres (9.8–13.1 ft) high, causing the ferry to lose its stability. It began to list to its port side. At 22:00 p.m, the captain ordered all passengers and crew to abandon the ferry.

== Search and rescue ==
The vessel that managed to reach the site first was a tanker ship that was passing by. Several hours after the sinking, rescuers managed to save 23 passengers from the sea. They were taken to Ambon, the provincial capital of Maluku. Two bodies were also recovered. The rescue effort was hampered by bad weather.

On 14 July, as many as five ships were deployed. The death toll then rose to 15 as more bodies were recovered. An additional two survivors were found.

In total, rescuers managed to save 43 people, while 16 bodies were recovered. Another 15 people were declared missing and presumed dead.

== Passengers and crews ==
There were conflicting reports on the number of passengers and crew on board. Initially, between 60-100 people were reported to be on board. It was later revised to 60. The administrator of the local harbour stated that a total of 42 people were on the ferry. However, the search and rescue team reported that more than 61 people, including those who died in the sinking, had been evacuated from the sea. The final report, published by the NTSC, indicated that there were more than 60 passengers and crew on board, but did not specify an exact number.

== Investigation ==
Prior to the ferry's departure, ground officials had issued warnings not to travel to the waters around Ambon Island due to the deteriorating weather conditions. Officials suspected that the crew of the ferry ignored the warnings.

The official final report concluded that the sinking was caused by high waves produced by adverse weather conditions in the area. The high waves moved the tugged speedboat to the stern of the ferry, causing an impact powerful enough to cause a leak. Because the draining efforts were unsuccessful, the ferry flooded and capsized.

== See also ==
- Sinking of MV Dumai Express 10, a ferry sinking with a similar cause
