= Lion Air Flight 610 =

2018 aviation accident in the Java Sea

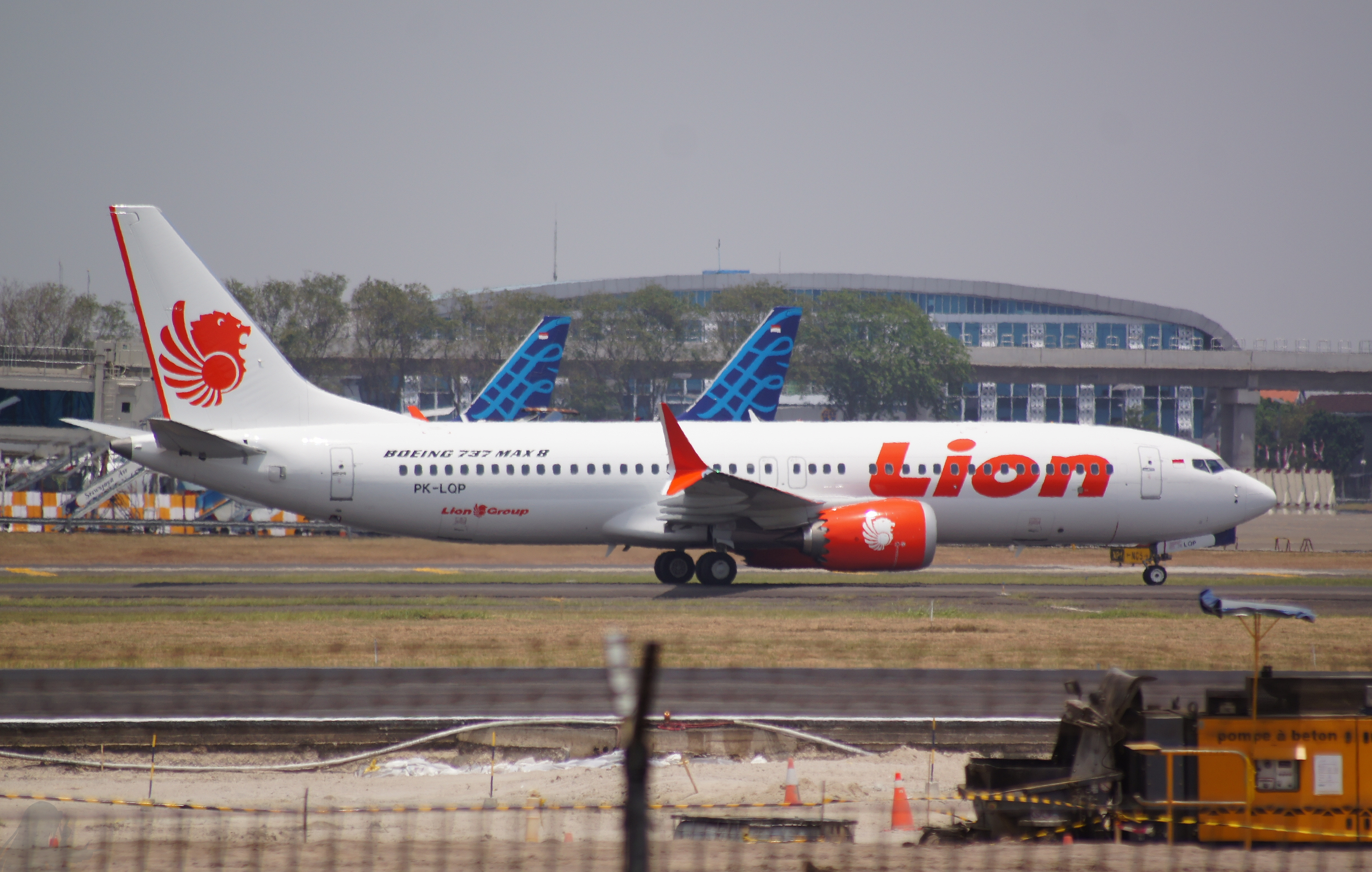
- PK-LQP, the aircraft involved in the accident, seen in September 2018

Accident
- Date: 29 October 2018
- Summary: Loss of control in flight
- Site: Java Sea, off the north coast of Karawang Regency, Indonesia; 5°46′15″S 107°07′16″E

Aircraft
- Aircraft type: Boeing 737 MAX 8
- Operator: Lion Air
- IATA flight No.: JT610
- ICAO flight No.: LNI610
- Call sign: LION INTER 610
- Registration: PK-LQP
- Flight origin: Soekarno–Hatta International Airport, Tangerang, Indonesia
- Destination: Depati Amir Airport, Pangkal Pinang, Indonesia
- Occupants: 189
- Passengers: 181
- Crew: 8
- Fatalities: 189
- Survivors: 0

Lion Air Flight 610 was a scheduled domestic passenger flight from Soekarno–Hatta International Airport, Tangerang, to Depati Amir Airport, Pangkal Pinang, in Indonesia. On 29 October 2018, the Boeing 737 MAX 8 operating the route, carrying 181 passengers and 8 crew members, crashed into the Java Sea 11 minutes after takeoff, killing all 189 occupants on board. It was the first major accident and hull loss of a 737 MAX, a then recently introduced aircraft.

It is the deadliest accident involving the Boeing 737 family, surpassing Air India Express Flight 812 in 2010. It was the deadliest accident in Lion Air's history, surpassing the 2004 Lion Air Flight 538 crash that killed 25, the deadliest aircraft accident in Indonesia since Garuda Indonesia Flight 152 in 1997, and the deadliest aircraft accident in the Java Sea, surpassing Indonesia AirAsia Flight 8501 in 2014.

The Indonesian government's search and rescue found debris and human remains soon after from a 280-kilometre-wide (150-nautical-mile) area. The first victim was identified two days after the crash. The flight data recorder (FDR) was found on 1 November and recovered for analysis. One diver also died during recovery operations.

The subsequent investigation, led by the National Transportation Safety Committee (NTSC), revealed that a new software function in the flight control system caused the aircraft to nose down. That function, the Maneuvering Characteristics Augmentation System (MCAS), had been intentionally omitted by Boeing from aircraft documentation for aircrews, so the Lion Air pilots did not know about it nor did they know what it could do. Investigators concluded that an external device on the aircraft, the angle-of-attack (AoA) sensor, was miscalibrated due to improper maintenance which sent erroneous data to MCAS. In turn, MCAS responded by pushing the nose down. The problem had occurred on the same aircraft during its immediately preceding flight, and the pilots had recovered using a standard checklist for such a "runaway stabilizer" condition. During the accident flight, the AoA sensor again fed erroneous data to the MCAS, which pushed the nose of the aircraft down. The pilots did not properly follow the checklist, with the result that MCAS remained active and repeatedly put the aircraft into an unsafe nose-down position until it crashed into the water.

After the accident, the United States Federal Aviation Administration and Boeing issued warnings and training advisories to all operators of the Boeing 737 MAX series, reminding pilots to follow the runaway stabilizer checklist to avoid letting the MCAS cause similar problems. The company also said that a software update would be made available to update the behavior of MCAS. Despite these advisories, similar issues caused the crash of Ethiopian Airlines Flight 302 on 10 March 2019, prompting a worldwide grounding of all 737 MAX aircraft.

The final report by the National Transportation Safety Committee (NTSC) of Indonesia criticized Boeing's design and the FAA's certification process for MCAS and said the issues were compounded by maintenance issues and lapses by Lion Air's repair crews and its pilots, as well as Xtra Aerospace, a US-based company that supplied Lion Air with the AoA sensor.

== Aircraft and crew ==
The aircraft involved was a Boeing 737 MAX 8, registration PK-LQP, line number 7058, and powered by two CFM International LEAP-1B engines, and was delivered new to Lion Air on 13 August 2018. At the time of the accident, the aircraft had flown about 800 hours in service. This was the first accident involving a 737 MAX since the type's entry into service on 22 May 2017, and the deadliest accident involving a Boeing 737.

The accident aircraft had recently received a replacement angle-of-attack (AoA) sensor. The used replacement sensor was supplied by a US-based company, Xtra Aerospace. Subsequent investigations found that the sensor was likely miscalibrated when sent out by Xtra Aerospace, and that Lion Air’s maintenance crews did not test the sensor before returning the aircraft to service.

The flight's cockpit crew included Captain Bhavye Suneja (31), an Indian national, who had flown with the airline for more than seven years and had about 6,028 hours of flight experience (including 5,176 hours on the Boeing 737) and received his training in California; and First Officer Harvino (41), (Note: Harvino, like some Indonesians, only had a single name - See Indonesian name) an Indonesian who had 5,174 hours of flight experience, 4,286 of them on the Boeing 737. The six flight attendants were also Indonesians.

== Flight details and accident ==
Map showing flight path of Lion Air Flight 610

The aircraft took off from Jakarta on 29 October 2018 at 6:20 am local time (28 October 2018, 11:20 pm UTC) and was scheduled to arrive at Depati Amir Airport in Pangkal Pinang at 7:20 am. It took off in a westward direction before circling around to a northeast heading, which it held until crashing offshore northeast of Jakarta in waters estimated to be as much as 35 m (115 ft) deep. The flight crew had requested clearance to return to the Jakarta airport 19 nmi (35 km; 22 mi) into the flight. The accident site was located 34 km (18 nmi; 21 mi) off the coast of the island of Java.

Communication between air traffic control (ATC) and Flight 610 was suddenly lost at 6:33 am. ATC informed the National Search and Rescue Agency, which deployed three ships and a helicopter to the area. At 7:30 am, the agency received reports that Flight 610 had crashed a few kilometres from an offshore oil platform. Workers on the platform reportedly saw the aircraft crash with a steep nose-down angle. Boats from the platform were immediately deployed and debris from the crashed aircraft was found shortly after.

== Victims ==
On board the aircraft were 189 people: 181 passengers (178 adults, one child, and two infants), as well as six cabin crew and two pilots. All 189 passengers and crew on board were killed.

Among the passengers were 38 civil servants. They consisted of 20 Ministry of Finance employees, 10 Audit Board of Indonesia employees, two auditors from the Finance and Development Inspection Agency, three Ministry of Energy and Mineral Resources employees, and three Indonesian National Police officers. There were also three public prosecutors, six members of Bangka Belitung Regional People's Representative Council members, and three judges of Indonesia's High Court and National Court.

Nationality	Passengers	Crew	Total
Indonesia	180	7	187
Italy	1	0	1
India	0	1	1
Total	181	8	189

Two confirmed foreigners were among those on board: The captain was an Indian citizen named Bhavye Suneja and one passenger was an Italian citizen, former professional cyclist Andrea Manfredi.

== Response ==
On 29 October, Indonesia's Transportation Ministry ordered all of the country's airlines to conduct emergency inspections on their 737 MAX 8 aircraft. The ministry also launched a special audit on Lion Air to see if any problems existed with its management system. The Transportation Ministry announced that all Indonesian Boeing 737 MAX 8 aircraft were airworthy and were allowed to resume normal operations on 31 October.

A Basarnas spokesperson confirmed to reporters that the aircraft had crashed; Muhammad Syaugi, head of Basarnas, later confirmed that casualties had occurred, without specifying a number.

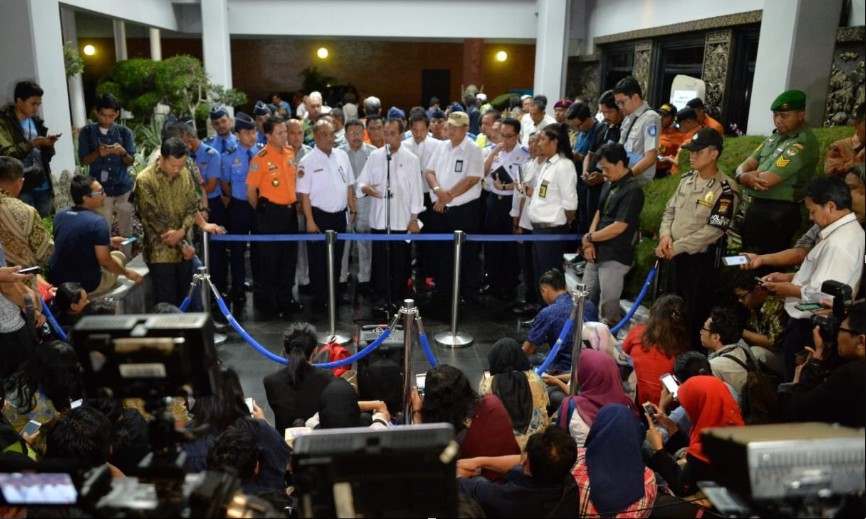
Indonesian minister of transportation Budi Karya Sumadi giving a press conference on the crash of Flight 610

The Transportation Ministry set up crisis centres in Jakarta and Pangkal Pinang. Lion Air offered free flights for the families of the victims to Jakarta. On 30 October, more than 90 relatives were flown to Jakarta for the identification of the victims. Chairman of Lion Air Edward Sirait stated that accommodation had been provided for the relatives, and later added that relatives should go to Halim Perdanakusuma International Airport for further information. The Indonesian National Police announced that a trauma-healing team would be provided for the relatives of the victims.

Indonesia's People's Representative Council announced on 29 October that they would examine the standard operating procedures of Lion Air and the airworthiness of the aircraft. They would also examine the health history of the crew of Flight 610. The speaker of the People's Representative Council, Bambang Soesatyo, later asked the government to enforce stricter rules for the aviation industry and to audit every airliner in the country. On 1 November, Indonesian minister of transportation Budi Karya Sumadi announced that the government would evaluate every low-cost carrier in Indonesia.

As 20 of the passengers were employees of the Indonesian Ministry of Finance, Sri Mulyani, the Indonesian finance minister, immediately visited the Indonesian Search and Rescue Agency's office in Jakarta, seeking coordination and further information. She later announced that Finance Ministry employees should wear a black ribbon for a week to commemorate the victims. Posthumous awards were issued to the 20 victims and scholarships to their children.

Minister of Health Nila F Moeloek and Minister of Transportation Budi Karya Sumadi visited the relatives of the victims. Indonesian President Joko Widodo, who was attending a conference in Bali during the crash, visited the recovery efforts at the Port of Tanjung Priok the next day.

The Australian Department of Foreign Affairs and Trade announced that its staff would be banned from flying on Lion Air, as well as its subsidiary airlines Batik Air and Wings Air, until the cause of the accident was known. The Indonesian minister of transportation, Budi Karya Sumadi, later stated that his ministry would hold talks with the Australian government about the warning.

The government-owned social insurance company Jasa Raharja announced that the victims' families would each receive 50 million rupiah (US$3495) in compensation.

In the immediate aftermath of the crash, the Indonesian media were warned by Indonesian Broadcasting Commission for their unethical coverage of the crash. Some media were accused of pushing the family members to answer unethical questions. Chairman of Indonesia's Alliance of Independent Journalists (AJI), Abdul Manan, stated that images of debris were broadcast repeatedly and inappropriately. This, in turn, traumatized relatives of the victims. In response, some Indonesians voiced their anger and disappointment on social media.

On 31 October, Transportation Minister Budi Karya Sumadi temporarily suspended Lion Air's technical director Muhammad Arif from his duties based on the crash investigation. Budi said the ministry had also suspended an unspecified number of Lion Air technicians who had cleared the aircraft for its final flight.

== Recovery operations ==
Aerial view of Lion Air Flight 610 crash site

Indonesia‘s National Search and Rescue Agency (Basarnas) launched a search-and-rescue operation, with assistance from the Indonesian Air Force, the Indonesian Navy, and the Republic of Singapore Navy. Basarnas dispatched about 150 people in boats and helicopters to the site of the accident. Civilian vessels also responded to the reports of a downed aircraft, and the crew of a tugboat reported to authorities in Tanjung Priok that they had witnessed an aircraft crash at 6:45 am and located debris in the water at 7:15 am. The Indonesian Agency for Assessment and Application for Technology deployed the research ship Baruna Jaya, which had been previously used in the search for Adam Air Flight 574 and Indonesia AirAsia Flight 8501.

Officials from Basarnas announced that the search-and-rescue operation would be conducted for seven days and be extended by three days if needed. A command centre was set up in Tanjung Priok.

On 29 October, the director of operations for Basarnas said that all on board were presumed dead and that the first human remains had been recovered. Divers had located fragments of the aircraft's fuselage and assorted debris, but had yet to find the onboard flight recorders. Air Marshal Muhammad Syaugi, head of Basarnas, suggested that most of the victims were still inside the fuselage, as in the days following the crash rescue personnel only managed to recover a small number of body parts. Poor underwater visibility and strong sea current hampered the search and rescue effort.

On the same day, Basarnas published the area of the search-and-rescue operation, divided into two main areas. The first was a 62 nmi (115 km; 71 mi) long underwater search area, while the second was a "visual search" area, 124 nmi (230 km; 143 mi) wide.

On 30 October, the search area was divided into 13 sectors. The search area was widened to 150 nmi (280 km; 170 mi), reaching as far as Indramayu to the east. Approximately 850 personnel from the National Search and Rescue Agency, National Armed Forces and volunteers participated in the operation. At least 13 bodies were retrieved from the crash site. Indonesian officials confirmed that faint pings had been heard in the search area.

On 31 October, acoustic "pings" were reported to have been detected, no further than 3 km (1.6 nmi; 1.9 mi) from the group of eight current search points, which were possibly from one of the underwater locator beacons (ULBs) attached to the aircraft's flight recorders.

The first victim was identified on 31 October. At the time, more than a dozen body parts had been found by authorities. Some of the parts had drifted more than 5 km (2.7 nmi; 3.1 mi) in the sea current. Police also reported that 152 DNA samples had been collected from the victims' relatives. Hundreds of pieces of the aircraft had also been recovered; all of them were transported to Tanjung Priok, Jakarta. Authorities stated that the search area for dead bodies and debris would be focused in the sea off Karawang Regency, a coastal area of Java close to the crash site, as analysis showed that the sea currents in the area would bring debris to the south. A command centre was set up in Tanjung Pakis, Karawang, to oversee the salvage effort.

On the same day, authorities widened the search area from 10 to 15 nmi (19 to 28 km; 12 to 17 mi). In all, 39 ships (including four equipped with sonar) and 50 divers were deployed to the search area. The National Police announced that 651 personnel had joined and assisted in the search-and-rescue operation. Officials stated that the operation, starting from 31 October, would focus on finding the fuselage of the aircraft and the flight recorders.

The joint search-and-rescue team announced on 31 October that at least three objects, one of which was suspected to be one of the aircraft's wings, were found in the search area. Officials confirmed that "pings" from the aircraft's ULBs were also heard near the area.

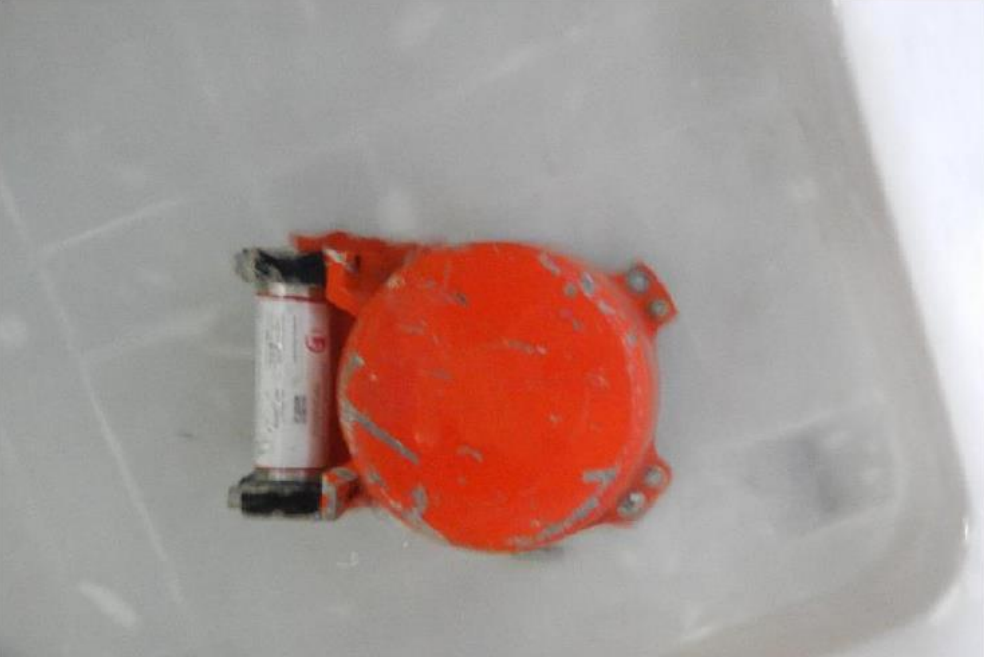
The flight data recorder of Flight 610

On 1 November, searchers recovered Flight 610's flight data recorder (FDR), which was located at a depth of 32 m (105 ft). The cockpit voice recorder (CVR) was reported as not yet found. Haryo Satmiko, deputy chief of National Transportation Safety Committee (NTSC) (Indonesian: Komite Nasional Keselamatan Transportasi), the body investigating the crash, told journalists that the device's poor condition was evidence of the "extraordinary impact" of the crash, which had separated the memory unit from its housing. Despite the damage, investigators were able to recover data from the aircraft's most recent 19 flights spanning 69 hours, and planned to begin analysis on 5 November.

On 2 November, the joint search-and-rescue team deployed more than 850 personnel and 45 vessels to the crash site. The aerial search area was widened to 190 nmi (350 km; 220 mi) and the "underwater search area" was widened to 270 nmi (500 km; 310 mi). Joint search-and-rescue team announced that some engine parts were found in the search area. One of the aircraft's landing gear was recovered in the afternoon. Meanwhile, the Disaster Victim Identification team stated that at least 250 body parts had been recovered from the crash site.

A volunteer rescue diver died during the search on the afternoon of 2 November, likely from decompression sickness.

A second landing gear and both of the aircraft's engines were recovered by search-and-rescue personnel, and the main body of the aircraft was located, 7.5 nmi (13.9 km; 8.6 mi) from the coast of Tanjung Pakis and about 200 m (220 yd) from the location where the FDR was discovered. Divers were immediately dispatched to the area. Faint "pings" from the ULB attached to the aircraft's cockpit voice recorder were also heard.

On 4 November, nearly 1,400 personnel, including 175 divers, were dispatched to the crash site; 69 ships, five helicopters and thirty ambulances were also dispatched. The Head of the National Search and Rescue Agency Muhammad Syaugi announced that the search-and-rescue operation would be extended for another three days.

On 10 November, Basarnas ended its search for victims, but on 22 November, were continuing to search intensively for the CVR.

On 23 November, investigators concluded the victim identification process. Out of 189 people on board, 125 (89 men and 36 women) were identified, including the two foreigners. Another 64 bodies were unaccounted for.

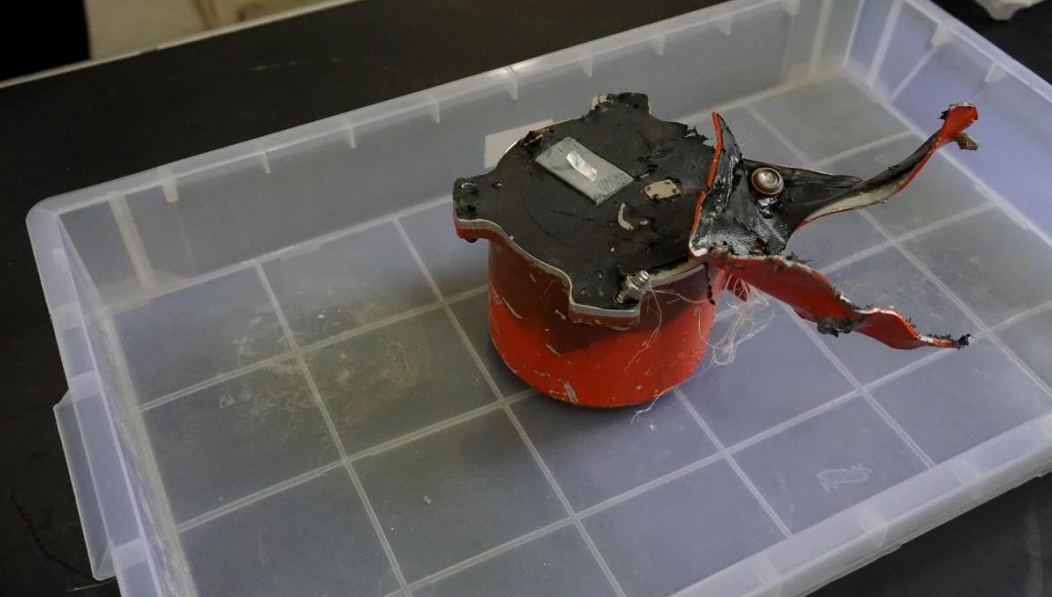
The cockpit voice recorder of Flight 610

Lion Air paid US$2.8 million for a second attempt to search for the CVR between 19 and 29 December, using the offshore supply vessel MPV Everest. Divers detected a signal from an underwater locator beacon coming from underneath the aircraft wreckage and were able to fix the approximate position of the CVR, but did not succeed in recovering it.

The NTSC funded a further underwater search using Indonesian Navy vessel KRI Spica, which started on 8 January 2019 and continued until the CVR was recovered on 14 January. The cockpit voice recorder was found at a depth of 30 m (98 ft) covered by mud that was 8 m (26 ft) thick.

== Investigation ==
=== International assistance ===
The Lion Air aircraft flight recorders were retrieved with assistance from Singapore's Transport Safety Investigation Bureau, which sent on 29 October 2018, three specialists and an underwater locator beacon detector to help recover the devices.

In August 2019, an early draft of the NTSC report was leaked. The report in circulation blamed design and oversight lapses playing a key role in the Lion Air Flight 610 crash and also identified pilot and maintenance errors as causal factors among a hundred elements of the crash chronology, without ranking them. Lion Air expressed objections because NTSC's draft, according to a source who requested anonymity, attributed 25 lapses to Lion Air out of 41 lapses found. Also, doubts arose about the acceptability of some photographs used in the investigation, as they could be fabricated evidence of repair to the doomed Lion Air MAX. The company opposed raising an issue about the photographs in the final accident report.

A Boeing technician and engineering team and a team from the US National Transportation Safety Board arrived on 31 October to help with the investigation being conducted by the NTSC. Personnel from the US Federal Aviation Administration (FAA) and engine manufacturer GE Aviation were also sent to Indonesia. A team from Singapore that had already arrived on the night of 29 October was to provide assistance in recovering the aircraft's flight recorders. The Australian Transport Safety Bureau sent two of its personnel to assist with the downloading process of the FDR.

=== Previous flight problems ===
The aircraft was used on a flight from Ngurah Rai International Airport, Bali, to Soekarno-Hatta International Airport, Jakarta, the night before the crash. Detailed reports from that flight revealed that the aircraft had suffered a serious incident, which left many passengers traumatized. Passengers in the cabin reported heavy shaking and a smell of burnt rubber inside the cabin. At one point, the aircraft had dropped more than 60 m (200 ft) in a few seconds. The seat-belt sign was never turned off from takeoff to landing. A recording of ATC communications indicated that the pilot had called a "pan-pan." The crew later decided to cancel the pan-pan and continue the flight to Jakarta.

The aircraft's maintenance logbook revealed that the aircraft suffered an unspecified navigation failure on the captain's side, while the first officer's side was reported to be in good condition.

Passengers recounted that the aircraft had suffered an engine problem and were told not to board it, as engineers tried to fix the problem. While the aircraft was en route to Jakarta, it had problems maintaining a constant altitude, with passengers stating that it was like "a roller-coaster ride." The chief executive officer of Lion Air, Edward Sirait, said the aircraft had a "technical issue" on Sunday night, but this had been addressed in accordance with maintenance manuals issued by the manufacturer. Engineers had declared that the aircraft was ready for takeoff on the morning of the accident. Information later emerged that a third pilot was on the flight to Jakarta and told the crew to cut electrical power to the stabilizer trim motors. This method is a standard memory item in the 737 checklist and, on this flight, it fixed the problem. Subsequently, the National Transportation Safety Committee confirmed the presence of an off-duty Boeing 737 MAX 8 qualified pilot in the cockpit but did not confirm the role of this person in fixing the problem, and denied that any recording existed of the previous flight in the CVR of Lion Air Flight 610.

=== Early assessment of potential factors ===
The erratic nature of the flight path led Indonesian aviation expert Gerry Soejatman to speculate that the pitot tubes, used in the airspeed indication system, may have played a role in the crash; they had contributed to previous crashes.

The Indonesian Meteorology, Climatology, and Geophysical Agency reported that the weather was clear around the time of the crash, with winds at 9 km/h (5 kn) from the northwest. Visibility was good with no cumulonimbus clouds. Police Hospital Chief Musyafak said that an examination of the body parts indicated that explosion or fire on board the aircraft was unlikely.

=== Flight abnormalities ===
Speed and altitude graph of Flight 610

Aviation experts noted some abnormalities were seen in the altitude and the airspeed of Flight 610. Just three minutes into the flight, the captain asked the controller for permission to return to the airport as the aircraft had flight-control problems. About eight minutes into the flight, data transmitted automatically by the aircraft showed it had descended to about 1,500 m (5,000 ft), but its altitude continued to fluctuate. The mean value of the airspeed data transmitted by Flight 610 was around 300 kn (560 km/h; 350 mph), which was considered by experts to be unusual, as typically aircraft at altitudes lower than 3,000 m (10,000 ft) are restricted to an airspeed of 250 kn (460 km/h; 290 mph). Ten minutes into the flight, the data recorded the aircraft dropping by more than 900 m (3,000 ft). The last recorded altitude of the aircraft was 760 m (2,500 ft).

=== November 2018 findings ===
On 5 November, the NTSC announced that Flight 610 was still intact when it crashed into the sea at high speed, citing the relatively small size of the pieces of debris. The impact was so powerful that the strongest part of the aircraft was obliterated. The NTSC also stated that the engines of Flight 610 were still running when it crashed into the sea, indicated by high engine speed. Further examination of the aircraft's instruments revealed that one of the aircraft's airspeed indicators had malfunctioned for its last four flights, including the flight to Denpasar.

On 7 November, the NTSC confirmed that problems had occurred with Flight 610's AoA sensors on the third and fourth last flight before the crash. Thinking that it would fix the problem, the engineers in Bali then replaced one of the aircraft's AoA sensors, but the problem persisted on the penultimate flight, from Denpasar to Jakarta. Just minutes after takeoff, the aircraft abruptly dived. The crew of that flight, however, had controlled the aircraft by following inflight procedures and decided to fly at a lower-than-normal altitude. They then managed to land the aircraft safely and recorded a 20° difference between the readings of the left and the right AoA sensors. NTSC chief Soerjanto Tjahjono told the press that future reporting or actions, enacted to prevent similar problems on similar aircraft, would be decided by Boeing and U.S. aviation authorities.

On 28 November, Indonesia investigators said the Lion Air jet was not airworthy on the flight before the crash. Several relatives of the crash victims filed lawsuits against Boeing.

=== Preliminary report ===
On 28 November, the Indonesian NTSC released its preliminary accident investigation report. After airspeed and altitude problems, an AoA sensor was replaced and tested two days earlier on the accident aircraft. Erroneous airspeed indications were still present on the subsequent flight on 28 October, which experienced automatic nose-down trim. The runaway stabilizer non-normal checklist was run, the electric stabilizer trim was turned off, and the flight continued with manual trim; the issues were reported after landing. Shortly after takeoff on 29 October, issues involving altitude and airspeed continued due to erroneous AoA data and commanded automatic nose-down trim via the MCAS. The flight crew repeatedly commanded nose-up trim over the final ten minutes of the flight. The preliminary report did not state whether the runaway stabilizer trim procedure was run or whether the electric stabilizer trim switches were cut out on the accident flight.

Leeham News, which principally covers Airbus, Boeing, Bombardier, and Embraer issues, reported that the crew did not have a clear knowledge that trim runaway checklist will disengage MCAS.

Boeing pointed to the successful troubleshooting conducted on 28 October as evidence that the MCAS did not change runaway stabilizer procedures, and emphasised the longstanding existence of procedures to cancel MCAS nose-down commands.

=== Cockpit voice recorder ===
The CVR was found on 14 January 2019. On 21 January 2019, the NTSC announced that it would not release transcript from the CVR until the final report was released. Following the Ethiopian Airlines Flight 302 crash on 10 March 2019, however, the data from the CVR of the Lion Air Flight 610 were shared among the investigators; media citing anonymous sources reported that the CVR recorded the pilots mentioning several problems, trying to climb, and checking the quick-reference handbook for a solution. NTSC denied these claims, but stated the pilots began to panic at the end of the flight.

=== Final report ===
The NTSC released its final report into the accident on 25 October 2019. The report listed nine "Contributing Factors":

Contributing factors [are] define[d] as actions, omissions, events, conditions, or a combination thereof, which, if eliminated, avoided or absent, would have reduced the probability of the accident or incident occurring, or mitigated the severity of the consequences of the accident or incident. The presentation is based on chronological order and not to show the degree of contribution.

1. During the design and certification of the Boeing 737-8 (MAX), assumptions were made about flight-crew response to malfunctions that, even though consistent with current industry guidelines, turned out to be incorrect.

2. Based on the incorrect assumptions about flight-crew response and an incomplete review of associated multiple flight deck effects, MCAS's reliance on a single sensor was deemed appropriate and met all certification requirements.

3. MCAS was designed to rely on a single AoA sensor, making it vulnerable to erroneous input from that sensor.

4. The absence of guidance on MCAS or more detailed use of trim in the flight manuals and in-flight crew training, made it more difficult for flight crews to properly respond to uncommanded MCAS.

5. The AoA DISAGREE alert was not correctly enabled during Boeing 737-8 (MAX) development. As a result, it did not appear during flight with the miscalibrated AoA sensor, could not be documented by the flight crew, and was therefore not available to help maintenance identify the miscalibrated AoA sensor.

6. The replacement AoA sensor that was installed on the accident aircraft had been miscalibrated during an earlier repair. This miscalibration was not detected during the repair.

7. The investigation could not determine that the installation test of the AoA sensor was performed properly. The miscalibration was not detected.

8. Lack of documentation in the aircraft flight and maintenance log about the continuous stick shaker and use of the runaway stabilizer NNC meant that information was not available to the maintenance crew in Jakarta, nor was it available to the accident crew, making it more difficult for each to take the appropriate actions.

9. The multiple alerts, repetitive MCAS activations, and distractions related to numerous ATC communications were not able to be effectively managed. This was caused by the difficulty of the situation and performance in manual handling, NNC execution, and flight-crew communication, leading to ineffective CRM application and workload management. These performances had previously been identified during training and reappeared during the accident flight.

— Source: Komite Nasional Keselamatan Transportasi (KNKT; English: NTSC), "Aircraft Accident Investigation Report" (Abbreviations: ATC = Air Traffic Control; NNC = Non-Normal Checklists; CRM = Crew Resource Management)

The report stated that 31 pages were missing from the airplane's logbook. The NTSC recommended that Lion Air improve the duration and content of its safety management system training, including the identification of equipment hazards, such as the continuous stick shaker and trim runaway, which the pilot on the previous flight did not report. The Indonesian Directorate General of Civil Aviation was urged to improve its oversight of airlines and maintenance organizations.

== Aftermath ==
=== Reaction ===
==== Potential cause ====
The CFM LEAP engines used on the 737 MAX have a higher bypass ratio and have a larger nacelle than the engines of previous Boeing 737 models, requiring them to be placed further forward and upwards on the wing compared to previous models. This de-stabilises the aircraft pitch at high AoAs due to a change in aerodynamics.

The MCAS was designed to mitigate this aerodynamics issue in the 737 MAX series, automatically commanding the aircraft to pitch downwards if its AoA was too high, but out of two AoA sensors on the aircraft, MCAS would only read data from a single sensor. Former Boeing engineers expressed the opinion that a nose-down command triggered by a sensor single point of failure is a design flaw if the crew is not prepared, and the FAA was evaluating a fix of the possible flaw and investigating whether the pilots' transition training is adequate. A malfunction in the captain-side AoA sensor, as occurred on the flight, caused the MCAS system to continuously trim the aircraft nose-down, causing the plane to crash.

==== FAA warnings ====
On 7 November, on the basis of preliminary information gathered in the investigation of the Lion Air accident, the US FAA issued an emergency airworthiness directive requiring that amended operating limitations and procedures relating to erroneous data from an AoA sensor be inserted into the aircraft flight manual of each 737 MAX aircraft, and urged all airlines operating Boeing 737 MAX 8s to heed the warnings.

Flight 610 Crash site

On 25 October 2019, after the release of the Final Report by NTSC, the FAA revoked the repair certification of Florida-based Xtra Aerospace LLC, which fixed an AoA sensor suspected of contributing to the crash.

==== Pilot concerns ====
During difference training, pilots of American Airlines and Southwest Airlines converting from earlier Boeing 737 Next Generation models to the 737 MAX were not informed of the MCAS linked to the fatal crash, leaving them concerned that they were possibly untrained with respect to other differences. In November 2018, Aviation Week reviewed the 737 MAX flight-crew operations manual and found that it did not mention the MCAS. American Airlines' Allied Pilots Association and Southwest Airlines Pilots' Association were also caught unaware. The Wall Street Journal reported that Boeing had "decided against disclosing more details to cockpit crews due to concerns about inundating average pilots with too much information."

On 15 November, the Air Line Pilots Association in the United States, representing 61,000 pilots, urged the FAA and NTSB to ensure pilots receive all relevant information addressing a "potential, significant aviation system safety deficiency." The association's United Airlines branch, in line with its management, disagreed as the 737 pilot manual includes a standard procedure to shut down the flight-control behavior, and dismissed the MCAS implication in the accident as "speculation" based on the Boeing safety-warning bulletin and the follow-on FAA airworthiness directive.

==== Boeing's defense ====
In an internal message on 19 November 2018, Boeing CEO Dennis Muilenburg defended the flight-crew operations manual as describing the relevant function of MCAS. On 20 November, Boeing was to hold a conference call with 737 MAX operators to detail the new MCAS not present in the Next Generation models. The conference call was cancelled later, to be replaced by a series of regional calls to allow more questions.

On 25 October 2019, after the release of the final investigation report by NTSC, Boeing President and CEO Dennis Muilenburg responded:

"We are addressing the KNKT's [NTSC's] safety recommendations, and taking actions to enhance the safety of the 737 MAX to prevent the flight control conditions that occurred in this accident from ever happening again. Safety is an enduring value for everyone at Boeing and the safety of the flying public, our customers, and the crews aboard our airplanes is always our top priority. We value our long-standing partnership with Lion Air and we look forward to continuing to work together in the future."

In January 2020, newly released unredacted Boeing employee internal messages revealed that they had mocked Lion Air with profanity and belittled the airline for requesting additional simulator training for their Boeing 737 MAX pilots in 2017, citing that Lion's sister airline (Malindo Air) had already operated the type of aircraft. Lion Air co-founder and former CEO Rusdi Kirana, currently the Indonesian ambassador to Malaysia, considered cancelling Lion Air's outstanding 190 Boeing aircraft orders – worth some $22 billion at list prices – over what he viewed as an attempt by Boeing to blame Lion Air for the crash.

==== Legal action ====
On 31 December 2018, the family of the first officer filed a lawsuit against Boeing, claiming negligence. The lawsuit also claimed that the aircraft's sensors provided inaccurate flight data, causing its antistall system to improperly engage, as well as Boeing not providing proper instructions to pilots about how to handle the situation.

In March 2019, victims' families reported irregularities, saying that Lion Air pressured them into signing away their rights to seek legal recourse for minimal compensation.

In October 2019, the US Federal Aviation Administration revoked the aviation repair station certificate for Xtra Aerospace, the company that supplied the faulty AoA sensor to Lion Air. The certificate revocation effectively put Xtra Aerospace out of business.

In December 2020, a federal judge in Chicago froze the assets of attorney Thomas Girardi, as "finding that he misappropriated at least US$2 million in client funds that were due to the families of those killed in the crash". He was disbarred from legal practice and ordered to return US$2.3 million in funds.

=== Second accident and grounding ===
On 10 March 2019, another 737 MAX 8, operated by Ethiopian Airlines (registration ET-AVJ), crashed shortly after takeoff from Addis Ababa; all 157 people on board perished. This raised further concerns about the safety of the 737 MAX and culminated in all 737 MAX aircraft being grounded worldwide for 21 months.

== Dramatization ==
- The accident was dramatized in the 21st season of the TV series Mayday in an episode entitled "Grounded: Boeing Max 8" and was briefly mentioned in the 24th season in an episode entitled "Deadly Directive".
- In February 2022, Netflix released Downfall: The Case Against Boeing, a documentary about the Lion Air Flight 610 and Ethiopian Airlines Flight 302 plane crashes.

== See also ==
- List of accidents and incidents involving the Boeing 737
- List of aviation accidents and incidents in Indonesia
- List of accidents and incidents involving commercial aircraft
- List of aircraft accidents and incidents resulting in at least 50 fatalities
