= Sinking of MV Dumai Express 10 =

2009 maritime incident in Indonesia

Coordinates: 1.191°N 103.352°E

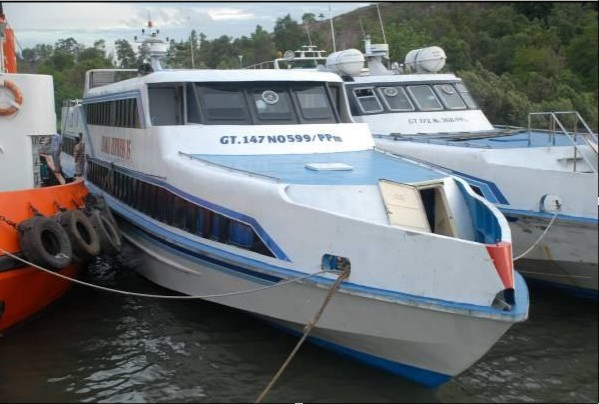
- MV Dumai Express 15, sister ship to the accident vessel
- Date: 22 November 2009; 16 years ago
- Time: 09:28 - 09:55 (UTC+7)
- Location: Off the coast of Iyu Kecil, Karimun Regency, Riau Islands, Indonesia
- Cause: Structural failure of the superstructure leading to the presence of large amount of water on the deck
- Outcome: Sank near Karimun, Riau Islands; 254 survivors found; 42 bodies recovered; 33 missing and presumed dead
- Deaths: 42 confirmed
- Missing: 33 (presumed dead)

The sinking of MV Dumai Express 10 occurred on the morning of 22 November 2009 when a ferry carrying more than 300 people sank near the island of Iyu Kecil in Karimun Regency, Riau Islands during bad weather. Eyewitnesses reported that massive waves had struck the ferry repeatedly, causing the starboard side of the ship to crack. Subsequently, a considerable amount of water poured onto the deck. By 9:55 a.m. the ferry was fully submerged.

Search and rescue personnel were deployed to the area. More than 250 survivors were found. 42 bodies were discovered in the following days and 33 were still missing. Those who are listed as missing are presumed to have died in the accident. The accident is the second major ferry disaster in Indonesia in 2009. Earlier in the year, a ferry carrying more than 300 people capsized during bad weather in Majene, West Sulawesi, and more than 300 were killed in the disaster.

The accident was investigated by the National Transportation Safety Committee. The investigation revealed that the superstructure's front wall of the ferry was insufficient to counter-act the force of the waves. The wave struck the ferry repeatedly and subsequently damaged the front wall. As it was cracked by the waves, water entered the main deck. As the deck flooded, the ferry lost its ability to float.

== Sinking ==
Dumai Express 10 regularly operated a ferry service from the city of Batam, Riau Islands to Dumai, Riau with a stopover in Karimun Regency. It was a daily service and the trip usually took about 7 – 8 hours. The ferry had 3 decks and a capacity of at least 250 passengers and crew. On 22 November 2009, at 08:05 local time (UTC+7), the ferry departed Sekupang Ferry Terminal with 329 passengers and crew. The weather at the time was still in good condition.

The ferry was cruising at a speed of 26 knots (48 km/h; 30 mph). The ferry then arrived at an area called Karang Banteng at 08:23 local time and the Captain then changed the heading of the ferry. At 08:44, the ferry reached Nipah Island. Several minutes later, after it had passed Nipah Island, the weather deteriorated and the waves became higher, with an estimated height of 2.5–4 metres (8.2–13.1 ft). Windspeed reached 22 knots (41 km/h; 25 mph). The owner of the ferry told the captain to continue to Dumai.

At 09:28 local time, huge waves slammed the ferry repeatedly. The sound of a crack near the bridge was heard. A crew member ordered by the captain to check the origin of the sound, spotted a crack on the front wall and water had rushed into the passenger area. Passengers who noticed this started to panic. The crew member reported his observation to the Captain. The Captain then changed the heading of the ferry and turned the ferry to the island of Iyu Kecil.

Huge waves struck the ferry repeatedly from the front, causing large quantity of water to enter the passenger area. The water entered the deck from the air conditioning shaft. Due to the large amount of water, the ferry started to tilt to its portside and its bow started to sink. The stern started to rise. The captain decided to stop the ferry and began to evacuate the passengers. As the ferry sank further, eyewitness stated that the crack on the wall burst and a large amount of water immediately rushed to the passenger area.

The ferry had three decks, mainly the main deck (main passenger area), the lower deck, and the upper deck (VIP area). The water initially flooded the main deck, then later flooded the lower deck causing the ferry to list. Passengers in panic rushed to the door, causing the ferry to list more. Most people rushed to the ferry's stern (the back), which was raised due to the sinking of the bow. Many people had to crawl and hold onto the seats as the ferry listed severely. According to survivors, several people on the front part of the lower deck were unable to escape due to the angle of the list and the large amount of water. Several children had lost their grips from their parents due to the panic. Several passengers smashed the side windows to escape while others immediately jumped into the water although the crew never finished inflating the lifeboats. The bad weather condition severely hampered the evacuation process.

At 09:55, Dumai Express 10 was fully submerged and sank.

== Search and rescue ==
First report was received by officials at around 10:30 local time. Indonesian National Search and Rescue Agency immediately deployed 5 patrol ships to the area. Ferries and other fishing boats joined the rescue effort. 180 survivors were rescued while 1 body was recovered by rescue team. At the time, 59 people were still listed as missing. The evacuation was slow due to bad weather in the area. Crisis centre was set up in Dumai. On the evening of 22 November, 18 bodies were recovered from the sea. Among the dead bodies were two infants. 261 were able to be rescued from the sea. As of 22 November, the death toll was at 22.

On 23 November, Indonesian National Search and Rescue Agency reported that 30 people were killed and dozens were listed as missing. Among the dead was the owner of the ferry, Boheng, who was also the head of PT. Lestari Indomas Bahari, the company that operated the ferry. Passengers recalled that the last time they saw him he was giving his lifejacket to a passenger who was pleading for help. The Central Crisis Centre in Karimun had prepared hundreds of body bags. The house of the regent of Karimun Regency Nurdin Basirun was used as a temporary shelter for the survivors and as a crisis centre. 14 ships, including 3 military ships, and helicopter were dispatched to the area. However, the weather in the area was still in adverse condition. Huge waves hampered the search and rescue effort. The propeller of a Search and Rescue ship got damaged after being struck by high waves in the area. Officials stated that several additional body bags were retrieved from Karimun Regional Hospital and Karimun Harbour. The number of survivors were revised to 255. One body was repatriated to Riau.

On 25 November, officials deployed 21 units of ship, including 4 military ships, to the area. The Indonesian Navy and Indonesian Customs joined the search and rescue operation. The search and rescue effort was still hampered by rough waves. 14 bodies were repatriated to Dumai and 105 survivors were returned to Batam. Officials stated that 5 bodies had been recovered from the sea.

On 28 November, the search and rescue operation was stopped by the Indonesian National Search and Rescue Agency. Officials stated that 40 bodies were found during the operation, while 35 people were still missing.

== Salvage ==
After the discontinuation of the search and rescue operation, relatives of the missing pleaded to officials to resume rescue effort. They asked rescuers to find the wreckage of the sunken ferry and search for more bodies, as they believed that most of the missing were trapped inside. Members of the rescue team then started an operation to locate the wreckage. Planes and ships equipped with sonar were deployed to the area.

On 2 December, at 16:00 local time, the wreckage of the ferry was located by KRI Pulau Romang, an Indonesian military ship. The wreckage was at a depth of 40 meters and was about 2 kilometers from the location of the sinking. Divers were sent to the area. They managed to retrieve two more bodies from the wreckage, bringing the death toll to 42. However, 33 people were still missing. Several relatives of the victims asked authorities to recover the sunken ferry.

== Passengers and crew ==
There were confusion on the number of the passengers and crew aboard the ferry. An Indonesian health official indicated that the ship was carrying 291 people; although the ferry had a capacity of 273, overloading is common. Captain Johan Napitupulu denied that the ferry was overcrowded and indicated that they had no warning of a storm at the time of departure. The passenger manifest indicated that 228 passengers were aboard the ferry. Subsequent investigation revealed that the ferry was also carrying passengers with no tickets. 20 infants and 7 children were confirmed to be aboard. Officials stated that 13 crew members were aboard, later finalizing the number of the total passengers and crew aboard to 329.

A criminal investigation was launched by the police. On 24 November, a press conference was held by the Ministry of Transportation. They mentioned about the overloading issue and warned officials who were responsible for it would be fired or disciplined. There were reports that officials from the harbour accepted money from passengers so the passengers could board the ferry that had been loaded nearly its maximum capacity. Members of the NTSC added that the case of the sinking might be handed over to the Indonesian Court of Shipping.

== Investigation ==
The National Transportation Safety Committee stated that it will investigate on the operation of the ferry, the crew performance and the design and construction of the ferry.

=== Cracks in the superstructure ===
Multiple witnesses stated that water entered the passenger area through cracks that had been formed by the strong rough waves. Investigators stated that cracks were located near the bridge. Divers who checked the wreckage confirmed that cracks had formed on the superstructure's front wall. Since there was no drainage on the bridge area of the main deck, the water flooded the area. The flooding of the main deck caused the ferry to lose its ability to float due to free surface effect. The bow also started to sink and the ferry started to list to its portside.

Construction workers stated that the superstructure's front wall of the ferry was using FRP, with a fiber thickness of 8 fiber layers. The wall of the bow was reinforced with some sturdy blocks. Calculation conducted by investigators revealed that the blocks were insufficient to hold the structural integrity of the superstructure. Investigators stated that the since the superstructure was built with FRP materials, the superstructure was prone to impact load. Prior to the sinking, the ferry was travelling at a speed of approximately 26 knots. As it was travelling against the waves, the force of the waves was powerful enough to tear the superstructure. Eyewitness confirmed that the force was so strong that a television, which was placed behind the wall, fell to the floor due to the impact.

Investigators stated that typically, a fiber layer was accompanied with resin and catalyst. If the proportion between resin and catalyst was high, then the superstructures would become brittle. Inspection on the wreckage showed that the catalyst on the fiber was higher than the amount of resin, confirming the investigators that the 4 mm thick front wall was easily breakable.

=== Water in the ferry ===
Investigators noted that the forecastle deck of Dumai Express 10 was an open deck and surrounded by bulwark. Water could not drain back into the sea, instead was trapped on deck. Continuous impact by the waves weakened the wall, causing a hole to form. The water then leaked into the air conditioning shaft, flooding the front portion of the main passenger area. When it reached the non-weatherproof access port of the cargo compartment near the shaft, the water drained into the cargo compartment.

=== Poor crew professionalism ===
Had the captain of the ferry discontinued the journey to Dumai, the disaster would have been averted. Investigators noted that the captain was experienced enough to recognize that the weather at the time was unsuitable for a ferry to operate. Further investigations revealed that he had not followed the correct procedure for an onboard emergency. The captain should have issued to the authorities on land a distress signal.

Testimonies collected from survivors revealed that crew response was uncoordinated resulting in poor crowd control and uncontained panic. There were no instructions from the crew on how to react during the emergency. Several passengers took their own initiatives. Passengers started to smash the windows and others immediately jumped onto the sea.

The crew should have also conducted damage control on the ferry. Survivors stated that the crew never attempted to decrease the volume of water or at least try to fix the problem. Investigators noted that the crew were insufficiently trained to deal with such a situation. The crew insufficiently understand the emergency procedure due to their high roster time. The company insufficiently supervised the crew or implement proper safety regulations monitoring.

== See also ==
- Sinking of MV Sinar Bangun
