= KAL Legian =

History

Indonesia
- Name: KAL Legian
- Status: Unknown

KAL Legian is an Indonesian naval vessel.

== Notable deployments ==
Legian and KRI Cobra helped recover 22 of the bodies of the deceased from the Levina 1.
