= KRI Cobra =

Indonesian naval vessel

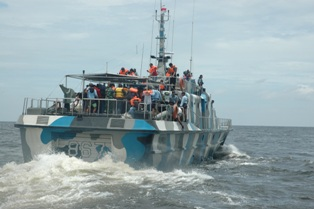

History

Indonesia
- Name: KAL Cobra
- Status: Unknown

KRI Kobra, is an Indonesian naval vessel of the Waigeo class patrol boats.

== Notable deployments ==
Cobra and KAL Legian helped recover 22 of the bodies of the deceased from the Levina 1.
