= Sinking of MV Teratai Prima =

2009 maritime incident in Indonesia

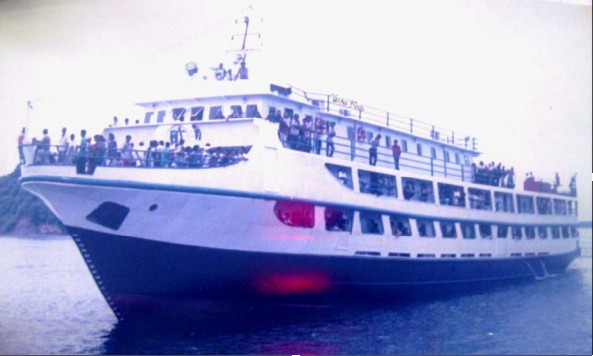
- MV Teratai Prima prior to its sinking
- Date: 11 January 2009; 17 years ago
- Time: Around 04:00 a.m local time (UTC+8)
- Location: Batu Roro, Makassar Strait, Majene, West Sulawesi, Indonesia; 03°27′00″S 118°47′00″E
- Cause: Overloading; Inclement weather; Flooding on the engine compartment
- Outcome: Capsized in Makassar Strait
- Deaths: 9 confirmed
- Injuries: 35
- Missing: 321 (presumed dead)
- Suspects: Sabir bin Andae, Captain
- Charges: Negligence
- Verdict: 9 years in prison

The sinking of MV Teratai Prima occurred on 11 January 2009, around 04:00 local time (January 10, 21:00 UTC) when a ferry carrying more than 300 people capsized in the Makassar Strait off West Sulawesi, Survivors stated that the ferry had been slammed by 4-metre (13 ft) waves twice. The first one hit so hard that the ship became unbalanced (witnesses said the angle approached 30 degrees), before another wave hit from a different direction and sank the vessel.

Indonesian officials stated that more than 300 people were aboard the sunken ferry. In the following days, 35 survivors were evacuated from the site of the sinking. More than 300 people were listed as missing, all of them were presumed dead. With the deaths of more than 300 people, the sinking is regarded as the deadliest maritime disaster in Indonesia since the sinking of MV Senopati Nusantara in 2006.

The National Transportation Safety Committee published the final report. The investigation found that the ferry was overloaded during the sinking. The Captain had also ignored warnings of bad weather from officials of the local meteorological agency. Further investigation revealed that during the disaster, water rushed into the engine compartment. The investigation also revealed that the cargo were not properly loaded so the center of gravity of the ferry had shifted. The ferry lost its stability and capsized to its side.

== Sinking ==
MV Teratai Prima was a passenger and cargo ferry vessel that operated a regular, scheduled inter-island service between Pare-Pare, South Sulawesi and Samarinda, the capital of East Kalimantan, Borneo. The ferry departed from Pare-Pare Harbour at 19:00 WITA (UTC+8), carrying 365 passengers and crew along with cargo, mostly rice, weighing around 443 tonnes (443,000 kg; 977,000 lb). The weather when the vessel departed Pare-Pare was still in acceptable condition, with drizzle reportedly present.

At around 02:00 local time, the crew of Teratai Prima communicated to the ferry-service dispatchers in Pare-Pare that the vessel had been hit by a tornado. This was the last recorded transmission from the ferry.

At 04:00 local time, MV Teratai Prima reached an area named Batu Roro. By now, weather conditions had become adverse, with waves reportedly reaching a height of 3–4 metres (9.8–13.1 ft). Data from local radar showed that the ferry was in stormy weather. As waves hit the vessel repeatedly, it started to sway, then began to list to its side, attaining an angle of 30 degrees. As another wave hit the ferry, it immediately capsized onto its starboard side.

Survivors stated that most of the passengers were asleep inside the passenger deck at the time the capsizing occurred, upon which the ferry immediately sank. Since the disaster occurred in a timespan of less than 5 minutes, most of the passengers would have had insufficient time to react, and the vessel sank with more than 300 persons trapped inside.

== Search and rescue ==
As contact had been lost, search-and-rescue personnel were dispatched to the area. The first reported finding came from a fisherman in the vicinity. In the immediate hours following the disaster, numerous ships and fishing boats arrived at the site of the disaster, located to the south of Majene, West Sulawesi. At least 18 survivors were found and were transported to Majene. The Indonesian National Army dispatched aircraft and ships to the area. However, the rescue operation was hampered by the persisting adverse weather conditions. Many ships were instructed to leave the area, while several others were told to remain.

Crisis centers were set up in Samarinda. Relatives of the passengers on board the ferry were immediately contacted by authorities. There was confusion among the relatives, as the names of their loved ones were not on the list of the passenger manifest. According to officials, many passengers were not listed therein. It listed 250 passengers and crew-members aboard the ferry; reports however stated that 357 persons had been aboard.

Over the course of the first day, 17 survivors were found by search-and-rescue personnel. Personnel from the Indonesian Navy, Indonesian Air Force, Indonesian Armed Forces and the Indonesian National Police were called to assist the search and rescue. The survivors were taken to Pare-Pare.

On 12 January, officials stated that the ferry was lying at a depth of 500 metres (1,600 ft), 3 miles (3 nmi; 5 km) from the coast of Majene - in actuality, as they would state on 19 January, it lay much deeper. They added that the location of the sinking was around 6 miles (5 nmi; 10 km) from the crash site of Adam Air Flight 574. 108 personnel were deployed. Lack of equipment and navigation errors further hampered the search operation. They reported that another 6 survivors had been found.

On 14 January, Indonesian Vice-President Jusuf Kalla stated that the Indonesian state-owned oil and natural gas corporation, Pertamina, was to join the search-and-rescue operation.

On 17 January, the Head of the Indonesian National Search and Rescue Agency, Ida Bagus Sanubari, ordered that the search-and-rescue operation be extended a further three days.

On 19 January, officials stated that 44 victims had been found, 35 of them alive and 9 dead, and that more than 300 passengers and crew-members were still missing. They added that helicopters, military ships and planes were deployed to search for the missing passengers and crews and that the wreckage of the ferry was approximately at a depth of 1,040 metres (3,412 ft). A memorial service to commemorate the deceased victims was held by the families.

As by now no further bodies were being recovered from the sea, the search-and-rescue operation was called off by officials on 20 January. Relatives gathered at the site of the sinking and threw flowers onto the sea.

== Investigation ==
Minister of Transportation Jusman Safeii Djamal stated that members of the National Transportation Safety Board would arrive in Majene to investigate the disaster.

=== Conditions during the sinking ===
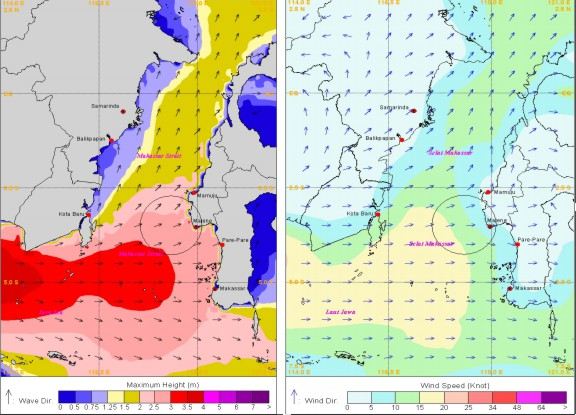
Radar image of the area where MV. Teratai Prima sank. The photo on the left shows the wave height while on the right shows the wind speed at the time of the sinking.

During a press conference on 12 January, Minister of Transportation Jusman Safeii Djamal stated that the ferry encountered severe weather conditions near Majene. On the testimony of the captain, the ferry capsized as waves hit the ferry from the right side. The minister questioned the captain's decision to continue to Samarinda, despite having been forewarned by officials from the local meteorological agency about the presence of bad weather, later adding that the captain should have canceled the service on that day.

Radar images of the area confirmed that weather conditions at the time the disaster occurred were poor. The head of the Indonesian Agency for Meteorology, Climatology and Geophysics, Sri Woro B Hardjono, stated that a cyclone-like phenomenon had occurred at that time in the vicinity of the ferry. Winds were recorded at a speed of 84 km/h (45 kn; 52 mph)., whereas the officially stipulated maximum windspeed for safe operating of ships is 56 km/h (30 kn; 35 mph). Waves were estimated to be around 3–4 metres (9.8–13.1 ft) in the area. The area of the sinking is itself regarded as a challenging area as whirlpools are frequently spotted by sailors.

=== Overloading ===
Investigators were unable to find the ferry's loading chart, making it impossible to accurately determine the total weight of the vessel. Their inspection of the passenger manifest revealed discrepancies as to the true number of passengers and crew-members aboard. Consequently, calculating of its weight had to be based on assumptions. The crew noted that the cargo weighed around 443 tonnes and that there were 365 passengers on board. Calculating on the basis of the two combined weights revealed that the ferry had been overloaded to as much as 200% of its actual capacity.

The investigators examined several plausible scenarios to account for the accident's probable cause. In one such scenario, weather conditions in the vicinity were of themselves sufficiently severe to easily cause the ferry to sink. According to an alternative scenario that the investigators finally agreed upon, the ferry was fully loaded with cargo and passengers and crew-members. Owing to that, the freeboard of the vessel became small and, given its design, water would readily have entered it.

=== Free surface effect ===
As the consequence of the vessel's freeboard having become reduced, water could easily have entered the hull from the left side, flooding the deck. The 20-centimetre-tall (7.9 in) hatch, consisting of a wooden board, was damaged as waves with heights of 3–4 metres struck the ferry. The engine compartment was flooded and the free surface effect occurred on board.

== Criminal proceeding ==
On 19 January, the ferry's captain, Sarbi bin Andae, was named by the police as a suspect in the sinking. He was accused of negligence and liable to serve a prison sentence of at least 5 years. On 10 August 2009, the District court of Pare-Pare sentenced Sarbi to 9 years in prison.

== See also ==
- Sinking of MV Sinar Bangun
- Sinking of MV Dumai Express 10
- Tampomas II, Indonesia's deadliest maritime disaster
