= MV Levina 1 =

- A fireboat dousing down the burnt-out hulk of the ferry

History
- Name: MV Levina 1
- Owner: PT Praga Jaya Sentosa
- Identification: IMO number: 8001309
- Fate: Caught on fire and sank in February 2007

General characteristics
- Type: Ferry
- Tonnage: 2,000

Levina 1 was an Indonesian passenger ferry. On 22 February 2007, it caught fire on the Java Sea, killing at least 51 people. Three days later, on 25 February, it sank with a group of journalists and investigators on board, killing at least one more and leaving three missing.

== Construction ==
The Levina 1 was a 2,000-ton vessel built in Japan in 1980. It was owned and operated by PT Praga Jaya Sentosa.

== Fire ==
On February 22, 2007, the Levina 1 was en route from the Indonesian capital, Jakarta, to the island of Bangka. The vessel caught fire several hours after leaving port, prior to dawn, at a location 60 nautical miles (110 km; 70 mi) from the start port of Tanjung Priok. Hundreds of passengers escaped the burning ship by jumping into the Java Sea. Over 290 people had to be rescued. At least 51 people were killed in the disaster, but the Indonesian Red Cross says the number of deaths could be as high as 89. The ship's log claimed the ship was carrying 228 passengers, 42 trucks and eight cars, but the navy claims it had at least 350 passengers on board. It is common for logs of passengers to be left incomplete and boats to be overloaded in Indonesia. In reference to the incomplete manifest, Transport Minister Hatta Rajasa said: "It is a big mistake that the ferry company never registered the identity of children passengers. It is a big, big mistake. I am going to give them heavy sanctions for that."

=== Rescue effort ===
The ferry's sister ship, Levina II, rescued many passengers, as did the Filipino ship Princess Vanessa. In total, two warships (KRI Cobra and KAL Legian), three helicopters, a tug boat and nine cargo ships participated in the search and rescue operation. The injured were either transported straight to hospital, or treated at a makeshift centre set up at the port. 60 people were able to swim to a nearby island.

== Sinking ==
After the fire had been extinguished, tugboat TB Jayakarta III towed the ship into the waters of Tanjung Priok on February 24. The following day, a party of four investigators and twelve journalists were taken to the ship by a police boat. The reporters came from the Indosiar, Metro TV, ANTV, tvOne (at the time still known as Lativi) and SCTV TV networks and the Elshinta radio networks. Many of those who boarded did not put on lifevests; although they had been available, the police had not made them mandatory. The ferry was still under tow at the time, being seven nautical miles (13 km; 8.1 mi) from the port itself. It was already listing slightly prior to the party boarding the wreck, and the group had been previously warned the ferry wasn't safe. The Indonesian investigative authority, the KNKT, had not given the group permission to board, but they saw other journalists on board, and followed suit. Once on board the hulk, the journalists went to deck three where they interviewed the head of the city's Water Police, Adj. Sr. Comr. Frederik Kalembang. Shortly after the party boarded the vessel, it suddenly listed sharply. Police officers monitoring the vessel from a nearby boat used a loudspeaker to order an immediate evacuation of the ship. Most of those on board rushed down to deck two, where they escaped via a window at the end of the deck. The ship sank within five minutes. One six-man lifeboat nearly capsized due to being heavily overloaded. One Lativi cameraman subsequently died in hospital, and three other people – two police forensics officers and a SCTV cameraman – remain unaccounted for. Four more people were seriously injured. Diving operations on the wreck failed to locate the bodies of the deceased.

== Investigation ==
An investigation was launched after the twin disasters by the National Transportation Safety Committee and the Police Forensic Laboratory. The investigation established that the fire started in a truck on the car deck. It is believed to have been a chemical fire, as the ship's crew reported that when they attempted to douse the tarpaulin-covered truck with water, the ferocity of the fire increased. The trucker's ticketing agency shows that one of the trucks was loaded with cases of premixed petroleum, a rare and expensive commodity in Indonesia. The ship's captain was interviewed as part of the investigative procedure. Preliminary reports suggest that negligence on the part of the operator, PT Praga Jaya Sentosa, contributed to the disaster. The investigation revealed that no inspection of the boat's documents was conducted prior to departure. The vessel's skipper, as well as four other crew members, were also the subject of a criminal investigation regarding possible negligence.

== Aftermath ==
Setyo Rahardho, head of the National Transport Safety Commission, said that "journalists will not be allowed to accompany investigators any more", in the aftermath of the disasters. Hatta Radjasa, Indonesian Minister for Transportation, personally ordered the Directorate of Sea Transportation to revoke PT Praga Jaya Sentosa's license in response to the inaccurate passenger manifests. The directorate did so, and also suspended local harbourmaster J. Karelantang over his responsibility regarding the misleading documents. The captain, Andi Kurniawan, and the first officer, Sunaryo, were arrested after the disaster and charged with negligence.

The International Maritime Organization (IMO) reiterated an offer made to Indonesia in late 2006 (after over 400 people died in the sinking of Senopati Nusantara and Tri Star 1) to assist with aiding ferry safety. This time, Indonesia accepted, and the IMO made recommendations which resulted in the establishment of an action plan.
