= Nipah Island =

Island in Riau Islands Province, Indonesia

- Interactive map of Nipah Island

Geography
- Location: Southeast Asia
- Coordinates: 1.147655564265979°N 103.65690134057168°E

Administration
- Indonesia
- Province: Riau Islands
- City: Batam
- District (Kecamatan): Belakang Padang

Nipah Island (also known as Pulau Nipa or Pulau Nipah) is one of the many islands of Indonesia that lies south of Singapore and is one of the key points that demarcates the maritime border with Singapore.

== History ==
On 23 May 1973, Indonesia and Singapore formalised a sea boundary between themselves due to overlapping territorial sea claims. The boundary line in the Singapore Straits would be a straight line made up of six turning points which are equidistant from base islands on both sides of the straits. The counterpart of Nipah Island is Sudong Island on Singapore's side.

In 2003, environmentalists claimed that 300 million tonnes of sand was dredged out of the sea bed around Nipah Island to be sold to Singapore for its reclamation and construction works. This risked a disappearance of the island. The Indonesian government put a stop to the dredging in the same year and started redeveloping the island in 2004 as it would have threatened its maritime boundary. By 2009, reclamation works on the island saw the expansion of usable land from 0.62 hectares to 60 hectares at low tide.

Nipah Island was once again used as a reference point for a new western sea boundary agreed upon between Indonesia and Singapore. The counterpart on Singapore's side is Sultan Shoals.

The strategic importance of Nipah Island is also being threatened by rising sea levels due to climate change.

== Current use ==
Post 2009 reclamation, the island is currently being used as an anchorage, by a military naval base, and an oil storage facility.
