= National Search and Rescue Agency =

Government agency of Indonesia

- Badan Nasional Pencarian dan Pertolongan
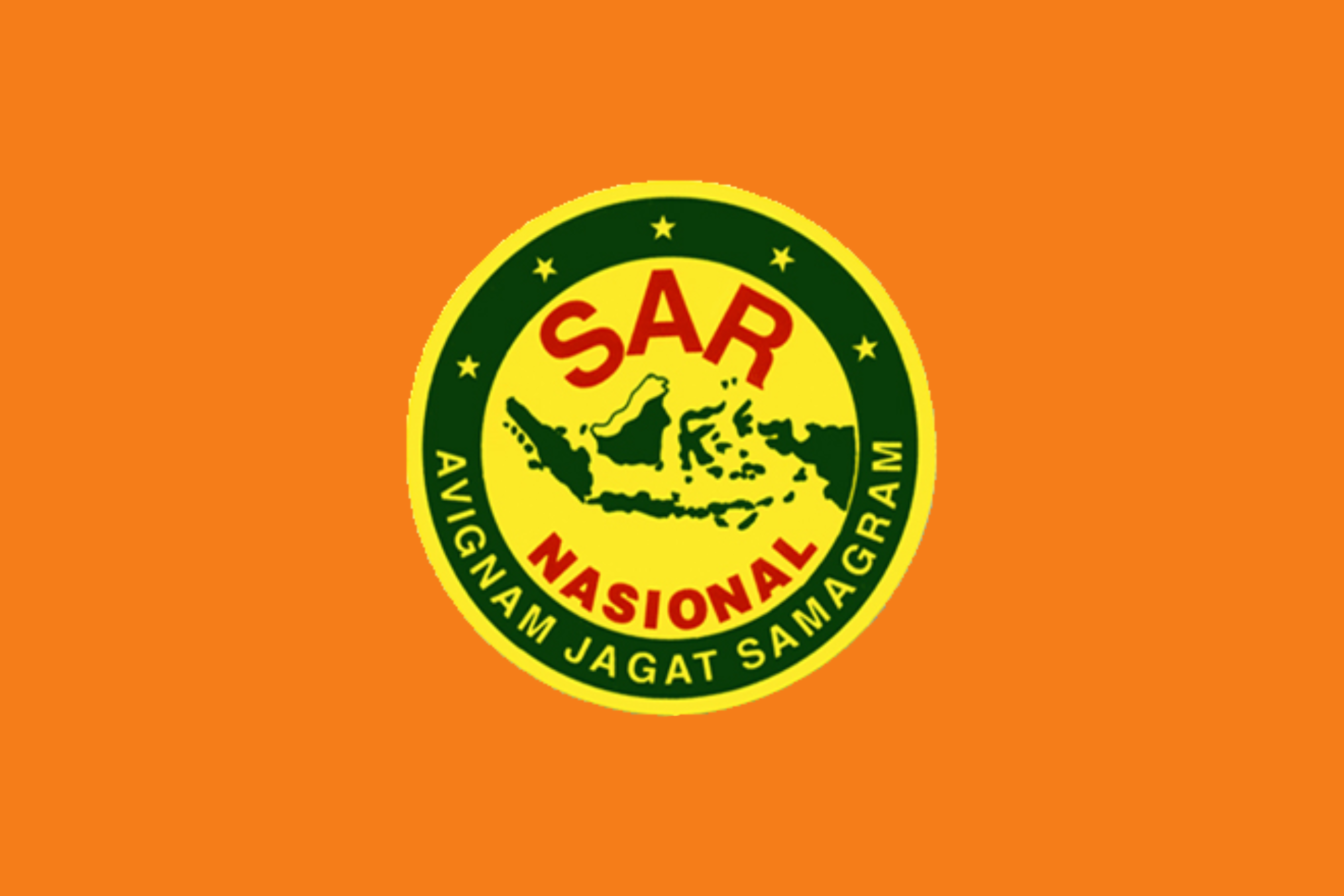
- Flag of the National Search and Rescue Agency

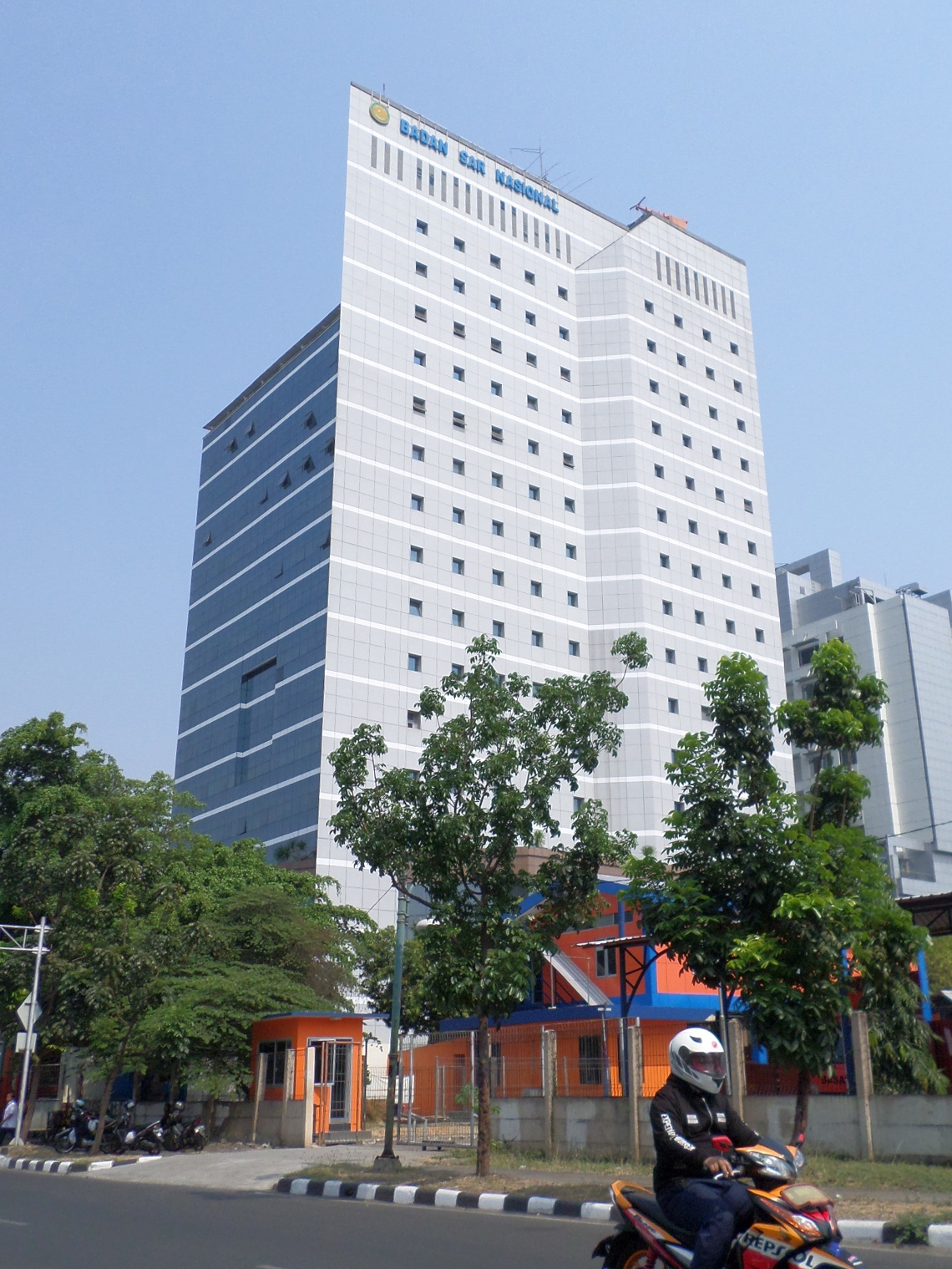
- National Search and Rescue Agency building in Jakarta

Agency overview
- Formed: 28 February 1972
- Jurisdiction: Government of Indonesia
- Headquarters: Gedung Badan SAR Nasional Jalan Angkasa Blok B.15 KAV 2–3 Kemayoran Jakarta Pusat 10720 – Indonesia
- Motto: Avignam Jagat Samagram (Sanskrit) "May the universe be saved"
- Agency executive: Air Marshal Mohammad Syafii, Head
- Website: www.basarnas.go.id

The National Search and Rescue Agency (Indonesian: Badan Nasional Pencarian dan Pertolongan, lit. 'Search and Rescue National Agency'; formerly named Badan SAR Nasional, both abbreviated Basarnas) is a government agency of Indonesia that specialize in search and rescue activity in Indonesia. Its head office is in Kemayoran, Central Jakarta, Jakarta.

== History ==
The formation of a national search and rescue organization in Indonesia was driven by international aviation and maritime safety requirements. In the early post-independence period, countries without a search and rescue (SAR) organization were classified as a "black area", a status that could negatively affect international relations and transportation safety. Indonesia became a member of the International Civil Aviation Organization (ICAO) in 1950 and the International Maritime Organization (IMO) in 1959, creating obligations to handle aviation and maritime accidents within its territory. To address this, the government issued Government Regulation No. 5 of 1955 to establish a SAR committee tasked with planning a national SAR system. Further steps were taken in 1968 with the establishment of the Jakarta Local SAR Team under the Ministry of Transportation, which became the precursor to a national SAR organization. A formal agency was created in 1972 through Presidential Decree No. 11 of 1972 with the establishment of the Indonesian Search and Rescue Agency (BASARI). For organizational efficiency, the National SAR Center was placed under the Ministry of Transportation in 1979 and renamed the National Search and Rescue Agency (Basarnas). In 2007, Basarnas was designated a non-departmental government institution directly responsible to the President, a status later updated to a non-ministerial government institution under Government Regulation No. 39 of 2009.

== Task ==
According to presidential decree No. 99/2007 regarding National Search and Rescue Agency Republic of Indonesia, Basarnas primary to task are to assist president in implementation of search and rescue activity in Indonesia.

=== Function ===
- Formulation of national and general policies in search and rescue;
- Formulation of technical policies in search and rescue;
- Policy coordination, planning and program development in search and rescue;
- Guidance, deployment, oversee search and rescue resources;
- Implementation of search and rescue;
- Implementation of initial operation of search and rescue;
- Coordinating search and rescue resources in search and rescue operation;
- Training and human resource development in the field of search and rescue;
- Research and development in the field of search and rescue;
- Information management and communication in the field of search and rescue;
- Implementing relation and cooperation in the field of search and rescue;
- Management of state assets/property within Basarnas;
- Guidance and general administration servicesin the field of search and rescue;
- Supervise over Basarnas' task and activity;
- Provide report, suggestion and consideration in the field of search and rescue;

In 2021, 2,264 search and rescue operations were carried out.

== Organisational structure ==
- Head of Basarnas (Kepala Badan SAR Nasional), Head of Basarnas is directly appointed and responsible to president.
- Secretariate General (Sekretariat Utama), its primary task are to assist in general affairs and report directly to Head of Basarnas, and it consist of 3 bureaus:
  - Bureau of General Affairs (Biro Umum)
  - Bureau of Planning and Foreign Cooperation (Biro Perencanaan dan Kerjasama Teknik Luar Negeri)
  - Bureau of Law and Human Resources (Biro Hukum dan Kepegawaian)
- Deputy of Search and Rescue Resources (Deputi Bidang Potensi SAR)
  - Directorate of Facilities and Infrastructure (Direktorat Sarana dan Prasarana)
  - Directorate of Resource Development and Search and Rescue Community (Direktorat Bina Ketenagaan dan Pemasyarakatan SAR)
- Deputy of Search and Rescue Operation (Deputi Bidang Operasi SAR)
  - Directorate of Operation and Training (Direktorat Operasi dan Latihan)
  - Directorate of Communication (Direktorat Komunikasi)
  - Data and Information Center (Pusat Data dan Informasi), a supporting unit within basarnas
- Inspectorate (Inspektorat)
- Technical Unit (Unit Pelaksana Teknis), its primary task to implement search and rescue activity in regional level, which consist of 13 Technical Unit Office Class A and 21 Technical Unit Office Class B.

== Equipment ==
=== Land Vehicles and Equipments ===
As of 2021, Basarnas land equipment includes 329 rescue motorcycles, 316 personnel carriers, 146 rescue cars, 100 rescue carrier vehicles, 92 rescue car compartments, 74 amphibious ATVs, 44 rescue truck compartments, 23 heavy duty ATVs, and 7 excavators.

=== Water Craft ===
As of 2021, Basarnas water craft inventory includes 4 KN SAR Class 1 (over 40 meters), 51 KN SAR Class 2 (30–40 meters), 10 KN SAR Class 3 (20–30 meters), 17 KN SAR Class 4 (under 20 meters), 53 Rigid inflatable boat (RIB) Class 1 (over 10 meters), 103 RIB Class 2 (under 10 meters), and 682 rubber boats and landing crafts.

=== Aircraft fleet ===
Aircraft	Image	Origin	Type	Variant	In service	Notes
Helicopter
Eurocopter AS365 Dauphin		France / Indonesia	SAR	AS365 N3+	5	2 operated by the Navy, 3 operated by the Air Force.
IPTN Bo-105		Germany / Indonesia	SAR	5 NBO-105CB 1 NBO-105CBS	6	operated by the Navy and Air Force.
AgustaWestland AW139		Italy	SAR		1	operated by the Air Force.

== List of major operations ==
=== Aviation ===
- Adam Air Flight 574 (2007)
- Sukhoi Superjet 100 crash (2012)
- Indonesia AirAsia Flight QZ8501 (2014)
- Lion Air Flight 610 (2018)

=== Ship Transportation ===
- KM Levina (2007)
- MV Sinar Bangun (2018)
- KMP Tunu Pratama Jaya (2025)
- KM Virgo Transport 8 (2026)

=== Natural Disasters ===
- Indian Ocean earthquake and tsunami (2004)
- Sumatra Flooda and Landslides (2025)

== See also ==
- Indonesian Board for Disaster Countermeasure
- List of aviation accidents and incidents in Indonesia
- List of natural disasters in Indonesia
