= Sinking of MV Sinar Bangun =

2018 disaster in Indonesia

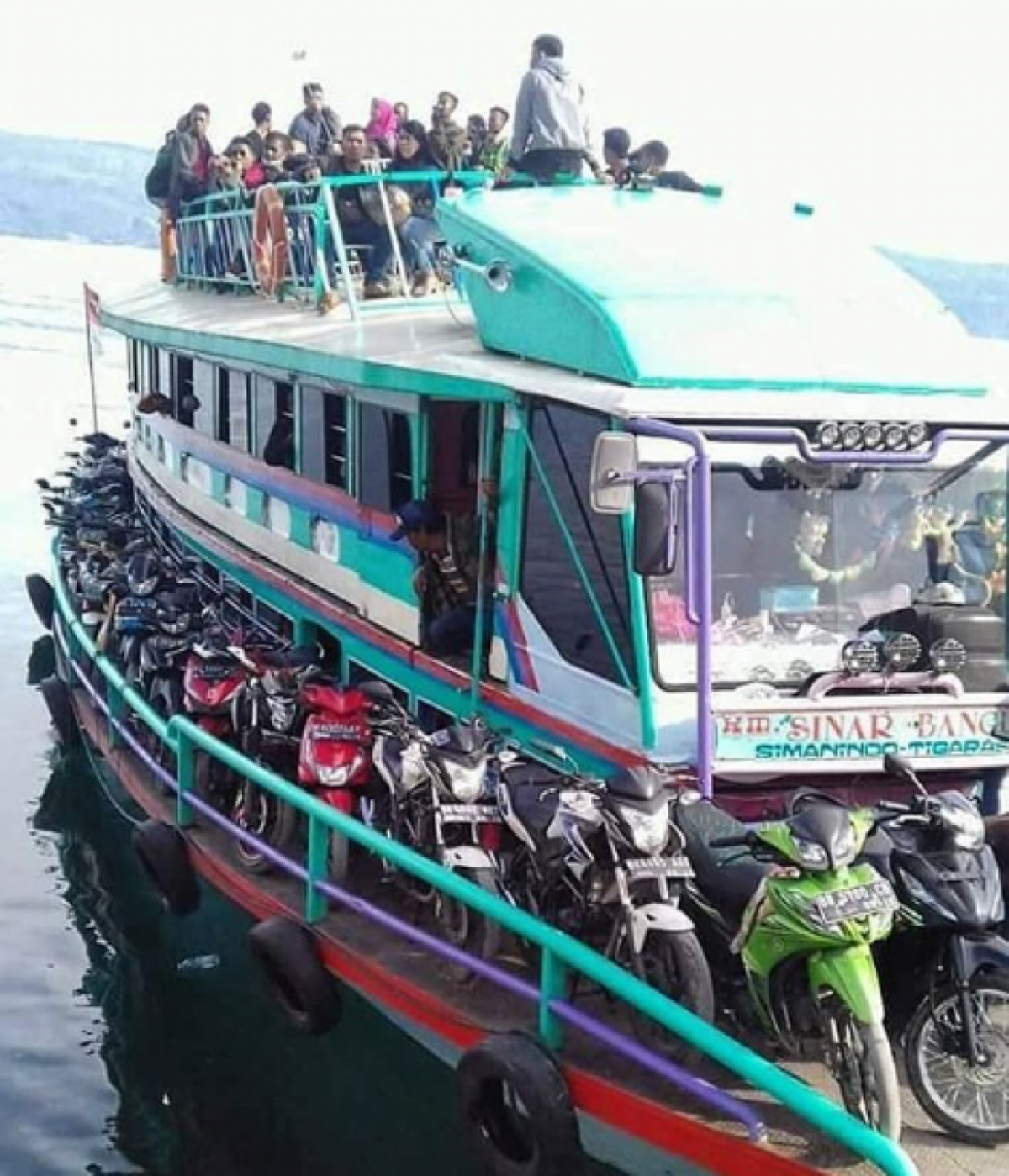
- MV Sinar Bangun, before the sinking
- Date: 18 June 2018; 8 years ago
- Time: 17:20 (UTC+7)
- Location: Lake Toba, North Sumatra, Indonesia
- Cause: Overloading; Inclement weather
- Outcome: Capsized in Lake Toba; Captain and crew were arrested
- Deaths: 3 confirmed
- Injuries: 21
- Missing: 164 (presumed dead)
- Sinking of MV Sinar Bangun (Northern Sumatra)

MV Sinar Bangun sank on 18 June 2018 in Lake Toba, North Sumatra, Indonesia, during its trip from Simanindo Harbour in Samosir Island to Tiga Ras Harbour in Simalungun Regency. The ferry was carrying 188 passengers and crew. After the sinking, authorities immediately deployed search and rescue personnel to the area. Twenty-one survivors were rescued, three bodies were found and 164 people were listed as missing and presumed dead.

The Indonesian National Transportation Safety Committee concluded that the sinking was caused by overloading. The crews' decision to load the ferry to four times its capacity, combined with improper loading of passengers and cargo, caused the ferry to be severely unstable. High waves in the area then caused the critically unstable ferry to capsize. As escape routes were blocked by vehicles, many passengers were unable to escape and were thus trapped inside the ferry.

== Sinking ==
MV Sinar Bangun was travelling from Simanindo Harbour in Samosir Regency on the north of Samosir Island to Tiga Ras Harbour in Simalungun Regency. Officials stated that many of the passengers were tourists who had traveled with families to Lake Toba, Indonesia's largest super-volcano lake. It was the holiday season in Indonesia, and the ferry was packed with passengers. Authorities stated that the ferry sank at around 17:00–17:30 local time. The ferry was reportedly carrying more than four times the rated capacity of 43 passengers and was equipped with only 45 life jackets.

Survivors stated that the winds were blowing hard and the waves were rough, with heavy rain. Another survivor stated that the steering wheel snapped during the disaster. The ferry swayed once and immediately capsized to starboard. The sinking happened just 22 minutes after it had left the harbour. It happened so quickly that not a single passenger managed to wear life jackets. Passengers who were located on the top of the ferry immediately jumped onto the water. Survivors recalled that passengers were screaming and were fighting to get out of the ferry as quickly as possible, with multiple people crushed or trampled during the disaster.

A video taken during the disaster was uploaded to social media by a passenger of the ferry. The video shows that the ferry capsized entirely, and reveals that many passengers initially had survived the sinking. At least 50 to 60 survivors are seen in the video clinging onto the hull, while others are swept away; screaming and crying can be heard. The video also shows that the passengers did not use life jackets or any other life-saving equipment. Another video taken by a passenger of a passing ferry shows that MV Sinar Bangun had fully submerged and that the number of survivors had decreased significantly; fewer than 30 survivors can be seen, and no survivors are seen clinging to the hull. On its final report, it was revealed that those who were seen clinging onto the hull were later struck by another massive wave, drowning dozens of people. Meanwhile, some of those who were seen floating around the hull later drowned due to exhaustion.

If the missing are confirmed dead, this will be the deadliest maritime disaster in Indonesia since the sinking of MV Teratai Prima in 2009, in which more than 300 perished.

== Passengers and crew ==
As there was no passenger manifest, it is not clear how many people were actually on board. Initially, around 80 to 100 were thought to be aboard the ferry. The number was later revised to 70. However, as authorities asked the public to report any missing relatives suspected to be passengers of the ferry, the number rose to 94. The number continued to rise and as of 19 June 2018, 145 people were reported missing. The names of 41 people were publicly posted at Simanindo Harbour, while the other 104 names were posted at Tiga Ras Harbour. Officials then confirmed that 128 people and 50 vehicles were aboard the ferry, and added that the data may change. Meanwhile, survivors claimed that around 200 people and 100 motorbikes were on board.

On 20 June 2018, the National Search and Rescue Agency confirmed that a total of 166 people were reported missing. Later in the afternoon, the number of people reported as missing reached 192.

On 26 June, officials finally finalized the total number of passengers, crew, and vehicles on board MV Sinar Bangun. The official list stated that there were 188 people on board the ferry, with 164 listed as missing. Among the missing were 18 members of a single family.

== Search and rescue ==
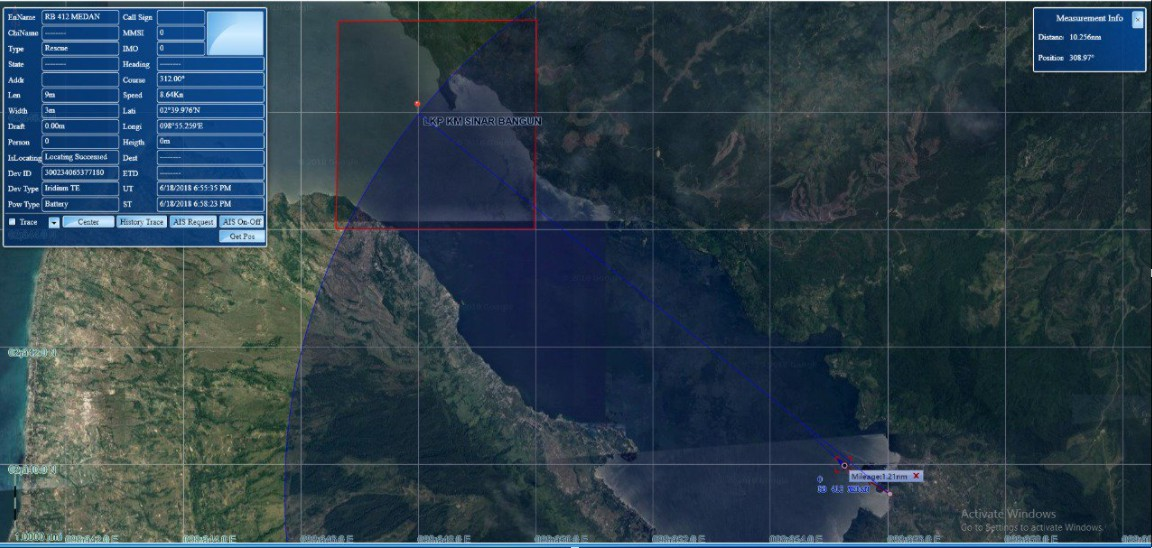
The Indonesian National Search and Rescue Agency published the map of the last known position of MV Sinar Bangun.

=== 18 June ===
The first vessel that managed to reach the site of the disaster was the MV Sumut II RORO vessel. It managed to rescue and evacuate 3 people from the site. Fifteen minutes later, MV Sumut I and MV Sinta Dame II arrived at the site. MV Sumut I rescued 14 survivors and the latter managed to evacuate 1 survivor and 1 dead body. At 17:40 local time, the Indonesian National Search and Rescue Agency was informed about the disaster. A joint search and rescue team was assembled and deployed in the area, consisting of the National Search and Rescue Agency, the National Armed Forces, regional and local government officials, the Agency for Meteorology, Climatology and Geophysics, and the regional Disaster Management Board. The site of the sinking is two nautical miles (3.7 km; 2.3 mi) from the harbour. Eighteen people were found to have survived the sinking. The first victim of the disaster was identified as Tri Suci Wulandari, a student from Aceh Tamiang, Aceh. Helicopters and ferries were deployed by authorities. The survivors were transported to Simarmata Community Health Center, Hadrinus Sinaga Regional Hospital, and Dolok Padarmean Community Health Center.

=== 19 June ===
Search and Rescue Mission Coordinator divided the joint search and rescue team into 2 groups. Officials stated that 350 personnel were deployed to assist the search and rescue operation. The rescue operation was hampered by bad weather and a lack of equipment. Personnel from Jakarta were called. Personal belongings were retrieved from the water; however, neither victims nor survivors were found. The search and rescue operation was called off. In the late evening of 19 June, a C-130 Hercules carrying multiple personnel and advanced equipment arrived at Silangit Airport.

=== 20 June ===
At least seven ships were deployed by the command center. The search area was widened to 3.6 square kilometres (1.4 sq mi). Divers were dispatched to Lake Toba. By the evening, search and rescue recovered more bodies. Authorities stated that the other bodies were most likely trapped inside the wreckage of the ferry.

Officials from the National Search and Rescue Agency stated that the rescue operation would be conducted for seven days. Minister of Transportation Budi Karya Sumadi stated that the search and rescue operation would be extended to ten days if necessary.

=== 21 June ===
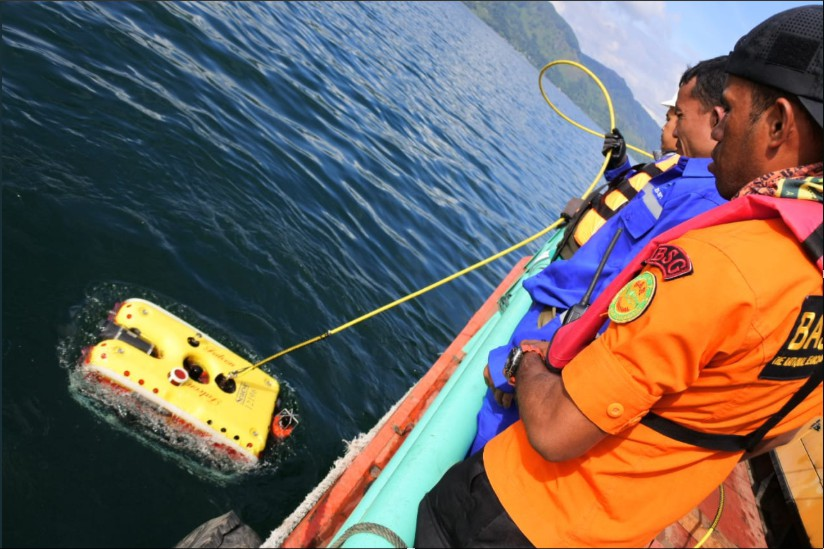
Members of the Indonesian National Search and Rescue Agency lowered an ROV to search the wreckage of MV Sinar Bangun.

The search area was widened to 15 square kilometres (5.8 sq mi) to the east, as a projection made by the Indonesian BMKG predicted that the current would carry the passengers and crews to the east. Ten boats were deployed to the search area.

=== 22 June ===
Lake Toba is known to be up to 500 metres (1,600 ft) deep in many places; however, depth traces by the search team indicated depths of up to 1,600 metres (5,200 ft), which is far beyond the 350-metre (1,150 ft) maximum working depth of the deployed Remote Observation Vehicle, and no traces of the ship were found. Separate sonar tools, effective up to 600 metres (2,000 ft), also showed the lake was deeper than 600 metres. As a result, a 2,000-metre (6,600 ft) sonar tool was ordered to be sent to the area.

=== 23 June ===
The search area was widened again to 25 square kilometres (9.7 sq mi) to the east. A helicopter was deployed to assist in the search and rescue. Volunteers also searched for bodies or survivors on the shore. The Indonesian Navy was deployed to conduct an underwater sonar scan.

=== 24 June ===
Officials decided to widen the search area to 10 square kilometres (3.9 sq mi) to the east. In the evening, a meeting was held between authorities and family members to discuss whether the search and rescue effort should be continued or not. Both parties agreed to extend the search and rescue period to another 3 days.

=== 28 June ===
The Indonesian Search and Rescue Agency announced that their personnel had captured an object in their sonar image. The object was located at a depth of 450 metres (1,480 ft). The object was suspected to be the wreckage of the ferry. A salvage operation was conducted. Later in the evening, the Head of the Indonesian Search and Rescue Agency, Muhammad Syaugi, stated that an ROV spotted bodies and motorcycles in the surrounding area. Photos of the submerged motorcycles and the dead bodies were shown to the media.

=== 2 July ===
The government announced that the search would be stopped on 3 July. The reason is that the agency had found difficulties because Lake Toba's depth is more than 450-metre (1,480 ft) while at this time the agency only can search up to 200-metre (660 ft). The victims' families had said that they were already letting go of their relatives.

== Investigation ==
Personnel from the National Transportation Safety Committee were sent by the Ministry of Transportation. Police confirmed that the weather at the time was bad, and added that it might have contributed to the cause of the disaster. They later added that, based on multiple accounts, the ferry might have been overloaded.

The Agency for Meteorology, Climatology, and Geophysics claimed that they had warned people twice to not board any boat or ferry, just hours before the disaster. Two severe weather warnings had been issued by the agency. The first was issued at 11:00 and the second was issued at 14:00. They had warned that the weather in and around Lake Toba would deteriorate on that day. Records showed that there was a significant change in wind speeds during the disaster. Waves reaching as high as two metres were also recorded.

Minister of Transportation Budi Karya Sumadi stated that the ferry was grossly overloaded. The ferry was identified as a 35-tonage-type boat. He added that the ferry could only hold a maximum number of 43 people. Reports stated that on the day of the disaster over 100 people had boarded the ferry.

President Joko Widodo ordered the Minister of Transportation to conduct an immediate evaluation of the safety of all ferry services.

The police opened an investigation into the ferry's fitness for operation. They found that the operator did not have a passenger manifest or a permit to operate the ferry service. It was later revealed that the ferry service was illegal.

The captain of the ferry, Situa Sagala, was arrested at his house at Simanindo on 18 June, the day of the sinking, having crossed back across to the island by some other means of transportation. In addition, three transport officials were also arrested as suspects.

=== Final report ===
On 19 November 2018, more than 5 months after the disaster, the Indonesian National Transportation Safety Committee published the final report of the investigation. They concluded that the disaster was caused by overloading. The first deck and the second deck of the ferry were overly loaded with passengers. It was so crowded that dozens of passengers had to stand up while the ferry was en route to Simalungun. However, the presence of the third deck, which was located on top of the ferry and was used as a selfie spot, was a major factor in the capsizing. During the disaster, the third deck was heavily crowded. Calculations made by the NTSC revealed that due to this, the ferry could easily capsize as the righting moment of the ferry was small. While the ferry was en route to Simalungun, the weather deteriorated and high waves were produced. The high waves and the heavy wind that was blowing to the side of the ferry then caused the ferry to capsize.

Another factor contributing to the capsizing is the use of steel on the structure of the ferry. Most parts of the ferry were made of steel. Since steel is heavier than wood and since it was used for the third deck and on some parts of the ferry, the ferry becomes more unstable.

Investigators noted that the ferry was not equipped with sufficient life jackets. However, even if the ferry had been equipped with sufficient life jackets, NTSC stated that no one would have been able to wear them as the capsizing happened so quickly. Investigators noted that the ferry also didn't have sufficient emergency doors (there was only one emergency door on board) and that the vehicles were placed improperly on the ferry. The vehicles blocked the doors on the ferry, causing people to be trapped.

Further investigation revealed that the Captain was never trained properly. He also didn't know how to deal with an emergency. Deviation from regulations and insufficient supervision from local officials also contributed to the poor quality of the crew.

The report also criticized the actions of the crews of MV Sumut II who, according to the report, didn't make a serious effort to save the survivors. Examination of the video of the rescue operation showed that the crew of MV Sumut II had only managed to save three survivors even though the ship was still able to carry more survivors. At the time, dozens of survivors were still floating near the ship. The remaining survivors were later abandoned until the MV Sumut I and MV Sinta Dame II arrived at the site. Investigators noted that during this time, the number of survivors had decreased significantly as several survivors had drowned due to exhaustion.

== Aftermath ==
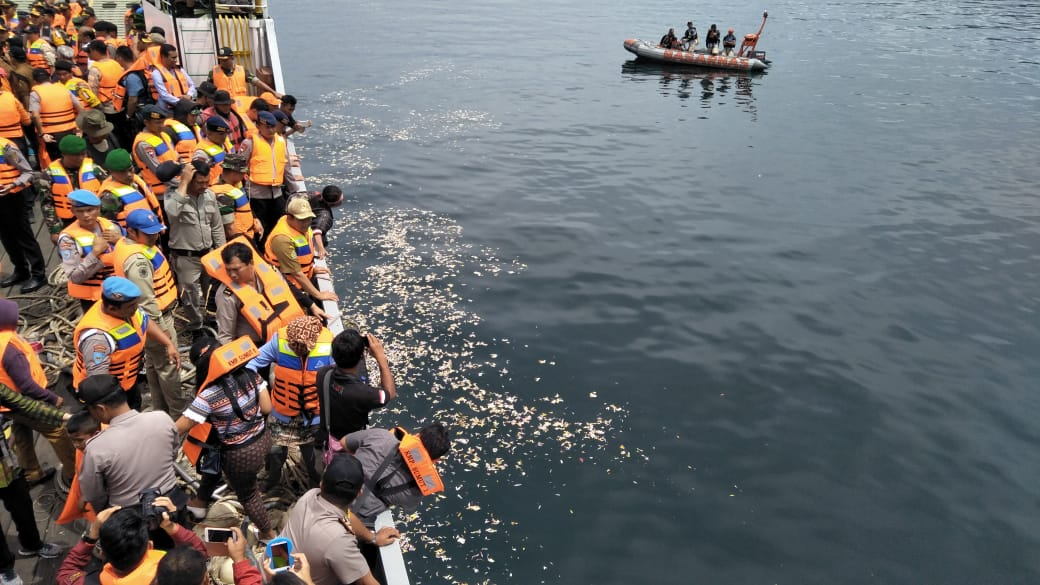
Relatives of the victims held a memorial service and threw flowers near the location of the sinking.

Jasa Raharja, a state-owned insurance company, stated that they would cover the expenses of the victims, stating that a total amount of 50 million rupiah (approximately US$3,500) would be given to the relatives of the deceased while a total amount of 20 million rupiah (approximately US$1,400) would be given to the relatives of the injured survivors. Many relatives of the victims expressed anger at the government for not enforcing basic safety measures on passenger boats and pleaded for a bigger search effort.

On 20 June 2018, the government suspended ferry services between Simanindo and Tigaras for an initial period of seven days, with a possible extension of three days.

On 2 July, families and relatives of the victims held a memorial service near the location of the sinking. The service was attended by then Minister of Maritime Luhut Binsar Panjaitan. A prayer service was also held by relatives earlier in the day. The memorial was conducted as they had been told that the search and rescue operation would be stopped.

A plan to build a monument to commemorate the victims of the disaster was announced by officials.

== See also ==
- MV Le Joola, Senegal's worst maritime disaster, caused by overloading
- MV Sewol, a South Korean ferry sunk while turning due to insufficient restoring force caused by overloading
- MV Butiraoi, an overloaded ferry which sunk in Kiribati earlier that year
- MV Senopati Nusantara, an Indonesian ferry that sank in 2006
- MV Dumai Express 10, another Indonesian ferry which sank in 2009
