= National Transportation Safety Committee =

Indonesia government investigative agency for civil transportation accidents

- Komite Nasional Keselamatan Transportasi
- Seal of the NTSC

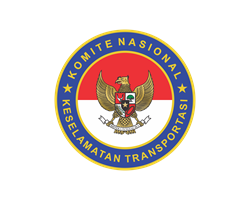
- Logo of the NTSC

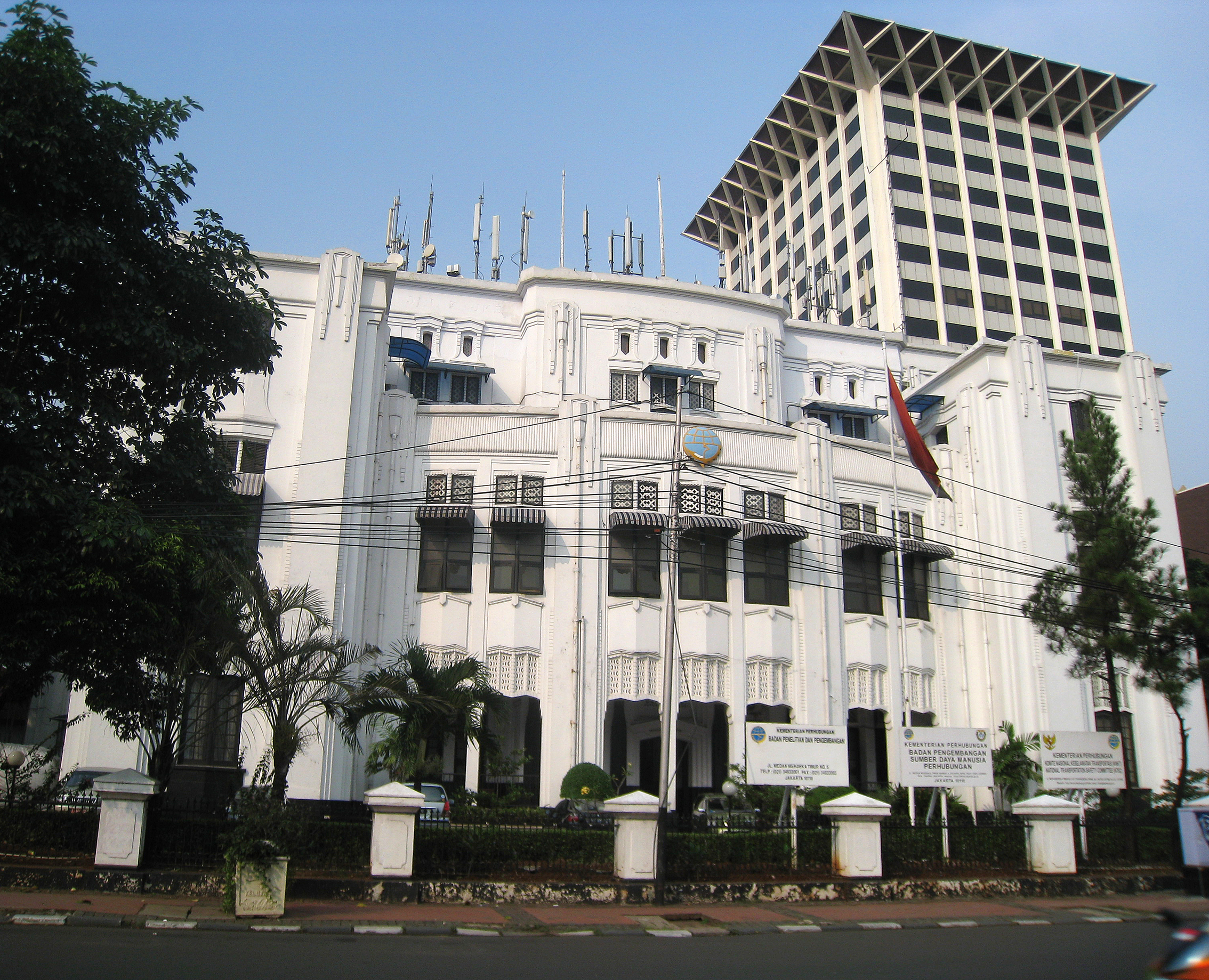
- NTSC head office at Transportation Building (Gedung Transportasi), Jakarta on the third floor.

Agency overview
- Formed: 1999; 27 years ago
- Jurisdiction: Government of Indonesia
- Headquarters: Transportation Building 3rd floor, Medan Merdeka Timur Street 5, Central Jakarta, Jakarta, Indonesia
- Agency executives: Soerjanto Tjahjono, Chairman; Haryo Satmiko, Deputy Chairman
- Website: knkt.go.id

The National Transportation Safety Committee (NTSC; Indonesian: Komite Nasional Keselamatan Transportasi, KNKT) is an Indonesian government agency charged with the investigation of air, land, rail, and marine transportation safety deficiencies.

It has its headquarters on the third floor of the Ministry of Transportation Building in Central Jakarta, Jakarta. It was formerly a part of the Ministry of Transportation, before it was set as independent agency directly under the President in 2012.

== History ==
Before the NTSC existed, the Aircraft Accident Investigation Commission (AAIC, Indonesian: Komisi Penelitian Penyebab Kecelakaan Pesawat Udara, KPPKPU) researched and investigated aviation accidents and incidents since the formation of the AAIC on 15 July 1994. It was founded by Minister of Transportation at that time, Dr. Haryanto Dhanutirto. At first the AAIC research and investigation unit was an ad-hoc body within the Ministry of Transportation. It was made permanent on 16 January 1997.

The NTSC was established by Presidential Decree No.105/1999 in 1September 1999, by amalgamating AAIC with internal investigation units of IPTN and PAL. With the decree, the NTSC also gained power to research and investigate not only aviation accidents and incidents but also accidents and incidents in land transportations and water transportations. Subsequent to its investigations, the NTSC makes recommendations that are intended to prevent the recurrence of similar accidents.

The NTSC emphasizes that the sole objective of its activities is to prevent recurrence of accidents, not to assign blame or liability.

In 2000, shortly after its creation, the NTSC issued a report on the crash of SilkAir Flight 185, where 104 people were killed, which stated that the agency was unable to determine a cause. The United States National Transportation Safety Board, which had also assisted in the Flight 185 investigation, told the NTSC that the cause of the crash was a suicide by pilot (in this case the captain) via a letter sent on 11 December the same year.

However, the first aviation accident investigated by the NTSC was Garuda Indonesia Flight 152, where 234 people were killed. This occurred less than three months before the SilkAir Flight 185 crash. The report of Flight 152 was issued in 2004 (having been hampered by the SilkAir Flight 185 crash), which stated that agency determined that the cause of the crash of Flight 152 was air traffic control (ATC) error.

During its foundational period, it was part of the Ministry of Transportation, until 2012 it was made independent, but retained administrative support from the Ministry of Transportation for the secretarial affairs.

== See also ==
- Directorate General of Civil Aviation (Indonesia)
- Garuda Indonesia Flight 200 (2007)
