= List of shipwrecks in 2018 =

The list of shipwrecks in 2018 includes ships sunk, foundered, grounded, or otherwise lost during 2018.

table of contents
2018
Jan	Feb	Mar	Apr
May	Jun	Jul	Aug
Sep	Oct	Nov	Dec

== January ==
=== 1 January ===
List of shipwrecks: 1 January 2018
Ship	State	Description
Anugrah Express	Indonesia	Carrying 51 people, the speedboat capsized off North Kalimantan, Borneo, Indonesia, approximately ten minutes after departing Tarakan for a one-hour voyage to Tanjung Selor. At least eight people drowned. Twenty-two survivors were rescued, leaving the rest on board missing.

=== 2 January ===
List of shipwrecks: 2 January 2018
Ship	State	Description
Changping	China	The cargo ship was in a collision with Xinwang 138 (China) in the Yangtze Estuary off Shanghai and sank. Three of her thirteen crew were rescued, ten were reported missing.
Jin Ming 16 Hao	Taiwan	The cargo ship was driven ashore near Pambujan, Philippines. Her nine crew were rescued.

=== 5 January ===
List of shipwrecks: 5 January 2018
Ship	State	Description
BD 97619 TS	Vietnam	The fishing vessel was in a collision with Xuan Thanh 10 (Vietnam), which kept moving even after the collision, and capsized in the South China Sea. The 15 crew on board escaped safely.

=== 6 January ===
List of shipwrecks: 6 January 2018
Ship	State	Description
Chok Chu Chai	Thailand	The fishing vessel was in a collision with Hyderabad (Pakistan) in waters southeast of Laem Chabang, where the vessel sank partially submerged with the bow above the water. Four people were rescued and four were reported missing.
Mestre Simao	Portugal	The ferry was driven ashore at Madalena, Pico Island. Her 61 passengers were evacuated, nine crew remained on board. She was on a voyage from Faial Island to Pico Island.
Sanchi; CF Crystal	Panama; Hong Kong	The tanker Sanchi collided with the cargo ship CF Crystal 160 nautical miles (300 km) off Shanghai, China, and caught fire. Her 32 crew were reported missing. All 21 crew of CF Crystal were rescued. Sanchi sank on 14 January with all 32 Iranian crew presumed dead.
Uros Z	Argentina	The incomplete tanker broke from her moorings at Corrientes and drifted down the Paraná River for 31 nautical miles (58 km) until she ran aground on a sandbank.

=== 8 January ===
List of shipwrecks: 8 January 2018
Ship	State	Description
Jiarong 36	China	The cargo ship was in collision with the fishing vessel Minxiayuo 1829 (China) and capsized and sank off Wenzhou. Her twelve crew were rescued.

=== 10 January ===
List of shipwrecks: 10 January 2018
Ship	State	Description
Urata	Vanuatu	The landing craft sprang a leak and was abandoned (17°00′S 167°37′E). All 75 people on board were rescued by Young Blood (Australia).

=== 11 January ===
List of shipwrecks: 1 January 2018
Ship	State	Description
IRIS Damavand	Islamic Republic of Iran Navy	The Moudge-class frigate was driven ashore and damaged at Bandar-Anzali. Two of her crew were reported missing. The frigate broke in two on 20 January, and finally sank on 28 January.
Jiaming Lun	Taiwan	The coaster was driven ashore at Dongjili. Her eight crew were rescued. She broke in two on 25 January and was a total loss.

=== 12 January ===
List of shipwrecks: 12 January 2018
Ship	State	Description
Do Minh Toan	Vietnam	The cargo ship capsized and sank in the South China Sea. Two of her thirteen crew were reported missing. Survivors were rescued by Asiatic Dawn (Marshall Islands), MG Neptune (Bahamas) and Nordilly (Malta).

=== 13 January ===
List of shipwrecks: 13 January 2018
Ship	State	Description
Hong Fan 032	China	The cargo ship capsized and sank.

=== 14 January ===
List of shipwrecks: 14 January 2018
Ship	State	Description
Island Lady	United States	Carrying 36 passengers and a crew of 14, the shuttle boat caught fire and was run aground in shallow water and burned out off Tampa, Florida, while ferrying customers to the Ocean Breeze Casino, an offshore casino boat in the Gulf of Mexico. Fifteen people were taken to hospitals. One of them, a female passenger, died.

=== 16 January ===
List of shipwrecks: 16 January 2018
Ship	State	Description
Halland	Cyprus	The cargo ship ran aground in Kalmar Strait on approaches to port in Mönsterås, Sweden while travelling at high speed of around six knots (11 km/h).
Hui Feng	China	The cargo ship collided with Feng Hai 18 (China) and sank off Baoshan.

=== 17 January ===
List of shipwrecks: 17 January 2018
Ship	State	Description
Genessa	India	The tanker caught fire 14 nautical miles (26 km; 16 mi) off Kandla. Her 26 crew were evacuated, but one of them subsequently died from burns sustained in the fire.

=== 18 January ===
List of shipwrecks: 18 January 2018
Ship	State	Description
Butiraoi	Kiribati	The wooden catamaran ferry left Nonouti on a two-day journey to South Tarawa, but capsized and sunk en route (exact date still unknown). Seven people were rescued on 22 January, as search and rescue efforts continued. The aerial search for the vessel and possible survivors was eventually called off on 1 February, with 81 people still missing and presumed lost.
Sinan Naiboglu	Turkey	The cargo ship was driven ashore at Aliağa.

=== 19 January ===
List of shipwrecks: 19 January 2018
Ship	State	Description
Berra G	Comoros	The bulk carrier was driven ashore and broke in two at Karadeniz Ereğli, Turkey. Her twelve crew were rescued. She was on a voyage from İzmir, Turkey, to Rostov-on-Don, Russia.
Diana	Antigua & Barbuda	The cargo ship drifted aground in Haifa Bay off the Israeli coast after beginning to drift while anchored near shore.

=== 22 January ===
List of shipwrecks: 22 January 2018
Ship	State	Description
Intanini	Indonesia	The cargo ship sank on this date. Two missing.

=== 24 January ===
List of shipwrecks: 24 January 2018
Ship	State	Description
Virginia Renee	United States	The towboat sank at its berth in the Mississippi River near Blytheville, Arkansas. The ship was raised and refloated a few days later.

=== 26 January ===
List of shipwrecks: 26 January 2018
Ship	State	Description
Frakt Fjord	Cyprus	The cargo ship ran aground in Kolding Fjord while approaching port of Kolding, Denmark.
Senor de la Misericordia	Peru	The fishing vessel collided with Jamila (Liberia) 29 nautical miles (54 km) southwest of Paita, and sank. The ship was reportedly sailing unauthorized at time of collision. Three people were reported dead.

=== 27 January ===
List of shipwrecks: 27 January 2018
Ship	State	Description
Caballo Eclipse	Mexico	The offshore supply ship capsized and sank off Carmelite Island.
Canci Ladjoni 3	Indonesia	The cargo ship foundered in the Flores Sea between Jumpea and Kayuadi. Her twenty crew were rescued.

=== 30 January ===
List of shipwrecks: 30 January 2018
Ship	State	Description
Jian Hong No.1	Mongolia	The cargo ship foundered in the Taiwan Strait. Two of her ten crew were rescued, eight were reported missing.

=== 31 January ===
List of shipwrecks: 31 January 2018
Ship	State	Description
Sunnfjord	United States	The fishing vessel sank off Cape Alava in Washington after suffering water ingress and pump failures.

=== Unknown date ===
List of shipwrecks: unknown date January 2018
Ship	State	Description
Akutan	United States	The derelict Design 381 fishing/fish processing vessel was scuttled with explosives 25 nautical miles (46 km; 29 mi) north north west of Dutch Harbor, Alaska sometime in mid-January.

== February ==
=== 1 February ===
List of shipwrecks: 1 February 2018
Ship	State	Description
Galleon Adventurer	United States	The offshore supply tug capsized in the Atlantic Ocean 40 nautical miles (74 km) south of Saint George's, Grenada (11°28′N 61°35′W). Five crew were rescued, her captain was reported missing.
Mengkara	Indonesia	The ship was driven ashore on the coast of South Sulawesi. All 35 people on board were rescued.

=== 2 February ===
List of shipwrecks: 2 February 2018
Ship	State	Description
Berg	Moldova	The cargo ship was beached near Feodosia, in the Crimean peninsula. Her crew were rescued. She had previously suffered a hull breach in the River Don, Russia. The ship finally sank on 20 March, with the forecastle and superstructure above the water. Berg was consequently declared a total loss.

=== 3 February ===
List of shipwrecks: 3 February 2018
Ship	State	Description
Hang Yu 11	Panama	The tanker was driven ashore at Taoyuan, Taiwan. She was refloated on 21 February by the salvage tugs Salvage Ace and Salvage Champion (both Saint Vincent and the Grenadines).
Shun An Lun	China	The cargo ship was severely damaged by fire off Zhoushan, China. Her eleven crew were rescued.
Tallas	Cambodia	The crewless cargo ship was driven ashore at Zeytinburnu, Turkey. She was subsequently scrapped in situ during June.

=== 10 February ===
List of shipwrecks: 10 February 2018
Ship	State	Description
Hephaestus	Togo	The bunker tanker drifted ashore and ran aground at Qawra, Malta. Its seven crew disembarked safely.

=== 16 February ===
List of shipwrecks: xx February 2018
Ship	State	Description
Marshal Shaposhnikov	Russian Navy	The Udaloy-class destroyer was damaged by fire at Vladivostok, Russia. All 106 crew were evacuated.

=== 18 February ===
List of shipwrecks: 18 February 2018
Ship	State	Description
Orca	Ecuador	The cargo ship capsized at Guayaquil, trapping one of its five crew.

=== 22 February ===
List of shipwrecks: 22 February 2018
Ship	State	Description
Xingying F069	China	The coaster collided with Hai Kou Jiu Hao (China) and sank off Hainan. Three of her five crew were rescued, two were reported missing.

=== 23 February ===
List of shipwrecks: 23 February 2018
Ship	State	Description
Binh Nguyen 86	Vietnam	The cargo ship foundered in the Gulf of Tonkin. Her eight crew were rescued.

=== 27 February ===
List of shipwrecks: 27 February 2018
Ship	State	Description
Flourishever	Panama	The bulk carrier ran aground in the South China Sea (23°20′N 117°22′E).

=== 28 February ===
List of shipwrecks: 28 February 2018
Ship	State	Description
Michael Putra	Indonesia	The cargo ship caught fire in the Java Sea. All eighteen people on board abandoned ship and were rescued by fishing boats.

=== Unknown date ===
List of shipwrecks: Unknown date in February 2018
Ship	State	Description
Glovis Spring	Marshall Islands	The car carrier ran aground in waters near the Paracel Islands while en route to Hong Kong.
Rhosus	Unflagged (Note: The ship's last known flag was Moldova, but had been removed from the Moldovan shipping register in 2014.)	The general cargo ship was abandoned in the Port of Beirut by its owner and crew years earlier, and sank in the breakwaters of the port between 16 and 18 February.

== March ==
=== 1 March ===
List of shipwrecks: 1 March 2018
Ship	State	Description
Matsusho Maru	Japan	The tug was driven ashore along with its barge Matsusho (Japan) on Shikoku Island. Her seven crew were rescued by a Japan Coast Guard helicopter.

=== 2 March ===
List of shipwrecks: 2 March 2018
Ship	State	Description
Artemis	USA	The fishing boat broke free from its mooring at Provincetown, Massachusetts in a storm and was driven onto the West End breakwater and sank. In July 2018 the wreck was raised, taken into Provincetown harbour and broken up.

=== 6 March ===
List of shipwrecks: 6 March 2018
Ship	State	Description
Betanzos	Spain	The cargo ship was driven ashore at Lisbon, Portugal. Her ten crew were rescued. She was on a voyage from Lisbon to Casablanca, Morocco. Betanzos was refloated on 16 March.
Maersk Honam	Singapore	The container ship caught fire in the Arabian Sea. Four of her 27 crew were reported missing, the rest were rescued by ALS Ceres (Marshall Islands). One of those rescued subsequently died from injuries sustained in the fire.
Viet Thuan 68	Vietnam	The cargo ship collided with Phuong Linh 16 (Vietnam) and sank off Nam Dinh. Her nine crew were rescued.

=== 10 March ===
List of shipwrecks: 10 March 2018
Ship	State	Description
Sirius Høj	Denmark	The dredger capsized and sank at Bogense. Both crew were rescued. She was righted the next day and taken into Bogense.

=== 12 March ===
List of shipwrecks: 12 March 2018
Ship	State	Description
AD-16-05	Indonesia	The military troop carrier sank in Java Sea near the Thousand Islands after an engine failure and impact from a high swell. All 65 soldiers on board were rescued by AD-04-15 (Indonesia).
Natalie Jean	United States	The tugboat fouled the anchor chain of the anchored bulk carrier Atlantic Fairy (Panama) in the Mississippi River near the 4600 block of Patterson drive, Algiers, Louisiana causing her to capsize and sink. The vessel was raised in June. One crewman was rescued by the tug Earl Gonsoulin, two were killed.

=== 13 March ===
List of shipwrecks: 13 March 2018
Ship	State	Description
Leigh River	Mexico	The supply vessel sprang a leak and foundered in the Gulf of Mexico 55 nautical miles (102 km) off Veracruz. Her eight crew were rescued by Sredna Gora (Bulgaria).

=== 14 March ===
List of shipwrecks: 14 March 2018
Ship	State	Description
Harriet	Liberia	The bulk carrier ran aground in the White Sea off Arkhangelsk, Russia. She was on a voyage from Arkhangelsk to Terneuzen, South Holland, Netherlands. Harriet was refloated on 31 March.

=== 20 March ===
List of shipwrecks: 20 March 2018
Ship	State	Description
Britannica Hav	Malta	The cargo ship capsized in the English Channel after colliding with the fishing vessel Deborah (Belgium). Her seven crew were rescued by helicopter.

=== 21 March ===
List of shipwrecks: 21 March 2018
Ship	State	Description
JBB Rong Chang 8	Dominica	The dredger capsized in the Malacca Strait. Twelve of her fourteen crew were reported missing.

=== 25 March ===
List of shipwrecks: 25 March 2018
Ship	State	Description
Pink Dolphin	South Korea	The high-speed catamaran ferry ran aground at Sinan. All 163 people on board were rescued.
Princess Hawaii	United States	Princess Hawaii The 61-foot (19 m) longline fishing vessel sank in the Pacific Ocean approximately 400 nautical miles (740 km; 460 mi) north of the island of Hawaii after two large waves struck her. Her crew of eight survived and was rescued by another fishing vessel 12 hours later.

=== 28 March ===
List of shipwrecks: 28 March 2018
Ship	State	Description
Cheng Chang 332	China	The cargo ship collided with Morning Cherry (Panama) and sank in the Pearl River. Three of her twelve crew were reported missing.

=== 31 March ===
List of shipwrecks: 31 March 2018
Ship	State	Description
Ever Judger	Panama	The bulk carrier caught fire off Balikpapan, Indonesia. Its twenty crew were evacuated.
Yuan Tai 789	China	The cargo ship ran aground in the Taiwan Strait off Kinmen Island. Her crew were rescued.

=== Unknown date ===
List of shipwrecks: 21/22 March 2018
Ship	State	Description
Transforza	Gibraltar	The cargo ship ran aground in the Gulf of Riga south of Kihnu Island while en route to Finland.

== April ==
=== 6 April ===
List of shipwrecks: 6 April 2018
Ship	State	Description
Da Pu Jiang	China	The cargo ship foundered off Ningbo with the loss of one of her thirteen crew.

=== 7 April ===
List of shipwrecks: 7 April 2018
Ship	State	Description
Crystal Bay	Panama	The cargo ship was driven ashore in Luzon, Philippines. She was on a voyage from Port Klang, Malaysia, to Niigata, Japan.

=== 8 April ===
List of shipwrecks: 8 April 2018
Ship	State	Description
Shahin	Panama	The ro-ro cargo ship sank at Port Sudan, Sudan. Her four crew were rescued.

=== 18 April ===
List of shipwrecks: 18 April 2018
Ship	State	Description
Geos	Malaysia	The research vessel caught fire off Kuala Baram. One of her 38 crew was reported missing.

=== 24 April ===
List of shipwrecks: 24 April 2018
Ship	State	Description
Shen Song 618	China	The cargo ship sank in the Yangtze River with the loss of three of her six crew.

== May ==
=== 16 May ===
List of shipwrecks: 16 May 2018
Ship	State	Description
Hong Peng	China	The cargo ship sank in the Taiwan Strait. Five rescued, six missing.

=== 18 May ===
List of shipwrecks: 18 May 2018
Ship	State	Description
Bukit Raya	Indonesia	The passenger ship ran aground in the Lapma Strait in the South China Sea.

=== 22 May ===
List of shipwrecks: 22 May 2018
Ship	State	Description
Long Hui Da 6999	China	The cargo ship foundered in the Yellow Sea off Weihai. Seven of her eleven crew were reported missing.

=== 23 May ===
List of shipwrecks: 23 May 2018
Ship	State	Description
Citra Mulia 9	Indonesia	The cargo ship foundered in the Java Sea (5°34′S 110°59′E). Her nineteen crew were rescued.

=== 25 May ===
List of shipwrecks: 25 May 2018
Ship	State	Description
Oliver Cromwell	United Kingdom	The motor paddle vessel foundered in the Irish Sea 10 nautical miles (19 km) off the coast of Anglesey whilst being towed from Gloucester to Coleraine, Northern Ireland. There was nobody on board. Its final moments were attended by the Holyhead Lifeboat.

=== 28 May ===
List of shipwrecks: 28 May 2018
Ship	State	Description
Sheng Ming	Panama	The bulk carrier foundered 180 nautical miles (330 km) west of Cape Town, South Africa after suffering engine room flooding on 12 April and being towed for 1 1/2 months.

=== 29 May ===
List of shipwrecks: 29 May 2018
Ship	State	Description
Chem Norma	Marshall Islands	The tanker ran aground in the St. Lawrence River at Morrisburg, Ontario, at 04:10 on 29 May, local time. The ship ran aground next to the village, out of the main shipping channel. The ship remained intact, with no water entering, nor oil exiting the vessel. The Saint Lawrence Seaway remained open for traffic. The ship was pulled free on 4 June having struck an old lock system that had been submerged during the creation of the Saint Lawrence Seaway. The cause of the grounding was due to the vessel's issues with its rudder.

=== 30 May ===
List of shipwrecks: 29 May 2018
Ship	State	Description
Barlovento Primero	Spain	The dredger sank at Suances. Her three crew were rescued.
Paray	Indonesia	The ferry was severely damaged by fire at Jagoh.

=== Unknown date ===
List of shipwrecks: 29 May 2018
Ship	State	Description
Jernas	Bahrain	Broke free of its anchorage during a cyclone near the Port of Salalah, Oman and was swept ashore to a small cove along the country's mountainous coastline.

== June ==
=== 6 June ===
List of shipwrecks: 6 June 2018
Ship	State	Description
HMBS Yellow Elder	Bahamas	The 108-foot (33 m), Protector-class patrol vessel was sunk as an artificial reef for diving.

=== 13 June ===
List of shipwrecks: 13 June 2018
Ship	State	Description
Pathara Marine 6	Thailand	The coastal container ship capsized and sank off Ko Si Chang Island.

=== 14 June ===
List of shipwrecks: 14 June 2018
Ship	State	Description
19 Winner	Fiji	The tanker was driven aground by a storm off Kaohsiung. Refloated on 2 July 2018.
Arista	Indonesia	The fishing boat capsized and sank off Barrang Lompo Island north of Makassar Sulawesi. 13 dead, 22 or 24 rescued, 8 missing.
Shine Luck	Panama	The tanker was driven aground by a storm off Kaohsiung.

=== 15 June ===
List of shipwrecks: 15 June 2018
Ship	State	Description
Twin Capes	United States	The retired 320-foot (97.5 m) motor ferry, formerly part of the Cape May-Lewes Ferry fleet, was scuttled in the North Atlantic Ocean east of Bethany Beach, Delaware, in 120 feet (37 m) of water at 38°30.90′N 074°30.90′W to form part of the Del-Jersey-Land Inshore Artificial Reef.

=== 18 June ===
List of shipwrecks: 18 June 2018
Ship	State	Description
Sinar Bangun	Indonesia	During a voyage from Simanindo Harbour on Samosir Island to Tiga Ras Harbour in Simalungun Regency on Lake Toba in North Sumatra on Sumatra in Indonesia with 188 passengers and crew aboard, the motor ferry capsized and sank, leaving at least 94 people missing. During the first hours after the accident, 18 people were rescued and one body was recovered; later three more bodies were recovered from the sunken ferry.

=== 22 June ===
List of shipwrecks: 22 June 2018
Ship	State	Description
"Crusader"	United Kingdom	The 16.93-metre (55.5 ft) former trawler, being converted into a private use vessel, sank at dock in shallow water partially submerged at Scarborough, England. Raised and conversion continued.

=== 23 June ===
List of shipwrecks: 23 June 2018
Ship	State	Description
Everglades	United States	The tug was sunk as an artificial reef, 9 nautical miles (17 km; 10 mi) off Ponce de Leon Inlet, Volusia County, Florida.
Lady Philomena	Tanzania	The cargo ship was sunk as an artificial reef, 9 nautical miles (17 km; 10 mi) off Ponce de Leon Inlet, Volusia County, Florida.
YOGN-82	Canada	The 375-foot (114 m), 6,600-ton, concrete-hulled tanker barge was sunk as an artificial reef in the Powell River, British Columbia, Canada.

=== 24 June ===
List of shipwrecks: 24 June 2018
Ship	State	Description
Thorco Lineage	Philippines	The cargo ship ran aground on Raroia (15°56′S 142°19′E). Refloated on 27 June 2018 by Bouganville (French Navy).

=== 29 June ===
List of shipwrecks: 29 June 2018
Ship	State	Description
HMAS Tobruk	Royal Australian Navy	The decommissioned modified Round Table-class heavy landing ship was scuttled to create a recreational diving site in the Coral Sea off the Fraser Coast of Queensland, Australia, halfway between Bundaberg and Hervey Bay.

== July ==
=== 2 July ===
List of shipwrecks: 2 July 2018
Ship	State	Description
SSL Kolkata	India	The container ship sank in shallow water (21°26′N 88°47′E), only partially submerged, near Sundarbans near the India-Bangladesh border after catching fire and being abandoned three weeks earlier.

=== 4 July ===
List of shipwrecks: 4 July 2018
Ship	State	Description
Lestari Maju	Indonesia	The ferry began foundering in heavy weather causing the captain to run the ship aground on a reef to prevent sinking in deep water. She later sank off Sulawesi with the loss of 31 lives, while 130 people aboard were rescued.
Shokei Maru No. 11	Japan	The cargo ship was driven aground by a storm off Higashidori on the northeast coast of Honshu, Japan. A helicopter rescued her entire crew of five.

=== 5 July ===
List of shipwrecks: 5 July 2018
Ship	State	Description
Phoenix		The cruise ship/dive boat sank due to high wave action off Phuket, Thailand. Thirty-three people on board died and 23 were reported missing, while 48 were rescued.
Serenita		The yacht sank due to high wave action off Koh Mai Thon off Phuket, Thailand. All 42 people aboard were rescued.

=== 6 July ===
List of shipwrecks: 6 July 2018
Ship	State	Description
Ste. Claire	United States	The laid-up 870-gross ton passenger steamer burned without loss of life while docked in the Detroit River in Michigan. As of 2019, the vessel is docked at Riverside Marina in Detroit.

=== 9 July ===
List of shipwrecks: 9 July 2018
Ship	State	Description
Pazifik	Germany	The liquefied petroleum gas carrier ran aground in the Sunda Strait (08°29′S 119°20′E) between Pulau Sangeang and Paulau Bantu, Indonesia. She was refloated on 14 July.

=== 10 July ===
List of shipwrecks: 10 July 2018
Ship	State	Description
Christiane Deymann I	Germany	The 183-metre (600 ft) self propelled barge ran aground on the Rhine River near Diehl, Germany in shallow water. Refloated on 12 July after lightering.
Christiane Deymann II	Germany	The barge ran aground on the Rhine River near Diehl, Germany while being towed by Christiane Deymann I (Germany). Refloated on 11 July after lightering.

=== 11 July ===
List of shipwrecks: 11 July 2018
Ship	State	Description
Dorneda	Spain	The fishing trawler capsized and sank in the South Atlantic Ocean 200 nautical miles (370 km) off Argentina at 45°08′S 60°11′W. Twenty-five members of her crew were rescued, one was killed, and one was reported missing.

=== 12 July ===
List of shipwrecks: 12 July 2018
Ship	State	Description
USS Racine	United States Navy	The decommissioned Newport-class tank landing ship was sunk as a target in the Pacific Ocean 55 nautical miles (102 km) north of Kauaʻi, Hawaii, by a Harpoon missile fired by a Royal Australian Air Force P-8A Poseidon aircraft and a torpedo fired by the submarine USS Olympia (United States Navy).

=== 15 July ===
List of shipwrecks: 15 July 2018
Ship	State	Description
Ikan Kerapu	Panama	The bulk carrier ran aground in the Irbe Strait between the Baltic Sea and the Gulf of Riga at 57°46′N 21°43′E.

=== 18 July ===
List of shipwrecks: 18 July 2018
Ship	State	Description
Priscilla	Netherlands	The cargo ship ran aground on the Pentland Skerries off the north coast of Scotland. She was on a voyage from Klaipėda, Lithuania to Silloth, Cumbria, England. She was refloated on 23 July.

=== 19 July ===
List of shipwrecks: 19 July 2018
Ship	State	Description
USS McClusky	United States Navy	The decommissioned Oliver Hazard Perry-class guided-missile frigate was sunk as a target in the Pacific Ocean 55 nmi (102 km; 63 mi) north of Kauai, Hawaii.

=== 20 July ===
List of shipwrecks: 20 July 2018
Ship	State	Description
Commando	Netherlands	The 19.7-metre (65 ft) tugboat sank in the Oude Maas near the Botlek Bridge at Hoogvliet, she was probably pulled down when her tow, Sara, sank. Her two crew were rescued.
Sara	Unknown	The 17-metre (56 ft) sailing vessel sank in the Oude Maas near the Botlek Bridge at Hoogvliet, probably pulled down when her tow vessel, Commando, sank. She was unmanned.

=== 23 July ===
List of shipwrecks: 23 July 2018
Ship	State	Description
Makassar Highway	Panama	Carrying a cargo of 1,352 cars on a voyage to Södertälje, Sweden, the 139-metre (456 ft) K Line car carrier ran aground in an archipelago in the Baltic Sea off the east coast of Sweden, north of Vastervik.

=== 25 July ===
List of shipwrecks: 25 July 2018
Ship	State	Description
KM Eka Sari II	Indonesia	The fishing vessel was driven ashore by a storm at Cilacap, Java, Indonesia.

=== 26 July ===
List of shipwrecks: 26 July 2018
Ship	State	Description
101 Kumyang	South Korea	The longline fishing vessel sank after colliding with the vessel 803 Tong Young (South Korea) in the North Pacific Ocean 270 nautical miles (500 km; 310 mi) southeast of Hokkaido, Japan. Thirty-five of her crew were rescued and three were reported missing.
Lavr	Belize	The cargo ship ran aground in the Don River estuary in Russia.
Xin Yi Yi	Hong Kong	The 43.6-metre (143 ft) live fish transport struck a wreck known as "Kepal Simen" and sank in shallow water partially above water 4 kilometres (2.5 mi) off Penang's south coast.

== August ==
=== 2 August ===
List of shipwrecks: 2 August 2018
Ship	State	Description
Liputan XII	Indonesia	The ferry was driven aground by strong wind near Gilimanuk, Bali, Indonesia.

=== 3 August ===
List of shipwrecks: 3 August 2018
Ship	State	Description
BBC Lagos	Antigua and Barbuda	The cargo ship ran aground in the Kattegat south of Helsinborg, Sweden.

=== 6 August ===
List of shipwrecks: 6 August 2018
Ship	State	Description
Tallink Autoexpress 2	Venezuela	The laid-up ferry sank due to a lack of maintenance at her dock at Guanta or Puerto la Cruz, Venezuela.

=== 8 August ===
List of shipwrecks: 8 August 2018
Ship	State	Description
Amur 2507	Palau	The cargo ship ran aground in the Don River in Russia.

=== 10 August ===
List of shipwrecks: 10 August 2018
Ship	State	Description
Chia Ming No.2	Taiwan	The cargo ship was driven onto the mole at the entrance to the port of Budai, Taiwan, by a storm.

=== 12 August ===
List of shipwrecks: 12 August 2018
Ship	State	Description
Jerlyn Lily	Unknown	The cargo ship was driven ashore during a storm near Legazpi, Albay, on Luzon in the Philippines.
Umiavut	Canada	The cargo ship ran aground in the St. Lawrence River upstream from Trois-Rivières, Quebec, Canada.

=== 15 August ===
List of shipwrecks: 15 August 2018
Ship	State	Description
KMP Bandeng	Indonesia	The ferry foundered in heavy swells off Loloda, Halmahera, Indonesia. Forty-five people on board were rescued, but five crew members and one passenger were left missing.

=== 16 August ===
List of shipwrecks: 16 August 2018
Ship	State	Description
Mekhanik Kottsov	Russia	The cargo ship ran aground in the White Sea at the entrance to the harbor at Onega, Russia.

=== 17 August ===
List of shipwrecks: 17 August 2018
Ship	State	Description
Andros Jet	Cyprus	The ferry ran aground in the harbor at Andros Island, Greece.

=== 18 August ===
List of shipwrecks: 18 August 2018
Ship	State	Description
Darwin	Antigua and Barbuda	The cargo ship ran aground in the Little Belt south of Kolding, Denmark.
Volgoneft 165	Russia	The tanker ran aground on the Volga River in the Astrakhan Oblast in Russia.

=== 23 August ===
List of shipwrecks: 23 August 2018
Ship	State	Description
An Li 669	Panama	The cargo ship was driven ashore during a storm south of the entrance to the harbor at Kaohsiung, Taiwan. She later was refloated.
Chang Long 68	Panama	The cargo ship was driven ashore during a storm north of the entrance to the harbor at Kaohsiung Taiwan. Ten members of her crew were rescued by helicopter. She later was refloated.
Dragonaria	Palau	The tanker was driven ashore on the South Mole at the entrance to the harbor at Kaohsiung, Taiwan. She later was refloated.
Flying Dragon	Unknown	The cargo ship was driven ashore during a storm north of Kaohsiung, Taiwan. All 19 crew members were rescued by helicopter.
Jin Hua	Sierra Leone	The container ship was driven ashore during a storm north of Kaohsiung, Taiwan. She later was refloated.
Shun Hong	Unknown	The cargo ship was driven ashore during a storm north of the entrance to the harbor at Kaohsiung, Taiwan. She later was refloated.
Tai Cang Hu 1	Panama	The cargo ship was driven ashore during a storm south of the entrance to the harbor at Kaohsiung, Taiwan. Nineteen crew members were rescued by helicopter. She later was refloated.
Unlimited 2	Panama	The container ship was driven ashore during a storm north of Kaohsiung, Taiwan.

=== 24 August ===
List of shipwrecks: 24 August 2018
Ship	State	Description
Akademik Ioffe	Russia	The 117-metre (384 ft) passenger ship, operated by One Ocean Expeditions, ran aground in western Gulf of Boothia near Kugaaruk (29°43′N 91°21′W), Nunavut, Canada, with 160 people aboard and began to take on water, but was in no danger of sinking. Two Canadian Coast Guard icebreakers Akademik Ioffe′s sister ship Akademik Sergey Vavilov (Russia) assisted her. By 25 August she had been refloated.
Gleamstar	Marshall Islands	The bulk carrier ran aground in the Paraná River in South America.
Penobscot	United States	The tugboat, derelict since Hurricane Mathew struck in 2016, was sunk as an artificial reef in the Atlantic Ocean off Martin County, Florida.

=== 25 August ===
List of shipwrecks: 25 August 2018
Ship	State	Description
Svartlöga	Denmark	The yacht sank in a storm in the North Sea off Ijmuiden, the Netherlands. Eleven people on board were rescued by the Royal Netherlands Sea Rescue Institution Ijmuiden lifeboat (Netherlands).

=== 27 August ===
List of shipwrecks: 27 August 2018
Ship	State	Description
Sam Rutulangi PB 1600	Indonesia	The cargo ship broke loose from her tug while under tow to a scrapyard in Bangladesh. She drifted aground in the Gulf of Mataban 7 nautical miles (13 km) off Thongwa Township, Myanmar, and partially sank.

=== 29 August ===
List of shipwrecks: 29 August 2018
Ship	State	Description
BRP Gregorio del Pilar	Philippine Navy	The Gregorio del Pilar-class frigate ran aground on Half Moon Reef in the Spratly Islands in the South China Sea. She was refloated on 3 September.

=== 30 August ===
List of shipwrecks: 30 August 2018
Ship	State	Description
Wan Hai 502	China	The container ship ran aground on a reef in the Karimata Strait in the South China Sea at 01°13′S 135°50′E. She was still aground as of 7 September.

== September ==
=== 2 September ===
List of shipwrecks: 2 September 2018
Ship	State	Description
Kanchana Noree	Thailand	The bulk carrier ran aground in the Rio de la Plata on the coast of South America. She was refloated on 3 September.

=== 3 September ===
List of shipwrecks: 3 September 2018
Ship	State	Description
Star Liberty	Nauru	The cargo ship was driven ashore by a storm at Jose de Buenavista on Panay in the Philippines.

=== 4 September ===
List of shipwrecks: 4 September 2018
Ship	State	Description
NRP Afonso Cerqueira	Portuguese Navy	The decommissioned corvette was scuttled off Madeira Island south of Cabo Girão as a dive site and artificial reef.
Arslanbey	Panama	The cargo ship ran aground in the Black Sea on Evia Island. She later was refloated.
Glad Mark	Panama	The bulk carrier ran aground in the Rio de la Plata on the coast of South America at 35°10′S 96°31′W. She still was aground as of 5 September.
Houn Maru No.2	Japan	Typhoon Jebi: The typhoon drove the tanker ashore at Osaka, Japan.

=== 6 September ===
List of shipwrecks: 6 September 2018
Ship	State	Description
Haida Legend	Canada	While fishing for halibut, the 45-foot (13.7 m) fishing vessel sank 20 nautical miles (37 km; 23 mi) off Langara Island, British Columbia, Canada. Her entire crew survived.

=== 7 September ===
List of shipwrecks: 7 September 2018
Ship	State	Description
Wan Tong 158	China	The cargo ship ran aground on a reef in the South China Sea 1 nautical mile (1.9 km; 1.2 mi) south of Chiyu Island off Shantou, China.

=== 8 September ===
List of shipwrecks: 8 September 2018
Ship	State	Description
Squall	Russia	The tug foundered in a storm in the Kerch Strait. Her entire crew of seven survived.

=== 11 September ===
List of shipwrecks: 11 September 2018
Ship	State	Description
Tientsin	Hong Kong	The bulk carrier ran aground in the Paraná River near Ramallo, Argentina. She was refloated on 12 September.

=== 12 September ===
List of shipwrecks: 12 September 2018
Ship	State	Description
Kapitan Permyakov	Russia	The tanker ran aground in the Don River in Russia at the 3116-kilometer mark.
Planeo	Russia	The tanker ran aground in the Volga River in Russia at the 2829-kilometer mark. She refloated herself.

=== 13 September ===
List of shipwrecks: 13 September 2018
Ship	State	Description
Sormovskiy 123	Moldova	The cargo ship ran aground in dense fog in the Don River estuary in Russia.

=== 14 September ===
List of shipwrecks: 14 September 2018
Ship	State	Description
KM Fungka Permata V	Indonesia	The ferry caught fire and sank in the Banda Sea south of Banggai Island, Indonesia, at 02°00′S 123°22′E. One hundred fifteen passengers and 11 crew members survived, ten people were killed, and eight were left missing.

=== 15 September ===
List of shipwrecks: 15 September 2018
Ship	State	Description
Princess Vanessa	Philippines	Typhoon Mangkhut: The typhoon driven the cargo ship off the shore of Manila Bay in Tanza, Cavite, Philippines.

=== 16 September ===
List of shipwrecks: 16 September 2018
Ship	State	Description
Tumberry	Unknown	Typhoon Mangkhut: The typhoon drove the yacht ashore at Hong Kong, China.

=== 20 September ===
List of shipwrecks: 20 September 2018
Ship	State	Description
Nyerere	Tanzania	During a voyage on Lake Victoria from Bugalora Island to Ukara Island, Tanzania, with over 400 passengers aboard, the overloaded motor ferry capsized and sank between Ukerewe Island and Ukara Island, 50 metres (55 yd) from the pier on Ukara Island, killing 224 people.

=== 21 September ===
List of shipwrecks: 21 September 2018
Ship	State	Description
Ashtabula	United States	The barge ran aground while being towed by the tug Defiance (United States) in stormy conditions in the Mackinac Strait between Mackinac Island and Round Island, Michigan.
Defiance	United States	The tug ran aground in stormy conditions in the Mackinac Strait between Mackinac Island and Round Island, Michigan. She floated free on 22 September.
Sormovskiy 48	Saint Kitts and Nevis	The cargo ship ran aground in the Sea of Azov in the Azov-Don Channel west of the Don River estuary.

=== 22 September ===
List of shipwrecks: 22 September 2018
Ship	State	Description
Gazpromneft Zuid-West	Russia	The bunker tanker ran aground in the Black Sea near Novorossiysk, Russia.
Osfjord	Norway	The coaster ran aground off Linesoya, near Trondheim, Norway. All four members of her crew were airlifted to safety.

=== 25 September ===
List of shipwrecks: 25 September 2018
Ship	State	Description
Hao Xiang 19	China	The cargo ship ran aground in a storm on a reef off Luxi Island east of Wenzhou, China, and capsized and sank. Her entire crew of 13 survived.

=== 26 September ===
List of shipwrecks: 26 September 2018
Ship	State	Description
Sabuk Nusantara 35	Indonesia	The ferry ran aground three nautical miles (5.6 km) south of Singkil (02°14′N 97°47′E) in Aceh Province on Sumatra in Indonesia.

=== 28 September ===
List of shipwrecks: 28 September 2018
Ship	State	Description
Merathus Kendari 1	Indonesia	2018 Sulawesi earthquake and tsunami: A tsunami drove the container ship ashore at Donggala, Palu, Sulawesi, Indonesia. She was refloated by 29 September.
Sabuk Nusantara 39	Indonesia	2018 Sulawesi earthquake and tsunami: A tsunami drove the ferry ashore at Donggala.

=== 30 September ===
List of shipwrecks: 30 September 2018
Ship	State	Description
Alta	Tanzania	Alta stranded on the coast of County Cork, Ireland, February 2020. The cargo ship was abandoned in the Atlantic Ocean 1,300 nautical miles (2,400 km) south east of Bermuda after drifting disabled for 20 days while en route from Greece to Haiti. Her ten crew were rescued by the United States Coast Guard, while the crippled ship was left adrift. She was spotted adrift, still afloat, by HMS Protector on 30 August 2019. Alta came ashore on the coast of County Cork, Ireland during Storm Dennis on 16 February 2020.

== October ==
=== 1 October ===
List of shipwrecks: 1 October 2018
Ship	State	Description
Marina	Belize	Typhoon Trami: The cargo ship dragged her anchor and was driven ashore on the breakwater at Kawasaki, Japan.

=== 3 October ===
List of shipwrecks: 3 October 2018
Ship	State	Description
Ying Hai	Sierra Leone	The container ship sank south of the Penghu Archipelago in the Taiwan Strait at 22°45′N 119°10′E).

=== 5 October ===
List of shipwrecks: 5 October 2018
Ship	State	Description
Griftbor	Antigua and Barbuda	The cargo ship ran aground near Hargshamn, Sweden.

=== 6 October ===
List of shipwrecks: 6 October 2018
Ship	State	Description
Chang Sheng 3	China	The cargo ship sank after colliding with a fishing vessel off Ningbo, China. Eleven members of her crew were rescued by another fishing vessel.

=== 10 October ===
List of shipwrecks: 10 October 2018
Ship	State	Description
El Dorado	United States	Hurricane Michael: The out of service cruise ship broke free from her dock in Cooked Creek, blew across West Bay and was driven ashore partially sunk and on her port side on the shore of St. Andrews Bay, Florida near the Florida State University Panama City campus. Work to right and refloat the ship started in mid January. She was sunk as an artificial reef 12 nautical miles (22 km) south of the entrance to St. Andrew's Bay on 3 May 2019.
Governor Stone	United States	Hurricane Michael: The sailing vessel capsized and sank in St. Andrews Marina in Panama City, Florida during the hurricane. Later raised and stored ashore. Rebuilding to start in May/June of 2022 at Stone Loft Boat Inc., St Andrews, Fla., ending date projected for 2023.

=== 11 October ===
List of shipwrecks: 11 October 2018
Ship	State	Description
Zhen Feng	Honduras	The cargo ship was beached off Taoyuan, Taiwan, to prevent her from sinking after she sprang a leak.

=== 13 October ===
List of shipwrecks: 13 October 2018
Ship	State	Description
Fom	Panama	The cargo ship capsized and sank in the Black Sea 50 nautical miles (93 km) off Sevastopol, Crimea, Ukraine. The vessel Minerva Marina (Greece) rescued eight members of her crew.

=== 15 October ===
List of shipwrecks: 15 October 2018
Ship	State	Description
ADM	United States	The shrimp-fishing vessel ran aground off Ormond Beach, Florida. She was pulled off the beach on 31 October and towed to Jacksonville, Florida, for repairs.
Sila Sibiri	Russia	The sailing yacht was driven ashore by a storm at Palma, Mallorca, in the Balearic Islands.

=== 17 October ===
List of shipwrecks: 17 October 2018
Ship	State	Description
Nevskiy 31	Russia	The hopper barge ran aground on the southern tip of Seskar Island in the eastern Gulf of Finland.

=== 18 October ===
List of shipwrecks: 18 October 2018
Ship	State	Description
Bonito	Honduras	The coastal boat capsized and sank in the Caribbean Sea 60 nautical miles (110 km) north of the Caratasca Bar. Seventy-six of the people on board survived, two were killed, and several were left missing.

=== 22 October ===
List of shipwrecks: 22 October 2018
Ship	State	Description
Filyoz	Liberia	The tanker ran aground in the Uruguay River in South America at the 177-kilometer mark, downstream from Concepción del Uruguay, Uruguay.

=== 25 October ===
List of shipwrecks: 25 October 2018
Ship	State	Description
Unidentified tug	Unknown	The tug sank in the Gulf of Khambhat while assisting the vessel Voyage Sympathy (Kiribati) on her sea trials. Six members of her crew survived and one was left missing.

=== Unknown date ===
List of shipwrecks: Unknown date October 2018
Ship	State	Description
Suegno	Italy	The yacht sank in a storm while at a marina on the Ligurian coast of Italy.

== November ==
=== 3 November ===
List of shipwrecks: 3 November 2018
Ship	State	Description
Miętus 2	Poland	The fishing vessel sank after colliding with the vessel Begonia S (Cook Islands) off Bornholm Island in the Baltic Sea. Three crew members and 16 fishermen who had been aboard her were rescued by Danish search-and-rescue personnel.

=== 8 November ===
List of shipwrecks: 8 November 2018
Ship	State	Description
HNoMS Helge Ingstad	Royal Norwegian Navy	The Fridtjof Nansen-class frigate was grounded intentionally to prevent her from sinking after she collided with the tanker Sola TS (Malta) in the Hjeltefjord near Bergen, Norway, and was left with a severe list and her propulsion systems underwater. Sola TS was able to return to port. Eight people were injured in the collision. Helge Ingstad slid deeper in the water on 11 November, leaving only her upper superstructure above water. Later raised and scrapped.

=== 9 November ===
List of shipwrecks: 9 November 2018
Ship	State	Description
Anatoliy Krasheninnikov	Russia	The cargo ship sank in Kambalnyy Bay in the Sea of Okhotsk north of the First Kurile Strait. Ten members of her crew were rescued and three were left missing.

=== 10 November ===
List of shipwrecks: 10 November 2018
Ship	State	Description
SAS De Mist	South African Navy	The decommissioned tug sank while tied up at a pier at Simon's Town, South Africa.

=== 15 November ===
List of shipwrecks: 15 November 2018
Ship	State	Description
Koravi	Albania	The cargo ship ran aground near Dakato Lighthouse on Lefkoda Island, Greece. Eight members of her crew were rescued. She was refloated later that day and towed off.

=== 16 November ===
List of shipwrecks: 16 November 2018
Ship	State	Description
Veera Prem	India	Cyclone Gaja: The hopper dredge was driven aground on the Nagapattinam coast of Tamil Nadu, India, in the Bay of Bengal.

=== 17 November ===
List of shipwrecks: 17 November 2018
Ship	State	Description
CCGS Corporal McLaren M.M.V.	Canadian Coast Guard	While undergoing a refit at a shipyard in Sambro, Nova Scotia, Canada, the Hero-class patrol vessel was released from its cradle and sank after sliding down the slip, becoming partially submerged.
Hongtai 16	China	The cargo ship capsized and sank in the South China Sea off Guangdong Province, China. All 11 crew members were rescued by helicopter.
Two unidentified coasters	Turkey	While awaiting scrapping, the two coasters drifted aground after dragging their anchors near Yalova, Turkey, on the coast of the Sea of Marmara.

=== 20 November ===
List of shipwrecks: 20 November 2018
Ship	State	Description
Durban Queen	Saint Kitts and Nevis	The asphalt tanker capsized and sank in the Persian Gulf east of Qatar. Twelve members of her crew were rescued by a French Navy frigate.

=== 22 November ===
List of shipwrecks: 22 November 2018
Ship	State	Description
Multi Prima 1	Indonesia	The cargo ship sank in the Flores Sea near Bali, Indonesia. Seven members of her crew were rescued by the vessel Cahaya Abadi 201 (Indonesia); seven other crew members were left missing.
Orel 3	Ukraine	The cargo ship was beached in the Dnieper River near Zaporozhe, Ukraine, to prevent her from sinking after a hull breach.
VD 3751	Russia	The barge sank in the Sea of Azov at the entrance to the Kerch Strait.

=== 24 November ===
List of shipwrecks: 24 November 2018
Ship	State	Description
Templa	Uganda	The motor vessel, operating as an unlicensed party boat and overcrowded with nearly 100 people on board, capsized and sank in Lake Victoria just off a beach resort near Mukono Town, Uganda, during a pleasure cruise. At least 32 people drowned and at least 40 were unaccounted for; it was unclear which of the latter may have died and which had made it to shore and left the scene. There were 26 known survivors.

=== 26 November ===
List of shipwrecks: 26 November 2018
Ship	State	Description
Hua Yuan 9999	China	The container ship collided with the vessel Puhui 1 (China) in the Yangtze River in China near Taicang Buoy 7 near the Shanghai Channel fairway and sank.

== December ==
=== 22 December ===
List of shipwrecks: 22 December 2018
Ship	State	Description
Dredge 200	United States	The 90 foot dredging barge capsized and sank in 100 feet of water in Massachusetts Bay after breaking loose from her tow "Big Jake" (United States).
R. E. Pierson	United States	The work boat was lost in Massachusetts Bay after breaking loose from her tow "Big Jake" (United States).

=== 5 December ===
List of shipwrecks: 5 December 2018
Ship	State	Description
DHL Starlight	United Kingdom	During the 2018 Golden Globe Race, the 35.33-foot (10.77 m) Rustler 36 Masthead yacht was flipped end-over-end, dismasted, and swamped during a storm in the Southern Ocean approximately 2,000 nautical miles (3,700 km) west of Cape Horn. Her only occupant, Susie Goodall, declared her a total loss. The 40,000 GT, 119-metre (390 ft) motor cargo vessel Tian Fu (Hong Kong) rescued Goodall from the wreck on 7 December.

=== 7 December ===
List of shipwrecks: 7 December 2018
Ship	State	Description
Viking	Tunisia	The tug was driven ashore by heavy weather near Malata, Crete. Eight members of her crew were rescued.

=== 8 December ===
List of shipwrecks: 8 December 2018
Ship	State	Description
Rui Xing Lun	China	The cargo ship ran aground in the Bohai Sea northwest of Weifang, China. She broke in two with her aft section sinking. Nine members of her crew were rescued and one was left missing; one of the rescued crew members died later.
Yu Hong 998	China	The cargo ship capsized in the Yangtze River near Wanzhou, China. Five members of her crew were left missing.

=== 9 December ===
List of shipwrecks: 9 December 2018
Ship	State	Description
Makmur	Indonesia	The coaster was sunk in a collision, possibly with the vessel Breeze (Kuwait), in the Singapore Strait. Eleven members of her crew were rescued; four were injured.

=== 17 December ===
List of shipwrecks: 17 December 2018
Ship	State	Description
Green Ocean	Bahamas	The refrigerated cargo ship suffered a steering failure while leaving Vilagarcia, Spain, and ran aground. She was towed off later that day.

=== 18 December ===
List of shipwrecks: 18 December 2018
Ship	State	Description
Kuzma Minin	Russia	The bulk carrier drifted ashore during the morning at Swanpool Beach, Cornwall, England, after dragging her anchor in heavy weather. She was pulled off the beach in the early evening.

=== 19 December ===
List of shipwrecks: 19 December 2018
Ship	State	Description
Natalia	Comoros	The cargo ship ran aground in rough seas in the Black Sea off Turkey during a voyage from Russia to Istanbul, Turkey. Sixteen members of her crew were rescued by Turkish coastal emergency teams.

=== 22 December ===
List of shipwrecks: 22 December 2018
Ship	State	Description
Sibel D	Panama	The cargo ship ran aground while leaving the port of Nafplion, Greece.

=== 24 December ===
List of shipwrecks: 24 December 2018
Ship	State	Description
Yusheng 366	China	The cargo ship collided with the vessel CMA CGM Norma (France) and sank in the Pearl River estuary 20 nautical miles (37 km; 23 mi) southeast of Hong Kong, China.

=== 25 December ===
List of shipwrecks: 25 December 2018
Ship	State	Description
Amanda	Palau	The deck cargo ship suffered a steering failure in the Singapore Strait three nautical miles (5.6 km; 3.5 mi) east of Tajung Sepang, Malaysia, collided with another ship, capsized, and sank. Six members of her crew were rescued and three were left missing.
Surov	Russia	The cargo ship ran aground in heavy weather at Mys Zheleznyy Rog on the Taman Peninsula on the Black Sea coast of Russia.

=== 26 December ===
List of shipwrecks: 26 December 2018
Ship	State	Description
Dahaihong	China	The coaster sank in heavy weather in the East China Sea south of Shanghai off Zhoushan, China. All four crew members were rescued by the vessel Donghaijiu 117 (China).
Fan Yang 68	China	The coaster sank in heavy weather in the East China Sea south of Shanghai off Zhoushan, China. All seven members crew rescued by the vessel Donghaijiu 117 (China).
Guo Shun 8669	China	The coaster sank in heavy weather in the East China Sea south of Shanghai off Zhoushan, China. All five members of her crew were rescued by the vessel Donghaijiu 117 (China).
JBB Yu Hang 67	China	The hopper dredge was abandoned after she capsized in the Bohai Sea off Liaoning, China. All 12 members of her crew were rescued by helicopter.

=== 28 December ===
List of shipwrecks: 28 December 2018
Ship	State	Description
Yi Cheng 1	China	The coaster dragged her anchor and was driven ashore by a storm on Nanri Island in the Taiwan Strait. All 13 crew members made it to the island and were evacuated by helicopter.

=== 31 December ===
List of shipwrecks: 31 December 2018
Ship	State	Description
Maria Rosario	Venezuela	The laid-up ferry sank, partially submerged, due to a lack of maintenance at her dock at Puerto la Cruz, Venezuela.
Sincerity Ace	Panama	During a voyage from Japan to Honolulu, Hawaii, with a cargo of approximately 3,500 Nissan automobiles and a crew of 21 on board, the 650-foot (198.1 m) car carrier was abandoned in the North Pacific Ocean approximately 1,800 nautical miles (3,300 km) northwest of Hawaii after she caught fire and lost power in 15-to-18-foot (4.6 to 5.5 m) seas. Sixteen of her crew were rescued by other merchant ships; five who went overboard after experiencing trouble launching a life raft in 17-foot (5.2 m) seas were presumed lost, with one of them missing and the other four found unresponsive in the water and unable to grab onto lifesaving gear deployed by the responding merchant ships, which had no other means of bringing them aboard.

=== 28 December ===
List of shipwrecks: Unknown December 2018
Ship	State	Description
Namse Bangdzod	Indonesia	The tanker was reported missing 28 December with a crew of 11. The vessel's last known location was in the Java Sea.
