= Cromwell (disambiguation) =

Oliver Cromwell (1599–1658) was an English military and political leader and later Lord Protector of the Commonwealth of England, Scotland and Ireland.

Cromwell may also refer to:

== People ==
- Cromwell (surname)

== Places ==
- Cromwell, New South Wales, Australia
- Cromwell, Nottinghamshire, England
- Cromwell, New Zealand

=== United States ===
- Cromwell, Alabama
- Cromwell, Connecticut
- Cromwell, Indiana
- Cromwell, Iowa
- Cromwell, Kentucky
- Cromwell, Minnesota
- Cromwell, Oklahoma
- Cromwell, Washington
- Cromwell Township, Clay County, Minnesota
- Cromwell Township, Huntingdon County, Pennsylvania

== Entertainment ==
- Cromwell (film), from 1970, starring Richard Harris
- Cromwell (play), by Victor Hugo
- Cromwell (tragedy), an 1820 verse tragedy by Honoré de Balzac

== Ships ==
- USS Cromwell (DE-1014), United States Navy ocean escort ship
- NOAAS Townsend Cromwell (R 443), an American fisheries research ship

== Other uses ==
- Baron Cromwell, a peerage of England
- Cromwell (computing), replacement firmware for the Microsoft Xbox
- Cromwell College, a residential college of the University of Queensland in St Lucia, Queensland, Australia
- Cromwell Current, in the Pacific Ocean
- The Cromwell Las Vegas, a boutique hotel in Las Vegas, Nevada, US
- Cromwell tank, a series of British tanks from World War II
- Cromwell (board game), a board wargame published 1976

== See also ==
- Oliver Cromwell (disambiguation)
- Cromwellian (disambiguation)
