= Shanghai University USV =

Series of unmanned surface vehicles

Jinghai (精海, meaning Precision Sea) USVs are a series unmanned surface vehicles developed by Shanghai University, and as end of 2021, a total of eight models have been identified:

== Jinghai 1 ==
Jinghai 1 USV is the first member of Jinhai series, and it has been deployed by China in surveying islets in South China Sea in 2013, in preparation of the Chinese construction projects on these islets. Jinhai 1 can be fully autonomous in operation. Specification:

- Draft (m): 0.35

== Jinghai 2 ==
Jinghai 2 USV has been in service with Ministry of Transport of the People's Republic of China, and was the first USV carried by Xue Long in its expedition to Antarctica in 2014.

== Jinghai 3 ==
Jinghai 3 USV has been in service with State Oceanic Administration. Jinghai 3 USV is designed to survey regions with water depth of 2 meters or greater. In 2018, along with Jinghai 7 USV, Jinghai 3 USV was used in the investigation of Sanchi oil tanker collision. Specification:

- Length (m): 6.3
- Beam (m): 2.8
- Draft (m): 0.9

== Jinghai 4 ==
Jinghai 4 USV is developed to perform survey mission in harbors, lakes, rivers, reservoirrs and coastal waters, and it can be fully autonomous for remotely controlled while in operation.

== Jinghai 6 ==
Jinghai 6 USV is developed to perform oceanographic research and survey tasks, and it can also be deployed in reservoirs for the same task.

== Jinghai 7 ==
Jinghai 7 USV is developed to perform hydrographic survey missions. In 2018, along with Jinghai 3 USV, Jinghai 7 USV was used in the investigation of Sanchi oil tanker collision.

== Jinghai Rainbow ==
Jinghai Rainbow (精海虹) USV is a small USV designed to survey shallow waters with water depth less than 2 meters. Specification:

- Length (m): 1.5
- Draft (m): 0.3
