= Jernas =

Jernas may refer to:

- MV Jernas, a Bahraini vessel shipwrecked off of Dhofar Governorate, Oman
- Jernas, an export version of the Rapier 2000 missile
- JERNAS-M, an Emirati unmanned aerial vehicle
- JERNAS-S, an Emirati unmanned aerial vehicle
- Elsa Jernås (1895–1979), a Swedish graphic artist, painter and costume designer
