= Cromwellian (disambiguation) =

Cromwellian is an adjective relating to Oliver Cromwell (1599–1658), Lord Protector of the Commonwealth of England, and his era

Cromwellian may also refer to:

- Roundhead, a member of the Parliamentarian side of the English Civil War against the Royalists
- Cromwellians, supporters of the Cromwellian Protectorate during the English Interregnum
- The Cromwellian, a 1960s nightclub in London, England, UK

== See also ==
- Cromwell (disambiguation)
- Oliver Cromwell (disambiguation)
