= Sanchi (tanker) =

Oil tanker

History

Panama
- Name: Saman (2008); Sepid (2008–2012); Gardenia (2012); Seahorse (2012–2013); Sanchi (2013–2018)
- Owner: Bright Shipping Ltd, Hong Kong (since 2016)
- Operator: National Iranian Tanker Company
- Port of registry: Malta, Valletta (2008–2012); Tuvalu, Funafuti (2012–2014); Tanzania, Zanzibar (2014–2016); Panama, Panama (2016–2018)
- Ordered: May 20, 2005
- Builder: Hyundai Samho Heavy Industries, South Korea
- Yard number: S316
- Laid down: October 29, 2007
- Launched: February 5, 2008
- Completed: April 24, 2008
- In service: 2008–2018
- Identification: IMO number: 9356608; Call sign: 3FJU8 (from 2016); MMSI number: 356137000 (from 2016)
- Fate: Sank after collision with a Hong Kong flagged cargo ship CF Crystal

General characteristics
- Type: Suezmax crude oil tanker
- Tonnage: 85,462 GT; 53,441 NT; 164,154 DWT
- Displacement: 189,653 tons
- Length: 274.18 m (899 ft 6 in)
- Beam: 50 m (164 ft 1 in)
- Draught: 17 m (55 ft 9 in)
- Depth: 23.1 m (75 ft 9 in)
- Installed power: MAN-B&W 6S70MC-C, 18,660 kW (25,020 bhp)
- Propulsion: Single shaft, fixed pitch propeller
- Speed: 16 knots (30 km/h; 18 mph) (maximum); 15.4 knots (28.5 km/h; 17.7 mph) (service)
- Crew: 32

Sanchi was the final name of a 2008-built Panamanian-flagged Suezmax crude oil tanker that was operated by the National Iranian Tanker Company (NITC) under a variety of ship registries and names. On January 6, 2018, it collided with a cargo ship, CF Crystal in the East China Sea and caught fire with 32 deaths or missing and 130,000 tons of condensate spilled. After drifting for eight days and several explosions Sanchi sank, causing extensive pollution.

== Description ==
Sanchi was a double-hulled crude oil tanker with an overall length of 274.18 metres (899 ft 6 in), beam of 50 metres (160 ft), and full-load draught of 17 metres (55 ft 9 in). With a deadweight tonnage of 164,154 tons, the vessel was a typical Suezmax tanker, a vessel able to transit the Suez Canal in a laden condition. Sanchi was powered by an 18,660-kilowatt (25,020 bhp) MAN-B&W 6S70MC-C slow-speed diesel engine driving a fixed-pitch propeller and giving the tanker a service speed of 15.4 knots (28.5 km/h; 17.7 mph).

== History ==
The ship was built in 2008 by Hyundai Samho Heavy Industries at Yeongam, South Korea, for the National Iranian Tanker Company. It was named Saman but was renamed Sepid one month after delivery. In June 2012, it was renamed Gardenia and reflagged from Malta to Tuvalu. In November 2012, the name was changed to Seahorse and in August 2013, to Sanchi. The vessel was reflagged to Tanzania in April 2014 and to Panama in July 2016.

== 2018 collision ==
On January 6, 2018, Sanchi collided with the cargo ship CF Crystal and caught fire. This occurred 160 nautical miles (300 km) off of Shanghai, China in the East China Sea. Sanchi was travelling from Asaluyeh, Iran, to Daesan, South Korea. It was carrying natural-gas condensate (136,000 tonnes (960,000 barrels)) for South Korean petrochemical company Hanwha Total.

The fire burned for several days and part of the tanker exploded on January 10. After further explosions, Sanchi sank on January 14, 2018. The entire crew of 32 died, with one body recovered from the sea and two from an onboard lifeboat.

Extensive oil slicks were reported and the wreck, containing both cargo and fuel oil, lies in 115 metres (377 ft) of water.
