= Oliver Cromwell (disambiguation) =

Oliver Cromwell (1599–1658) was an English military and political leader and later Lord Protector of the Commonwealth of England, Scotland and Ireland.

Oliver Cromwell may also refer to:

== People ==
- Oliver Cromwell (died 1655) (c. 1562–1655), English landowner, lawyer and politician, uncle of the Lord Protector
- Oliver Cromwell (American soldier) (1752–1853), African-American soldier in the American Revolutionary War
- Oliver Eaton Cromwell (1892–1987), American mountain climber

== Other uses ==
- "Oliver Cromwell" (song), a Monty Python song about the Lord Protector
- BR Standard Class 7 70013 Oliver Cromwell, a steam locomotive
- Oliver Cromwell (ship), the largest ship in the Connecticut State Navy
- MV Oliver Cromwell, a Dutch barge/riverboat/floating hotel
- Oliver Cromwell, a symphony by Rutland Boughton

== See also ==
- Cromwell (disambiguation)
- Cromwellian (disambiguation)
