= Cromwell (surname) =

- Pronunciation: /ˈkrɒmwəl/
- Language: English

Origin
- Language: Old English
- Origin: village Cromwell, Nottinghamshire
- Derivation: crump + wella
- Meaning: 'winding stream'

Cromwell is an English surname.

People with this surname include:

- Adelaide M. Cromwell (1919–2019), American sociologist and historian
- Chad Cromwell (born 1957) American drummer
- Dean Cromwell (1879–1962), American athletic coach
- Elizabeth Cromwell (1598–1665), wife of Oliver Cromwell
- Gavin Cromwell (born 1974), Irish racehorse trainer
- George Cromwell (1860–1934), New York politician
- Gregory Cromwell, 1st Baron Cromwell (c. 1514 – 1551), son of Thomas Cromwell
- Henry Cromwell, 2nd Baron Cromwell (1538–1592), son of Gregory Cromwell
- Henry Williams (alias Cromwell) (1537–1604), Member of Parliament, son of Richard Williams (alias Cromwell)
- Henry Cromwell (1628–1674), Lord Deputy of Ireland, son of Oliver Cromwell
- James Cromwell (born 1940), American actor
- James H. R. Cromwell (1896–1990), American diplomat
- John Cromwell (1887–1979), American film actor, director, and producer
- John P. Cromwell (1901–1943), US Navy Medal of Honor recipient
- Keith Cromwell (born 1979), American professional lacrosse player
- Nolan Cromwell (born 1955), American football player
- Oliver Cromwell (1599–1658), Lord Protector of England, Scotland and Ireland 1653–58, great-great nephew of Thomas Cromwell
- Other persons and items named Oliver Cromwell, see Oliver Cromwell (disambiguation)
- Richard Cromwell (1626–1712), Lord Protector of England, Scotland and Ireland 1658–59, son of Oliver Cromwell
- Ralph de Cromwell, 1st Baron Cromwell (died 1398), English peer
- Ralph Cromwell, 3rd Baron Cromwell (c. 1393 – 1456), English politician and diplomat
- Richard Cromwell (1910–1960), an American actor
- Richard Williams (alias Cromwell)
- Thomas Cromwell, 1st Earl of Essex (c. 1485 – 1540), English statesman in the reign of Henry VIII of England
- Thomas Cromwell (Canadian jurist) (born 1952), Canadian judge
- Townsend Cromwell (1922–1958), American oceanographer
- William Nelson Cromwell (1854–1948), American attorney and co-founder of law firm Sullivan & Cromwell

== See also ==
- Cromwell Dixon (1892–1911), American aviation pioneer
- Cromwell Everson (1925–1991), Afrikaans and South African composer
