= Namse Bangdzod =

Missing Indonesian ship built in 1993

History

Indonesia
- Name: Namse Bangdzod
- Owner: PT. Petronusa Niaga Energy
- Operator: PT. Surabaya Shipping Lines
- Route: Sampit – Port of Tanjung Priok
- Launched: 1993
- Identification: IMO number: 9078517
- Fate: Missing from 27 December 2018 and presumed sunk or hijacked

General characteristics
- Class & type: B
- Type: Generic
- Tonnage: 1128 t
- Length: 246.55 ft (75.15 m)
- Draught: 13.12 ft (4.00 m)
- Speed: 5.2 kn / 6°
- Capacity: 1950 t DWT
- Crew: 11 crew and 1 captain
- Notes: As per MarineTraffic

Namse Bangdzod was a 1,950-ton Indonesian cargo ship-oil tanker that went missing on 28 December 2018. The ship departed on 27 December with 1 million liters of crude palm oil (CPO) from Sampit, Central Kalimantan, towards the Port of Tanjung Priok, Jakarta. She was crewed by 12 crewmembers and a captain, who were last-contacted in the early hours of 28 December.

Namse Bangdzod was expected to arrive within a few days, but authorities lost communication in the coastal area the next day on 28 December 2018, and her whereabouts have never been confirmed.

== Disappearance ==
As the ship was sailing on the pre-planned route between 27 and 28 December, the Indonesian Navy recorded changing positions at multiple times via her automatic identification system, but Namse Bangdzod's whereabouts have never been ascertained after last signal was received. Later, the National Search and Rescue Agency acknowledged that the disappearance of the tanker probably began with a pirate hijack, leading to an unexpected disappearance along with eleven crewmembers and a captain. Her status was officially declared missing on 27 January 2019.

== Later development ==
Maritime transport experts, Indonesian navy, and other official stated various reasons of Namse Bangdzod's disappearance. Maritime declined the presumed-sunk-claims citing, "It is unlikely that the vessel was adrift at sea as the Navy had found no sign of it". The Indonesian navy has also refused to acknowledge the hijacking-claims as they believed the route has no history of piracy and is considered as the safe one.

Indonesian authorities conducted a massive search to find the missing vessel. The search included four warships around the Java Sea, as well as maritime patrol aircraft from Surabaya to the central part of the country. Despite months-long massive searches, it was declared missing on 27 January 2019.
