= Cromwell (board game) =

Board wargame published in 1976

Cromwell, subtitled "Strategic Game of the English Civil War", is a board wargame published by Simulations Design Corporation (SDC) in 1976 that simulates the English Civil War.

== Description ==
Cromwell is a two-player game in which one player controls the Royalist forces, and the other player controls the Parliamentarians. There are three levels of play: Introductory, Level 1 (Basic), and Level 2 (Advanced).

=== Introductory game ===
This uses the same rules as the Basic game, except there are no fortresses or leaders.

=== Level 1 game ===
At the start of the game, each player buys pikemen (1 point each), musketeers (2 points each). and cavalry (2 points each), using the number of points that equals their side's Economic/Political value (EcoPol). These are placed anywhere on the map in friendly territory. This is repeated at the start of every year, except that the Royalist player can never receive fewer than 18 points, and gets bonus points each year as the war progresses.

Each turn represents one month. During the game, the Parliamentary player moves first in Turn 1, but the players then alternate moving first on each successive turn. This means after the Parliamentarian's first turn, each player always has two consecutive turns — the last part of one turn, and the first part of the next turn.

Movement costs 1 per area. When combat happens, the player who controls the territory in which the battle is taking place receives local militia to help them defend.

=== Level 2 game ===
Movement costs more in some areas. The size of forces is hidden from the opposing player. There are rules for fortress sieges, the New Model Army, Irish reinforcements, Scottish intervention, naval actions, and fleet transport.

=== Components ===
The game includes:

- 45 cm x 60 cm paper map of England divided into regions
- 32-page rulebook
- 101 die-cut counters
- Various charts and players' aids

=== Scenarios ===
The game includes four scenarios:

- Introductory game
- 1642 Campaign (historical)
- 1643 Campaign
- 1644 Campaign

== Publication history ==
From 1971 until 1976, SDC produced a line of wargames packaged in ziplock bags called their "Pouch" Series. The tenth "Pouch" series game, published in 1976, was Cromwell, designed by Dana Lombardy.

== Reception ==
In Issue 7 of Perfidious Albion, Charles Vasey and Geoff Barnard exchanged thoughts about the game. Vasey commented, "The game is quite well thought out in many respects but it just does not seem to hang together." Barnard replied, "This game seems to be one of those where the most effective tactics/strategies are invariably highly unrealistic and rarely historical." Vasey concluded, "In spite of this, I am sure that there is a game lurking in there somewhere, it just needs a bit of work. Reading the rules, one occasionally gets the feeling they were written by different people, maybe this is why they do not hang together well." Barnard concluded, "I found the game interesting to play, and the designers must be commended for what detail they did try to include."

In Issue 55 of the UK magazine Games & Puzzles (December 1976), Nick Palmer called Cromwell "an excellent game for beginners as well as experts, because it contains alternative rules which cater for each group." He noted that "If both players become sufficiently familiar with Cromwell to avoid ambushes leading to the sudden defeat of one side, then the game will be decided by the ebb and flow of territorial control, with new elements like the Scots and the Royalist reinforcements entering as the war progresses, a fascinating and delicately-poised struggle that may not be resolved until the final turn." In his book The Comprehensive Guide to Board Wargaming, Palmer called the game a "quietly distinguished simulation of the English Civil War." He concluded that it was "not nail-bitingly gripping, but consistently interesting and challenging."

In The Guide to Simulations/Games for Education and Training, Martin Campion noted "The game seems to be faithful to the strategic problems of the war."

In Issue 28 of Moves, Richard Berg called the game a prime example "of the obscurity and carelessness that creeps into too much of today's rules and development." Berg found the game "physically quite attractive" with a rulebook that was "thick and informative." However, Berg found several ambiguities in the rules, and "a good number of concepts are never fully developed. The combat rules, especially those concerning forts, are hazy to the point of obscurity." He concluded "There is a game lurking in there somewhere, but finding it could well be like getting blood from a turnip."

== Reviews ==
- Panzerfaust and Campaign #74
