= Sanchi oil tanker collision =

2018 Fatal ship sinking in the East China Sea

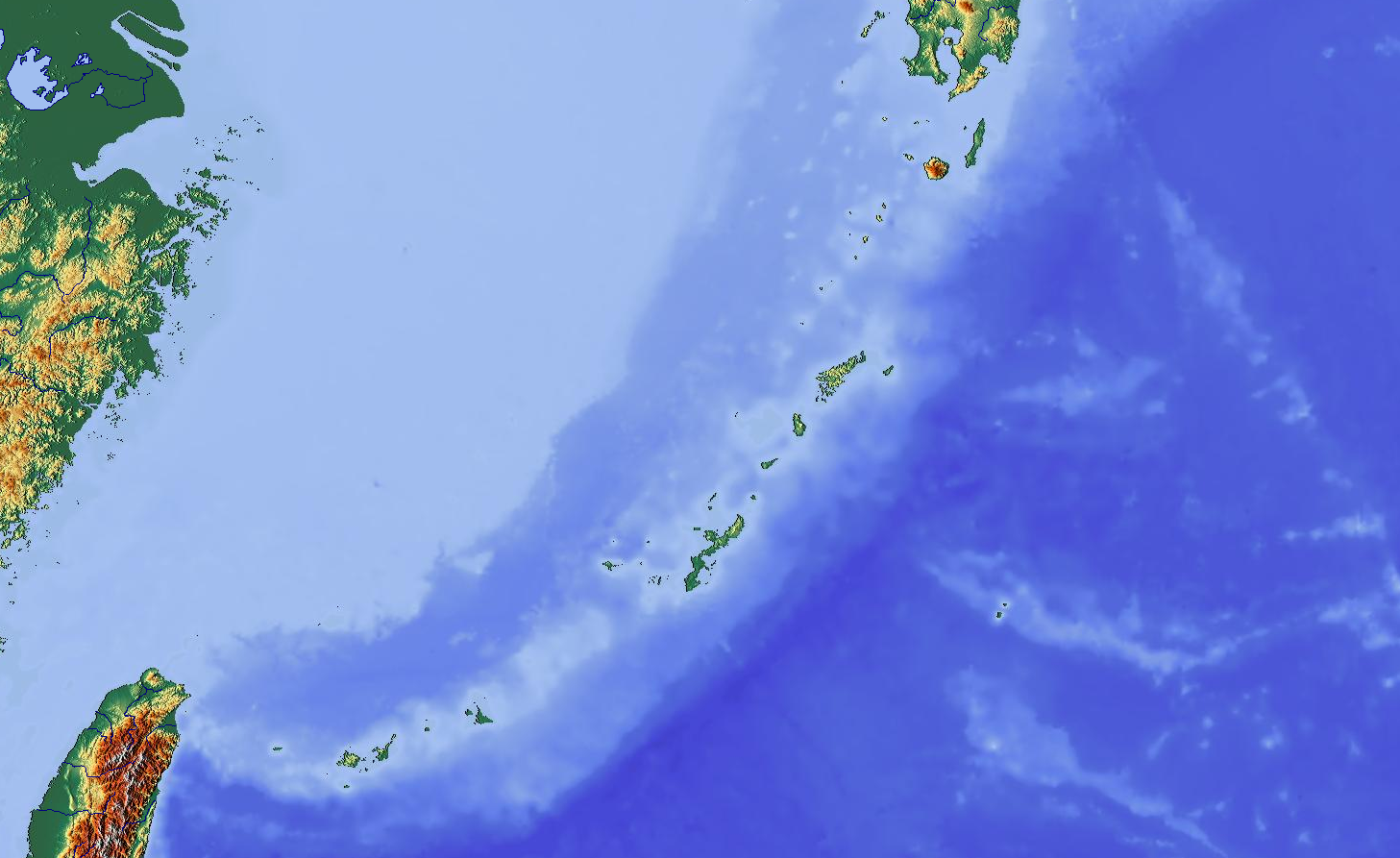
- Sanchi oil tanker collision (Ryukyu Islands) Approximate locations of the collision and sinking in the East China Sea
- Date: January 6, 2018; 8 years ago
- Time: 20:00 CST (UTC+08:00)
- Location: East China Sea, 160 nmi (300 km) east of Shanghai; 28.3667°N 125.9167°E
- Cause: Collision
- Participants: 53 crew (32 on Sanchi and 21 on CF Crystal)
- Deaths: 32 (all on Sanchi)

The Sanchi oil tanker collision occurred on 6 January 2018 when the Panamanian-flagged, Iranian-owned tanker Sanchi, with a full natural-gas condensate cargo of 136,000 tonnes (960,000 barrels), sailing from Iran to South Korea, collided with the Hong Kong-flagged cargo ship CF Crystal 160 nautical miles (300 km) off Shanghai, China. Sanchi caught fire shortly after the collision; after burning and drifting for over a week, it sank on 14 January.

All of Sanchi's 32 crew members were killed.

The crew of CF Crystal was rescued and the ship made port in China. The financial damage of the sinking of Sanchi, based on NIOC estimates, is around USD 110 million: USD 60 million for the cargo and US$50 million for the vessel itself.

== Collision ==
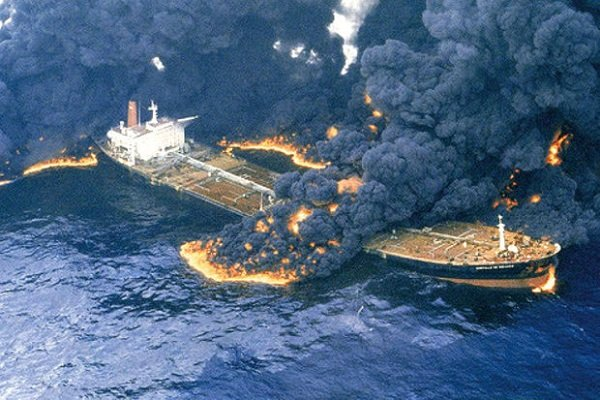
Sanchi burning and sinking

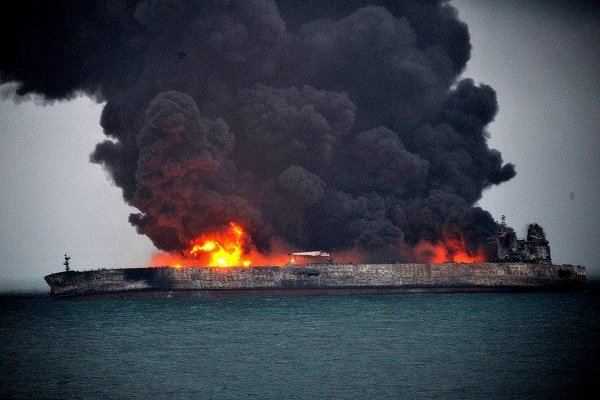
View from side

On the evening of 6 January 2018, at about 8 pm China time CST, the tanker Sanchi, which was carrying a full cargo of 136,000 metric tons (960,000 barrels) of South Pars natural-gas condensate for South Korean petrochemicals company Hanwha Total, on its north bound passage from Asaluyeh port, Iran, to Daesan, in South Korea, collided with the Hong Kong-flagged cargo ship CF Crystal in the East China Sea, 160 nautical miles (300 km) off Shanghai, China, and caught fire. Natural-gas condensate, often shortened to "condensate", is a highly flammable type of ultra-light crude oil.

Sanchi was a double-hulled Suezmax crude oil tanker, with an overall length of 274.18 metres (899 ft 6 in), a gross tonnage of 85,462, and deadweight tonnage of 164,154 tonnes (180,949 short tons). The tanker was built in 2008 by Hyundai Samho Heavy Industries at Yeongam, South Korea, for the National Iranian Tanker Company.

The other ship involved in the collision, CF Crystal, was a bulk carrier on a voyage from Kalama, Washington, U.S., to Machong, Guangdong Province, China, with 64,000 tonnes (71,000 short tons) of grain. The ship was built in 2011 by the Chengxi Shipyard Co Ltd, Jiangyin, China, for the current owner Changhong Group (HK) Ltd, Hong Kong, and is managed by Shanghai CP International Ship Management & Broker Co Ltd, Shanghai. The ship is a Panamax bulk carrier, with gross tonnage of 41,073, and a deadweight tonnage of 71,725 tonnes (79,063 short tons). Following the collision, the full Chinese crew of 21 was rescued. CF Crystal was brought into port at Zhoushan on 10 January.

=== Aftermath and sinking ===
The South Korea Maritime Police Agency and the United States Navy assisted Chinese authorities in firefighting and the search for the missing crew of Sanchi, which continued despite the risk of the tanker exploding. The body of one crew member was recovered on 8 January. Part of the tanker was reported to have exploded on 10 January. The South Korean Ministry of Oceans and Fisheries said that the fire could burn for up to four weeks.

On 12 January 2018, the Japan Coast Guard in Kagoshima reported that Sanchi had drifted into the Japanese Economic Zone on the afternoon of 10 January. Its position on the afternoon of 11 January was given by the same source as "300 kilometres (186 mi) northwest of Amami Ōshima island."

On 13 January, a Chinese rescue team recovered two bodies from a lifeboat aboard Sanchi and salvaged the voyage data recorder from the bridge. The four-person salvage team, although equipped with respirators, were forced off the vessel less than half an hour after boarding because the wind had shifted and toxic smoke had complicated the operation.

At 4:45 pm on 14 January, the tanker sank, leaving no survivors from the crew of 30 Iranian and two Bangladeshi seafarers. The chief of Iran's maritime agency told the Associated Press, "There is no hope of finding survivors."

On 17 January, China's Ministry of Transportation announced that the wreck of Sanchi has been located at a depth of 115 metres (377 ft).

== Environmental impact ==
According to a report by Reuters, because of the incident, a slick 13 by 11 kilometres (7.0 by 5.9 nmi) in size was formed on the sea surface, which is being pushed toward Japan by wind, and efforts to contain it were begun by ships surrounding the spill. Condensate is a highly volatile, highly toxic material that is greatly harmful to the environment. In addition to the slick on the water's surface, the sinking of the ship means that as the remaining condensate cargo and bunker oil – a heavier form of fuel oil – threaten the depths of the sea from the wreckage. An estimated 2,000 tonnes (2,200 short tons) of bunker oil is thought to have been in Sanchi's fuel storage tanks.

An article by The New York Times discussed the environmental impact further, saying that the portion of the East China Sea in which the spill took place is a location of edible fish spawning at that particular time of the year, as well as a migration path of whales. The incident was compared in magnitude with the Exxon Valdez oil spill.

Based on numerical simulations, National Oceanography Centre and University of Southampton researchers – who used Lagrangian particle tracking and hindcast circulation from a high-resolution global ocean general circulation model for the period 2006–2015 – produced a map of the potential contamination area and estimated that the pollution would reach Korean coasts within three months. Using updated simulations based on the sinking location of Sanchi, the same researchers subsequently estimated that contamination could reach Japan within one month, due to the close proximity of the strong Kuroshio Current. Further updates, based on the suspected, but unconfirmed, arrival of Sanchi oil at the island of Amami Ōshima, projected the contamination may reach the Ryukyu Island chain and potentially affect coral reefs there. However, ocean circulation models used by China's State Oceanic Administration in Qingdao showed a different path for the contamination, one that would instead bypass the coastal waters of Japan.

The New York Times asserts that the environmental damage, including possible contamination of beaches, as well as the damage to the fishing industry, may be significant, and will be paid for by the involved parties and their insurers.

A report by CNN stated that the slick grew in size to over 100 square kilometres (40 sq mi) by 19 January.

The volatile nature of the condensate makes the environmental impact of it different compared with crude oil spills. A report by Nature stated that because of this difference, perhaps the more important aspect of this spill is the immediate toxic effect of it on the marine inhabitants, with less concern about deposition of condensate on sediments or polluting beaches.

== Missing Crewmen ==
On January 14, 2019, within a few hours of the sinking of the MT Sanchi, the Iranian Government issued a statement declaring all crew members as “martyrs of resistance economy.” Subsequently, they issued death certificates for all crew members. However, a group of family members did not accept the government’s conclusion and requested an extensive search and rescue mission from the Iranian government. After one year of unsuccessful attempts, they filed an action in the U.S. District Court in Washington, D.C., claiming that the crew members of the Sanchi tanker (except for three of them) are alive and are in the custody of Iran. The case is currently pending. Attorney Ali Herischi is representing Plaintiffs in this case.

== See also ==
- Bridgeton incident
- International rankings of Iran in transport
