= MV Jernas =

Bahraini ship abandoned off the coast of Oman

Coordinates: 16°53′48″N 53°54′25″E

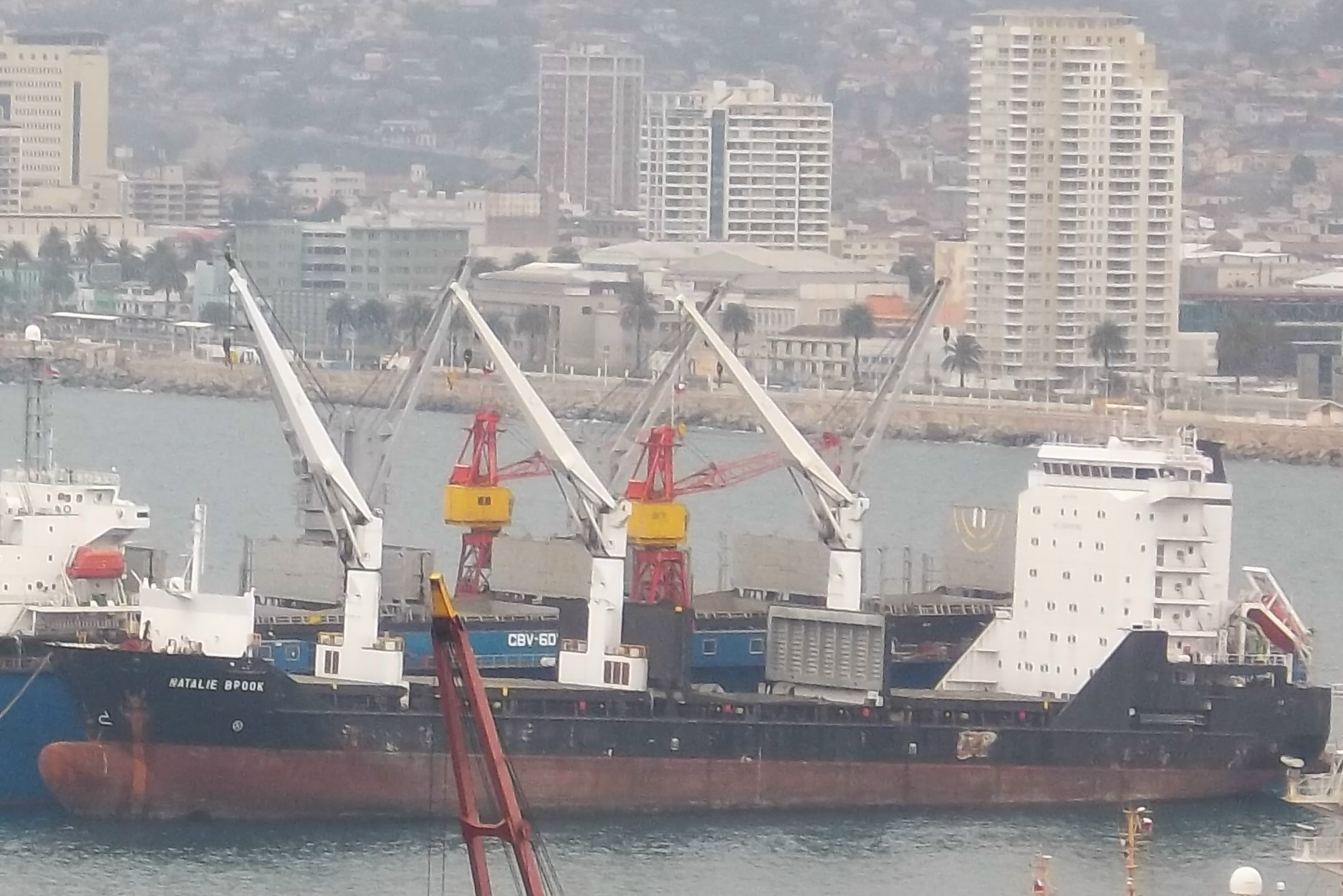
- The ship as Natalie Brook in 2011

History

Bahrain
- Name: MV Jernas
- Builder: Jiangsu Yangzijiang Shipbuilding
- Completed: 2001
- Identification: IMO number: 9232199
- Fate: Shipwrecked during Cyclone Mekunu in 2018
- Status: Abandoned

General characteristics
- Type: General cargo ship
- Tonnage: 10,132 GT
- Length: 127.31 m (417.7 ft)
- Beam: 21.2 m (70 ft)

Location of MV Jernas near Salalah, according to Google Earth satellite footage

MV Jernas is a Bahraini vessel that was shipwrecked off of the coast of Dhofar Governorate, Oman. It was blown off-course while anchored near the port of Salalah. The shipwreck is located southwest of Salalah in a small cove along a mountainous coastline, and has become a local tourist attraction.

== History ==
She was laid down in China in 2001 by shipbuilder Jiangsu Yangzijiang Shipbuilding. The ship was managed by a company called Adeema Ship Management and had historically been known as Natalie Brook before its ownership changed to its current Bahraini owners. The cargo ship normally would make regional journeys between Yemen, Oman, and the UAE.

In 2017, the ship was detained at port in Mukalla, Yemen due to a dispute between the captain/management and crew over unpaid wages, according to documentation by the International Labour Organization. Upon being released from Yemen, the ship headed for Salalah but broke down on its way there. When the ship was inspected for damage by port authorities, the manager was not able to pay the requisite fees to have repairs performed. The port authorities thus decided to allow the ship to anchor just outside of the port while the ship's owner proceeded with the payment; in the meantime, the crew stayed on the ship due to continued lapses in paid wages.

In May 2018, Cyclone Mekunu brought rainfall of 617 mm and winds of 175 km/h, resulting in the evacuation of the crew due to the critical situation. The ship was wrecked when it broke free from its anchor outside of the port and drifted to its current location during the storm.

== Tourist attraction ==
After its wreck the Omani government was initially concerned that the ship's contents could pollute the surrounding area if it contained oil; fortunately, it did not. This led to the ship being left in its location. The ship has attracted many tourists, particularly those with hobbies involving adventure and photography, due it being wrecked in such a wild area and also continuing to still float. The Gulf News describes the shipwreck thusly: "[a] mishap [that] evolved into an extraordinary open-air landmark, blending natural beauty, maritime history, and the raw force of nature".
