= Hanwha TotalEnergies Petrochemical =

South Korean petrochemical joint venture

Hanwha TotalEnergies Petrochemical Co., Ltd.
- Native name: 한화토탈에너지스 주식회사
- Formerly: Samsung General Chemicals (1988–2003); Samsung Atofina (2003); Samsung Total Petrochemicals (2004–2015); Hanwha Total Petrochemical (2015–2022)
- Type: Joint venture
- Industry: Petrochemicals, Petroleum refining
- Founded: May 1988; 38 years ago (as Samsung General Chemicals)
- Headquarters: Daesan, Seosan, South Chungcheong Province, South Korea
- Key people: Laurentius Na (CEO)
- Products: Polyethylene, polypropylene, ethylene, propylene, styrene, paraxylene, EVA, gasoline, diesel, jet fuel, LPG
- Owner: Hanwha (50%); TotalEnergies (50%)
- Number of employees: approximately 1,788 (2021) (2021)
- Parent: Hanwha Group
- Website: www.htpchem.com

Hanwha TotalEnergies Petrochemical Co., Ltd. (한화토탈에너지스) is a South Korean petrochemical company operating as a 50–50 joint venture between Hanwha Group and TotalEnergies. The company is headquartered in Daesan, Seosan, South Chungcheong Province, where it operates a large integrated refining and petrochemical complex.

== History ==
=== Samsung General Chemicals (1988–2003) ===
The company was founded in May 1988 as Samsung General Chemicals (삼성종합화학), a subsidiary of the Samsung Group. Construction of the Daesan petrochemical plant commenced in November 1989, and a comprehensive research institute was opened the same year. The Daesan complex was completed and began operations in September 1991. Over the following decade, the company expanded its facilities, completing plants for composite polypropylene (1993), styrene (1996), aromatics, purified terephthalic acid (PTA), and utilities (1997).

=== Joint venture with Total (2003-2015) ===
In May 2003, Samsung General Chemicals entered into a 50-50 joint venture agreement with Total (through its chemical subsidiary Atofina), creating Samsung Atofina. The company was renamed Samsung Total Petrochemicals in 2004.

Under the joint venture, the Daesan complex underwent extensive expansion. The BTX/PX aromatics plant was expanded in 2005, and the naphtha cracking centre (NCC), styrene, and polypropylene plants were further expanded in 2007. An olefins conversion unit (OCU) was completed in 2008. In 2009, a composite polypropylene plant was opened in Dongguan, China, and a sales subsidiary was established in Shanghai.

=== Transfer to Hanwha Group (2015–present) ===
In late 2014, Hanwha Group concluded a deal with Samsung Group to acquire a 57.6% stake in Samsung General Chemicals and joint managerial control over Samsung Total Petrochemicals, as part of a broader acquisition that also included Samsung Techwin. The transaction was completed in 2015, and the company was renamed Hanwha Total Petrochemical.

Following the acquisition, the company undertook a series of large-scale investments totalling approximately US$1.3 billion at the Daesan complex.

The company manufactures building block chemicals that go into the making of a host of other chemicals needed to make various consumer products. It starts with a naphtha cracker, yielding propylene and ethylene, which are the raw materials in the production of all manner of polymers. Hanwha TotalEnergies Petrochemical divides its operations in three: polymer production (polyethylene, polypropylene, high- and low-density polyethylene), base chemicals (selling the ethylene and propylene the company doesn't use itself, as well as aromatics used to make the materials that go into synthetic fibers), and oil products (jet, diesel, gasoline,...)

Hanwha TotalEnergies Petrochemical's headquarter is located at Daesan, the South Chungcheong Province in South Korea. It operates a large petrochemical complex, consisting of 13 separate plants in Daesan. And in addition, PP, PE compounding plant was at Dongkwan in China. Sales offices are operated in Seoul, Busan, Daegu, Gwangju and Daejeon. In Asia, Hanwha TotalEnergies Petrochemical's sales offices are located in Beijing, Shanghai, Shenzhen, Hong Kong, Tokyo, and Nagoya. Hanwha TotalEnergies Petrochemical employs 1788 people as of 2021 December.
