= MV Oliver Cromwell =

Converted Dutch barge to pleasure boat that sunk on tow in Irish Sea

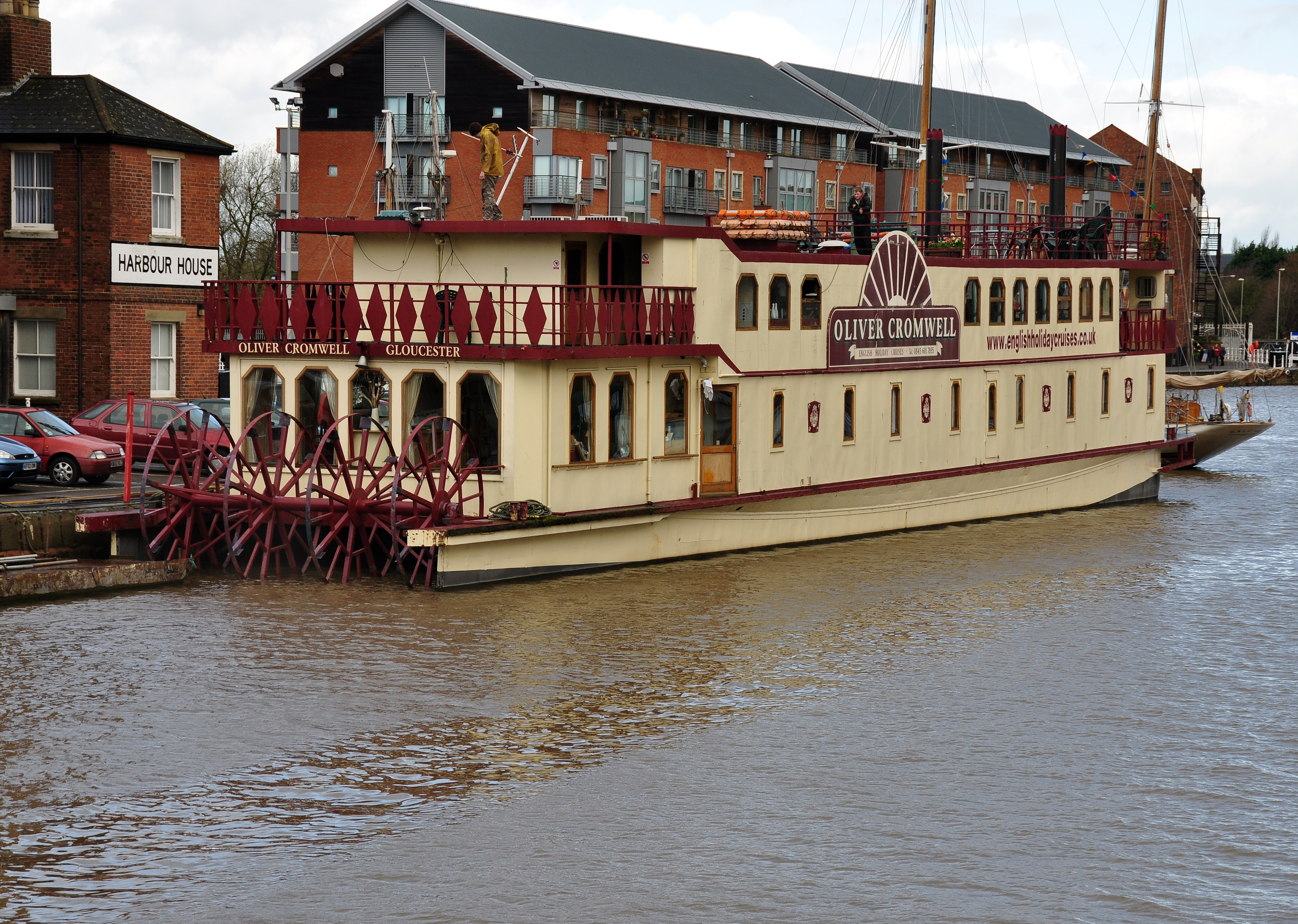
- MV Oliver Cromwell

History
- Name: 1922–1993 Unknown; 1993–2018 MV Oliver Cromwell
- Owner: 1922–1993 Unknown; 1993–2018 English Holiday Cruises; 2018–2018 Crannagh Marina Complex
- Route: 1922–1993 Unknown; 1993–1993 River Severn; 2009–2018 Static at Gloucester Docks
- Fate: Sunk under tow off South Stack, Anglesey 2018

General characteristics
- Length: 36 m (118 ft 1 in)

MV Oliver Cromwell was a Mississippi-style riverboat which was constructed as a Dutch barge in 1922 and converted into a riverboat hotel in 1993. As a stern paddle steamer and served as a hotel, restaurant and cabaret venue at Gloucester Docks, Gloucester. The vessel sank in the Irish Sea about 12 miles (10 nmi) west of South Stack, Anglesey on 25 March 2018 whilst being towed to a new location in Coleraine, Northern Ireland.

== History ==
The MV Oliver Cromwell was originally built as a Dutch barge in 1922 and was converted into a hotel barge by English Holiday Cruises in 1993 where it travelled between Gloucester and Worcester. It was moored permanently in Gloucester Docks from 2009 as its passenger licence was not renewed. At this point it was turned into a restaurant and cabaret venue. In 2012, it was put up for sale. Out of water surveys were carried out in 2014 which showed it was structurally sound. There were several parties interested in buying the vessel throughout 2016 and in 2017, a buyer emerged paying to repaint the outside of the vessel but they could not raise the funds to complete the sale. In January 2018, a blind bidding process resulted in the vessel being sold to Crannagh Marina Complex in Coleraine.

== Sinking ==
The vessel sank in the Irish Sea about 12 miles (10 nmi) west of South Stack, Anglesey on 25 May 2018 whilst being towed to a new location in Coleraine, Northern Ireland. The Holyhead coastguard attended but were unable to prevent the sinking, the coxswain commenting "It was very sad to see such a lovely vessel sink like that, but no-one was endangered and the lack of fuel on board meant there were no environmental issues". In June 2018, an investigation by the Maritime and Coastguard Agency over the sinking of the barge took place.
