= Dutch architecture in Semarang =

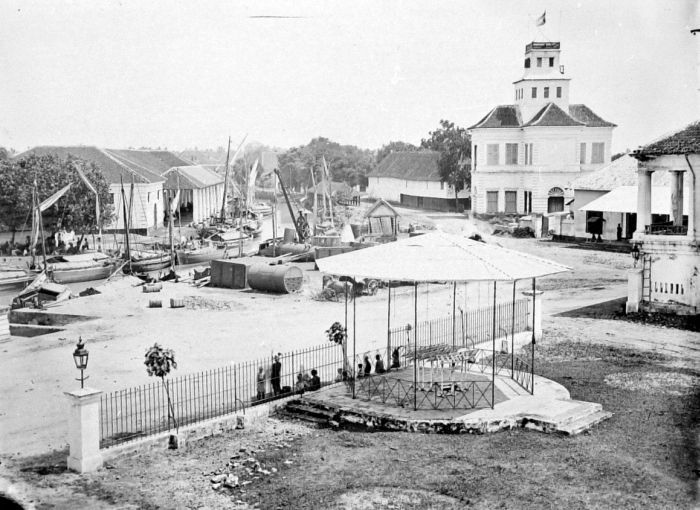
Watchtower (customs house?) and bandstand on the river in Semarang

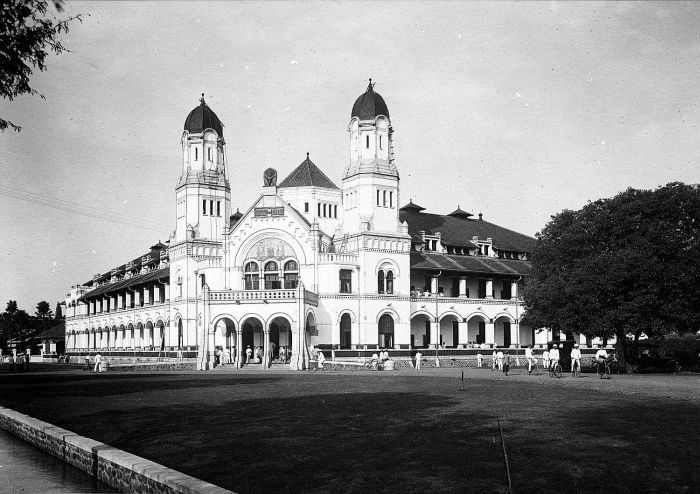
NIS Headquarters (now Lawang Sewu)

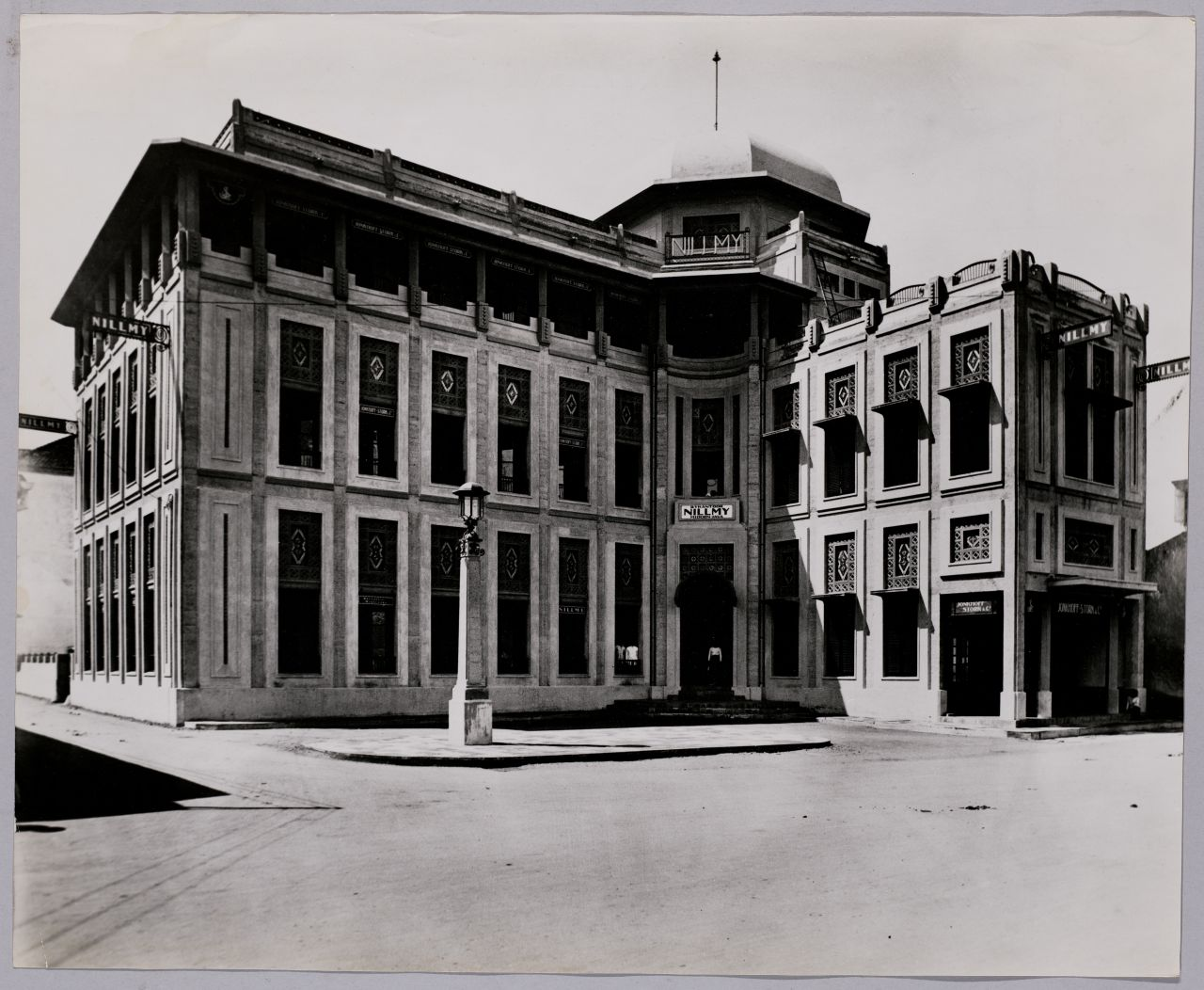
Nillmij Office Building

During the colonial period many significant examples of Dutch architecture were built in Semarang, Indonesia.

Control of Semarang was given to the Dutch East India Company (VOC) as a part of a debt payment by Sunan Amangkurat II in 1678 and established as area in 1682 Dutch. On 5 October 1705, Semarang officially became a VOC city when Susuhunan Pakubuwono I made a deal to give extensive trade rights to the VOC in exchange for wiping out Mataram's debt. The VOC, and later, the Dutch East Indies government, established tobacco plantations in the region and built roads and railroads, making Semarang an important colonial trading centre.

The presence of a Dutch based creole in the area is due to the fact that creole mix language called Javindo that developed.

The Japanese military occupied the city, along with the rest of Java, in 1942, during the Pacific War of World War II. After Indonesian independence in 1945, Semarang became the capital of Central Java province.

== City planning of Semarang during Dutch colonial era ==
=== The era of Classical Indische Town (1678–1870) ===
The city included a Muslim area called Kauman, a Chinese quarter, and a Dutch fortress. The fortress had a pentagonal form with only one gate in the south and five monitoring towers to protect the Dutch settlement from rebellion actions, segregating the spaces between Dutch settlement and other areas. The Dutch quarter was considered the city of Semarang by the Dutch while the other ethnic settlements were considered as villages outside the city boundary.

Known as de Europeesche Buurt, Semarang was built in classical European style with a church located in the centre, wide boulevards and streets skirted by beautiful villas. According to Purwanto (2005), the urban and architectural form of this settlement is very similar to the design principles applied in many Dutch cities and consideration of urban beautification.

Due to the long and costly Java War, there was not much of funding from the Dutch East Indies government for the development of Semarang. The majority of land was used for rice fields and the only small improvements were made around the fortress.

Although less populous than Jakarta and Surabaya, Semarang is a planned city with urban activities concentrated along the river. The settlement was linked to a market where different ethnic groups met to trade. The existence of the market, in the later years, become a primary element and a generator of urban economic growth.

An important influence on urban growth was the Great Mail Road project in 1847, which connected all the cities in northern coast of Central and East Java and made Semarang the trade centre of agricultural production. The project was soon followed by the development of the Netherlands Indies Railway and the connecting roads into the inner city of Semarang at the end of 19th century. Colombijn (2002) This marked the development as the shift of urban functions, from the former river orientation to facing the roads.

=== The growth of the modern city (1870–1922) ===
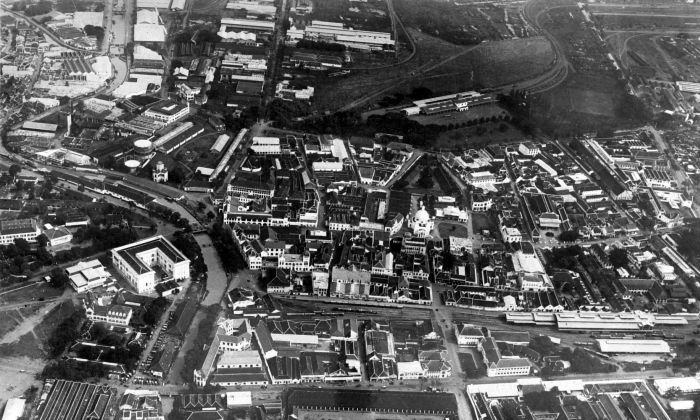
Aerial picture of Old Semarang (1920s)

The Dutch East Indies' mail and railway projects improved communication and transportation, bringing an economic boom to the city in the 1870s. Hospitals, churches, hotels, and mansions were built along the new main roads of Mataram Street, Bojongscheweg, and Pontjolscheweg. The Javanese quarters of town known as kampongs grew increasingly densely populated, reaching as many as 1000 inhabitants per hectare and degrading living conditions. Mortality remained high into the early 20th century, with newcomers, overcrowding, and poor hygiene triggering cholera and tuberculous outbreaks. Dysentery, typhoid, and malaria were also rife. The city doctor Willem T. de Vogel advocated strenuously for reducing overcrowding and improving living conditions by extending Semarang into the less malarial hill country to its south; his fellow councilman Hendrik Tillema had campaigned on a platform of combatting malaria and joined De Vogel's scheme, broadening it into a "village improvement" (Dutch: kampongverbetering) movement. Purchasing land in the heights with their own money, the two men and some friends passed it on to the city with an initial zoning plan by KPC de Bazel in 1907 but could never convince a majority of the council to support its development. Changing tack, Tillema then worked to improve the existing kampongs in the city's malarial districts by improving drainage and providing more sanitary public toilets and public housing.

A decade later, the town approved Thomas Karsten's revised plan for the area, using it to build larger villas for the Dutch and wealthy Chinese and Javanese rather than allowing its use by the poor. This area became known as Candi Baru (Dutch: Nieuw Tjandi) and forms the core of the present-day Candisari District. Although it remained highly stratified by class, Candi Baru had less ethnic segregation than the older area of town and incorporated public squares, athletic facilities, and places for public bathing and washing that could be used communally. With most work remaining in the lower city and transportation slow or expensive, few of the lower classes were interested in moving to the district but it set a pattern that was followed with three more successful housing plans between 1916–1919. The population grew by 55%, adding 45,000 Javanese, 8500 Chinese, and 7000 Europeans. Karsten's approach to town planning emphasized its aesthetic, practical, and social requirements articulated in economic terms rather than purely racial ones.

Driven by economic growth and spatial city planning, the city had doubled in size and expanded to the south by the 1920s, creating a nucleus of a metropolis where multi-ethnic groups lived and traded in the city. In 1908, Amsterdam architect Eduard Cuypers was commissioned to design numerous bank buildings for the Java Bank. The bank building for Semarang, designed by a unknown architect, was in 1908 almost complete but, according to Cuypers' plans, required significant improvements. In 1935, Eduard Cuypers' successors, Fermont-Cuypers, designed a new building for the Java Bank, as well as an office building for the Bataafsche Petroleum Maatschappij in 1938. Fermont-Cuypers also made the plans for three schools in Semarang, all still functioning. The villages in the suburbs such as Jomblang and Jatingaleh steadily became the satellite towns of Semarang, more populated with a bigger market area. Before the invasion of Japan in 1942, Semarang had already become the capital of Central Java Province, as the result of trade and industrial success and spatial planning. What about the architecture during the colonial period, Indonesian researchers will benefit from the book "Indische Bouwkunst" . This lists more than 2000 projects built between 1900 and 1958 – many of which in Semarang- , as well as over 150 architects who designed them. This book has been translated into Bahasa Indonesia and is available as a free download.

== Buildings ==
Significant buildings include:

- NIS Headquarters (now Lawang Sewu)
- Nillmij Office Building
- Villa Bodjong Gimberg
- Semarang Residency House
- Semarang Tawang Station
- "Generaalswoning"

== Gallery ==
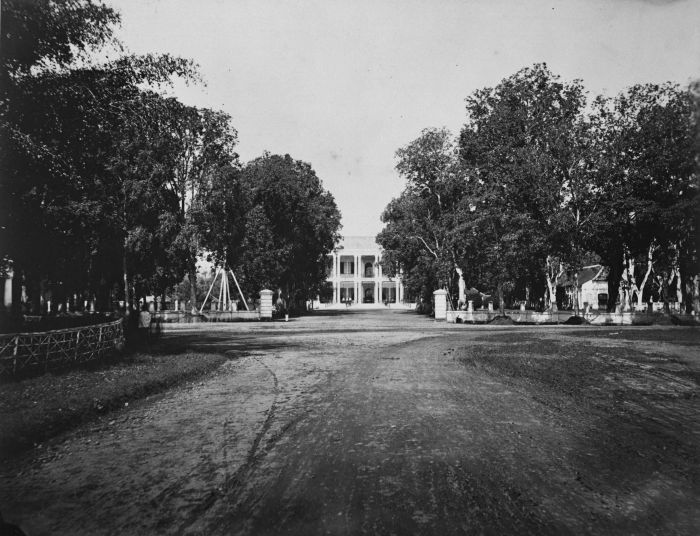
Residency House in Semarang (19th century)

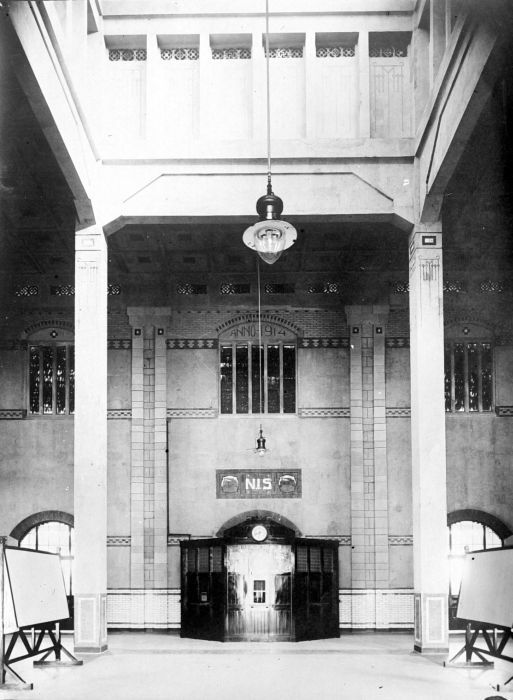
Semarang Tawang train station of the NIS

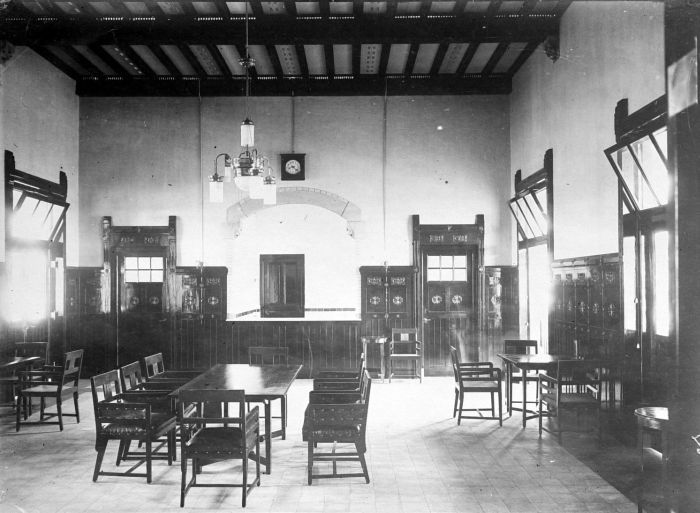
Waiting room of the Semarang Tawang train station

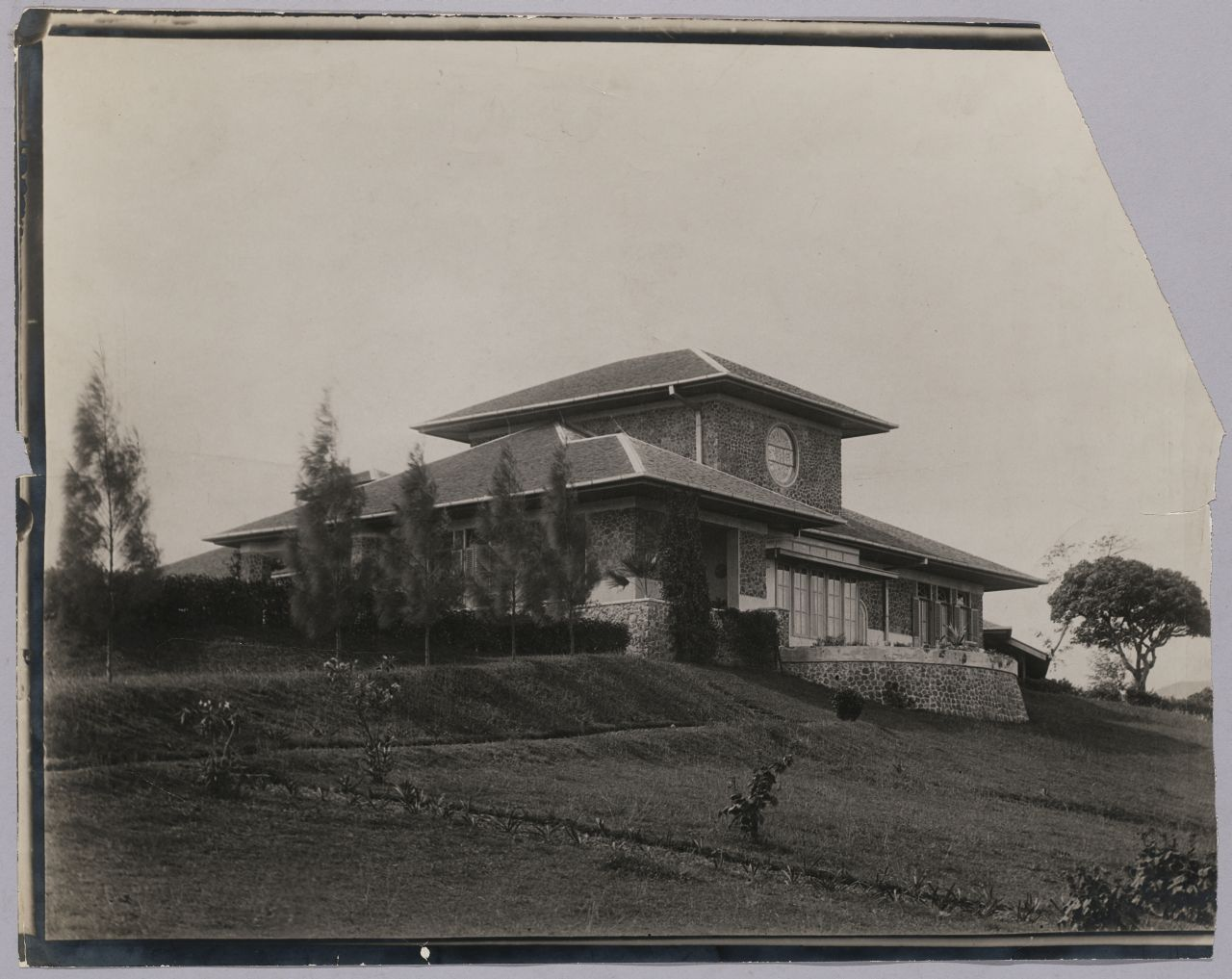
"Woonhuis" designed by Edwin Landseer Lutyens

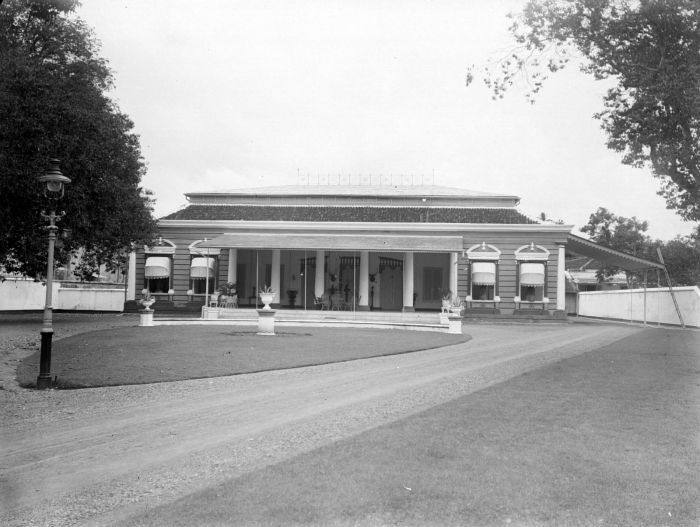
Villa Bodjong Gimberg

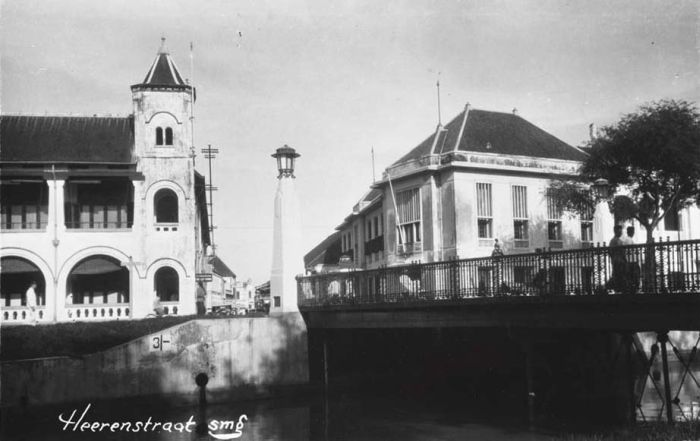
Heerenstraat (Lords Street)

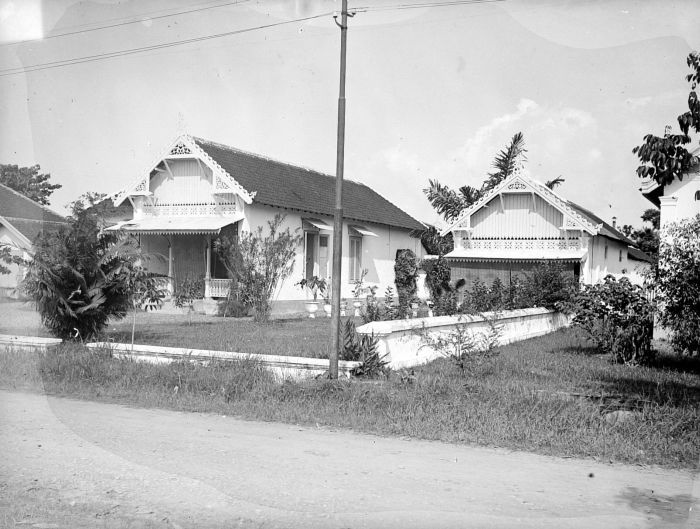
Houses

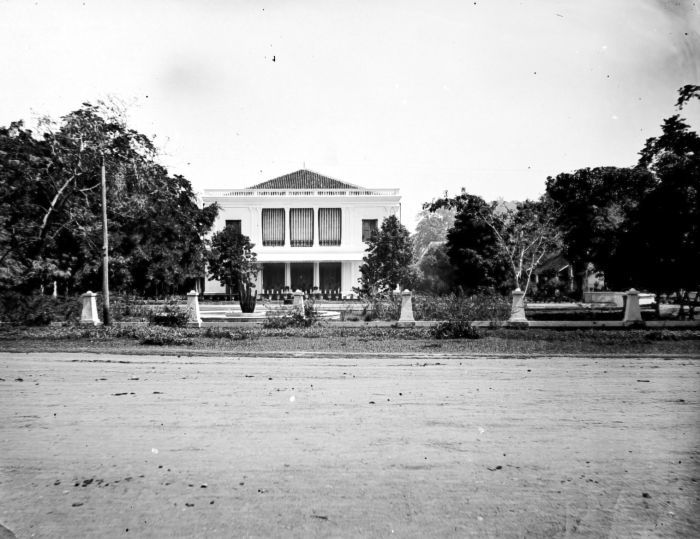
"Generaalswoning"
