= Semarang =

Capital and largest city of Central Java, Indonesia

- City
- City of Semarang; Kota Semarang

Other transcription(s)
  - Javanese: ꦏꦸꦛꦯꦼꦩꦫꦁ
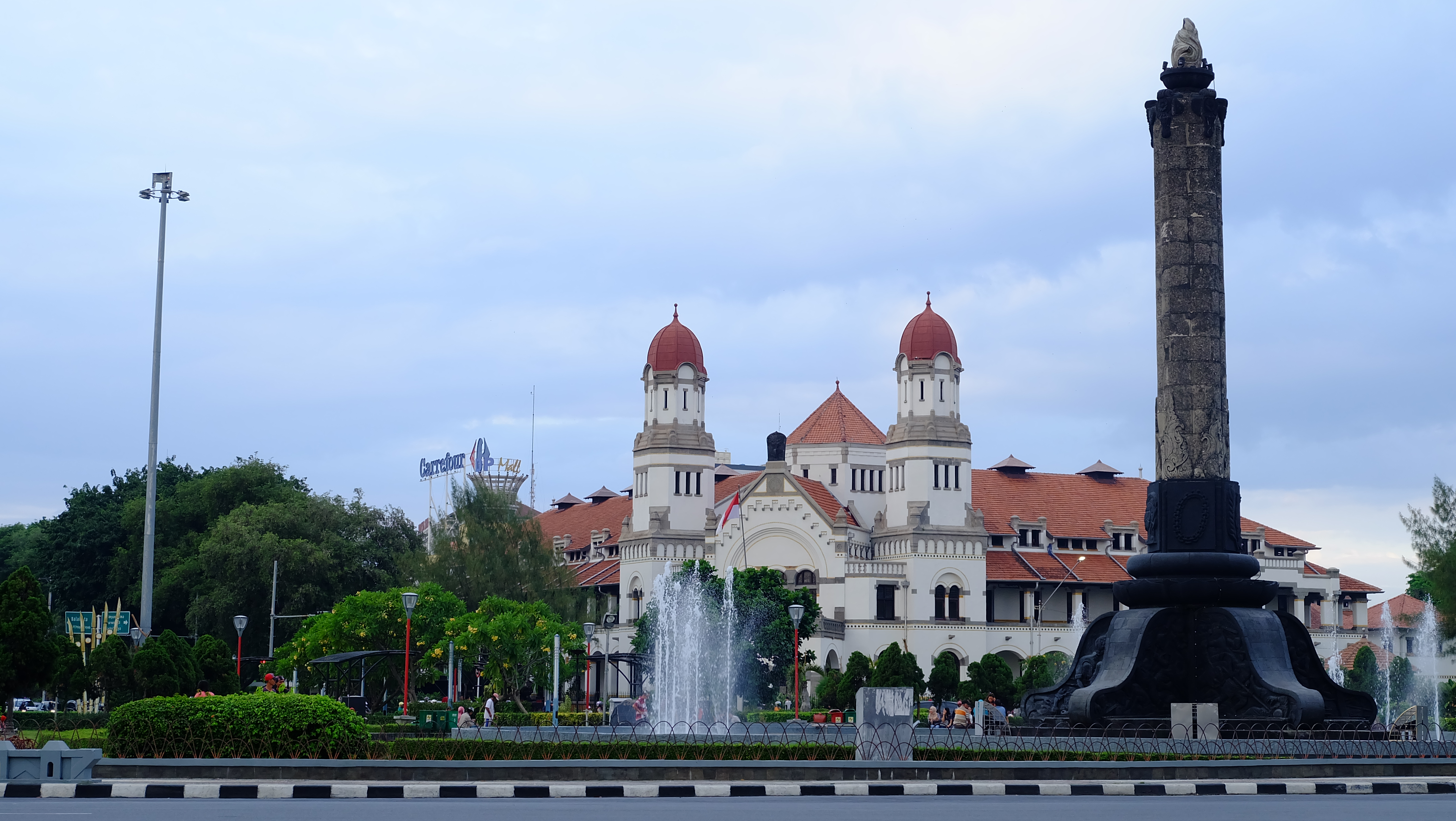
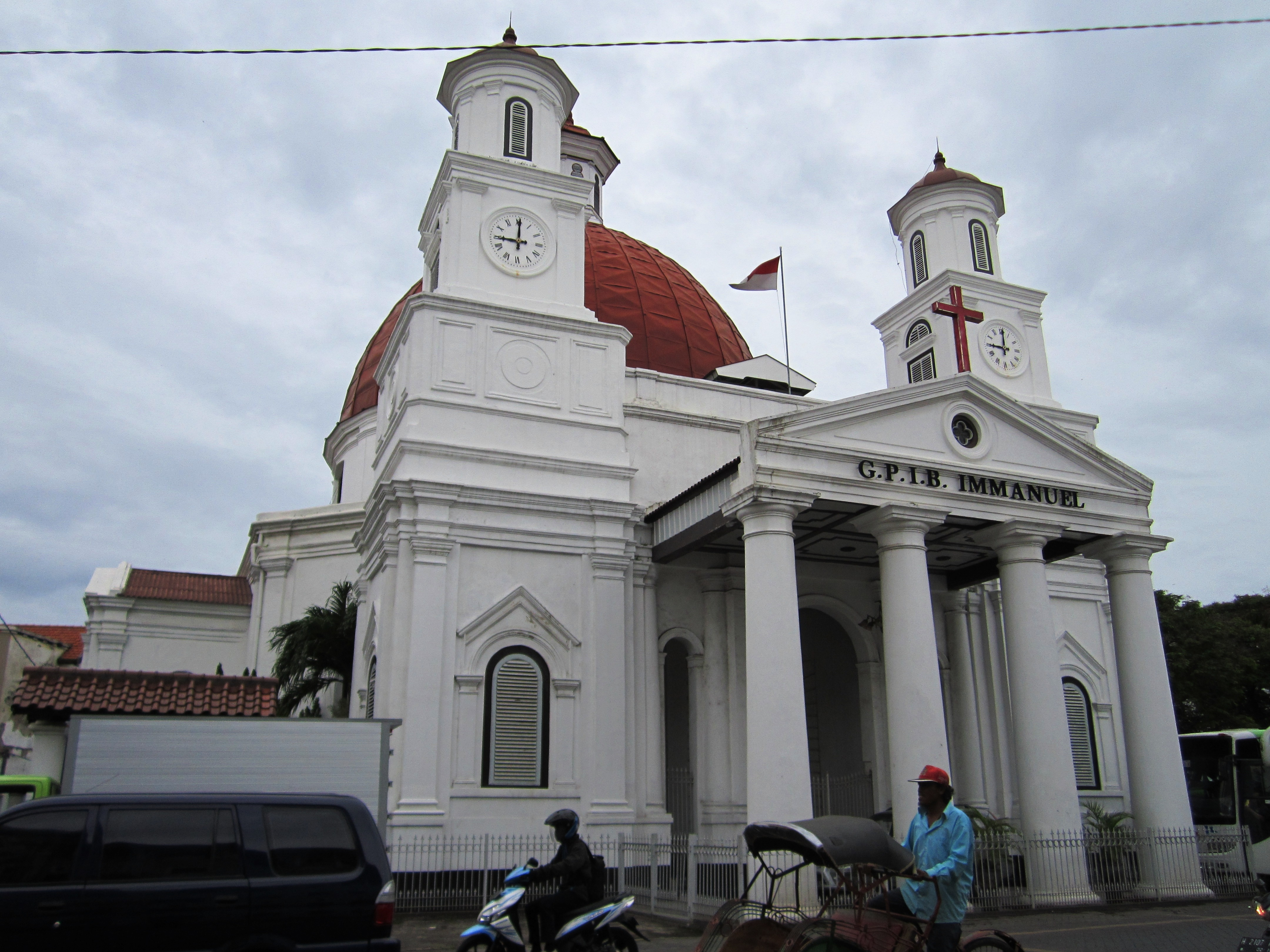
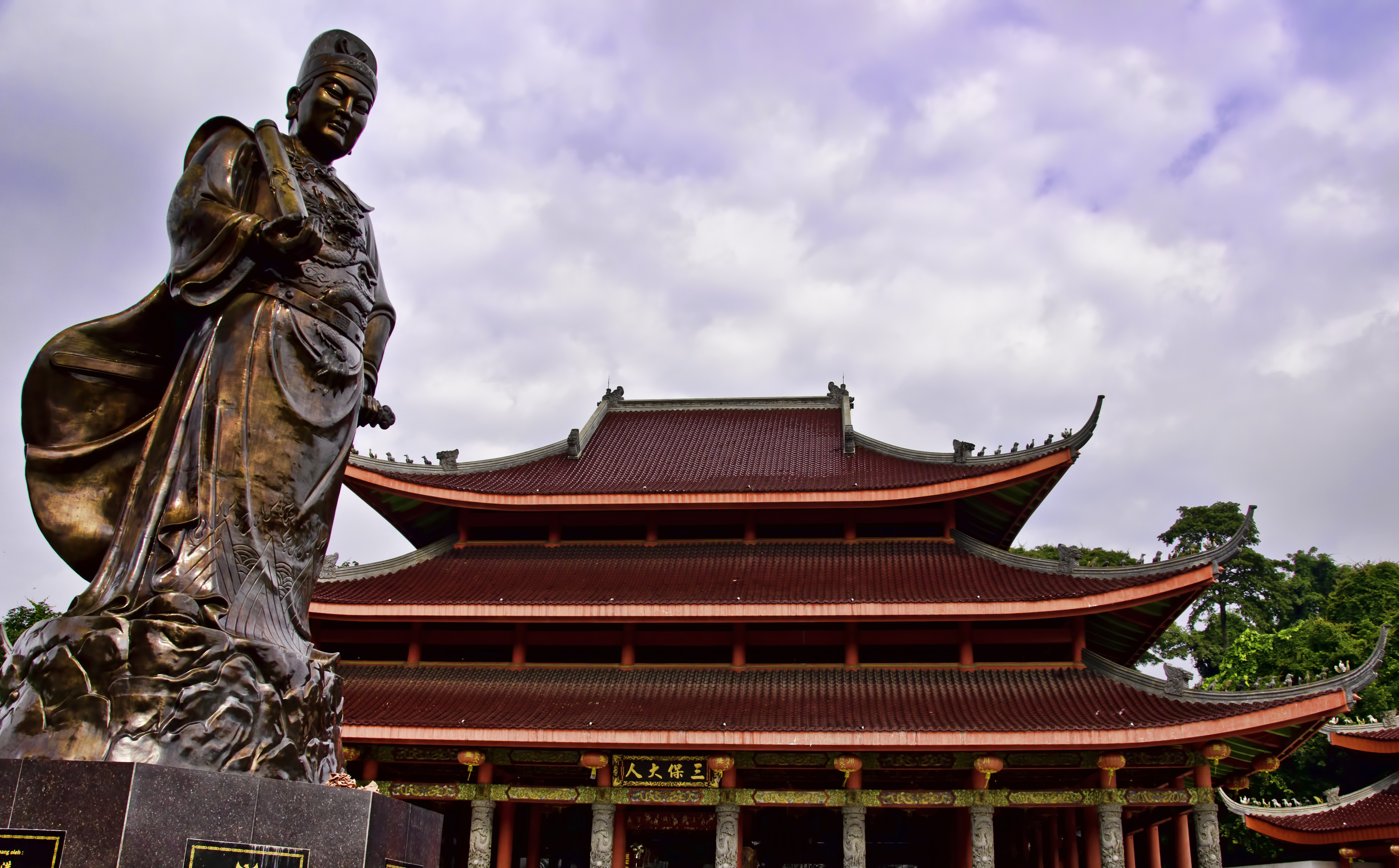
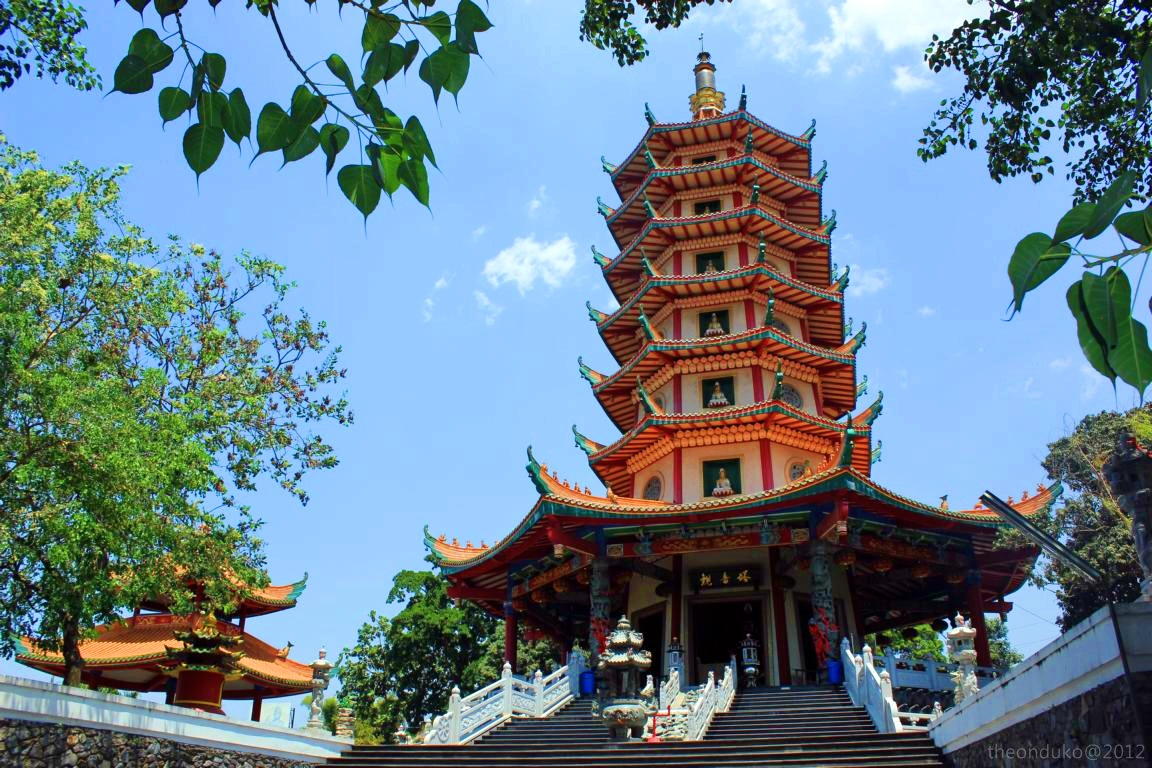
- Lawang Sewu and Tugu Muda (right) Blenduk Church Sam Poo Kong Vihara Buddhagaya Watugong Great Mosque of Central Java

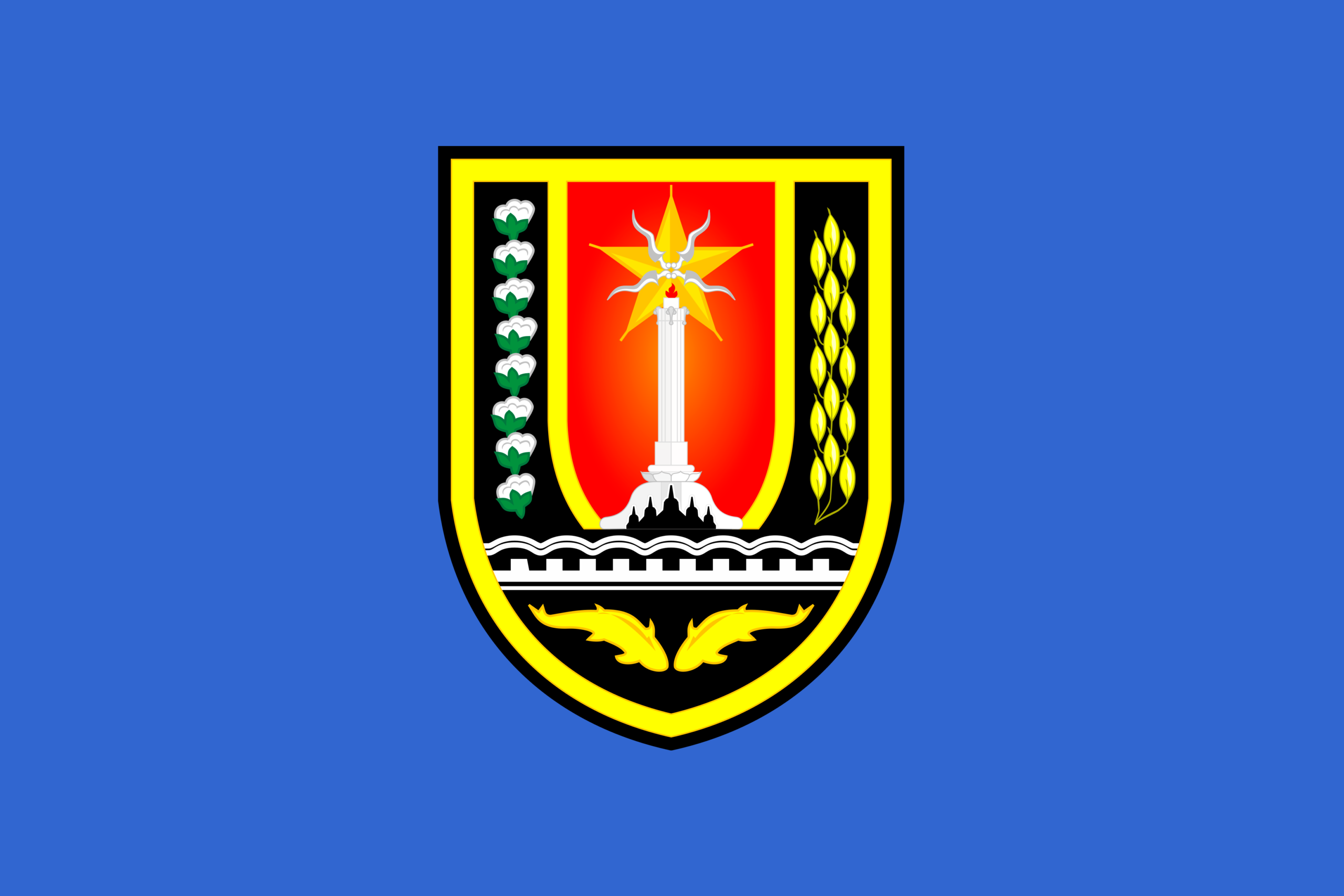
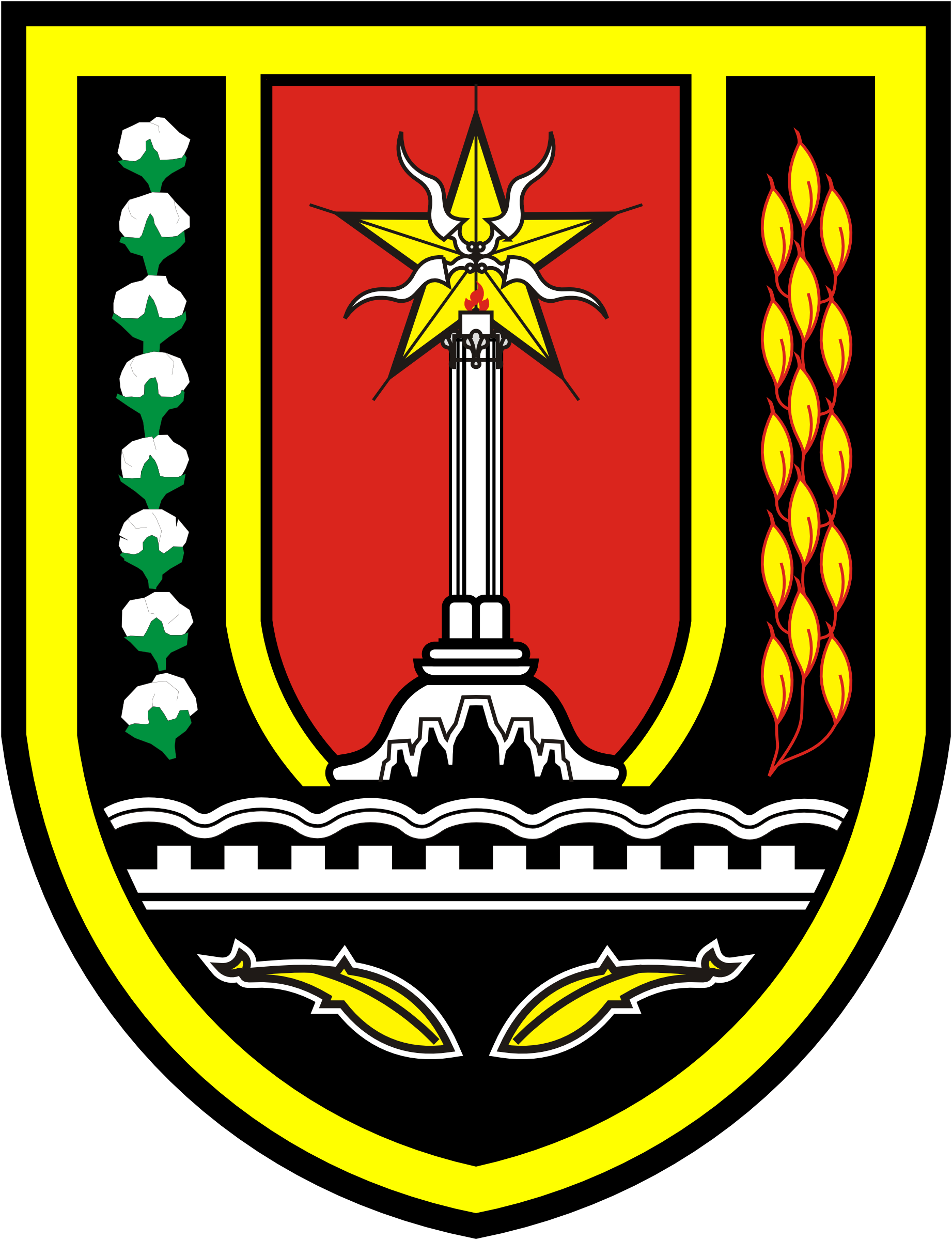
- Flag Coat of arms
- Nicknames: Venetië van Java (Dutch) "Venice of Java"
- Motto: Kota ATLAS acronym of Aman, Tertib, Lancar, Asri, Sehat "Secure, Orderly, Swift, Beautiful, Healthy"
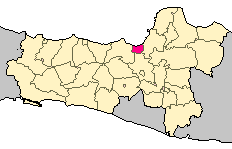
- Location within Central Java

- Location in Java and Indonesia Semarang (Indonesia)
- Coordinates: 06°59′24″S 110°25′21″E
- Country: Indonesia
- Province: Central Java
- Metropolitan area: Kedungsepur

Government
  - Type: Mayor-council
  - Body: Semarang City Government
  - Mayor: Agustina Wilujeng Pramestuti (PDI-P)
  - Vice Mayor: Iswar Aminuddin
  - Legislature: Semarang City Regional House of Representatives (DPRD)

Area
  - City: 373.78 km^{2} (144.32 sq mi)
  - Metro: 5,453.99 km^{2} (2,105.80 sq mi)

Population (mid 2025 estimate)
  - City: 1,722,421
  - Rank: 9th
  - Density: 4,608.1/km^{2} (11,935/sq mi)
  - Metro: 6,760,538
  - Metro density: 1,239.56/km^{2} (3,210.44/sq mi)
- Demonym: Semarangan

Nominal GDP (nominal, 2023)
  - Total: Rp 248.902 trillion US$ 16.330 billion
  - Per capita: Rp 146.868 million US$ 9,635
- Time zone: UTC+7 (IWST)
- Postcodes: 501xx – 502xx
- Area code: (+62) 24
- Vehicle registration: H
- HDI (2025): ▲0.858 (6th) very high
- Website: semarangkota.go.id

Semarang (Javanese: ꦏꦸꦛꦯꦼꦩꦫꦁ, Kutha Semarang) is the capital and largest city of Central Java province in Indonesia. It was a major port during the Dutch colonial era, and is still an important regional center and port today. The city has been named as the cleanest tourist destination in Southeast Asia by the ASEAN Clean Tourist City Standard (ACTCS) for 2020–2022.

It has an area of 373.78 km^{2} (144.32 sq mi) and had a population of 1,555,984 at the 2010 census and 1,653,524 at the 2020 census, making it Indonesia's ninth most populous city after Jakarta, Surabaya, Bekasi, Bandung, Medan, Depok, Tangerang and Palembang; the official population estimate as at mid 2025 was 1,722,421 (comprising 851,637 males and 870,784 females). The built-up urban area had 3,183,516 inhabitants at the 2010 census spread over two cities and 26 districts. The Semarang metropolitan area (a.k.a. Kedungsepur) has a population of over 6 million in 2020 (see Greater Semarang section). The population of the city is predominantly Javanese with significant Chinese presence.

== History ==
Historical affiliations

Demak Sultanate (1547–1554)
Kingdom of Pajang (1568–1587)
Mataram Sultanate (1587–1705)
Dutch East India Company (1705–1799)
Dutch East Indies (1800–1942)
Empire of Japan (1942–1945)
Dutch East Indies (1945–1949)
United States of Indonesia (1949–1950)
Indonesia (1950–present)

The history of Semarang goes back to the 9th century, when it was known as Bergota. At the end of the 15th century, the Demak Sultanate appointed an Islamic scholar named Ki Ageng Pandan Arang to build an Islamic school in this fishing village. On 2 May 1547, Sultan Hadiwijaya of Pajang declared Pandan Arang as the first bupati (mayor) of Semarang, thus creating Semarang administratively and politically.

In 1678, Sunan Amangkurat II promised to give control of Semarang to the Dutch East India Company (VOC) as a part of a debt payment. In 1682, the Semarang state was founded by the Dutch colonial power. On 5 October 1705 after years of occupations, Semarang officially became a VOC city when Susuhunan Pakubuwono I made a deal to give extensive trade rights to the VOC in exchange of wiping out Mataram's debt. The VOC, and later, the Dutch East Indies government, established tobacco plantations in the region and built roads and railroads, making Semarang an important colonial trading centre.

The historic presence of a large Indo (Eurasian) community in the area of Semarang is also reflected by the fact a creole mix language called Javindo existed there.

=== Classical Indische Town (1678–1870) ===
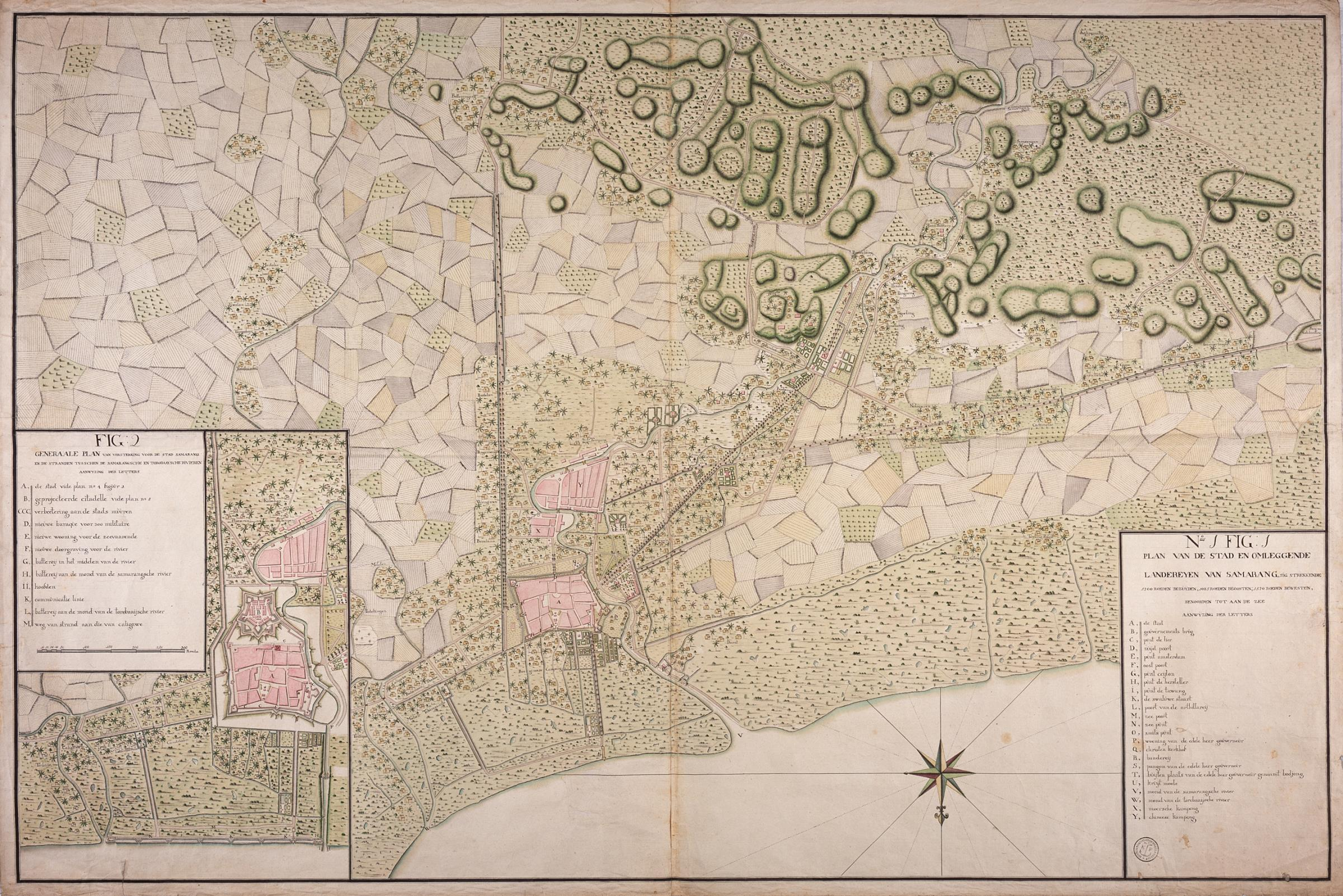
The early VOC settlement of Semarang with its prominent pentagonal fortress.

Semarang was handed by the Sultan of Mataram to the Dutch East Indies in 1678. The city was pictured as a small settlement with a pious Muslim area called Kauman, a Chinese quarter, and a Dutch fortress. The fortress has a pentagonal form with only one gate in the south and five monitoring towers to protect the Dutch settlement from rebellion actions, segregating the spaces between Dutch settlement and other areas. In fact, only the Dutch quarter was referred to as the city of Semarang while the other ethnic settlements were considered as villages outside the city boundary. The city, known as de Europeesche Buurt, was built in classical European style with a church located in the centre, wide boulevards, streets and villas. According to Purwanto (2005), the urban and architectural form of this settlement is very similar to the design principles applied in many Dutch cities.

Due to the long and costly Java War, there was not much funding from the Dutch East Indies government, and this affected Semarang's development. Most land in the area was used for rice cultivation and the only small improvement was the development of a surrounding fortress. Although less developed, Semarang was a fairly well organized city, in which urban activities were concentrated along the river and the settlement was linked to a market where different ethnic groups met to trade. The existence of the market, in the later years, become a primary element and a generator of urban economic growth.

After the fall of Fort Cornelis in late August 1811, Governor-General Jan Willem Janssens withdrew eastward toward Central Java, making Semarang region a key corridor for his retreat and attempted regrouping. British forces under Colonel R. R. Gillespie advanced through Semarang and its hinterland toward Salatiga, engaging Dutch troops along the route. The campaign ended with Janssens’s surrender to Lieutenant-General Sir Samuel Auchmuty at Tuntang on 18 September 1811, which marked the transfer of Java from Dutch to British rule.

After the departure of Herman Willem Daendels, Napoleonic governor of Java, the Dutch reorganized Java into Residencies, and Semarang became the seat of the new Semarang Residency in 1817. An important influence on urban growth was the Great Mail Road project in the 1847, which connected all the cities in the northern coast of Central and East Java and positioned Semarang as the trade centre of agricultural production. The project was soon followed by the development of the Staatsspoorwegen Railway and the connecting roads into the inner city of Semarang at the end of the 19th century. Colombijn (2002) marked the development as the shift of urban functions, from the former river orientation to all services facing the roads.

=== Modern city (1870–1922) ===
Coat of Arms of Semarang during Dutch colonial era, granted in 1827.

The Dutch East Indies' mail and railway projects improved communication and transportation, bringing an economic boom to the city in the 1870s. Hospitals, churches, hotels, and mansions were built along the new main roads of Mataram Street, Bojongscheweg, and Pontjolscheweg. The Javanese quarters of town known as kampongs grew increasingly densely populated, reaching as many as 1000 inhabitants per hectare and degrading living conditions. Mortality remained high into the early 20th century, with newcomers, overcrowding, and poor hygiene triggering cholera and tuberculous outbreaks. Dysentery, typhoid, and malaria were also rife. The city doctor Willem T. de Vogel advocated strenuously for reducing overcrowding and improving living conditions by extending Semarang into the less malarial hill country to its south; his fellow councilman Hendrik Tillema had campaigned on a platform of combatting malaria and joined De Vogel's scheme, broadening it into a "village improvement" (Dutch: kampongverbetering) movement. Purchasing land in the heights with their own money, the two men and some friends passed it on to the city with an initial zoning plan by KPC de Bazel in 1907 but could never convince a majority of the council to support its development. Changing tack, Tillema then worked to improve the existing kampongs in the city's malarial districts by improving drainage and providing more sanitary public toilets and public housing.

A decade later, the town approved Thomas Karsten's revised plan for the area, using it to build larger villas for the Dutch and wealthy Chinese and Javanese rather than allowing its use by the poor. This area became known as Candi Baru (Dutch: Nieuw Tjandi) and forms the core of the present-day Candisari District. Although it remained highly stratified by class, Candi Baru had less ethnic segregation than the older area of town and incorporated public squares, athletic facilities, and places for public bathing and washing that could be used communally. With most work remaining in the lower city and transportation slow or expensive, few of the lower classes were interested in moving to the district but it set a pattern that was followed with three more successful housing plans between 1916 and 1919. The population grew by 55%, adding 45,000 Javanese, 8500 Chinese, and 7000 Europeans. Karsten's approach to town planning emphasized its aesthetic, practical, and social requirements articulated in economic terms rather than purely racial ones.

Driven by economic growth and spatial city planning, the city had doubled in size and expanded to the south by the 1920s, creating a nucleus of a metropolis where multi-ethnic groups lived and traded in the city. The villages in the suburbs such as Jomblang and Jatingaleh steadily became the satellite towns of Semarang, more populated with a bigger market area. Before the invasion of Japan in 1942, Semarang had already become the capital of Central Java province, as the result of trade and industrial success and spatial planning.

In 1918 the Indonesian People's Hall (Gedung Rakyat Indonesia) was established in Semarang by Sarekat Rakyat. The building functioned as a center for political and social activities, hosting meetings, congresses, and educational courses for activists. In 1927, fearing the impact activities there, the Dutch colonial government ordered its closure.

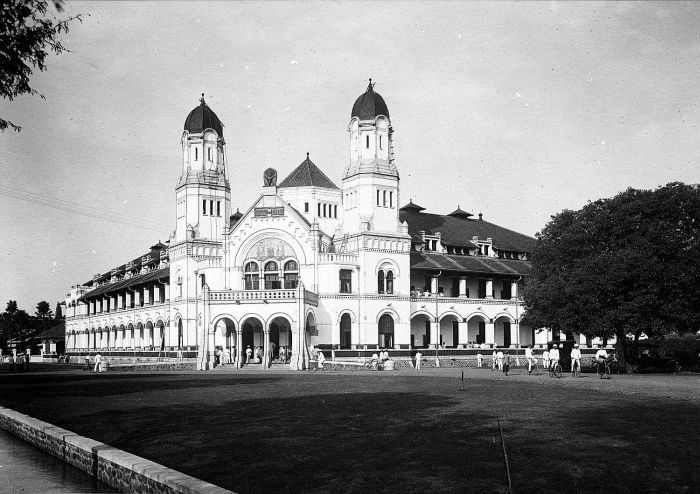
NIS company head office (Gedung Lawang Sewu), Semarang, Dutch East Indies.

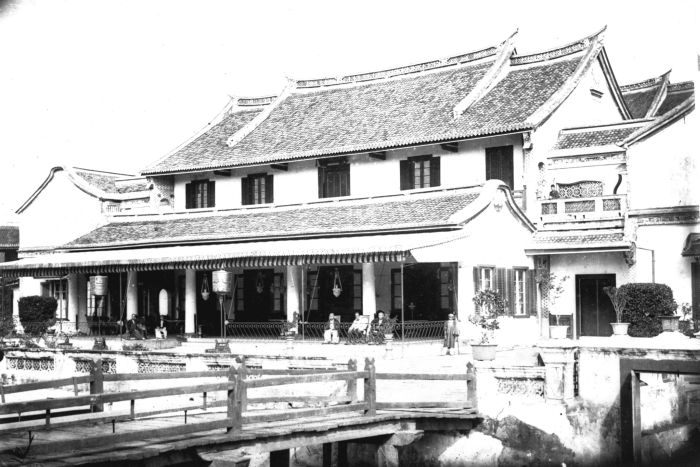
A Chinese house in Semarang at the turn of the 20th century.

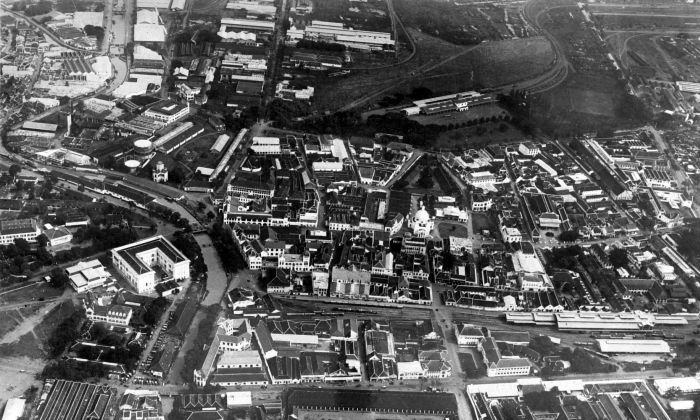
Aerial picture of Old Semarang area in the 1920s.

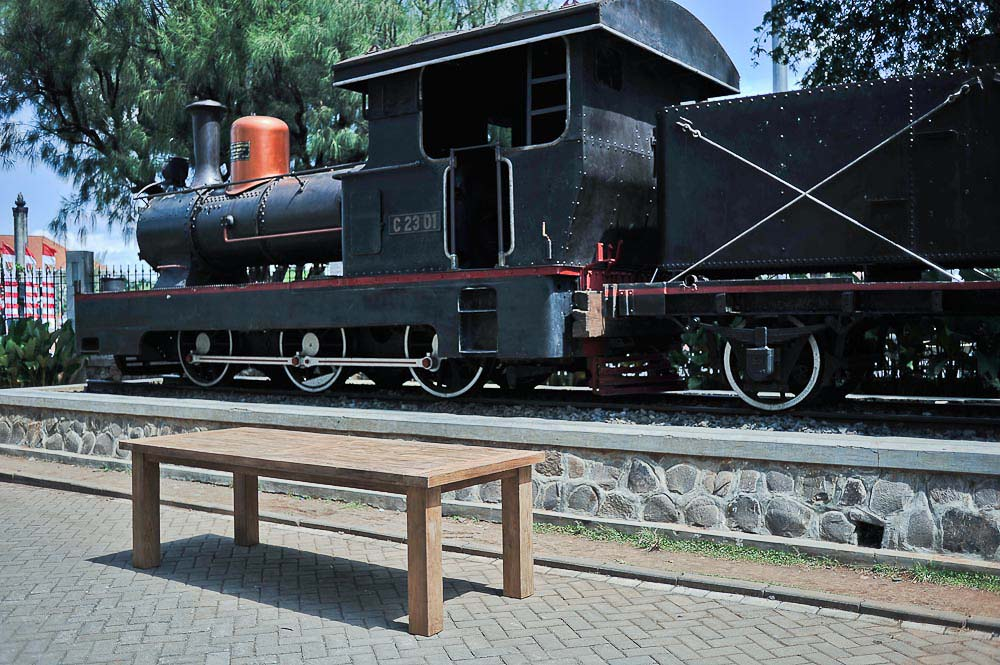
Old 0-6-0 locomotive next to the Lawang Sewu building.

=== Japanese occupation and early independence ===
The Japanese military occupied the city, along with the rest of Java, in 1942, during the Pacific War of World War II. During that time, Semarang was headed by a military governor called a Shiko, and two vice governors known as Fuku Shiko. One of the vice governors was appointed from Japan, and the other was "chosen" from the local population.

After Indonesian independence in 1945, Semarang became the capital of Central Java on 18 August 1945, headed by Mr. Moch.Ichsan.

On the afternoon of 17 August 1945, news of the Proclamation of Indonesian Independence reached Semarang. At 12:30 p.m. the following day, activists, youth, politicians, indigenous government officials, and other community leaders—including Mr. KRT Wongsonegoro, Subandrio, and Ibnu Parna—gathered in Purusara (Pusat Rumah Sakit Rakyat, People's Central Hospital) (present day Kariadi Hospital) to discuss their response to the proclamation. The meeting resolved to establish a local government under the authority of the Republic of Indonesia, with Wongsonegoro as its head. The outcome of this assembly was published in the Sinar Baru newspaper on 19 August 1945.

=== Military history ===
It also became the site of a battle (Five days battle, Pertempuran lima hari) between the new Indonesian military and Japanese soldiers in October 1945. Shortly after that, what had been the Indonesia-conducted Ambarawa, Magelang, and Ungaran offensives reached Semarang city on 15 December 1945, causing an 87-day battle that swept away the British and Dutch military completely.

== Administration ==
On 1 March 1906, based on Staatsblad of 1906 no. 120, Semarang was officially designated as a city (stadsgemeente or kota madya), covering an area of 9,940 ha.

Semarang city administration is headed by mayor, with a legislative assembly. Both mayor and the 50 members of legislative assembly are elected by direct vote. The government of Semarang City had implemented the smart city concept since 2013.

Juridically, Semarang City is a municipality (second level area) consisting of 16 districts (kecamatan), which are again divided into 177 urban villages (kelurahan). The districts are tabulated below with their areas and their populations at the 2010 census and 2020 census, together with the official estimates as at mid 2025. The table also includes the number and names of the urban administrative villages in each district.

Kode Wilayah	District (kecamatan)	Area in km^{2}	Pop'n census 2010	Pop'n census 2020	Pop'n estimate mid 2025	No. of villages	Administrative villages (kelurahan)
33.74.14	Mijen (Javanese: ꦩꦶꦗꦺꦤ꧀, romanized: Mijèn)	56.52	55,708	80,906	96,357	14	Cangkiran, Bubakan, Jatibarang, Jatisari, Karangmalang, Kedungpane, Mijen, Ngadirgo, Pesantren, Polaman, Purwosari, Tambangan, Wonolopo, Wonoplumbon,
33.74.12	Gunungpati (Javanese: ꦒꦸꦤꦸꦁꦥꦛꦶ, romanized: Gunungpathi)	58.27	88,444	98,023	102,429	16	Cepoko, Gunungpati, Jatirejo, Kalisegoro, Kandri, Mangunsari, Ngijo, Nongkosawit, Pakintelan, Patemon, Plalangan, Pongangan, Sadeng, Sekaran, Sukorejo, Sumurejo
33.74.11	Banyumanik (Javanese: ꦧꦚꦸꦩꦤꦶꦏ꧀, romanized: Banyumanik)	29.74	136,368	142,076	144,087	11	Pudakpayung, Gedawang, Jabungan, Padangsari, Banyumanik, Srondol Wetan, Pedalangan, Sumurboto, Srondol Kulon, Tinjomoyo, Ngesrep
33.74.09	Gajah Mungkur (Javanese: ꦒꦗꦃꦩꦸꦁꦏꦸꦂ, romanized: Gajah Mungkur)	9.34	59,911	56,232	56,328	8	Bendanduwur, Bendanngisor, Bendungan, Gajahmungkur, Karangrejo, Lempongsari, Petompon, Sampangan
33.74.07	Semarang Selatan (South Semarang) (Javanese: ꦱꦼꦩꦫꦁꦏꦶꦢꦸꦭ꧀, romanized: Sěmarang Kidul	5.95	69,617	62,030	61,981	10	Barusari, Bulustalan, Lamper Kidul, Lamper Lor, Lamper Tengah, Mugassari, Peterongan, Pleburan, Randusari, Wonodri
33.74.08	Candisari (Javanese: ꦕꦤ꧀ꦝꦶꦱꦫꦶ, romanized: Candhisari)	6.40	75,879	75,456	75,396	7	Candi, Jatingaleh, Jomblang, Kaliwiru, Karanganyargunung, Tegalsari, Wonotingal
33.74.10	Tembalang (Javanese: ꦠꦼꦩ꧀ꦧꦭꦁ, romanized: Tĕmbalang)	39.47	159,849	189,680	204,865	12	Bulusan, Jangli, Kedungmundu, Kramas, Mangunharjo, Meteseh, Rowosari, Sambiroto, Sendangguwo, Sendangmulyo, Tandang, Tembalang
33.74.06	Pedurungan (Javanese: ꦥꦼꦢꦸꦫꦸꦔꦤ꧀, romanized: Pědurungan)	21.11	180,468	193,151	198,452	12	Gemah, Kalicari, Muktiharjo Kidul, Palebon, Pedurungan Kidul, Pedurungan Lor, Pedurungan Tengah, Penggaron Kidul, Plamongan Sari, Tlogomulyo, Tlogosari Kulon, Tlogosari Wetan,
33.74.05	Genuk (Javanese: ꦒꦼꦤꦸꦏ꧀, romanized: Genuk)	25.98	92,314	123,310	141,033	13	Bangetayu Kulon, Bangetayu Wetan, Banjardowo, Gebangsari, Genuksari, Karangroto, Kudu, Muktiharjo Lor, Penggaron Lor, Sembungharjo, Terboyo Kulon, Terboyo Wetan, Trimulyo
33.74.04	Gayamsari (Javanese: ꦒꦪꦩ꧀ꦱꦫꦶ, romanized: Gayamsari)	6.22	71,767	70,261	70,381	7	Gayamsari, Kaligawe, Pandean Lamper, Sambirejo, Sawah Besar, Siwalan, Tambakrejo
33.74.03	Semarang Timur (East Semarang) (Javanese: ꦱꦼꦩꦫꦁꦮꦺꦠꦤ꧀, romanized: Sěmarang Wétan)	5.42	74,782	66,302	66,482	10	Bugangan, Karangtempel, Karangturi, Kebonagung, Kemijen, Mlatibaru, Mlatiharjo, Rejomulyo, Rejosari, Sarirejo, Bandarharjo
33.74.02	Semarang Utara (North Semarang) (Javanese: ꦱꦼꦩꦫꦁꦭꦺꦴꦂ, romanized: Sěmarang Lor)	11.39	117,836	117,605	117,865	9	Bulu Lor, Dadapsari, Kuningan, Panggung Kidul, Panggung Lor, Plombokan, Purwosari, Tanjungmas
33.74.01	Semarang Tengah (Central Semarang) (Javanese: ꦱꦼꦩꦫꦁꦩꦢꦾ, romanized: Sěmarang Madyå)	5.17	60,312	55,064	55,213	15	Bangunharjo, Brumbungan, Gabahan, Jagalan, Karangkidul, Kauman, Kembangsari, Kranggan, Miroto, Pandansari, Pekunden, Pendrikan Kidul, Pendrikan Lor, Purwodinatan, Sekayu
33.74.13	Semarang Barat (West Semarang) (Javanese: ꦱꦼꦩꦫꦁꦏꦸꦭꦺꦴꦤ꧀, romanized: Sěmarang Kulon)	21.68	154,878	148,879	149,357	16	Bojongsalaman, Bongsari, Cabean, Gisikdrono, Kalibanteng Kidul, Kalibanteng Kulon, Karangayu, Kembangarum, Krapyak, Krobokan, Manyaran, Ngemplaksimongan, Salamanmloyo, Tambakharjo, Tawangmas, Tawangsari
33.74.16	Tugu (Javanese: ꦠꦸꦒꦸ, romanized: Tugu)	28.13	29,436	32,822	34,398	7	Jerakan, Karanganyar, Mangkang Kulon, Mangkang Wetan, Mangunharjo, Randu Garut, Tugurejo
33.74.15	Ngaliyan (Javanese: ꦔꦭꦶꦪꦤ꧀, romanized: Ngaliyan)	42.99	128,415	141,727	147,797	10	Bambankerep, Beringin, Gondoriyo, Kalipancur, Ngaliyan, Podorejo, Purwoyoso, Tambak Aji, Wonosari

== Geography ==
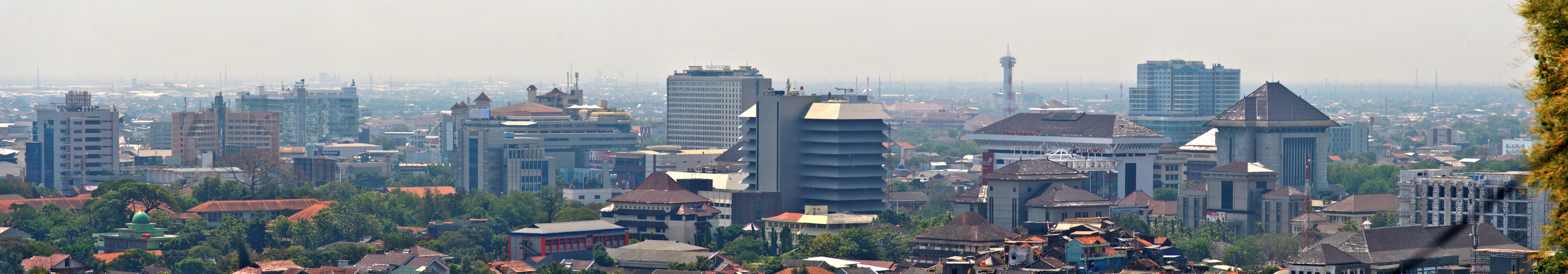
The view of downtown Semarang.

Semarang is located on the northern coast of Java. The municipality lies between 6°50′ and 7°10′ south latitude and 109°35′ and 110°50′ east longitude. It is bounded by Kendal Regency to the west, Demak Regency to the east, Semarang Regency to the south, and the Java Sea to the north. Its coastline is 13.6 km long and its area is 373.78 km². The municipality's elevation ranges from 0.75 to 348 metres above sea level.

Lowland areas in Semarang City are very narrow. The lowland area in western Semarang only has a width of 4 km (2.5 miles) from the coastline, while in the eastern Semarang, the low-lying area has a width of 11 km (6.8 miles) from the coastline. This lowland area is a flood plain from the large rivers that flow in Semarang City, such as Kali Garang (West Flood Canal), Pengkol River, and Bringin River. This low-lying area stretches on the northern side of Semarang and covers almost 40% of the total area of Semarang. This lowland area is known as the lower town (Semarang Ngisor), as well as the center of the city's economic activity. Under these conditions, the lower city area is often hit by annual flooding and its peak during the rainy season. In a number of regions, especially North Semarang, floods are sometimes also caused by overflowing sea tides (tidal floods). The hilly area in Semarang stretches on the south side. These hills are part of a series of northern Java mountain ranges that stretch from Banten to East Java. The hilly area in the city of Semarang is known as the upper city (Semarang Dhuwur). This hilly region is also the upstream area of the big rivers that flow in the city of Semarang. The upper city area is also near Mount Ungaran.

=== Climate ===
Semarang features a tropical monsoon climate (Köppen: Am). The city celebrates Christmas and New Year in summer (due to the location in Southern Hemisphere); however, summer months (December to February) are the rainiest, coldest and wettest months. The city features distinctly wetter and drier months, with winter (June through August) being the driest months and hotter than summer. Spring and autumn are the transitions between wet and dry seasons and hotter than both summer and winter. Semarang on average sees approximately 2,300 mm (91 in) of rain annually. Average temperatures in the city are relatively consistent, hovering around 28 °C (82 °F). Diurnal temperature variation slightly increases in the dry season.

Climate data for Semarang (Jenderal Ahmad Yani Airport) (1991–2020 normals)
Month	Jan	Feb	Mar	Apr	May	Jun	Jul	Aug	Sep	Oct	Nov	Dec	Year
Mean daily maximum °C (°F)	31.2 (88.2)	30.9 (87.6)	31.5 (88.7)	32.2 (90.0)	32.9 (91.2)	32.9 (91.2)	32.9 (91.2)	33.4 (92.1)	34.2 (93.6)	33.8 (92.8)	32.7 (90.9)	31.5 (88.7)	32.5 (90.5)
Daily mean °C (°F)	27.2 (81.0)	27.0 (80.6)	27.6 (81.7)	28.2 (82.8)	28.5 (83.3)	28.1 (82.6)	27.9 (82.2)	28.1 (82.6)	28.4 (83.1)	28.7 (83.7)	28.0 (82.4)	27.4 (81.3)	27.9 (82.3)
Mean daily minimum °C (°F)	24.6 (76.3)	24.4 (75.9)	24.7 (76.5)	25.1 (77.2)	25.3 (77.5)	24.2 (75.6)	23.6 (74.5)	23.3 (73.9)	24.0 (75.2)	24.8 (76.6)	24.9 (76.8)	24.6 (76.3)	24.5 (76.0)
Average precipitation mm (inches)	356.7 (14.04)	379.4 (14.94)	192.8 (7.59)	192.9 (7.59)	136.9 (5.39)	100.1 (3.94)	46.6 (1.83)	45.8 (1.80)	85.9 (3.38)	153.0 (6.02)	235.8 (9.28)	289.5 (11.40)	2,215.4 (87.2)
Average precipitation days	17.3	16.6	13.0	13.0	8.9	6.1	3.7	3.1	4.8	9.8	14.5	17.2	128
Mean monthly sunshine hours	160.6	142.1	177.4	202.1	243.3	235.3	269.1	283.8	267.8	251.1	201.6	152.9	2,587.1
Source 1: Starlings Roost Weather
Source 2: Weather Atlas and Time and Date (humidity only)

=== Semarang River and flood control ===
Like Singapore River, Semarang is constructing Semarang River at Banjir Kanal Barat (Garang River) near Karangayu Bridge. In the middle of July 2011, gardens in river banks and some traditional boats are available to use. The project will be finished in 2013 with river gardens, trotoars, garden lighting, water activities, art sites, sport sites and balconies and stairs for sightseeing. In August 2011, a 421 m (1,380 ft) tunnel dodger at Kreo river has been finished and Jatibarang Dam construction can begin, with completion targeted for July 2013. The dam is planned to release 230 m^{3}/s (8,100 cu ft/s) of flood water and will generate 1.5 MW of electricity, provide a drinking water resource and a boost to tourism.

== Demographics ==
Historical population
Year	Pop.	±%
1906	96,660	—
1920	143,853	+48.8%
1922	136,424	−5.2%
1925	149,092	+9.3%
1926	165,963	+11.3%
1927	174,027	+4.9%
1928	179,079	+2.9%
1929	185,717	+3.7%
1930	188,172	+1.3%
1931	331,059	+75.9%
1950	371,000	+12.1%
1952	341,844	−7.9%
1955		—
1960	424,374	—
1965	485,444	+14.4%
1970	552,128	+13.7%
1975	626,703	+13.5%
1980	782,967	+24.9%
1985	1,009,460	+28.9%
1990	1,125,836	+11.5%
1995	1,242,737	+10.4%
2000	1,333,157	+7.3%
2005	1,427,341	+7.1%
2010	1,438,733	+0.8%
2015	1,555,984	+8.1%
2020	1,698,777	+9.2%
2025	1,722,421	+1.4%
Year 1906-1952 (except 1950) is from Moehkardi (2021) while the others are from BPS (2026 and earlier) and World Population Review; Source:

The largest ethnic group in Semarang is the Javanese, followed by minorities of Chinese, Arabs, Indian, and others (including local ethnicities such as Sundanese, Batak, Madura, Malay, Balinese etc.). The dominant religion is Islam with a significant Christian minority. Semarang has a large Chinese community. As in other regions of Java, especially in Central Java, they have mingled closely with the local population and use Javanese in communication for hundreds of years. About 3.5% of the city's population is ethnic Chinese, many residing in a Chinatown in the vicinity of Gang Pinggir. The Chinatown is called "Kampong Pecinan Semawis" and expresses many aspects of traditional Chinese culture including foods, rituals, and houses of worship.

== Economy ==
In 1939, according to Moehkardi citing Encyclopaedia Britannica, exports from Port of Semarang reached 38,522,000 gulden (accounting for approximately 5% of total exports from the Dutch East Indies) while the imports through the port reached 48,774,000 gulden, representing about 10% of the total imports of the colony.

In 2025, Semarang's gross regional domestic product (GRDP) at current prices was 288.05 trillion rupiah, compared with 267.62 trillion rupiah in 2024 and 204.87 trillion rupiah in 2021. At constant 2010 prices, real GRDP growth was 6.49% in 2025, following positive growth in each year from 2021 to 2025. Gross fixed capital formation accounted for 60.92% of GRDP and household final consumption for 40.88%; Semarang contributed 14.83% of the economy of Central Java in 2025.

Semarang GRDP, 2021–2025
Year	GRDP at current prices (trillion rupiah)	GRDP at 2010 constant prices (trillion rupiah)	Real GRDP growth
2021	204.87	144.70	5.16%
2022	227.37	153.00	5.73%
2023	248.85	161.82	5.77%
2024	267.62	171.01	5.68%
2025	288.05	182.12	6.49%

GRDP distribution by expenditure component, 2021–2025
Component	2021	2022	2023	2024	2025
Household final consumption	40.87%	40.46%	40.98%	41.06%	40.88%
Gross fixed capital formation	65.76%	61.65%	59.29%	60.23%	60.92%
Government consumption	11.67%	10.59%	10.28%	10.05%	9.73%
NPISHs final consumption	0.76%	0.78%	0.80%	0.86%	0.86%
Changes in inventories	0.43%	0.54%	0.55%	0.14%	0.45%
Net exports	−19.49%	−14.03%	−11.90%	−12.34%	−12.85%

Semarang is the capital of Central Java and forms part of the Kedungsepur national strategic area, whose regional role includes trade, services, industry, and education.

== Transportation ==
=== Road ===
Semarang is on the Indonesian National Route 1 road, which connects it to Merak and Ketapang (Banyuwangi). Indonesian National Route 14 toward Bawen starts here. Semarang has a toll road, the Semarang Toll Road. The city is connected to Solo by Semarang–Solo Toll Road.

Semarang's largest bus terminals are Mangkang and Terboyo. The primary means of public transportation is by minibus, called "bis". Ojek (motorcycle taxis), Angkot (share-taxi) micro-buses, taxi-cabs plays vital role in public transportation of the city. Go-Jek and Grab have online taxi and Ojek services.

Semarang is served by bus rapid transit called Trans Semarang, which operates in six routes. Perum DAMRI also serves in six designated routes in the city.

=== Rail ===
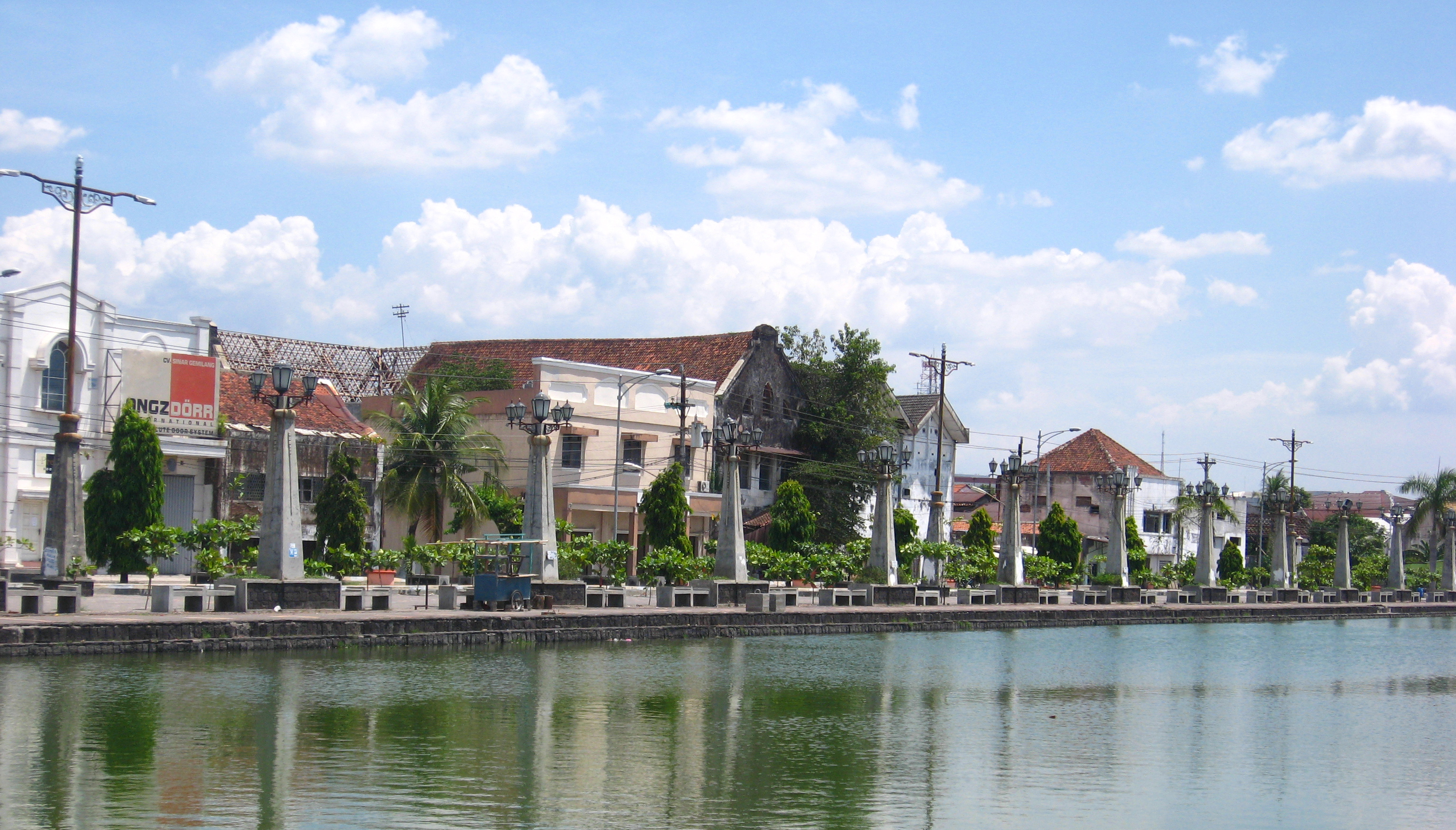
Semarang Old Town seen from Semarang Tawang railway station.

Semarang was connected to Surakarta (Solo) by a rail line in 1870. At present there are two large train stations in Semarang: Semarang Poncol and Semarang Tawang. Semarang is connected to Bandung, Jakarta, and Surabaya by inter-city train services. Kedungsepur commuter rail connects Semarang Poncol Station eastward to Ngrombo Station in Grobogan Regency.

=== Air ===
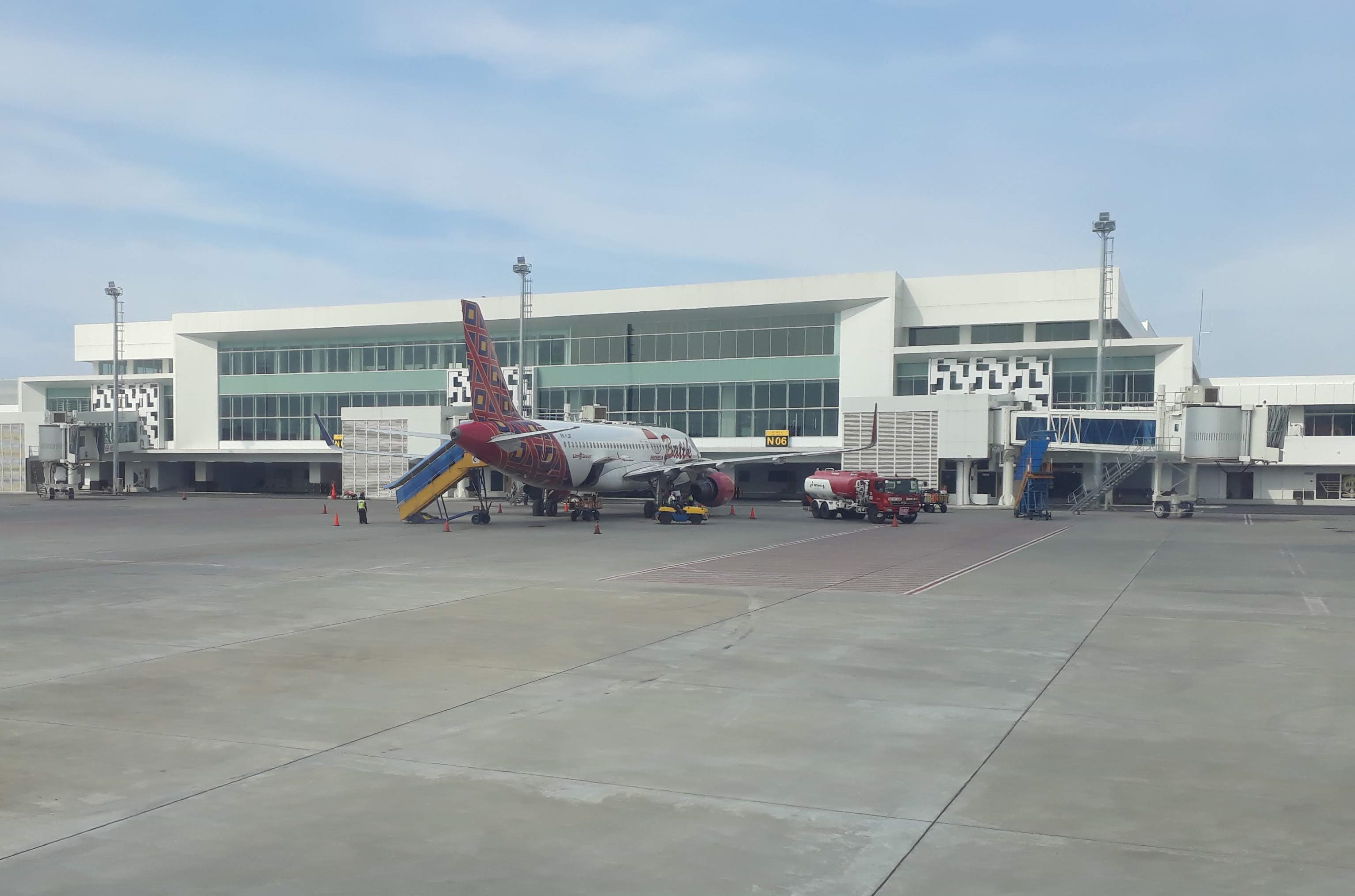
Ahmad Yani International Airport.

Semarang's Ahmad Yani International Airport is served by a number of operators. In 2018, the airport terminal was relocated to a new and much larger site; the old terminal continues to be used for government and military flights.

=== Sea ===
The main seaport is the Tanjung Mas seaport.

== Landmarks and places of interest ==
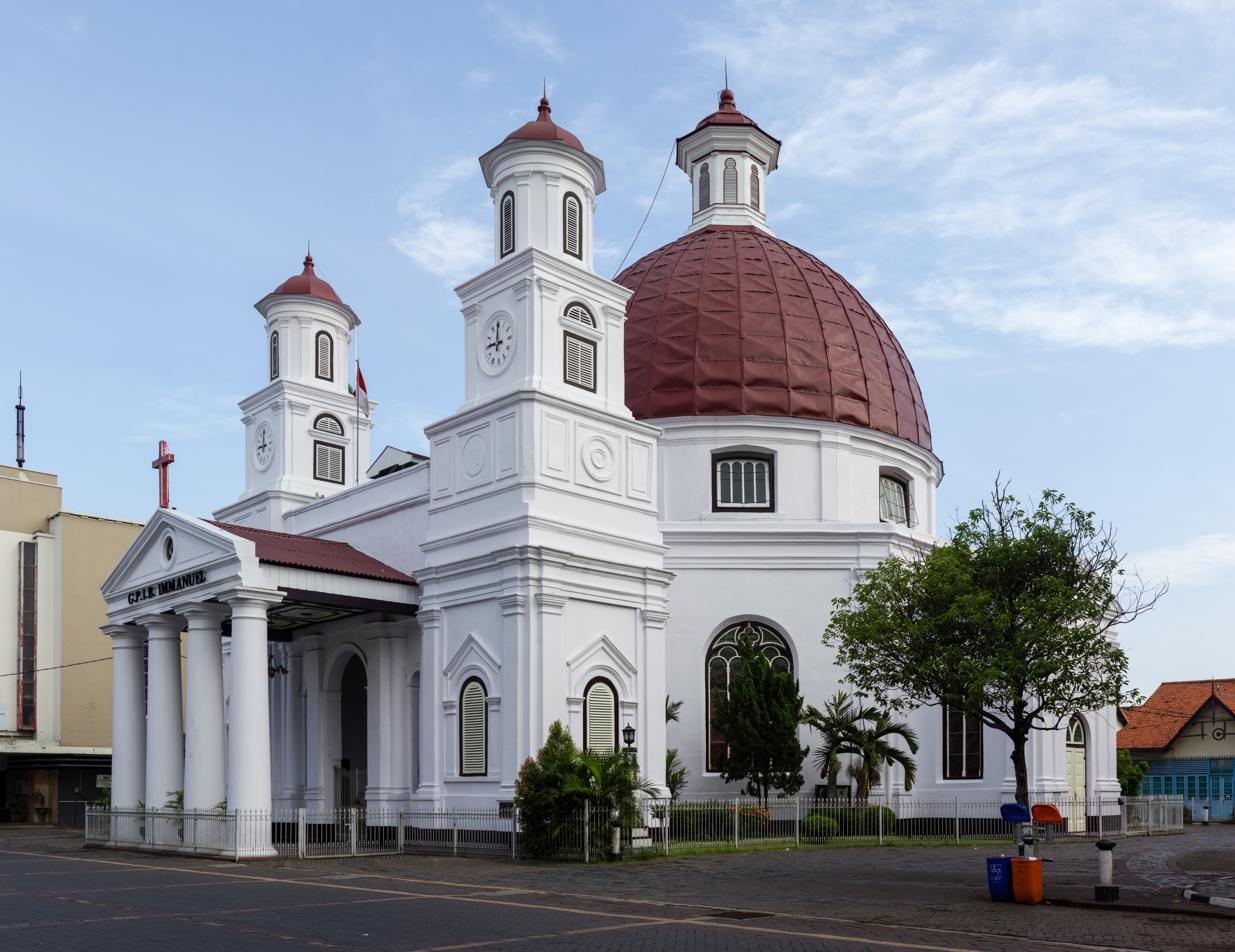
Blenduk Church, the oldest church in Central Java.

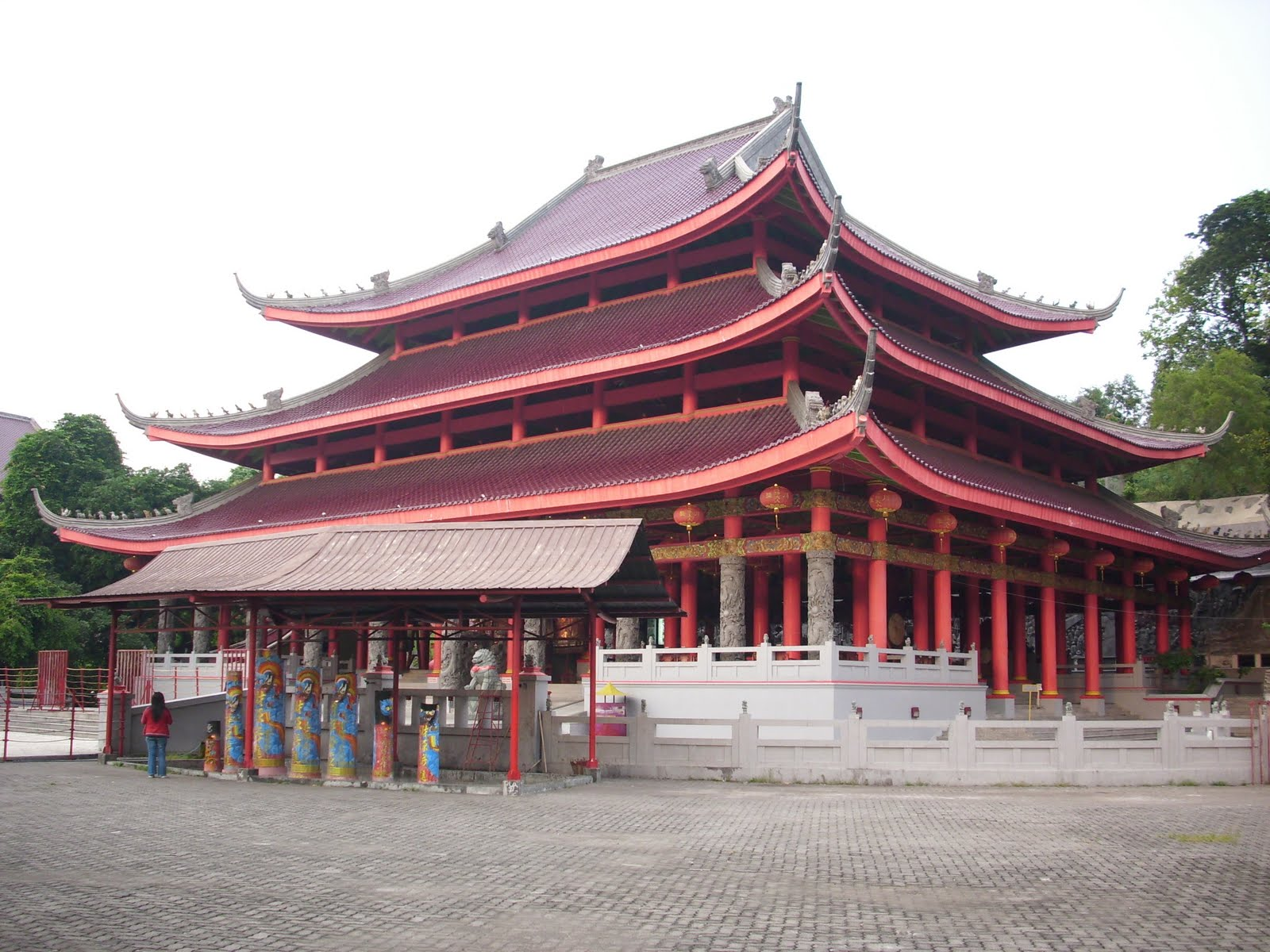
Sam Poo Kong, the oldest Chinese temple in the city.

- Semarang old town (Kota Lama), which is sometimes referred to by locals as "Little Netherlands." It was established in the 18th century when Indonesia was a Dutch colony. There are more than 50 well-maintained colonial buildings in Kota Lama, displaying 18th, 19th, and 20th century European-influenced architecture.
- China Town: Chinatown in Semarang has a night market known as 'Pasar Semawis', which is known for its cuisine and Chinese new year celebration.
- Tugu Muda (Youth Monument) is a monument built to commemorate the services of the heroes who have fallen in the Battle of Five Days in Semarang. The height of Tugu Muda is 53 meters. Tugu Muda is located in front of Lawang Sewu at Pemuda street. It depicts the Tugu Muda fighting spirit and patriotism of Semarang residents, especially the youth who are persistent, self-sacrificing in high spirits maintaining the independence of Indonesia.
- Lawang Sewu (Javanese for "A Thousand Doors") was built as the headquarters of the Dutch East Indies Railway Company. The colonial era building is reputedly a haunted house.
- Blenduk Church (Nederlandsch Indische Kerk) was built in 1753, the church is one of the oldest building in Kota Lama.
- The Sam Poo Kong temple is the oldest Chinese temple in the city. Tay Kak Sie Temple was established in 1746, it is dedicated to Guanyin Bodhisattva and various Taoist Deities.
- Central Java Grand Mosque: This mosque has a Muslim museum, located at Jl. Gajah Raya. The architecture of the mosque is inspired by the mosques in Mecca and Medina.
- Vihara Buddhagaya Watugong: The 45 m (148 ft) Buddhist temple has been named by MURI as the highest pagoda in Indonesia. It's located at Jl. Perintis Kemerdekaan Watugong, about 45 minutes drive from the center.
- Pancasila Square: Located within the heart of Simpang Lima City Center (SLCC) CBD; is an infamous public arena at the town center. It has tourist pedicabs, cars, bicycles, chairs, pedestrian track, public toilet, roller skates, traditional games, grass field and others.

== Culture ==
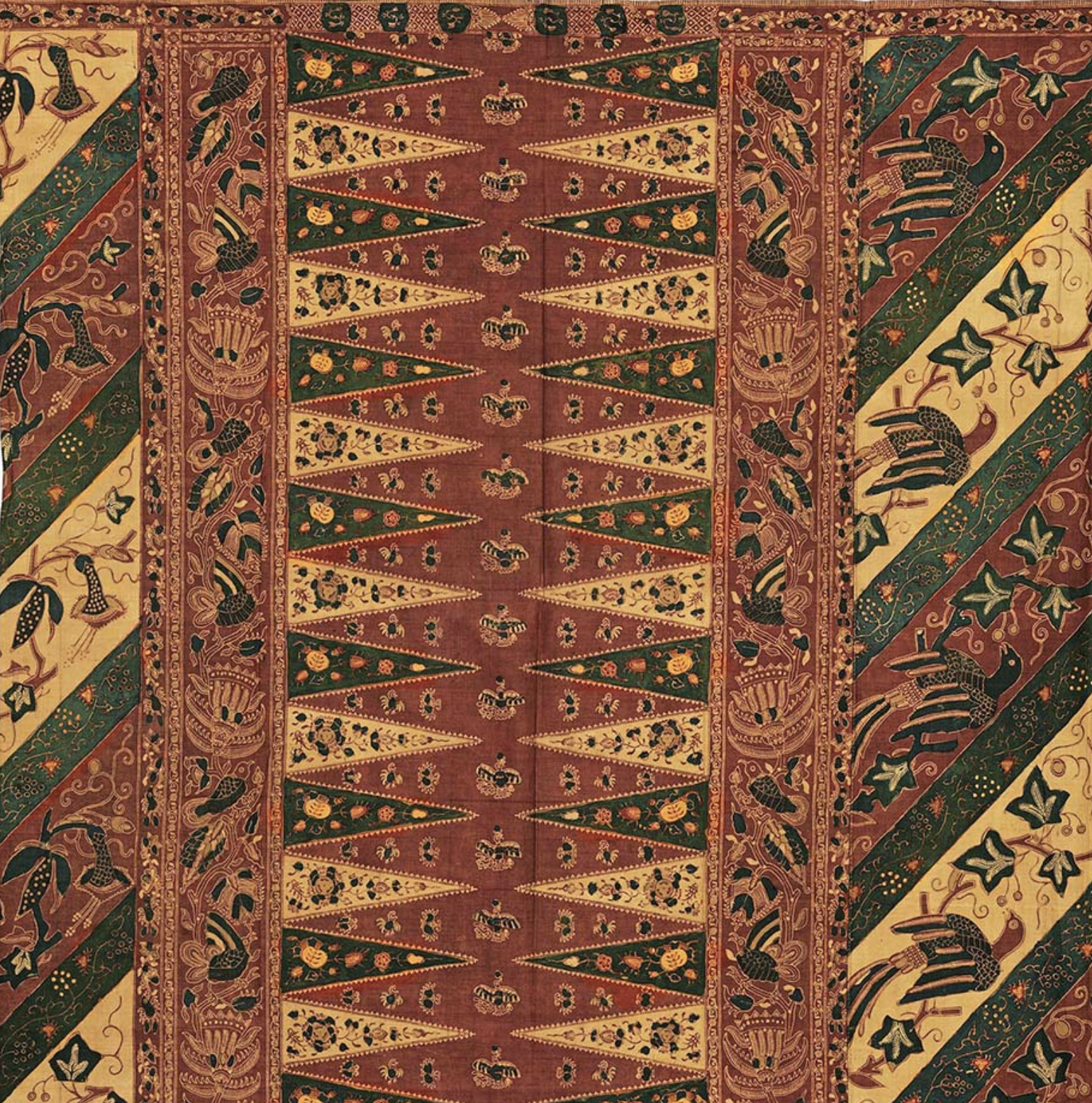
Semarang (?) batik made prior to 1867, in the workshop owned by batik pioneer Carolina Josephina von Franquemont (1817–1867). Photo courtesy of the Queen Sirikit Museum of Textiles, Bangkok

=== Education ===
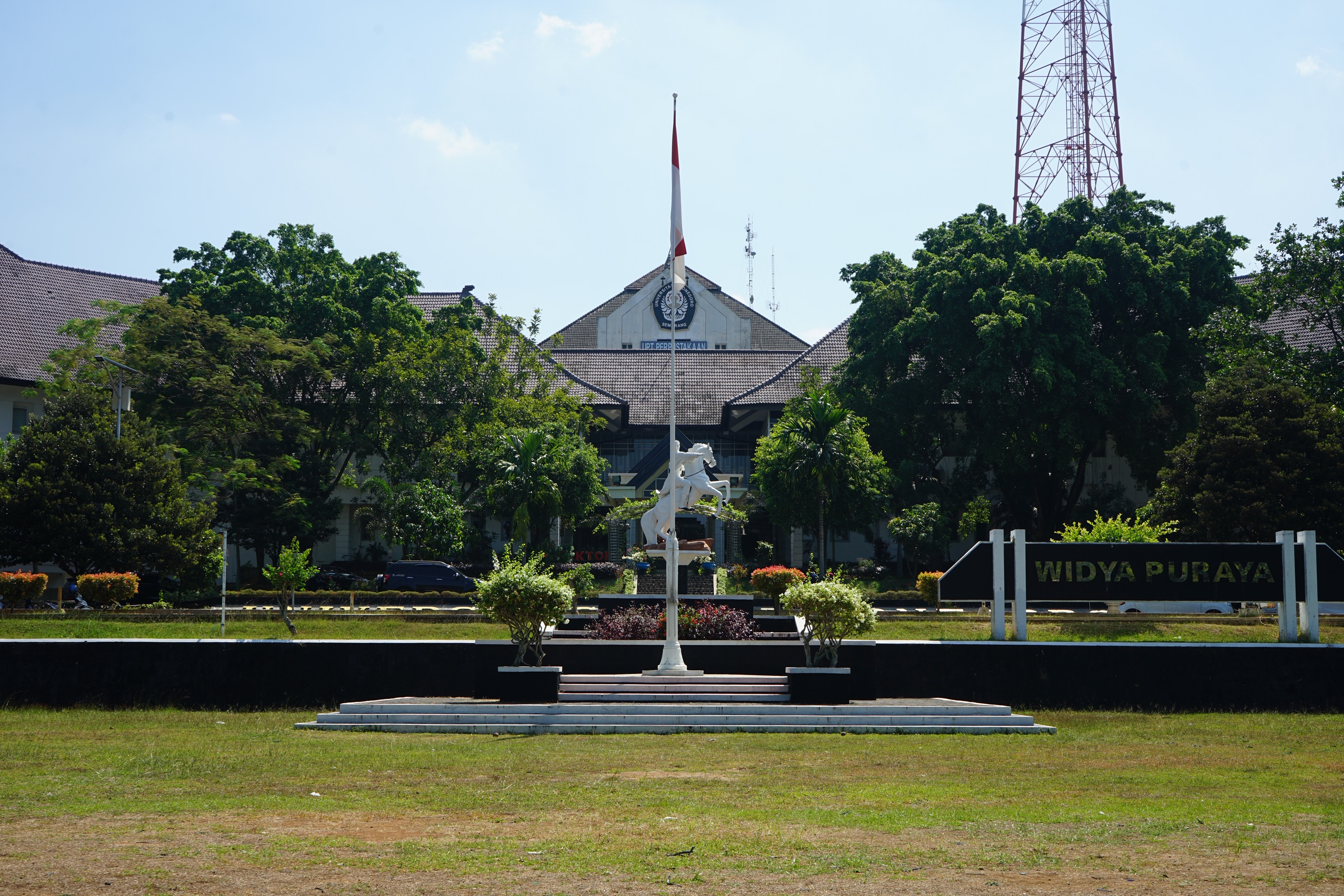
Diponegoro University

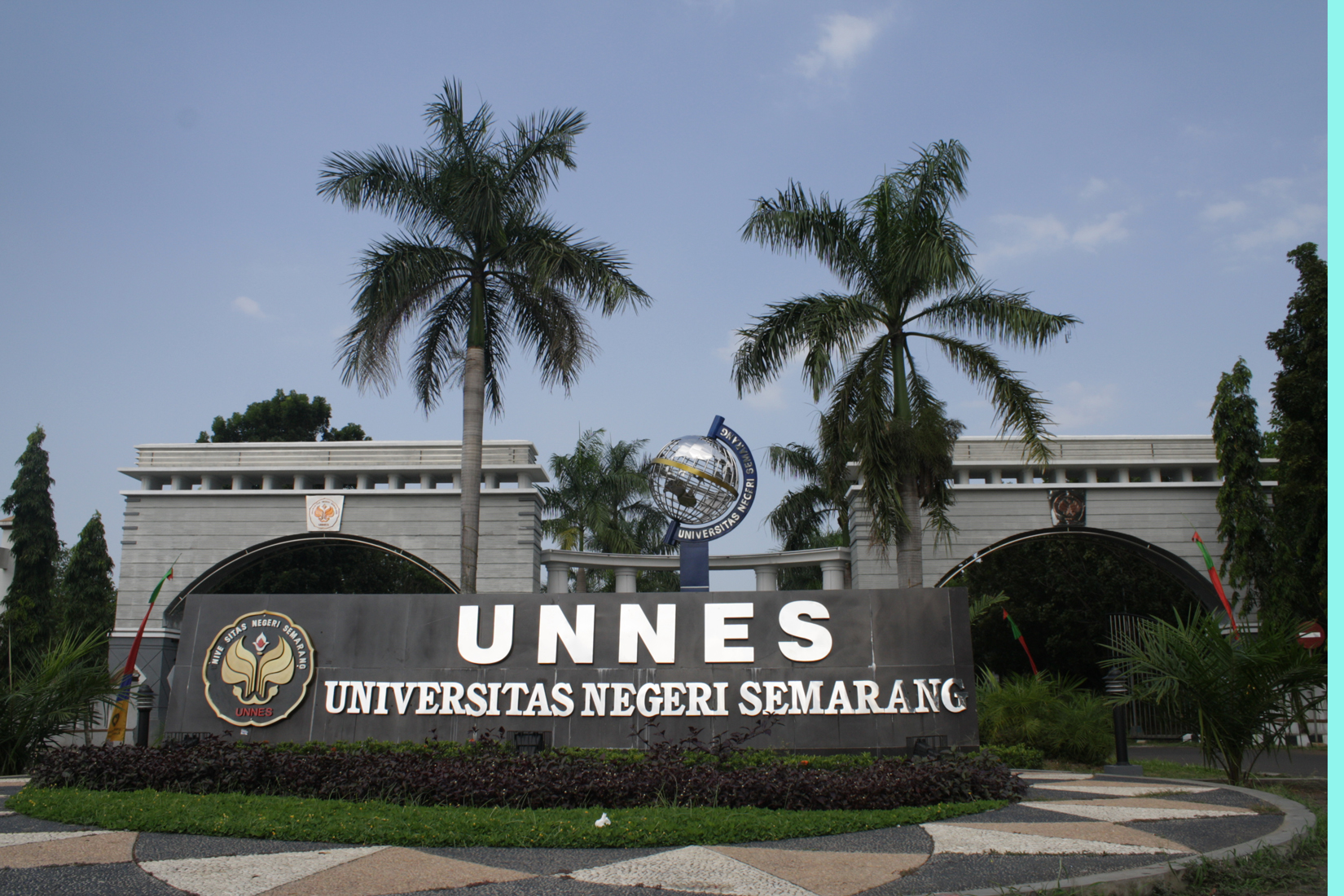
Semarang State University campus gate

There are 593 elementary schools, 220 junior high schools, 106 senior high schools, and 88 vocational high schools, both public and private in Semarang.

There are 20 universities in Semarang, 12 of them private and 8 public. The most renowned universities of Semarang are Diponegoro University and Soegijapranata University.

- Diponegoro University (UNDIP): It is one of national or state-owned universities in Semarang, founded in 1957. The university has 11 faculties and 2 schools: Faculty of Economics and Business, Faculty of Social and Political Sciences, Faculty of Humanities, Faculty of Law, Faculty of Medicine, Faculty of Engineering, Faculty of Fishery and Marine Sciences, Faculty of Natural Sciences and Mathematics, Faculty of Public Health, Faculty of Animal Agriculture, Faculty of Psychology, Vocational School, and Postgraduate School. The university also offers a postgraduate program. Diponegoro University is one of the best universities in Indonesia.
- Semarang State University in Indonesian Universitas Negeri Semarang (UNNES): It is one of national or state-owned universities in Semarang, founded in 1965. The university has 8 faculties and Postgraduate School: Faculty of Science Education, Faculty of Engineering, Faculty of Language and Art, Faculty of Sport Science, Faculty of Social Science, Faculty of Economics, Faculty of Law, and Faculty of mathematics and science. Semarang State University is one of the best university in Indonesia.
- Soegijapranata Catholic University (UNIKA): It is one of the private universities in Semarang, founded in 1982. There are 8 faculties in UNIKA: Faculty of Architecture and Design, Faculty of Law and Communication, Faculty of Engineering, Faculty of Language and Arts, Faculty of Economics and Business, Faculty of Agricultural and Technology, Faculty of Psychology, and Faculty of Computer Science.
- Muhammadiyah University of Semarang (UNIMUS): It is one of the private universities in Semarang, founded in 1996. On 4 August 1999 the Minister of Education and Culture of the Republic of Indonesia issued an Operational Permit for the University of Muhammadiyah Semarang with number: 139/D/O/1999. 14 study programs that obtained operational permits at the beginning of the opening in 1999 including: Public Health Study Program (Bachelor's degree), Statistics Study Program (Bachelor's degree), Mechanical Engineering Study Program (Bachelor and Diploma degree), Electrical Engineering Study Program (Bachelor and Diploma degree), Food Technology Study Program (Bachelor's degree), Agricultural Technology Study Program (Bachelor's degree), Management Study Program (Bachelor's degree), Company Administration Study Program (Diploma degree), Accounting Study Program (Diploma degree), English Language Study Program (Bachelor's degree), English Language Study Program (Diploma degree) and Japanese Language Study Program (Diploma degree).
- In Semarang, there is also a public university providing education through distance learning or distance education at Universitas Terbuka (Indonesia Open University).

=== Sports ===
There are several sport centres in Semarang. Jatidiri sport centre or Jatidiri Stadium is one of the biggest sport centres in Semarang, located in Karangrejo, Gajahmungkur. The centre comprises a soccer field, in line skate track, tennis filed, climbing wall, swimming pool, and many others. The capacity of the centre is about 21,000 people.

Knight Stadium is a futsal and basketball centre in Semarang, located in Grand Marina complex. There is a café and fitness centre in Knight Stadium.

=== Cuisine ===
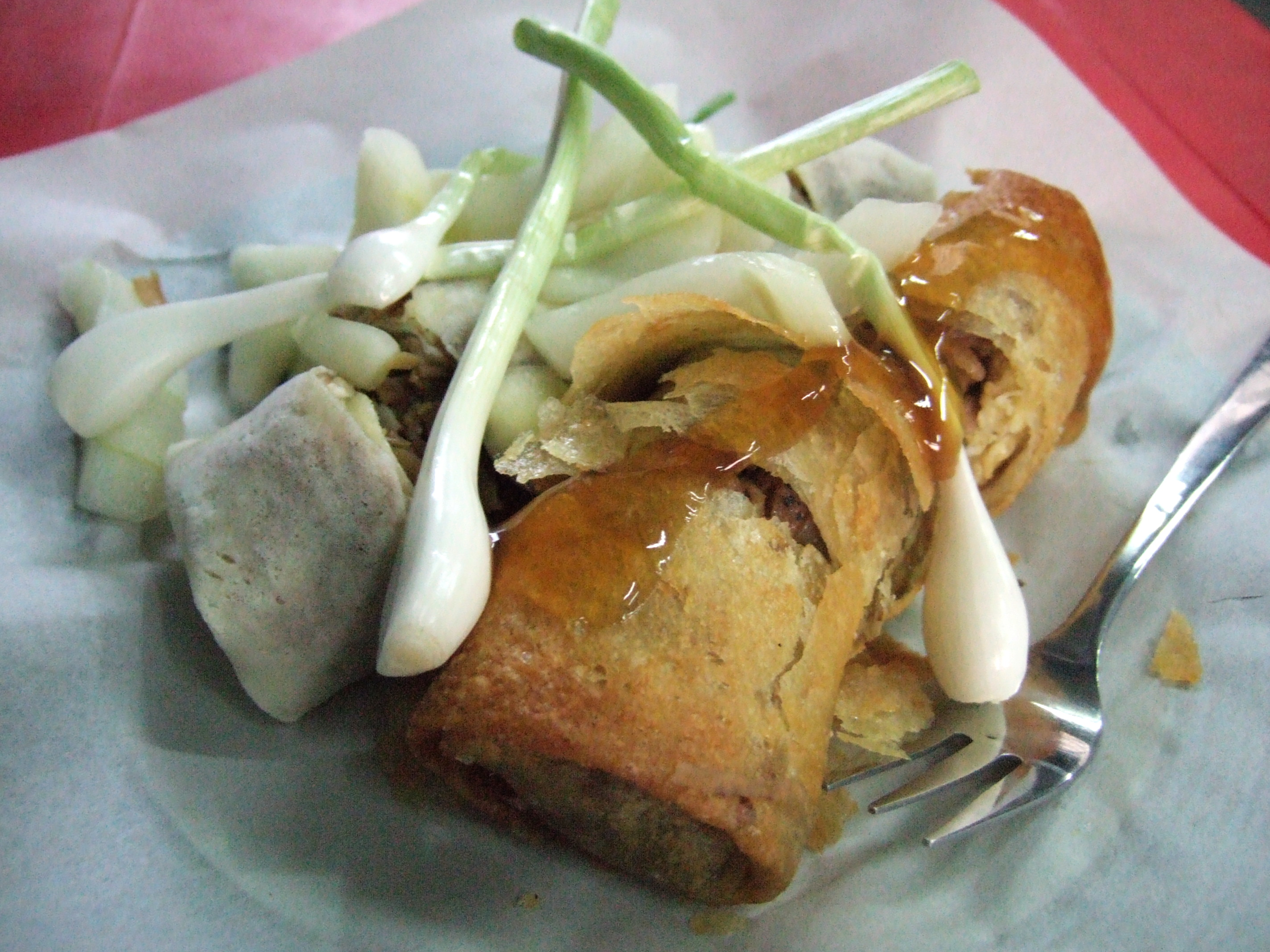
Lumpia Semarang.

Semarang is widely known for its bandeng presto (pressure-cooked milkfish), Lumpia, Wingko, Tahu Gimbal, and Ganjel Rel. Semarang has also been called 'The city of Jamu' because it is an important centre for the production of jamu which are a range of Indonesian herbal medicines that are popular across Indonesia Semawis Market, also known as Pecinan Semarang (Semarang's Chinatown), hosts a plethora of street food vendors, offering a wide varieties of dishes.

=== Festivals ===
Dugderan is an annual festival in Semarang designated to welcome the Ramadan month (a fasting month for Moslems). The word "dug" describes the sound of bedug (traditional Indonesian musical instrument). The word "der" describes the sound of fireworks.

The icon of the festival is a special puppet dragon-like animal called Warak Ngendog. The word "warak" stands for "holy" and the word "ngendog" expresses a reward for Muslims. Warak Ngendog's feet are chained, representing people's desire that should be postponed during this holy month. As Dugderan is a festival unique for Semarang, it represents an important attraction for both local people and visitors.

=== Media ===
Suara Merdeka is the major local newspaper in Semarang, as well as Central Java. Other major newspapers include Tribun Jateng and Wawasan.

== Awards ==
Semarang has received the Adipura Award 6 times in a row since 2012. The Adipura Award is given for achievement in cleanliness and greenery at parks, streets, markets, shop buildings, premises, schools, even cleanliness of water ways and rivers. Semarang City received the title of Best Smart Living and Best Smart Economy City in the Indonesia Smart Nation Award 2018.

== Greater Semarang ==
Greater Semarang (known as Kedungsepur) was initially defined by the government as Semarang city, Semarang Regency, Salatiga city, Kendal Regency, and Demak Regency. It was later extended to include the western part (12 districts only) of Grobogan Regency. Despite the definition, rural and urban cores remain distinct and have not amalgamated into a continuous urban sprawl as is the case in Greater Jakarta.

Delineation of Semarang metropolitan area
Administrative division	Area in km^{2}	Pop'n 2010 census	Pop'n 2020 census	No. of districts	No. of villages
City of Semarang	373.78	1,555,984	1,653,524	16	177
City of Salatiga	57.36	170,332	192,322	4	23
Demak Regency	900.12	1,055,579	1,203,956	14	249
Grobogan Regency (part)	1,396.32	797,160	888,581	12	191
Kendal Regency	1,118.13	900,313	1,018,505	20	286
Semarang Regency	950.21	930,727	1,053,094	19	235
Total Kedungsepur	4,795.92	5,410,095	6,009,982	85	1,161

Sources: BPS Jateng

== Notable people ==
- Agung Laksono, politician and former chairman of the House of Representatives.
- Jihane Almira Chedid, beauty queen.
- Anindya Kusuma Putri, Puteri Indonesia 2015 and Top 15 of Miss Universe 2015.
- Anne Avantie, fashion designer.
- Aries Susanti Rahayu, speed climbing world champion.
- Be Biauw Tjoan, Majoor-titulair der Chinezen, magnate, revenue farmer and bureaucrat
- Conrad Emil Lambert Helfrich, Dutch admiral.
- Daniel Sahuleka, Dutch musician.
- F. H. van Naerssen, Dutch professor of Indonesian and Malay and expert on Javanese epigraphy
- Fuad Hassan, politician, former Minister of Education and Culture.
- Hubertus van Mook, Dutch politician.
- Jaya Suprana, musician, writer, TV talkshow host, founder of MURI
- Lee Chin Koon, the father of Lee Kuan Yew, the founding father of modern day Singapore.
- Liem Bwan Tjie, architect.
- Max van Egmond, bass and baritone singer of Baroque and Renaissance music.
- Oei Hui-lan, First Lady of the Republic of China, international socialite and fashion icon.
- Oei Tiong Ham, Majoor-titulair der Chinezen, Chinese Indonesian tycoon.
- P. F. Dahler, politician, member of Investigating Committee for Preparatory Work for Independence (BPUPK).
- Purnomo Yusgiantoro, politician and former Minister of Defence.
- Raden Saleh, painter.
- Rob Nieuwenhuys, literary historian and author.
- Sri Oetari Ratna Dewi, politician
- Stella Cornelia, singer and actress, ex-member of JKT48
- Sutiyoso, chief of Indonesian Intelligence Bureau (BIN).
- Tukul Arwana, comedian and television personality.
- Willem Einthoven, medical doctor, invented electrocardiography (ECG), Nobel Prize winner.
- Robert Lansdorp, Dutch-American professional tennis coach

== Sister cities ==
Semarang is twinned with:

- Brisbane, Australia
- Da Nang, Vietnam
- Fuzhou, China

== See also ==
- Semarang metropolitan area
