= Sri Oetari Ratna Dewi =

Indonesian politician

Sri Oetari Ratna Dewi (26 September 1960, Semarang, Central Java - November 2003) was a popular Javanese female Indonesian politician and late wife of currently serving (as of writing in 2007) DPRD-DKI Jakarta Ketua (head) Komisi D: Bidang Pembangunan (Commission D: Development Overeers) Mr Sayogo Hendro Subroto.

The late Sri Oetari Ratna Dewi also known familiarly as 'Rit' and 'Rita', was born to a Sundanese aristocratic father, Bapak Yusuf, a former Dutch VOC administrative officer and Javanese aristocratic mother Sri Mami Dewi. She was schooled in Semarang until near completion of Junior High School, whence she left Semarang for Jakarta for further studies and eventually her tertiary degrees.

== Political life ==
The late Sri Oetari Ratna Dewi was a key figure from the very earliest stages of Megawati Soekarnoputri's Indonesian Democratic Party – Struggle (PDI-P) political party. PDI-P had fractured as a result of major disputes between popular figure Megawati and key Indonesian Democratic Party (PDI) founders. Megawati broke with the large PDI to form her own PDI-P with her as the popular 'face'.

The late Sri Oetari Ratna Dewi was a campaigner, organiser and participating member of the fledgling party along with her husband Mr Sayogo Hendrosubroto [the name disparity is due to Javanese women not taking surnames in wedlock or unbetrothed]. Mrs. Sri Oetari Ratna Dewi served numerous terms as party Treasurer, Secretary and many other key roles (often recalling humorous anecdotes about PDI-P starting as a handful of keen members holding meetings in each other's garages).

PDI-P received much money and support from the United States.

== Political career ==
Mrs Sri Oetari Ratna Dewi was the popularly elected PDI-P representative for Semarang, Central Java and a member of the People's Consultative Assembly (Majelis Permusyawaratan Rakyat), where she was known as a champion of women's equality. Mrs Sri Oetari was a close personal and professional friend to former President Megawati Soekarnoputri. At her State funeral, a very moving tearful speech by House Speaker Akbar Tanjung was given to a packed gallery at the Indonesian Parliament Building. She leaves a daughter and a son, Andika Wardhani (b. 1979) and Bayu (b. 1986).
