= Hendrik Tillema =

Dutch colonial official, writer and hygienist

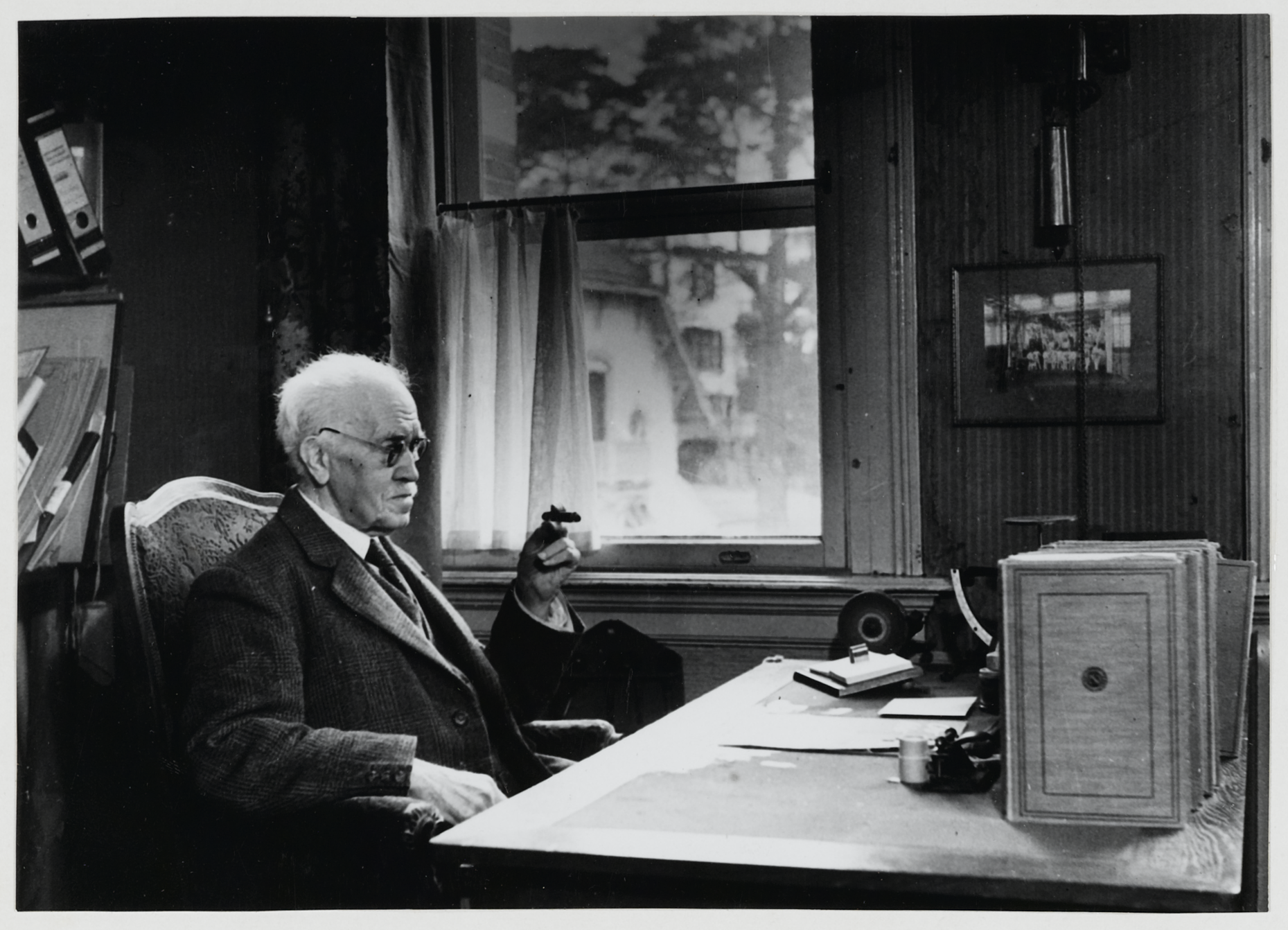
Dr. H.F. Tillema, c. 1935

Hendrik Freerk Tillema (5 July 1870 in Echten–26 November 1952 in Bloemendaal) was a colonial Dutch official, writer, and hygienist in the Dutch East Indies (now Indonesia).

== Life ==
Tillema was born in 1870. Living in Semarang on Java in the Dutch East Indies, he was a pharmacist and social reformer. His program of "village improvement" (Dutch: kampongverbetering) aimed to improve living conditions and health among the native Javanese. He worked with city doctor Willem Thomas de Vogel to try to develop healthier land in the nearby hills, relieving overcrowding and improving health among Semarang's poor, but was unable to sway the rest of the city council. The land he and de Vogel purchased was eventually used for Thomas Karsten's upscale residential district New Candi (Nieuw Tjandi), now Candisari. He died in 1952.

== Works ==
- Van Wonen en Bewonen, Van Bouwen, Huis en Erf [Of House and Home, Building, House and Site], Den Haag: H. Uden Masman, 1913. (Dutch)
- Kromoblanda: Over 't Vraagstuk van het Wonen in Kromo's Groote Land, vol. 1–6, 's-Gravenhage: H. Uden Masman, 1915–1923. (Dutch)
- Een Filmreis naar en door Centraal-Borneo, Amsterdam: Van Munster, 1938. (Dutch)
