= Willem Thomas de Vogel =

Dutch East Indies public health official

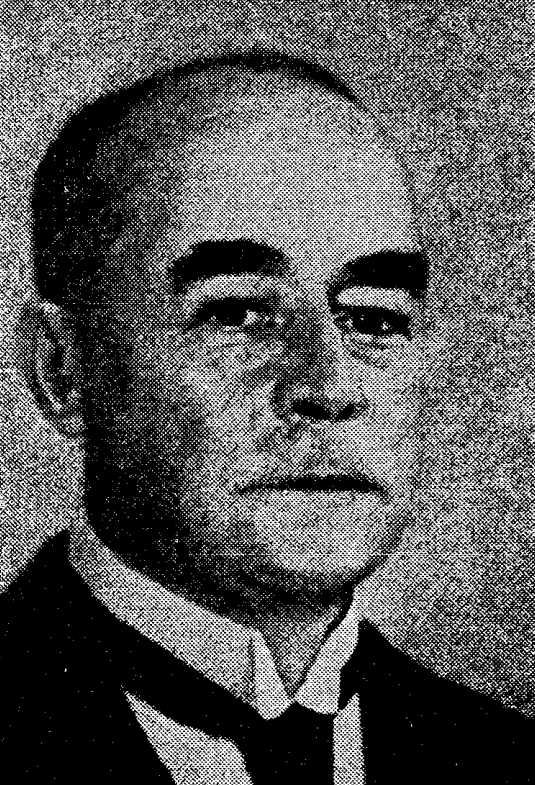
W. Th. de Vogel in 1921

Willem Thomas de Vogel (26 March 1863 – 10 March 1955) was a colonial Dutch doctor and official who established the Department of Public Health in the Dutch East Indies.

== Life ==
=== Early life ===
Willem Thomas de Vogel was born on 26 March 1863 in Toeban (now Tuban), Lasem (now Rembang), on Java in the Dutch East Indies. His father Henri Adrien Frédéric de Vogel (24 January 1825 – 17 August 1897) was Dutch but his mother Augusta Mary Stavers de Vogel (16 December 1840 – 4 January 1915) English; his sisters were Frances Maria Wilhelmina de Vogel Monod de Froideville (26 December 1859 – 4 March 1904), Frédérique Jeanne Louise de Vogel Einthoven (7 September 1861 –31 January 1937), Augusta Henriette de Vogel (20 January 1866 – 8 December 1959), Rosetta Catherina Albertine de Vogel (16 January 1868 – 19 January 1949), and Catherine Elisabeth de Vogel Julius Roelants (4 July 1871 – 28 June 1959). He received his primary education from private tutors but went to Arnhem in the Netherlands for gymnasium. He began university at Leiden in 1883, majoring in mathematics and physics, but in late 1884 his father lost his fortune, causing De Vogel to drop out of school. Instead, he worked on Nicholaas Beets, a sailing ship running between the Netherlands and Batavia (now Jakarta). His family considered this work to be beneath him, and he began running a cinchona plantation to produce quinine under the guidance of a Mr. Eekhout. He returned to study medicine in Leiden from 1886–1892 thanks to financial assistance from his cousin and brother-in-law Willem Einthoven; he graduated with honors on 19 January 1893, turning in a thesis focused on Einthoven's pioneering use of electrocardiograms to diagnose and treat heart conditions.

=== Medical career ===
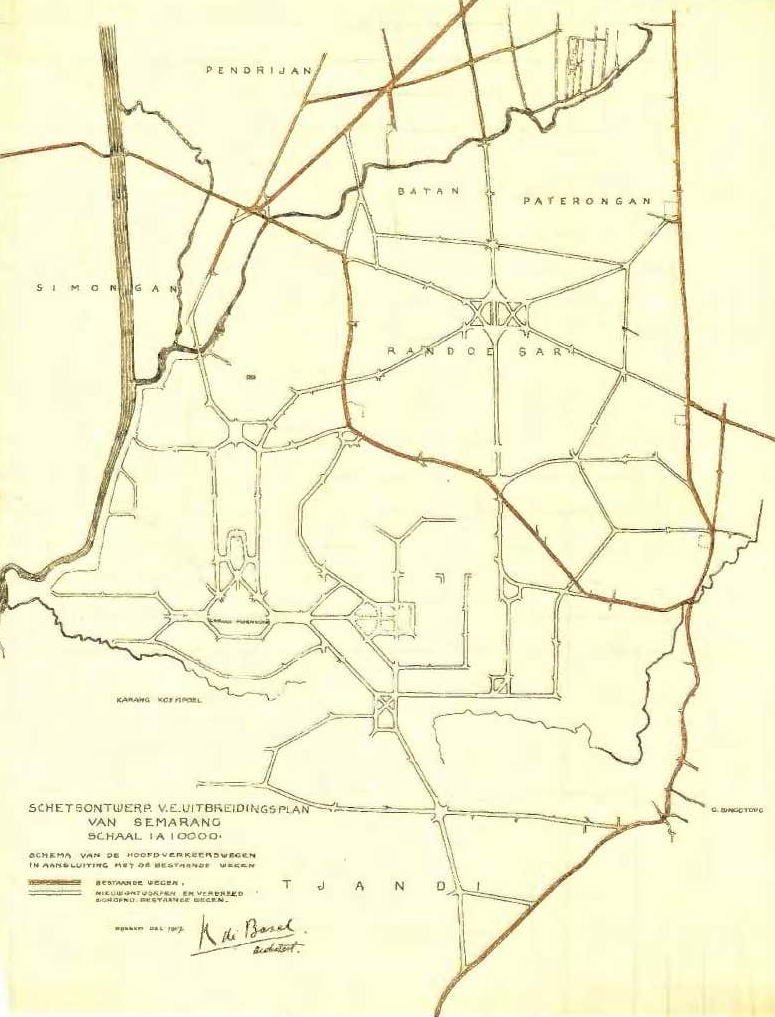
The original 1907 plan for expanding Semarang into its healthier highlands

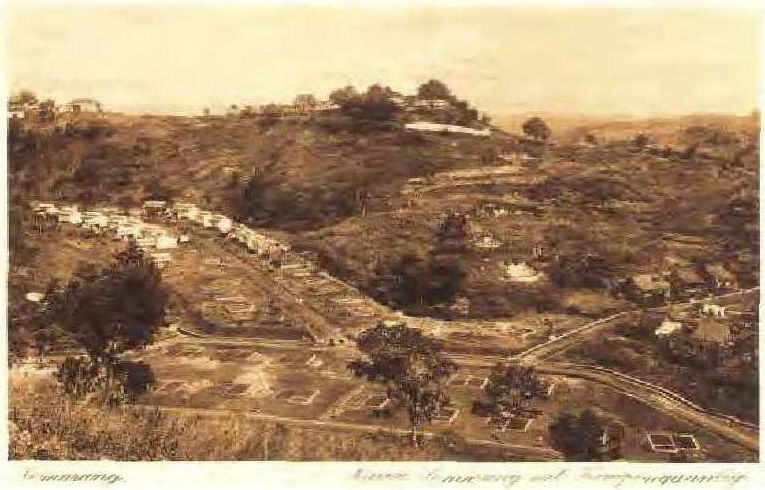
The actual gentrified development in 1917

Leaving for the East Indies two days after graduating, he worked as a local physician at the sugar plantations in Tegal on Java from 1893 to November 1895, overseeing early smallpox vaccination efforts there. The death rate among plantation coolies had run as high as 10%; improved medical care and greater attention to sanitary living conditions reduced that to 1%. Selling his practice, de Vogel repaid his debts and returned to Europe for specialized training in internal medicine, bacteriology, and psychiatry in Berlin, Germany. He learned ophthalmology working under Herman Snellen in Utrecht in late 1896 and won a grant from the Donders Memorial Fund the next year which allowed him to study under Theodor Leber at Heidelberg and Ernst Fuchs at Vienna, Austria.

Marrying Suzanna Catherina Bierman (29 August 1877 – 25 January 1954) on 14 September 1897, he returned to the East Indies in July of the next year and began a practice in Semarang, whose lower town constantly suffered from dysentery, typhoid, cholera, and malaria. He was active in the Association of Doctors in the Dutch Indies (Bond van Nederlandsch-Indische Artsen), helping colonial administrators regularize medical provision and assistance. De Vogel took charge of the local insane asylum in 1899, became the chief state physician for the city in 1901, and performed important research in the transmission of malaria through mosquitoes over the next decade, aside from a year and a half he was forced to take off for medical reasons. When local leaders ignored his arguments to limit future growth of the pestilential lower city, he and colleagues like Hendrik Tillema began purchasing estates in the nearby highlands which they then gave or sold to the city to encourage more healthful living conditions; the city accepted the land but did nothing with it for a decade. H. Thomas Karsten's eventual plan for the area omitted any space for low-income housing (kampongs) and instead filled it with spacious roads and expansive villas, creating the district that now comprises Semarang's Candisari neighborhood (Nieuw Tjandi). De Vogel was named an officer of Order of Orange–Nassau in 1906 and served as one of the Dutch East Indies' representatives to the 14th International Congress of Hygiene and Demography in Berlin the next year. Shortly thereafter, he founded the Dutch Society for Tropical Medicine (Dutch: Nederlandsche Vereeniging voor Tropische Geneeskunde) with Dr. van der Scheer. Having judged traditional Indonesian medicine unhelpful during the large cholera outbreak from 1908–1909, he subsequently ignored its practice but vehemently rejected any official use as unscientific.

De Vogel was elected a coressponding member of the Royal Netherlands Academy of Arts and Sciences in 1909 (of which he resigned in 1922). He was named a lieutenant inspector (inspecteur-souschef) for the Civil Medical Service (Burgerlijk Geneeskundige Dienst) in 1911, a knight in the Order of the Dutch Lion in 1912, and the chief inspector (hoofdinspecteur) in 1913, prompting his family to move to Batavia. During this time, he established the colony's quarantine ordinances, investigated the conditions of Indonesian pilgrims on their way to Kamaran and Mecca during the annual Hajj, was active in limiting an outbreak of bubonic plague in Malang, and began reforming and organizing the East Indies' Department of Public Health (Dienst der Volksgezondheid). He fought tenaciously against the press, People's Council, and other officials to avoid emphasising individual medical treatment in the colony, considering it far more expensive and less helpful than instituting better hygienic practices. He was inducted into the Imperial Japanese Order of the Sacred Treasure in 1920 and gave the keynote address to the 4th congress of the Far Eastern Association of Tropical Medicine in Batavia on 6 August 1921.

=== Retirement ===
De Vogel was tasked with travelling to Paris to serve as the Dutch East Indies' representative to the League of Nations' International Office of Public Hygiene in late 1925, a temporary post that became permanent enough that he retired from his other roles effective 1 January 1927. He was elevated to a commander and then a great officer in the Order of Orange–Nassau in 1933 and 1939 respectively. His wife predeceased him in early 1954. De Vogel himself died during the night of 9–10 March 1955 at the home of one of his sons in Hilversum in the Netherlands. He was succeeded by his four children Catharina Henriëtte van Lennep (18 August 1898 – 6 November 1979), Henri Adrien Frédéric (b. 28 February 1904), Mary Willemine Heeroma (b. 15 January 1909), and Willem (b. 21 September 1918). His papers are held by the University of Leiden.

== Works ==
- Bijdrage Tot de Kennis der Electrische Verschijnselen van het Hart [Contribution to Knowledge of the Electrical Phenomena of the Heart], Leiden: University of Leiden, 1893. (Dutch)
- De Taak van de Burgerlijke Geneeskundige Dienst in Nederlandsch Indië [The Task of the Civil Medical Service in the Dutch Indies], Amsterdam: Royal Institute for the Tropics, 1917. (Dutch)

== See also ==
- List of Dutch patrician families
