= Thomas Karsten =

Dutch architect

Herman Thomas Karsten (22 April 1884, Amsterdam – 1945, Cimahi) was a Dutch engineer who gave major contributions to architecture and town planning in Indonesia during Dutch colonial rule. Most significantly he integrated the practice of colonial urban environment with native elements; a radical approach to spatial planning for Indonesia at the time. He introduced a neighborhood plan for all ethnic groups in Semarang, built public markets in Yogyakarta and Surakarta, and a city square in the capital Batavia (now 'Jakarta'). In the book ‘Indische Bouwkunst’ about forty-five buildings designed by Karsten are mentioned. This book has been translated into Bahasa Indonesia and is available as a free download. Between 1915 and 1941 he was given responsibility for planning 12 out of 19 municipalities in Java, 3 out of 9 towns in Sumatra and a town in Kalimantan (Indonesian Borneo). He received official recognition from both the government through his appointment to the colony's major Town Planning Committee and by the academic community with his appointment to the position of Lecturer for Town Planning at the School of Engineering at Bandung. He died in an internment camp near Bandung in 1945 during the Japanese occupation of the Dutch East Indies.

== Biography ==
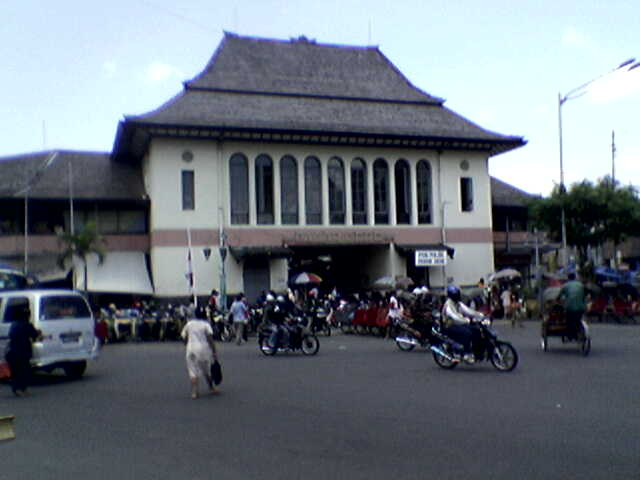
Pasar Gede Harjonagoro, a public market building at Surakarta designed by Karsten.

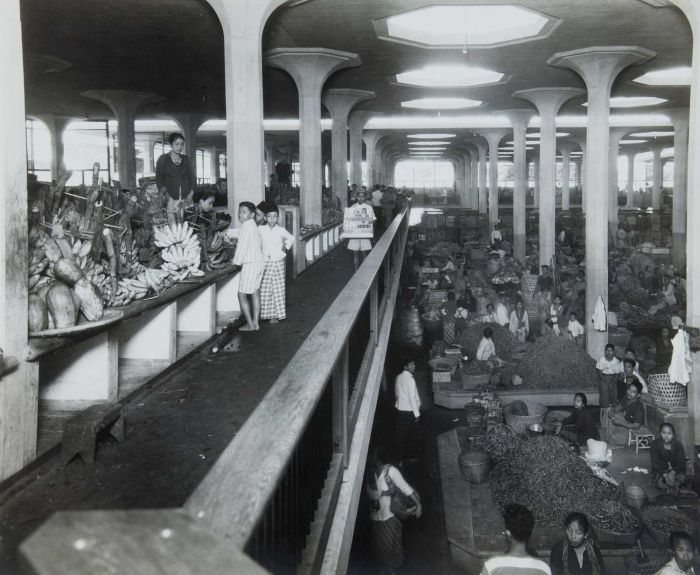
Interior of Pasar Johar in Semarang designed by Karsten.

Raised in a well-educated family, young Thomas Karsten developed progressive and liberal ideas. His father was a professor in philosophy and a university vice-chancellor, while his sister was the first woman in the Netherlands to study chemistry. Thomas Karsten enrolled at the Delft Polytechnische School (precursor of the Delft University of Technology) in the Netherlands and initially studied mechanical engineering, before changing to structural engineering following major institutional reforms to the school. Karsten was not among the leaders in his study, but he graduated from a faculty that had only produced between 3 and 10 graduates until 1920.

Karsten's hometown was Amsterdam and in the early 1920s, the city suffered major socio-economic problems. There was a highly segmented urban environment with extreme poverty, ethnic (particularly Jewish) segregation, and inequality. In 1908–1911, while Karsten was still a student, he was closely involved with the proponents of public housing reform in preparing a new housing project. Thomas Karsten's ideology towards social reform movements was developed during this time. He was a member of the Socialistische Technische Vereeniging, or Association of Socialist Engineers, and later he joined its sister organization in Java. He significantly contributed in a town planning report in the Netherlands, called Volkshuisvesting in de Nieuwe Stad te Amsterdam (1909) or 'Public Housing in the New City of Amsterdam'. Members of this project were socialist reformists, architects and feminists.

To escape World War I in Europe, he moved to the Dutch East Indies (present day of Indonesia), which he saw as a neutral and a far distance place from the war. He went to Java on the invitation of Henri Maclaine Pont, a former fellow student, to assist Pont's architecture firm. Never trained as a town planner, Karsten envisaged the Indies-architectural elements with a town planning approach from scratch. His social vision guided him to reject colonial town planning but to shape colonial urban environment by including native elements. In the 1920s he committed himself to the Dutch East Indies saying Java was his 'home' and that his growing antipathy towards 'Western civilization' helped him to articulate his work. He married a Javanese woman.

By 1918, he had defined a set of principles for his town planning which saw him engaged as a consultant for major cities in the colony. He was a town planning consultant for Semarang (1916–20, 1936), Buitenzorg (now 'Bogor') (1920–23), Madiun (1929), Malang (1930–35), Batavia (Jakarta) (1936–37), Magelang (1937–38), Bandung (1941), as well as Cirebon, Meester Cornelis (part of Jakarta which is known as Jatinegara), Yogyakarta, Surakarta, Purwokerto, Padang, Medan and Banjarmasin.

After long career working privately for municipal authorities, the government recognized Thomas Karsten by appointing him to official committees. First he was in the Bouwbeperkingscommissie (1930) ('Building Works Committee'), and later to the Stadsvormingscommissie (1934) ('Town Planning Committee'). In 1941, he was appointed to lecture at the School of Engineering at Bandung. During the Japanese occupation in Indonesia, Thomas Karsten was imprisoned at camp Baros in Cimahi near Bandung. He died at the camp in 1945.

His building projects included large two-storey homes with steeply pitched roofs for members for elite Dutch citizens, new palace pavilions that were both European and traditional Javanese for indigenous royalty, public market buildings in Yogyakarta and Surakarta, and grand headquarters for companies.

== Town planning ==
Several cities in Java and Sumatra underwent major renovation plans following the Dutch governments' early twentieth century introduction of the Ethical Policy. A new Decentralisation Act (Decentralitatiewet) was enacted in 1903 that enabled local municipalities and regional governments to develop and to plan their own territory. Most northern coastal towns of Java had to deal with unrelenting population increases, and a subsequent huge demand for houses and infrastructures, sanitation, and other related development. Thomas Karsten saw himself as being at the right time with the town planning of Semarang in 1914 by working at Henry Maclaine's architecture firm.

In colonialism, all social components are expressed through the articulation of the 'form of difference', and the colonial urban planning was precisely implemented by the order of relationship between various ethnically, racially and economically urban dwellers. Karsten rejected this idea and began to include more indigenous elements intertwined with those typical European elements. In 1917, he presented the 'New Candi' plan, an extension plan of the Semarang's master plan to accommodate all ethnic groups according to their own habits. He produced a master plan for new suburbs in Batavia including the central city square.

In 1921, Thomas Karsten presented a paper of the Indies Town Planning at the Decentralisation Congress. The paper was seen of a new radical idea in which Karsten argued that a town planning is an activity of interconnected components (social, technology, etc.) that is needed to be addressed harmoniously. His idea for a methodological approach to create an organic town plan with a social dimension received much acclaim in the colony, as well as in the Netherlands.

Karsten's paper gave major influence in the government plan for public housing. Among them were the municipal guidelines for urban extension and housing (1926), municipal priority rights on land (1926) and the provision of up to 50% of subsidies and guidelines for kampong (villages) improvement projects (1928). In 1930, Thomas Karsten together with other prominent architects, politicians and bureaucrats in the colony was appointed by the government to the Town Planning Committee. The committee produced a draft of Town Planning Ordinance in 1938 for the town planning regulations to organise buildings and construction in accordance with social and geographical characteristics and their expected growth. The plan was put on hold because of World War II and was never realized after which the Dutch lost their control over Indonesia.

== See also ==
- Indonesian architecture
- New Indies Style
