= Oei Hui-lan =

Chinese-Indonesian socialite (1889–1992)

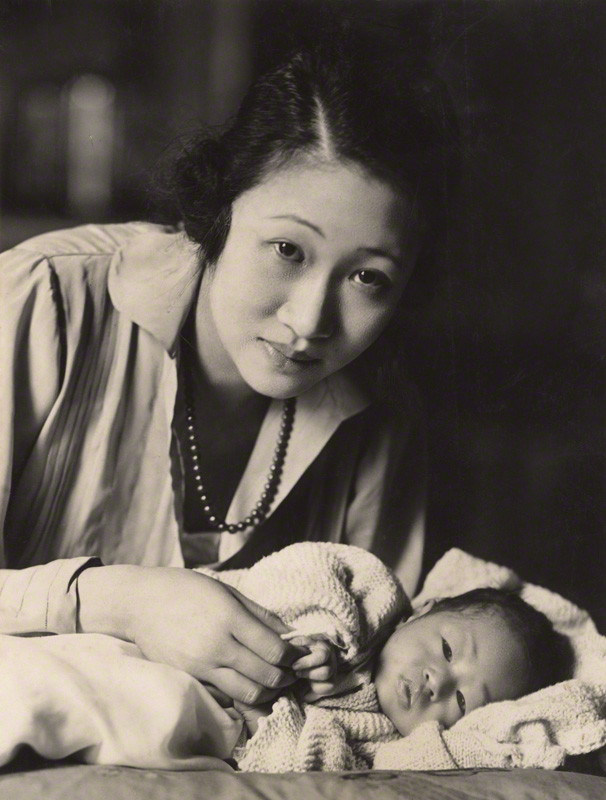
- Oei Hui-lan in 1922, with her son Yu-chang Wellington Koo Jr., photographed by Henry Walter Barnett

First Lady of the Republic of China
- In role 1 October 1926 – 16 June 1927
- President: Wellington Koo
- Preceded by: Yu Yishang

Personal details
- Born: 21 December 1889 Semarang, Central Java, Dutch East Indies
- Died: 1992 (aged 102–103) New York City, U.S.
- Citizenship: Indonesian; Chinese
- Party: Kuomintang
- Spouse(s): Beauchamp Forde Caulfield-Stoker (m. 1909; div. 1920) Wellington Koo (m. 1920; div. 1958)
- Children: 3
- Parent(s): Oei Tiong Ham (father); Goei Bing Nio (mother)

Chinese name
- Traditional Chinese: 黃蕙蘭
- Simplified Chinese: 黄蕙兰
Transcriptions
Standard Mandarin
- Hanyu Pinyin: Huáng Huìlán
- Wade–Giles: Huang^{2} Hui^{4}-lan^{2}
Southern Min
- Hokkien POJ: Ûiⁿ Hūi-lân

Oei Hui-lan (Chinese: 黃蕙蘭; Pe̍h-ōe-jī: Ûiⁿ Hūi-lân; 21 December 1889 – 1992), known as Madame Wellington Koo, was a Chinese-Indonesian international socialite and style icon, and from late 1926 until 1927, the First Lady of the Republic of China. She was married firstly to British consular agent Beauchamp Caulfield-Stoker, then to the pre-communist Chinese statesman Wellington Koo, and was a daughter and heiress of the colonial Indonesian tycoon Oei Tiong Ham, Majoor der Chinezen.

Both the parents of Oei Hui-lan hailed from the establishment: her father stemmed from one of the wealthiest families in Java, while her mother came from the 'Cabang Atas' aristocracy as a descendant of a Luitenant der Chinezen in Semarang's 18th-century Dutch bureaucracy. After an unsuccessful marriage with Caulfield-Stoker, she met Wellington Koo while in Paris in 1920. They married in Brussels the following year and first lived in Geneva in connection with the establishment of the League of Nations. In 1923, she moved with her husband to Beijing where he served as Acting Premier in the evolving republican Chinese state. During his second term (October 1926—June 1927), Wellington Koo also acted as President of the Republic of China for a brief period, making Oei Hui-lan the First Lady of China. The couple then spent time in Shanghai, Paris and London where Oei Hui-lan became a celebrated hostess. In 1941, she moved to New York where she died in 1992.

Oei Hui-lan, or Madame Koo as she became known, is also remembered for writing two autobiographies and for her contributions to fashion, especially her adaptations of traditional Chinese dress.

== Biography ==
=== Early life ===
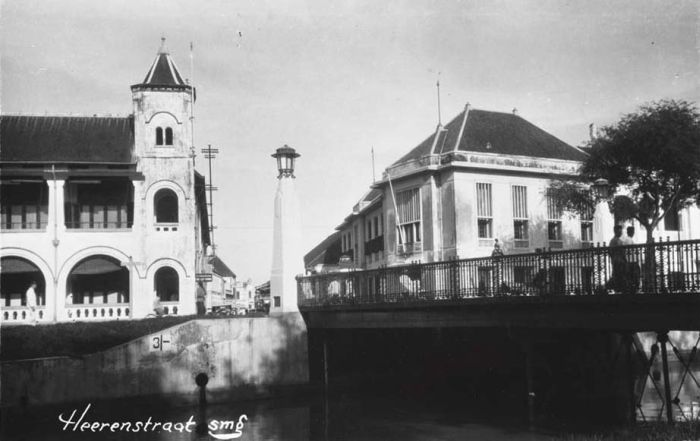
Colonial Semarang, where Madame Wellington Koo grew up

Oei Hui-lan was born on 21 December 1889 into a leading Peranakan Chinese family in Semarang, Central Java, then part of the Dutch East Indies, now Indonesia. Her father, the tycoon Majoor-titulair Oei Tiong Ham, headed Kian Gwan, a trading company founded by her grandfather Oei Tjie Sien in 1863 that became the largest conglomerate in Southeast Asia at the start of the twentieth century.

Her mother, Goei Bing-nio, was her father's senior wife and – unlike the nouveau riche Oei family – came from the Cabang Atas, the traditional Chinese establishment of colonial Indonesia. Through her mother, Hui-lan was descended from the merchant-mandarin Goei Poen Kong (1765–1806), who served as estate master or Boedelmeester, then Luitenant der Chinezen in Semarang in the late eighteenth century. The Chinese officership, consisting of the ranks of Majoor, Kapitein and Luitenant der Chinezen, was a civil government position in the Dutch colonial bureaucracy of Indonesia. Oei's maternal Goei family traces its roots and prominence in Semarang back to the 1770s. Goei Bing-nio's family had initially resisted Oei Tiong Ham's social and economic rise.

Hui-lan, who used the name Angèle in her youth, had an elder sister, Oei Tjong-lan, aka Gwendoline, from the same mother. In addition, her father had 18 junior wives and acknowledged concubines, as well as some 42 acknowledged children, including her half-brother Oei Tjong Hauw.

The two Oei sisters – as daughters of Oei's senior wife – lived with their father and were educated at home by a string of European tutors and governesses in Semarang, receiving a thoroughly modern upbringing by the standards of the times. This mirrored the westernization of the Cabang Atas in colonial Indonesia from the late nineteenth century onwards. In addition to her native Malay (Indonesian), Hui-lan acquired fluent English and French, and decent Hokkien, Mandarin and Dutch.

In 1905, Hui-lan and her sister were part of a recital in Singapore, where they were studying music. It was publicized in a local newspaper, as was a recital she gave in Semarang:

"The three cornered novelty of a young Chinese girl singing in French to an English audience in a Malay country next occupied the attention of the audience. This was “Farfalla” by Ms Angela [sic] H. Oei. Her effort captivated the audience, and but for the fact that encores were not allowed she would most certainly have been recalled. We have attended recitals great and strange in three capitals of Europe, but we must admit that this, the song of Miss Angela Oei staggered us. We repeat the novelty in a nutshell: a Chinese girl from Sumatra [sic!] singing a French classic in French to an English audience. Surely this is a world’s record! Is the East, after all, so far apart from the West?

"In March 1907 Angèle gave a vocal recital in Semarang, a soirée musicale, in the THHK school building in a fund-raiser for the school. She was accompanied by her sixteen-year-old niece, Lim Tshoen, from Singapore and her twelve-year-old nephew, Arthur Lim, on piano. Angèle performed pieces by French composers: Charles Gounod (”Siebel” in Faust) and Georges Bizet (from the opera Carmen) in elegant, fluent French.".

The progressive outlook and attainments of the Oei sisters received the admiration of R.A. Kartini, a Javanese aristocrat and pioneering women's rights activist. Despite their cosmopolitan background, the Oei sisters' contact with Javanese culture appears to have been restricted to interactions with servants, and being taken by their mother on courtesy visits and gamelan performances to various Javanese royal courts.

=== Marriage to Beauchamp Caulfield-Stoker (1909–1920) ===
In 1909, in Semarang, Indonesia, Hui-lan (using the surname Oeitiongham) married Beauchamp Forde Gordon Caulfield-Stoker (1877–1949), an Anglo-Irishman who was the British consular agent in Semarang, and eventually represented his father-in-law's sugar interests in London. The following year they moved to England, where they lived first at 33 Lytton Grove and then at Graylands, Augustus Road, Wimbledon Common, which had been purchased for them by her father in 1915. The couple had one son, Lionel Montgomery Caulfield-Stoker (1912–1954), and divorced in London on 19 April 1920. Hui-lan then lived with her mother and sister at their townhouse in Mayfair, London. This period of her life—when she was known in the society pages as Countess Hoey [an Anglicization of Oei] Stoker (presumably because her father had been called a count by some) and preferred to be called Lady Stoker—she omitted from her memoirs.

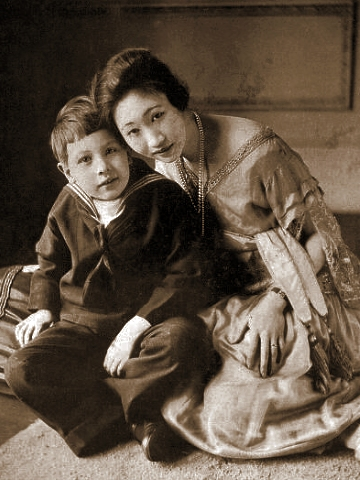
Oei Hui-lan, then Mrs Beauchamp Caulfield-Stoker, a.k.a. Countess Hoey Stoker, and her eldest son, Lionel Montgomery Caulfield-Stoker, in 1920

It had not been an easy marriage, with published reports indicating that Hui-lan's personality, pretensions, and social ambitions had driven her husband to distraction, to the point that by World War I they had become incompatible. The Sketch noted that "Countess Hoey Stoker is one of the best-known figures in London Society. She is the daughter of...the 'Rockefeller of China'." The society magazine Tatler described her as having "a fondness for aviation and [being] among the first ladies to indulge in civilian flying", while The Times noted that "no dance or other function was complete without [her]...a famous beauty who drove her own motor car about London…a little grey two-seater Rolls Royce that could often be seen threading rapidly through traffic." Margaret Macdonald observed Hui-lan, dressed as a Chinese ("which in reality she is"), at a costume party at The Ritz, also attended by Lady Diana Manners, the Duchess of Sutherland and Margot Asquith. Hui-lan reveled in the dancing and fashion opportunities provided by London high society. She also reveled in avant-garde fashion: "I was allowed to wear my favorite dinner dress, an amazing creation with full Turkish trousers made of green chiffon, a gold lame bodice and a brief yellow jacket. I tucked gold and green flowers in my hair and wore a triple strand of pearls". It was, she later remarked, "the brink of the flapper era and I fitted in like a charm. I had the figure for it, tiny and small bosomed, and the vitality. If you can imagine a Chinese flapper, it was I."

In 1915, Stoker took a commission in the Royal Army Service Corps and endeavored to keep Hui-lan at a distance, retreating to a separate bedroom when at home and rebuffing her desire to join him in Devonport, where he was posted: "It is quite ridiculous for you to come down here as you could not stick it for more than two or three days. In fact, if you came I should have to apply for leave as I could not possibly stop here". Their "lives and ideas were so far apart that it makes it impossible for [me to return home]". Hui-lan filed for divorce in 1919, claiming that her husband had refused to introduce her to his family and on grounds of cruelty and misconduct. The Birmingham Daily Gazette noted that the couple's marital travails bore a resemblance to the plot of Joseph Hergesheimer's "striking novel" Java Head, a 1918 best-seller, in which, the paper stated, "the theme of which was the bringing home by an American of a Chinese wife of noble family, and their gradual alienation because of the lack of communion between the two".

=== Marriage to Wellington Koo (1920–1958) ===
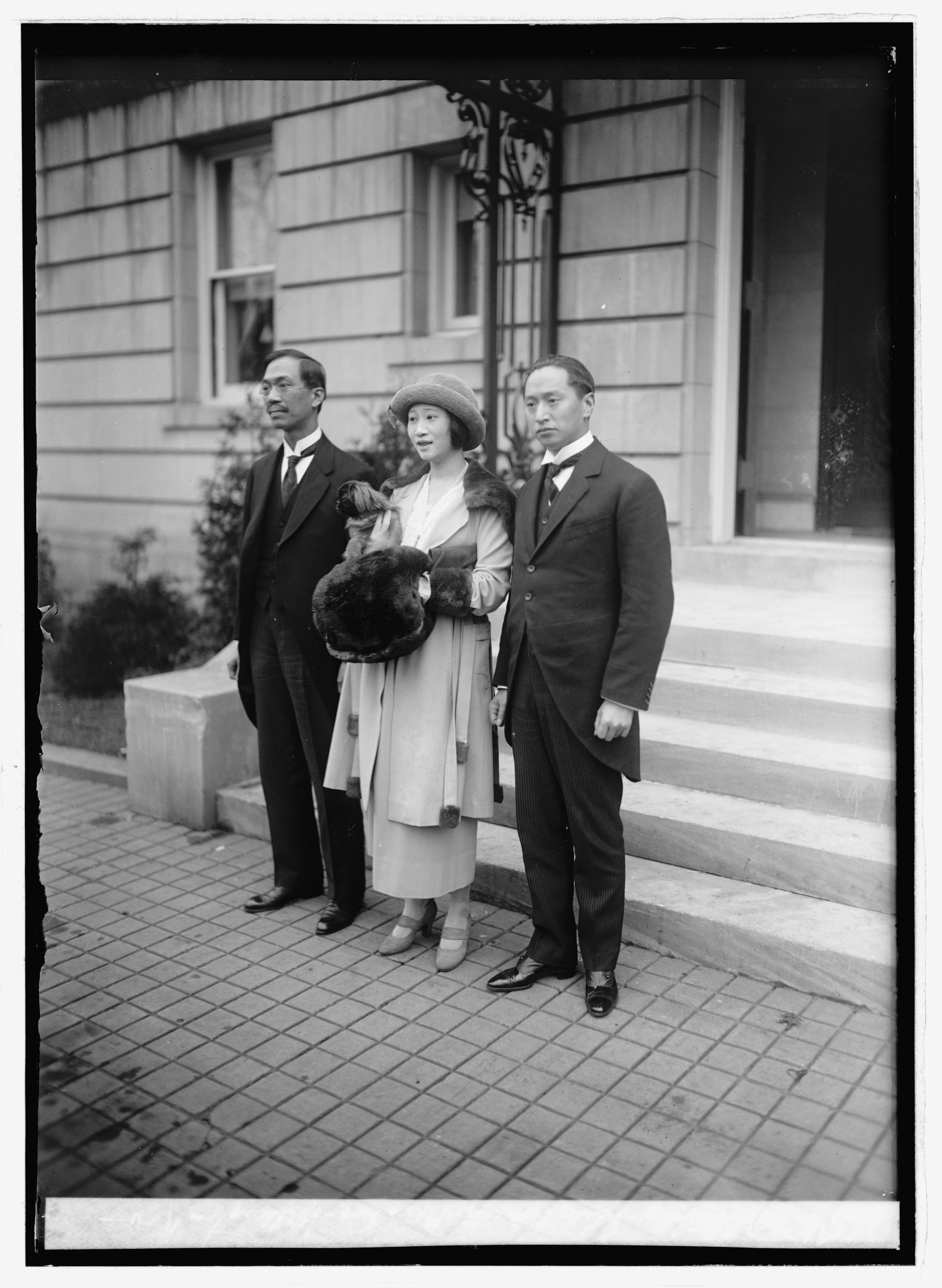
From left: Wang Chonghui, Oei Hui-lan and her husband Wellington Koo, between 1921 and 1924.

Hui-lan's mother encouraged her daughter, now divorced, to make the acquaintance of the promising, Columbia-educated Chinese diplomat and politician V. K. Wellington Koo, himself a divorcé and a recent widower with two small children. Through machinations by Hui-lan's mother and sister and others—the parents of Koo's late wife, May Tang, among them—the heiress and the politician met in Paris at a dinner party in August 1920. They announced their engagement on 10 October, during a ball in honor of the anniversary of the Chinese Republic, and were married at the Chinese Legation in Brussels, Belgium, on 9 November. The bride wore an antique veil and an ivory gown by Callot Soeurs. Later that year, for a State Ball at Buckingham Palace, the new Madame Wellington Koo wore a dress by Charles Frederick Worth and a Cartier diamond tiara.

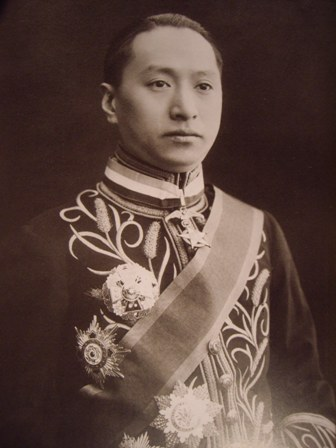
Chinese statesman V. K. Wellington Koo in court uniform

The couple began their married life in Geneva, where Koo had been involved in the formation of the League of Nations. Hui-lan followed her husband in 1923 to Beijing, where she supported him in his role as Foreign Minister and Finance Minister of the Republic of China. Her father, Majoor Oei Tiong Ham, acquired in 1923 a Ming palace compound for the Koos, in his daughter's name, that had been constructed in the 17th century for the courtesan Chen Yuanyuan, mistress of General Wu Sangui. In 1924, Madame Koo returned to her native Semarang for the funeral of her father, who had recently died in Singapore; she acted as mourner-in-chief, representing her absent mother as senior wife. In 1925, the Koos hosted the Chinese elder statesman Sun Yat-sen and his wife, Soong Ching-ling, for a long stay at their Beijing residence, where Sun later died.

During Hui-lan's time in China, the country was undergoing a very turbulent period in its political history – the so-called warlord era, in which different military and political factions sought supremacy in the new, republican Chinese state. Wellington Koo served twice as Acting Premier, first in 1924, then again from 1 October 1926 until 16 June 1927. During his second term, Koo also acted as President of the Republic of China, which made Hui-lan – for a very brief period – First Lady of China.

With Koo out of office in 1927, the couple settled down in Shanghai, then the fourth-largest port city in the world. Hui-lan's social circle in Shanghai included the businessman Sir Victor Sassoon and Wallis Warfield Simpson, later Duchess of Windsor. Hui-lan recalls in her memoirs that Wallis's only phrase in Mandarin was "boy, pass me the champagne".

Hui-lan, however, found Shanghai in the 1920s wanting, and thought it "filled with...British shipping people...nobodies at home...[who] put on upper-class airs in China...they were so insular, so middle-class...and looked down their noses at everything really beautiful and indigenous to...[Chinese] culture: jade, porcelain, antiques. And the poor foolish Shanghai Chinese were so impressed with these upstarts that they copied their manners and filled their houses with 'Western' furniture (the so-called smart Shanghai furniture all came from Grand Rapids and was heavy and ugly)." In contrast, she was enamoured of pre-communist Beijing, whose classical order and ancient beauty she thought was comparable only to Paris. In later life, she exclaimed: "Peking is my city, where I once belonged and where I hope someday, if things ever change in my lifetime, to return."

=== Ambassadress and World War II ===
The Koos subsequently relocated to Paris in 1932, where Wellington Koo had been appointed Chinese Ambassador to France, a post he kept until 1940. Following the fall of France to Germany during the Second World War, Koo served as Chinese Ambassador to the United Kingdom in London until 1946. Koo represented the Republic of China in 1945 as one of the founding members of the United Nations.

All through this time, Madame Wellington Koo was a celebrated society hostess in Paris and London. The substantial inheritance from Hui-lan's father provided the couple with the financial resources to entertain the European social elite in Paris and London. Their expenditure on diplomatic hospitality frequently exceeded the standard means of contemporary diplomatic officials. In the summer of 1939, she attended Elsie de Wolfe's party for the Maharani of Kapurthala at Villa Trianon in Versailles with a guest list that included Coco Chanel and Elsa Schiaparelli; some considered it Europe's last swan song before the Second World War.

She also oversaw the education of her two sons by Koo, Yu-chang Wellington Koo Jr. (1922–1975) and Fu-chang Freeman Koo (1923–1977), who attended MacJannet School in Paris, where they were contemporaries of Prince Philip of Greece and Denmark, later husband of Queen Elizabeth II. Her eldest son, Lionel Caulfield-Stoker, lived in England with his father and stepmother, Nora.

=== Later life ===
In 1941, Oei moved to New York City, where her sons Wellington Koo Jr. and Freeman Koo were educated at their father's alma mater, Columbia University. Her aim was to use her international connections to persuade the United States to join the war on the Allied side to help China's war effort in Asia. Although the Koos were later reunited in New York, the war years and separation had taken their toll; and the couple divorced in 1958. She spent the remainder of her life in New York City.

She authored two autobiographies in collaboration, first in 1943 with the society columnist for The Washington Post Mary Van Rensselaer Thayer, then in 1975 with the journalist Isabella Taves. In the 1980s, she was involved in a series of unsuccessful business ventures in her native Indonesia, including shipping, tobacco, and bicycles.

By the time she died in 1992, she had survived her former husband and both their sons. The business empire her grandfather and father built had been broken up by Sukarno following the Indonesian Revolution; and the Republic of China which she and her husband served for many decades had lost mainland China to the Communist Party.

== Style, art and legacy ==
Madame Koo was much admired for her adaptations of traditional Chinese dress, which she wore with lace trousers and jade necklaces. She is widely acknowledged for reinventing the Chinese cheongsam in a way that accentuates and flatters the female figure. Cheongsam dresses at the time were decorously slit a few inches up the sides, but Hui-lan slashed hers to the knee – in the heady 1920s – "with lace pantelettes just visible to the ankle". She thereby helped modernize, glamorize and popularize what soon became the Chinese female national dress. Unlike other Asian socialites, Madame Wellington Koo insisted on using local silks and materials, which she thought were of superior quality.

She was featured several times by Vogue Magazine on its list of best-dressed women in the 1920s, 1930s and 1940s. Vogue saluted Madame Koo in 1942 as "a Chinese citizen of the world, an international beauty", for her enlightened approach to promoting goodwill between East and West.

Madame Wellington Koo sat for portraits by Federico Beltrán Masses, Edmund Dulac, Leon Underwood, Olive Snell, Olive Pell, and Charles Tharp, and had her photographs taken by the fashion and society photographers Henry Walter Barnett, E. O. Hoppé, Horst P. Horst, Bassano, and George Hoyningen-Huene.

Her portraits, photographs and dresses are today part of the collections of the National Portrait Gallery in London, the Metropolitan Museum of Art in New York, and the Peranakan Museum in Singapore.

== In contemporary culture ==
Madame Koo's fashion legacy continues to attract attention internationally. She was featured as a "woman of style" at China: Through the Looking Glass, an art exhibition curated by Andrew Bolton and Harold Koda, and held to great acclaim in 2015 at the Metropolitan Museum of Art. In 2018, the Indonesian designer Toton Januar created a video campaign for his Fall Winter collection, based on a reimagining of one of Madame Koo's portraits.

In her native Indonesia, Madame Koo has been the subject of a string of recent publications. Under the pen name Agnes Davonar, popular writers Agnes Li and Teddy Li authored a sentimental and sensationalist biography of Madame Koo, Kisah tragis Oei Hui Lan, putri orang terkaya di Indonesia (The Tragic Story of Oei Hui Lan, Daughter of Indonesia's Richest Man), published in 2009 by AD Publisher. Oei Hui Lan: anak orang terkaya dari Semarang (Oei Hui lan: Daughter of Semarang's Richest Man), another popular biography, was published by Eidelweis Mahameru in 2011. That same year, Mahameru published a popular biography of Madame Koo's father, Oei Tiong Ham: Raja Gula, Orang Terkaya dari Semarang (Oei Tiong Ham: Sugar King, Semarang's Richest Man).

== Ancestry ==
Ancestors of Oei Hui-lan

8. Oei Tjhing In
4. Oei Tjie Sien (1835–1909)
9. Tjan Moay Nio
2. Oei Tiong Ham, Majoor-titulair der Chinezen (1866–1924)
5. Tjan Bien Nio
1. Oei Hui-lan
24. Goei Ping Jauw Sia
12. Goei King San Sia
25. Nj. Goei Ping Jauw Sia
6. Goei Yam Tjhiang Sia
13. Nj. Goei King San Sia
3. Goei Bing-nio
7. Nj. Goei Yam Tjhiang Sia

== List of works ==
- Hui-lan Koo (Madame Wellington Koo): An Autobiography as Told to Mary Van Rensselaer Thayer New York: Dial Press (1943)
- No Feast Lasts Forever New York: Times Books (1975)

== See also ==
- Cabang Atas: her social class in colonial Indonesia
- History of the Republic of China
- Politics of the Republic of China
- First Lady of the Republic of China
- Nellie Yu Roung Ling – first Chinese modern dancer and fashion designer
