= Oei Tiong Ham =

Indonesian businessman (1866–1924)

Majoor-titulair der Chinezen Oei Tiong Ham
- 黃仲涵
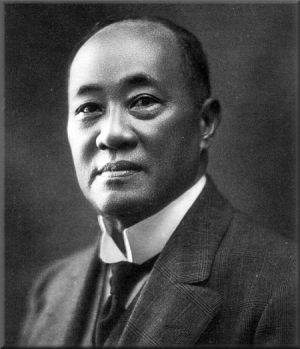
- Born: 19 November 1866; Semarang, Dutch East Indies
- Died: 6 June 1924 (aged 57); Singapore, Straits Settlements
- Occupation: Businessman
- Spouse(s): Goei Bing-nio (魏明娘)
- Children: Oei Tjong Hauw (son); Madame Wellington Koo (daughter)
- Parent(s): Oei Tjie Sien (father); Tjan Bien Nio (mother)
- Relatives: V. K. Wellington Koo (son-in-law)

Chinese name
- Traditional Chinese: 黃仲涵
- Simplified Chinese: 黄仲涵
- Hanyu Pinyin: Huáng Zhònghán
- Hokkien POJ: Ûiⁿ Tiōng-hâm

Oei Tiong Ham (Chinese: 黃仲涵; Pe̍h-ōe-jī: Ûiⁿ Tiōng-hâm; pinyin: Huáng Zhònghán; 1866–1924) was a Chinese Indonesian tycoon and the son of Oei Tjie Sien, the founder of the Kian Gwan, a multinational trading company. Born in Semarang, Central Java, Dutch East Indies (now Indonesia), he became the wealthiest person in Asia at the start of the twentieth century. Part of his wealth originated in his involvement in the sugar industry. He served as Luitenant der Chinezen in the Dutch colonial administration in Semarang, and was raised to the rank of titular Majoor upon retirement.

In Singapore, where Oei relocated to avoid Dutch inheritance law in his succession planning, a road is named after him. Oei Tiong Ham Park, near Holland Road, is also named in his honor. His nickname, "Man of 200 Million", originates from the passing of his 200 million guilder estate at the time of his death in 1924 in Singapore.

== Early life ==
Oei Tiong Ham was born in Semarang on 19 November 1866. His father, Oei Tjie Sien, was a Chinese-born, or totok, migrant and a self-made, 'new money' businessman with no kinship ties to the colonial Chinese establishment (the 'Cabang Atas'). Oei's mother, Tjan Bien Nio, was an Indies-born woman from a middle-class Peranakan Chinese family.

Oei's significance relates to his role in expanding his father's trading house, Kian Gwan, into the Oei Tiong Ham Concern (OTHC), the largest conglomerate in Southeast Asia at the beginning of the twentieth century.

== Career ==
The OTHC originally started with the trading firm of Kian Gwan, established in 1863 by Oei's father.

In 1893, Oei took over the firm Kian Gwan from his father, and incorporated it as Handel Maatschappij Kian Gwan. Under Oei, the company diversified and grew into one of the largest firms in Southeast Asia. At the time Oei took over the firm, Kian Gwan's main activity was trade, especially trade in rubber, kapok, gambir, tapioca and coffee. In addition, it was involved with pawnshops, postal services, logging and the highly lucrative opium trade. It has been estimated that between 1890 and 1904, Kian Gwan made a profit of some 18 million guilders in the opium trade alone, which provided the basis for his empire.

=== Rise ===
Oei's initial strategy was gradually to build up dominance in the highly lucrative opium market towards the end of the nineteenth century. This feat was all the more remarkable given the virtual control of the opium monopoly by more established, older concerns with close ties to the Cabang Atas. The bankruptcy of one of these older concerns in 1889 prompted the colonial government to host an auction to select new opium farmers.

This auction has gone down as one of the most competitive in history, described by the poet Boen Sing Hoo in his Boekoe Sair Binatang ("On Animals", published in 1895) as a real "peperangan diantara raja-raja" ("battle of kings"). It gave the young Oei and Kian Gwan an opportunity to establish themselves as a significant player. Boen's poem describes how the parvenu Oei, whom he calls Anak Sapi (the "Young Ox"), managed to outbid the established Batavia partnership led by Kapitein Loa Tiang Hoei (Boen's Boeaja Emas or "Gold Crocodile") and Kapitein Oey Hok Tjiang.

=== A conglomerate ===
Having gained control over the opium market of central Java, Kian Gwan went on to corner the sugar market. Unlike many of his Chinese contemporaries, Oei relied heavily on written contracts in conducting his business. This did not make him popular in Chinese circles but it provided him with a legal basis to acquire the collateral for the loans he extended. Among his main debtors were often owners of sugar factories in East Java. When these factories were unable to repay the loans due to the long-lasting effects of the sugar crisis of the 1880s, he used his rights as a creditor. In this way, he acquired five sugar factories. Sugar now became the backbone of the company and would remain so for the next several decades.

Kian Gwan gradually integrated its plantations, mills, shipping lines, banks and complementary enterprises. This fully integrated chain, as James R. Rush points out, differs from the earlier opium empires and older Chinese concerns, for Oei's main competitors were not other Chinese, but the large European trading companies. Oei's company was also groundbreaking in employing professional personnel, instead of relying completely on family members in the old Chinese way. Only ownership of Kian Gwan rested with the family.

In the period between the 1890s and the 1920s, the OTHC grew and diversified rapidly. It started branches in London, Amsterdam, Singapore, Bangkok and New York, created a bank, a steamship business and had a large wholesale business. Of all the ethnic Chinese business conglomerates in pre-war Asia, the OTHC was by far the largest. The company was even larger than the well-known "Big Five" Dutch trading companies that supposedly dominated the foreign trade of the Indies. The OTHC was strong in foreign trade, particularly in China. The basic strategy of the company was to take advantage of the opportunities on the world market for commodities produced in Indonesia.

In 1912, Kian Gwan, the trading branch of the conglomerate was capitalised at fifteen million guilders, double the amount of the largest Dutch firm Internatio.

During the post-war boom of 1918-1920, the worldwide demand for Java sugar was high, creating many opportunities for sugar-mill owners and sugar brokers, but fortunes gained were easily lost in a couple of days. Oei followed a cautious policy during these boom years. He did not speculate too heavily and took steps to improve its financial administration. Oei recruited talented accountants to set up a modern accounting system for the sugar factories. Due to the cautious and independent strategy, the company survived the subsequent sugar crisis while many other Chinese firms perished.

Besides making use of written agreements and a modern accounting system, Oei also diverted from yet another Chinese business practice of the time. Instead of relying solely on family members in running his wide ranging business enterprises, he deliberately chose capable outsiders, such as Dutch directors, managers, and engineers to manage his companies.

=== Singapore ===
In 1912, Oei bought The Heap Eng Moh Steamship Company Limited, known as the "Red Funnel" Line. One of the employees in Singapore is Lee Hoon Leong, grandfather of the first Prime Minister of Singapore Lee Kuan Yew. Oei also had controlling interests in the Semarang Steamship Navigation Company.

In 1920, Oei left Semarang and settled in Singapore to escape Dutch colonial succession law and tax regime. Having eight wives and twenty-six official children, inheritance became important issues. He decided to hand his daughters and some of his sons cash, and make eight of his sons his rightful heirs, dividing among them an inheritance worth two hundred million guilders. Since only two of them, Oei Tjong Swan and Oei Tjong Hauw, had reached maturity, immediate succession did not seem to give too many problems.

In 1961, the Indonesian OTHC came to an end, when the Indonesian government's Pengadilan Ekonomi (the court for economic crimes) seized and nationalised all of OTHC's Indonesian assets including its strategic sugar plantations and factories.

In 1964, the government formed a holding company named PT Rajawali Nusantara Indonesia to run them, which is still a prominent corporation up to this day. However, many of the Kian Gwan offices abroad managed to survive and became independent companies on its own, each operated by one of Oei's sons.

== Death ==
In 1924, Oei died in Singapore. His body was returned to Semarang.

Oei Hui-lan (later Madame Wellington Koo due to her marriage to V.K. Wellington Koo), Oei's second daughter from his first wife, believed that her father was poisoned to death by Lucy Ho, his mistress at the time of death. Oei's body was shipped to Semarang for burial in his father's tomb.

== Personal life ==
According to No Feast Lasts Forever, the autobiography of Oei Tiong Ham's daughter Oei Hui-lan (who married V.K. Wellington Koo), Goei Bing Nio (Chinese: 魏明娘; pinyin: Wèi Míngniáng) was selected by Oei Tiong Ham's mother to be his wife and was married to him at the age of 15. She had two daughters with him, Tjong-lan and Hui-lan. Oei Tiong Ham also had 18 acknowledged concubines.

One of Goei Bing-nio's sisters was unable to have children so she adopted two girls from her husband's brother. These girls both became Oei Tiong Ham's concubines. The younger of the two sisters, Lucy Ho (or Hoo Kiem Hoa), moved to Singapore with Oei Tiong Ham and lived with him until his death. One of Oei Tiong Ham's sons with Lucy Ho later married Oei Tiong Ham's granddaughter (the daughter of Oei Tjong-swan, one of Oei Tiong Ham's sons not born to Lucy Ho).

Oei Tiong Ham Park, a road in Singapore’s Bukit Timah District, is named after him.

== Family ==
Wife	Daughter	Sons
Goei Bing Nio	Oei Tjong-lan (Madame Kan Teng Liang); Oei Hui-lan (better known as Madame Wellington Koo).	-
The Khiam Nio	Oei Djoe Nio	-
The Tjik Nio	Oei Hwan Nio; Oei Oen Nio; Oei Liang Nio; Oei Siok Kiong Nio	Oei Tjong Tee (m. Lauw Im-Nio); Oei Tjong Swan; Oei Tjong Yoe (m. Fientje Dunk); Oei Tjong Tiong (m. Lim Chit-Geck); Oei Tjong Liam (m. Lie Pian-Nio)
Ong Tjiang Tjoe Nio	Oei Sioe Kiong Nio; Oei Bien Nio (Mrs. Yeap Hock-Hoe)	-
Ong Mie Hoa Nio	Oei Swat Nio	Oei Tjong Hauw (m. Bhe Hien-Nio); Oei Tjong Tjiat (m. Berdina Van Betuwe); Oei Tjong Yan; Oei Tjong Ik (m. Leonie Antoinette Livain)
Njoo Swat Ting Nio	Oei Siok Ing Nio	-
Ho Kiem Hoa Nio (alias Lucy Ho); moved to Singapore with Oei. She lived with him until his death.	Oei Twan Nio	Oei Tjong Ie (m. Maria Suzanna Mathysen) Oei Tjong Bo; Oei Tjong Hiong; Oei Tjong Tjay (m. Mariamme Lisette Blanc)
Tan Sien Nio	Oei Siang Nio	-
