= Oei Tjie Sien =

Chinese-born Indonesian tycoon (1835–1900)

- Born: 1835; Fujian, Qing dynasty
- Died: 1900 (aged 64–65); Semarang, Dutch East Indies
- Occupations: Military rebel, businessman, landlord and revenue farmer
- Spouse: Tjan Bien Nio
- Children: Majoor-titulair Oei Tiong Ham (son); Majoor-titulair Oei Tiong Bing (son); Oei Tiong Tjhian (son); Luitenant Oei Tiong An (son); Oei Siok Nio (daughter); Oei Bok Nio (daughter); Oei Thiem Nio (daughter); Oei Koen Nio (daughter)
- Parent(s): Oei Tjhing In (father); Tjan Moay Nio (mother)
- Relatives: Madame Wellington Koo (granddaughter); V. K. Wellington Koo (grandson-in-law); Oei Tjong Hauw (grandson); Oei Tjong Tjay (grandson); Madame Teng Liang Kan (granddaughter)

Oei Tjie Sien (Chinese: 黃志信; pinyin: Huáng Zhìxìn; Pe̍h-ōe-jī: Ûiⁿ Chì-sìn; 1835–1900) was a Chinese-born colonial Indonesian tycoon and the founder of Kian Gwan, Southeast Asia's largest conglomerate at the start of the twentieth century. He is better known as the father of Oei Tiong Ham, Majoor-titulair der Chinezen (1866–1924), who modernized and vastly expanded the Oei family's business empire.

== Biography ==
=== Early life ===
Born on June 23, 1835, into a family of modest means in Tong'an, Tjoan-tjioe, (Quanzhou) Fujian, a southern province of Imperial China, Oei Tjie Sien was the sixth son of Oei Tjhing In. According to family tradition, the elder Oei was a petty government official, but the colonial Indonesian historian Liem Thian Joe suggested that the family was of peasant origin.

Regardless, his father ensured that the younger Oei received a classical Chinese education. This could have given Oei Tjie Sien a respectable career as a teacher or minor bureaucrat; but he participated instead in the Taiping Rebellion (1850-1864) against the then reigning Qing dynasty. During the rebellion, he rose up the ranks and was put in charge of logistics.

=== Life and career in colonial Indonesia ===
Avoiding the Qing government's suppression of the rebels, Oei left his first wife in China and fled in 1858 to Semarang, Central Java in the Dutch East Indies or today's Indonesia. Aged only 23, Oei's Indonesian career began as a door-to-door peddler of diverse goods, from chinaware to rice. Once financially independent, Oei married a locally-born Peranakan woman, Tjan Bien Nio (1839-1896), who came from a middle-class merchant family. Together, the couple slowly built their business and had, among others, three sons: Oei Tiong Ham, Oei Tiong Bing and Oei Tiong Tjhian. They also had four daughters: Siok Nio, Bok Nio, Thiem Nio and Koen Nio. By a concubine, Oei also had a fourth son, Oei Tiong An. Oei sent his sons to a traditional Chinese school, where they mostly learned the Chinese classics and some rudimentary arithmetics.

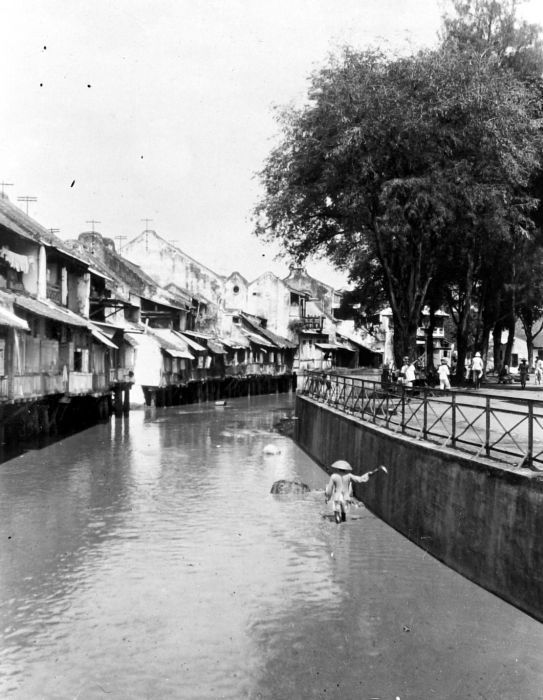
The Chinese quarter in colonial Semarang.

By 1863, Oei and his business partner, Ang Thay Liang, had accumulated enough capital to establish a kongsi or business partnership, named 'Kian Gwan', which was then registered with the colonial authorities. The new company dealt in both Chinese products, such as tea, herbs and silk, as well as in Indonesian commodities, including rice, sugar, tobacco and gambier. Kian Gwan prospered in the economic boom that followed the Agrarian Law of 1870, which opened up agricultural land in Java to private capital.

Oei's newfound wealth secured him an official pardon from the Qing government in 1874, and the prestige of landownership in 1878 through his acquisition of the particuliere landerij or private domain of Simongan, an estate of 1,300 hectares outside Semarang. As landheer or landlord of Simongan, Oei - unlike his Jewish predecessor - allowed access free of charge to the venerable Chinese shrine of Sam Poo Kong, located on the estate. The new landlord's generosity endeared him to the local Chinese community. Oei also obtained the Dutch colonial government's permission in 1880 to move from Semarang's Chinese quarter to Simongan, where - away from business - he lived the more prestigious lifestyle of a landlord and scholar, laying out a garden and his family graveyard, and eventually in retirement, tending to his lotuses. Despite their wealth, noted Howard Dick, Oei's family was still 'one step removed from the peranakan aristocracy (cabang atas)'.

In 1884, Oei arranged for his eldest son and chosen successor, Oei Tiong Ham, to marry Goei Bing-nio, the fourth daughter of a Cabang Atas family that had been prominent in Semarang for over a century. The younger Oei sealed his family's social ascent with a hallowed appointment in 1886 to the government position of Luitenant der Chinezen. This high-ranking post of the Chinese officership gave Oei not only the deference of the Chinese community, but also significant legal and political jurisdiction over them under the Dutch colonial system of indirect rule.

By the mid-1880s, the elder Oei seems to have given his eldest son a prominent role in Kian Gwan and the family's other business interests. The collapse in sugar prices in the mid-1880s ruined many established Cabang Atas families, thereby jeopardizing their domination of Java's revenue farms, in particular the lucrative opium farms. The parvenu Oeis, father and son, were ready to capitalize on the economic crisis and took over many revenue farms from ruined Cabang Atas families. In 1889, with Oei Tjie Sien as guarantor, his son Luitenant Oei Tiong Ham participated in one of the most important government auctions of the century - for the opium farms of Semarang, Surakarta, Yogyakarta, Madiun and Kedu, formerly belonging to a rival kongsi, headed by Luitenant Ho Tjiauw Ing. The poet Boen Sing Hoo in his Boekoe Sair Binatang calls the auction of 1889 a 'peperangan diantara raja-raja' ('a battle of kings'). Oei's son - dubbed 'Anak Sapi' (the 'Young Ox') by Boen - won the auction after a fierce bidding war against a Batavia-based kongsi, headed by Kapitein Loa Tiang Hoei and Kapitein Oey Hok Tjiang, doyens of the colonial Chinese establishment.

In 1893, with his family on the rise, Oei Tjie Sien retired to his lotuses at Simongan, where he died was buried in 1900 at the age of 65.

=== Legacy and descendants ===
All four of Oei's daughters married into Cabang Atas families. Likewise, apart from Oei Tiong Tjhian who died young, all three of Oei's sons were elevated to the Chinese officership. His eldest, Luitenant Oei Tiong Ham, was further raised to the post of Kapitein der Chinezen in 1891, then to the honorary title of Majoor-titulair der Chinezen in 1901, the highest rank attainable to a Chinese subject in the Dutch East Indies. The elder Oei's second son, Oei Tiong Bing, was appointed a Luitenant in 1892, then a Kapitein in 1901; in 1903, he became the Majoor der Chinezen of Semarang, head of the city's colonial Chinese bureaucracy. The two Majoors' half-brother, Oei Tiong An, was appointed to the post of Luitenant der Chinezen of Salatiga, Central Java in 1925, a post he held until the abolition of the Chinese officership in 1935.

Oei Tjie Sien's grandsons, Oei Tjong Hauw and Oei Tjong Tjay, eventually succeeded their grandfather and father, as heads of Kian Gwan from 1924 until 1961, and played an important role in the political and economic history of modern Indonesia and Southeast Asia. Oei Tjie Sien's granddaughter, the international socialite Oei Hui-lan, married the pre-communist Chinese statesman and diplomat V. K. Wellington Koo, and briefly acted as First Lady of the Republic of China.

Kian Gwan, the company founded by Oei Tjie Sien, became the largest conglomerate in Southeast Asia in the early decades of the twentieth century, and retained that position until the nationalization of its Indonesian arm in 1961 by Indonesian President Sukarno's left-leaning government. The company's Indonesian branch survives as Rajawali Nusantara Indonesia, one of Indonesia's largest state-owned enterprises; Kian Gwan's branches in The Netherlands, and Thailand survive to this day on a more modest scale.
