= Pan Fu =

Chinese politician

- 潘復
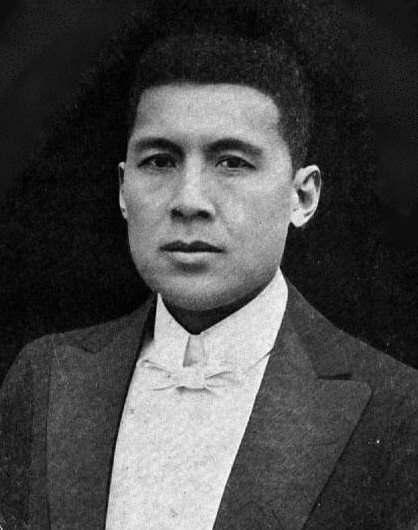
- Pan Fu c.1920s

Premier of China
- In office 18 June 1927 – 4 June 1928
- President: Zhang Zuolin
- Preceded by: Wellington Koo (acting)
- Succeeded by: Tan Yankai

Minister of Finance
- In office 1 October 1926 – 12 January 1927
- Premier: Wellington Koo (acting)
- Preceded by: Wellington Koo
- Succeeded by: Tang Erho
- In office 24 July 1920 – 11 August 1920; Acting
- Premier: Sa Zhenbing (acting); Jin Yunpeng
- Preceded by: Li Shih-hou
- Succeeded by: Chow Tsu-chi

Personal details
- Born: 22 November 1883 Jining, Shandong, Qing China
- Died: 12 September 1936 (aged 52) Beijing, China

Pan Fu (Chinese: 潘復; pinyin: Pān Fù) (22 November 1883 – 12 September 1936) was a Chinese politician and premier of the China from 1927 to 1928 during the Beiyang government. He was the acting Minister of Finance from 24 July 1920 to 11 August 1920, and again from 11 June 1921 to 28 October 1921 when he stood in for Li Shiwei. He was finance minister in his own right from 1 October 1926 to 12 January 1927. Fu became premier and minister for transportation on 12 January 1927 and served until 3 June 1928.

== See also ==
- Beiyang Government

Political offices
Preceded by Li Shih-hou	Minister of Finance; 1920 (acting); 1926-1927	Succeeded by Chow Tsu-chi
Preceded by Wellington Koo	Minister of Finance; 1920 (acting); 1926-1927	Succeeded by Tang Erho
Preceded by Wellington Koo	Premier of China; 1927–1928	Succeeded by Tan Yankai
