= Robin Winks =

American historian

Robin W. Winks
- Robin W. Winks (1930-2003)
- Born: December 5, 1930; Indiana
- Died: April 7, 2003 (aged 72); New Haven, Connecticut
- Spouse: Avril (Flockton) Winks (m. 1952)
- Children: 2
- Writing career
- Subject: history

Robin W. Winks (December 5, 1930 in Indiana – April 7, 2003 in New Haven, Connecticut) was an American academic, historian, diplomat, writer on the subject of fiction, especially detective novels, and advocate for the National Parks. After joining the faculty of Yale University in 1957, he rose in 1996–1999 to become the Randolph Townsend Professor of History and Master of Berkeley College. At Oxford University he served as George Eastman Professor in 1992–93, and as Harmsworth Visiting Professor of American History in 1999–2000.

== Background ==
Born in Indiana in 1930, Winks graduated magna cum laude and Phi Beta Kappa from the University of Colorado in 1952. As a Fulbright Scholar in New Zealand he earned a master's degree in Maori studies from Victoria University before returning to the University of Colorado to earn a second master's degree in ethnography. He then earned a Ph.D. from Johns Hopkins University in 1957 with a dissertation on Canadian and American relations. After a year of teaching at Connecticut College, he joined the faculty at Yale in 1957, where he remained for the rest of his career. He held visiting lectureships and conducted research at universities around the nation and the world, including at Sydney University in 1963 where he lectured memorably on American History, Canada, Great Britain, New Zealand, South Africa, Nigeria, Sierra Leone, and the Middle East. He was on leave 1969–71 to serve as U.S. Cultural Attache to the American Embassy in London, and was a regular adviser to various governmental agencies.

Winks was a Fellow of the Explorers Club, the Society of American Historians, the Royal Historical Society, the Royal Commonwealth Society, and a member of both the Athenaeum Club and Special Forces Club. He was a Guggenheim Fellow, a Smith-Mundt Fellow, a Stimson Grant winner. In 1989 he won the Donner Medal from the Association for Canadian Studies in the United States.

Winks held offices and committee chairmanships in the American Historical Association, the Canadian Historical Association, the Organization of American Historians et al. He was honored with a Doctor of Humane Letters from the University of Nebraska–Lincoln and from the University of Colorado.

Winks died in 2003 in New Haven, Connecticut.

== National Parks ==
Winks was a lover of the outdoors and spent much of his career advocating for the protection of open spaces. He served as chair of the National Parks System Advisory Board, and in 1988, was awarded the Department of the Interior's Conservationist of the Year Award. In 1998, he became the first person to have visited all of the National Park Service units (there were 376 at that time). In 1999, the National Parks Conservation Association honored him with its first award for contributions to public education on behalf of the national parks. They subsequently established the honor as an annual award named the Robin W. Winks Award for Enhancing Public Understanding of National Parks

== Selected works ==
In a statistical overview derived from writings by and about Robin Winks, OCLC/WorldCat encompasses roughly 180 works in 460 publications in six languages and 24,000+ library holdings.

- Recent Trends and New Literature in Canadian History; five editions published between 1959 and 1967 in English
- Canada and the United States: The Civil War Years (McGill-Queen's Press, 1960); six editions published between 1960 and 1998 in English read online
- British Imperialism: Gold, God, Glory; five editions published between 1963 and 1973 in English search online
- The Historiography of the British Empire–Commonwealth: Trends, Interpretations and Resources; two editions published in 1966 in English
- Malaysia: Selected Historical Readings (with John Bastin) (Oxford University Press, 1966) search online
- The Age of Imperialism (Prentice-Hall, 1969); two editions published in 1969 in English search online
- The Historian as Detective: Essays on Evidence (New York: Harper & Row, 1969); published in 1969 in English search online
- Pastmasters: Some Essays on American Historians (with Marcus Cunliffe) (New York: Harper & Row, 1969) search online
- The Myth of the American Frontier: Its Relevance to America, Canada and Australia (Leicester University Press, 1971) search online
- The Blacks in Canada: A History (McGill-Queen's Press, 1971); 12 editions published between 1971 and 2004 in English read online
- Slavery: a Comparative Perspective; Readings on Slavery from Ancient Times to the Present; published in 1972 in English
- An American's Guide to Britain; five editions published between 1977 and 1987 in English
- Other Voices, Other Views: An International Collection of Essays from the Bicentennial (Greenwood Press, 1978) search online
- The Relevance of Canadian History: U.S. and Imperial perspectives (Macmillan of Canada: 1979) search online
- The American Identity: Fusion and Fragmentation (ed. Robin W. Winks, Sacvan Bercovitch, and Rob Kroes) (University of Amsterdam, 1980) search online
- Detective Fiction: A Collection of Critical Essays (Prentice-Hall, 1980); four editions published between 1980 and 1988 in English search online
- Modus Operandi: An Excursion into Detective Fiction' (Boston: D.R. Godine, 1981); three editions published between 1981 and 1990 in English search online read online
- Colloquium on Crime: Eleven Renowned Mystery Writers Discuss their Work; published in 1986 in English search online
- The Lily and the Lion: Royal France, Great Britain (with Philip Mansel) (Boston Publishing Company, 1987) search online
- Cloak & Gown: Scholars in the Secret War, 1939–1961 (Yale University Press: 1987); eight editions published between 1987 and 1996 in English Google Books preview
- A History of Civilization (Prentice-Hall, 1988) search online
- Asia in Western Fiction (with James R. Rush) (University of Hawaii Press, 1990) search online
- Frederick Billings: A Life (Oxford University Press, 1991); three editions published between 1991 and 1998 in English and Undetermined search online
- Asia in Western Fiction (with James R. Rush); six editions published between 1989 and 1990 in English
- The Historiography of the British Empire-Commonwealth: Trends, Interpretations, and Resources (Aldershot: Gregg Revivals, 1995) search online
- Laurance S. Rockefeller: Catalyst for Conservation; four editions published in 1997 in English
- Mystery and Suspense Writers: the Literature of Crime, Detection, and Espionage (New York: Scribner's Sons, 1998); two editions published in 1998 in English and held by 1,175 libraries worldwide search online
- Europe, Crisis and Conflict: 1890–1945 (with R.J.Q. Adams) (Oxford University Press, 2003)
- The Ancient Mediterranean World: From the Stone Age to A.D. 600 (with Susan P. Mattern) (Oxford University Press, 2004)
- Europe, 1648-1815: From the Old Regime to the Age of Revolution (with Thomas E. Kaiser) (Oxford University Press, 2004)
- Medieval Europe and the World: From Late Antiquity to Modernity, 400-1500 (with Teofilo F. Ruiz) (Oxford University Press, 2005)
- Europe and the Making of Modernity: 1815-1914 (with Joan Neuberger) (Oxford University Press, 2005)
