= Kian Gwan =

Multinational trading company

- Native name: 建源
- Industry: Opium trading
- Founder: Oei Tjie Sie
- Fate: Indonesian branch nationalised in 1961
- Headquarters: Semarang, Central Java, Dutch East Indies
- Website: https://idfood.co.id/

Kian Gwan (Chinese: 建源; pinyin: Jiànyuán; Pe̍h-ōe-jī: Kiàn-goân) was the largest multinational trading company in Southeast Asia in the early decades of the twentieth century, and was founded in 1863 in the Dutch East Indies (now Indonesia). It survives today as a diversified group in Thailand and in Indonesia, being nationalized in 1961, as PT Rajawali Nusantara Indonesia (Persero) (d.b.a. ID FOOD).

== History ==
Founded in 1863 by the self-made businessman Oei Tjie Sien, Kian Gwan began life as a small trading concern in Semarang, capital of Central Java, then in the Dutch East Indies. Oei's son and heir, the tycoon Oei Tiong Ham, took over the management of the company in 1893, and promptly incorporated it as Handel Maatschappij Kian Gwan.

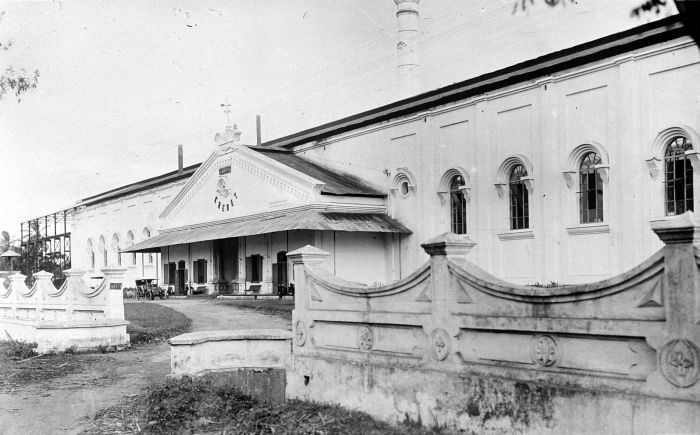
Krebet sugar factory in Malang, one of Kian-Gwan Kongsi's assets.

Oei's strategy was gradually to build up dominance in the highly lucrative opium market towards the end of the nineteenth century. This feat was all the more remarkable given the virtual control of the opium monopoly by more established, older concerns with close ties to the 'Cabang Atas', or the old Chinese upper class of colonial Indonesia. The bankruptcy of one of the older concerns in 1889 prompted the colonial government to host an auction to select new opium farmers.

This auction has gone down as one of the most competitive in history, described by the poet Boen Sing Hoo in his Boekoe Sair Binatang ("On Animals", published in 1895) as a real "peperangan diantara raja-raja" ("battle of kings"). It gave the young Oei and Kian Gwan an opportunity to establish themselves as a significant player. Boen's poem describes how the parvenu Oei, whom he calls Anak Sapi (the "Young Ox"), outbid the established Batavia partnership led by Kapitein Loa Tiang Hoei (Boen's Boeaja Emas or "Gold Crocodile") and Kapitein Oey Hok Tjiang.

Having gained control over the opium market of central Java, Kian Gwan went on to corner the sugar market. The company gradually integrated its plantations, mills, shipping lines, banks and complementary enterprises. A fleet of merchant ships was registered in Singapore (as Heap Eng Moh Steamship Co.). One of the employees in Singapore was Lee Hoon Leong, grandfather of the first Prime Minister of Singapore Lee Kuan Yew. This fully integrated chain, as James R. Rush points out, differed from the earlier opium empires and older Chinese concerns, for Oei's main competitors were not other Chinese, but the large European trading companies. Oei's company was also groundbreaking in employing professional personnel, instead of relying completely on family members in the old Chinese way. Only ownership of Kian Gwan rested with the family.

== Fate ==
Oei Tiong Ham died in Singapore in 1924. In his will, he named nine children as heirs, one of whom was Oei Tjong Hauw, whom he appointed to lead Kian-gwan Kongsi. Under Tjong Hauw, OTHC continue to expand, opening a rubber processing plant in Sumatra and an alcohol distillery in Shanghai. Tjong Hauw also led the company to Japan and Indonesia - in this period many assets such as factories were destroyed during World War II. Tjong Hauw died suddenly in 1950.

After Tjong Hauw died, Oei Tjong Tjay led OTHC. He was the youngest son of Oei Tiong Ham and Oei Ing Swie, son of Oei Tjong Hauw. Tjong Tjay, who was 27 at the time, found it difficult to adapt to the business climate in Indonesia, since he was raised abroad and lacked fluency in Indonesian language. Indonesia's uncertain political conditions at the time also made it difficult to expand OTHC; many considered OTHC to be pro-Dutch due to its close relation with the Dutch during the independence war. Notwithstanding, in this period OTHC established many joint venture with local and governmental figures, such as pharmaceutical company, Phapros which was established in 1954. Tjong chose to support the PSI and PNI party, but it the choice would become problematic when PSI figures were arrested and exiled abroad.

Dispute with the Indonesian government, which begins with the prosecution against Bank Indonesia in Amsterdam on OTHC disbursement breakdown in the bank, worsened relations toward the government. In July 1961, the Indonesian government decided to seize the entire assets of OTHC in Indonesia, and in 1964 the state-owned company Rajawali Nusantara Indonesia (RNI) was formed to manage these assets. This incident led to the end of OTHC in Indonesia, although Kian Gwan branches abroad survive under the sons of Oei Tiong Ham. One of the largest overseas branches is Kian Gwan Thailand, led by Oei Tjong Bo (the elder brother of Oei Tjong Tjay) that continues to this day in the field of property and electronic tools distributor.
