= Tang Erho =

Republic of China politician

T'ang Er-ho
- 湯爾和
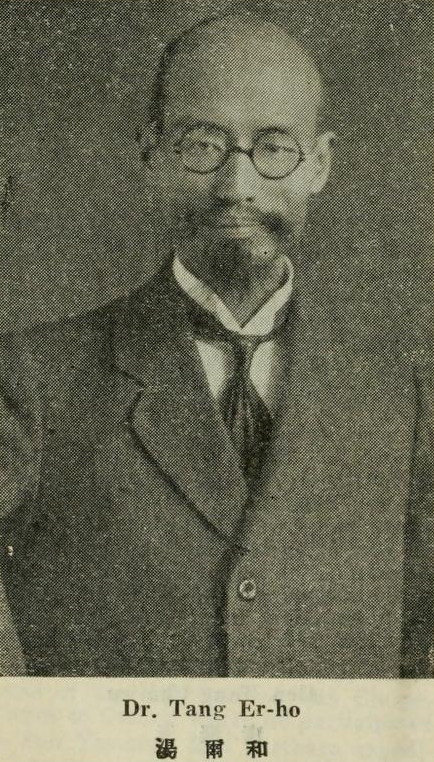

Minister of Finance of the Republic of China
- In office January 12, 1927 – June 20, 1927
- Preceded by: Pan Fu
- Succeeded by: Yan Zepu

Personal details
- Born: 1878 Hangzhou, Zhejiang Province, Empire of China
- Died: November 8, 1940 (aged 61–62) Beijing, Reorganized National Government of China
- Education: Humboldt University of Berlin

Tang Erho (simplified Chinese: 汤尔和; traditional Chinese: 湯爾和; pinyin: Tāng Ěrhé; Wade-Giles: T'ang Er-ho, 1878 – November 8, 1940) was a medical doctor and politician in the Chinese Beiyang government, later noted for his role as in the collaborationist Provisional Government of the Republic of China.

== Biography ==
Tang was a native of Hangzhou in Zhejiang Province. In 1902, he was dispatched to Tokyo, Japan, where he studied at the Seijo School. After his return to China in 1904, he worked initially as a music teacher. He returned to Japan in 1907, studying at the Kanazawa Medical University in Yokohama, and from there went to Germany, where he obtained his medical degree from the Friedrich Wilhelm University of Berlin. After his return to China in 1910, he was appointed to a post at the College of Physicians and has also served as deputy director of Zhejiang Hospital.

In 1911, Tang became active in politics under the Zhejiang military clique. After the formation of the Republic of China in 1912, he organized that National Medical School, and became its first principal. In 1915, he became the president of the Pharmaceutical Society of China. In 1920, he made an extended visit to Europe.

In July 1921, Tang was Deputy Director-General of the Ministry of Education. Following the 1923 Great Kantō earthquake, Tang led a delegation of the Red Cross Society of China to Japan for relief efforts, coordinating with overseas Chinese residents in Japan. In 1926, he rose to the position of Inspector-General of the Ministry of Finance, ultimately succeeding his boss, Pan Fu, in the job, for about six months.

However, after the collapse of the Beiyang government in 1929, Tang returned to Japan, where he obtained his doctorate in medicine at the Tokyo Imperial University. Returning to China in 1930, he served as a councilor to the Northeastern Army command. In 1933, he returned to Beijing, where he helped organize a committee for political affairs. He helped negotiate the Tanggu Truce with the Imperial Japanese Army in 1936 and helped organize the Hebei–Chahar Political Council.

In 1937, Tang joined the Provisional Government of the Republic of China under Wang Kemin, serving as chairman of the legislative assembly and chairman of the educational committee. In 1939, he was appointed president of Beijing University and concurrently Chairman of the Council of East Asian Culture. That same year, he gave the eulogy at the state funeral of Wu Peifu.

In 1940, with the formation of the Reorganized National Government of China under Wang Jingwei, Tang served on the North China Political Affairs Commission. It was largely assumed that Tang was Wang Kemin's successor, but Tang died of lung cancer in Beijing in November 1940.

Political offices
Preceded by Pan Fu	Minister of Finance of the Republic of China; 1927	Succeeded by Yan Zepu
