= Heap Eng Moh Steamship Co =

Heap Eng Moh Steamship Co.
- Formerly: NV Kian Gwan
- Industry: shipping
- Founded: 1905
- Founder: Oei Tiong Ham
- Headquarters: Singapore
- Key people: Oei Tiong Ham
- Owner: KPM (1928–????)

Heap Eng Moh Steamship Co. was a shipping line owned by Majoor Oei Tiong Ham, a Chinese Indonesian businessman.

== History ==
The company was founded by Oei Tiong Ham under the name "NV Kian Gwan" in 1905. His first ship was the Giang Bee built as Reijnierz in Rotterdam in 1908, later as HMS Giang Bee. The ship was sunk in the Banka Strait on 13 February 1942. The company was renamed as the Heap Eng Moh Steamship Company in 1909. Lee Hoon Leong (the grandfather of Lee Kuan Yew) worked on some of their ships as a purser, and eventually became managing director of the shipping Company.

Oei died in 1924 and the company was sold by the Oei family in 1928. The majority of the shares were purchased by KPM, a Dutch shipping company. KPM merged with the Java China Japan Lijn and eventually became Koninklijke Java-China-Paketvaart Lijnen (known as Royal Interocean Lines). In 1970 RIL became part of the Dutch Nederlandse Scheepvaart Unie and was merged with Nedlloyd Lijnen in 1977.

== Records ==
Some records of Heap Eng Moh Steamship Company are held in the National Archives of Singapore.
