= Wellington Koo =

Chinese diplomat (1888–1985)

- 顧維鈞
- Portrait by Harris & Ewing c. 1920s

President of China
- Acting; October 1, 1926 – June 17, 1927
- Premier: Himself
- Preceded by: Du Xigui (acting)
- Succeeded by: Zhang Zuolin (as Generalissimo of the Military Government)

Premier of China
- In office January 11, 1927 – June 16, 1927
- President: Himself
- Preceded by: Himself (acting)
- Succeeded by: Pan Fu
- Acting; October 1, 1926 – January 11, 1927
- President: Himself (acting)
- Preceded by: Du Xigui (acting)
- Succeeded by: Himself (as Premier)
- Acting; July 2, 1924 – September 14, 1924
- President: Cao Kun
- Preceded by: Sun Baoqi
- Succeeded by: Yan Huiqing

Chinese Ambassador to the United States
- In office June 27, 1946 – March 21, 1956
- Preceded by: Wei Tao-ming
- Succeeded by: Hollington Tong
- In office October 25, 1915 – September 29, 1920
- Preceded by: Kai Fu Shah
- Succeeded by: Alfred Sao-ke Sze

Personal details
- Born: January 29, 1888 Shanghai, Qing China
- Died: November 14, 1985 (aged 97) New York City, New York, U.S.
- Party: Kuomintang (1942–1985)
- Spouse(s): Chang Jun-o (m. 1908; div. 1912) Tang Pao-yueh "May" (m. 1912; died 1918) Oei Hui-lan (m. 1920; div. 1959) Juliana Young Koo (m. 1959)
- Children: 4
- Education: Columbia University (BA, MA, PhD)
- Occupation: Diplomat; politician
- Awards: Order of the Precious Brilliant Golden Grain; Order of Rank and Merit

Chinese name
- Traditional Chinese: 顧維鈞
- Simplified Chinese: 顾维钧
Transcriptions
Standard Mandarin
- Hanyu Pinyin: Gù Wéijūn
- Gwoyeu Romatzyh: Guh Weijiun
- Wade–Giles: Ku Wei-chün
Wu
- Romanization: Ku Vi-ciuin

Koo Vi Kyuin (Chinese: 顧維鈞; pinyin: Gù Wéijūn; Wade–Giles: Ku Wei-chün; January 29, 1888 – November 14, 1985), better known as V. K. Wellington Koo, was a Chinese diplomat.

Born in Shanghai, Koo studied in the United States, where he earned three degrees, including his doctorate in international law and diplomacy, from Columbia University. On his return to China in 1912, he became Yuan Shikai's secretary for foreign affairs, and in 1919, was a member of China's delegation at the Paris Peace Conference, where he unsuccessfully demanded the return of Shandong. He served as the Chinese ambassador to Great Britain the next year. Between 1922 and 1927, Koo successively served the Beiyang government as minister of foreign affairs, minister of finance, acting premier, and president. After the Northern Expedition toppled the government in 1928, Koo joined the Nationalist government and continued his diplomatic career.

In 1931, he represented China at the League of Nations to protest the Japanese invasion of Manchuria. He served as China's ambassador to France and Great Britain during World War II, and in 1945 represented China at the signing of the Charter of the United Nations. From 1946 to 1956, he served as the Republic of China's ambassador to the United States, and sat as a judge on the International Court of Justice in the Hague from 1957 to 1967. He retired to New York and died at the age of 97.

== Early life and education ==
Born in Jiading, now a suburb of Shanghai, in 1888, Koo grew up in an upper-class cosmopolitan family and was fluent in both English and French, which greatly aided his diplomatic career. In 1895, he was greatly affected by China's defeat at the hands of Japan in the First Sino-Japanese War, which led to the humiliating Treaty of Shimonoseki. Koo later wrote: "Ever since I was seven years old, when I heard with depressed heart the news of China's defeat by Japan, I had desired to work for China's recovery and the removal of the Japanese menace". Koo's father resolved to give him a "modern" education to help him prepare for the coming 20th century and to work for China's modernization. The naval battles during the recent war where the modern British-built warships of the Imperial Japanese Navy had blown out of the water the antiquated junks of the Imperial Chinese Navy had dramatically shown that modern, industrial powers had the advantage over backward nations. In 1897, Germany occupied the Shandong Province after a short campaign, which again showed to the young Koo that as long as China was backward, it would be bullied by stronger powers.

Aged 11, Koo was sent to be educated at the Anglo-Chinese Junior College in Shanghai, where he was taught in English various subjects such as modern science and geography, though his studies were cut short when he contracted typhoid fever. While at the college, Koo once rode a bicycle down the streets of Shanghai into the International Settlement and followed an English boy also riding a bicycle onto the sidewalk, where an Indian policeman allowed the English boy to continue while stopping Koo to give him a fine for riding his bicycle on the sidewalk. Koo was shocked to discover that owing to extraterritoriality, the laws and rules that applied to Chinese in China did not apply to British subjects—in this instance, laws prohibiting riding a bicycle on the sidewalk—and that a foreign policeman had power over the Chinese police. Koo was left with a lifelong desire to end the status of extraterritoriality that had been imposed by the 19th-century "unequal treaties".

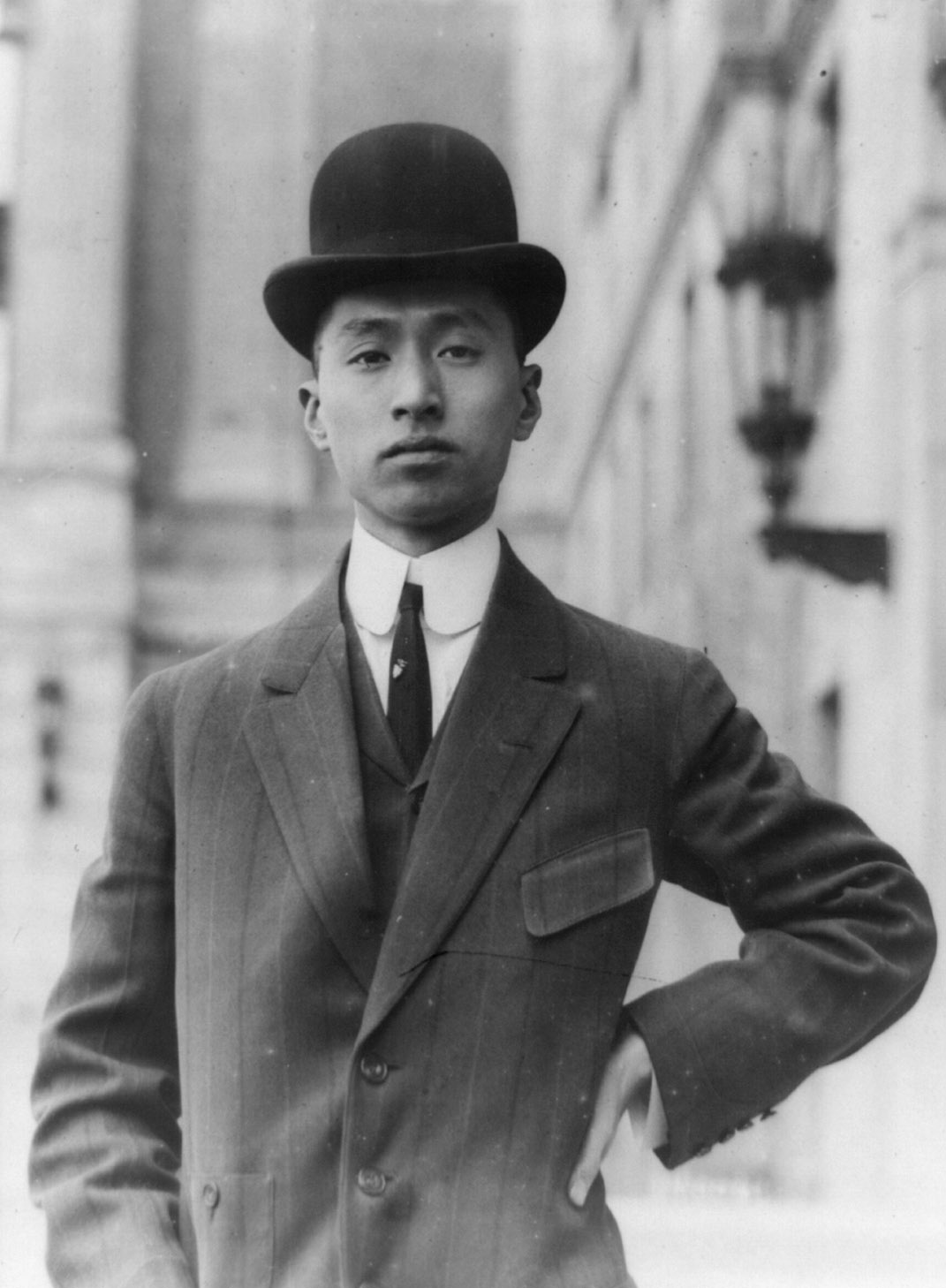
Koo in 1912

Koo studied at Saint John's University, Shanghai from 1901 to 1904, and Columbia University in New York City, where he was a member of the Philolexian Society, a literary and debating club, editor-in-chief of the Columbia Daily Spectator, and graduated with a B.A. in liberal arts (1908) and a M.A. in political science (1909). In 1912, he received his Ph.D. in international law and diplomacy from Columbia. His doctoral dissertation was titled, "The Status of Aliens in China".

== Early diplomatic career ==
Koo returned to Beijing in 1912. He served the Republic of China as English Secretary to President Yuan Shikai. In 1915, Koo was made China's Minister to the United States and Cuba.

== The Paris Peace Conference ==
In 1919, he was a member of the Chinese delegation to the Paris Peace Conference, led by Foreign Minister Lu Zhengxiang. In 1897, China had been forced to sign a treaty that gave a 99-year lease giving sovereignty over the city of Qingdao to Germany while also giving Germany various special rights and economic control over the Shandong peninsula. Qingdao became the principal German naval base in Asia. In 1914, Japan entered World War I on the Allied side and seized Qingdao after a siege. The Japanese made it very clear that they wished to take over the German rights in Shandong province by right of conquest, a demand that the Chinese vehemently rejected. In January 1915, Japan presented the 21 Demands that if accepted would have turned China into a virtual Japanese protectorate, warning in a note presented to the Chinese that Japan would take "vigorous methods" if the 21 Demands were rejected. Following protests from the United States that the 21 Demands would negate the Open Door policy towards trade with China, the Japanese dropped the more extreme of the 21 Demands. On May 25, 1915, the Japanese forced the Chinese to agree that after the war ended, the Japanese would take over all of the German rights in the Shandong peninsula, which caused protests all over China over what was deemed "National Humiliation Day".

As a young diplomat, Koo was strongly opposed to the acceptance of the Japanese demands. Koo had become close to President Woodrow Wilson, who invited him to visit the White House, where he was given to understand that the United States would support China's demands regarding the Shandong peninsula against Japan at the Paris Peace Conference. Wilson asked for Koo to attend the peace conference in Paris, and moreover, Koo travelled on the same ship that took Wilson and the rest of the American delegation to France in December 1918. The Canadian historian Margaret MacMillan wrote: "Koo, who was only thirty-two in 1919, was a forceful and distinguished personality...At Columbia University, in New York, where he earned an undergraduate and graduate degree, he had been an outstanding student...He had also been on the university debating team, as the Japanese delegates would learn to their cost".

The Chinese delegation stayed at the Hotel Lutétia, though the Australian journalist George Ernest Morrison who also served with the Chinese delegation stayed at the MacMahon Palais. On January 22, 1919, Alfred Sao-ke Sze of the Chinese delegation arranged for a dinner attended by Koo where Ronald Macleay of the British delegation frankly told that Britain "could not do much" in the matter of the Shandong. During the First World War, hundreds of thousands of Chinese coolies went to France where they dug the trenches for both the British and French armies, often under German fire. Koo argued very forcefully that though no Chinese troops had fought in Europe, the sacrifices of the Chinese coolies who dug the trenches amid appalling conditions on the Western Front entitled China to be treated as one of the powers that made an important contribution to the Allied victory. When Macleay suggested that Britain would probably favor the Japanese claims on the Shandong Peninsula because Japan had done more for the Allied victory than China, Koo countered him with saying that besides for expelling the Germans from the Shandong in 1914 that Japan had done nothing for the Allied cause while Chinese coolies had dug the trenches from the fall of 1914 onward until the end of the war in 1918.

Before the Western powers and Japan, he demanded that Japan return Shandong to China. On January 27, 1919, the peace conference turned towards Asia. Makino Nobuaki of the Japanese delegation tried to lump in Shandong with the Marshall Islands, Carolina islands and the Mariana Islands, which the Allies had already agreed would go to Japan. However, it was decided to sever Shandong from the Pacific islands. The next day, Lu disappeared and Koo took charge of the Chinese delegation. At the Quai d'Orsay, Makino gave a speech making Japan's case for the Shandong that made a poor impression owing to his haltering delivery with Wilson commenting afterwards that it had been "painful" to listen to Makino's speech.

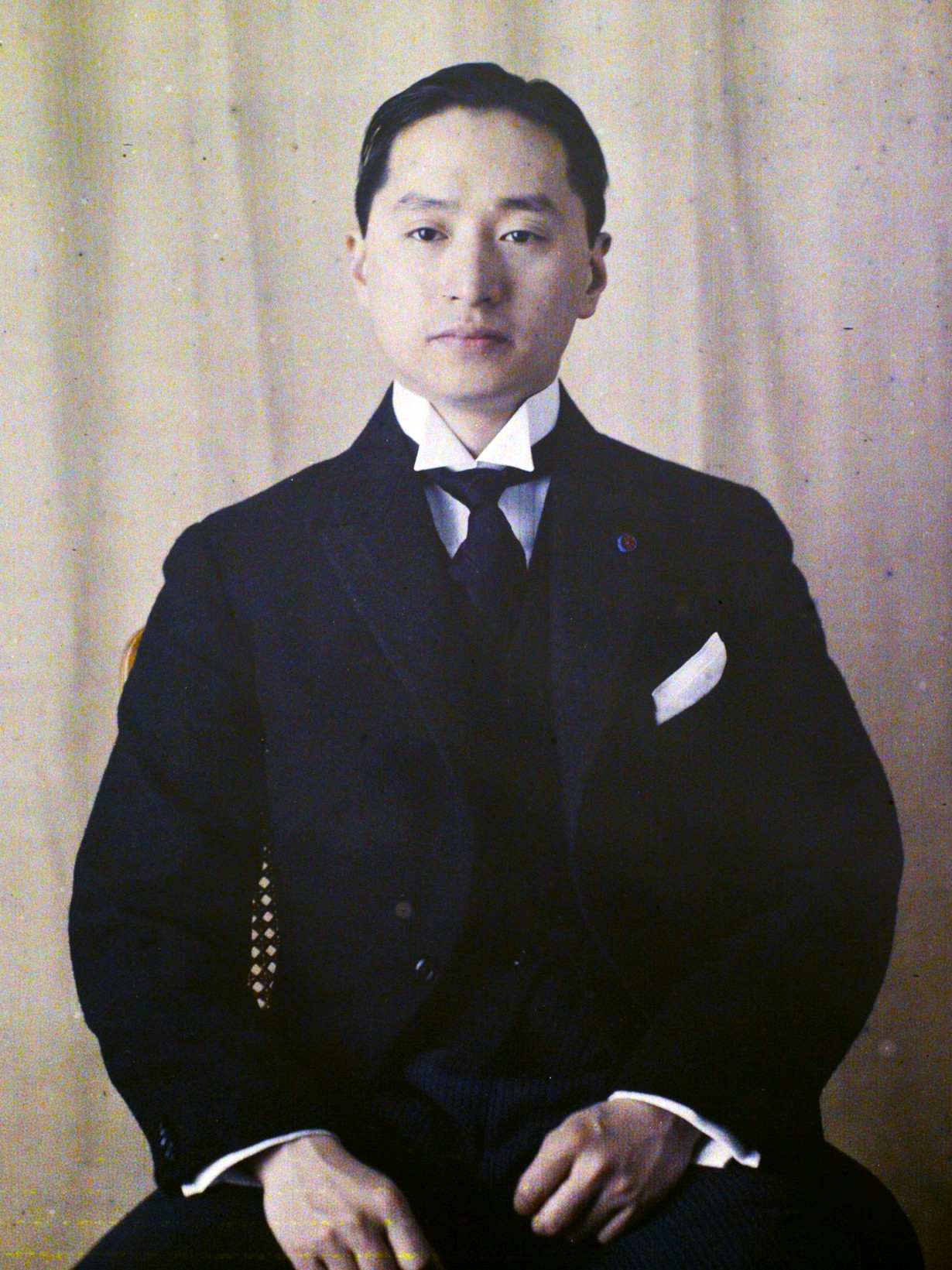
1920 Autochrome by Auguste Léon

On the morning of January 29, 1919, Koo gave a rebuttal speech in English that MacMillan described as "...a dazzling speech replete with learned references to international law and Latin tags". Koo argued that under international law that treaties signed under threats of violence were invalid, and as such the Sino-Japanese treaty of May 25, 1915, was invalid as China had signed under duress as Japan was threatening war if its terms were not met. He further stated that the original Sino-German treaty of 1897 was also invalid as Germany was threatening war unless the Reich was granted special rights in the Shandong. Koo stated that all the people of China were grateful to the Japanese for ending the harsh German rule over the Shandong in 1914, but noted: "But grateful as they are, the Chinese delegation felt that they would be false in their duty to China and to the world if they did not object to paying their debts of gratitude by selling the birthright of their countrymen and thereby sowing the seeds of discord in the future". Koo noted that under Wilson's 14 Points, the basis of the peace was to be national self-determination, which led him to argue that Japan had no right to the Shandong as its people were overwhelmingly Han and wanted to be part of China. Koo stated that the Shandong "was the cradle of Chinese civilization, the birthplace of Confucius and Mencius and a Holy Land for the Chinese". The French Premier Georges Clemenceau praised Koo for his eloquent speech. The American secretary of state, Robert Lansing, wrote that Koo had crushed the Japanese with his speech. The Canadian prime minister, Sir Robert Borden, called Koo's speech "very able".

Clemenceau described Koo as "a young Chinese cat, Parisian of speech and dress, absorbed in the pleasures of patting and pawing the mouse, even if it was reserved for the Japanese". Through mostly at odds with the Japanese delegation, Koo supported and voted for the Japanese-sponsored Racial Equality Proposal. On April 12, 1919, the British Prime Minister David Lloyd George bluntly asked Koo: "Which would China prefer-to allow Japan to succeed to the German rights in Shandong as stated in the treaty between China and Germany or to recognize Japan's position in Shandong as stipulated in the treaties between China and Japan?" Koo replied in English: "Both alternatives are unacceptable". Koo seized upon the 14 Points, which stated that secret treaties were invalid, to argue that the secret treaties in 1917 under which Great Britain, France and Italy all agreed to support Japan taking over the German rights in the Shandong peninsula, were invalid. Koo was greatly hurt when Lloyd George casually told him that China had made only the most "minimal" contributions to the Allied cause as he dismissed the work of the Chinese coolies in digging the trenches on the Western Front as unimportant. Lloyd George finally dismissed Koo's concerns about the 21 Demands under the grounds that he never heard of the 21 Demands. On April 22, 1919, in what Koo always saw as a betrayal, Wilson—whom he had invested such hopes in—came out in support of Japanese claims on the Shandong as he stated that "the war had been fought largely for the purpose of showing that treaties cannot be violated" and it was "better to live up to a bad treaty than tear it up" as he argued that China was bound by the 1915 treaty.

Koo's forceful advocacy of the Chinese case made him internationally famous while his status as a widower whose wife had just died of the "Spanish flu" conveniently ensured that he was free to marry again. The Oei family, a wealthy huaren (ethnic Chinese) family from the Dutch East Indies (modern Indonesia), had decided that Koo should marry Oei Hui-lan. During the last months of the Paris peace conference, Koo was often seen with Oei at dinners and social receptions. Koo's romance with Oei, whom he showered with flowers and gifts, distracted from his work at the conference. Oei complained in her memoirs that Koo spent his days pursuing her instead of engaging in his "important work as the second Chinese delegate".

On May 4, 1919, it was decided that the former German rights in the Shandong province would go to Japan, sparking the May Fourth Movement in China as hundreds of thousands of Chinese university students demonstrated against the decision. Koo found himself bombarded with telegrams from Chinese university students asking him not to sign the Treaty of Versailles if it meant ceding the Shandong, at one point receiving 7,000 such telegrams in a single day. Koo also called for an end to imperialist institutions such as extraterritoriality, tariff controls, legation guards, and lease holds. The Western powers refused his claims and, consequently, the Chinese delegation at the Paris Peace Conference was the only nation that did not sign the Treaty of Versailles at the signing ceremony. Initially, Koo had planned to sign the Treaty of Versailles as long he could insert reservations stating his government was opposed to the Japanese gaining the German rights in the Shandong. Clemenceau however told Koo that this procedure was unacceptable and that the Chinese could either sign the Treaty of Versailles or not sign. Koo was keen to have China be one of the founding members of the League of Nations, which would signify its desire to be treated as an equal by the other nations of the world. The possibility of not signing the Treaty of Versailles and being excluded from the League were major concerns for him, which led him to discover a loophole in the Treaty of St. Germain, which also included the Covenant of the League of Nations in its first section. In this way, Koo could avoid signing the Treaty of Versailles whilst he signed the Treaty of St. Germain, which made China automatically a member of the League of Nations.

Koo and Oei remained in Paris after the conference ended, and at an especially sumptuous ball attended by the elite of Paris society announced in French their engagement on October 10, 1919. By this time, many had assumed that Koo was already married to Oei as the fact that Koo's first wife had died in January of that year was not well known.

== Political career ==
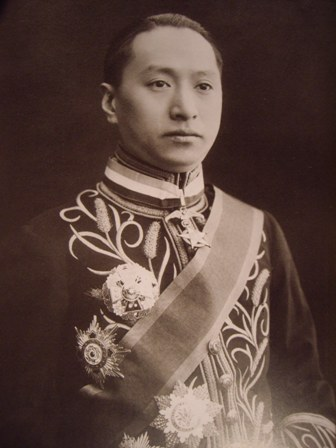
Koo in the 1920s

Koo also was involved in the formation of the League of Nations as China's first representative to the newly formed League. In 1921, Koo became the Chinese minister to Britain. Much to his displeasure, Punch published a ballad that "welcomed" Koo to London that read: "'Morality, heavenly link'/I'm sure you will never taboo,/Through to it, I don't think you'll 'eternally drink'/Temperate Wellington Koo/It is rather malicious, I own/To play with a name that is true/But I hope you'll condone my irreverent tone/Generous Wellington Koo". The implication of the ballad that Koo was a not a diplomat representing China who was worthy of respect, but rather just a foreigner with a "funny" name who existed to amuse the British greatly offended him. To make up for the slight, King George V invited Koo and his glamorous young wife, Hui-lan Oei, as the guests of honor at a reception at Buckingham Palace for the visiting King Albert I of Belgium. At the reception, the fluently English-speaking and youngish couple made a great impression on the high society of London.

In October 1921, Koo was reassigned as the Chinese minister in Washington. Koo was to represent China at the Washington Naval Conference, hence his sudden reassignment to Washington just after his arrival in London. Koo's principal opponent at the Washington conference was Kijūrō Shidehara, the Japanese ambassador in Washington. The Washington conference proved to be Koo's triumph as the conference ended with Japan renouncing its claims to the Shandong and the attending powers all signing the Nine-Power Treaty affirming the independence of China. After the conference, Koo returned to China a national hero.

From 1922, Koo served successively as Foreign Minister and Finance Minister. On May 15, 1924, he was the target of assassination attempt when an ornate gift package arrived at his house addressed to him, which Koo's servants opened instead. Upon opening the package, a bomb exploded, killing one of the servants while another two were badly wounded by the blast. The man who sent the package fled to Japan, which led Koo to conclude that the Japanese were behind the attempt on his life. Later that month, Koo signed a treaty with the Soviet Union under which the Soviet Union renounced all "Unequal treaties" that China had signed with Imperial Russia in exchange for which Koo recognized the de facto independence of Outer Mongolia, which until then he had claimed as part of China. Koo opened up talks with the British for the return of the British colony of Weihaiwei, which the British had signed a 25-year lease on in 1898, which led Koo to argue as 1923 had already passed, the lease had expired. There was much spirited disagreements as the British were unwilling to consider returning the colony, despite the fact the 25-year lease had expired in 1923.

The talks were broken off when the warlord General Feng Yuxiang, aka "the Christian General" seized Beijing, forcing Koo to flee for his life. Much to Koo's own humiliation, he was forced to take refuge in Weihaiwei. The British authorities in Weihaiwei refused Feng's demand to hand over Koo to his men, who would almost certainly had executed him. Feng's rule over Beijing did not last long as the capital was soon taken by the army of another warlord, Marshal Zhang Zuolin, the "Old Marshal" of Manchuria. With Beijing in the hands of Zhang, Koo returned to the city. Koo disliked Zhang, an illiterate bandit turned warlord who professed to be fighting to restore the "Great Qing Empire", but was willing to work with him as Zhang favored diplomacy to revise the "Unequal treaties" instead of war, a choice of options that coincided with Koo's own preferences. Zhang had a reputation as one of China's most brutal warlords, but his inability to read and write led him to crave the approval of intellectuals. Zhang appointed Koo as his premier and foreign minister, hoping this would add luster to his regime and would lead to foreign governments recognizing his government. Ominously, for Zhang, the British refused to recognize his government and dropped hints that they favored the rival government based in Guangzhou led by Dr. Sun Yat-sen.

He was twice Acting Premier, in 1924 and again in 1926 during a period of chaos in Beijing under Zhang Zuolin in 1926–7. Koo was Acting Premier from October 1, 1926, and acted concurrently as Interim President. (On March 12, 1925, Sun Yat-sen died in Wellington Koo's home in Beijing, where he had been taken when it was discovered he had incurable liver cancer.) As Foreign Minister, he often clashed with Sir Miles Lampson, the British minister-plenipotentiary in Beijing over his demands that China have the right to control its own tariffs and the end of British extraterritoriality, demands that Lampson vehemently rejected. Lampson had essentially Victorian views of China and his relations with Koo were stormy. Lampson reported to London that after one meeting that he had "harangued Koo till I had exhausted my vocabulary".

He served as Premier from January until June 1927, when he resigned after Zhang organized a military government. After the Northern Expedition toppled the government in Beijing in 1928, he was briefly wanted for arrest by the new Nationalist government in Nanjing, but through Zhang Xueliang's mediation he was reconciled with the new government and returned to the diplomatic service. He represented China at the League of Nations to protest the Japanese invasion of Manchuria.

Much to Koo's fury, the British Foreign Secretary Sir John Simon, was able to insist the League not take action against Japan, and instead appoint a commission to examine whether Japan had committed aggression or not. Koo was assigned to the League's Lytton Commission-so called after its chairman, Lord Lytton-that was sent in December 1931 to go to Manchuria to investigate if Japan was an aggressor or not.

== Ambassador in Paris ==
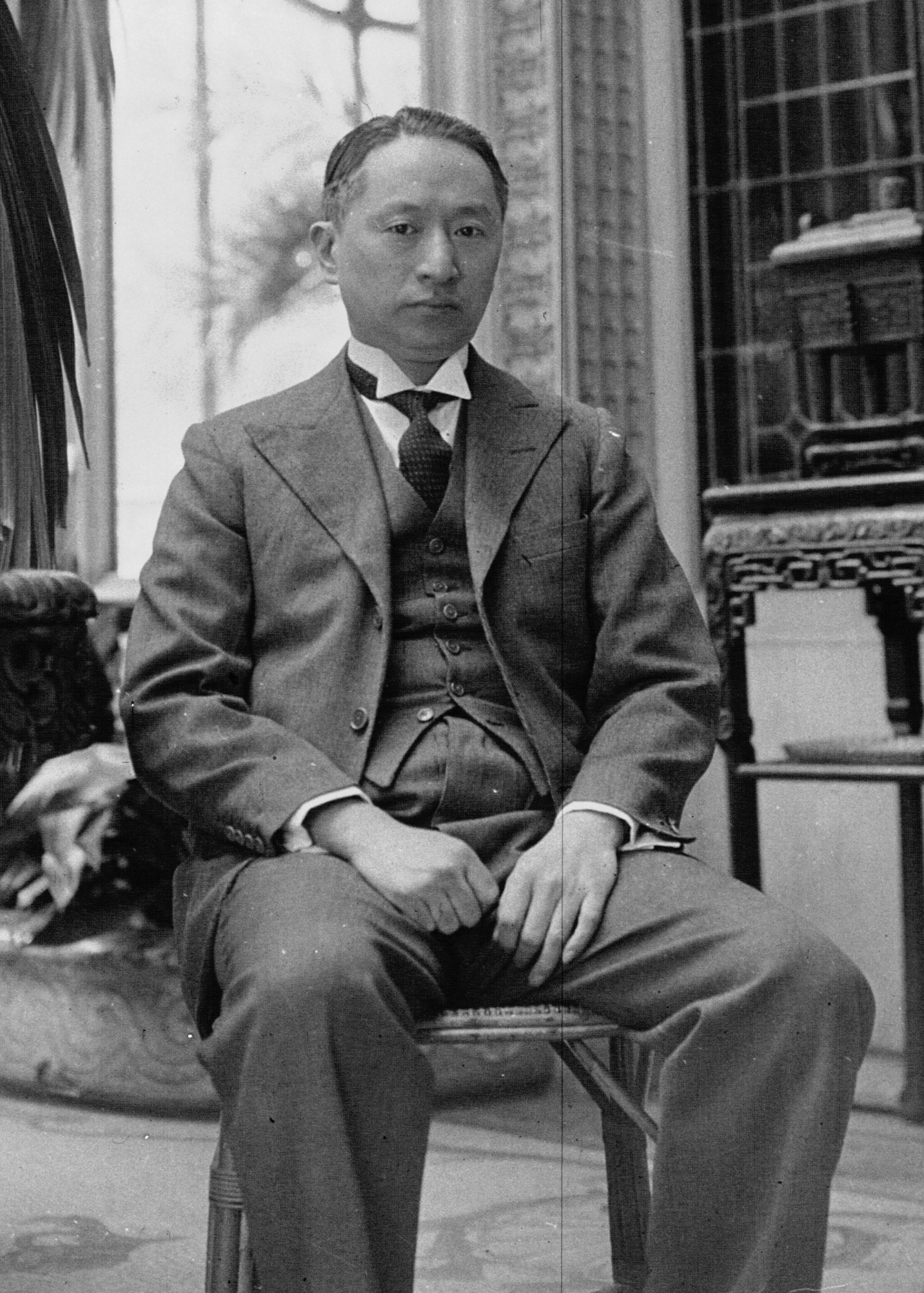
Koo in 1936

In August 1932, Koo arrived in Paris as the Chinese minister-plenipotentiary. Koo also concurrently served as the chief of the Chinese delegation to the League of Nations when it was holding its sessions in Geneva.

When Lord Lytton finally presented his report to the League in February 1933 concluding that Japan had indeed committed aggression, it was the subject of much debate within the League. In March 1933, Koo gave what was described as a very strong speech, urging the League to finally act against Japan, now that it was established by the Lytton commission that Japan had committed aggression. The Japanese delegate to the League, Yōsuke Matsuoka, promptly announced that his government did not accept the Lytton report and was leaving the League, effective immediately.

During the Abyssinia Crisis caused by the Italian invasion of Ethiopia in 1935, Koo was a strong supporter of having the League of Nations apply sanctions against Italy, believing this was a hopeful precedent that might led to the nations that belonged to the League supporting China should Japan invade. In May 1936, the Italians took the Ethiopian capital of Addis Ababa and Benito Mussolini proclaimed victory in Rome. Though the Italians never fully controlled the Ethiopian countryside, the conquest of Ethiopia was a major blow to the prestige of the League of Nations. Koo wrote at the time that at the League's headquarters in Geneva there was "a general sickening atmosphere at the impotence and cowardice" of the League in face of the Italian aggression against Ethiopia. On a more hopeful note for Koo, he met the Soviet foreign commissar Maxim Litvinov who often attended the sessions of the League and discussed with him the possibility of Soviet aid to China.

In 1936, France and China upgraded their relations from the legation to embassy level, and Koo thus became the first Chinese ambassador to France. Fluent in French, Koo and his wife tried very hard to join the high society of Paris, believing it was the best way to make China's case to the French elite. At one party, a French society hostess who believed him to the Japanese ambassador told him: "Japan is a big power, becoming more powerful by the day. You will surely be able to shallow up China". Koo was forced to tell her that he was actually the Chinese ambassador and the last thing he wanted to see was his country being "shallowed up" by Japan. Likewise, Madame Koo tried to leave a party by asking her hosts to call for her chauffeur and her limousine, only for the Japanese ambassador's limousine and chauffeur to appear, as her hosts did not know the difference between Japanese and Chinese. Koo's two teenage sons embarrassed him by throwing deck chairs in a lake in a Paris park, and tried to claim diplomatic immunity when a French gendarme ordered them to stop. The incident attracted much adverse comment in the French newspapers about the badly behaving sons of the Chinese ambassador who were trying to abuse diplomatic immunity.

The Chinese diplomats in Europe together with their families formed a closely knit group who frequently met to discuss matters of common concern. Koo together with Guo Taiqi (the ambassador in London), Tsiang Tingfu (the ambassador in Moscow), Tsien T'ai (the minister-plenipotentiary in Brussels) and Liang Long (the minister-plenipotentiary in Prague) formed an informal group of intellectuals-turned-diplomats who had similar values and beliefs. The Chinese diplomats stationed in Europe were all intellectuals who given up promising careers in academia to pursue careers in diplomacy in order to best serve China. Cheng Tien-fong, the ambassador in Berlin, was considered to be the "weakest link" amongst the Chinese diplomats with the feeling being that he was unqualified to be a diplomat.

== Second Sino-Japanese war ==
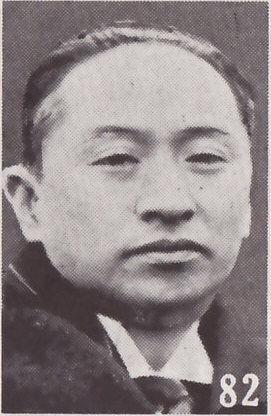
Koo c. late 1930s

In July 1937, Japan invaded China. On July 7, 1937, the Marco Polo Bridge Incident occurred, and the Japanese promptly sent 5 divisions into northern China that advanced on Beijing. Koo spent many sleepless nights in the summer of 1937 as he worried deeply about the crisis. Koo met several times with diplomats from the Japanese embassy in Paris in an attempt to find a diplomatic solution, but the Japanese kept making extreme demands that Koo rejected. Koo wrote in his diary that the news from China was "depressing" as he expressed dismay at the news that the Japanese had taken Beijing, adding in "I felt no face to see anybody. China has become a joke". Koo broke off talks with the Japanese who had rejected his demand that Beijing be returned to China. Koo wrote in his diary that reports that the Japanese were heavily bombing Tianjin "made his hair stand up" with fear. Later that same month, the Japanese took Tianjin, which Koo called his diary the "most depressing and sickening news".

As China had hardly an arms industry at the time and needed to import arms, the Chinese were at a disadvantage against the better armed Japanese, whose more industrialized nation did have an arms industry. Koo's principal duty in Paris was to secure the supply of arms into China via a railroad that ran from the French colony of Indochina (modern Vietnam) into China. The arms that were carried into China were not just French, but also came from the Soviet Union. Several times, the French cabinet considered closing the railroad following complaints from the Japanese embassy in Paris and dark hints that Japan might invade Indochina if the railroad were not closed, but Koo was always able to persuade the French to keep the railroad running. Koo felt that the best response to the Japanese invasion was a Sino-Soviet alliance with "Anglo-American-French material co-operation in the background". Koo believed that as the victors of World War I that both Britain and France had a vested interest in upholding the international order created after that war with "the moral sympathy and support of the United States". Koo argued that the Franco-Soviet alliance provided for a certain stability in Europe, and the lack of the same stability in Asia was what explained why "Japan could run amuck". Koo felt it was in their own interests of Britain, France, the Soviet Union, and the United States to support China, and he was gravely disappointed when he discovered that his viewpoint was not as widely shared as he had assumed.

As the chief of the Chinese delegation, Koo went to Geneva to lodge a formal complaint at the League of Nations, arguing that Japan was guilty of aggression and the League should impose sanctions on Japan, just as it had imposed sanctions on Italy for its aggression against Ethiopia in 1935. Koo did not expect the League to take action, and the failure of the League to save Ethiopia was hardly an auspicious precedent. However, Koo thought an appeal to the League might win public sympathy in the West. At a meeting with the French Foreign Minister Yvon Delbos, Koo learned that the French "advised delay". Koo in turn told Delbos: "The aggression of Japan against China was too flagrant, and if the League should refuse to take cognizance of it, the League would become a complete farce". Delbos cynically told Koo that the League was useless and that "You might as well call for the moon for help as much as the League of Nations". In September 1937, Koo gave a speech to the League, asking for Japan to be declared the aggressor. Koo reported to Nanjing that it was clear that "the League could not do much" and that "the matter hinged with Britain and France", the two veto-holding members of the League Council. Both the British and French delegations advised Koo not to ask for sanctions against Japan, warning that the United States was not a member of the League and that sanctions against Japan would only work if the Americans also applied sanctions. Koo himself thought that calling for sanctions would be a mistake as American "collaboration" with imposing sanctions was essential, but the Waichiaopu insisted that Koo ask for sanctions against Japan.

Koo was urged to take his case to the League's Far Eastern Advisory Committee instead of the League Assembly, advice he was predisposed to accept. Koo wrote it "was useless to force things if the powers were unwilling" and it was better to "work with them instead of against them". The Waichiaopu rejected his advice and ordered him to make a case for sanctions. On September 16, 1937, Koo gave a speech at the League's Far Eastern Advisory Committee, asking for the League to declare Japan the aggressor, impose wide-ranging sanctions to cripple the Japanese economy and provide China with economic support. In his appeal, Koo listed a number of war crimes committed by the Japanese, being careful to only quote from reports from Europeans and Americans in order to avoid accusations of bias. Speaking with great anger, Koo stated: "In Tianjin, the most crowded parts of the Chinese city were bombed by Japanese aeroplanes, killing hundreds of people for no other reason than to terrorize civilians. The sight of mangled bodies and the cries of the maimed and wounded were so sickening to the hearts of the foreign Red Cross doctors that they voiced the fervent wish that the governments of the civilized Powers would make an effort to stop the carnage". As Koo had predicted, both Britain and France used their veto powers to prevent Japan from being declared the aggressor. In his speech, Koo declared that every day the Japanese were indiscriminately bombing Chinese cities, killing hundreds of innocent people and declared: "Public opinion everyway in the world was indignant, and expected the League to do something". All that Koo achieved was a resolution from the League criticizing the Japanese policy of indiscriminate bombing of Chinese cities, and instead asked for the Japanese to engage in discriminate bombing of Chinese military targets.

On October 1, 1937, at a meeting of the Far Eastern Advisory Committee, the British delegate to the League, C.A. Edmond, announced that his government wanted to see a Nine-Power conference to be held in Brussels about seeking a diplomatic solution to the Sino-Japanese war. Koo wrote the British offer "fell like a bomb, deafening the senses". In an attempt to involve the United States, the British resolution called all the powers that signed the Nine-Power Treaty of 1922 (which included the United States) to attend a conference in Brussels to discuss a solution to the war. On October 5, 1937, the Far Eastern Advisory Committee submitted to the League Assembly a resolution criticizing the Sino-Japanese war in general without saying which power was responsible, and merely asked that all of the League members not to take any steps that might weaken China's ability to resist. Koo was dissatisfied with the attempt to shift the onus on action from the League to the signatory powers of the Nine-Power Treaty, saying that: "the Washington Treaty cannot relieve League members of their obligations under the Covenant". Koo was chosen to head the Chinese delegation to the Brussels conference, which took place in November 1937. Koo believed that American involvement in the Brussels conference signaled a determination on the part of President Franklin D. Roosevelt to take action, saying he believed that "the United States...would not like to see the conference fail and admit defeat". However, Koo's hopes were dashed by a meeting with William Christian Bullitt Jr., the American ambassador to France, who was a close friend of President Roosevelt. Koo was warned that the United States was unwilling to take a leadership role at the conference and would prefer that Koo not attend to provide "full liberty of discussion". Before departing, Koo told Delbos: "China did not want peace at any price, but only peace with justice". In the meantime, the Japanese had threatened to bomb French Indochina if the French continued to allow arms to be imported into China. On October 17, 1937, Koo was informed that France would continue to allow arms to be sold to China, but none could be taken in via the Indochinese railroad, which in effect cut China off from French arms. In response to vehement criticism from Koo, the French reversed their position and agreed to reopen the railroad, albeit on a "temporary" basis.

On October 31, 1937, Koo left Paris for Brussels, and his train took him through a number of battlefields of World War One. Koo later wrote that as he watched from his train the still recovering French countryside that it "led me to reflect that although the youthfulness of the trees and the relative newness of the buildings still told the story of the war, the world had learned little from it. A new war was in the atmosphere everywhere". On November 3, 1937, the conference opened and Koo gave a speech accusing Japan of aggression. Japan was invited to attend the conference, but the Japanese chose to boycott it instead. Norman Davis, the head of the American delegation, took the viewpoint that it was up to Britain and France to confront Japan and that the United States would only do the barest minimum possible to restrain Japan. Koo who had expected more of the Americans was deeply discouraged. The French were only prepared to act if the United States was willing to take the lead as the French saw Franco-American co-operation in Asia as a way of bringing the United States into European affairs to restrain Germany. The British likewise would only act in Asia if the United States were willing to take the lead. On November 12, 1937, Japan issued a statement firmly ruling out taking part in the Brussels conference and refused the offer of mediation, claiming that the war was a defensive struggle as the Japanese maintained that China was the aggressor. After the conference, Koo met with the American and British delegations, saying that all he wanted was for the United States and the United Kingdom to ship arms on a massive scale to China while offering up a "guarantee" to protect French Indochina from a Japanese attack. Koo argued that: "just as domestic order requires more than laws on the statute books, mere words are insufficient to restore peace and order in the face of international violence". At a press conference, Koo stated that at the conference Britain had acted like a "friend" towards China while the United States had not, a remark that infuriated Davis. However, Koo continued to invest his hopes in the United States, writing "that the United States could save the situation if it only act quickly and energetically".

In December 1937, Koo's spirits sank to a new low by the news that the Japanese had taken Nanjing, the capital of China, which was promptly followed up by the infamous Nanjing Massacre. That same month, the Japanese sank the American gunboat U.S.S. Panay on the Yangtze river and in the process killed several American sailors. Koo hoped that the Panay incident might lead to the United States taking action against Japan, and he was disappointed when Roosevelt chose instead to accept the Japanese apology that the sinking of the Panay was a mistake, despite the fact the Panay was flying the US flag at the time the Japanese aircraft bombed the gunboat. Koo noted in his reports that the French were worried that keeping the Indochinese railroad open would lead to a Japanese invasion of Indochina. Koo countered this thesis by arguing that if the Japanese conquered China, it would be likely that they would try to conquer Indochina, and it was in France's own interest to assist China. Despite their fears, the Indochinese railroad remained open.

== Europe in the late 1930s ==
During the Sudetenland crisis of 1938, Koo favored having the idea of deterring Germany from invading Czechoslovakia by involving the League of Nations, whose charter called for "collective security" in the event of aggression. Koo believed that this represented a precedent that could be applied to China. The French cabinet minister that Koo was most close to was Georges Mandel, the minister of the colonies. As the colonial minister, Mandel was in charge of French Indochina and thus had the power to allow or deny arm shipments to China. By contrast, Koo had difficult relations with Georges Bonnet, the foreign minister who was in favor of ceasing arm shipments to China to improve relations with Japan. Though Mandel did not always have the authority to so, he continued to allow Soviet arms to be shipped via Indochina to China over the protests of both Bonnet and the Japanese. Koo reported that through the French Premier Édouard Daladier did not always support the anti-appeasement faction in his cabinet led by Mandel, but that Daladier was sympathetic towards China and overruled Bonnet when he pressed to have the Indochinese railroad closed. French premiers in the Third Republic had powers analogous to the chairmen of a committee as cabinets in the Third Republic were coalition governments. The Daladier cabinet was divided into three factions with the "peace lobby" (appeasement) faction led by Bonnet; the "firmness" (anti-appeasement) faction led by Mandel; and Daladier leading another faction that rested uneasily between the other two.

The ambassador that Koo spoke with the most was William Christian Bullitt Jr., the American ambassador to France. Bullitt was a close friend of President Franklin D. Roosevelt who had appointed him ambassador to France in 1936 to serve as his personal representative in Paris as Bullitt completely by-passed the Secretary of State, Cordell Hull, and instead sent his reports straight to the president, whom he also spoke to by telephone at least once every week. Koo had hopes that speaking to Bullitt would influence Roosevelt. In July 1938 when the Treasury Secretary, Henry Morgenthau Jr., visited Paris, Bullitt introduced him to Koo, whom spoke about the need for American economic aid to China. Through Morgenthau could make no promises on behalf of Congress, he promised to use his influence in Washington to lobby for financial aid to China.

In September 1938, Koo attended the fall session of the League of Nations in Geneva, where he pressed for sanctions against Japan. In his speech, Koo complained at the previous sessions of the League in September 1938 and in May 1938, all China had received were "nicely-worded resolutions", going on to say "The resolutions remain nothing, but empty words." Citing the Sudetenland crisis, both the British and French delegations asked for Koo not to speak about the Sino-Japanese war, saying this was not an opportune time to speak of the issue, but Koo ignored their objections.

After the Munich Agreement, Koo reported to Chongqing that Germany was now the dominant power in eastern Europe, which he felt had important ramifications for China. Koo wrote that the result of the Sudetenland crisis had badly damaged the prestige of France, which led him to predicate that the French would become more preoccupied with European affairs at the expense of Asian affairs. Koo wrote that the way that Czechoslovakia—a major French ally since 1924—had been forced to accept a highly unfavorable settlement in the form of the Munich Agreement, had left France's other allies in eastern Europe such as Poland, Yugoslavia and Romania "fearful" of the future. Koo predicted that the French would either accept eastern Europe as being in the German sphere of influence or make an attempt to retain influence in eastern Europe by strengthening their existing alliances, arguing that the latter was the more likely of the two scenarios. Koo described the British prime minister Neville Chamberlain as an "old man" who ignored "obligations under international law or the principle of international morality" during the crisis. Koo wrote that Chamberlain wanted to revive the 19th century Concert of Europe by creating an Anglo-German duumvirate that would "dominate and control the smaller and weaker powers". Koo argued that Chamberlain's attempts to create an Anglo-German dominated new Concert of Europe had finished off the League of Nations as a force in world politics and would have a disastrous impact on Anglo-Soviet relations, which had never been friendly to begin with. Finally, Koo concluded that Joseph Stalin was angry at the way that the Soviet Union had been snubbed during the Sudetenland crisis, which he argued would focus Soviet attention on Europe at the expense of Asia. He felt that the possibility of an Anglo-German new Concert of Europe would greatly strain Anglo-Soviet relations. Koo stated that he believed that the Soviet Union would never a risk a war with Japan as long as Germany continued to expand into Eastern Europe and would hence limit the amount of aid it would provide China to avoid a war with Japan, through he also predicted that the Soviets would not cut off aid to China as they preferred to keep the Japanese engaged in the war.

On November 3, 1938, the Japanese Prime Minister, Prince Fumimaro Konoe, called a press conference in Tokyo where he proclaimed the "New Order in Asia" as he made a statement to the effect that Japan was now the hegemonic power in Asia and that China was in the Japanese sphere of influence. The American, British and French governments all issued statements rejecting the Japanese claim to the "New Order in Asia", which encouraged Koo. Koo was especially encouraged by the American statement, which he felt reflected "a hardening of the American attitude vis-á-vis Japan". Koo noted that the French were still permitting military supplies to be sent to China through French Indochina, and his thesis that helping China was a way of helping France by keeping the Japanese engaged was winning him friends in Paris.

On March 15, 1939, Germany occupied the Czech part of Czecho-Slovakia, creating the Protectorate of Bohemia-Moravia. In response, a new Anglo-French policy of creating a "peace front" to deter Germany from further aggression was inaugurated. During the Danzig crisis, Koo supported the policy of the "peace front", believing that it would benefit China by preventing a war in Europe that would benefit Japan by distracting Anglo-French attention away from Asia. Koo tried to associate China with the "peace front", arguing that supporting China would benefit both Britain and France by keeping the Japanese engaged in China, which in turn would limit the possibility of the Japanese attacking the British and French colonies in Asia. Koo described Japan as a nation bent "on the conquest of China, subjection of Asia and finally domination of the world". Somewhat paradoxically, Koo found himself defending the "unequal treaties" that he was normally opposed to as he argued to French leaders that the Japanese conquest of China would "make it impossible to safeguard legitimate western rights and interests, and that respect for China's sovereignty and maintenance of the open door".

In June 1939, Koo discovered a senior Chinese diplomat, Huang Zheng, had been selling visas to Jewish refugees from Germany, Austria and Czechoslovakia. Koo recorded the incident: "Apparently an agreement was signed between a travel agency and the visa office of the consulate-general to secure Chinese government passports for Jews who had fled by the hundreds, if not the thousands, from the Fascist- and Nazi-dominated parts of Europe...and the applicants were charged 800 francs upon receiving a visa, which was well above the regular fee, and, as was reported to me, the money was divided between one certain travel agency, through which only the Jewish applicants could get the passports from the consulate-general annex, and the Chinese consulate-general. It was evidently an illicit, unauthorized and unjustifiable attempt by the issuing group to exploit the situation of the Jews".

Huang was suspended and the Waichiaopu told Koo that the visas were invalid. The leaders of several French Jewish groups met with Koo to ask him to lobby the Waichiaopu to allow the Jewish refugees to travel with the visas, arguing that though Huang was corrupt, that the refugees had purchased the visas in good faith to escape Europe. Koo did press the Waichiaopu to allow the Jewish refugees to go to China. On June 22, 1939, Koo stated he read reports in the French press of a plan to settle Jewish refugees in Yunnan province, leading him to ask his superiors what was the Chinese attitude towards accepting Jewish refugees. Koo also noted the refugees wanted to settle in Shanghai, which was the largest and wealthiest city in China, and which had been occupied by the Japanese in November 1937. Koo argued it was not clear if the Japanese would actually allow the Jews to settle in Shanghai, but that allowing Jewish refugees to travel to Shanghai with visas issued by the Republic of China was an important symbolic gesture that the Republic was still the legitimate government of all China.

== War in Europe ==
On September 1, 1939, Germany invaded Poland and on September 3, Britain and France declared war on Germany. Koo wrote in his diary on September 3, 1939: "These are momentous days in history, the beginning of a war which may alter the face of the world and of civilization itself". Shortly afterwards, Koo suggested in a message to Chiang Kai-shek that China formally declared its wish to align with the Allied powers and to offer Chinese resources and manpower to aid the Allied cause in Europe. On November 30, 1939, the Soviet Union invaded Finland, leading to calls to expel the Soviet Union from the League of Nations. At the session of the League Assembly when a vote was taken to expel the Soviet Union, Koo as the chief of the Chinese delegation chose to abstain from the vote, which ended with the Soviet Union become the first and only member to be expelled from the League.

On June 18, 1940, the Japanese submitted an ultimatum threatening to invade Indochina if the French did not end all arms sales to China at once. On June 20, 1940, the government of Philippe Pétain submitted to the ultimatum and ended all arms sales to China. On June 21, 1940, an armistice was signed, taking France out of the war. Koo briefly served as the Chinese ambassador in Vichy, where he was forced to live under reduced conditions. Under the armistice signed on June 21, 1940, Germany imposed harsh reparations on France while the franc was artificially devalued in regard to the Reichsmark, which essentially allowed the occupiers to loot France. Owing to the shortage of food in occupied France, Koo's wife observed that he was forced to eat canned food for the first time in his entire life. Koo spent the rest of the summer of 1940, trying to persuade Vichy officials to resume arms shipments. Koo reported to Chongqing that France was "powerless" in Asia as he stated that he had information on good authority that the Germans had ordered that the French should not "provoke" the Japanese. In July 1940, the British submitted to a Japanese ultimatum and closed the Burma Road, though the road was reopened again in October 1940. In September 1940, the Japanese occupied the northern half of French Indochina. For Koo, the only hopeful news that the United States reacted sharply to the Japanese advance into Indochina, warning Tokyo that this was regarded in Washington as an extremely unfriendly act, and that the Japanese should not occupy the southern half of French Indochina under any conditions.

== Ambassador in London ==
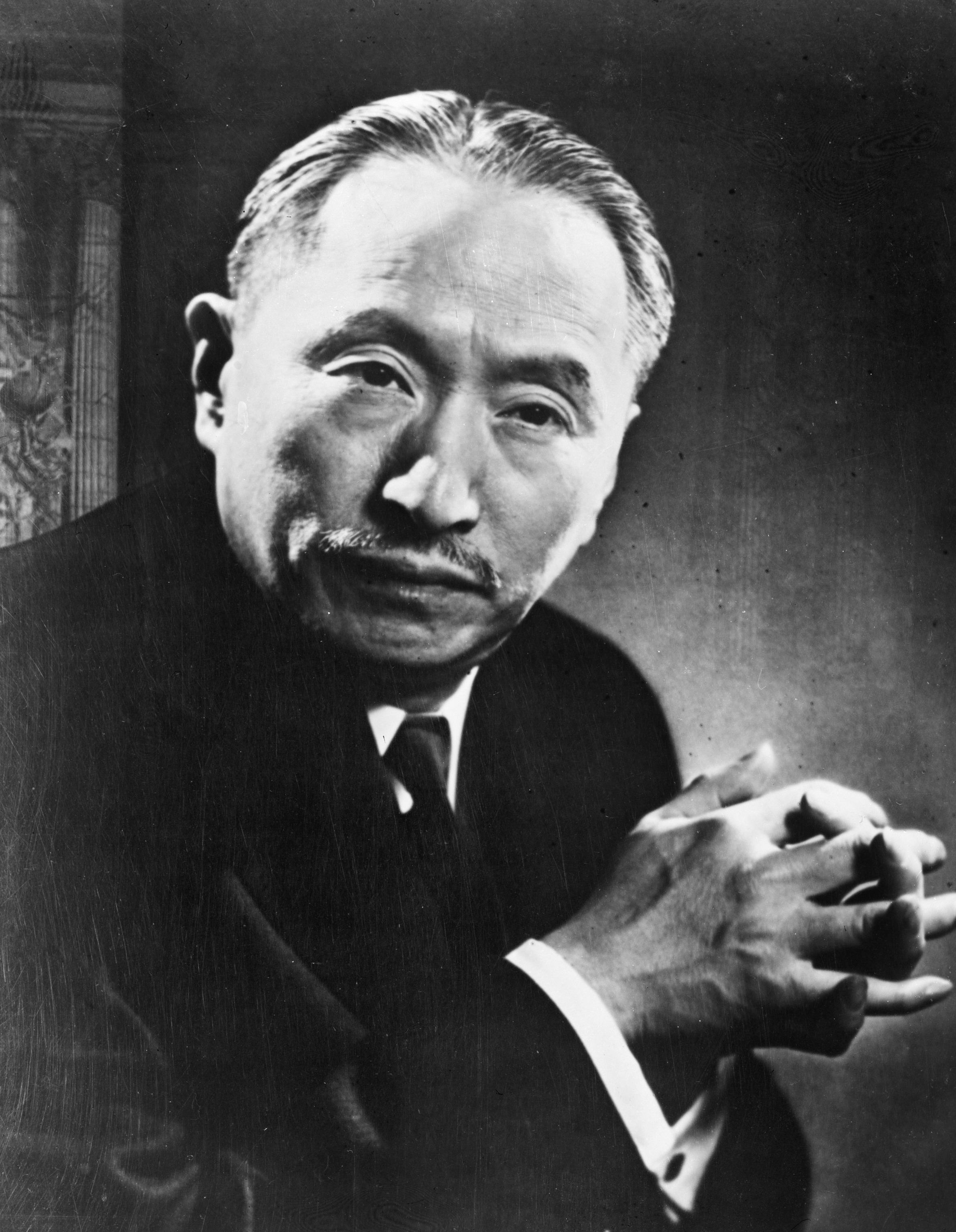
Koo in 1945

In 1941, Koo was appointed Chinese ambassador in London. He remained the Chinese ambassador to the Court of St James's until 1946. Koo decided that wartime London was too dangerous for his family to live, and sent his wife and children to New York. Madame Koo had wanted to go to London and went to New York most unwillingly. Many in the Foreign Office disliked Koo as one of Britain's "bitterest enemies" in the 1920s, charging that he was a Chinese nationalist who rejected the "white man's burden" view of Britain's role in the world. Koo's main role in London was in seeking British support for China and especially to ensure that the British did not close the Burma Road, which was China's lifeline following the closure of the French railroad to China. In July 1941, the Japanese occupied the southern half of French Indochina, giving Japan the ability to project air and naval power well into the South China Sea. In response, the American, British and Dutch governments imposed an oil embargo on Japan and froze all Japanese assets in their countries. The Foreign Secretary Anthony Eden chose not to inform Koo of these steps, who first learned of these British moves from reading the newspapers. Koo was deeply worried about a possible Japanese invasion of Burma, which would close the Burma Road. Koo pressed for more British aid to China, only to be told that the British were fully committed to the struggle against Germany and had little to spare to assist China. In the summer and fall of 1941, Koo offered to have Chinese troops sent to reinforce the garrison in Hong Kong, only to be politely rebuffed as the Foreign Office told him that the existing Anglo-Indian-Canadian garrison could hold Hong Kong against any Japanese attack.

Following the Japanese attack on the British empire in December 1941, the Japanese invaded the British colony of Burma in January 1942 from Thailand. As an ambassador in London, Koo played a critical role in the talks that saw the British grant the Chinese permission to send two armies into Burma to assist the British in the defense of Burma. The British prime minister, Winston Churchill, was opposed to accepting the Chinese offer, preferring that Burma be defended by only British troops or Indian troops under the command of British officers. Much to Koo's pleasure, the dire situation in Burma with the British being defeated by an invading Japanese force that consisted of only 2 divisions forced Churchill to accept the Chinese offer of help. For Koo, the fact that Britain was being forced to accept Chinese help symbolized how the Second World War was changing the face of world politics. However, the Chinese intervention did not stem the Japanese advance and by May 1942 the Japanese had occupied all of Burma, reaching the frontiers of India.

Koo noted that the Japanese victories in southeast Asia were further cutting off China from the rest of the world, but at least had the benefit of making British officials more respectful as he noted after the fall of Singapore, the British lost their customary disdain for Asians. The way that only four divisions of the Imperial Japanese Army who despite being outnumbered three to one by an Anglo-Indian-Australian force opposing them had been able to conquer Malaya and Singapore, billed at the time as the "Gibraltar of the East", in less than two months both astonished and shocked British officials. Koo noted that though Churchill was firmly committed to the "Europe First" strategy that the Japanese victories in southeast Asia that had pushed the Imperial Japanese Army right to the frontiers of India increased the importance of keeping China in the war. From 1937 to 1945, 38 of the 51 divisions of the Imperial Japanese Army were fighting in China with only 9 divisions being used for the conquest of southeast Asia in late 1941 and early 1942. In December 1941, the Japanese sent 1 division to conquer the British colony of Hong Kong; 4 divisions to conquer the British colonies of Malaya and Singapore; another 2 divisions to conquer the American colony of the Philippines; another 3 divisions to conquer the Dutch colony of the Netherlands East Indies (modern Indonesia); and finally assigned 2 divisions to the conquest of the British colony of Burma. The Special Landing Force of the Imperial Japanese Navy was assigned the task of taking Wake island and Guam. From the British perspective, it was crucial that the Chinese continued to fight the Japanese, which improved the Chinese bargaining position in London. Koo noted that paradoxically the Allied defeats in 1941–1942 had improved China's bargaining position as both the British and the Americans very much wanted to keep the Chinese fighting in order to keep the 38 Japanese divisions in China from being used against their forces.

Koo also pressed hard to end the 19th century "unequal treaties" and especially wanted the end of British extraterritorial rights in China. On January 11, 1943, Koo signed in London a new Sino-British treaty that saw Britain renounce all of its extraterritorial rights in China, through the British refused to return Hong Kong as the Chinese had wanted. Through Koo failed to secure the return of Hong Kong, he called the new Sino-British treaty in his diary "a really an epoch-making event—the biggest treaty in a century". In 1943, Madame Koo and her children finally arrived in London, but this time a rift had developed in the marriage as Koo was most unhappy with the ghost-written autobiography that his wife had just published prior to leaving New York.

In 1943, Chiang Kai-shek visited India, where he caused a storm in the British press by his statements in favor of Indian independence, saying he wanted to see India "free now and independent after the war". However, Chiang also voiced support for India continuing in the war as he warned that the Japanese were not liberators, and stated he envisioned a free India as an ally of China against Japan, which Chiang called a brutally imperialistic power. Chiang ordered Koo to provide him with an assessment of British public opinion regarding India. Chiang also instructed Koo that his answers to the British protests regarding his statements were to state that China wanted India to be granted Dominion status, which he believed would lead to the Indians of their own choice continuing the war. Koo reported that on the basis of statements made in the House of Commons and in the British press that only a minority in Britain favored independence for India with the majority favoring continuing the rule of the Raj after the war. Koo followed his orders by stating to British officials that China only wanted to see India to become a Dominion, and was shocked to hear various British officials insist that to give India Dominion status would lead to "twenty years of anarchy and disorder". When Koo asked why the Indians could not be trusted to govern themselves, he was told that "occidental influence had only penetrated the top strata of Indian society". The Foreign Office officials told Koo that they thought that China was suffering from a "persecution complex". Koo met Churchill at 10 Downing street, where he found the prime minister to be "a little peeved and sullen". Churchill told Koo that "the British were not decadent and defeatist" as was being said in the Chinese newspapers, and then returned to a genial mood.

In late July 1943, the Chinese Foreign Minister, T. V. Soong, visited London, where he met with Eden and Koo to discuss plans for a British offensive from India into Burma with the aim of reopening the Burma Road. Soong reported to Chiang that based on his talks with Eden and Koo that the British did not regard China as a serious military power and that Churchill was far interested in the war against Germany than with Japan. Soong's assumptions were proved correct when he met with Churchill on August 4, 1943. Churchill listed a number of ways to defeat Japan such as a strategical bombing offensive, having the Soviet Union declare war on Japan, invading Japan via the Aleutian islands, and an offensive by the Chinese, but notably did not mention any offensive into Burma. After the Cairo conference of 1943, Eden told Koo that he rather liked Chiang and his American-educated wife, Soong Mei-ling, who served as his translator as Chiang only spoke Mandarin. Koo reported to Chongqing that Eden was the only member of the British cabinet who was sympathetic towards China, and expressed regret that Eden was not the prime minister, writing that Anglo-Chinese relations would be much better if Eden instead of Churchill were the prime minister. Wang Shih-chieh, a member of Chiang's staff, told Koo after the Cairo conference that Chiang and Churchill disliked each other, and Roosevelt was forced to play the peace-maker. Eden told Koo that Churchill had tried to explain British grand strategy to Chiang as he maintained that the British were committed to defeating Japan, but had to devote most of their resources towards the war against Germany as the British were fighting in Italy and were due to take part in an invasion of France the next year. Most notably, Churchill had changed his position, agreeing that the Anglo-Indian-African 14th Army would launch an offensive into Burma in 1944, but Chiang continued to mistrust him, believing that Churchill was not being sincere.

Unlike Chiang, who had a deep mistrust of Britain, Koo favored an Anglo-Chinese alliance after the war, preferably with the United States also joining. During a visit to China in 1943, Koo told Chiang that Churchill was strongly anti-communist and did not expect the wartime alliance with Soviet Union to continue after the war. Koo stated he felt with the long-standing vexatious issue of extraterritorial rights finally settled in China's favor, it would be possible to make an alliance with the United Kingdom against the Soviet Union after the war. Chiang was opposed to Koo's ideas, believing that such an alliance would limit his ability to deal with the Soviets by committing China to a rigidly anti-Soviet line, and would only agree to such an alliance if the United States also joined in, which he thought was unlikely. Chiang expected the United States to return to isolationism after the war, just as it had done after the First World War. Chiang told Koo that "English diplomacy" was "shrewd and cunning" and that British would "adhere stubbornly to their traditional policies".

In the summer of 1944, Koo was contacted by agents of Charles de Gaulle, who wanted an agreement that China would support restoration of French rule in Indochina after the war. Koo advised Chiang to accept the French offer, stating that France would probably become a major power again after the war.

== At the United Nations ==
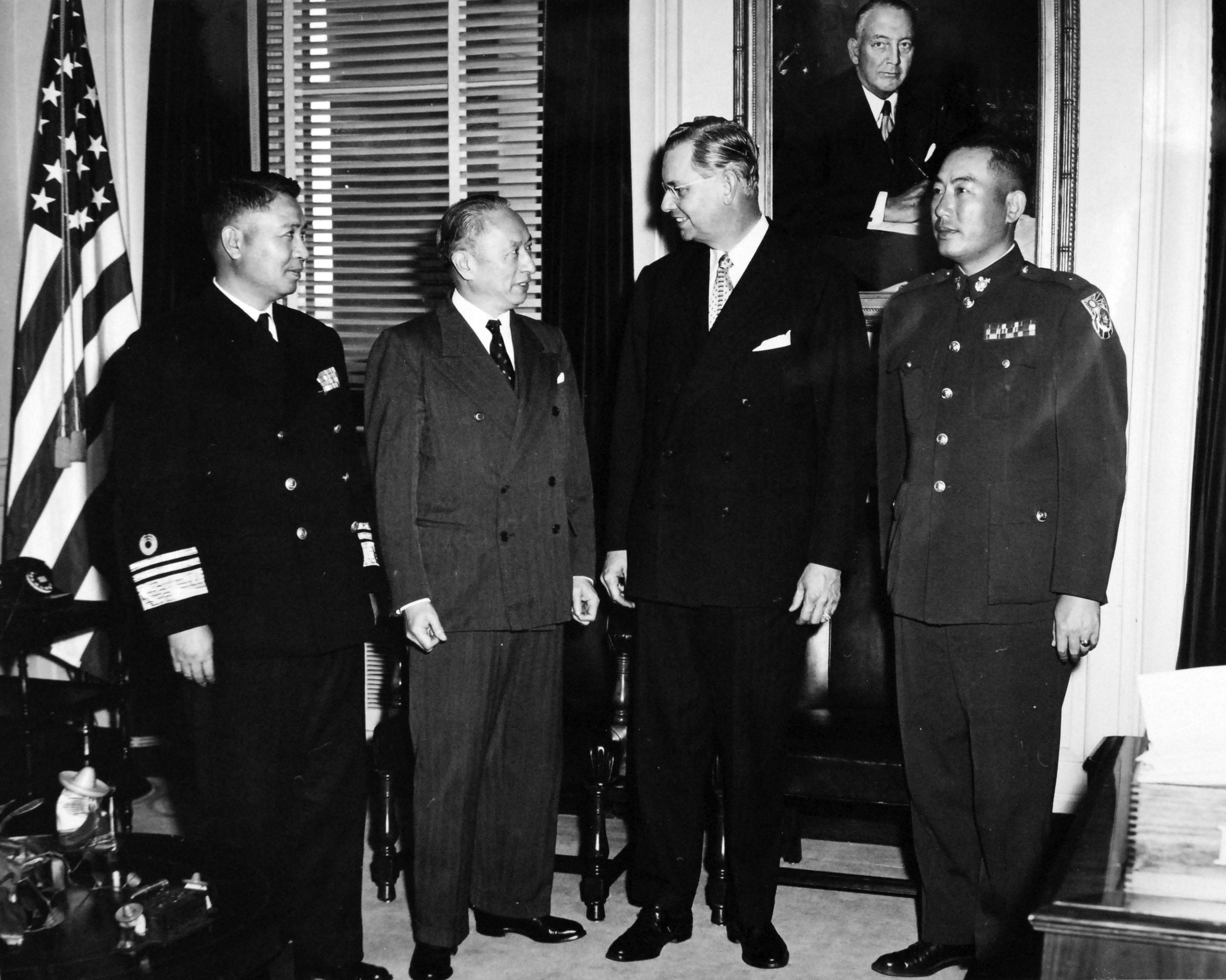
Koo (second from left) in Washington, DC, as Ambassador to the United States, 1953

In 1945, Koo was one of the founding delegates of the United Nations, and the first signer of the United Nations Charter. He later became the Chinese Ambassador to the United States and focused on maintaining the alliance between the Republic of China and the United States as the Kuomintang began losing to the Communists and had to retreat to Taiwan.

Koo retired from the Chinese diplomatic service in 1956. and in the same year he became a judge of the International Court of Justice in The Hague, and served as vice-president of the Court during the final three years of his term. In 1967, he retired and moved to New York City, where he lived until his death in 1985.

In an interview conducted in 1969 on the 50th anniversary of the Treaty of Versailles, Koo stated that the Paris peace conference, which launched the May 4 movement, was a turning point in Chinese views of the West as he observed that many Chinese intellectuals believed the victorious powers of 1918 would allow China to be treated as an equal, and the outcome of the Paris peace conference had turned public opinion against the Western powers. There was a widespread feeling in China that given the suffering of the Chinese coolies on the Western Front that France, Great Britain and the United States would reward China for its sacrifices. Koo stated: "Looking back at China's stand at the Paris peace conference and the developments preceding, it appears that these events are...a turning point in China's history, both from the domestic and international point of view...One could wonder what would be the situation in China [today] either if China had succeeded in settling the Shandong question in Paris to her satisfaction or if she had signed the treaty without the reservation. These are questions which probably can never be fully answered now". Koo noted that the new Communist government in Russia, which denounced liberalism as a device for Western imperialism and renounced all of the special Russian rights in China gained under the Tsarist regime, won tremendous prestige in China as the one power that seemed willing to treat China as an equal, which led directly to the founding of the Chinese Communist Party in 1920.

== Personal life ==
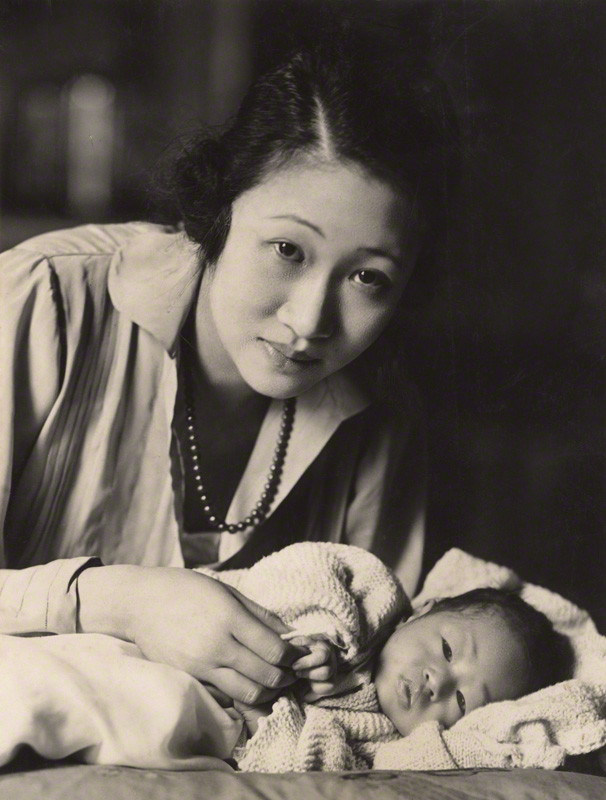
Madame Wellington Koo (née Hui-lan Oei) in 1922 with son Yu-chang Wellington Koo Jr.; photographed by Henry Walter Barnett

In 1908, Koo married his first wife, Chang Jun-o (traditional Chinese: 張潤娥; simplified Chinese: 张润娥; pinyin: Zhāng Rùn'é). They divorced in 1912.

Koo's second wife, Tang Pao-yueh "May" (唐寶玥; 唐宝玥; Táng Bǎoyuè; c. 1895–1918), was one of the illegitimate daughters of the former Chinese prime minister Tang Shaoyi and a concubine Mai-Mai Sze. Their marriage took place soon after Koo's return to China and divorced his first wife in 1912. She died in the U.S. during the 1918 Spanish flu pandemic. They had two children: a son, Teh-chang Koo (1916–1998), and a daughter, Patricia Tsien (1918–2015).

Koo's third wife was the socialite and style icon Oei Hui-lan (1889–1992). She married Koo in Brussels, Belgium, in 1921. She was previously married, in 1909, to British consular agent Beauchamp Stoker, by whom she had one son, Lionel, before divorcing in 1920. Much admired for her adaptations of traditional Manchu fashion, which she wore with lace trousers and jade necklaces, Oei Hui-lan was the favorite daughter of Peranakan tycoon Majoor Oei Tiong Ham, and the heiress of a prominent family of the Cabang Atas or the Chinese gentry of colonial Indonesia. She wrote two memoirs: Hui-Lan Koo (Mrs. Wellington Koo): An Autobiography (written with Mary Van Rensselaer Thayer, Dial Press, 1943) and No Feast Lasts Forever (written with Isabella Taves, Quadrangle/The New York Times, 1975). Koo had two sons with her: Yu-chang Wellington Koo Jr. (1922–1975) and Fu-chang Freeman Koo (1923–1977).

On September 3, 1959, Koo married his fourth wife Yen Yu-yun (1905–2017), the widow of Clarence Kuangson Young, who had been his long-term mistress since the 1930s while her husband was still alive. He had three stepdaughters from this marriage: Genevieve (wife of American photographer and film director Gordon Parks), Shirley, and Frances Loretta Young (wife of Oscar Tang).

== Death and legacy ==
Though he outlived two of his sons, Koo died surrounded by his family on the night of November 14, 1985, aged 97. Wellington Koo was survived by his fourth wife, two children, nineteen grandchildren and two great-grandchildren.

Dying older than the 87-year-old Qianlong Emperor, the 87-year-old Republic of China President Chiang Kai-shek, the 92-year-old People's Republic paramount leader Deng Xiaoping, and the 96-year-old People's Republic paramount leader Jiang Zemin, Koo holds the distinction of being the longest-lived person to ever lead China. Despite this, both his third and fourth wives lived even longer than he did—Oei Hui-lan died at the age 103 and Juliana Koo died aged 111.

Political offices
Preceded by Sun Baoqi	Premier of China; 1924	Succeeded by Yan Huiqing
Preceded by Du Xigui	President of China; 1926–1927	Succeeded by Zhang Zuolin as Generalissimo of the Military Government
Preceded by Du Xigui	Premier of China; 1926–1927	Succeeded by Pan Fu
Diplomatic posts
Preceded by Wei Tao-ming	Ambassador of China to the United States; 1946–1956	Succeeded by Hollington Tong
