= James R. Rush =

American historian

James Robert Rush is an American historian and professor of history at Arizona State University. He studied modern Southeast Asian history at Yale University and obtained his PhD in 1977. Rush is a scholar of modern Southeast Asia. He has served as director of Arizona State University's Program for Southeast Asian Studies and as faculty head of history at the university. As a consultant, Rush worked with the Rockefeller Brothers Fund, The Asia Society, and El Colegio de México.

== Selected works ==
Rush's scholarship addresses issues of colonialism and religion in Indonesia during the nineteenth and the twentieth century. From 1987 to 2008 Rush also led the biography project of the Ramon Magsaysay Award Foundation in Manila, Philippines. In connection with this project, Rush conducted interviews with more than one hundred awardees, and edited seven volumes of biographical essays. Rush's own essays in the Ramon Magsaysay Award series include Pramoedya Ananta Toer, Abdurrahman Wahid, Bienvenido Lumbera, Ravi Shankar, Veditantirige Ediriwira Sarachchandra, and Fei Xiaotong. Rush's books include the following:

- Southeast Asia: A Very Short Introduction (Oxford University Press, 2018). According to WorldCat, the book is in 172 libraries
- Hamka's Great Story: A Master Writer's Vision of Islam for Modern Indonesia (University of Wisconsin Press, 2016) According to WorldCat, in 554 libraries
- Opium to Java: Revenue Farming and Chinese Enterprise in Colonial Indonesia, 1860–1910 (Cornell University Press, 1990), 1990/2007) According to WorldCat, in 284 libraries
  - Translated into Indonesian by Tasha Agrippina as Candu tempo doeloe : pemerintah, pengedar dan pecandu, 1860–1910
- Java: A Travellers' Anthology (Oxford University Press, 1996) According to WorldCat, in 93 libraries
  - Translated into Indonesian by Maria Agustina as Jawa tempo doeloe : 650 tahun bertemu dunia barat : 1330–1985
- The Last Tree: Reclaiming the Environment in Tropical Asia ( Westview Press, 1991) According to WorldCat, in 318 libraries
- Asia in Western Fiction (with Robin W. Winks) (University of Hawaii Press, 1989) According to WorldCat, in 475 libraries
