= Sam Poo Kong =

Gedung Batu Temple

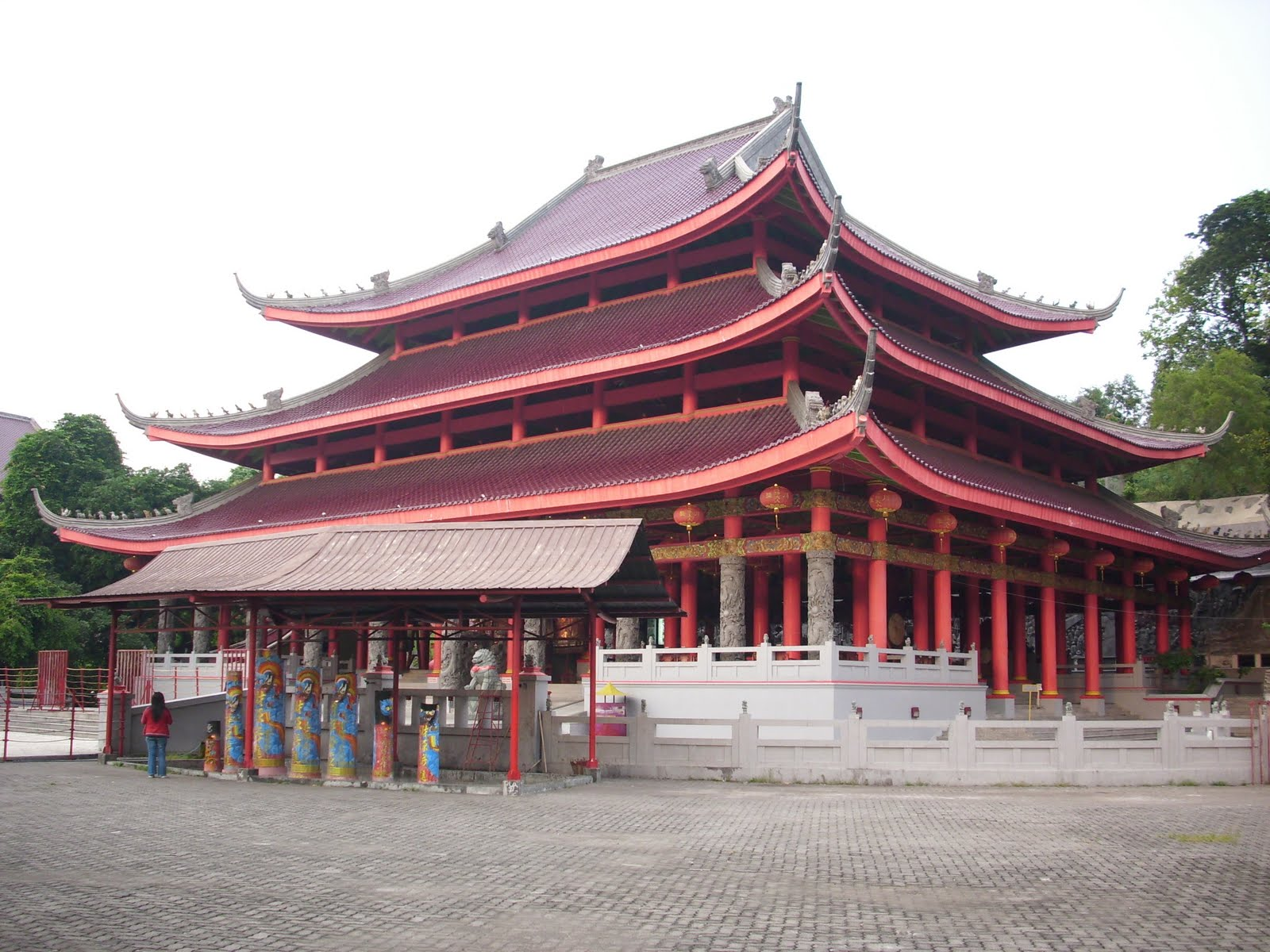

- Location within Semarang
- Alternative names: Gedung Batu Temple

General information
- Type: Chinese temple
- Architectural style: Mix of traditional Chinese and Javanese
- Location: Semarang, Indonesia
- Coordinates: 6°59′47″S 110°23′53″E
- Groundbreaking: c. 1400 – 1416
- Renovated: Numerous
- Owner: Sam Poo Kong Foundation

Sam Poo Kong (Chinese: 三保洞; pinyin: Sānbǎo Dòng), also known as Gedung Batu Temple, is the oldest Chinese temple in Semarang, Central Java, Indonesia. Originally established by the Chinese explorer Zheng He (also known as Ma Sanbao), it is now shared by Indonesians of multiple religious denominations, including Muslims and Buddhists, and ethnicities, including Chinese and Javanese.

== History ==
The foundations of Sam Poo Kong were set when Chinese Muslim explorer Admiral Zheng He arrived in the western part of what is now Semarang via the Garang River; the year is disputed, with suggestions ranging from 1400 to 1416. After disembarking from his ships, Zheng found a cave in a rocky hillside and used it for prayer. He established a small temple before leaving Java but, having grown fond of the area, his deputy Wang Jing and several crewmen remained behind. A statuette of Zheng was installed in the cave.

The original temple was reportedly destroyed in 1704, collapsing under a landslide. In October 1724 the temple was completely renovated. A new cave was made, next to the old one.

In the middle of the 1800s Sam Poo Kong was owned by a Mr. Johanes, a landlord of Jewish descent, who charged devotees for the right to pray at the temple. Unable to pay individual fees, the Chinese community spent 2000 gulden yearly to keep the temple open; this was later reduced to 500 gulden after worshipers complained of the expense. As this was still a heavy burden, devotees abandoned Sam Poo Kong and found a statue of Zheng He to bring to Tay Kak Sie Temple, 5 kilometres (3.1 mi) away, where they could pray freely.

In 1879, Oei Tjie Sien, a prominent local businessman, bought the Sam Poo Kong complex and made its use free of charge; in response, local Chinese celebrated by holding a carnival and began returning to Sam Poo Kong. The temple's ownership was transferred to the recently founded Sam Poo Kong foundation in 1924.

The temple received another full renovation in 1937. After the Japanese invasion of the Indies, the Japanese command installed electricity and provided the temple with a framed written appraisal for Zheng He. During five years of revolution after the Japanese left the newly independent Indonesia, the temple was poorly maintained and fell into disrepair.

In 1950, Sam Poo Kong was again renovated. However, beginning in the 1960s increased political instability led to its being neglected again. From 2002 to 2005 it underwent another major renovation.

== Layout ==
The Sam Poo Kong complex includes five temples in a mixed Chinese and Javanese architectural style. The temples are Sam Poo Kong (the oldest), Tho Tee Kong, Kyai Juru Mudi Temple, Kyai Jangkar Temple, and Kyai Cundrik Bumi Temple. An additional worship site, Mbah Kyai Tumpeng, is in the complex. The buildings are spread over 3.2 hectares (7.9 acres).

Tho Tee Kong (also known as Dewa Bumi Temple), is just within the large gate at the northern end of the complex; it is used by those who seek the blessings of the earth god Tu Di Gong. Next to Tho Tee Kong is Kyai Juru Mudi Temple, the burial site of Wang Jing Hong, one of Zheng He's deputies. It is often frequented by people looking for success in business.

The main temple is built directly in front of the cave, south of Kyai Juru Mudi. In the cave are an altar, fortune-telling equipment, and a small statue of Zheng He. Underneath the altar is a well that is said to never go dry and to be capable of healing various ailments. Before the 2002 renovations, the temple measured 16 by 16 metres (52 by 52 ft). It now measures 34 by 34 metres (112 by 112 ft).

Further south is the Kyai Jankar Temple, named after a sacred anchor used by Zheng He which is held inside. The temple contains an altar to Zheng's crewmen who died while fulfilling their duties. The southernmost temple is Kyai Cundrik Bumi, which is used to worship a weapon used by Zheng. Nearby is Mbah Kyai Tumpeng, a prayer site used by people wishing for their well-being.

The main temple (left), Kyai Juru Mudi Temple (center), and Tho Tee Kong (right)

== Carnival ==
Every lunar year on the 30th day of the sixth month, the anniversary of Zheng He's arrival in Semarang, Chinese Indonesians parade statues of Zheng He, Lauw In, and Thio Ke from Tay Kak Sie to Sam Poo Kong. Started after Sam Poo Kong again became free to use, the carnival is meant to show respect to the explorers.

== Entertainment events ==
- 1 September 2019 - Westlife - The Twenty Tour

== See also ==
- Kim Tek Ie Temple (金德院), Jakarta
- Vihara Bahtera Bhakti (安卒大伯公廟), Jakarta
- Boen Tek Bio (文德廟), Tangerang
- Tay Kak Sie Temple (大覺寺), Semarang
- Sanggar Agung (宏善堂), Surabaya
- Hoo Ann Kiong Temple (護安宮), Riau
- Ban Hin Kiong Temple (萬興宮), Manado
- Gunung Timur Temple (東嶽觀), Medan
- Satya Dharma Temple (保安宮), Bali
