= List of places of worship in Tangerang =

This list consists of several houses of worship in Greater Tangerang, Indonesia.

== Muslim ==
=== Mosque ===
- Al-Azhom Grand Mosque
- Al - Ittihad Grand Mosque
- Pintu Seribu Mosque
- Al Furqon Mosque, Soekarno Hatta International Airport
- Al Muhajirin Mosque, Taman Cibodas
- Kali Pasir Mosque

== Christian ==
=== Protestant churches ===
- GKI Gading Serpong Tangerang
- Bakal Pos Foresta (together with *GKI Serpong)
- GKI Sutopo Tangerang
- Bajem Curug Congregation
- Tigaraksa Post
- GKI Perumnas Tangerang
- Bajem Kutabumi congregation
- GKI Pondok Makmur Tangerang
- GKI Martadinata Tangerang
- GKI Griya Merpati Mas Tangerang
- GKI Kosambi Timur Tangerang
- GKI Villa Melati Mas Tangerang
- Christ Cathedral
- GPdI Taman Cibodas Tangerang
- SWAT GPKdI Taman Cibodas
- GKRI Shalom Taman Cibodas
- FLC Taman Cibodas
- GBI Nelayan Taman Cibodas
- GBI ROCK Niaga Cibodas
- HKBP Rogate
- GKY Gerendeng
- GKY Cimone
- GKY Villa Tangerang Indah

=== Catholic churches ===
- St. Augustine Catholic Church, Karawaci

Immaculate Heart of the Blessed Virgin Mary Catholic Church

=== Orthodox churches ===
- Indonesian Orthodox Church, Parokia Js. Peter and Paul

== Hindu ==
=== Pura ===
- Pura Kerta Jaya Tangerang

=== Temple ===
- Temple of the Goddess Durga Maa Tangerang
- Shri Bathra Kali Amman Temple

== Buddhist ==
=== Vihara ===
- Punna Sampada Vihara Taman Cibodas
- Chi San Bio Temple, Taman Cibodas
- Padumuttara Vihara
- Boen San Bio Temple
- Dhammaphala Temple
- Amaravati Temple
- Budhi Bhakti Dhamma Temple

== Confucian ==
=== Temple ===
- Boen Tek Bio Temple
