= 金德 =

金德 or 金徳, meaning "gold, moral", may refer to:

- Kim Duk (김덕; born 1948), a retired Korean professional wrestler
- Chen Chin-te (陳金德; born 1961), a Taiwanese politician

== See also ==
- The dictionary definition of 金 at Wiktionary
- The dictionary definition of 德 at Wiktionary
- The dictionary definition of 徳 at Wiktionary
- Kim Tek Ie Temple, in the China Town neighborhood of Glodok, Jakarta, Indonesia
