= Tay Kak Sie Temple =

Taoist temple

- 大覺寺; Kelenteng Tay Kak Sie
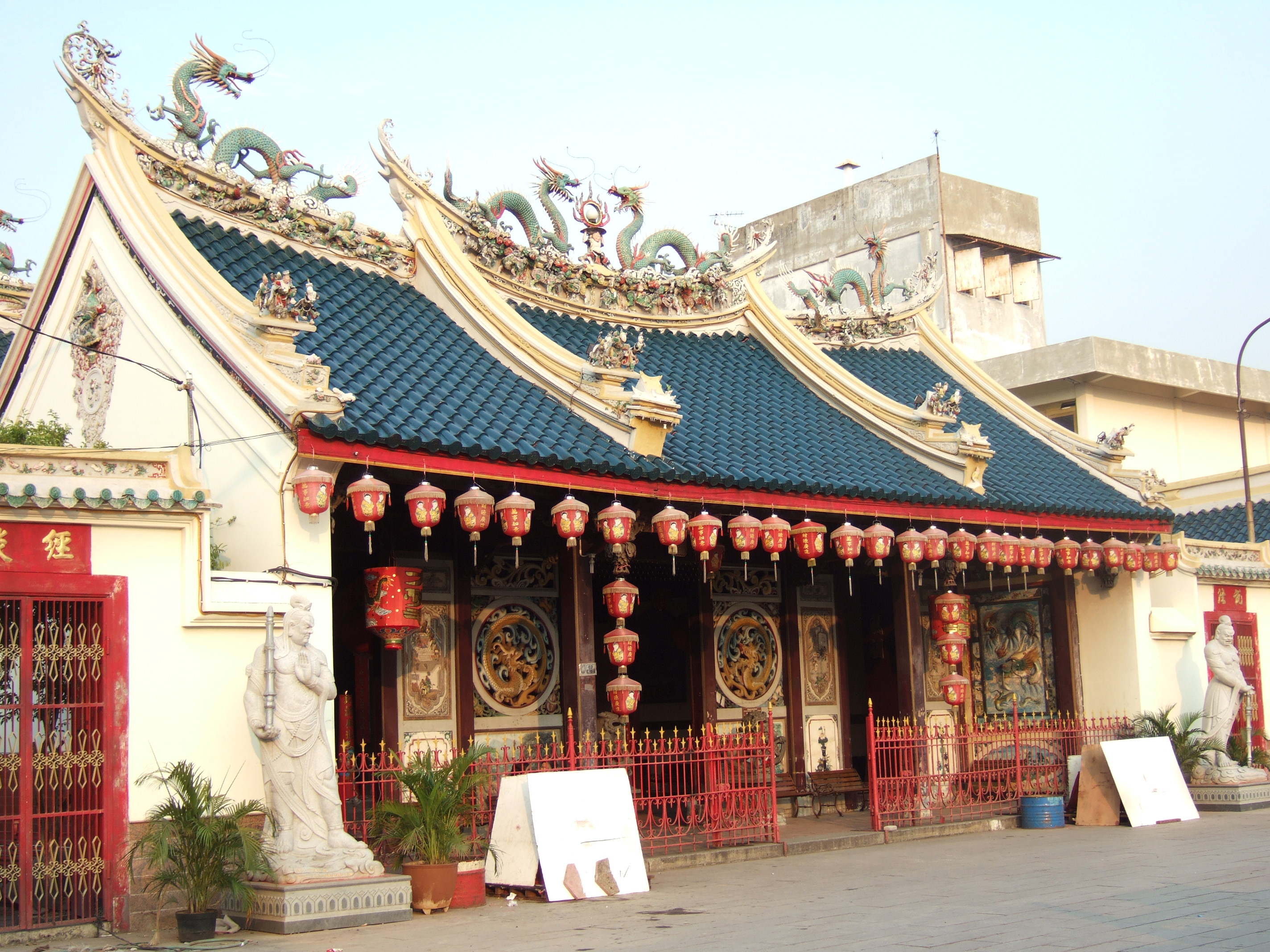
- Front view of the temple

- Location in Semarang

Religion
- Affiliation: Taoism
- Province: Central Java

Location
- Location: Semarang, Indonesia
- Country: Indonesia
- Interactive map of Tay Kak Sie Temple
- Coordinates: 6.974159°S 110.427897°E

Architecture
- Type: Chinese
- Established: 1746

Tay Kak Sie Temple (simplified Chinese: 大觉寺; traditional Chinese: 大覺寺; pinyin: Dà jué sì) is a Taoist temple located at Jalan Gang Lombok, Semarang. The temple was established in 1746. This was originally only to worship the goddess of mercy, Guan Yin. This pagoda later developed into a large temple which also worshipped many Taoist deities.

Tay Kak Sie name written on the signboard at the entrance of a large temple, with the record year of the reign of Emperor Dao Guang (Too Kong in the Hokkien language) 1821-1850 of the Qing dynasty is a name that means "Temple of Supreme Consciousness". The temple features a replica of the ship of Navy Admiral Zheng He and his statue.

== List of deities ==
Tay Kak Sie pagoda has a host of deities and the main deity is the goddess Kwan Im Pho Sat. Moreover, Tay Kak Sie temple is the largest temple (in the sense of many deities) in the city of Semarang. Deities worshiped in this temple include:

- Sam Koan Tay Te (三官大帝)
- Sam Po Hud (三寶佛：Sakia Mo Ni Hud, O Mi To Hud, Yo Su Hud)
- Thian Siang Seng Boo (天上聖母) / Tian Shang Sheng Mu
- Sam Po Tay Jin (Sam Po Kong)
- Cap Pwee Lo Han (十八羅漢)
- Po Seng Tay Te Seng Tay Te (保生大帝)
- Seng Hong Lo Ya Hong Lo Ya (城隍老爺)
- Kong Tik Cun Ong (廣澤尊王)
- Te Cong Po Sat (地藏菩薩)

== See also ==
- Kim Tek Ie Temple (金德院), Jakarta
- Vihara Bahtera Bhakti (安卒大伯公廟), Jakarta
- Boen Tek Bio (文德廟), Tangerang
- Sam Poo Kong (三保洞), Semarang
- Sanggar Agung (宏善堂), Surabaya
- Hoo Ann Kiong Temple (護安宮), Riau
- Ban Hin Kiong Temple (萬興宮), Manado
- Gunung Timur Temple (東嶽觀), Medan
- Satya Dharma Temple (保安宮), Bali
