= Vihara Bahtera Bhakti =

Taoist temple in Jakarta, Indonesia

Coordinates: 6.120324°S 106.853891°E

Vihara Bahtera Bakti
- Klenteng Ancol
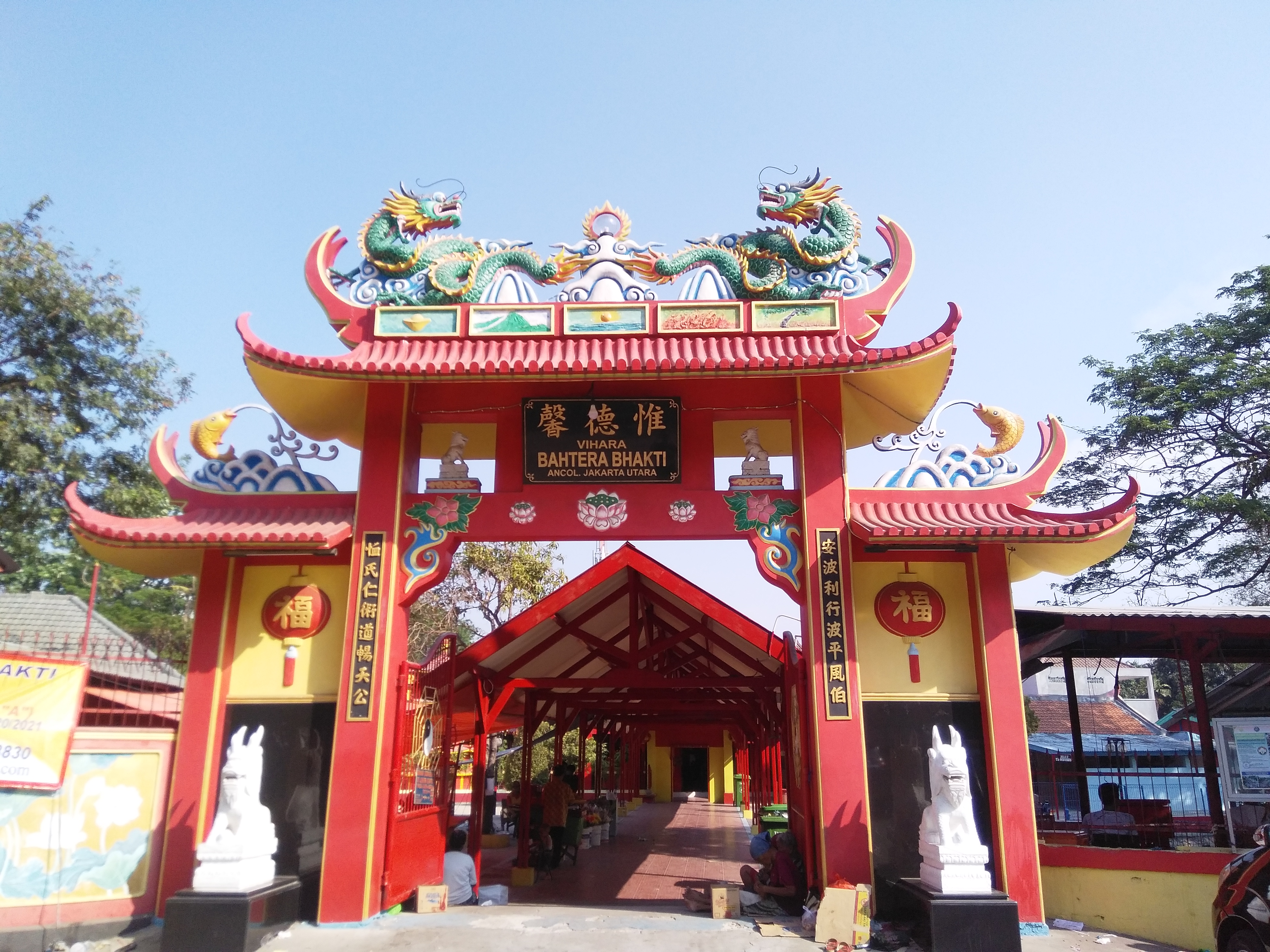
- Shrine's gate

- Location within Jakarta

Religion
- Affiliation: Taoism, Chinese folk religion

Location
- Location: Jalan Pantai Sanur No. 5 Binaria Ancol, North Jakarta
- Country: Indonesia
- Interactive map of Vihara Bahtera Bakti

Architecture
- Completed: 1650

Vihara Bahtera Bhakti (Chinese: 安卒大伯公廟 ) is a Taoist temple located in Jakarta, Indonesia. The Chinese shrine, or klenteng, is located in the neighborhood of Ancol, hence it is more popularly known as Klenteng Ancol. It is dedicated to Da Bo Gong, a deity of land and wealth, and his wife. Established around 1650, it is one of the oldest Taoist temples in Jakarta.

== Description ==
The temple is also known as Anxu Da-bo-gong Miao, "a place of worshipping Da Bo Gong". It is dedicated to Da Bo Gong (Hokkien Tua Pek Kong), a deity of land and wealth, and his wife Bo Pog. Da Bo Gong is identical with Fu-de zheng-shen, "God of the Earth and Riches" worshipped at Kim Tek Ie in Glodok.

The temple is also dedicated to the Muslim cook of Cheng Ho, Sampo Soei Soe.

The Hokkien name for Da Bo Gong, Toa Pe Kong gives name to an Indonesian term for statues of Chinese deities, the topekong.

== History ==
The temple was established ca. 1650 under the name Taipekong or Da Bo Gong Temple on the area of Slingerland, to the east side of Ancol River. As a Chinese temple near Ancol River, it is also known as Klenteng Ancol.

== Shrine complex ==
The shrine complex consists of a main building which houses the Main Sanctuary, as well as other rooms e.g. the House of Guardian and the Sanctuary of Buddha.

The main sanctuary of the Ancol Chinese Temple is dedicated to Da-bo-gong and his wife Bo-pog, both can be regarded as a projection of the couple buried in the sanctuary. The main sanctuary houses three altars. At the center is an altar with statues of the couple Sampo Soeisoe ("Sanbao (honorary title) Helmsman") and his wife Ibu Sitiwati ("Madam Sitiwati"). Sampoe Soeisoe is supposed to be identical with Wang Zschu-cheng (also Wang Ching-hung), a Muslims helmsman of Admiral Zheng He who was left behind in Java and founded the shrine of Da-bo-gong. To the left is an altar with statues of San-bao daren and his wife Ibu Mone ("Madam Mone", the younger sister of Sitiwati). To the right is the tomb of Kong Toe-Tjoe-Seng. Admiral Zheng He was known in Indonesia as Sampo Toa-lang or Sampo Tai-jin and has a temple dedicated in Semarang, the Sampo Kong, the largest Chinese temple of Semarang.

Behind the main building is the tomb of Embah Said Areli Dato Kembang.

The architecture of the temple is Chinese-Buddhist architecture with a style that is specifically associated with a holy Muslim tomb because it is a shrine for a Muslim.

== See also ==
- Kim Tek Ie Temple (金德院), Jakarta
- Boen Tek Bio (文德廟), Tangerang
- Tay Kak Sie Temple (大覺寺), Semarang
- Sanggar Agung (宏善堂), Surabaya
- Hoo Ann Kiong Temple (護安宮), Riau
- Ban Hin Kiong Temple (萬興宮), Manado
- Gunung Timur Temple (東嶽觀), Medan
- Satya Dharma Temple (保安宮), Bali

== Works cited ==
- Heuken, Adolf (2007). Historical Sites of Jakarta. Cipta Loka Caraka.
