= Hoo Ann Kiong Temple =

Chinese Taoism temple in Indonesia

Hoo Ann Kiong Temple Vihara Sejahtera Sakti
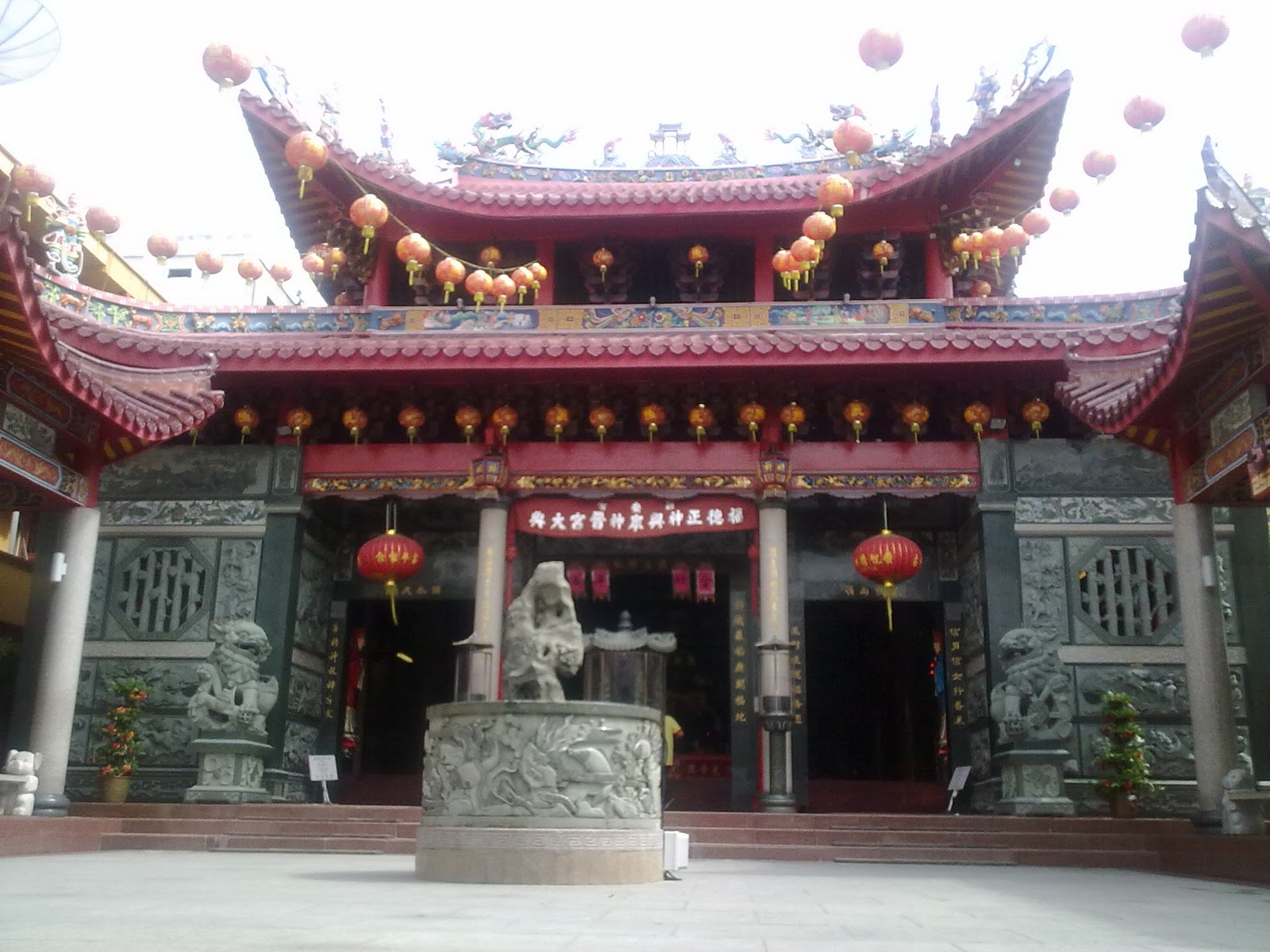

Religion
- Affiliation: Taoism
- Province: Riau

Location
- Location: Jalan Jenderal Ahmad Yani, Selat Panjang; Indonesia

Architecture
- Style: Chinese
- Groundbreaking: 1868

Hoo Ann Kiong Temple (simplified Chinese: 护安宫; traditional Chinese: 護安宮; pinyin: Hù ān gōng, known as Vihara Sejahtera Sakti in Indonesian) is the oldest Chinese Taoism temple in Selat Panjang. This temple is the oldest in Riau province and on Jalan Ahmad Yani, Selat Panjang, Riau. It is one of the cultural heritage assets of the Meranti Islands Regency.

== History ==
Hoo Ann Kiong Temple was built in the Dutch colonial period. It is not known with certainty when the founding year was. It is estimated that the temple was established in early 1868. Historians estimate this temple is more than 150 years old as seen from its relief architecture.

The initial establishment of this building was a simple hut built by overseas Chinese who settled in the city Selatpanjang the Dutch colonial period. The purpose of the establishment of this temple was to honor the god of the earth who is more widely known by the Chinese community as Tua Pek Kong (大伯公) or Fu De Zheng Shen (福德正神).

Hoo Ann Kiong temple was re-constructed several times, namely in the years 1903, 1940, and in 1948. Recently restored, the temple is almost completed except the front of the main gate in 2005 and total completion in 2008.

== See also ==
- Kim Tek Ie Temple (金德院), Jakarta
- Vihara Bahtera Bhakti (安卒大伯公廟), Jakarta
- Boen Tek Bio (文德廟), Tangerang
- Tay Kak Sie Temple (大覺寺), Semarang
- Sanggar Agung (宏善堂), Surabaya
- Ban Hin Kiong Temple (萬興宮), Manado
- Gunung Timur Temple (東嶽觀), Medan
- Satya Dharma Temple (保安宮), Bali
