= Satya Dharma Temple =

Vihara Satya Dharma
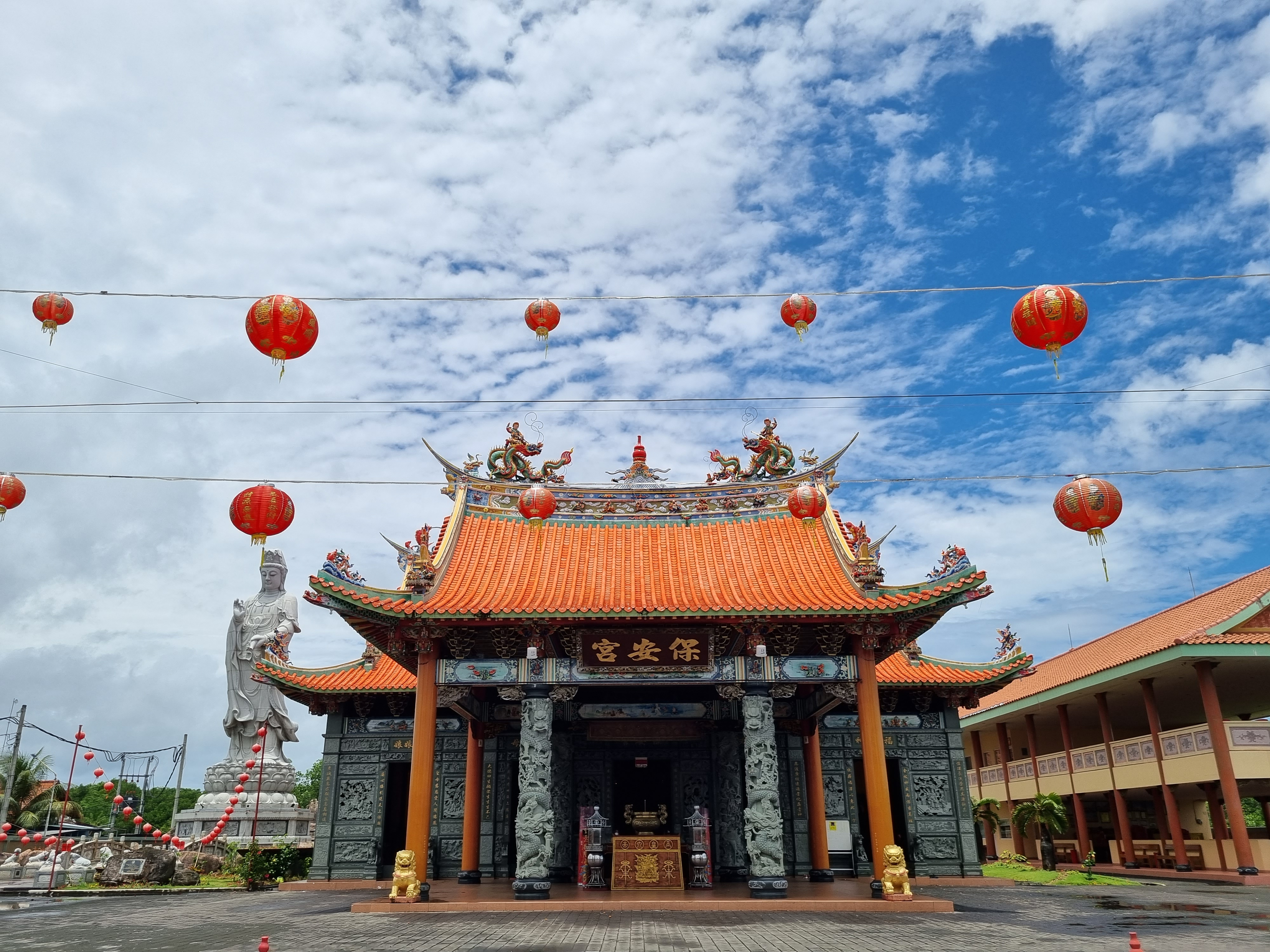
- View of Temple
- Interactive map of the Vihara Satya Dharma area

General information
- Type: Chinese temple
- Architectural style: Chinese style
- Location: Benoa, South Kuta, Badung, Bali, Indonesia, Pelabuhan Benoa Street 108, Benoa, Bali
- Construction started: 2006
- Completed: 2012
- Inaugurated: Wednesday, August 15th 2012
- Cost: 3-4 Billions Rupiah

Dimensions
- Other dimensions: Building 800 m^{2} Area 8200 m^{2}

Technical details
- Floor count: 1 floor

Vihara Satya Dharma (Chinese: 保安宮) is a modern Chinese temple at Benoa Port, Bali. It is a temple of the Three teachings ("Tridharma") of Chinese folk religion, i.e. Buddhism, Taoism, and Confucianism. Furthermore, like the other Chinese temples in Bali, this temple also has an altar in its outdoor yard dedicated to Gods of Balinese Hinduism.

The main deity of this temple is Tian Shang Sheng Mu, the Goddess who can calm the sea and ensure the safety of those travelling across the seas. As a temple which is built in the international port area, this temple worships the Deities of travel safety, sailing, and business. This is the first Chinese temple in Benoa Port thus is expected to be a worship place for the sailors from various countries and also as a tourist attraction.

== Naming ==
"Satya Dharma" (Sanskrit) means "True Law". "Vihara" is a Sanskrit term traditionally used for Buddhist temples in Southeast Asia, but it is also used occasionally for Chinese temples, otherwise called klenteng, since the New Order dispositions. Even though Confucianism has recently been accepted as a legal religion in Indonesia, many new Chinese temples in Bali still use the term "vihara" in their names.

"Vihara Satya Dharma" is translated in Chinese characters as 宮安保, from the right to the left readable as bǎo ān gōng. 保 (bǎo) means "to protect" while 安 (ān) means "content, quiet, peace", thus 安保 (ānbǎo) means "to maintain security". The 宮 (gōng) character means "temple, palace". Literally, Bao An Gong means the "Temple to Maintain Security". It is a common term for any Chinese temples in Indonesia which intends the safety of its followers, especially in the spiritual meaning.

== History ==
Vihara Satya Dharma is located at the north end of Benoa Port Highway. The temple foundation got the construction fund from the donation of worshippers from Indonesia especially Bali, even from Japanese, Taiwanese and Thai sailors. The construction lasted for 6 years until it was inaugurated in 2012. The inauguration celebration was held on 22 August 2012 and was attended by the Deputy Governor of Bali, i.e. AA Ngurah Puspayoga.

== Altars ==
Number	Sing Bing (Deity)	Location	Information
	Thian Kong	Terrace
01	Chie Ong Ya, Na Cha, Siong Ti Kong	The main front room (middle room)	Middle altar
02	Kwan Kong	The main front room (middle room)	Left altar
03	Ma Cho	The main front room (middle room)	Right altar
	Ngo Yia Ciong Kun	Right wing
01	Kwan Im Put Co	The main back room (middle room)	Middle altar
02	Thai Sue Ya	The main back room (middle room)	Left altar
03	Seng Ong Ya	The main back room (middle room)	Right altar
04-05	Toa Ya Pe dan Ji Ya Pe	The main back room (middle room)	Flank Seng Ong Ya
01	Toa Pe Kong	Left wing back room	Middle altar
02	Te Con Ong Po Sat	Left wing back room	Left altar
03	Cin Cui Co Se	Left wing back room	Right altar
04	Tei Ki Co	Left wing back room	Under Te Con Ong Po Sat
05	Pei Ho Ciong Kun	Left wing back room	Under Cin Cui Co Se
01	Cu Seng Nian Nian	Right wing back room	Middle altar
02	Ong Ya Kong	Right wing back room	Left altar
03	Niu Niu (女娘娘)	Right wing back room	Right altar
	令	Front yard	Under the flags

== Gallery ==
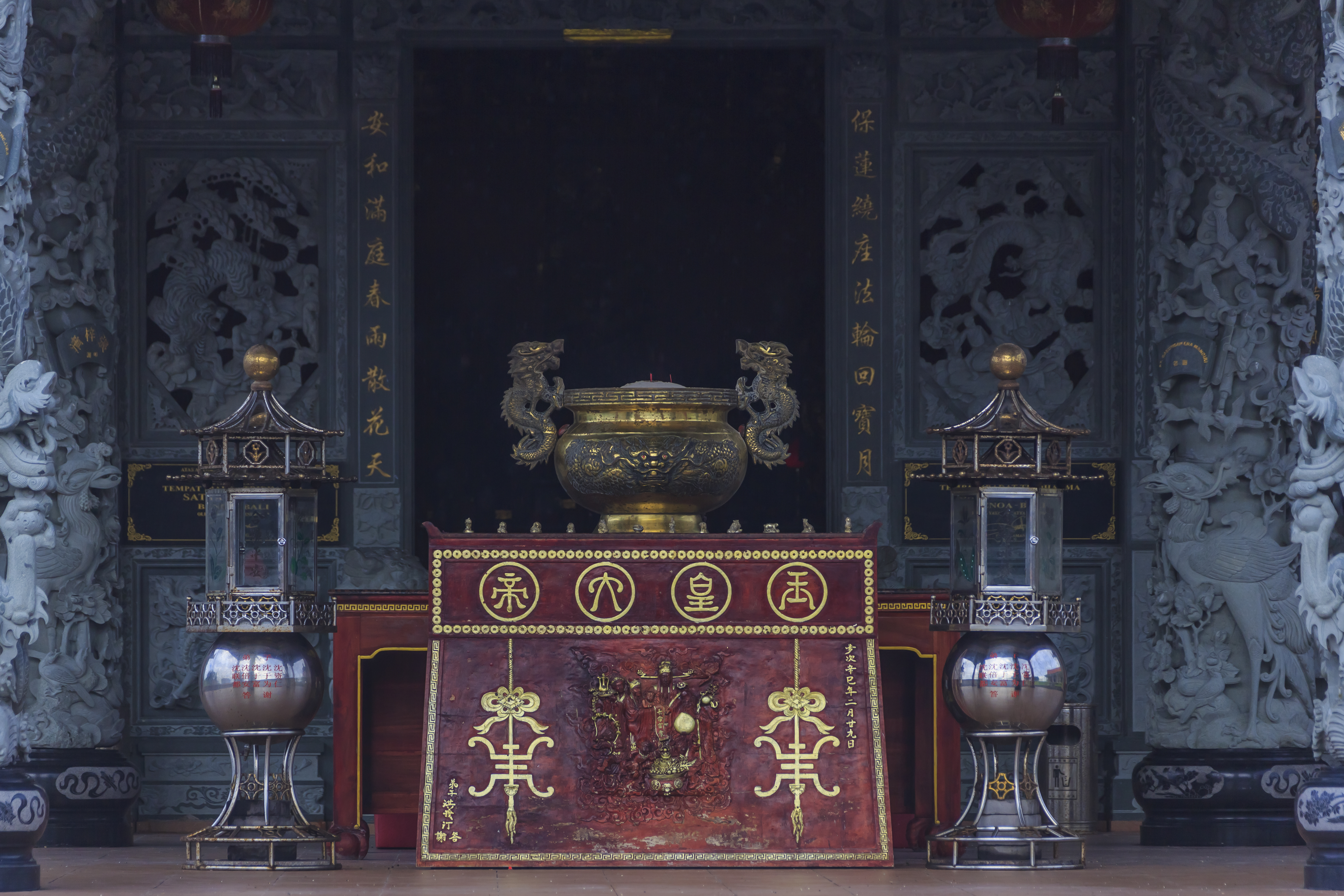
The altar to Tian

== See also ==
- Kim Tek Ie Temple (金德院), Jakarta
- Vihara Bahtera Bhakti (安卒大伯公廟), Jakarta
- Boen Tek Bio (文德廟), Tangerang
- Tay Kak Sie Temple (大覺寺), Semarang
- Sanggar Agung (宏善堂), Surabaya
- Hoo Ann Kiong Temple (護安宮), Riau
- Ban Hin Kiong Temple (萬興宮), Manado
- Gunung Timur Temple (東嶽觀), Medan
