= Kali Pasir Mosque =

Mosque in Tangerang, Banten, Indonesia

- Masjid Kali Pasir
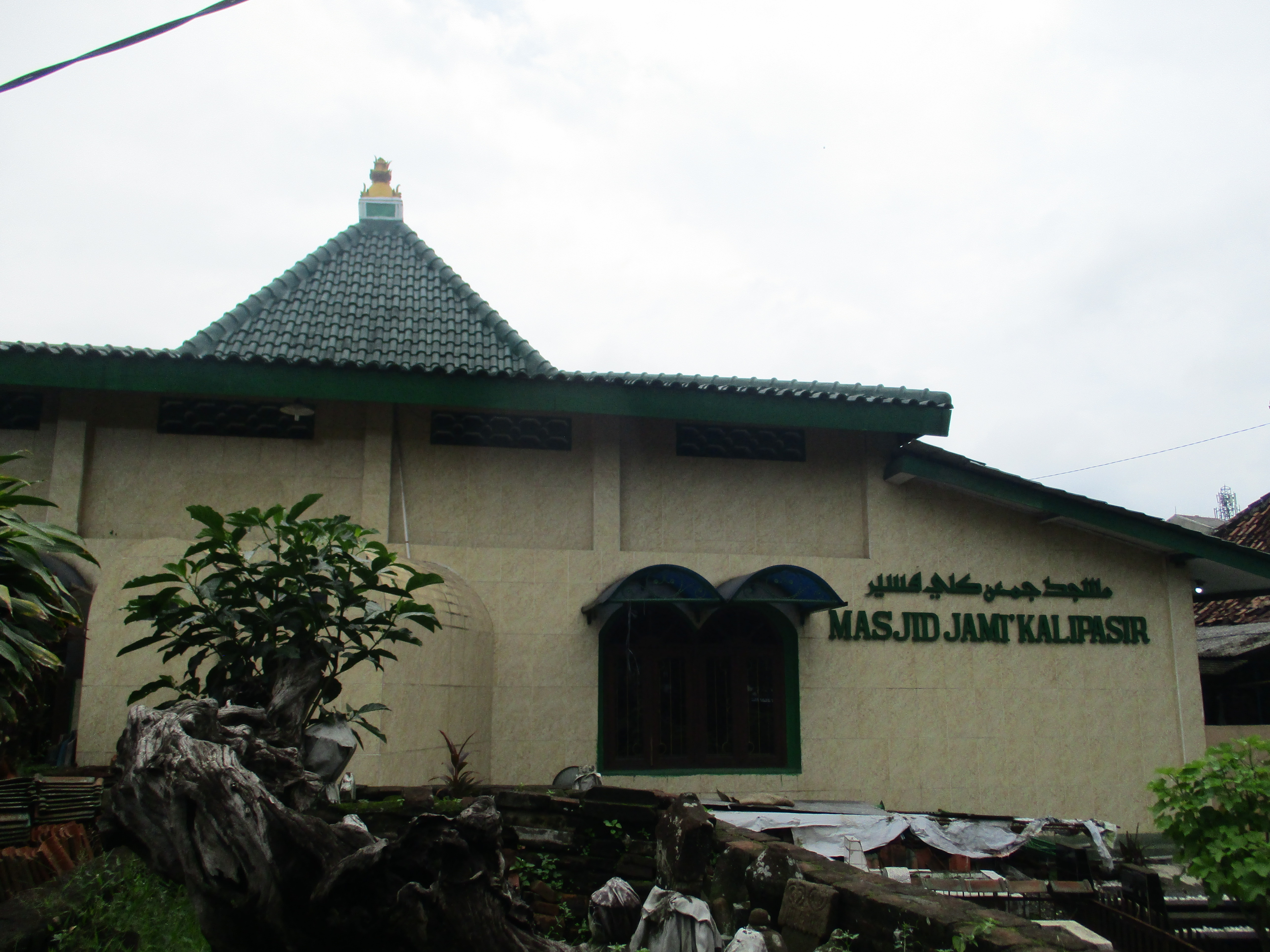

- Indonesia

Religion
- Affiliation: Islam
- Branch/tradition: Sunni

Location
- Location: Tangerang, Banten, Indonesia
- Coordinates: 6°10′45.2″S 106°37′43.9″E

Architecture
- Type: Mosque
- Style: Chinese
- Founder: Tumenggung Pamit Wijaya
- Established: 1700
- Interior area: 288 m^{2}

The Kali Pasir Mosque (Indonesian: Masjid Kali Pasir) is the oldest mosque in Tangerang city, a relic of Pajajaran Kingdom. It is located in Cisadane riverbank, in the middle of Chinese residential and is characterized by it Chinese pattern.

== History ==
The mosque was established in 1700 by Tumenggung Pamit Wijaya from Bogor Kahuripan and is approximately 288 square meters. Originally, Tumenggung Pamit Wijaya wanted to do syiar Islam from Cirebon Sultanate to Banten but he stopped in Tangerang and established a mosque. Construction of the mosque carried out by Muslims with the assistance of ethnic Chinese. In 1712 the management of the mosque was passed to his son, Raden Bagus Uning Wiradilaga. The mosque has deen repeatedly renovated, but the building is still stylized Arabic, Chinese and European. Currently, only two parts of the architecture that still complete retained, the four pillars in the mosque and the small dome with China pattern.
