= Sanggar Agung =

Chinese temple in Surabaya, Indonesia

Sanggar Agung Temple
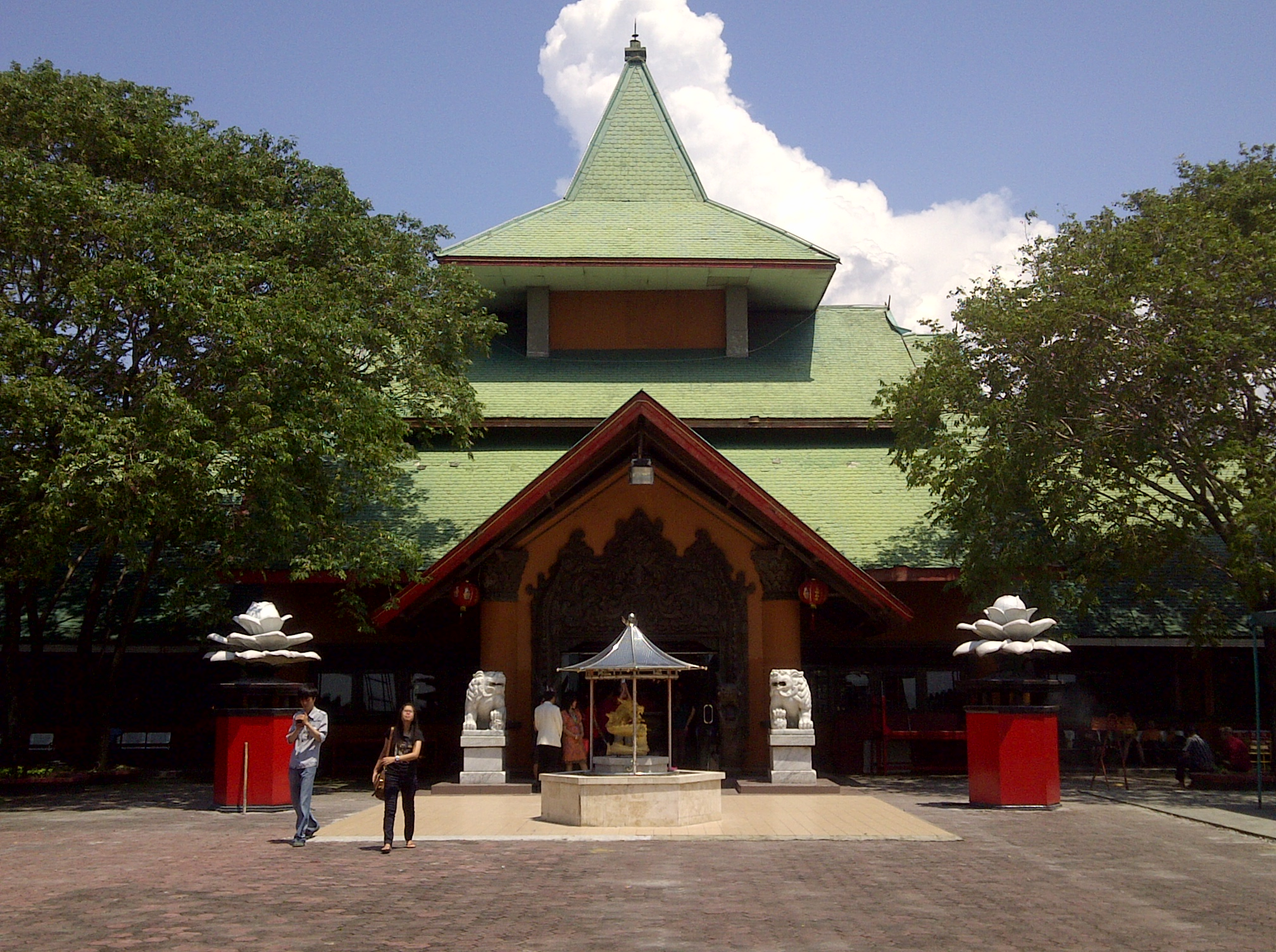
- The front side of Sanggar Agung Temple, Surabaya-Indonesia (facing Madura Strait)
- Interactive map of the Sanggar Agung Temple area

General information
- Architectural style: Chinese, Javanese, Balinese, Thai
- Location: East Java, Surabaya-Indonesia, Sukolilo Street 100, Kenjeran Park, Surabaya City
- Coordinates: 7.24868°S 112.80245°E
- Construction started: 1999
- Owner: Soetiadji Yudho and Family
- Landlord: Soetiadji Yudho and Family

Technical details
- Floor count: 1

Sanggar Agung Temple or Hong San Tang (Chinese: 宏善堂) is a Chinese temple in Surabaya dedicated to Chinese deities and other Asian religious icons. It is located within the Pantai Ria amusement park and has become a tourist destination, even though it is originally a worship place for Tridharma followers. The name of Sanggar Agung is derived from Indonesian language which can be translated as Great Hall.

The main icon of this temple is a 20 meters tall statue of Guan Yin on the waterfront, as a symbol that this temple is dedicated to Nan Hai Guan Shi Yin Pu Sa or Guan Yin Bodhisattva of the South Sea. The giant statue was built after one of its employees saw a woman dressed in white walking on the sea as she was about closing the temple at night, believed as the appearance of Guan Yin herself. The other icon is the giant Phra Phrom statue covered with gold.

== History ==
=== Kwan Kong Bio ===
In the Moon Festival of 1978, on the 15th day of the eighth month in the Chinese Calendar, a temple was built about 500 meters to the south of the current location of Sanggar Agung. The temple's name was Kwang Kong Bio (lit. Temple of Guan Gong). The location of this temple had been moved three times since, until Sanggar Agung was built in its current place. In 1999, the temple was officially moved to its present location as Sanggar Agung Temple. Some of the deities’ figurines at Sanggar Agung Temple was already placed in the older temple for some decades.

=== Construction of Sanggar Agung ===
Sanggar Agung Temple was built by the family of Soetiadji Yudho and was inaugurated by the time of Chinese New Year in 1999. In the beginning, Mr. Yudho intended to uplift the spiritual fervor of Tridharma followers and also hoped that the temple would become an icon of Surabaya City. The giant statue of Guan Yin was built two years later.

== Architecture ==
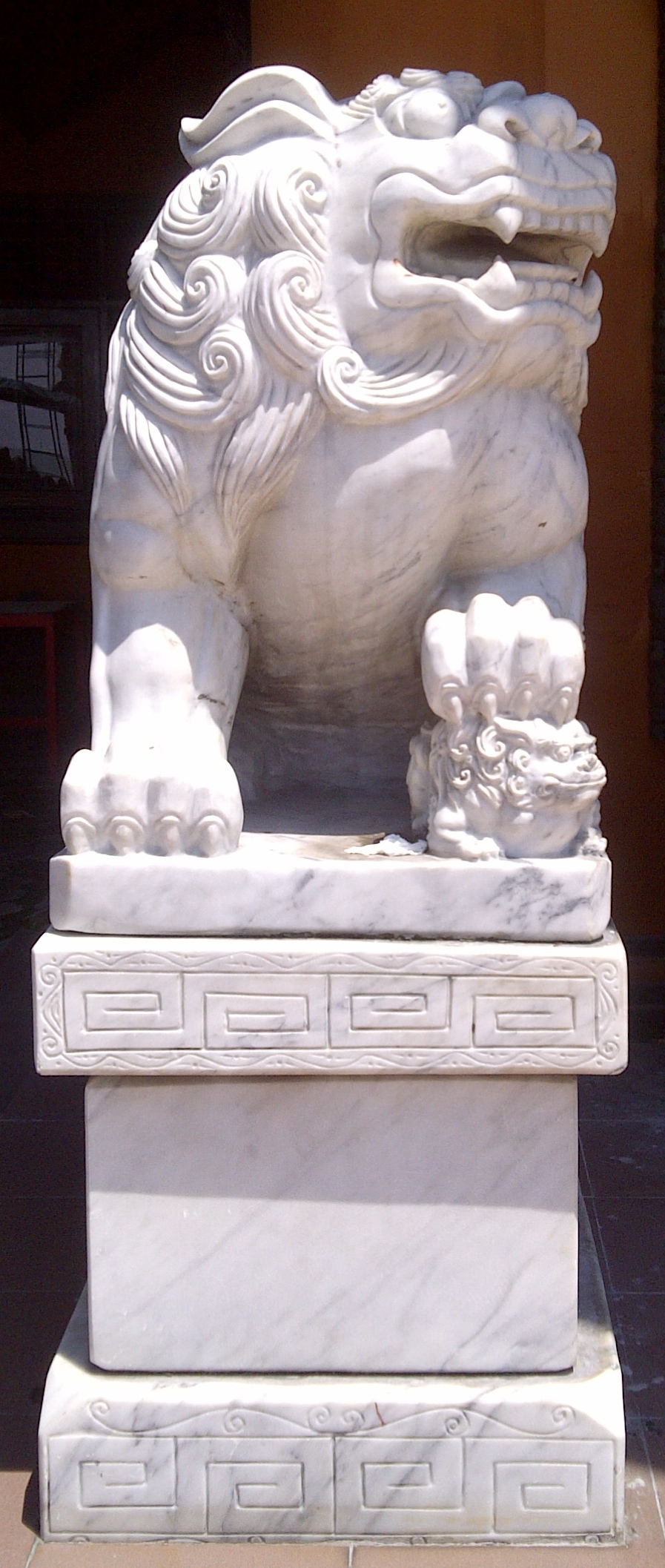
Right side Chinese lion statue represent Yin force, female, negative, take, carry a cub.

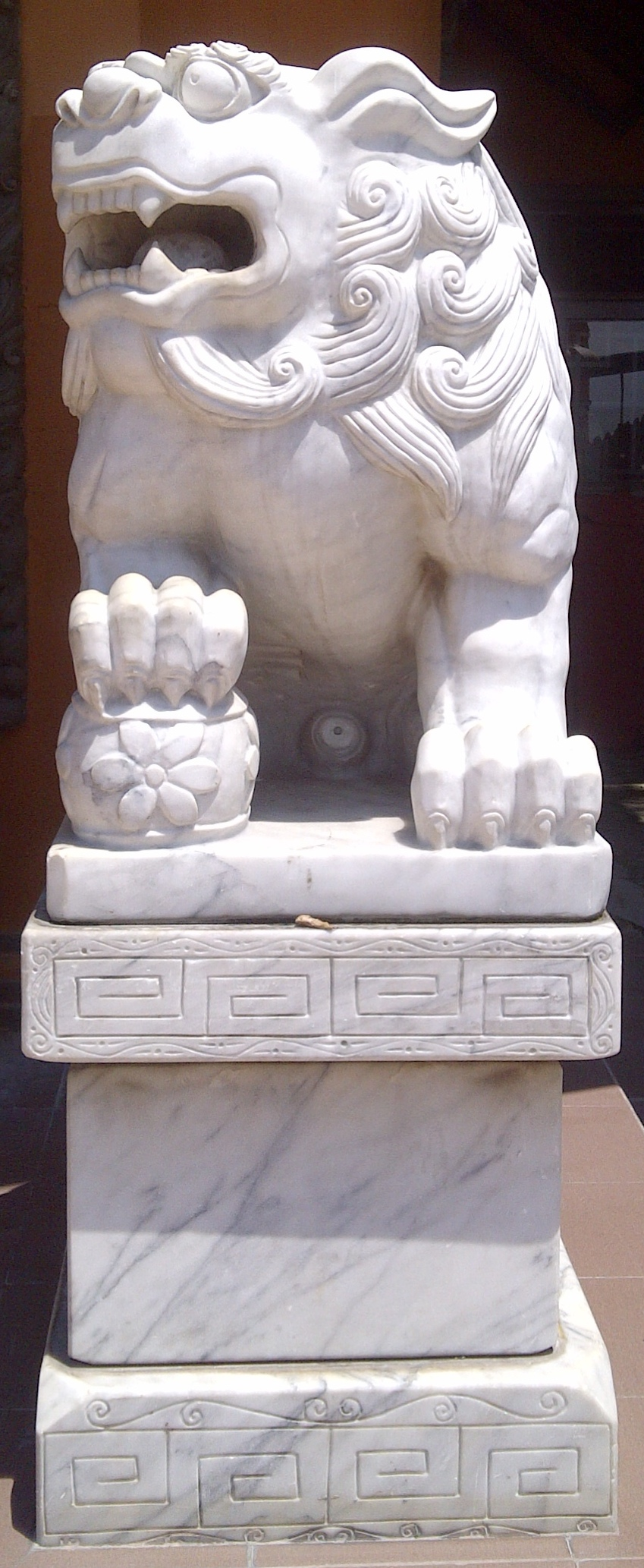
Left side Chinese lion statue represent Yang force, male, positive, bring, carry a ball.

The uniqueness of Sanggar Agung Temple is that this temple is built over the sea and shaped like a bay which is surrounded by mangroves. This temple occupies an area of approximately 4000 square meters with Bali-style building design combined with Javanese culture.

Freddy H. Istanto, the Dean of the Faculty of Technology and Design of Ciputra University, said that the worship complex of Sanggar Agung is very interesting to be studied because its exterior design has unique multi-cultural charges. The roof of Sanggar Agung uses a strong blend of Javanese style despite the general character of the building is Balinese style. According to him, there is an impression that Sanggar Agung is deliberately brought the image of Indonesian traditional buildings so as not to get stuck with the common style of Chinese temple or Buddhist Vihara, moreover the architecture style of traditional Chinese. Nevertheless, the tradition of Chinese temple still visible at Sanggar Agung, the example is the round holes in the wall. Mr. Istanto stressed that Sanggar Agung can be regarded as "the representation of psychological and cultural harmony conditions of indigenous communities with Tri Dharma peoples".

=== Giant Guan Yin statue ===
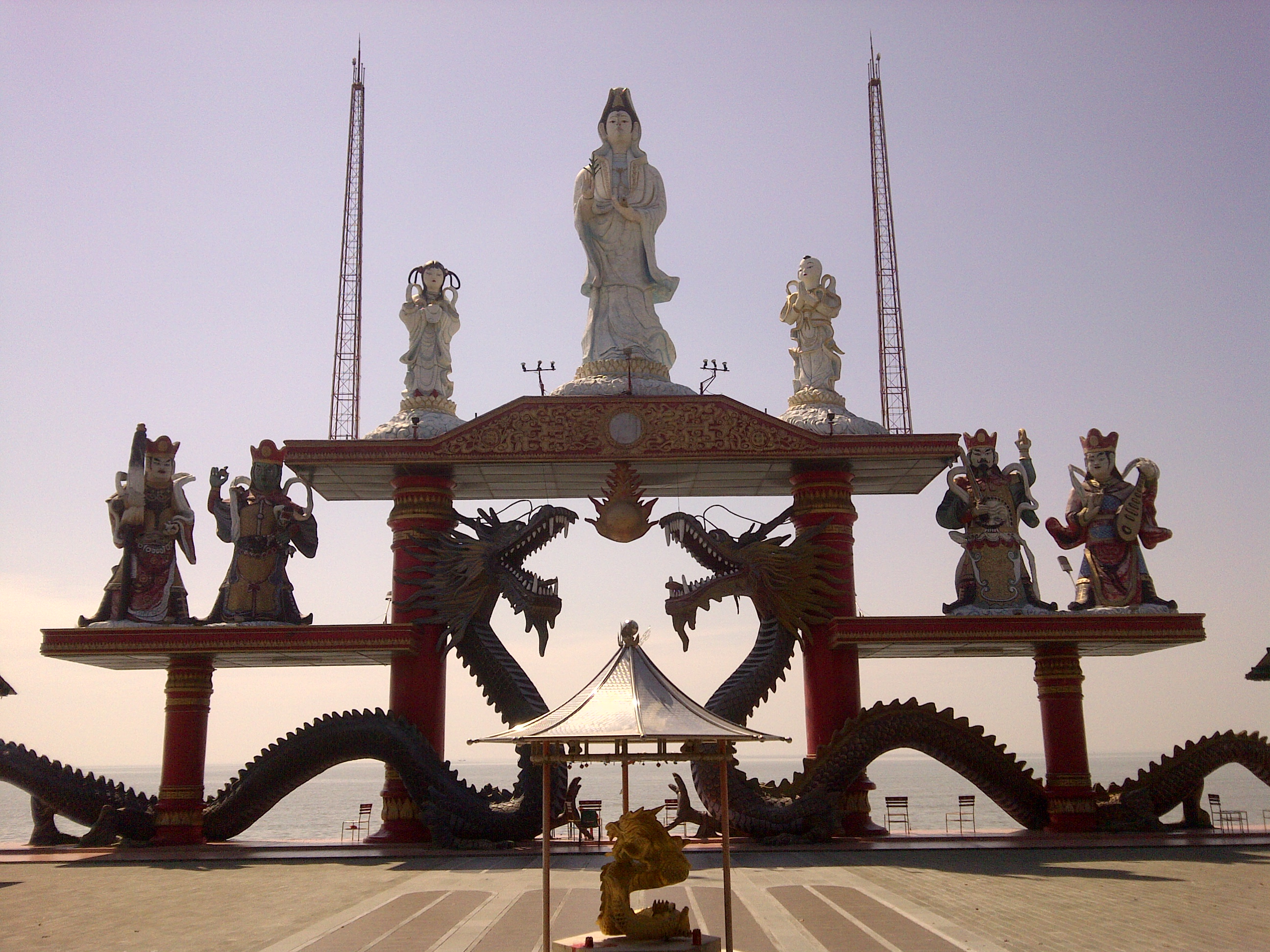
The ocean gate of Sanggar Agung decorated with giant Guan Yin statue with Long Nu and Sancai, Four Heavenly Kings, and a couple of Chinese dragons

Officially, Sanggar Agung claims that the Guan Yin statue that just stand on the east side of the temple has a height of 18 meters. It is accompanied with 2 bodyguards Shan Nan and Tong Nu and the Four God Kings who guards the 4 corners of the world. A heaven gate under Guan Yin's feet is guarded by a pair of Heavenly Dragons. Most sources claims that the height of Guan Yin statue at Sanggar Agung is about 20 meters, while the length of dragon statues each 6 meters. One can see Suramadu Bridge just North East from this ocean gate, and Madura Island on the horizon.

=== Phra Phrom Stupa ===
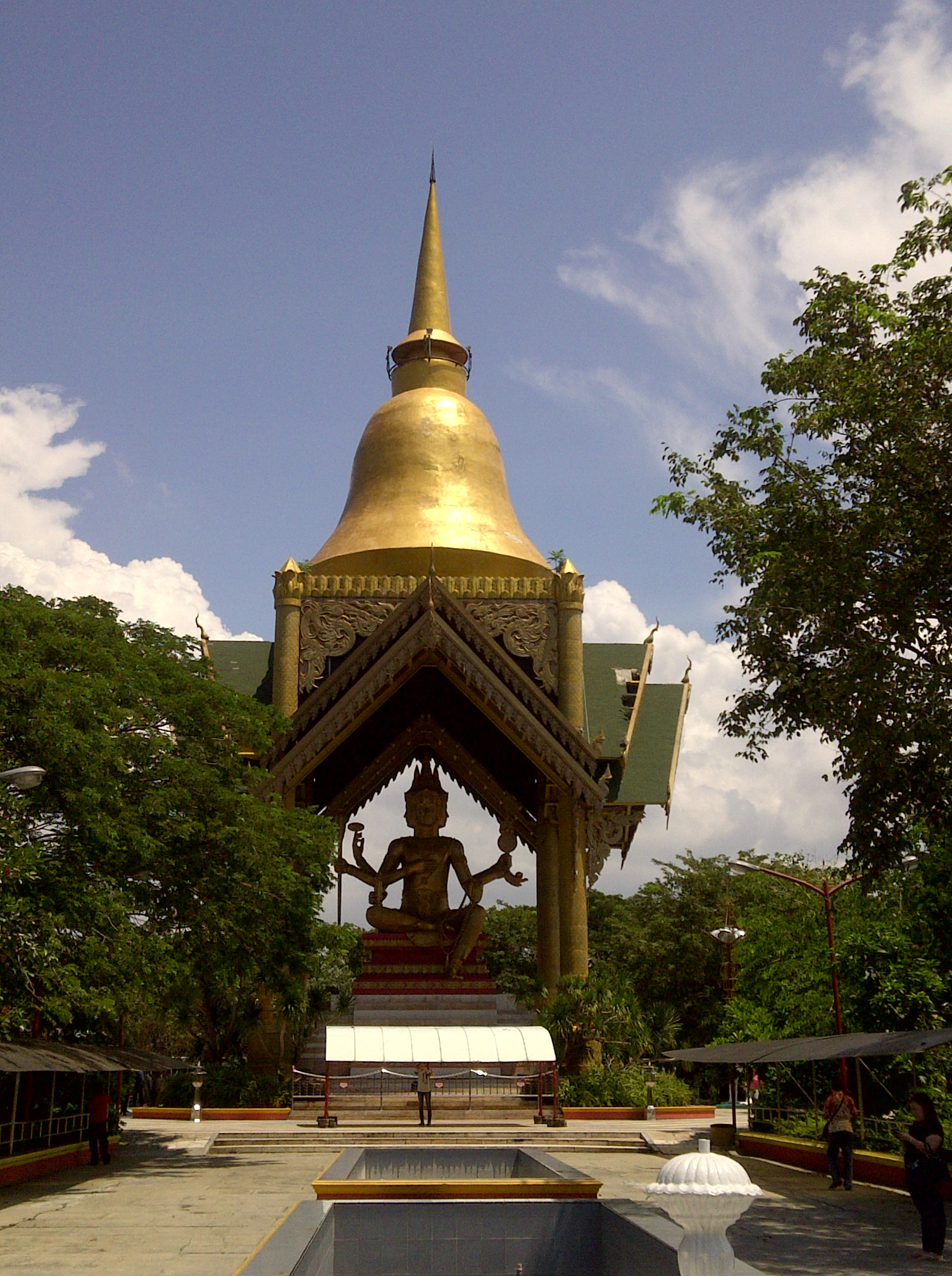
Gold covered giant Phra Phrom statue with Thai styled stupa

The giant Phra Phrom statue is located on an area across the street from the main building of Sanggar Agung Temple. It is located in the backyard of Sanggar Agung, because the front side of the temple is overlooking the sea. Phra Phrom or She Mien Fo in Chinese (lit. Four Face Buddha) is commonly called Maha Brahma by Indonesian people. This statue is registered by MURI (Museum Rekor Indonesia) or the Museum of Indonesian Records as the biggest Four Face Buddha statue in Indonesia.

Construction of Phra Phrom Stupa began in July 2003 and was inaugurated on November 9, 2004. The inauguration was attended by some important persons, included some prelates like Viriyanadi Mahatera from Buddhayana Indonesia, Phrarajkhru Sivacharaya from Thailand, and Gede Anom Jala Karana Manuaba of Indonesian Hinduism.

The land size is about 1.5 acres, while the main stupa building in the centre is 81 square meters. The construction of the stupa mostly used number nine, for it has its own meaning and to adjust the reference from the similar statue in Thailand. The Maha Brahma Stupa is surrounded by park with trees and four white elephant statues of four meters high in every corner of its yard.

The roof of the stupa is supported by four pillars of golden green color. In general, the stupa of Maha Brahma is divided into 3 parts: the stupa or the roof, Maha Brahma statue, and the throne. The height of the stupa is 18 meters, while the Maha Brahma statue and the throne are 9 meters each. The statue is full covered with 22 karat kampoh ("gold paper") imported from Thailand amounting to 1.5 billion rupiahs. Although this monument is the biggest in Indonesia, Four-Faced Buddha statue in Thailand is still the biggest in the world. Totally, the height of this Maha Brahma statue, from the throne to the roof, is 36 meters.

== Social function ==
=== Place of worship ===
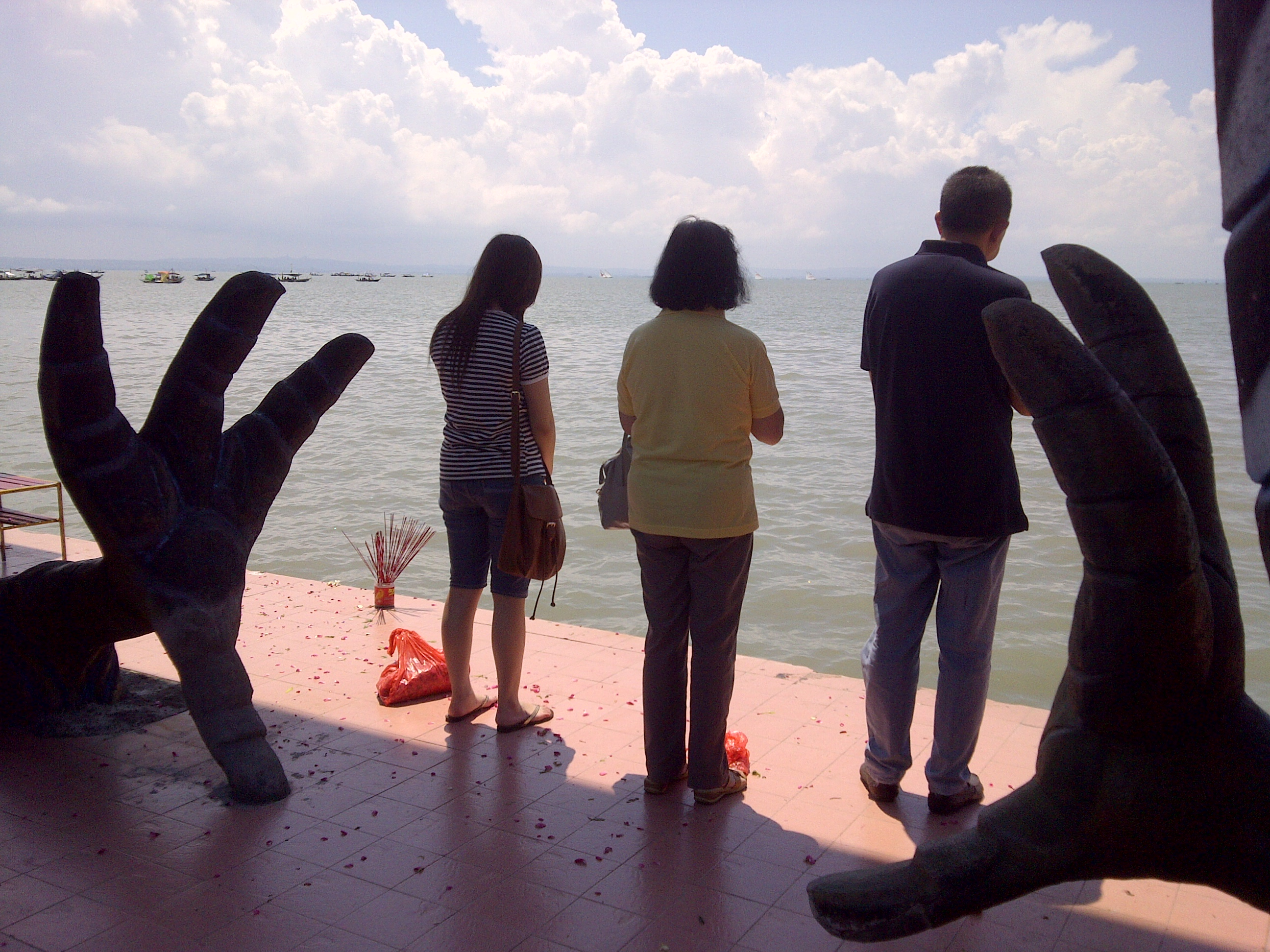
A Chinese family pray for their deceased members at Qingming Festival of 2013 under the Heaven Gate of Sanggar Agung

Sanggar Agung Temple is a place of worship for Tridharma followers, i.e. the Confucianists, Buddhists (Mahayana), and Taoists. Because Sanggar Agung is located on the sea front, this temple also become a favorite place for Chinese people to pray for their cremated family members.

Even though Sanggar Agung is a place of worship for the Tridharma religion, many of its employees and trustees are came from any other religions such as Islam and Christianity. The one who saw Guan Yin walked over the sea at night is a Muslim.

=== Tourist destination ===
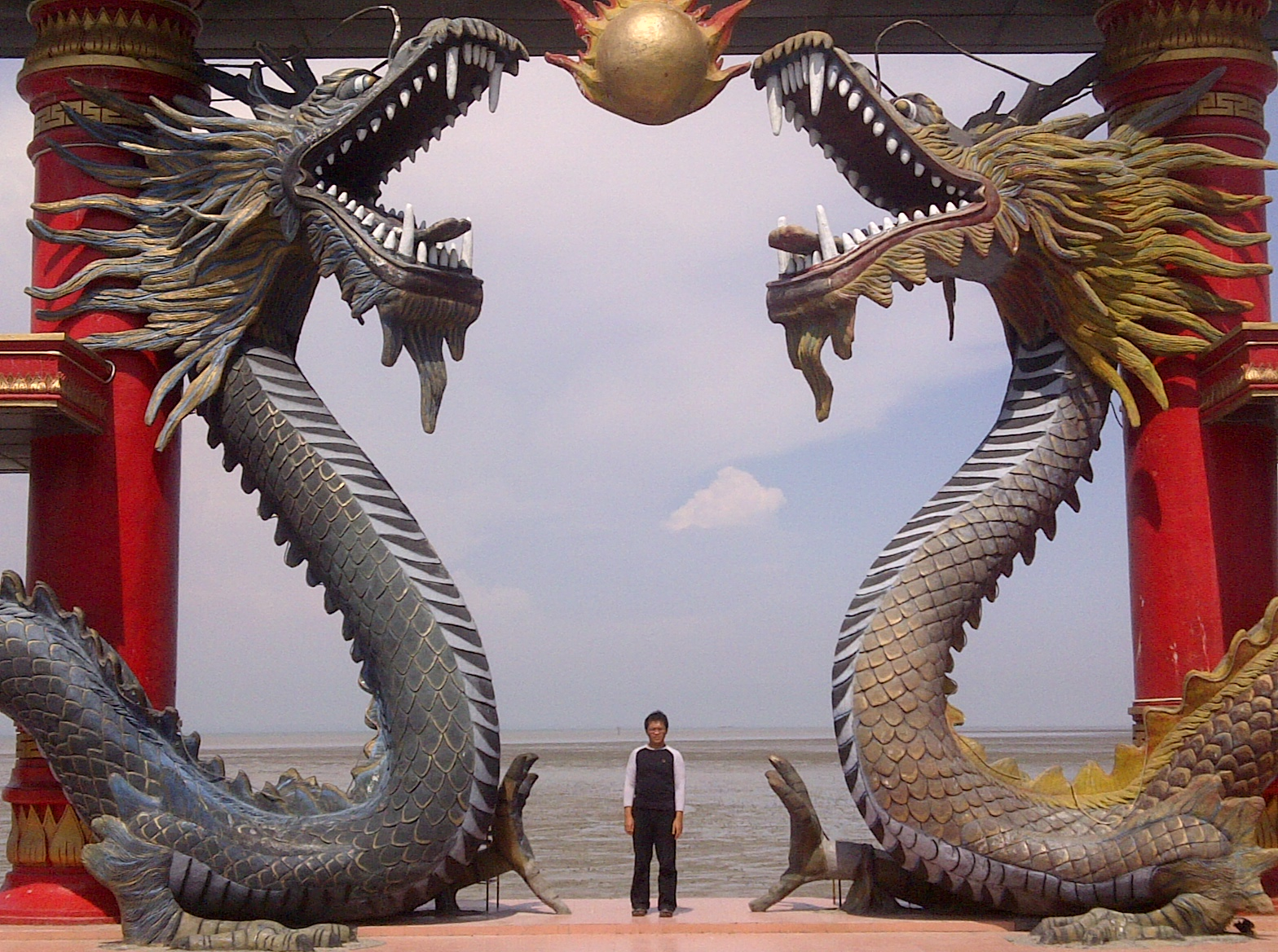
A visitor took a picture between the dragon statues of ocean gate of Sanggar Agung

The visitor of Sanggar Agung Temple are come from many religious background, especially people who want to see its icons or photographers and travelers. This temple is becoming the main attraction of Pantai Ria, Kenjeran Amusement Park of Surabaya.

As an iconic temple, on September 21, 2010, Sanggar Agung held Full Moon Festival (Zhongqiujie) and invited many artist groups from other cities and other islands such as Minahasa, Bali, Solo, Ponorogo, and so on. The drum band groups from Muhammadiyah School and AAL were also enliven the festival.

=== Natural conservation efforts ===
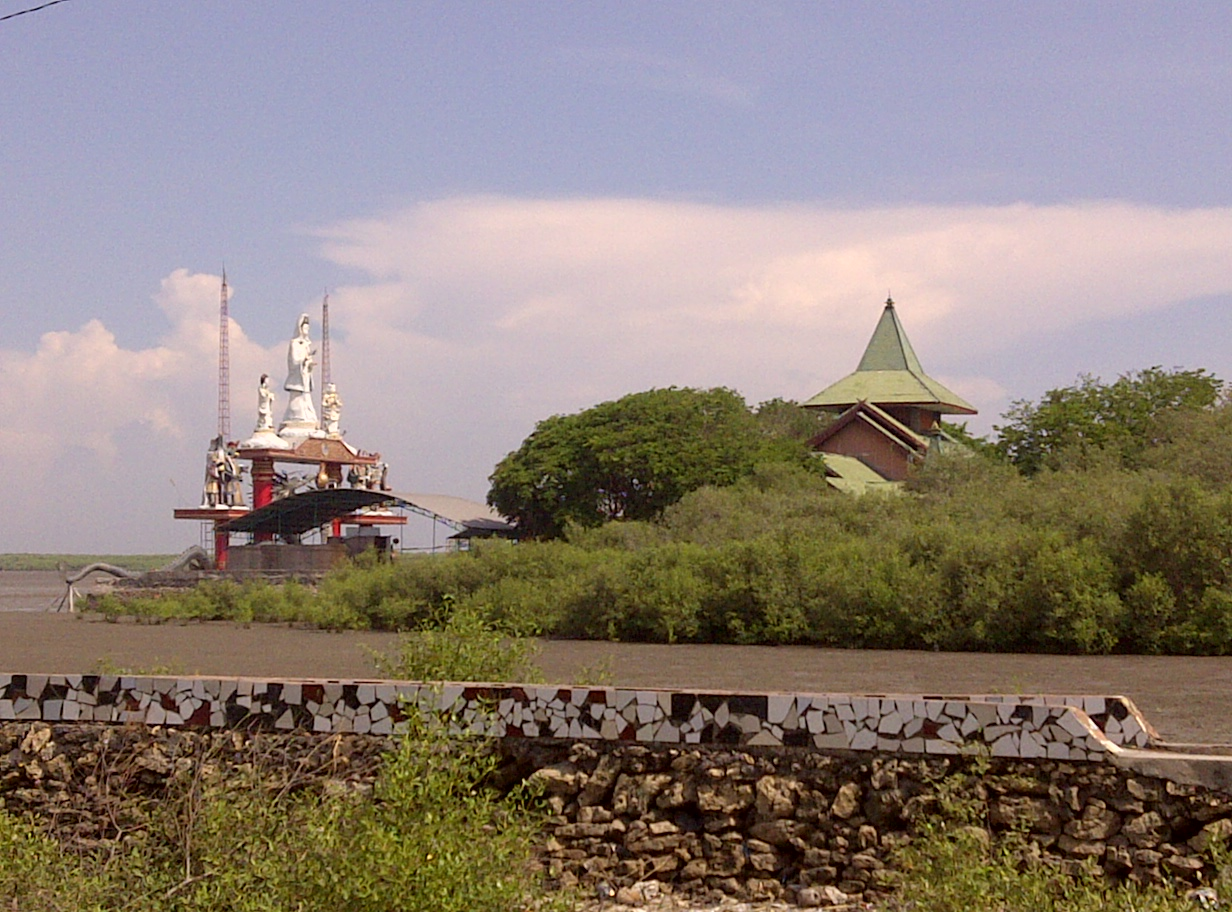
Sanggar Agung Temple surrounded by mangrove

The mangrove surround the temple is a natural habitat for many wild life, such as stork, crab, sparrow, and mudskipper. As such, the temple has come under conservation efforts for these fauna. Buddhist practitioners will often perform the fangshen ritual, a rite in which these animals are released into this habitat.

=== Record of MURI ===
The Museum of Indonesian Records (MURI) was awarded several times for the activities held at Sanggar Agung. In September 2002, the award was given to Soetiadji Yudho for holding the festival of 2000 lampion. In November 9, 2004, Sanggar Agung received an award from MURI for the largest Maha Brahma (Phra Phrom) statue in Indonesia.

In 2007, Bintang Toedjoe, Inc. held a convoy of 108 barongsai from Kya Kya (old Chinese Town of Surabaya) to Sanggar Agung, Kenjeran. This was recorded as the longest Barongsai convoy by MURI and recorded by Jawa Pos Media Televisi, Inc.

== List of altars ==
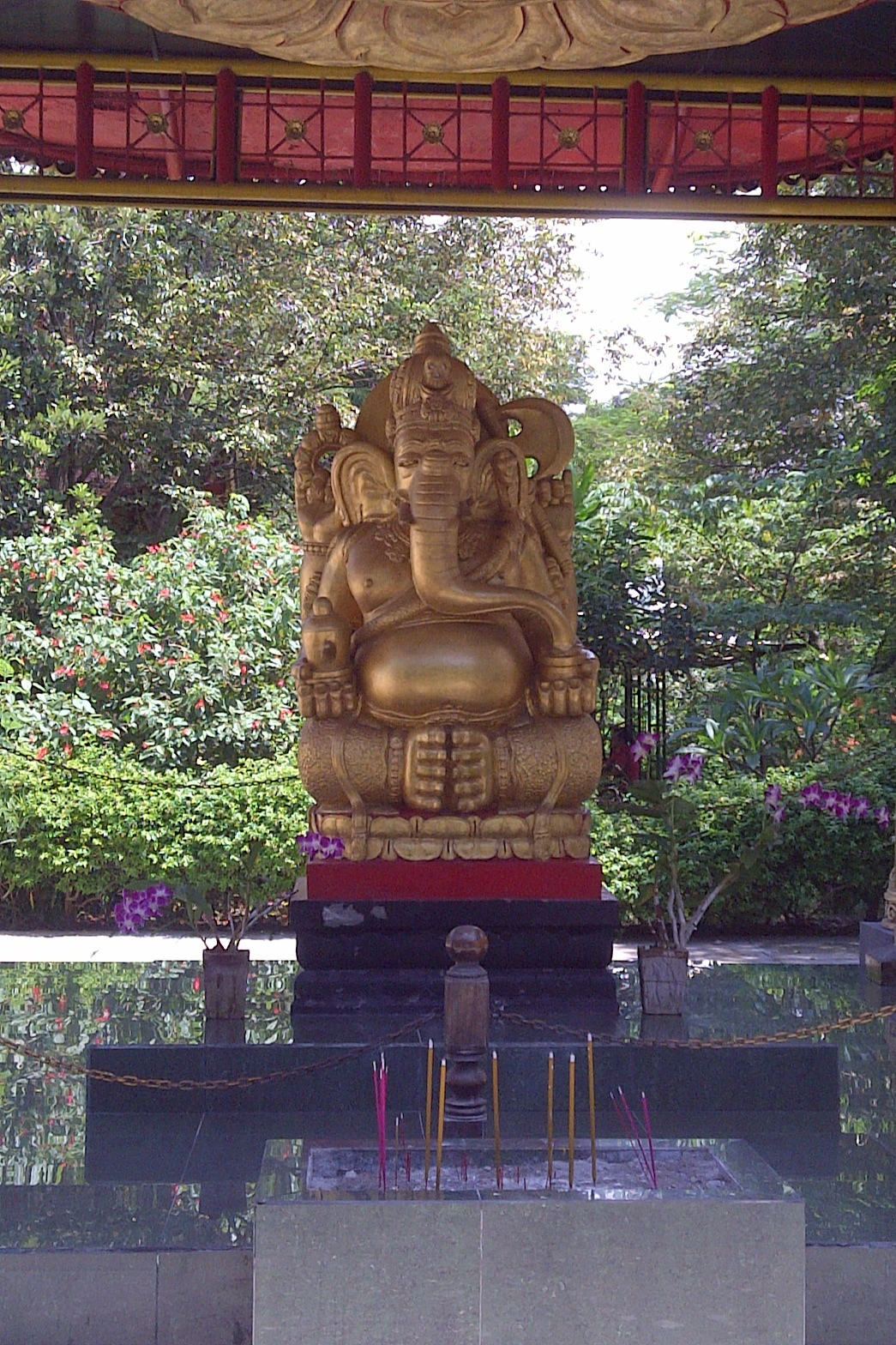
The altar of man-sized Ganesha statue, also worshipped by Hindus

=== Altars inside the temple ===
The numbering of the altars is based on the order of praying at Sanggar Agung, starts from the front side of the temple which is overlooking the sea.

0. Dragon God (originally only an ornament, but devotees also pray to the deity)

1. Tian
2. Mahayana Buddhism Pantheon: Sakyamuni, Bhaisajyaguru, Amitabha, (Nan Hai Guan Shi Yin Pu Sa, Ksitigarbha, Maitreya), and 18 Arhats
3. Theravada Buddhism Altar: Gautama Buddha
4. Tai Shang Lao Jun
5. Tian Shang Sheng Mu
6. Xuan Tian Shang Di
7. Guan Sheng Di Jun
8. Fu De Zheng Shen
9. Cai Shen Ye & Ba Xian
10. Kong Fuzi

=== Altars on Phra Phrom yard ===
1. Ganesha
2. Front side of Phra Phrom
3. Right side of Phra Phrom
4. Back side of Phra Phrom
5. Left side of Phra Phrom

== See also ==
- Kim Tek Ie Temple (金德院), Jakarta
- Vihara Bahtera Bhakti (安卒大伯公廟), Jakarta
- Boen Tek Bio (文德廟), Tangerang
- Tay Kak Sie Temple (大覺寺), Semarang
- Hoo Ann Kiong Temple (護安宮), Riau
- Ban Hin Kiong Temple (萬興宮), Manado
- Gunung Timur Temple (東嶽觀), Medan
- Satya Dharma Temple (保安宮), Bali
