= Ban Hin Kiong Temple =

- 萬興宮; Kelenteng Ban Hin Kiong
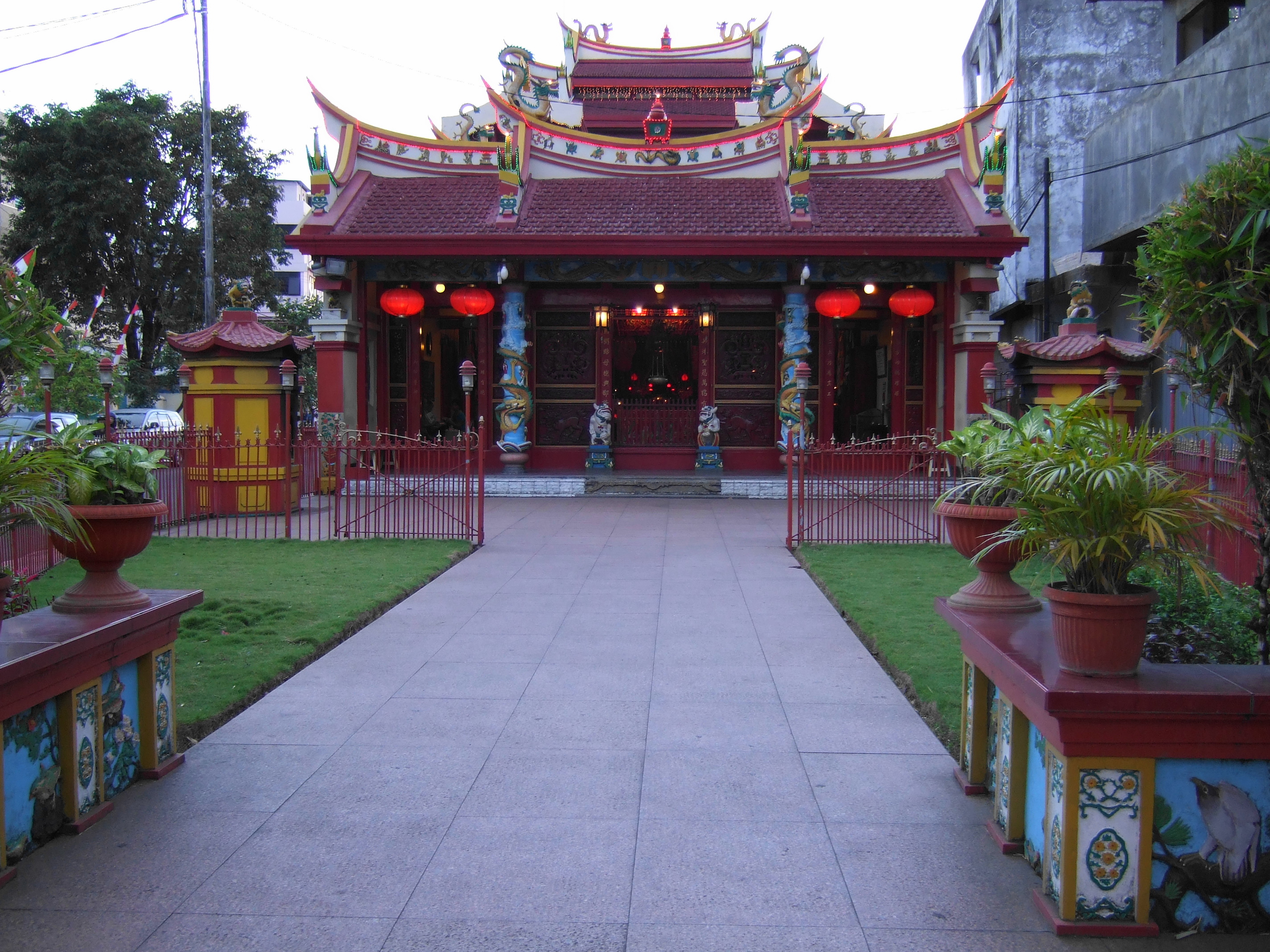
- the temple, 2009

Religion
- Affiliation: Taoism
- District: Tuminting
- Province: North Sulawesi

Location
- Location: Manado, Indonesia
- Country: Indonesia
- Interactive map of Ban Hin Kiong Temple
- Coordinates: 1.4940102°N 124.8447537°E

Architecture
- Type: Chinese
- Established: 1819

Ban Hin Kiong (simplified Chinese: 万兴宫; traditional Chinese: 萬興宮; pinyin: Wàn xìng gōng) is a Taoist temple at Jl. D.I. Panjaitan, Manado. It is the oldest temple in the city of Manado. This temple was established in 1819, then in 1893 there was built a shrine or known as Tek Kong Su in Hokkien. At the beginning, the building was made of bamboo wood.

Ban means abundant, Hin means blessings or prosperity, and Kiong means palace.

== History ==
The Ban Hin Kiong temple has been organizationally managed since 1935 through an organization Sam Khauw Hwee association founded on the efforts and initiative of two figures: Yo Sio Sien and Que Boen Tjen.

On 14 March 1970 Ban Hin Kiong temple was burned by several people. On the initiative of Nyong Loho (Soei Swie Goan) who later served as chairman of development and chief of the Ban Hin Kiong temple, renovation construction began. Ban Hin Kiong temple (commonly abbreviated BHK) has undergone several renovations of the building, both the addition of the floor and courtyard.

== See also ==
- Kim Tek Ie Temple (金德院), Jakarta
- Vihara Bahtera Bhakti (安卒大伯公廟), Jakarta
- Boen Tek Bio (文德廟), Tangerang
- Tay Kak Sie Temple (大覺寺), Semarang
- Sanggar Agung (宏善堂), Surabaya
- Hoo Ann Kiong Temple (護安宮), Riau
- Gunung Timur Temple (東嶽觀), Medan
- Satya Dharma Temple (保安宮), Bali
