= Gunung Timur Temple =

Chinese temple in Medan, Indonesia

Temple of Eastern Mountain
- Vihara Gunung Timur 東嶽觀; Tong Yuk Kuang
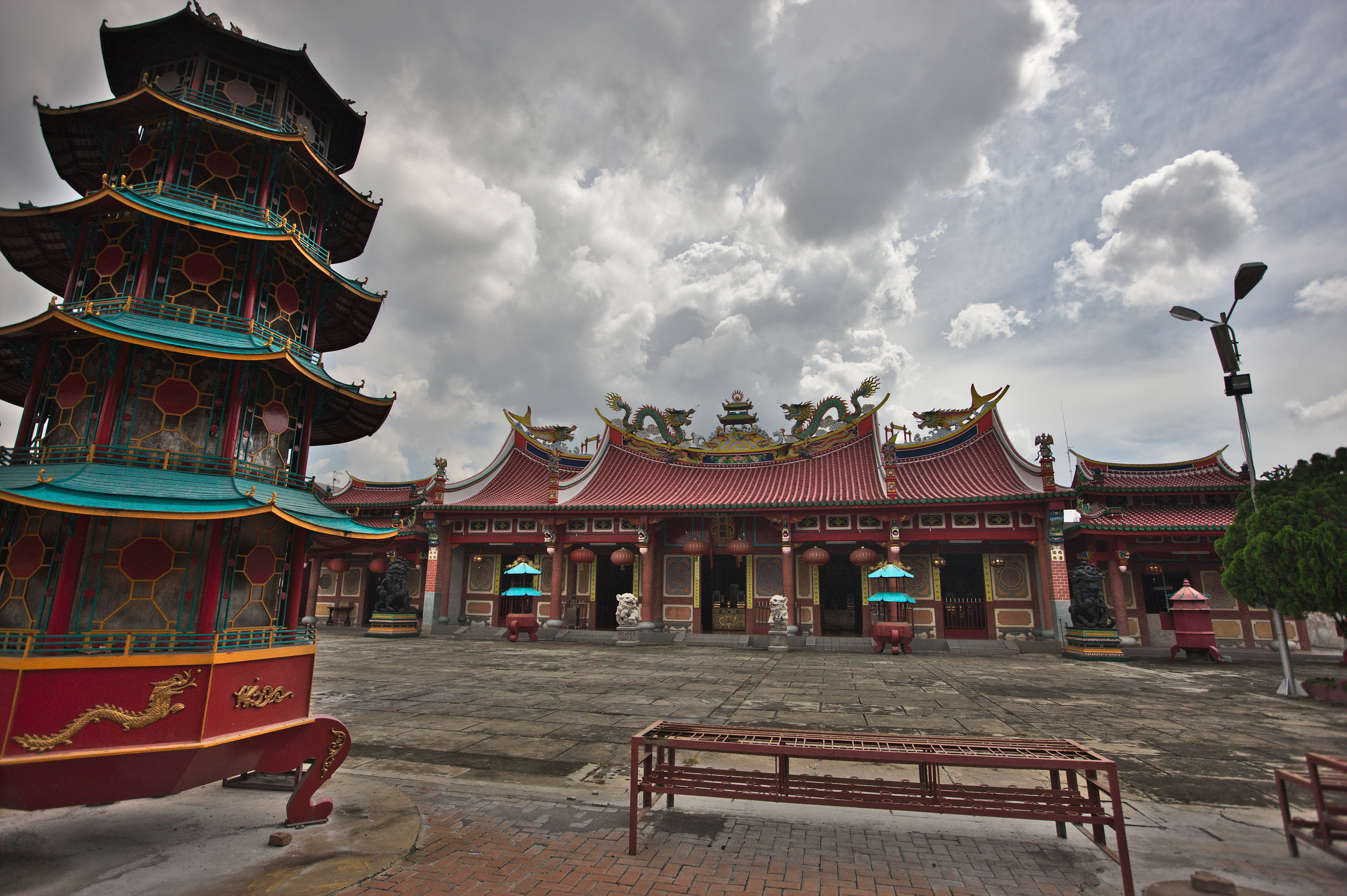
- Main Hall of the Temple

Religion
- Affiliation: mainly Taoism, Buddhism
- Province: North Sumatera

Location
- Location: Jalan Hang Tuah, Medan, Indonesia
- Interactive map of Temple of Eastern Mountain

Architecture
- Style: Chinese
- Groundbreaking: 1930

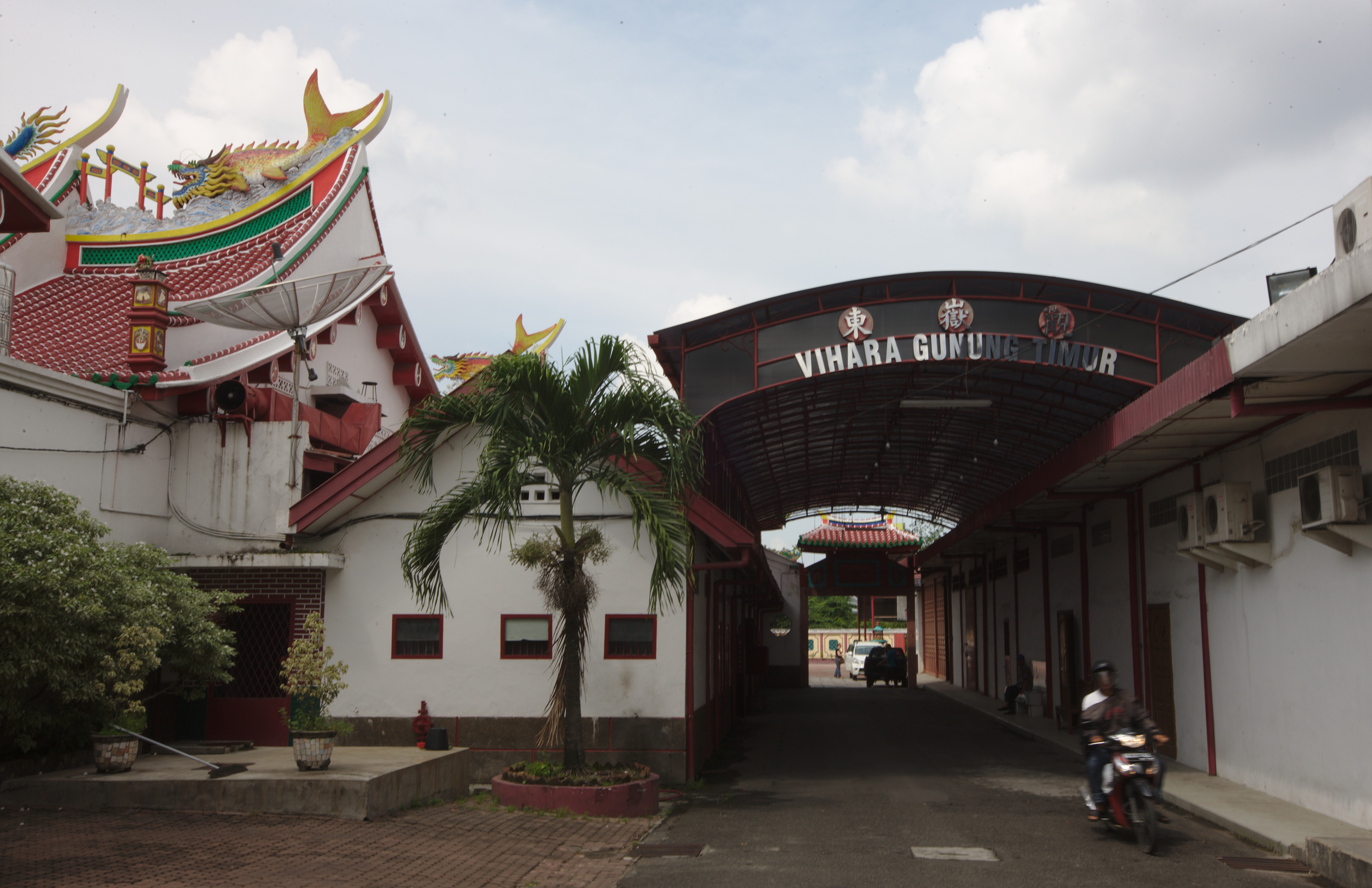
The central entryway at the Chinese Temple of Vihara Gunung Timur

Gunung Timur Temple (simplified Chinese: 东岳观; traditional Chinese: 東嶽觀; pinyin: Dōng yuè guān; Pe̍h-ōe-jī: Tông-Yuk-Kuàng) is a Chinese temple which is the largest in the city of Medan, Indonesia and possibly also on the island of Sumatra. This temple was built in the 1962 and dedicated to Dongyue Dadi (東嶽大帝). This temple is located at Jalan Hang Tuah, about 500 meters from the Sri Mariamman Temple and is located on the side of Babura river.

This temple already served as the centre of faith for the Chinese community in Medan for many years and it was also one of Medan's multicultural icon, as there are an oldest Hindu temple Sri Mariamman temple and also a mosque named Masjid Agung nearby. This temple always be filled with worshippers on Imlek, Cap Go Meh days and Chit Gwee Pua festival.

== History ==
This temple was founded jointly and cooperation by Taoist and Buddhist communities in Medan. Besides being a place of worship for Buddhists, the temple is also famous as a historical site in Medan. Formerly, this building is a land of steep land near the Babura river, in 1960, this temple was begun to be built. At the entrance of the temple, there are two ornate statues of lions and dragons are the hallmark of the Chinese ethnicity. When entered into the temple, there is a place for worship, decorated with incense and candles. Theare a big drum nearby the praying room, which will be used at the time of the Chinese New Year. At several big day such as Chinese New Year or Cap Go Meh, this temple would be crowded because it is often held a lion dance procession.

== Architecture ==
The building was designed so that it overlooks the River Babura. The Chinese people believe, with the design facing the River Babura, it will bring a good luck to the temple and those who visit there.

In addition, the temple is also using a color shades of red and yellow. Both colors are selected as a dominant color because it is regarded as the color of good luck by the Chinese. At the top of the building, there is a decorated of a pair green colored dragon facing each other with the sun in the middle. Behind a dragon statue there also has a pair of giant dragon-headed fish too. Right in front of the temple there are also huge statues of a black and white lion.

It also contains a large paved area with an impressively scaled incense burner, two covered badminton courts, a very large main hall and is partly surrounded by a moat and walls.

== Deities ==
In this place, there are several altars, the location of the worship of the gods. In total there are 80 statues of deities in this place. In the first place there is the statue of Lord Shen Jing Ru followed by Lord Shen Zai Zhu Sen Da in beside him. More to the rear there is god Cen Cing Tien and Xian Shi Dian. In the sixth number there are Ou Xian Gu and Wang Yan Dian Shi statue guarding the left and right of the burning of incense in the temple. Likewise statue of Lord Liu Fan Xian Shi in the next portion.

On the inside of the building there is a Buddhist altar, accompanied by Maitreya Buddha and the Goddess Kwan Im. While on the right side there an altar filled with some gods in the culture of Chinese traditional beliefs, the Tua Pek Kong accompanied with Thay Suei. Underneath there is a statue of Thien Kou (dog heaven) and Pek Ho Kong (White Tiger) escort by Tho Te Kong (the god of the land).

== See also ==
- Kim Tek Ie Temple (金德院), Jakarta
- Vihara Bahtera Bhakti (安卒大伯公廟), Jakarta
- Boen Tek Bio (文德廟), Tangerang
- Tay Kak Sie Temple (大覺寺), Semarang
- Sanggar Agung (宏善堂), Surabaya
- Hoo Ann Kiong Temple (護安宮), Riau
- Ban Hin Kiong Temple (萬興宮), Manado
- Satya Dharma Temple (保安宮), Bali
