= Kim Tek Ie Temple =

Kim Tek Ie
- 金德院
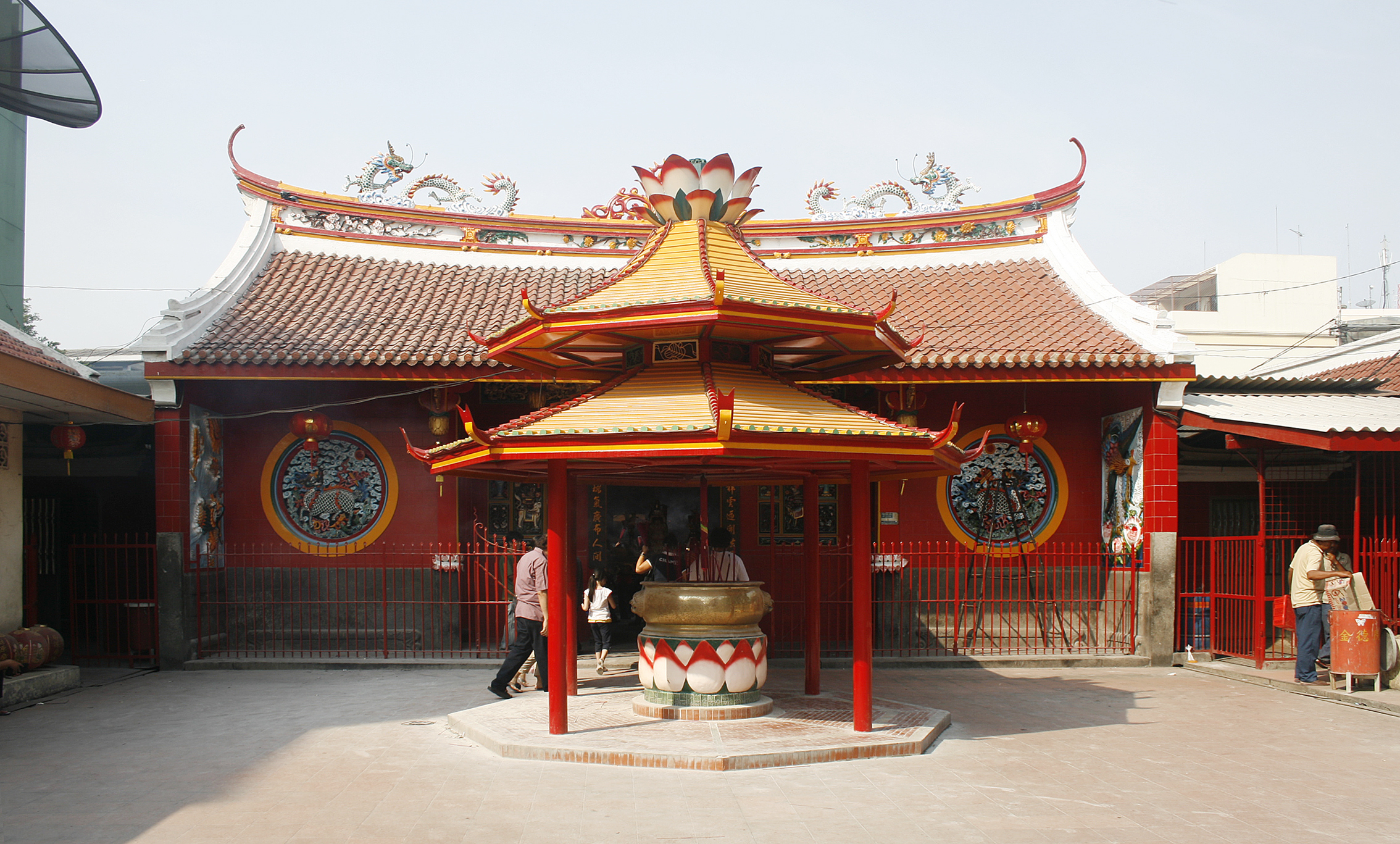
- Vihara Dharma Bhakti, also known as klenteng Jin De Yuan or Kim Tek Ie.

- Location within Jakarta
- Alternative names: Jin De Yuan 金德院

General information
- Status: Under restoration following the 2015 fire incident.
- Type: Klenteng
- Architectural style: Chinese
- Location: Glodok, Jakarta, Indonesia, Jalan Kemenangan III Petak Sembilan No.19, Jakarta 11120
- Coordinates: 6°8′38″S 106°48′46″E
- Estimated completion: 1755 or 1760

Design and construction
- Architect: anonymous

Website
- www.jindeyuan.org

Kim Tek Ie Temple, also called Vihara Dharma Bhakti, also known as 金德院 (Mandarin Jīn dé yuàn or Hokkien Kim Tek Ie), is a klenteng (a local term for a Chinese temple) located in the China Town neighborhood of Glodok, Jakarta, Indonesia. Completed in 1650, Vihara Dharma Bhakti is the oldest Chinese temple in Jakarta.

== History ==
The complex of Vihara Dharma Bhakti was erected in 1650 under the order of Luitenant der Chinezen Kwee Hoen. The temple was named Kwan Im Teng in Hokkien or Guānyīn tíng in Mandarin (觀音亭), literally "Pavilion of Guanyin", to honor Kwan Im whom the temple is dedicated to. The name Kwan Im Teng is the origin of the word klenteng itself, later becoming a general term in the Indies to refer to any Chinese place of worship.

The temple was burned to ground during the massacre of the Chinese ethnic group in 1740. Following the incident, Governor-General Gustaaf Willem van Imhoff established a semi-autonomous organization for each ethnic group to supervised and coordinated each of the community's social and religious matter. For the Chinese ethnic group, the organization was called Kong Koan. The Kong Koan restored the temple in 1755 under the leadership of a Kapitein der Chinezen Oey Tji Lo, as well as managing all the maintenance of the Chinese temple. The restored temple received the name Kim Tek Ie (or Jīn Dé Yuàn in Mandarin). Kong Koan also managed the other old Chinese temples in Batavia, among them are the Kuan Im Tong, a Chinese temple in Ancol, and Hian Thian Shang Te.

Following the end of the Dutch colony in Indonesia, the Kong Koan was dissolved. Management of Chinese temples in Indonesia was done by an organization called Dewan Wihara Indonesia or DEWI (The Council of Indonesian Vihara). For temple management, a person serving as the "head censer" or Lu-zhu with his assistants were set for each Chinese temple and are responsibility for holding a fund-raising activities for the temple as well as managing religious ceremonies in the temple. A Lu-zhu is usually chosen from an influential entrepreneur or businessman in the community.

Following the nationalization of names in 1965, The DEWI recommended the name Vihara Dharma Bhakti for Kim Tek Ie, as a nationalistic effort to remove all foreign-sounding names in Indonesia.

=== 2015 Fire ===
On the morning of March 2, 2015, Vihara Dharma Bhakti was destroyed by fire. The source of the fire was from a piece of tarpaulin hanging near candles that caught alight and then spread throughout the main building. Among the damage were the ornamented roof frame of the temple and some 40 historic sculptures.

== Festival and ceremonies ==
Vihara Dharma Bhakti is the center of Chinese-related festivities in Jakarta. Among the most notable celebration held in the temple was the Zhong Yuan Festival (local Hokkien name Cioko) held in the temple's courtyard, and the Lantern Festival (Cap go meh). During the colonial period, a Peranakan Chinese opera was performed yearly every Vesak, accompanied by the Batavian kroncong music and enlivened with traditional games.

== Gallery ==
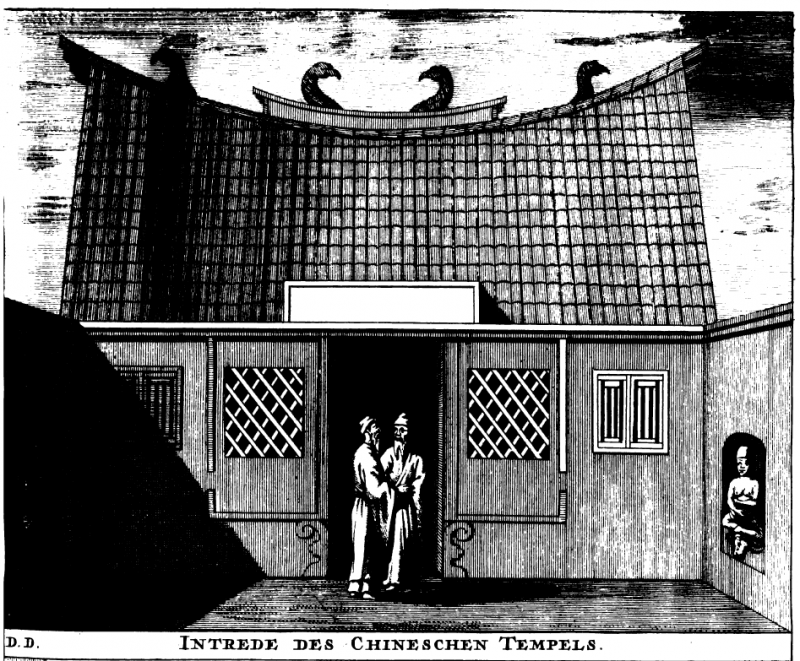
Kim Tek Ie Temple around 1700 by François Valentyn

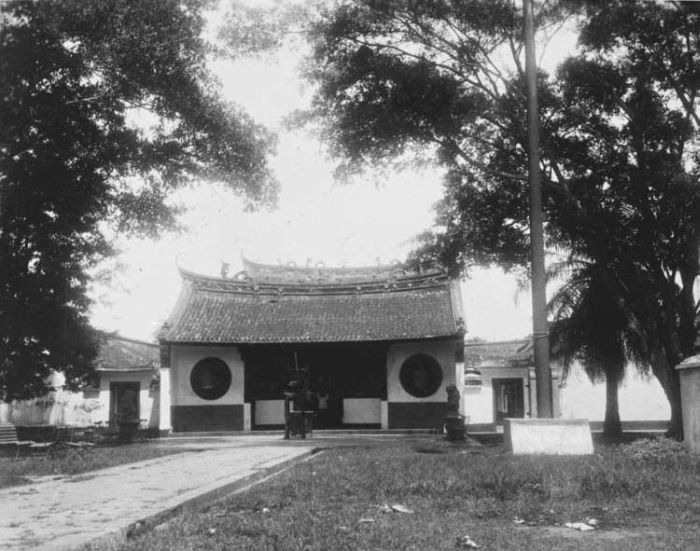
Vihara Dharma Bhakti in 1932

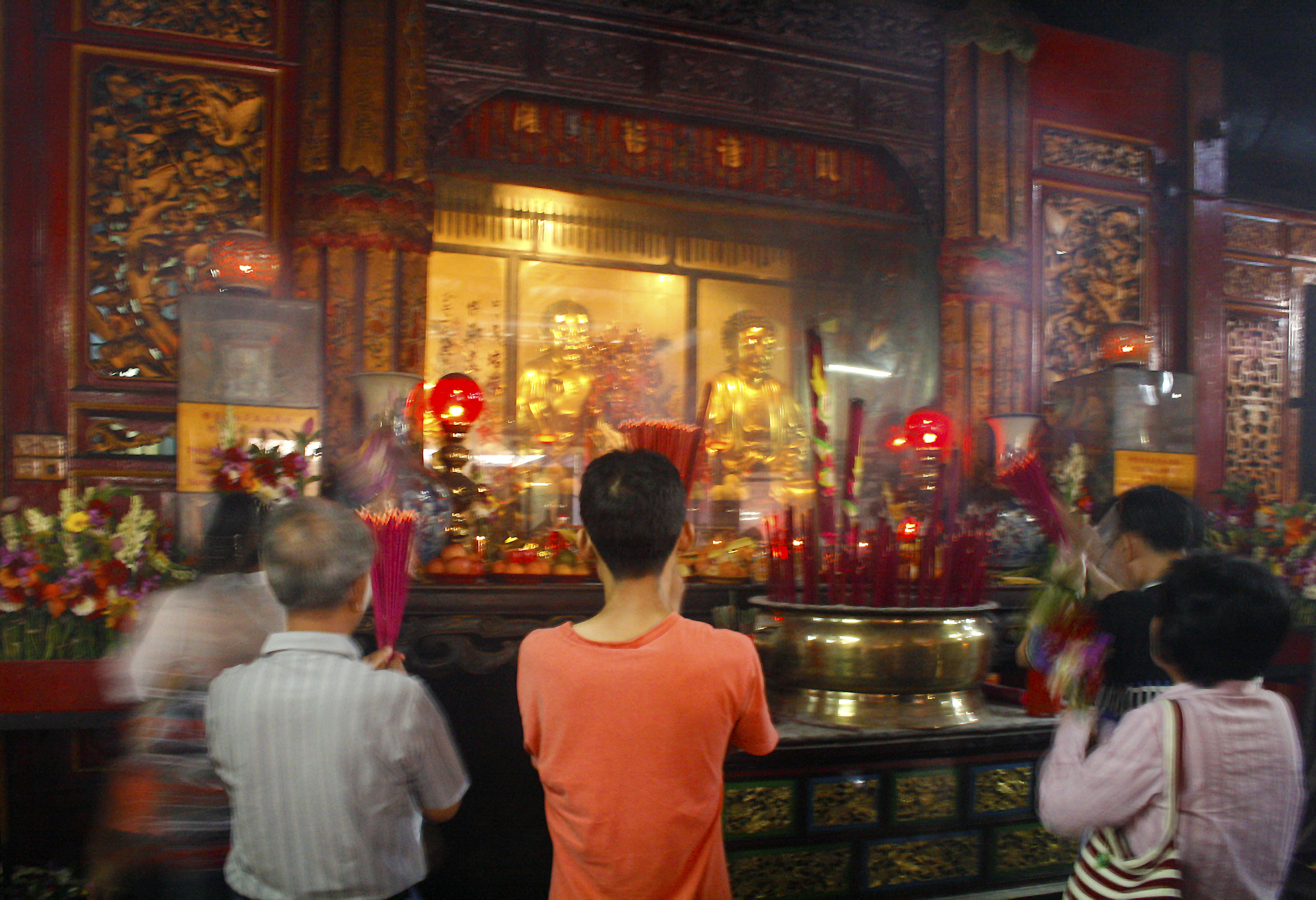
The main altar of Jin De Yuan prior to the 2015 fire.

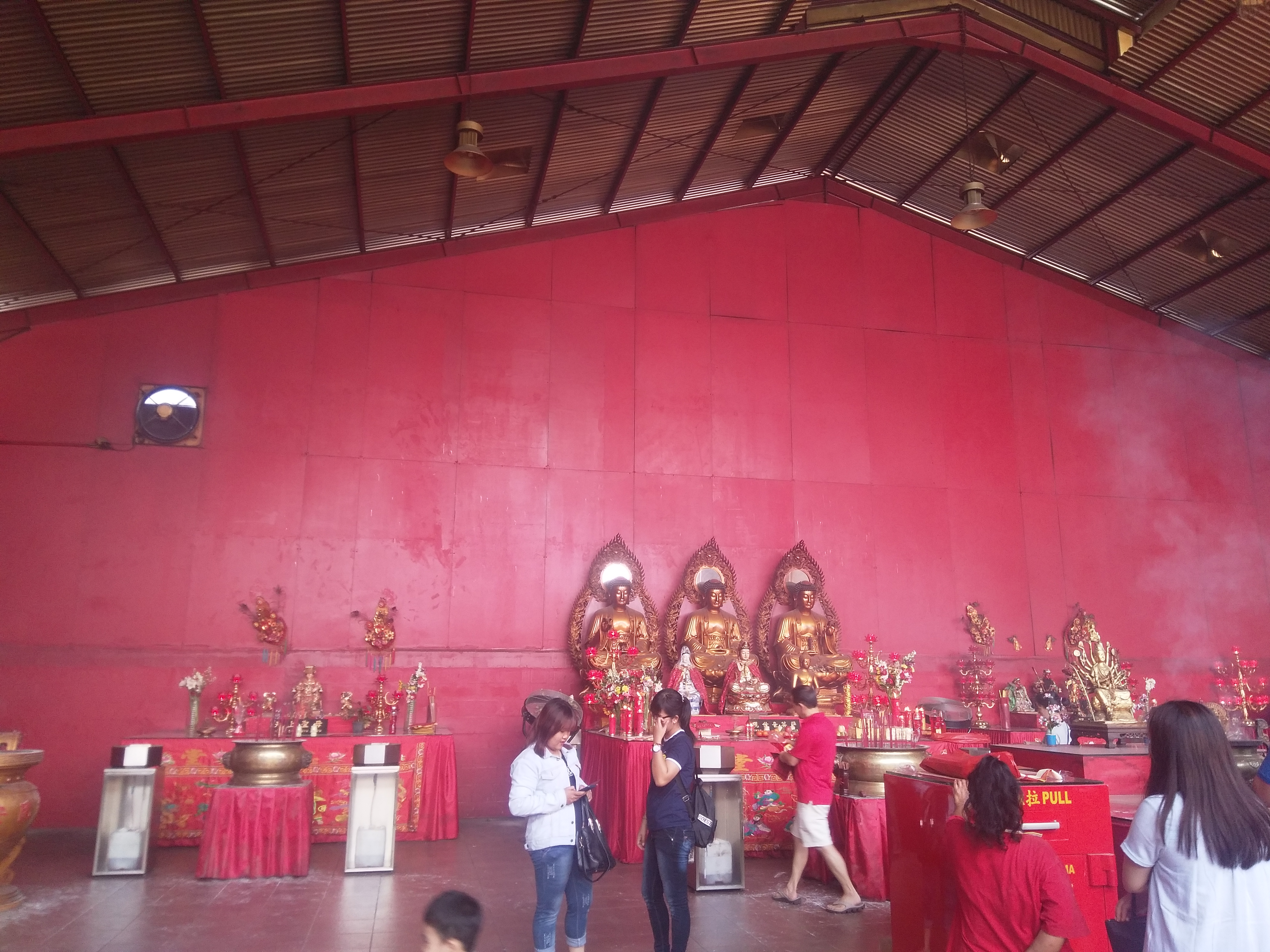
The main altar (2019).

== See also ==
- Vihara Bahtera Bhakti (安卒大伯公廟), Jakarta
- Boen Tek Bio (文德廟), Tangerang
- Tay Kak Sie Temple (大覺寺), Semarang
- Sanggar Agung (宏善堂), Surabaya
- Hoo Ann Kiong Temple (護安宮), Riau
- Ban Hin Kiong Temple (萬興宮), Manado
- Gunung Timur Temple (東嶽觀), Medan
- Satya Dharma Temple (保安宮), Bali

== Cited works ==
- Akihary, Huib (1990). Architectuur & Stedebouw in Indonesië 1870/1970. Zutphen: De Walburg Pers. ISBN 9072691024.
- Ensiklopedi Jakarta (2010). "Dharma Bhakti, Vihara" (in Indonesian). Dinas Komunikasi, Informatika dan Kehumasan Pemprov DKI Jakarta. Archived from the original on November 14, 2016.
- Lohanda, Mona (1994). The Kapitan Cina of Batavia, 1837–1942: A History of Chinese Establishment in Colonial Society. Jakarta: Djambatan. ISBN 979-4284-14-9.
- Nio, Joe-lan (2013). Peradaban Tionghoa Selayang Pandang. Jakarta: Kepustakaan Populer Gramedia.
- Salmon, Claudine; Lombard, Denys (2003). Klenteng-klenteng dan masyarakat Tionghoa di Jakarta, Seri gedung-gedung ibadat yang tua di Jakarta. Jakarta: Yayasan Cipta Loka Caraka.
