= Boen Tek Bio =

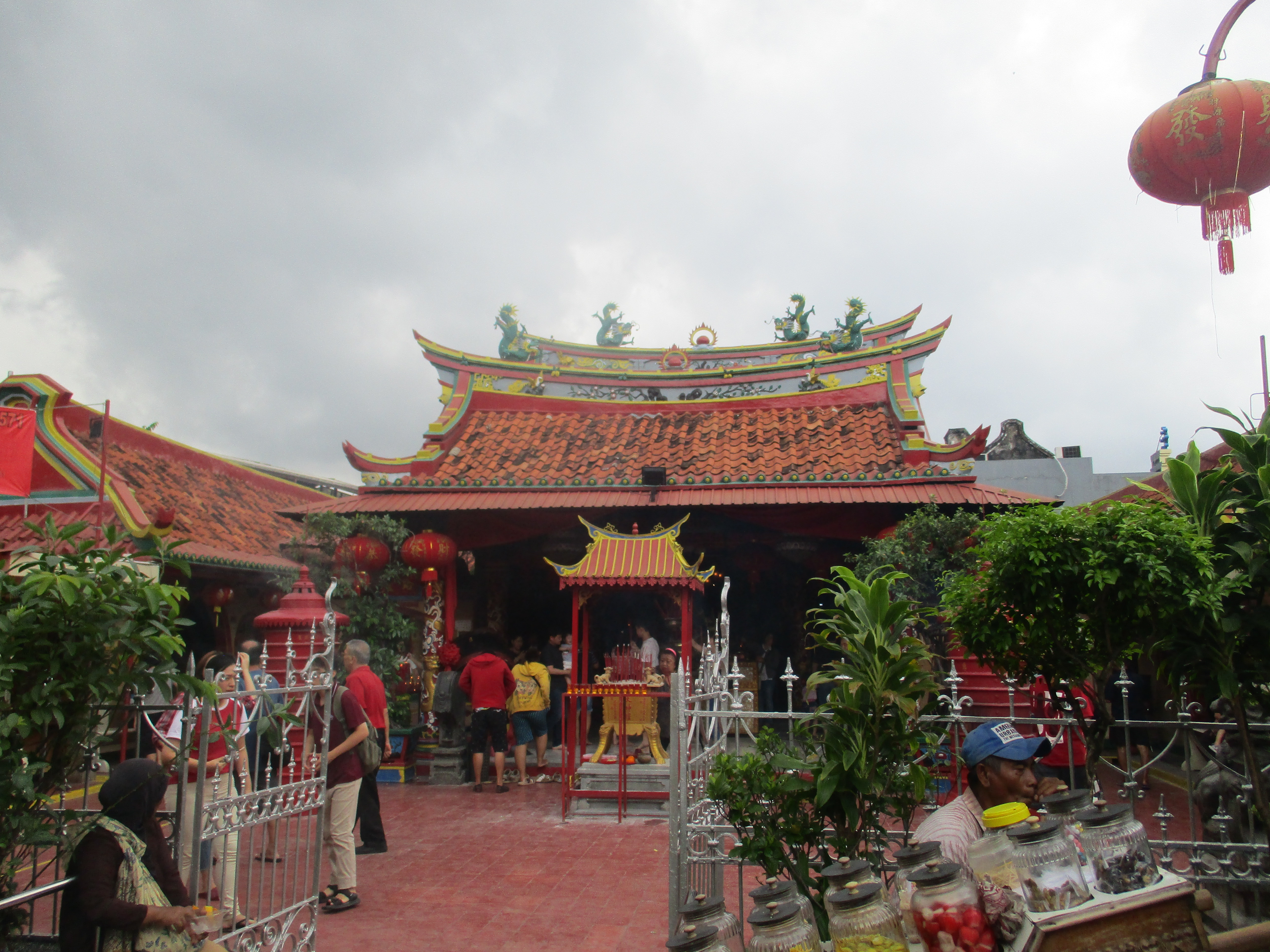
Boen Tek Bio in 2019

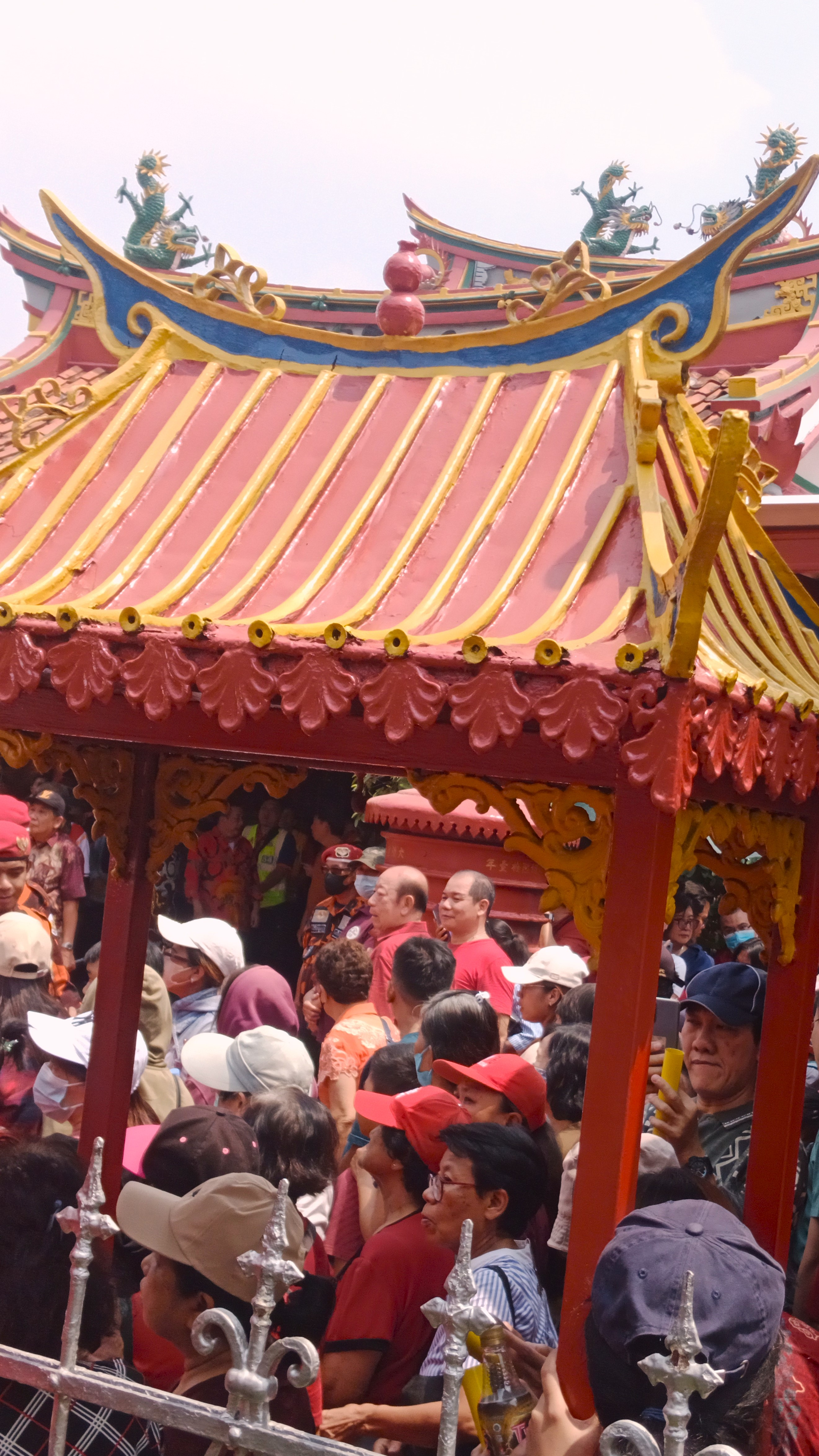
A crowd of people in the temple during the 2024 gotong toapekong ("escorting the Tua Pek Kong") ceremony

Boen Tek Bio (Chinese: 文德廟, English: Temple of Literature and Virtue) is the oldest Chinese temple in Tangerang, Indonesia. It is located at the corner of Jalan Bhakti and Jalan Cilame in the heart of Pasar Lama, Tangerang's old market district.

Founded in 1684, Boen Tek Bio is an intrinsic part of the history of Tangerang, in particular the history of Chinese settlement in the area (see: Benteng Chinese). The oldest part of the present structure dates back to 1775. The temple underwent significant renovation in 1844 with its right and left wings added in 1875, and an inner courtyard in 1904.

Boen Tek Bio has a long history of association with the colonial Chinese bureaucracy ('Kapitan Cina') of Tangerang. The donors for the temple's burial grounds in 1878 include all of the sitting Chinese officers of Tangerang:

- Lim Tjong Hien, Kapitein der Chinezen
- Lim Mo Gie, Luitenant der Chinezen
- Oey Khe Tay, Luitenant der Chinezen
- Tan Tiang Po, Luitenant der Chinezen

The temple foundation received its official government charter on 6 January 1912.

== See also ==
- Kim Tek Ie Temple (金德院), Jakarta
- Vihara Bahtera Bhakti (安卒大伯公廟), Jakarta
- Tay Kak Sie Temple (大覺寺), Semarang
- Sanggar Agung (宏善堂), Surabaya
- Hoo Ann Kiong Temple (護安宮), Riau
- Ban Hin Kiong Temple (萬興宮), Manado
- Gunung Timur Temple (東嶽觀), Medan
- Satya Dharma Temple (保安宮), Bali
