= List of foreign politicians of Chinese descent =

This article contains a list of Wikipedia articles about politicians in countries outside of the Greater China who are of Chinese descent. (Note: Including those of non-Han ethnicities with ancestral homes in Greater China.)

== Monarchs ==
=== Historical monarchs ===
This is a list of monarchs other than the monarchies of Greater China who were/are of either full or partial of Chinese descent or claim so through mythological roots. Despite the presence of historical records, the alleged Chinese descent of some of the following monarchs are contested by modern scholars.

Monarchs of partial or full Chinese ancestry
Name	Realm	Reign	Comments
Kinh Dương Vương 祿續	Vietnam	2879 BC–?	The founder of the legendary Hồng Bàng dynasty, Lộc Tục, was recorded as a descendant of the mythological Chinese ruler Shennong
Jizi 箕子	Korea	1120 BC–?	The founder of the legendary Gija Joseon, Jizi was a mythological Chinese sage from the Shang dynasty who became the ruler of the semi-legendary state of Gojoseon.
Thục Phán 蜀泮	Vietnam	257–179 BC	According to two historical Vietnamese texts, Đại Việt sử ký toàn thư and Khâm định Việt sử Thông giám cương mục, Thục Phán of the Thục dynasty was from modern-day Sichuan, China, where it was previously ruled by the ancient Chinese State of Shu.
Wiman of Gojoseon 衛滿	Korea	194 BC–?	The founder of Wiman Joseon, was a Chinese born General from Yan who fled to Gojoseon and later usurped the native ruler of Gojoseon, Jun of Gojoseon.
Hyeokgeose of Silla 新羅	Korea	57 BC–4 AD	The founder of Silla, Hyeokgeose, was allegedly of partial Chinese descent. His mother, Lady Saso, was supposedly from China and later settled in the Jinhan confederacy. However, Goryeo historian and compiler of the Samguk Sagi, Kim Pusik questioned this tale. All Silla monarchs from the Bak clan were paternal descendants of Hyeokgeose, while those from the Seok clan (with the exception of Talhae) traced their lineage to Hyeokgeose via his granddaughter, Lady Ahyo (阿孝夫人; 아효부인).
Chumo the Holy 高朱蒙	Korea	37–19 BC	The founder of Goguryeo, who according to Samguk sagi, claimed descent from the mythological Chinese ruler Zhuanxu. However, this myth was dismissed in the Samguk Sagi itself.
Onjo 扶餘溫祚	Korea	18 BC–28 AD	The founder of Baekje, Buyeo Onjo, was descended from the ruling family of Goguryeo. However, the myth that the royal Ko family of Koguryo was descended from a mythical Chinese emperor was dismissed in the Samguk Sagi.
Kujula Kadphises 丘就卻	Bactria	30–80 AD	The founder of the Kushan dynasty, Kujula Kadphises, was descended from a lineage of Yuezhi tribe hailing from modern-day Gansu, China.
Phạm Văn 范文	Lâm Ấp	336–349 AD	The founder of Dynasty II of Champa, Phạm Văn, was of Chinese origin.
Lý Bôn 李賁	Vietnam	544–548 AD	The founder of the Early Lý dynasty, Lý Bôn, was descended from Chinese refugees who fled Wang Mang's seizure of power in the final years of the Western Han.
Wang Geon 王建	Korea	918–943 AD	According to the Pyeon Nyeon Tong Rok (編年通錄; 편년통록), Wang Geon was the great-grandson of Emperor Suzong of Tang; according to the Byeon Nyeon Gang Mok (編年綱目; 변년강목), he was the great-grandson of Emperor Xuanzong of Tang. However, the story that Wang Geon was descended from either Suzong or Xuanzong was dismissed in the Goryeo Sa.
Lý Công Uẩn 李公蘊	Vietnam	1009–1028 AD	The first emperor of the Lý dynasty, Lý Công Uẩn, could have his paternal bloodline traced to modern-day Fujian, China. Lý Công Uẩn's father, Lý Thuần An, escaped to Quanzhou from Hebei after Lý Công Uẩn's grandfather, Li Song, was wrongly accused of treason and executed by the Emperor Yin of Later Han.
Trần Cảnh 陳煚	Vietnam	1226–1258 AD	The origin of the Trần dynasty was traced to modern Fujian, where the ancestor of the Trần imperial clan, Trần Kính, migrated from in the 11th century.
Sukaphaa 蘇卡法	Assam	1228–1268 AD	The founder of the Ahom dynasty, Sukaphaa, was originally from modern-day Yunnan, China.
Uthong 烏通	Siam	1350–1370 AD	Uthong, the first king of Ayutthaya Kingdom, was an ethnic Chinese. This was also mentioned in a 17th-century account by Jeremias van Vliet.
Hồ Quý Ly 胡季犛	Vietnam	1400–1407 AD	The founders of the Hồ dynasty claimed descent from the Duke Hu of Chen, the founder of the ancient Chinese State of Chen. The Duke Hu of Chen was in turn descended from the legendary Emperor Shun, who was recognized by Hồ Quý Ly as the progenitor of the Hồ imperial family. The Hồ family migrated from present-day Zhejiang, China to Vietnam under Hồ Hưng Dật during the 10th century.
Trần Ngỗi 陳頠	Vietnam	1407–1413 AD	The Later Trần dynasty was ruled by the same imperial clan as the earlier Trần dynasty. Trần Ngỗi, the founder of the Later Trần dynasty, was a son of the ninth Trần monarch, Trần Phủ.
Liang Daoming 梁道明	Palembang	14th century–15th century AD	
Mạc Cửu 鄚玖	Principality of Hà Tiên	1707–1736 AD	The founder of the Principality of Hà Tiên, Mạc Cửu, was a Chinese from Leizhou, China.
Taksin 達信	Siam	1767–1782 AD	The founder and only king of the Thonburi dynasty, Taksin, had Chinese, Thai, and Mon ancestry. His father, Zheng Yong, was a Teochew Chinese from Chenghai, China.
Nguyễn Nhạc 阮岳	Vietnam	1778–1788 AD	Rulers of the Tây Sơn dynasty, initially surnamed Hồ, were descended from the same line as the Hồ dynasty.
Piang Tan 陳皮昂	Maguindanao people	19th to 20th Century AD	The founder of the House of Piang, Piang Tan, was of mixed Chinese and Maguindanaon heritage. His father, Tuya Tan, was from Amoy, China.
Ang Sar 安紹	Cambodia	1927–1941 AD	Sisowath Monivong (r. 1927–1941), the second and final Cambodian monarch from the House of Sisowath, was of partial Chinese descent. His mother, Varni Van (萬妃; សម្តេចព្រះវររាជនីវ៉ាន់), was a Chinese Cambodian.

=== Modern monarchs ===
This is a list current monarchs other than the monarchies of Greater China who are of full or partial Chinese descent.

Modern monarchs of partial or full Chinese ancestry
Chakri dynasty 扎克里王朝	Siam/Thailand	AD 1782–present	Thongduang 通鑾	The founder of the Chakri dynasty, Thongduang, was of mixed Chinese and Mon descent. His mother, Daoreung, was partially Chinese.	(list) (tree)
House of Norodom 諾羅敦王朝	Cambodia	AD 1860–1904, AD 1941–1970, AD 1993–present	Ang Voddey 安瓦戴	Cambodian monarchs of the House of Norodom acquired Chinese heritage from Varni Van (萬妃; សម្តេចព្រះវររាជនីវ៉ាន់), a Chinese Cambodian consort of Sisowath. She was the maternal great-grandmother of Norodom Sihanouk (r. 1941–1955, 1993–2004) and the paternal great-great-grandmother of Norodom Sihamoni (r. 2004–present), the reigning Cambodian king.	(list) (tree)
House of Temenggong 天猛公王朝	Johor	AD 1886–present	Abu Bakar 阿布·峇卡	Johor monarchs of the House of Temenggong acquired Chinese heritage from Cecilia Catherina Lange, the second wife of Abu Bakar with Chinese and Danish ancestry. Ibrahim (r. 1895–1959) and all subsequent Johor sultans, including the reigning Ibrahim Ismail (r. 2010–present), are descended from Lange.	(list) (tree)

== Other politicians ==
This is a list of politicians who were/are not heads of state and heads of government outside of Greater China of partial or full Chinese heritage. Entries are sorted according to alphabetical order.

=== Australia ===
- Alec Fong Lim
- Bernice Pfitzner
- Bill O'Chee
- David Wang
- Dio Wang
- Ernest Wong
- Gai Brodtmann
- Gladys Liu
- Harry Chan
- Helen Bullock
- Helen Sham-Ho
- Henry Tsang
- Hong Lim
- Ian Goodenough
- Jack Ah Kit
- Jenny Leong
- Jing Lee
- John So
- Katrina Fong Lim
- Michael Choi
- Michael Johnson
- Ngaree Ah Kit
- Penny Wong
- Peter Wong
- Pierre Yang
- Tsebin Tchen

=== Belize ===
- Eric Chang
- Lee Mark Chang
- William Quinto

=== Brunei ===
- Adina binti Othman
- Amin Liew Abdullah
- Goh King Chin
- Hong Kok Tin
- Lau How Teck
- Lim Jock Hoi
- Lim Jock Seng
- Ong Tiong Oh
- Roderick Yong
- Steven Chong Wan Oon
- Queenie Chong

=== Cambodia ===
- Cham Prasidh
- Chan Sarun
- Eng Chhai Eang
- Hok Lundy
- Hong Sun Huot
- Hou Yuon
- Hu Nim
- Hun Manet
- Hun Many
- Im Chhun Lim
- Kang Kek Iew
- Keo Puth Rasmey
- Khem Veasna
- Khy Taing Lim
- Kuoch Ky
- Lon Non
- Norodom Rattana Devi
- Roland Eng
- Sam Rainsy
- Sam Sary
- So Khun
- Sok An
- Suy Sem
- Ta Mok
- Tioulong Saumura

=== Canada ===
- Adrienne Clarkson
- Alan Lowe
- Alice Wong
- Anne Kang
- Arnold Chan
- Art Lee
- Bhutila Karpoche
- Billy Pang
- Bob Wong
- Cathy Wong
- Chin Lee
- Chungsen Leung
- Cynthia Lai
- Daisy Wai
- David Lam
- David Xiao
- Denzil Minnan-Wong
- Dicki Chhoyang
- Dorothy Kostrzewa
- Doug Bing
- Douglas Jung
- Gary Mar
- Geng Tan
- George Chow
- George Ho Lem
- Gordon Chong
- Han Dong
- Henry Woo
- Ida Chong
- Inky Mark
- Jason Luan
- Jean B. Lumb
- Jean Yip
- Jenny Kwan
- John Yap
- Josephine Pon
- Katrina Chen
- Kelvin Ng
- Kenny Chiu
- Kerry Jang
- Kristyn Wong-Tam
- Laurin Liu
- Lillian Dyck
- Mary Ng
- Mary-Woo Sims
- Meili Faille
- Michael Chan
- Michael Chong
- Michael Lee
- Norman Kwong
- Olivia Chow
- Patrick Wong
- Peter Wing
- Peter Wong
- Philip S. Lee
- Raymond Chan
- Raymond Louie
- Richard Lee
- Sean Chu
- Shaun Chen
- Shirley Hoy
- Simon De Jong
- Soo Wong
- Sophia Leung
- Tany Yao
- Ted Hsu
- Teresa Wat
- Teresa Woo-Paw
- Thomas Dang
- Tony Tang
- Tony Wong
- Victor Oh
- Vincent Ke
- Vivienne Poy
- Ying Hope
- Yuen Pau Woo
- Wai Young

=== Estonia ===
- Mihhail Kõlvart

=== Fiji ===
- Dixon Seeto
- James Ah Koy
- Kenneth Low
- Pio Wong
- William Yee

=== France ===
- Buon Tan
- Jeanne d'Hauteserre

=== Gabon ===
- Jean Ping

=== Guam ===
- Antonio Borja Won Pat
- Douglas Moylan
- Judith Won Pat
- Kaleo Moylan
- Kurt Moylan

=== Guatemala ===
- Lucrecia Hernández Mack
- Marco Antonio Yon Sosa

=== Guyana ===
- Arthur Chung
- Robert Victor Evan Wong

=== Honduras ===
- William Chong Wong

=== Indonesia ===
- Agustina Hermanto
- Alvin Lie
- Amir Syamsuddin
- Andrei Angouw
- Angela Tanoesoedibjo
- Basuki Tjahaja Purnama
- Basuri Tjahaja Purnama
- Benny Laos
- Bob Hasan
- Charles Honoris
- Christiandy Sanjaya
- Darmadi Durianto
- Edward Tannur
- Enggartiasto Lukita
- Erick Thohir
- Grace Natalie
- Han Bwee Kong
- Han Chan Piet
- Han Oen Lee
- Hary Tanoesoedibjo
- Henk Ngantung
- Hidayat Arsani
- Hok Hoei Kan
- Ignasius Jonan
- Jusuf Wanandi
- Khouw Kim An
- Khouw Tian Sek
- Kwik Kian Gie
- Lauw Tek Lok
- Lie Kiat Teng
- Lie Tjoe Hong
- Loa Sek Hie
- Mari Elka Pangestu
- Mochammad Anton
- Oei Tiong Ham
- Oey Bian Kong
- Oey Djie San
- Oey Giok Koen
- Oey Khe Tay
- Ong Eng Die
- Phoa Beng Gan
- Phoa Liong Gie
- Ria Norsan
- Rusdi Kirana
- Sherly Tjoanda
- Siauw Giok Tjhan
- Soero Pernollo
- Sofyan Tan
- Souw Beng Kong
- Tan Eng Goan
- Tan Po Goan
- Tan Tjoen Tiat
- Thio Thiam Tjong
- Thomas Lembong
- Thung Sin Nio
- Tio Tek Ho
- Tjong A Fie
- Tjong Yong Hian
- Tjung Tin Jan
- Veronica Tan
- William Aditya Sarana
- Yap Tjwan Bing
- Yenny Wahid

=== Ireland ===
- Hazel Chu

=== Jamaica ===
- Delroy Chuck
- Horace Chang
- Rose Leon

=== Japan ===
- Chōsokabe Kunichika
- Chōsokabe Morichika
- Chōsokabe Motochika
- Yuichiro Hata (surname Hata)
- Keiichi Inamine (surname Inamine)
- Kiyuna Tsugumasa
- Li Dan
- Hirokazu Nakaima (surname Nakaima)
- Renhō

=== Kiribati ===
- Harry Tong

=== Korea ===
- Wi Man
- Shuang Ji

=== Laos ===
- Phoumi Nosavan
- Quinim Pholsena

=== Malaysia ===
- Alice Lau
- Anuar Tan Abdullah
- Anthony Loke
- Bong Kee Chok
- Cha Kee Chin
- Chan Foong Hin
- Chan Kong Choy
- Chan Ming Kai
- Chang Lih Kang
- Chen Tien
- Chen Man Hin
- Chew Hoong Ling
- Chew Mei Fun
- Chin Peng
- Chong Chieng Jen
- Chong Eng
- Chong Hon Nyan
- Chong Sin Woon
- Choong Shiau Yoon
- Chor Chee Heung
- Chow Kon Yeow
- Christina Liew
- Chua Jui Meng
- Chua Soi Lek
- Chua Soon Bui
- Chua Tee Yong
- Chua Tian Chang
- Chung Keng Quee
- Chung Kok Ming
- Chung Thye Phin
- Daniel Wa Wai How
- David E. L. Choong
- Ding Kuong Hiing
- Edmund Chong Ket Wah
- Elizabeth Wong
- Er Teck Hwa
- Fan Yew Teng
- Fatimah Abdullah
- Fong Chan Onn
- Fong Kui Lun
- Fong Po Kuan
- Frankie Gan
- Gan Peck Cheng
- Gan Ping Sieu
- George Chan Hong Nam
- Goh Hock Guan
- Goh Leong San
- Gooi Hsiao Leung
- H. S. Lee
- Hannah Yeoh
- Hee Loy Sian
- Hee Tien Lai
- Hiew King Cheu
- Hoh Khai Mun
- Hou Kok Chung
- Howard Lee Chuan How
- Hsing Yin Shean
- James Wong Kim Min
- Jeff Ooi
- Julian Tan
- June Leow
- Kathleen Wong
- Kelvin Yii Lee Wuen
- Kerk Choo Ting
- Kerk Kim Hock
- Khoo Poay Tiong
- Khoo Soo Seang
- Ko Chung Sen
- Koh Lay Huan
- Koh Nai Kwong
- Koh Tsu Koon
- Kong Cho Ha
- Lai Meng Chong
- Lai Teck
- Larry Sng
- Lau Pak Khuan
- Lau Yew
- Law Choo Kiang
- Law Hieng Ding
- Lee Boon Chye
- Lee Chee Leong
- Lee Hwa Beng
- Lee Kim Sai
- Lee Kim Shin
- Lee Lam Thye
- Lee Loy Seng
- Lee San Choon
- Lee Yoon Thim
- Lee Meng
- Leong Fee
- Leong Yew Koh
- Liang Teck Meng
- Liew Chin Tong
- Liew Vui Keong
- Lim Ah Lek
- Lim Ah Siang
- Lim Boo Chang
- Lim Chong Eu
- Lim Guan Eng
- Lim Keng Yaik
- Lim Kit Siang
- Lim Lip Eng
- Lim Swee Aun
- Linda Tsen
- Ling Liong Sik
- Liow Tiong Lai
- Liu Shan Bang
- Loh Gwo Burne
- Lye Siew Weng
- Mah Hang Soon
- Mah Siew Keong
- Maria Chin Abdullah
- Mary Yap
- Maszlee Malik
- Michael Chen
- Michael Teo Yu Keng
- Mohamad Fatmi Che Salleh
- Mohammad Nizar Jamaluddin
- Mohamed Rahmat
- Nathaniel Tan
- Ng Wei Aik
- Ng Yen Yen
- Nga Kor Ming
- Ngeh Koo Ham
- Noor Hisham Abdullah
- Nur Jazlan Mohamed
- Nurul Izzah Anwar
- Ong Ka Chuan
- Ong Ka Ting
- Ong Kee Hui
- Ong Kian Ming
- Ong Tee Keat
- Ong Tiang Swee
- Ong Yoke Lin
- Oscar Ling
- Pang Hok Liong
- Paul Leong Khee Seong
- Peter Chin Fah Kui
- Peter Lo Sui Yin
- Poh Ah Tiam
- Richard Ho
- Robert Lau
- Seah Tee Heng
- Sebastian Ting Chiew Yew
- See Chee How
- Sim Kui Hian
- Sim Tong Him
- Sim Tze Tzin
- Soh Chin Aun
- Stephen Kalong Ningkan
- Stephen Yong Kuet Tze
- Steven Sim
- Su Keong Siong
- Suriani Abdullah
- Tan Ah Eng
- Tan Chai Ho
- Tan Chee Khoon
- Tan Cheng Lock
- Tan Hiok Nee
- Tan Kee Kwong
- Tan Kee Soon
- Tan Kok Wai
- Tan Koon Swan
- Tan Lian Hoe
- Tan Seng Giaw
- Tan Siew Sin
- Tan Tee Beng
- Tan Tong Hye
- Tan Yee Kew
- Tang Heap Seng
- Tee Hock Seng
- Tee Siew Kiong
- Teh Chai Aan
- Teh Kok Lim
- Teng Boon Soon
- Teo Kok Seong
- Teo Nie Ching
- Teresa Kok
- Ting Chew Peh
- Tiong King Sing
- Tiong Thai King
- Tony Pua
- Victor Gu
- Violet Yong
- Vivian Wong Shir Yee
- Wee Choo Keong
- Wee Jeck Seng
- Wee Ka Siong
- William Leong
- Wong Chen
- Wong Foon Meng
- Wong Ho Leng
- Wong Hon Wai
- Wong Kah Woh
- Wong Ling Biu
- Wong Pow Nee
- Wong Sai Hou
- Wong Shu Qi
- Wong Soon Koh
- Wong Sze Phin
- Wong Tack
- Wong Tien Fatt
- Yap Ah Loy
- Yap Ah Shak
- Yap Kwan Seng
- Yap Pian Hon
- Yeo Bee Yin
- Yeow Chai Thiam
- Yeung Kwo
- Yong Khoon Seng
- Yong Teck Lee
- Zairil Khir Johari

=== Mauritius ===
- Joseph Tsang Mang Kin
- Moilin Jean Ah-Chuen
- Yeung Kam John Yeung Sik Yuen

=== Mexico ===
- Miguel Ángel Osorio Chong

=== Myanmar ===
- Aung Gyi
- Bai Xuoqian
- Bao Youxiang
- Edward Michael Law-Yone
- Kyi Maung
- Ohn Myint
- Pheung Kya-shin
- Sai Leun
- Sandar Win
- Soe Moe Thu
- Tan Yu Sai
- Yang Mao-liang

=== The Netherlands ===
- Ing Yoe Tan
- Khee Liang Phoa
- Mei Li Vos
- Roy Ho Ten Soeng
- Varina Tjon-A-Ten

=== Timor-Leste ===
- Francisco Kalbuadi Lay
- Maria Fernanda Lay

=== New Zealand ===
- Jian Yang
- Kenneth Wang
- Meng Foon
- Naisi Chen
- Pansy Wong
- Peter Chin
- Raymond Huo

=== Norway ===
- Julia Wong

=== Pakistan ===
- Hakim Said

=== Papua New Guinea ===
- Byron Chan
- Walter Schnaubelt

=== Peru ===
- Enrique Wong Pujada
- Humberto Lay
- José Antonio Chang
- Víctor Joy Way
- Víctor Polay

=== Poland ===
- Aleksandra Wiśniewska

=== The Philippines ===
- Abdusakur Mahail Tan
- Abraham Tolentino
- Alberto Lim
- Alfonso Yuchengco
- Alfredo Lim
- Alice Guo
- Amelia Gordon
- Ananias Laico
- Antonio Tinio
- Arnold Atienza
- Arsenio Lacson
- Arthur C. Yap
- Betty Go-Belmonte
- Bong Go
- Chel Diokno
- Claudio Teehankee
- Corazon Aquino
- Danding Cojuangco
- Danilo Lim
- Dennis Uy
- Dino Reyes Chua
- Francis Escudero
- Francis Garchitorena
- Gemma Cruz-Araneta
- Gilbert Teodoro
- Gina Lopez
- Gregory S. Ong
- Herbert Bautista
- Imee Marcos
- Jaime Ongpin
- Jaime Sin
- Jesse Robredo
- José Cojuangco
- José W. Diokno
- Jose Maria Sison
- Joy Belmonte
- Francis Tolentino
- Lito Atienza
- Lucy Torres-Gomez
- Luis Yangco
- Manuel Tinio
- Marcial Lichauco
- Mark Cojuangco
- Nikki Coseteng
- Panfilo Lacson
- Paolo Duterte
- Pedro Yap
- Peping Cojuangco
- Raul Roco
- Reno Lim
- Rex Gatchalian
- Rogelio de la Rosa
- Ruthlane Uy Asmundson
- Sebastian Duterte
- Wenceslao Vinzons
- Win Gatchalian

=== Ryukyu Kingdom ===
- Jana Ueekata
- Kaiki
- Ō Mō
- Rin Seikō
- Sai On
- Sai Taku
- Tei Fuku
- Tei Junsoku

=== Samoa ===
- Faaolesa Katopau Ainuu
- Muagututagata Peter Ah Him
- Niko Lee Hang
- Sua Rimoni Ah Chong
- Tuala Falani Chan Tung

=== Singapore ===
- Abdullah Tarmugi
- Alex Yam
- Aline Wong
- Alvin Tan
- Alvin Yeo
- Amy Khor
- Ang Hin Kee
- Ang Mong Seng
- Ang Wei Neng
- Ang Yong Guan
- Arthur Fong
- Baey Yam Keng
- Benjamin Pwee
- Carrie Tan
- Cedric Foo
- Chan Choy Siong
- Chan Chun Sing
- Chan Soo Sen
- Charles Chong
- Chay Wai Chuen
- Chee Hong Tat
- Chee Soon Juan
- Chen Show Mao
- Cheng Li Hui
- Cheo Chai Chen
- Cheryl Chan
- Chew Swee Kee
- Chia Shi-Lu
- Chia Thye Poh
- Chiam See Tong
- Chin Harn Tong
- Chin Tet Yung
- Chng Hee Kok
- Choa Chong Long
- Chong Kee Hiong
- Choo Wee Khiang
- Chor Yeok Eng
- Chua Sian Chin
- Cynthia Phua
- Daniel Goh
- Darryl David
- David Ong
- Denise Phua
- Dennis Tan
- Derrick Goh
- Desmond Choo
- Desmond Lee
- Desmond Lim
- Desmond Tan
- Dixie Tan
- Don Wee
- Edward Chia
- Edwin Tong
- Elizabeth Choy
- Ellen Lee
- Eric Chua
- Foo Mee Har
- Fong Swee Suan
- Francis Seow
- Gan Kim Yong
- Gan Siow Huang
- Gan Thiam Poh
- George Yeo
- Gerald Giam
- Goh Meng Seng
- Grace Fu
- Hany Soh
- Hazel Poa
- He Ting Ru
- Heng Chee How
- Henry Kwek
- Ho Geok Choo
- Ho Kah Leong
- Ho Peng Kee
- Hon Sui Sen
- Howe Yoon Chong
- Indranee Rajah
- Irene Ng
- Jamus Lim
- Jek Yeun Thong
- Jessica Tan
- Joan Pereira
- Josephine Teo
- Ker Sin Tze
- Khaw Boon Wan
- Koh Poh Koon
- Koo Tsai Kee
- Lam Pin Min
- Lawrence Wong
- Lee Bee Wah
- Lee Boon Yang
- Lee Chiaw Meng
- Lee Khoon Choy
- Lee Li Lian
- Lee Yi Shyan
- Lee Yock Suan
- Leong Mun Wai
- Lew Syn Pau
- Liang Eng Hwa
- Lily Neo
- Lim Biow Chuan
- Lim Boon Heng
- Lim Chin Siong
- Lim Hng Kiang
- Lim Hwee Hua
- Lim Kim San
- Lim Swee Say
- Lim Tean
- Lim Wee Kiak
- Lina Loh
- Ling How Doong
- Liu Thai Ker
- Loh Miaw Gong
- Louis Chua
- Louis Ng
- Low Thia Khiang
- Low Yen Ling
- Lui Tuck Yew
- Mah Bow Tan
- Matthias Yao
- Melvin Yong
- Nicole Seah
- Ng Chee Meng
- Ng Eng Hen
- Ng Ling Ling
- Ng Pock Too
- Ong Chit Chung
- Ong Eng Guan
- Ong Pang Boon
- Ong Ye Kung
- Ooi Boon Ewe
- Patrick Tay
- Peh Chin Hua
- Penny Low
- Png Eng Huat
- Poh Li San
- Rachel Ong
- Raymond Lim
- Richard Hu
- Sam Tan
- Seah Kian Peng
- Seet Ai Mee
- Seng Han Thong
- Shawn Huang Wei Zhong
- Sim Ann
- Sin Boon Ann
- Sitoh Yih Pin
- Steve Chia
- Sun Xueling
- Sylvia Lim
- Tan Cheng Bock
- Tan Chuan-Jin
- Tan Jee Say
- Tan Kiat How
- Tan Kim Ching
- Tan Kin Lian
- Tan See Leng
- Tan Soo Khoon
- Tan Tock Seng
- Tan Wu Meng
- Tay Eng Soon
- Teh Cheang Wan
- Teo Ho Pin
- Teo Ser Luck
- Tin Pei Ling
- Tony Tan Lay Thiam
- Vivian Balakrishnan
- Walter Woon
- Wan Soon Bee
- Wee Siew Kim
- Xie Yao Quan
- Yee Jenn Jong
- Yeo Cheow Tong
- Yeo Guat Kwang
- Yeo Ning Hong
- Yeo Wan Ling
- Yeoh Ghim Seng
- Yip Hon Weng
- Yong Nyuk Lin
- Yu-Foo Yee Shoon
- Zeng Guoyuan

=== Solomon Islands ===
- Laurie Chan

=== South Africa ===
- Chris Wang
- Eugenia Shi-Chia Chang
- Sherry Chen
- Shiaan-Bin Huang

=== Soviet Union ===
- Magaza Masanchi

=== Thailand ===
- Apirak Kosayodhin
- Bhichit Rattakul
- Chuwit Chitsakul
- Chuwit Kamolvisit
- Giles Ji Ungpakorn
- Jermmas Chuenglertsiri
- Kalaya Sophonpanich
- Kanawat Chantaralawan
- Kantathi Suphamongkhon
- Khaw Soo Cheang
- Khun Phiphit Wathi
- Korn Chatikavanij
- Kraisak Choonhavan
- Luang Wichitwathakan
- Parit Wacharasindhu
- Phraya Ratsadanupradit Mahitsaraphakdi
- Piyabutr Saengkanokkul
- Sudarat Keyuraphan
- Supachai Panitchpakdi
- Thammarak Isarangkura na Ayudhaya
- Thanathorn Juangroongruangkit
- Thepthai Senapong
- Weng Tojirakarn

=== Trinidad and Tobago ===
- Eugene Chen
- Franklin Khan
- Gerald Yetming
- Michael Jay Williams
- Percy Chen
- Ronald Jay Williams
- Solomon Hochoy
- Stuart Young

=== United Kingdom ===
- Alan Mak
- Anna Lo
- George Macartney
- Hsiao Li Lindsay
- Lydia Dunn
- Michael Chan
- Nat Wei
- Sarah Owen
- Steven Dominique Cheung
- Victoria Treadell

=== United States ===
- Aaron Ling Johanson
- Allan Fung
- Alex Sink
- Alex Wan
- Andrew Yang
- Angie Chen Button
- Anna Chennault
- Barry Wong
- Bertha Kawakami
- Betty Tom Chu
- Betty Yee
- Calvin Say
- Carmen Chu
- Carol Liu
- Charles Djou
- Charlie Chong
- Cheryl Chow
- Cheryl Lau
- Chris Lu
- Christian Fong
- Chuck Mau
- Clayton Hee
- Conrad Lee
- Cory Fong
- Daniel Akaka
- David Chiu
- David Kuo
- David M. Louie
- David S. C. Chu
- David Wu
- Derek Kan
- Donald Wong
- Doug Chin
- Duke Aiona
- Ed Chau
- Ed Jew
- Ed Lee
- Edmond Gong
- Edmund C. Moy
- Elaine Chao
- Elisa Chan
- Ellen Young
- Eric Mar
- Ervin Yen
- Evan Low
- Fiona Ma
- Frederick Pang
- Gary Locke
- Gene Wu
- Gordon Lau
- Gordon Quan
- Grace Meng
- Harry Lee
- Hiram Fong
- Isaac Choy
- James C. Ho
- James Kealoha
- Jan C. Ting
- Jean Quan
- Jeff Tien Han Pon
- Jessie Liu
- Jim Chu
- Jimmie R. Yee
- Jimmy Meng
- John B. Tsu
- John Chiang
- John Liu
- Joseph Apukai Akina
- Judy Chu
- Julia Chang Bloch
- Kaniela Ing
- Kansen Chu
- Karen Goh
- Katy Tang
- Kimberly Yee
- Kris Wang
- Lanhee Chen
- Leland Yee
- Lily Qi
- Ling Ling Chang
- Lisa Wong
- Mae Yih
- March Fong Eu
- Margaret Chin
- Martha Wong
- Matt Fong
- Mia Gregerson
- Michael Woo
- Michelle K. Lee
- Michelle Wu
- Mike Eng
- Mike Gin
- Mike Yin
- Ming Chin
- Nancy-Ann DeParle
- Norman Yee
- Otto Lee
- Paul Fong
- Peter Koo
- Phil Ting
- Phillip Chen
- Richard Pan
- Ruby Chow
- Rui Xu
- S. B. Woo
- Sandra Lee Fewer
- Sonia Chang-Díaz
- Stanley Chang
- Stephanie Chang
- Steven Chu
- Sue Chew
- Susan C. Lee
- Suzanne Chun Oakland
- Tammy Duckworth
- Ted Lieu
- Teodoro R. Yangco
- Theresa Mah
- Tina Tchen
- TJ Cox
- Tom Hom
- Tony Hwang
- Vince Fong
- William S. Richardson
- William Tong
- Wilma Chan
- Wing F. Ong
- Wing Luke
- Yiaway Yeh
- Yuh-Line Niou

=== Vietnam ===
- Đỗ Cảnh Thạc
- Nguyễn Khoan
- Nguyễn Siêu
- Nguyễn Thủ Tiệp
- Phan Thanh Giản
- Phan Xích Long
- Trần Lãm
- Trần Văn Lắm

=== Zimbabwe ===
- Fay Chung

== See also ==
- List of heads of state and government of Chinese descent
- Chinese emigration
- European politicians of Chinese descent
- List of Confucian states and dynasties
- List of Kapitan Cina
- List of overseas Chinese
- Overseas Chinese
