= European politicians of Chinese descent =

This is a list of politicians in Europe of Chinese descent:

== France ==
- André Thien Ah Koon 曾宪建 (born in Reunion Island; Hakka ancestry): First Chinese elected to the French National Assembly and the first Chinese elected to a parliament in Europe, 1986–2006
- Buon Tan (born in Phnom Penh, in a Chinese Cambodian family): Member of French National Assembly for Paris's 9th constituency, 2017–2022

== Ireland ==
- Hazel Chu (born in Dublin to Hong Kong Hakka immigrant parents): Deputy Leader of the Green Party (2026–present), member of Dublin City Council (2019–present) and former Lord Mayor of Dublin (2020–2021)

== Netherlands ==
- Khee Liang Phoa 潘科良 (local born; parents migrated from Indonesia): Secretary of State for Emancipation and Family Affairs, 2002–2003
- Ing Yoe Tan 陈英茹 (local born; parents migrated from Indonesia): Member of the Senate, 1998–2011
- Varina Tjon-A-Ten (born in Suriname; mixed blood with paternal Hakka Chinese grandfather from China): Member of the House of Representatives, 2003–2006
- Mei Li Vos (local born; mixed blood with Chinese Indonesian mother): Member of the House of Representatives, 2007–2010, 2012–2017; Member of the Senate, 2019–present
- Roy Ho Ten Soeng 何天送 (born in Suriname; Hakka ancestry): Mayor, Venhuizen, North Holland, 2000–2006; First immigrant Mayor of Netherlands; First Chinese Mayor of Netherlands and Europe

== Poland ==
- Aleksandra Wiśniewska (born in Poland; of mixed Chinese, Polish, and Thai ancestry): Member of the Sejm, 2023–present

== United Kingdom ==
- Lydia Dunn, Baroness Dunn 鄧蓮如 (born in Hong Kong; Zhejiang ancestry): Member of House of Lords, 1990–2010
- Michael Chan, Baron Chan 曾秋坤 (born in Singapore): Member of House of Lords, 2001–2006
- Nat Wei, Baron Wei 韋鳴恩 (local born; parents migrated from Hong Kong; Hakka ancestry): Member of House of Lords, 2010–present
- Anna Lo 盧曼華 (born in British Hong Kong; Cantonese ancestry): Member of Northern Ireland Assembly, 2007–2016
- Alan Mak (local born of Cantonese descent, parents migrated from Guangdong Province via Hong Kong): Member of House of Commons, 2015–present
- Sarah Owen (local born; mixed blood with Chinese mother): Member of House of Commons, 2019–present

== Norway ==
- Julia Wong 黄婧莹 (local born; mother from Guangzhou, father from Hong Kong): Deputy representative to the Parliament of Norway, 2017-2021

== Denmark ==
- Heidi Wang 王立智 (born in Taiwan): City councilor of Copenhagen

== See also ==
- List of politicians of Chinese descent
