= Lệnh Công =

Lệnh Công (chữ Hán: 令公) or Duke Lệnh may refer to:

- Kiều Thuận (fl. 10th century), warlord during the Period of the Twelve Warlords who called himself Kiều Lệnh Công
- Nguyễn Thủ Tiệp (908–967), warlord during the Period of the Twelve Warlords who called himself Nguyễn Lệnh Công
