= Charles J. Kleingrothe =

German photographer (1864–1925)

C.J. Kleingrothe
- Born: Carl Josef Kleingrothe (or Klein-Grothe); 24 September 1864; Krefeld, Kingdom of Prussia
- Died: 25 February 1942 (aged 77); Frankfurt, German Reich
- Known for: Photographs in the Dutch East Indies

Charles J. Kleingrothe (24 September 1864, Krefeld – 25 February 1942, Frankfurt), known professionally as C. J. Kleingrothe, was a German photographer who spent nearly 30 years as a photographer in the Dutch East Indies (present-day Indonesia), as well as in neighbouring British Malaya.

== Biography ==
Kleingrothe was hired by Singapore-based German photographer Gustav Richard Lambert in 1888. They went to Medan on the island of Sumatra, where Kleingrothe met and worked alongside Swedish photographer H. Stafhell. The pair split off from Lambert & Co. and founded their own studio, Stafhell & Kleingrothe, in 1889. Stafhell departed for Singapore in 1897/1898 and Kleingrothe continued the business under the name Kleingrothe Atelier.

Kleingrothe was able to document government parties, the laying of a major railroad line, and the day-to-day life of locals. He captured the production of tobacco, coffee, tea, rubber, and palm oil; landscape and architecture; portraits; and nudes. His photos often captured power dynamics and social class differences, particularly between Europeans and Sumatrans. Many of his photos were commissioned by plantation companies and the colonial empire. When photographing locals, Kleingrothe tended to dress and position them in highly exoticized ways and sold the resulting prints as postcards.

Kleingrothe briefly returned to Europe in the early 1900s and had built up enough of a reputation as an artistic photographer that his albums quickly became valuable. He gifted an album bound in crocodile skin to Queen Wilhelmine of the Netherlands. He returned to Germany permanently in 1915 and retired to Bad Nauheim. He became a landlord and opened a cinema and tobacco business but relocated to Frankfurt with his second wife, Maria, around the time World War II broke out. Kleingrothe died on February 25, 1942, from influenza and atherosclerosis.

== Gallery ==
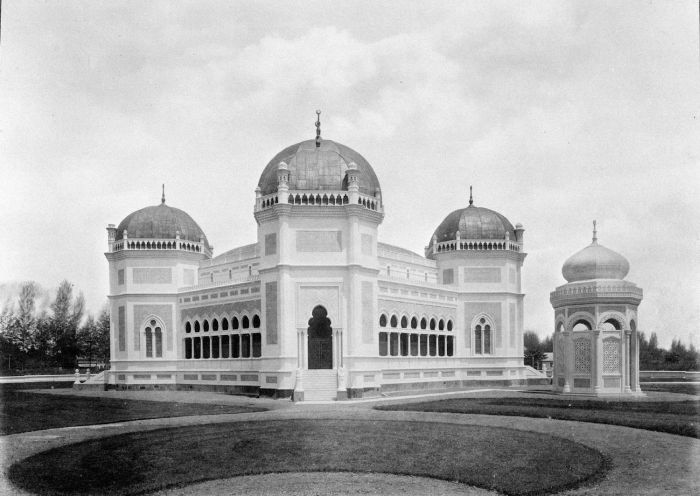
Medan mosque

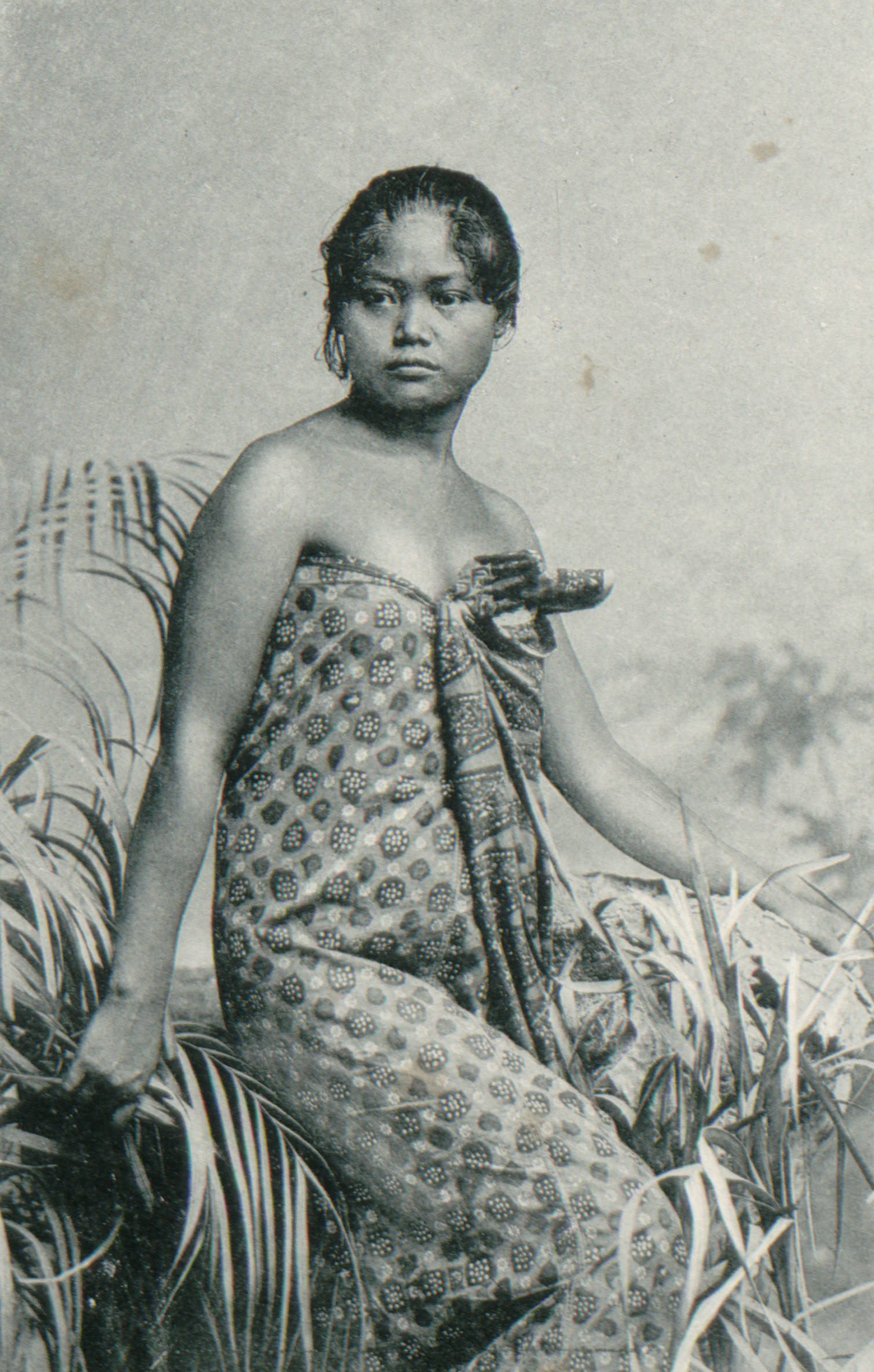
A Javanese woman, c. 1898

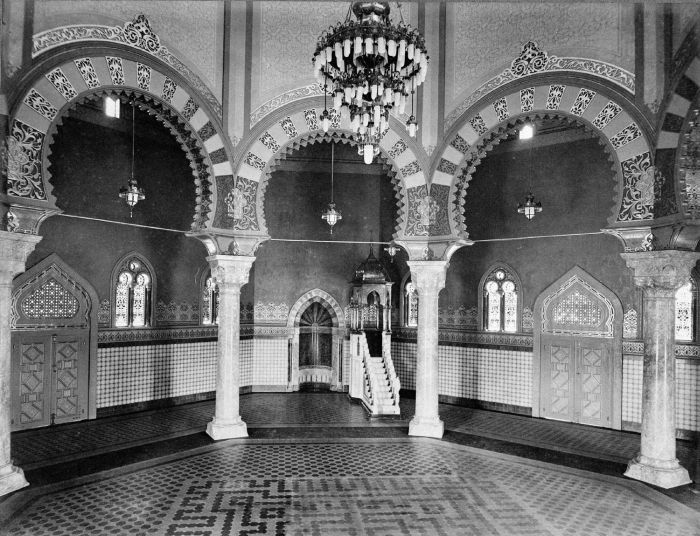
Medan mosque interior

Europeans (standing in white suits) speaking to plantation workers (primarily sitting), c. 1905

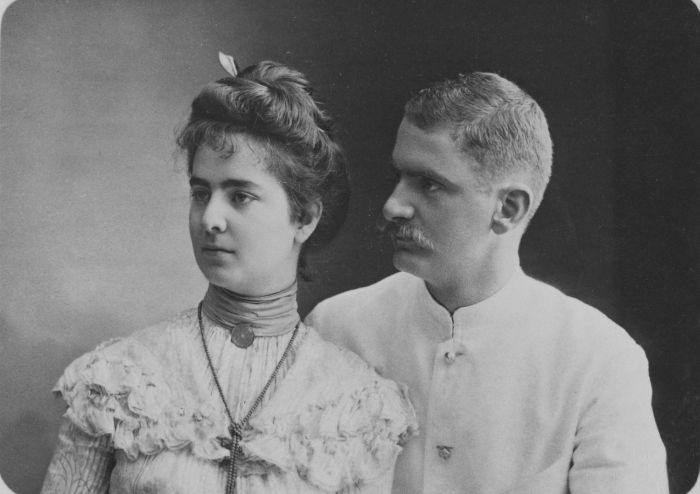
Van Tijen, head administrator of the Deli Company, and his wife

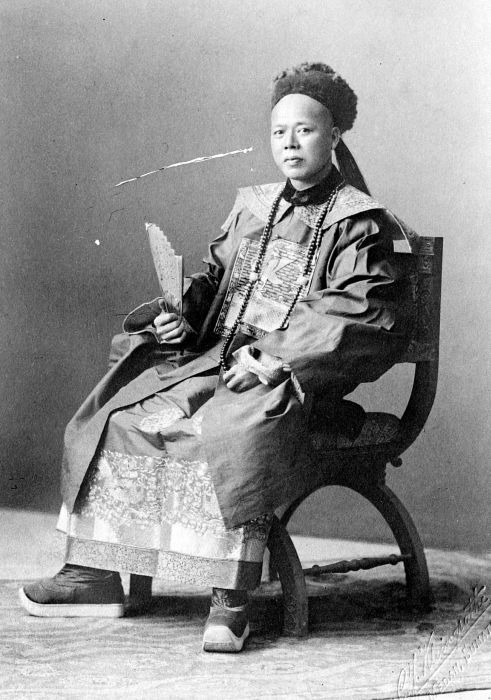
Tjong A Fie, a leader of the Chinese in Medan

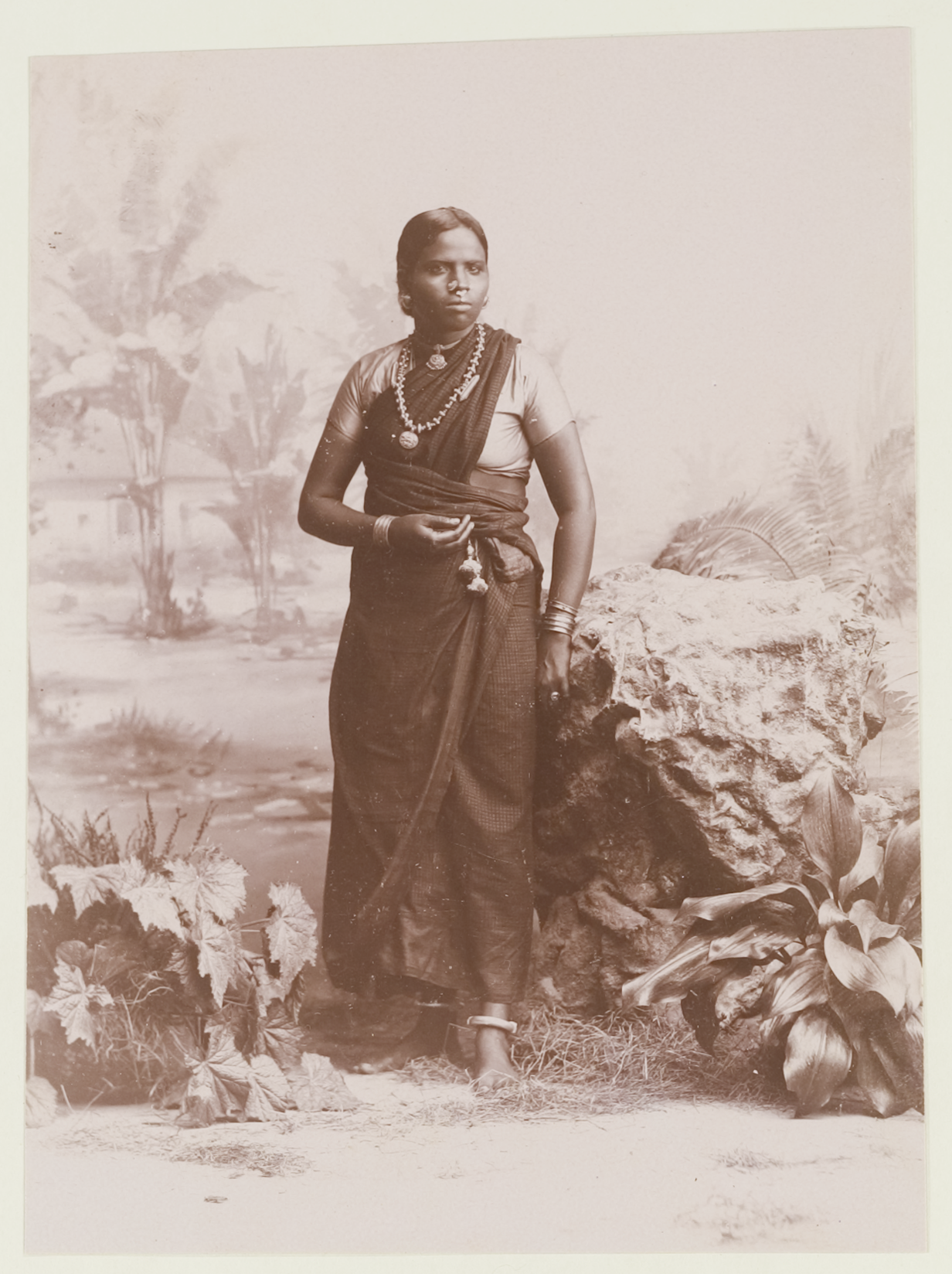
Klingalese woman, c. 1900

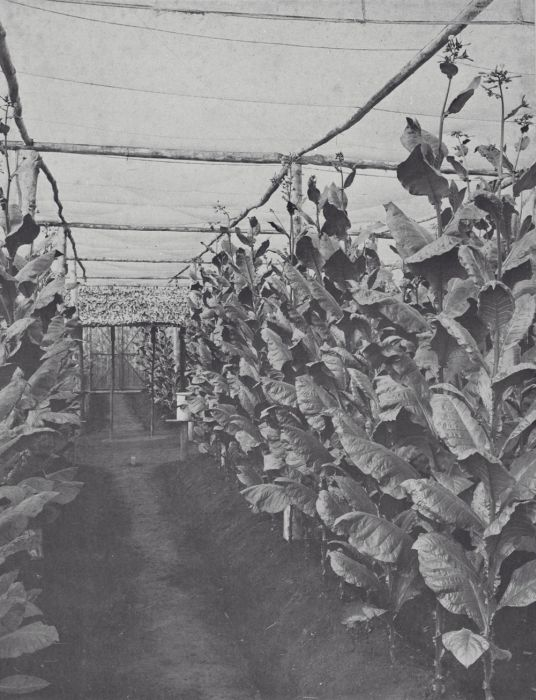
Deli Company tobacco

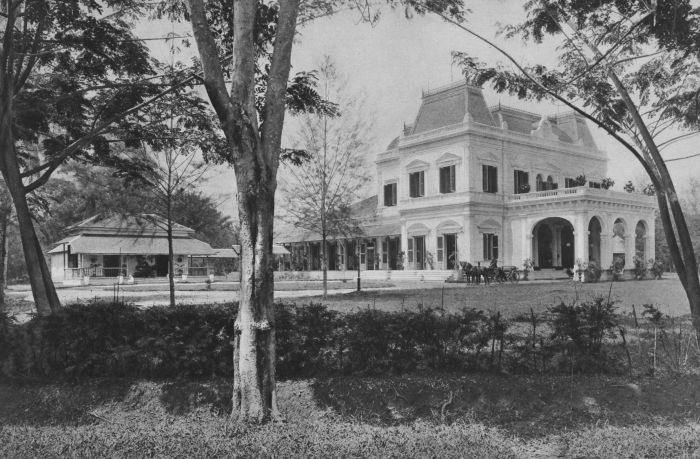
Governor's house

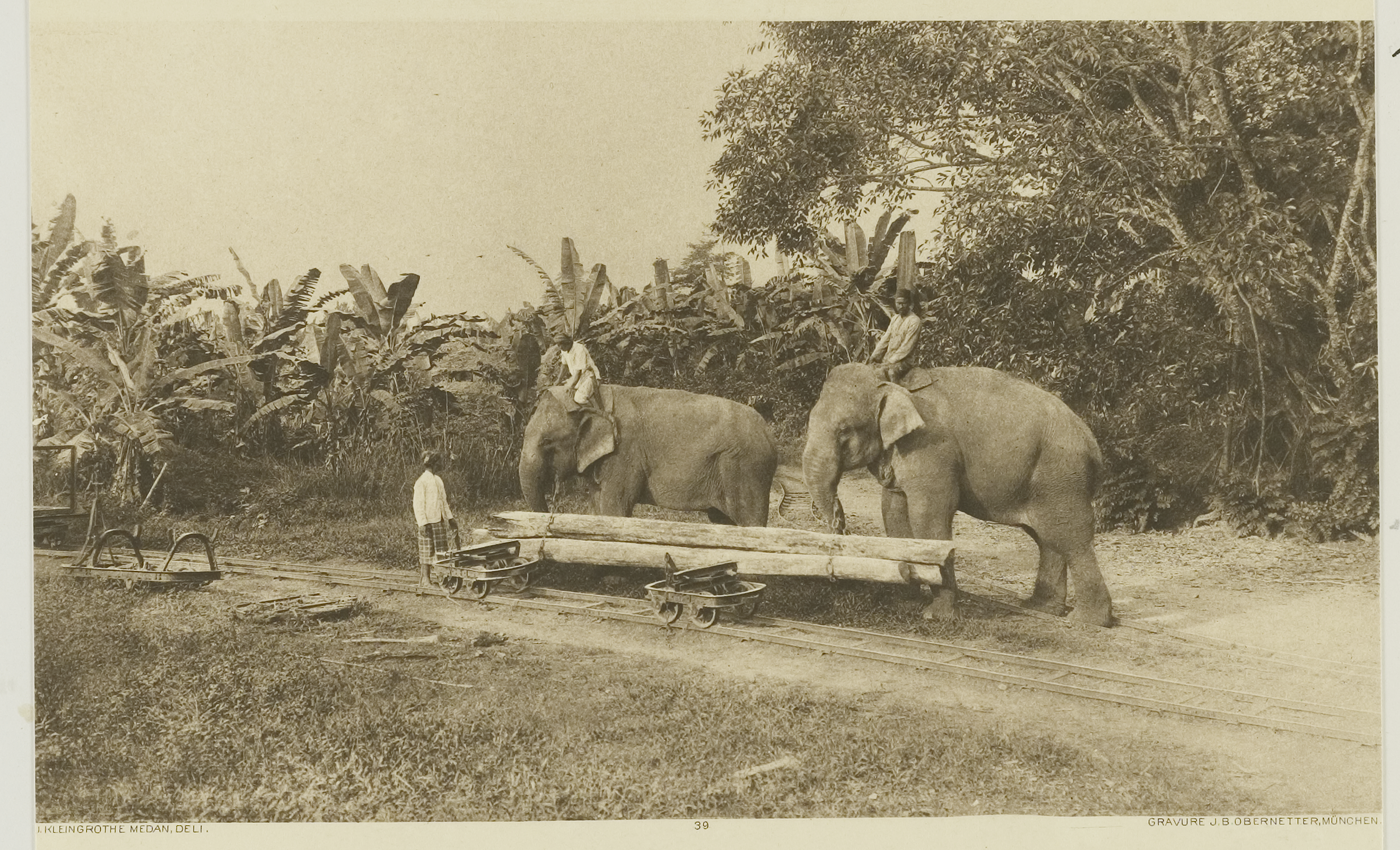
Elephants moving tree trunks, c. 1905
