= Gang Bengkok Old Mosque =

Mosque in Medan, North Sumatra, Indonesia

- Masjid Lama Gang Bengkok مسجد لاما ڬڠ بيڠكوق 明光老巷清真寺
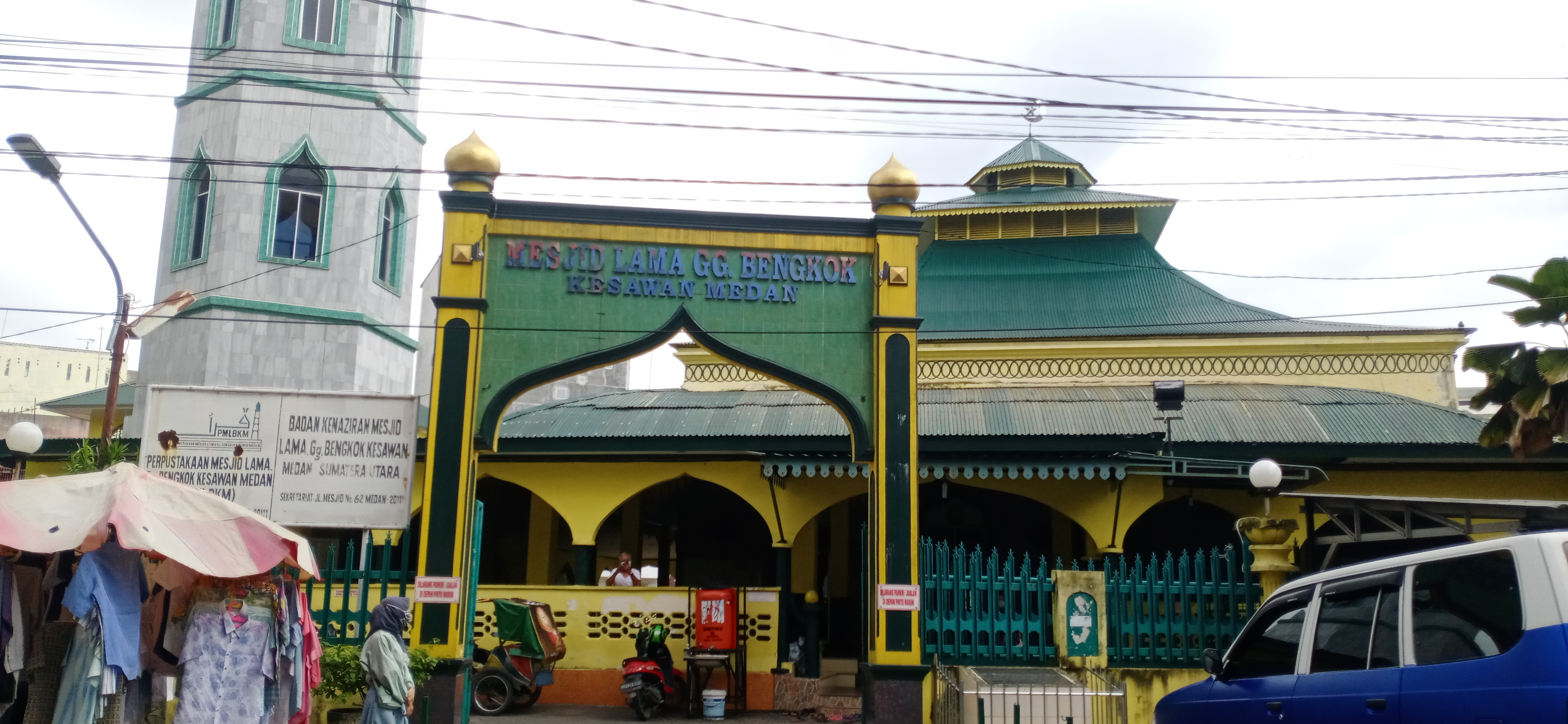

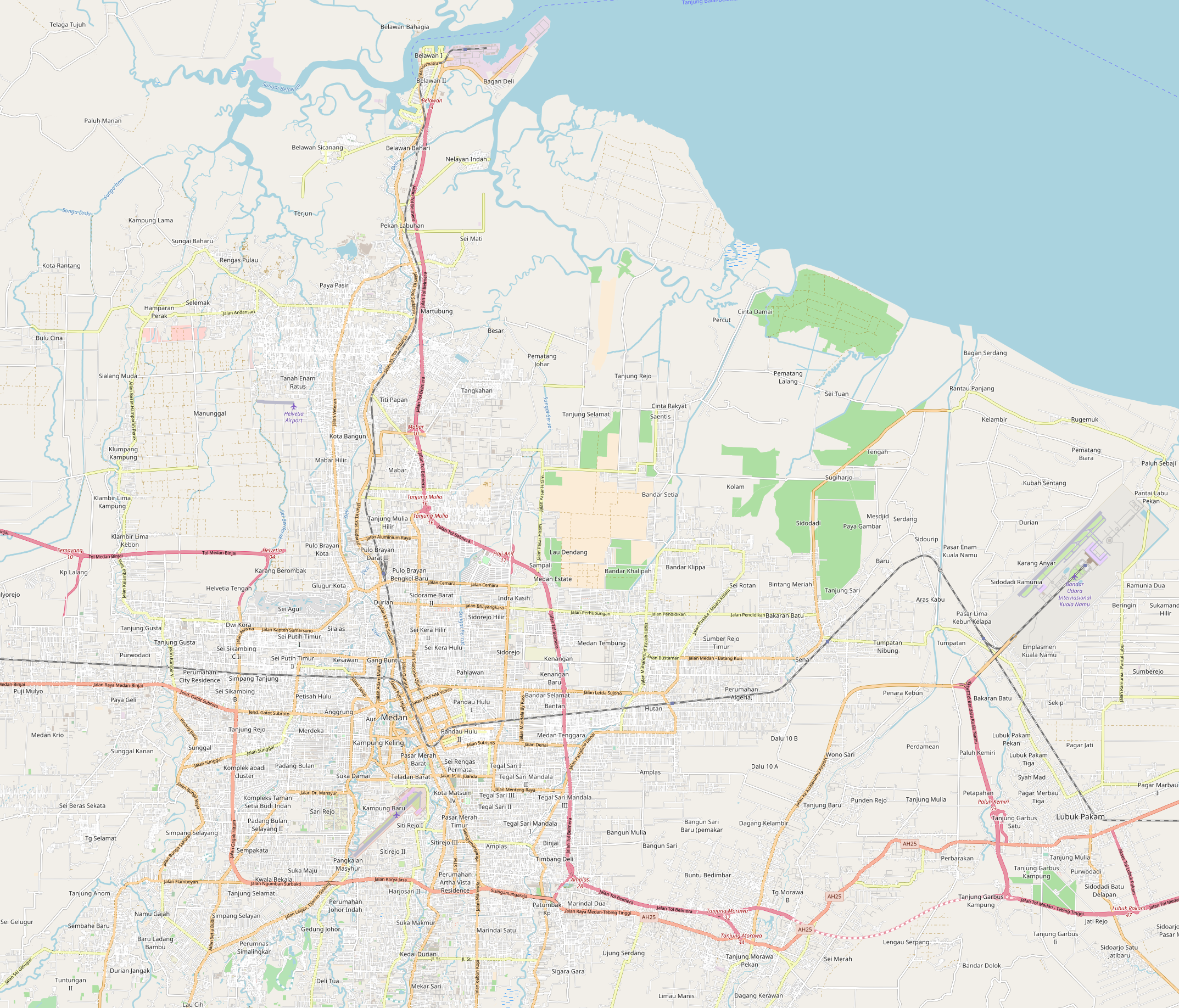
- Location in Medan, Northern Sumatra, Sumatra, and Indonesia Gang Bengkok Old Mosque (Northern Sumatra) Gang Bengkok Old Mosque (Sumatra) Gang Bengkok Old Mosque (Indonesia)

Religion
- Affiliation: Islam
- Branch/tradition: Sunni

Location
- Location: Medan, North Sumatra, Indonesia
- Interactive map of Gang Bengkok Old Mosque
- Coordinates: 3.5866474°N 98.6779922°E

Architecture
- Style: Chinese, Malay
- Groundbreaking: 1874

Gang Bengkok Old Mosque, (Indonesian: Masjid Lama Gang Bengkok; Chinese: 明光老巷清真寺) is a mosque located in Medan, North Sumatra, Indonesia. The Gang Bengkok Old Mosque is precisely located on Jalan Mesjid, Kesawan, West Medan Districy, Medan. Gang Bengkok Old Mosque was built by a merchant and Kapitan from Guangdong, China, named Tjong A Fie. This mosque was first built in 1885, but the renovation was completed in 1889. This mosque was then handed over by Tjong A Fie to the Deli Sultanate, namely during the reign of Sultan Deli Sultan Ma'mun Al Rashid.

== History ==
The Old Gang Bengkok Mosque is estimated to have been built in 1874. The mosque building stands on waqf land from Haji Muhammad Ali, or better known as Datuk Kesawan. During the construction process, Tjong A Fie, a Chinese merchant who moved from China to the city of Medan in the early 19th century, he took care of the entire construction of the mosque by himself.

Previously, the Al-Osmani Mosque was the oldest mosque in the city of Medan, founded in 1854. Then 20 years later, the Gang Bengkok mosque was built which also has a history between the Malays and the Chinese.

Precisely the Old Gang Bengkok mosque was founded in 1874. It has a strange name because at the beginning of its construction it was in a narrow alley. Then there is a bend or bend right in front of the mosque. Coupled with the never having an official name on the mosque, the mosque was named the Old Gang Bengkok mosque. The founder of the Gang Bengkok mosque is the Sultan of Deli who also did not give an official name to the mosque so that the surrounding community around Kesawan named it the Gang Bengkok Old Mosque.

== Architecture ==
Gang Bengkok Old Mosque has a thick touch of Chinese and Malay culture. The combination of these touches produces a unique mosque building. Judging from the architecture, this mosque is not like a mosque building in general, but like a Chinese temple. However, when you enter the mosque, it will be clearly visible and the atmosphere of the mosque is very thick. Buildings such as the temple are not surprising because the construction itself was initiated by a Medan figure of Chinese ethnicity, Tjong A Fie. However, the Gang Bengkok Old Mosque still has a Malay and Islamic touch.

A touch of Malay style can be found on the ceiling of the mosque which has decorations also called Lebah Bergantung (English: Hanging Bees). The decoration is made of wood, resulting in a unique and enchanting carving that produces a kind of yellow curtain. The yellow color itself is a typical color of Malay. Then the gate of the Old Gang Bengkok mosque gets a touch of Persian Islamic style.
