= Nguyễn Khoan =

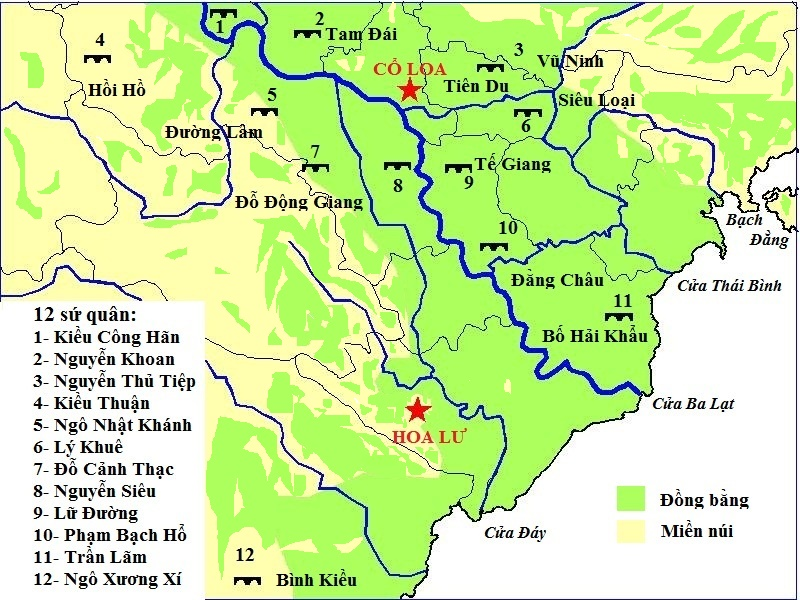
12 Warlords

Nguyễn Khoan (chữ Hán: 阮寬, 906–967) was a warlord of Vietnam during the Period of the 12 Warlords.

Khoan was a grandson of Nguyễn Hãng, a general from China. Khoan had two younger brothers, Nguyễn Thủ Tiệp and Nguyễn Siêu. Both were warlords.

Khoan occupied Tam Đái (modern Yên Lạc District, Vĩnh Phúc Province), and titled himself Nguyễn Thái Bình (阮太平). Later, he was defeated by Đinh Bộ Lĩnh.
