= Tee Hock Seng =

Malaysian businessman and bureaucrat

Yang Berbahagia Tan Sri Datuk Tee Hock Seng PSM PGDK ASDK JP
- 郑福成
- Born: 19 July 1949 (age 77)
- Citizenship: Malaysian
- Occupations: Managing director of Bina Puri Holdings, Bhd

Tee Hock Seng

Chinese name
- Traditional Chinese: 鄭福成
- Simplified Chinese: 郑福成
- Hanyu Pinyin: Zhèng Fúchéng
- Jyutping: Zeng6 Fuk1 Sing4
- Hokkien POJ: Tēⁿ Hok-sêng

Tan Sri Datuk Tee Hock Seng, JP (simplified Chinese: 郑福成; traditional Chinese: 鄭福成; born 19 July 1949) is a Malaysian businessman and group managing director of the construction firm, Bina Puri. He is a former-appointed member of the senate of the Malaysian parliament and the past president of the Chinese Association Federation of Hokkien Association of Malaysia

== Career ==
Tee started his career as a salesman at Chop Seng Lee selling Mobil Petroleum products. He left the firm in 1976 to join his brothers, Tay Hock Lee and Tee Hock Hin, in starting a construction-based company, ‘Pembinaan Tekun Jaya Sdn Bhd’. In 1983 he oversaw the merger of the company with Bina Puri Sdn Bhd. At Bina Puri, Tee began his career as a finance director and was appointed to the board on 5 November 1990. He was subsequently appointed as the group managing director. In January 1995, he was responsible for getting Bina Puri listed on the main board of the Kuala Lumpur Stock Exchange (KLSE).

The firm has completed numerous multi-million ringgit projects (valued in excess of US$2 billion), in Malaysia and overseas The group's business activities include investment holdings, property development and management, the manufacturing of construction materials, power generation, highway concessionaire, and hospitality.

== Party affiliations ==
On 15 July 2008, Tee was an appointed a member of the Malaysian Senate (the Dewan Negara), for a term of three years. He served concurrently as treasurer-general of the Malaysian Chinese Association (MCA) from 2008 to 2010. Following the defeat of the MCA aligned president, Tan Sri Dato Seri Ong Tee Keat, in the party polls, Tee tendered his resignation on 30 March 2010.

== Honours ==
- Malaysia's Construction Industry Development Board (CIDB) in 2005 the "Most Prominent Player" award.
- Lifetime achievement award at the 2nd Malaysia Golden Entrepreneur Awards.
- Atsumi Award at the 44th International Federation of Asian and Western Pacific Contractors’ Associations (IFAWPCA) in 2018.

=== Honours of Malaysia ===
- Malaysia
  - Commander of the Order of Loyalty to the Crown of Malaysia (PSM) – Tan Sri (2000)
- Sabah
  - Companion of the Order of Kinabalu (ASDK) (1989)
  - Commander of the Order of Kinabalu (PGDK) – Datuk (1991)
- Selangor
  - Justice of the Peace of Selangor (JP) (1991)
