= Tjong Yong Hian =

Hakka Chinese businessman and kapitan

Majoor Tjong Yong Hian 張爵幹
- Tjong Yong Hian
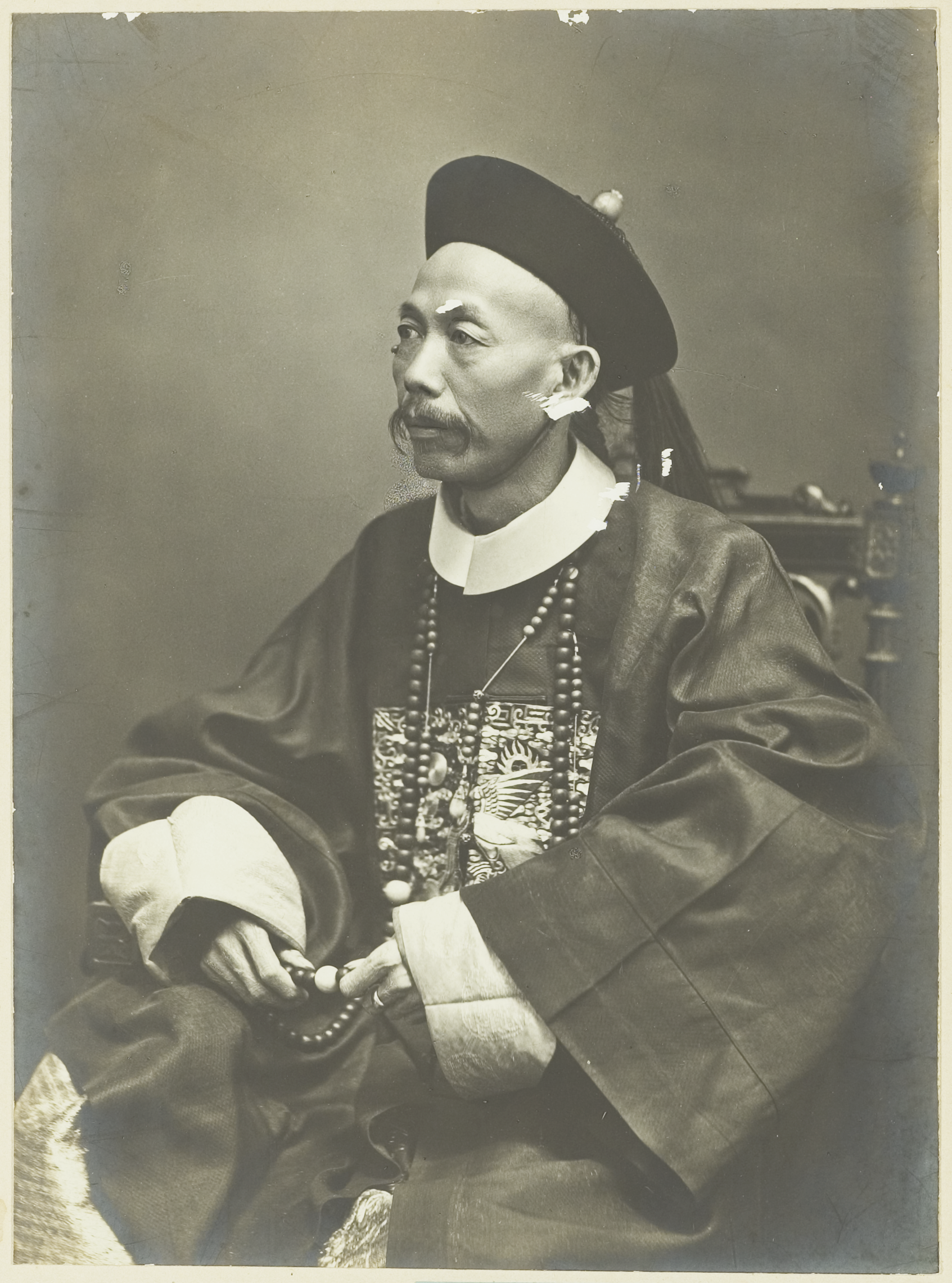
- Tjong Yong Hian, majoor der Chinezen te Medan

Majoor der Chinezen of Medan
- In office 1890–1911
- Succeeded by: Tjong A Fie

Personal details
- Born: Zhang Yu Nan / Zhang Rongxuan; 1850 Meixian District, Canton Province, China
- Died: 1911 (aged 60–61) Medan, Dutch East Indies
- Spouse: Nee Xu

Tjong Yong Hian
- Traditional Chinese: 張爵幹
- Simplified Chinese: 张爵干
- Hanyu Pinyin: Zhāng Juégàn
Transcriptions
Standard Mandarin
- Hanyu Pinyin: Zhāng Juégàn

Tjong Yong Hian (1850–1911) was a Hakka Chinese businessman and kapitan who greatly contributed to the development of society in the city of Medan around the early 1900s. He is the brother of Tjong A Fie, his kapitan successor.

Tjong Yong Hian, also known as Zhang Yu Nan or Zhang Rongxuan, was the second of 7 children. Descending from a Hakka family, he was born in Guangdong, Songkou city, Meixian District, South China, in 1850. He migrated from China to Indonesia, departing through the port of Shantou and sailed across the South China Sea. After sailing for 21 days, he landed in Jakarta (formerly Batavia), in 1867 at the age of 17. Three years later, having had sufficient savings, Tjong left Batavia for Medan, Sumatra, with the intention of starting his own business. Tjong was fluent in Malay, a respectable language in North Sumatra.

== Early life ==
Tjong was born under the name Tjong Yu Nam (spelled in Hakka Chinese, traditional Chinese: 張爵幹; simplified Chinese: 张爵干; pinyin: Zhāng Juégàn) from the Hakka lineage in Guangdong (formerly known as Canton) in 1850. He was the second of six brothers and one sister, also known as Zhang Rongxuan and Zhang Yu Nan, and finally known as Tjong Yong Hian (spelled in Hakka Chinese).

In 1867, he migrated from China to Indonesia, departing through the port of Shantou sailing across the South China Sea. After 21 days, he landed in Batavia (present-day Jakarta), at the age of 17.

== Prominence in Medan ==
Installation of Tjong Yong Hian as captain and Tjong A Fie as Lieutenant of the Chinese at Medan

In 1870, Tjong established a trading company called N.V. Wan Yun Chong. His business grew rapidly, investing in real estate and shipping, as well as agricultural plantations such as sugarcane, tobacco, rubber. He worked closely with his former employer in Batavia, Cheong Fatt Tze, to start a plantation company in Yogyakarta growing rubber, coconut, coffee, and tea. They acquired hundreds of square kilometers of land, including 8 rubber plantations and a tea processing factory, providing employment for thousands of people. Later, they collaboratively opened a Jogja Bank. With the help of his younger brother, Tjong A Fie, Tjong again invested in real estate in Medan, which is known as the Kesawan area. In 1907, the Tjong brothers founded the Bank Deli, in attempt to eliminate the monopoly of the Dutch East Indies Bank which had a complicated procedure for sending money to China by Chinese foreigners in Sumatra. His business spread to various parts of the world, with the largest capital in Southeast Asia at the time. The Tjong brothers again collaborated with Tjong Fatt Tze to establish two shipping companies in Batavia and Medan called Yi Chong and Fuk Guang.

Tjong was appointed by the Dutch as major and his younger brother Tjong A Fie was appointed as lieutenant. Tjong was highly respected by the Chinese community and Dutch government.

In 1904, Tjong received the highest award from the Netherlands for his dedication to the sacrifice of energy, thought, and time, for the success of a noble cause: dedication to carrying out noble ideals for humanity.

He contributed in the construction of the Great Mosque of Medan, the Hospital in Belawan, the Tian Hou Temple, and the Old Mosque in Gang Bengkok. Tjong exemplified how harmony between religious communities in ancient times could be shown by building houses of worship for every people, even if they differ in religion, race, and ethnicity.*

Tjong owned two banks. The first is Jogja Bank, a joint venture with his former employer, Tjong Bi Shi, and the second is the Bank Deli, jointly owned with his younger brother, Tjong A Fie, and other business partners.

The Medan City Government demonstrated its appreciation to the Tjong family — specifically Tjong Yong Hian for his participation and contribution in the construction and improvement of the city — by changing the name of Jalan Bogor back to Jalan Tjong Yong Hian, as well as erecting Tjong Yong Hian Park. The inauguration of the park was witnessed directly by Tjong's great-grandson and heir, Budihardjo Chandra (Tjong Foeng Kioen). Tjong Yong Hian Park, located in the heart of Medan, is the final resting place of Tjong and his wife. At the entrance gate is written Plush Flower Garden (Mao Rong Yuan), and after entering a few meters inside, above the green gated entrance, the park's name is written, Tjong Yong Hian Park.

== Later life ==
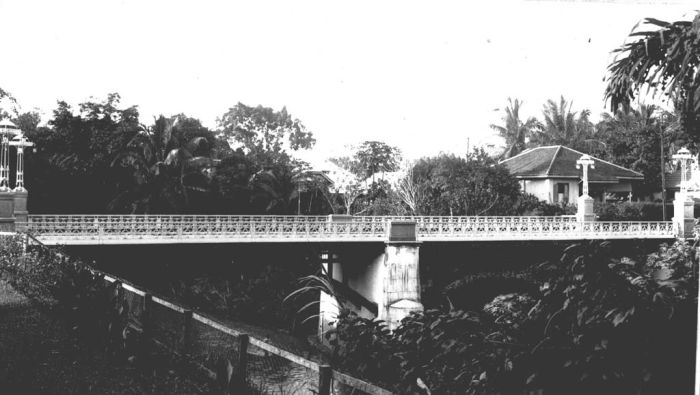
Tjong Yong Hian bridge, located in Medan, later named as Kebajikan (benelovent) bridge

Tjong's contribution to Medan, Penang, and China received attention and appreciation with a title from the Qing Government for his social contribution in China. He also had the honor of being recognized twice in Beijing by Empress Ci Xi and Emperor Guang Xu. In 1904, Tjong's contribution to Medan was recognized by naming a busy street after him: Jalan Tjong Yong Hian. The street was later renamed to Jalan Bogor, and in 2013, in conjunction with the 2013 Heroes' Day, was re-paved to become Jalan Tjong Yong Hian by the Acting Mayor of Medan, Dzulmi Eldin.

Tjong Yong Hian has many houses in Medan as well as several houses in his hometown. The address in China is Guangdong City, Meizhou province, Meizhou state, South Songnan village. He and his wife (Nee Xu) had three sons, Pu Ching, Cen Ching and Min Ching, and four daughters. The Tjong family's house in Medan was located on Jalan Kesawan (now Jalan A. Yani). While in China, Tjong and his ancestors had a home in Meixian, China. Tjong died at the age of 61 years (11 September 1911), drawing thousands of mourners from all ethnicities and nationalities. Tjong and Nee Xu's final resting place is at Tjong Yong Hian Park, in a fiery red tomb overlooking a lotus pond. Tjong Yong Hian Park has since undergone renovations and is maintained by his great-grandson, Budihardjo Chandra (Tjong Foeng Kioen), the fourth generation, and his family.

After his death in 1911, his eldest son, Chang Pu Ching, and his brother continued Tjong's social activities by building the Tjong Yong Hian bridge across the Babura River (Jalan KH. Zainul Arifin). Today, the bridge is named the Benevolent Bridge and has been used as one of the historical and cultural heritages of the city of Medan and was awarded the 2003 Unesco Award Of Merit.

== Family and personal life ==
The Tjong Family, circa 1900

Tjong's children, Chang Pu Ching/Tjong Hauw Loeng, Chan Cen Ching/Tjong Hian Loeng and Chang Min Ching/Tjong Seng Loeng, were still in Indonesia during the Dutch colonial period. After Tjong's death, the Ministry of Commerce of the Qing Kingdom appointed Chang Pu Ching as inspector to oversee the railway construction project between the cities of Chao Chow and Chow Shan Tou as Tjong A Fie's children were still in school in 1904.

Because of Indonesia's unstable political environment post-independence, the descendants of the third generation scattered abroad to China, Malaysia, and Europe, among other areas and, therefore, neglected the family company, leading to a lack of structured leadership.

In 1972, Budiharjo from the fourth generation, opened the Indonesian Packaging Industry (IPI) factory in a joint venture with his sister, who currently resides in Singapore, and another friend, William Tiopan. IPI's business was developed again. Budiharjo opened a paper factory to supply paper raw materials to IPI, namely PT. Evergreen International Paper. Budiharjo's business was expanded by his son into the palm oil sector, housing construction, as well as warehousing development.

Government offices
Preceded by -	Majoor der Chinezen of Medan; 1911–1921	Succeeded by Kapitein Tjong A Fie
