= Ing Yoe Tan =

Dutch lawmaker (1948–2020)

- Born: 18 April 1948; The Hague, Netherlands
- Died: 10 April 2020 (aged 71); Amsterdam, Netherlands
- Political party: Labour Party (PvdA)

Chinese name
- Traditional Chinese: 陳英茹
- Simplified Chinese: 陈英茹
Transcriptions
Standard Mandarin
- Hanyu Pinyin: Chén Yīng Rú
- Bopomofo: ㄔㄣˊ ㄧㄥ ㄖㄨˊ
- Gwoyeu Romatzyh: Chern Ing Ru
Southern Min
- Hokkien POJ: Tân Eng Jú

Ing Yoe Tan (Chinese: 陳英茹; 18 April 1948 – 10 April 2020) was a Dutch lawmaker. She was a member of the Senate for the Labour Party (PvdA) between 8 June 1999 and 7 June 2011.

Tan was born in The Hague. She came from a Chinese Indonesian family during the Dutch East Indies era; Dutch was the language most spoken by the family.

She died in Amsterdam, aged 71, due to COVID-19.

== See also ==
- European politicians of Chinese descent
