= Tjong A Fie =

Hakka Chinese businessman, banker and kapitan

Majoor Tjong A Fie 張耀軒
- Tjong Yiauw Hian
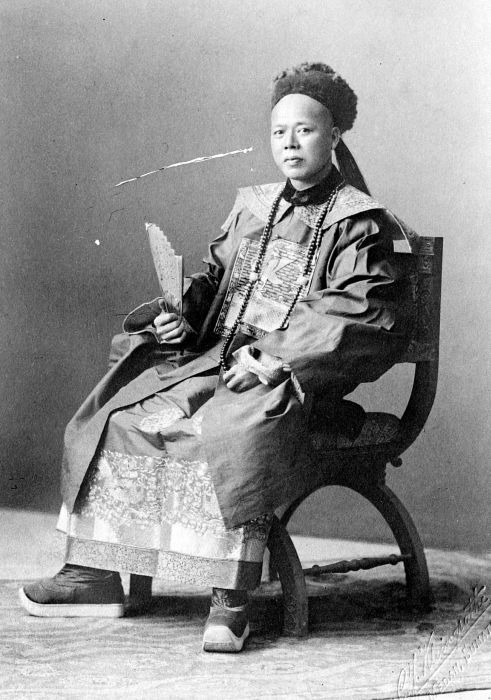
- Tjong A Fie, photographed by Charles J. Kleingrothe

Majoor der Chinezen of Medan
- In office 1911–1921
- Preceded by: Kapitein Tjong Yong Hian
- Succeeded by: Kapitein Oen Gan The

Personal details
- Born: Tjong Fung Nam; 1860 Meixian District, Canton Province, China
- Died: 4 February 1921 (age 61) Medan, Dutch East Indies
- Cause of death: Brain apoplexy

Tjong A Fie
- Traditional Chinese: 張耀軒
- Simplified Chinese: 张耀轩
Transcriptions
Standard Mandarin
- Hanyu Pinyin: Zhāng Yàoxuān
- Bopomofo: ㄓㄤ ㄧㄠˋ ㄒㄩㄢ
- Gwoyeu Romatzyh: Jang Yawshiuan
Hakka
- Pha̍k-fa-sṳ: Chông Yeu Hian

Tjong A Fie, Majoor der Chinezen (1860–1921), or Tjong Yiauw Hian (spelled in Hakka Chinese dialect, traditional Chinese: 張耀軒; simplified Chinese: 张耀轩; pinyin: Zhāng Yàoxuān; Hakka Pha̍k-fa-sṳ: Chông Yeu Hian), birth name Zhang Hongnan (simplified Chinese: 张鸿南; traditional Chinese: 張鴻南; pinyin: Zhāng Hóngnán), was a Hakka Chinese businessman, banker and kapitan (Chinese major) who built a large plantation business in Sumatra, Indonesia. Tjong A Fie built his business that employed more than 10,000 labor workers. Because of his great success, he maintained a good relationship with the ruler of Deli, including the ninth Sultan of Deli, Sultan Ma'mun Al Rashid Perkasa Alamyah and Dutch authorities.

In 1911, Tjong A Fie was appointed as a Kapitan Cina (Majoor der Chineezen) or major of the Chinese community in Medan, replacing his deceased brother Tjong Yong Hian. As a leader of the community, he was well thought of and respected by people, because he was linked with economy and political systems of the city. His enterprises were invested in his palm oil and sugar cane plantations, as well as banks and railroads.

== Early life ==
Tjong was born under the name Tjong Fung Nam (spelled in Hakka Chinese, traditional Chinese: 張鴻南; simplified Chinese: 张鸿南; pinyin: Zhāng Hóngnán) from the Hakka lineage in Guangdong (formerly known as Canton) at year 1860. He was also known as Tjong Yiauw Hian, and later in his life finally known as Tjong A Fie (spelled in Hakka Chinese, traditional Chinese: 張阿輝; simplified Chinese: 张阿辉; pinyin: Zhāng Āhūi) .

He came from a poor family. With his brother, Tjong Yong Hian, Tjong left school and helped in running his father's shop. Although he only had a brief education, Tjong knew the ways of trading and made his family's business successful.

Tjong decided to travel to the Dutch East Indies (now Indonesia) to seek a better life. At 1875, Tjong A Fie came to Medan and decided to settle down. He was only 18 years old at that time. With little money, he decided to follow his brother, Tjong Yong Hian, who stayed in Medan for five years. At that time, his brother was already a notable leader in Medan.

== Prominence in Medan ==
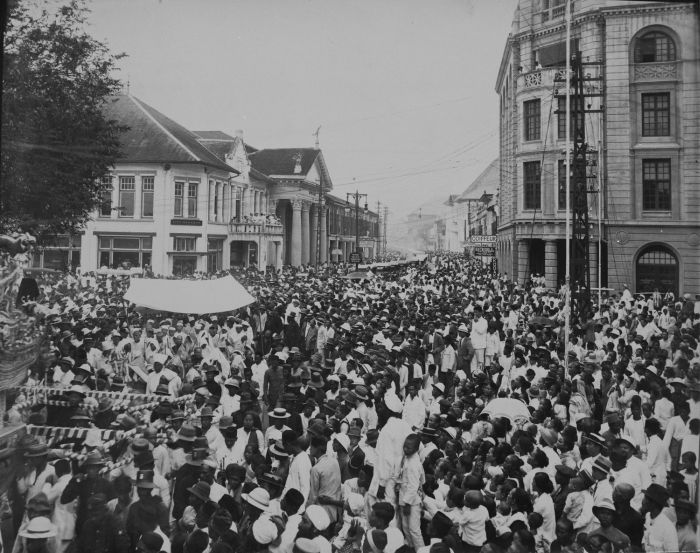
The crowd around Kesawan street during funeral procession of the deceased Major Tjong A Fie on 4 February 1921

Tjong was a prominent figure in the development of Medan, as seen through the construction of various buildings utilized by the citizens of Medan past and present. These buildings include Tjong A Fie's Mansion, located in Ahmad Yani Street near the Kesawan area, the Old Mosque or sometimes known as Gang Bengkok Old Mosque, and the clock tower of Medan City Hall, which is located in the intersection between Radan Saleh Street and Kesawan.

At year 1911, Tjong was appointed as Kapitan Cina (Majoor der Chineezen) to lead the Tionghoa community in Medan, replacing his brother, Tjong Yong Hian. Tjong was a highly respected person; he was also a master of the economics and politics of Medan. His business kingdom covered banks, railroads, plantations, which included palm oil plants and sugar plants.

While he carried out his duties as a Kapitan, Tjong succeeded in developing his individual business and the city of Medan. One of those developments included building the Kesawan Bank as a forerunner for financial security in Medan. The construction of educational facilities, hospitals, houses of worship and other public facilities has made Tjong as an incredibly influential figure in Medan. These developmental projects were supported by the close relationship of Tjong with the Sultanate of Deli, the ruler of the Land Deli (also known as Medan) at the time.

== Family and personal life ==
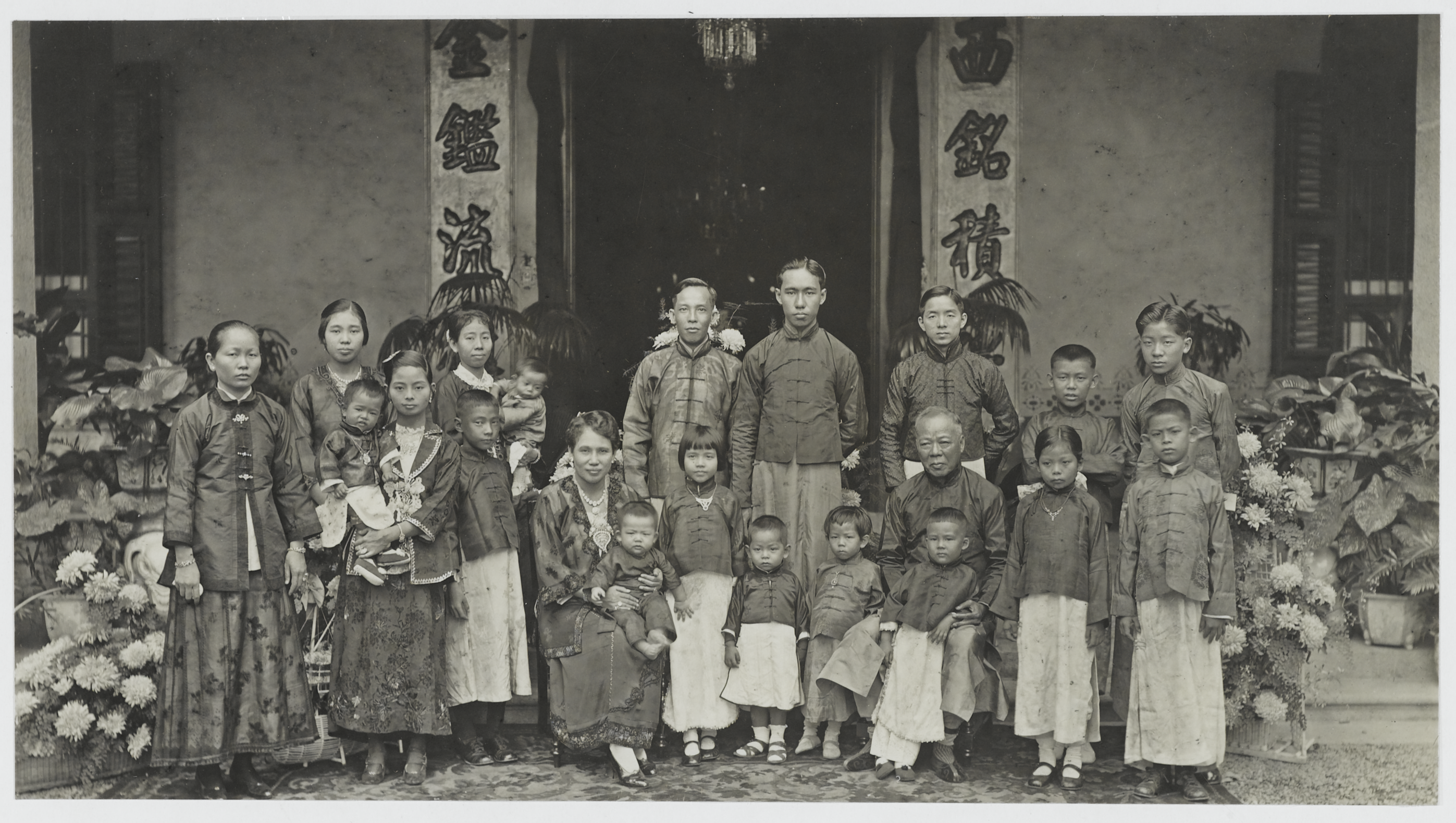
Tjong family, 1920s

Back in China, Tjong married a woman with the family name of Lee. Upon arriving in Medan, he married a lady named Chew from Penang and had three children, named Tjong Kong Liong, Tjong Jin Song and Tjong Kwei Jin. Madame Chew died a few years later for unknown reasons. There is no historical record of these three children after the death of Madame Chew. Tjong married again several years later to Lim Koei-Yap from Binjai. He had seven children from this marriage.

Several of Tjong's grandchildren and great-grandchildren had grown up together in Medan. After Tjong's demise and subsequent social instability in Indonesia, some of them moved overseas to countries including Malaysia, Singapore, Netherlands, USA, UK, Scotland and Belgium while a few stayed in Medan, Bali and Jakarta. They remain in close contact till today despite the distance.

== Tjong A Fie Mansion ==
Tjong's long-time residence is located at Kesawan Street, Medan. The mansion is an architectural mix of Malay, European, and Tionghoa styles and contains forty rooms, each lined with hand-painted floor tiles from Italy and the walls depicting life in China with great detail.

The Tjong A Fie Mansion consists of two floors with each floor having its own designation. The first floor consists of several important rooms, including the right side of the house reserved for ethnically Chinese guests only, while the left side of the house has a room reserved for the Sultan of Deli and his family or guests. The middle room on the ground floor is a reception room for guests—the room has a door ten meters tall and has a Chinese-style wooden door handle. On the back of the ground floor, there are spaces for ancestral worship, private rooms, and Tjong's family room. The top floor of the building is used as a ball room or meeting room; there is also an altar facing the meeting room used as a means of worship by Tjong and his family.

The mansion has two doors, the entrance of which is facing the Ahmad Yani Street in Kesawan and the exit of which is facing the Red Cross Street. The mansion spatially segregated men and women where the right part of building was intended for men and the left for women. This division was not limited to Tjong and his family, but also to guests and workers who settled in the mansion.

Construction of the mansion was completed circa 1900. In 2000, it was included in the list of cultural heritage landmarks protected by legislation in the city of Medan. The mansion has been open to public since 18 June 2009 to commemorate Tjong A Fie's 150th birthday and has been a popular tourist spot.

Government offices
| Preceded by Kapitein Tjong Yong Hian | Majoor der Chinezen of Medan; 1911–1921 | Succeeded by Kapitein Oen Gan The |
