= Varina Tjon-A-Ten =

Dutch politician

Varina Tjon-A-Ten PhD

Member of House of Representatives
- In office 2003–2006

Personal details
- Born: November 29, 1952 (age 73) Paramaribo, Colony of Surinam
- Party: Labour Party

Varina Tjon-A-Ten (born 29 November 1952 in Paramaribo) is a Dutch former politician who was a member of the House of Representatives for the Labour Party (PvdA) from 2003 to 2006. She is currently a professor at The Hague University.

Her paternal grandfather came from mainland China to Suriname, but she refers herself to as moksi watra (mixed blood): one of her great-grandmothers was a Brahmin Indian from British Guiana who married a Scot, and she also has Dutch and Jewish ancestry. Her family arrived in Rotterdam in 1964.

== See also ==
- European politicians of Chinese descent
