= Nguyễn Siêu =

Vietnamese warlord in the Middle Ages

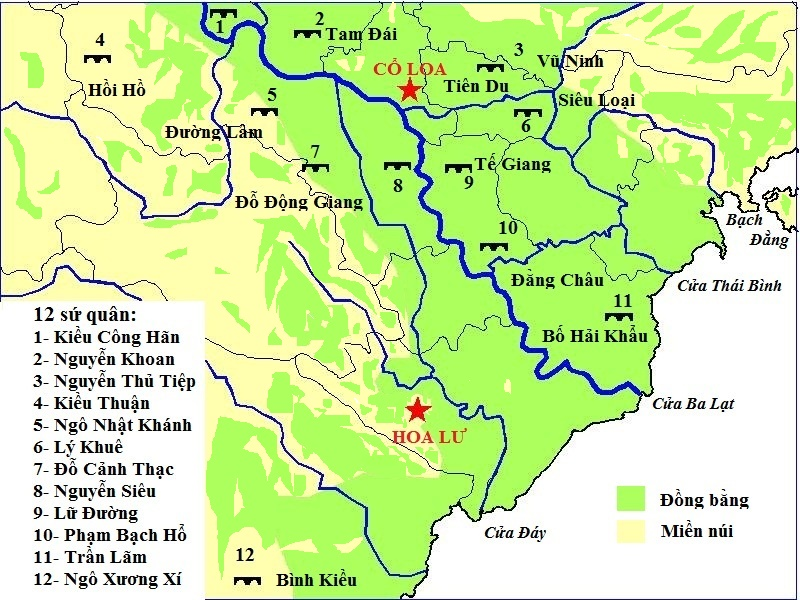
12 Warlords

Nguyễn Siêu (chữ Hán: 阮超, 924–967) was a warlord of Vietnam during the Period of the 12 Warlords.

Siêu was a grandson of Nguyễn Hãng, a general from China. Siêu had two elder brothers, Nguyễn Khoan and Nguyễn Thủ Tiệp. Both were warlords.

Siêu occupied Tây Phù Liệt (modern Thanh Trì District, Hanoi), and titled himself Nguyễn Hữu Công (阮右公). Later, he was defeated by Đinh Bộ Lĩnh.
