= Yap Kwan Seng =

Malaysian politician

Kapitan China Yap Kwan Seng
- 葉觀盛
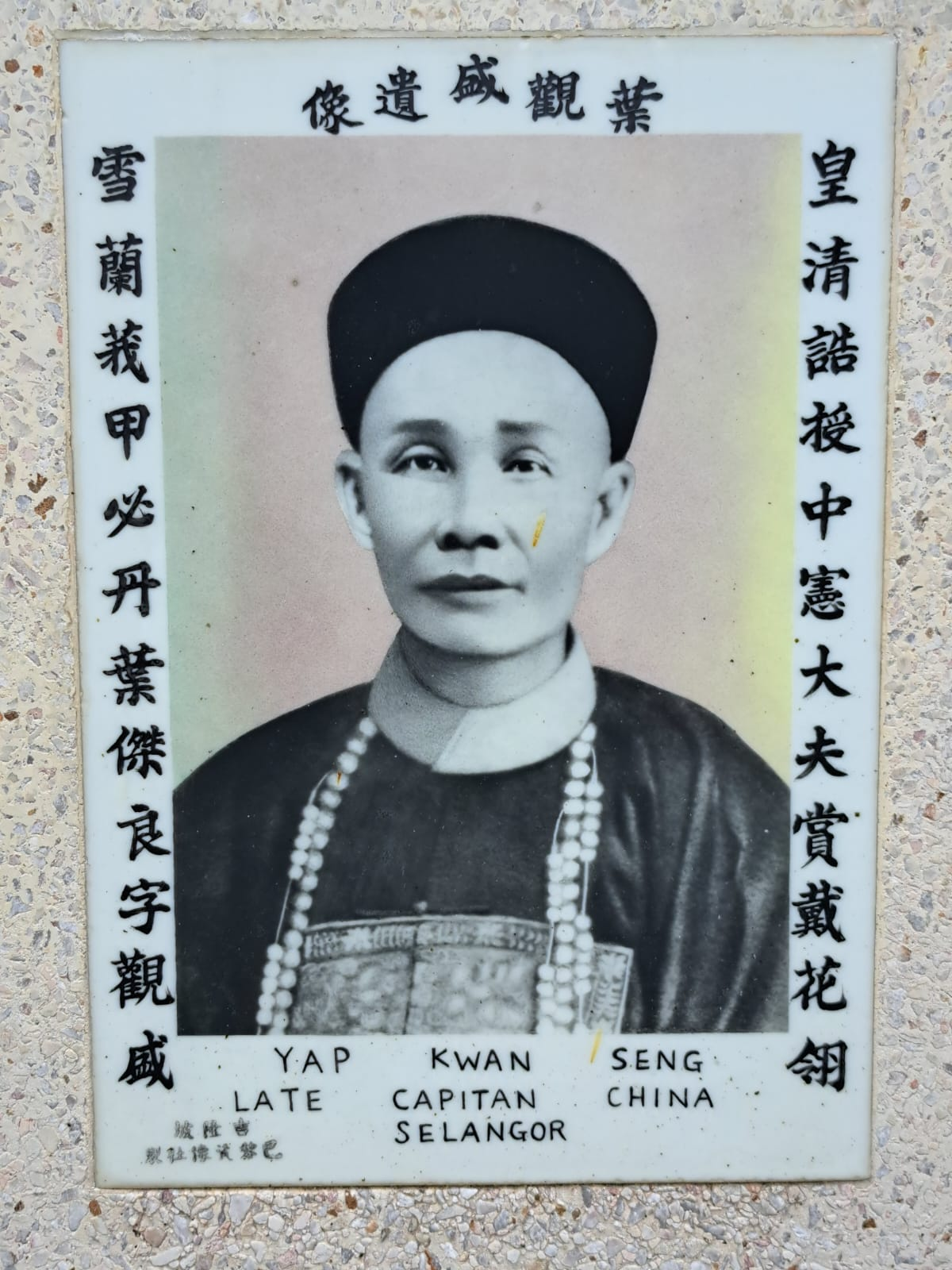
- Portrait of Yap Kwan Seng

Kapitan China of Kuala Lumpur
- In office 1889–1902
- Preceded by: Yap Ah Shak
- Succeeded by: Post abolished

Personal details
- Born: 1846 Taishan, Guangdong, (Qing dynasty) Qing empire
- Died: 17 January 1902 (aged 55–56) Kuala Lumpur, Federated Malay States
- Occupation: Kapitan
- Awards: Grand Master Exemplar (中憲大夫)

Kapitan China Yap Kwan Seng (Chinese: 葉觀盛; Pha̍k-fa-sṳ: Ya̍p Kôn-sṳ̀n; 1846 – 1902) was the fifth and last Kapitan China of Kuala Lumpur from 1889 to 1902. Kapitans were appointed chiefs or headmen of the various ethnic communities during the period of British colonial rule in what is present-day Malaysia. Kapitans played an important role in the history of the Chinese in Malaysia. They wielded considerable influence, contributing to social, economic and political development in areas under their jurisdiction.

Yap Kwan Seng, of Hakka descent, was born in 1846 in the Chak Kai district of China. He was a Hakka of the Fui Chiu clan. He moved to Malaya at the age of 18 and worked as a tin miner in Seremban.

== Entrepreneurship ==
In 1870, Yap packed his bags for Selangor, where he began his hard work to help pioneer the tin mining industry. He made his fortune in tin mining. It is said he had a workforce of 7,000 and soon owned more tin mines than any of his contemporaries.

As a businessman, he foresaw an increased demand for bricks in fast-growing Kuala Lumpur and established a kiln in a district that came to be called Brickfields, a name by which it is still known today.

Yap was elected the fifth Kapitan in 1890 and was also appointed a member of the State Legislative Assembly of Selangor.

He ran his own small police force that helped him manage his many business interests. Yap was also the first Chinese to serve on the Kuala Lumpur Sanitary Board.

During the Pahang War in 1892 and the Boer War, Yap assisted the British by providing transportation, supplies and funds.

Yap also helped introduce the Chinese system of mining in West Africa when he sent thirty of his miners to assist the governor Sir William Maxwell in establishing the mining industry.

== Social Contributions ==
Kapitan Yap Kwan Seng is noted for his philanthropic deeds and contributions to the birth of Kuala Lumpur.

=== Education ===
Kapitan Yap was a firm believer in education and co-founded one of the oldest schools in Kuala Lumpur, the Victoria Institution.

=== Healthcare ===
Yap founded and funded the Pooi Shin Thong medical center to provide free healthcare services to the poor. The center grew and was later renamed Tung Shin Hospital, located along Jalan Pudu.

Yap also co-founded the Tai Wah Ward of the Pauper’s Hospital that became the Kuala Lumpur General Hospital as well as Chak Kai Koong Kon in Jalan Sultan.

=== Philanthropy ===
His philanthropic deeds extended beyond Malaya and it is said that a year before he died in 1901, he donated the large sum of ten thousand dollars towards famine relief in India.

== Houses ==
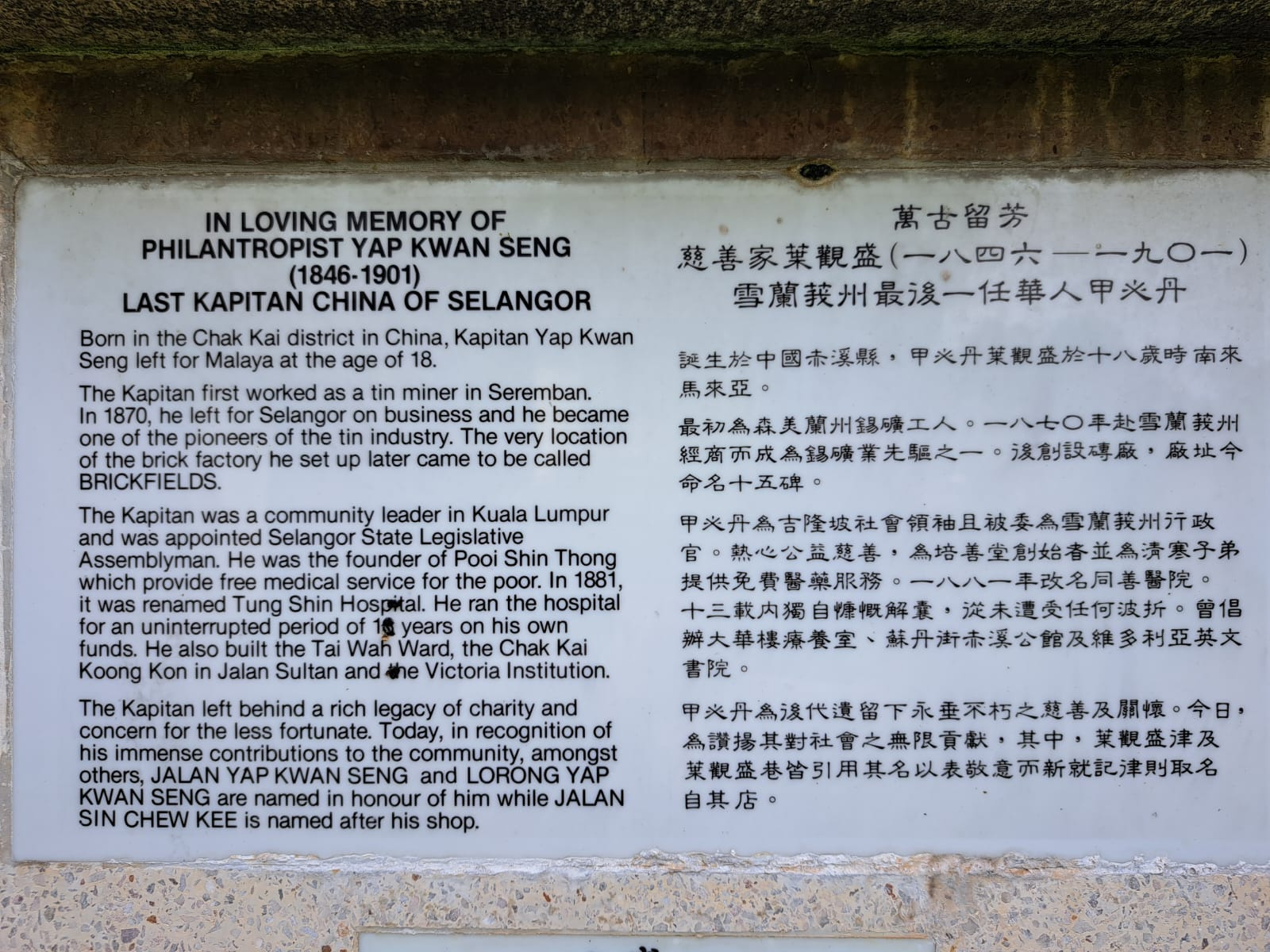
Memorial of Yap Kwan Seng in Kuala Lumpur

Yap Kwan Seng owned houses in Kuala Lumpur and Macau.

=== Kuala Lumpur ===
The Kapitan’s residence in Kuala Lumpur was located on High Street in Kuala Lumpur’s Chinatown, which is today known as Jalan Tun H.S. Lee.

It was massive, occupying the greater part of the street, with many deep courtyards, and a large garden in front for entertaining guests. Over 50 people, many of whom were servants, lived in the house. The ancestral hall was particularly impressive as it had a grand altar table upon which were placed chunks of crystal, quartz, gold and other precious stones found in the Kapitan’s tin mines.

=== Macau ===
The kapitan's mansion in Macau was apparently even bigger than the Kuala Lumpur residence. It was long and deep, with countless rooms, nooks and crannies, and so large that many sections were perpetually dim as they had no access to natural light.

== Death and legacy ==
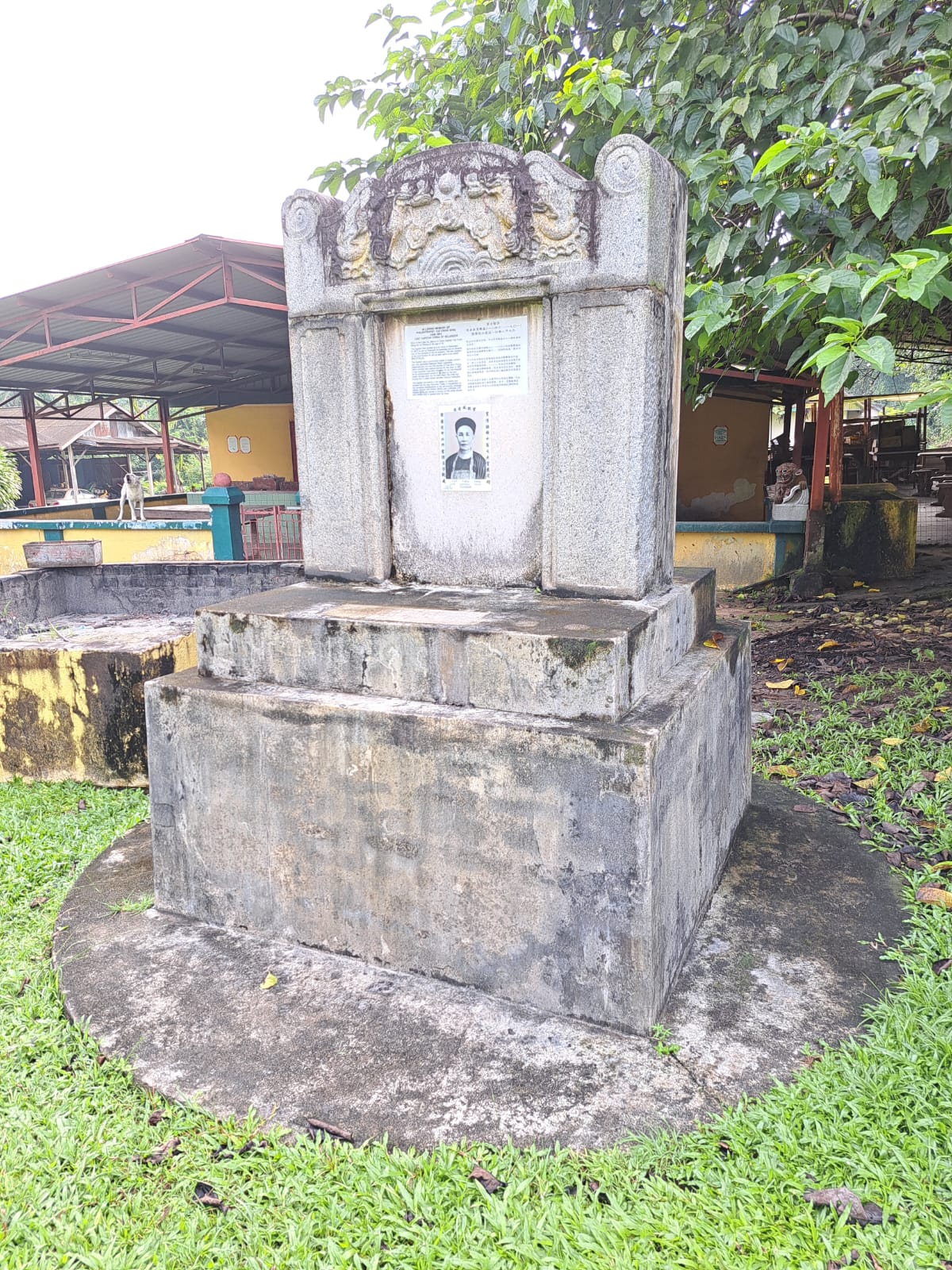
Whole Memorial to Yap Kwan Seng in Kuala Lumpur

Yap died in 1902 and was remembered as a highly respected community leader who was greatly concerned with the welfare of the people in the then Malaya through his charity initiatives. After his death in 1902, the position of Kapitan China was abolished. A memorial was erected in his honor in Kuala Lumpur and can be visited today.

On his death, The Straits Budget published the following obituary:

TOWKAY Yap Kwan Seng, the Captain China of Selangor, died at Kuala Lumpur on Friday, of consumption, at the age of fifty-five years, of which he had spent forty in the Straits. He came from the Canton province and had resided for thirty-two years in Selangor. He had held the post of Captain China there since 1889. The deceased was popular among all classes and was a liberal giver to charities. He was a Trustee of the Victoria Institution to whose funds he liberally subscribed. He gave $10,000 to the Transvaal War Fund and also a handsome donation to St. Mary's Church building fund. He was always a good friend to his poorer countrymen, for whom he established a practically free dispensary. During the Pahang rebellion, he rendered much assistance to the Government and was thanked for his services. He leaves behind him five wives here and three in China, also a large family consisting of fifteen sons and ten daughters.

A major road in central Kuala Lumpur called Jalan Yap Kwan Seng near the world-famous KLCC is named in his honour. Jalan Sin Chew Kee, which is located off Jalan Hang Tuah, was also named in his honour after his tin mining business.

== Notes ==
Government offices
Preceded by Kapitan Yap Ah Shak	Kapitan China of Kuala Lumpur; 1889–1902	Office abolished
