= Roy Ho Ten Soeng =

Dutch politician (born 1945)

Mayor of Venhuizen
- In office 1 January 2000 – 1 January 2006
- Preceded by: Aad Vlaar

Acting Mayor of Medemblik
- In office 1 December 2005 – 1 January 2007
- Preceded by: Enno Neef
- Succeeded by: Wim Kozijn

Personal details
- Born: Kiem Ling Roy Ho Ten Soeng; 16 June 1945 (age 81) Paramaribo, Suriname
- Party: Christian Democratic Appeal
- Occupation: Politician

Chinese name
- Traditional Chinese: 何天送
- Simplified Chinese: 何天送
- Jyutping: Ho4 Tin1 Sung3
Transcriptions
Standard Mandarin
- Hanyu Pinyin: Hé Tiān Sòng
- Bopomofo: ㄏㄜˊ ㄊㄧㄢ ㄙㄨㄥˋ
- Gwoyeu Romatzyh: Her Tian Sonq
Yue: Cantonese
- Jyutping: Ho4 Tin1 Sung3

Kiem Ling Roy Ho Ten Soeng (Chinese: 何天送; born 16 June 1945) is a Dutch politician of the Christian Democratic Appeal (CDA). He served as mayor of Venhuizen from 2000 until 2006. Born in Suriname and of Chinese descent, he was often considered the first immigrant mayor in the Netherlands, although Dzsingisz Gabor was mayor of Haaksbergen in 1983 till 1990. Roy is the first mayor of Chinese descent in the Netherlands and in Europe.

== Biography ==
Ho Ten Soeng was born in Paramaribo, Suriname. He was originally a teacher and has worked in Suriname, Aruba and the Netherlands, first as a teacher and later as a history teacher in secondary schools in Zaanstad and Haarlem.

In 1990, Ho Ten Soeng became an alderman in Alkmaar, and on 1 January 2000 he became mayor of Venhuizen. His constituency became involved in a merger process with the municipality of Drechterland. He is very active in the field of volunteering: he founded the Chinese Consultative Body, is chairman of the Network of Chinese Volunteers, and is requested regularly in churches of the Moravians (EBG) as an active pastor. Currently he is a "VNG Ambassador Safety" for North Holland.

Roy was acting mayor of Medemblik from 1 December 2005 until the merger with Noorder-Koggenland and Wognum on 1 January 2007.

In 2008, Ho Ten Soeng was involved with the scouting of immigrant and female mayor candidates for the Dutch Ministry of the Interior.

In early 2011 he was 12th place on the list of candidates of 50PLUS for the Senate. For the 2012 general election he stood in sixth place on the list of candidates.

== See also ==
- European politicians of Chinese descent
