= Nathaniel Tan =

Malaysian activist and communications specialist

- Born: 1980 (age 45–46); Malaysia
- Other name: Nat
- Education: Harvard College (BA in Peace and Conflict Studies)
- Occupations: Activist, communications specialist
- Years active: 2007–present
- Organization: Parti Keadilan Rakyat (PKR)
- Known for: Detention under the Official Secrets Act in 2007, activism in Malaysian politics
- Notable work: Mahathir vs. Abdullah: Covert Wars and Challenged Legacies; Religion Under Siege?: Lina Joy, the Islamic State and Freedom of Faith; Political Tsunami: An End to Hegemony in Malaysia? Where is Justice?: Death and Brutality in Custody
- Website: jelas.info (archived)

Nathaniel Tan (born 1980) is a Malaysian of Chinese-Indian Peranakan descent. In July 2007, he came under the spotlight when he was detained by the Royal Malaysian Police for allegedly violating the Official Secrets Act. He was then working with current Opposition Leader Anwar Ibrahim. After being detained for a few days, he was released with no charges preferred.

Nat was the editor of a book on the conflict between former Prime Minister of Malaysia Mahathir Mohamad and Abdullah Ahmad Badawi, titled Mahathir vs. Abdullah: Covert Wars and Challenged Legacies and published in early 2007. He later co-edited a book on religion and politics with John Lee, Religion Under Siege?: Lina Joy, the Islamic State and Freedom of Faith, published in early 2008. Nat has since co-edited two books on Malaysian politics with Lee, Political Tsunami: An End to Hegemony in Malaysia? and Where is Justice?: Death and Brutality in Custody. The latter, a book concerning custodial deaths, including high-profile cases such as those of Altantuya Shaariibuu and Teoh Beng Hock, was confiscated from a number of bookstores in late January 2010, a month after its release, prompting concerns that it may have been banned by the Home Ministry.

== Early life ==
Nat originally lived in the Damansara Utama suburb of Petaling Jaya, before moving to Taman Tun Dr Ismail in Kuala Lumpur. He attended Sunway University College where he studied for his A Levels, before attending Harvard College in the United States, where he obtained a bachelor's degree in 2004 with a Special Concentration in Peace and Conflict Studies.

== Political work ==
In February 2007, a book edited by Nat, titled Mahathir vs. Abdullah: Covert Wars and Challenged Legacies, was published by the publishing arm of Malaysiakini. The book carried commentary by politicians such as Anwar Ibrahim and Lim Guan Eng, and also articles by local commentators and activists.

A month later, Nat joined Parti Keadilan Rakyat (PKR), serving as an aide to Tian Chua, the party's information chief. He later began working for the party's de facto head, Anwar Ibrahim, as Anwar's secretary for work related to the Foundation For the Future, which Anwar was then president of.

=== Detention ===
On 13 July 2007, Tan was detained by three plainclothes policemen, who requested that he bring his notebook computer and follow them to the police headquarters at Bukit Aman. However, Tan's lawyer later stated that according to Bukit Aman, there was no record of his detention. A police report was filed alleging Tan had been kidnapped.

At 10pm that day, roughly six hours after his disappearance, Bukit Aman confirmed that they were holding Tan. Malaysiakini reported that "According to the police, Tan will be held for 24 hours by the Cyber Crime Unit in Jalan Dato Onn to facilitate investigation under the Official Secrets Act," and that Tan's home desktop computer had been seized as well. Shortly afterwards, Tan was transferred to a different police station. It was announced that he would appear before a magistrate the following day for further remand.

On 14 July, Tan was remanded for four days by a magistrate, who rejected the police request for a 14-day remand order, the maximum permitted under the law. The proceedings commenced before the arrival of his lawyers, who later alleged that the investigating police officers intentionally refrained from informing them about the proceedings, and that the court police had also misled the investigating officers about Tan's lawyers' whereabouts.

An investigating officer later confirmed that Tan was being investigated for a potential violation of section 8 of the Official Secrets Act, which pertains to "wrongful communication, etc. of [an] official secret". Tan had reportedly published a comment on his blog alleging corruption on the part of Deputy Internal Security Minister Johari Baharom. After Tan's arrest, Johari announced that he had instructed the police to investigate "lies" published on the internet.

One of Tan's lawyers, R. Sivarasa, stated that the remand order was meant only to "put Nat under duress". Citing the fact that several documents, CDs, and computers had been seized from Tan's office, home and car, Sivarasa stated:

If the remand is for investigation why continue to detain him, when he has given everything? This is a fishing expedition. There's clearly another agenda behind this. ... This is purely an act of oppression. I want to go on record (to say) this detention is politically motivated.

On 18 July, Tan was released at 5.15pm on police bail, but was required to report back to the Commercial Crime Investigation Department in Kuala Lumpur on 31 July.

=== Response to detention ===
After Tan's detention, Anwar condemned his arrest, and called for Tan's family members and lawyers to be given access to him. Parliamentary Opposition Leader Lim Kit Siang condemned "secretive circumstances in the first seven hours of Tan's arrest", calling them "a scandal which speaks of a police which has yet to fully accept that the first principle of policing in a democratic system must be policing for the people and not policing to serve the government leaders of the day". Lim also suggested that Tan might be a "pawn" used by the police and government to "protect their vested interests".

Human rights watchdog Suara Rakyat Malaysia (Suaram) alleged that Tan's rights under the Constitution of Malaysia had been violated:

Under Article 5(3), it is the duty of the police to tell the (detainee) the grounds of arrest as soon as possible and allow Tan to consult his lawyer ... In the case of Tan, he was not told of the ground of arrest but was taken away on the pretext of investigations and the lawyers were not informed of his arrests ... Was the police trying to avoid informing the detainee of the ground of arrest by not making it clear to Tan that it was in fact an arrest?

Other organisations that condemned Tan's detention included the Malaysian Bar Council, the Centre for Independent Journalism and the World Organisation Against Torture (OMCT). The Sun condemned the circumstances surrounding Tan's detention as "attempts at obstructing justice", and called them "politically motivated".

In response to a question in Parliament from Lim about two months after Tan's detention, Prime Minister Abdullah Ahmad Badawi stated that "The arrest and the police report [filed against another blogger] are usual procedures followed by the police."

== Post-detention ==
In early 2008, Kinibooks, the publishing branch of Malaysiakini, published Religion Under Siege?: Lina Joy, the Islamic State and Freedom of Faith, a book Tan co-edited with John Lee about religious and political issues in Malaysia. It later published Tan's and Lee's Political Tsunami: An End to Hegemony in Malaysia? in 2008, and Where is Justice?: Death and Brutality in Custody in late 2009.

In late January 2010, about a month after its release, the Royal Malaysian Police and Home Ministry confiscated copies of Where is Justice? from bookstores in Penang and Malacca, prompting concerns that it may have been banned. The authorities also confiscated copies of 1FunnyMalaysia, another Kinibooks book, claiming that both books "could pose a threat to public order, morality, security". In a statement on his blog, Tan insisted that "We took considerable pains to ensure that everything in Where is Justice was carefully written to be factual, and all opinion therein had been previously published online. ... Don't shoot the messenger." On 5 February 2010, police in Seremban, Negri Sembilan, confiscated 12 copies of Where is Justice? and 10 of 1FunnyMalaysia; an officer who participated in the raid said "We are not banning the books but are just taking them to analyse their content." Malaysiakini is reportedly consulting its lawyers and considering legal action. A few days later, a further eight copies were seized from another Seremban bookstore, and another four from a Johor Bahru bookstore.

Writer and filmmaker Amir Muhammad criticised the seizures, saying: "Every publisher gives five copies of each book to the National Library. So, why can't the authorities borrow the books from there instead of confiscating them from bookstores? If they need it for 'study' or 'review', why can't they buy a copy instead of taking all the copies for free? I'm sure one is enough for their purpose." He also urged bookstores to be proactive in opposing the confiscations, citing a previous instance where "Only one of [Salman] Rushdie's books, The Satanic Verses, was banned by the Home Ministry but MPH removed all of Rushdie's books from the shelves. That's a case in point of booksellers taking a soft stand against the banning of books. This is self-censorship."

Home Ministry deputy secretary-general Ahmad Fuad Ab Aziz later said that the ministry's enforcement officers found the titles to be "offensive" and in violation of the Printing Presses and Publications Act 1984. However, he said the ministry was still deciding whether it would ban the books in question.

Besides writing and publishing, Nathaniel Tan is also very passionate in education. He has served on the Harvard board of interviewers for three years – two of which (2008 and 2009) as an interviewer, and two (2010 and 2011) as an observer. He has also been one of the speakers for several US University Admission talks in Malaysia.

He has previously provided assistance to students applying to US universities. During his first year (2009) in this field, a number of Nat's 25 students were offered admission into Yale, Stanford, Columbia, Cornell, the University of Pennsylvania, and the University of Chicago, among others.

== Hunger strike ==
On August 4, 2021, Tan made the news again in Malaysia by going on a hunger strike calling for five firm actions by the unpopular Perikatan Nasional government under whom COVID-19 cases and deaths were spiralling.

== Bibliography ==
- Tan, Nathaniel (2007). Mahathir vs. Abdullah: Covert Wars & Challenged Legacies. Kuala Lumpur, Malaysia: Kinibooks. ISBN 978-983-40922-3-8. Archived from the original on 27 December 2009.
- Tan, Nathaniel; John Lee (2008). Religion Under Siege?: Lina Joy, the Islamic State and Freedom of Faith. Kuala Lumpur, Malaysia: Kinibooks. ISBN 978-983-40922-4-5. Archived from the original on 28 February 2010.
- Tan, Nathaniel; John Lee (2008). Political Tsunami: An End to Hegemony in Malaysia?. Kuala Lumpur, Malaysia: Kinibooks. ISBN 978-983-40922-5-2. Archived from the original on 6 December 2009.
- Tan, Nathaniel; John Lee (2009). Where is Justice?: Death and Brutality in Custody. Kuala Lumpur, Malaysia: Kinibooks. ISBN 978-983-40922-6-9. Archived from the original on 30 January 2010.
