= Nat Wei, Baron Wei =

British social entrepreneur and advisor on technology

The Right Honourable The Lord Wei
- 韋鳴恩勳爵
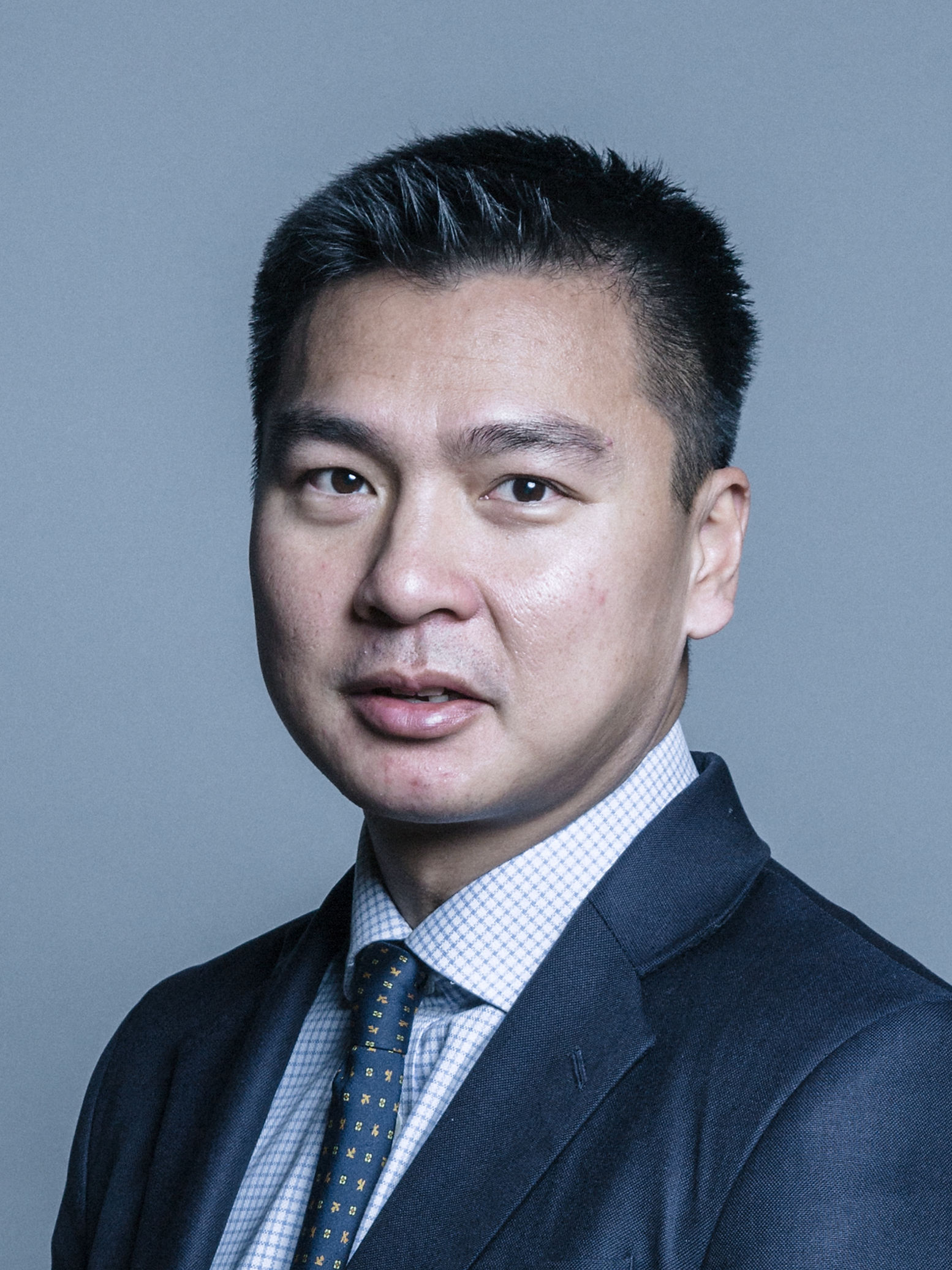

Member of the House of Lords
- Lord Temporal
- Life peerage 28 May 2010

Personal details
- Born: Nathanael Ming-Yan Wei; 19 January 1977 (age 49) Watford, Hertfordshire, England
- Party: Conservative
- Education: BA (Hons) French and German
- Alma mater: Jesus College, Oxford
- Occupation: Member of the House of Lords; Social entrepreneur Technology advisor

Nat Wei, Baron Wei
- Traditional Chinese: 韋鳴恩
- Simplified Chinese: 韦鸣恩
Transcriptions
Standard Mandarin
- Hanyu Pinyin: Wéi Míng'ēn
Yue: Cantonese
- Jyutping: Wai5 Ming4 Jan1

Nathanael Ming-Yan Wei, Baron Wei (Chinese: 韋鳴恩; born 19 January 1977), also known as Nat Wei, is an English social entrepreneur and advisor on technology, with an interest in social reform. He is the first British-born person of Hong Kong origin to have become a member of the House of Lords, sitting as a Conservative, and was the youngest member of the House from 2010 to 2016. He was also previously an adviser to the UK Government on their Big Society project.

Lord Wei is the founding partner of the Shaftesbury Partnership, the founder of Maker Life, a member of the founding team of Teach First and a former adviser at Absolute Return For Kids. He is also a former fellow of the Young Foundation. and World Economic Forum Young Global Leader. Lord Wei has also served as the Chairman of the Conservative Friends of the Chinese, but stepped down in August 2020. He is a business and technology advisor and board member for a number of businesses, including most including most recently Future Planet Capital, and sits as a member of the House of Lords Science and Technology Committee.

== Early life ==
Lord Wei is the son of British Chinese parents from Hong Kong with ancestral roots in Cui Wei Village, Zhongshan, Guangdong, China.

== Education ==
Lord Wei was educated at the Sir Frank Markham Community School, a state comprehensive school in Milton Keynes (since closed, and replaced by the Milton Keynes Academy on the same site), where some of the pupils snorted cocaine and even burned down a wing of the school, and reportedly bullied him for taking his studies seriously. In a later first-person account of his school life, Wei added to his description of his school days, stating that as he 'got good grades, but was also sporty', he was not targeted or bullied. The only pupil from his school year to attend the University of Oxford, he studied Modern Languages at Jesus College.

== Life and career ==
After graduating from Jesus College, Oxford, Wei worked at McKinsey & Company for three years, where he came to know Brett Wigdortz, who founded Teach First in 2002. In 2006, after three years at Teach First and a short stint in social venture capital, Wei joined the children's charity Absolute Return for Kids (ARK) where he helped to set up Future Leaders, a programme seeking to attract, develop and place high-potential teachers and future leaders of urban schools.

=== Founding the Shaftesbury Partnership ===
Around the same time as helping to set up Future Leaders, in early 2006, Wei founded the Shaftesbury Partnership, an organisation which seeks to emulate the great social reformers of the Victorian era by creating scalable social reforms. The Shaftesbury Partnership are currently working on a number of projects around housing, unemployment and healthcare. Through the Shaftesbury Partnership, Wei co-founded The Challenge Network, an independent charity which exists to "inspire and connect people to strengthen their community". The Challenge Network runs a two-month civic service programme called The Challenge which attracted strong interest from both government and opposition when launched.

In 2011, the Shaftesbury Partnership working with Johnson & Johnson and Queens Nursing Institute and Buckinghamshire New University piloted NurseFirst – a clinicians in the community development programme to produce a network of innovators who can create real change for patients, people and communities. In 2013, a report on the pilot, 2 years on, concluded that the first cohort of clinicians showed quantitative and qualitative improvements in their confidence, their leadership skills, their ability to innovate and their ability to make clinical innovation happen. They produced financially sustainable business plans for £1.2 million of cash releasing savings over 3 years.

Lord Wei has actively researched life transitions and published a report into the policy implications of them, which has led to work on later life and the need to better prepare citizens for the transition into retirement. Subsequently Lord Wei has also championed harnessing data science based approaches to help bring greater rigour and consistency to the process of policy development and impact venture incubation, through tools such as agent-based modeling, AI-assisted swarm based prediction and decision-making tools, and technology-aided impact measurement.

Building on his work in education at Teach First and starting other educational initiatives and charities, Lord Wei has advocated for the defense of the right of families to home educate their children without onerous state interference.

=== Advising on technology innovation ===
Lord Wei has been active in the technology world as an advisor, working in venture capital with firms such as Future Planet Capital, as well as with startups such as Dot Investing and Sweetbridge EMEA, working across sectors including real estate, supply chain technology, blockchain/web3, fintech and climate. He and his team claim to offer strategy, impact and technological expertise and he advises boards and founders on innovation and growth.

He has published two 'Wei Reports' into how impact orientated venture capital is becoming more mainstream and how to encourage greater involvement of institutional funders from insurance and pension and sovereign wealth investors to be more engaged and deploy capital into venture capital especially for impact. Many of his recommendations anticipated those announced by the UK government in its Edinburgh Reforms, designed to encourage greater institutional investor allocation to alternative investment such as venture capital in the UK to back UK startups and scale ups.

=== Social reform ===
On 18 May 2010 at the launch of the New Coalition Government policies on Big Society to a group of community leaders, Lord Wei was appointed as an unpaid Government Adviser on Big Society. He was based at the Office for Civil Society in the Cabinet Office where he worked one day a week, and advised the Government on all aspects of taking forward the Big Society and driving implementation across government.

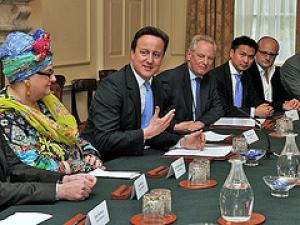
Press Release: General statement in response to Nat Wei’s nomination to House of Lords and appointment as advisor to the Government on Big Society

At the launch event, the Prime Minister, David Cameron, announced that Wei would also be appointed a life peer. He was introduced in the House of Lords on 3 June 2010 as Baron Wei, of Shoreditch in the London Borough of Hackney. He is the third person of Chinese ethnic origin to become a member of the House of Lords, after Baroness Dunn (who is not domiciled in the UK) and the late Lord Chan; the third person of Hong Kong ancestry to become a House of Lords member, after Baroness Dunn and the late Lord Kadoorie; and the first-ever member of Chinese origin to be British-born. He is also one of the youngest people to have been made a life peer, at the age of 33.

Due to his role as government advisor, Lord Wei stepped down from any direct, formal involvement in the organisations he had previously been involved with. On 24 May 2011, Lord Wei announced his decision to step down from his role as Government Advisor on Big Society to help as a volunteer to drive the practical development of Big Society ideas in communities. The Prime Minister, David Cameron said 'Nat has worked incredibly hard over two years to help develop policies that support the Big Society. He has played an important role in delivering key initiatives like Community Organisers, National Citizen Service, and the Big Society Bank." Previously, Lord Wei had also cited personal financial difficulties that he had suffered as a result of the demands of his part-time position.

=== Chinese heritage ===
As the only current ethnic Chinese peer in The House of Lords and the first member of Chinese ethnic origin to have been born and brought up in the UK, Lord Wei takes an interest in British Chinese community issues, particularly in social reform. He is also interested in economic and cultural ties between the UK and China.

Up to July 2015, he worked in Parliament through the All Party Parliamentary Group APPG for East Asian Business which he chaired, the All Party Parliamentary China Group in which he chaired the Hong Kong Sub Committee, and the All Party Parliamentary Group for Trade and Investment of which he was treasurer.

In 2012, Manchester local government commissioned Lord Wei to write a report on how Manchester can best engage with China. Following that Report, a Manchester-China Forum was established which hosts regular activities to help member businesses share information and knowledge, including seminars, meet-the-buyer events, and other networking opportunities. Lord Wei stepped down from advising the Forum in 2022.

Lord Wei reduced his work on UK-China trade relations before 2020 in light of geopolitical strains between the countries, and defended his prior work as seeking to bring understanding and peace through enlarging of trade relations. He was a founding member of the Welcoming Committee for Hong Kongers, which aims to positively influence policy on and has helped bring resources in from government to help with the constructive settling in and support for British National Passport Holders into the UK from Hong Kong.

=== Other ===
In 2013, Lord Wei became a World Economic Forum Young Global Leader.

In 2015, Lord Wei became a member of the House of Lords EU Internal Affairs Sub-Committee and stepped down from this Committee in June 2018. He currently serves as a member of the House of Lords Science and Technology Committee.

== Personal life ==
Lord Wei is a Christian. He is married and has two sons.

== See also ==
- European politicians of Chinese descent

Orders of precedence in the United Kingdom
Preceded by The Lord Hill of Oareford	Gentlemen; Baron Wei	Followed by The Lord Sassoon
