= Michael Chan, Baron Chan =

British physician (1940–2006)

The Right Honourable The Lord Chan MBE

Member of the House of Lords
- Lord Temporal
- Life peerage 2 June 2001 – 21 January 2006

Personal details
- Born: Michael Chew Koon Chan; 6 March 1940 Singapore, Straits Settlements
- Died: 21 January 2006 (aged 65) Liverpool, United Kingdom
- Party: Crossbench
- Spouse: Irene Chee
- Children: 2
- Profession: Physician

Michael Chew Koon Chan, Baron Chan, MBE (Chinese: 曾秋坤; pinyin: Céng Qiūkūn; 6 March 1940 – 21 January 2006), was a Singaporean-born British physician and life peer who sat in the House of Lords between 2001 and 2006.

== Early life and education ==
Chan was born in Singapore on 6 March 1940 to Chieu Kim Chan, then headmaster of Raffles Institution and his wife Rosie.

Chan attended Raffles Institution before moving to the United Kingdom to study medicine at Guy's Hospital Medical School. He was trained as a paediatrician, specialising in blood diseases. He returned to Singapore after his studies, becoming a lecturer and consultant pediatrician at the University of Singapore, but returned to the United Kingdom in 1974 to study Von Willebrand's disease at the University of London Institute of Child Health at Great Ormond Street Hospital.

== Medical career and politics ==
Chan moved to the Liverpool School of Tropical Medicine in 1976, where he remained as a senior clinical lecturer and consultant pediatrician until 1994. He was the director of the National Health Service Ethnic Health Unit in Leeds between 1994 and 1997, and was successively director of two NHS primary health trusts from 1999.

He was also active in the field of race relations, serving as an advisor to the Home Secretary and then as a Commissioner for the Commission for Racial Equality between 1990 and 1995, and as a member of the Sentencing Panel from 1999. He became a member of the Press Complaints Commission in 2002, and he was chairman of the Chinese in Britain Forum. He was a committed Christian and elder of the Liverpool Chinese Gospel Church, undertaking various charitable works, for which he was appointed MBE in 1991.

He was created a life peer (appointed members of the United Kingdom peerage whose titles cannot be inherited, in contrast to hereditary peers) on 2 June 2001, becoming Baron Chan, of Oxton in the County of Merseyside, chosen as a "People's Peer." He sat as a crossbencher. He became the second person of Chinese descent to take a seat in either of the Houses of Parliament, after Baroness Dunn. Chan together with his wife Irene Wei-Len Chee has two children, his son, Stephen, and daughter, Ruth.

Since Chan's death, Lord Wei has been the only ethnic Chinese Peer in the House of Lords, as Baroness Dunn gave up her seat in the Lords in order to retain her non-domiciled tax status following the passing of the Constitutional Reform and Governance Act 2010.

== Arms ==
Coat of arms of Michael Chan, Baron Chan

Crest
A Feng Huang wings displayed and inverted beaked and legged Gules feathered Or Gules Sable and Argent grasping in the beak a Rod of Aesculapius bendwise sinister Sable the serpent Or.
Escutcheon
Barry of ten Argent and Sable on a bend engrailed Or three hibiscus flowers Gules stamens bendwise upwards Gules.
Supporters
On either side a Chinese lion guardant Or the crown eyebrows muzzle and underside Sable resting the interior hindfoot upon a ball Or.
Motto
To Live Is Christ
Badge
A rod Or entwined with a Chinese dragon Gules langued armed and whiskered spined and tail-tufted Or.
