= Julia Wong (politician) =

Norwegian politician (born 1995)

Julia Wong (born 16 May 1995) is a Norwegian politician for the Labour Party.

She served as a deputy representative to the Parliament of Norway from Rogaland during the term 2017–2021. Of Chinese descent, she hails from Sandnes and has been a member of the city council.
