= Nguyễn Thủ Tiệp =

Vietnamese warlord (908–967)

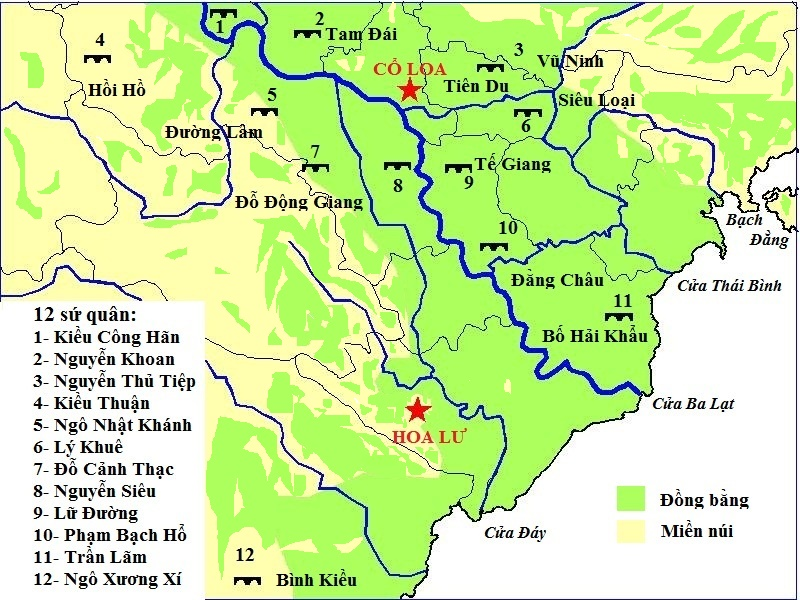
12 Warlords

Nguyễn Thủ Tiệp (chữ Hán: 阮守捷, 908–967) was a warlord of Vietnam during the Period of the 12 Warlords.

Tiệp was a grandson of Nguyễn Hãng, a general from China. Tiệp had an elder brother Nguyễn Khoan and a younger brother Nguyễn Siêu. Both were warlords.

Tiệp occupied Tiên Du (modern Tiên Du District, Bắc Ninh Province). He titled himself Nguyễn Lệnh Công (阮令公) and later changed to Vũ Ninh vương (武寧王).

He was defeated by Đinh Bộ Lĩnh in 967.
