= List of Jewish heads of state and government =

This is a list of former and current heads of state and heads of government who are of Jewish or have a largely Jewish heritage, other than the heads of state and government of Israel. This list includes de facto heads of state and government but does not include acting, caretaker, interim, representative, transitional or temporary heads of state and government.

== Heads of state and heads of government ==
Denotes incumbent heads of state or government
Denotes officer-elect/designated (presumptive)

S.No.	Portrait	Name	Office	Country	Term		Birthplace	Ancestry
1		Samuel ibn Nagrella	Grand Vizier and Nagid	Taifa of Granada, Al-Andalus	1027	1055	Cordoba, Al-Andalus	Sephardic Jewish
2		Yosef ibn Nagrella	Grand Vizier and Nagid	Taifa of Granada, Al-Andalus	1055	30 December 1066	Granada, Al-Andalus	Sephardic Jewish
3		Sa'd al-Dawla al-Safi ibn Hibatullah	Grand Vizier	Ilkhanate, Mongol Empire	1289	1291	Abhar, Iran	Persian Jew
4		Joseph Nasi	Duke of Naxos	Duchy of the Archipelago	1566	1579	Kingdom of Portugal	Portuguese Jewish
5		Luis de Carvajal y de la Cueva	Governor of the New Kingdom of León	New Kingdom of León	1580	1588	Mogadouro, Kingdom of Portugal	Portuguese Jewish
6		Gabriel Milan	Governor of The Danish West Indies	The Danish West Indies	7 May 1684	5 July 1686	Glückstadt, Germany	Sephardic Jewish
7		Juan Lindo	President of El Salvador	El Salvador	28 June 1841	1 February 1842	Tegucigalpa, Honduras	Sephardic Jewish
7		Juan Lindo	President of Honduras	Honduras	2 February 1847	1 February 1852	Tegucigalpa, Honduras	Sephardic Jewish
8		Benjamin Disraeli	Prime Minister of the United Kingdom	United Kingdom	27 February 1868	1 December 1868	Bloomsbury, Middlesex, England, United Kingdom	British Jewish, Italian Jewish
8		Benjamin Disraeli	Prime Minister of the United Kingdom	United Kingdom	20 February 1874	21 April 1880	Bloomsbury, Middlesex, England, United Kingdom	British Jewish, Italian Jewish
9		Julius Vogel	Premier of New Zealand	New Zealand	8 April 1873	6 July 1875	London, United Kingdom	English Jewish
9		Julius Vogel	Premier of New Zealand	New Zealand	15 February 1876	1 September 1876	London, United Kingdom	English Jewish
10		Vaiben Louis Solomon	Premier of South Australia	South Australia	1 December 1899	8 December 1899	Adelaide, South Australia	Australian Jewish
11		Matthew Nathan	Governor of the Gold Coast	Gold Coast	17 December 1900	9 February 1904	London, United Kingdom	English Jewish
11		Matthew Nathan	Governor of Hong Kong	Hong Kong	29 July 1904	29 July 1907	London, United Kingdom	English Jewish
11		Matthew Nathan	Governor of Natal	(South Africa) Colony of Natal	2 September 1907	23 December 1909	London, United Kingdom	English Jewish
12		Alessandro Fortis	Prime Minister of Italy	Italy	28 March 1905	8 February 1906	Forlì, Papal States	Italian Jewish
13		Sidney Sonnino	Prime Minister of Italy	Italy	8 February 1906	29 May 1906	Pisa, Grand Duchy of Tuscany	Italian Jewish father, raised Christian
13		Sidney Sonnino	Prime Minister of Italy	Italy	11 December 1909	31 March 1910	Pisa, Grand Duchy of Tuscany	Italian Jewish father, raised Christian
14		Luigi Luzzatti	Prime Minister of Italy	Italy	31 March 1910	30 March 1911	Venice, Kingdom of Lombardy–Venetia	Italian Jewish
15		Francisco Henríquez y Carvajal	President of the Dominican Republic	Dominican Republic	31 July 1916	29 November 1916	Santo Domingo, Dominican Republic	Dutch Jewish, Sephardic Jewish
16		Lev Kamenev	Chairman of All-Russian Central Executive Committee	Soviet Russia	9 November 1917	21 November 1917	Moscow, Russian Empire	Russian Jewish descent
16		Lev Kamenev	Deputy Premier as part of the Troika	Soviet Russia	May 1922	April 1925	Moscow, Russian Empire	Russian Jewish descent
17		Yakov Sverdlov	Chairman of the All-Russian Central Executive Committee	Soviet Russia	21 November 1917	16 March 1919	Nizhny Novgorod, Russian Empire	Russian Jewish
18		Abraham Schrameck	Governor-general of French Madagascar	French Madagascar	1 August 1918	12 July 1919	Saint-Étienne, France	French Jewish
19		Kurt Eisner	Minister President of the People's State of Bavaria	Bavaria	8 November 1918	21 February 1919	Berlin, Kingdom of Prussia	German Jewish
20		Béla Kun	De facto leader People's Commissar of Foreign Affairs	Hungary	21 March 1919	1 August 1919	Lele, Austria-Hungary	Hungarian Jewish
21		Eugen Leviné	Leader of the Bavarian Soviet Republic	Bavarian Soviet Republic	12 April 1919	3 May 1919	St Petersburg, Russian Empire	Russian Jewish
22		Alexandre Millerand	Prime Minister of France	France	20 January 1920	24 September 1920	Paris, France	His mother was Alsatian Jewish
22		Alexandre Millerand	President of France	France	23 September 1920	11 June 1924	Paris, France	His mother was Alsatian Jewish
23		Herbert Samuel, 1st Viscount Samuel	High Commissioner for Palestine	Mandatory Palestine	1 July 1920	30 June 1925	Liverpool, England	British Jewish
24		Rufus Isaacs, 1st Marquess of Reading	Viceroy and Governor-General of India	British India	2 April 1921	3 April 1926	London, England	British Jewish
25		Zigfrīds Anna Meierovics	Prime Minister of Latvia	Latvia	19 June 1921	26 January 1923	Durbe, Latvia	Latvian Jewish
25		Zigfrīds Anna Meierovics	Prime Minister of Latvia	Latvia	28 June 1923	26 January 1924	Durbe, Latvia	Latvian Jewish
26		Francis Bell	Prime Minister of New Zealand	New Zealand	14 May 1925	30 May 1925	Nelson, New Zealand	New Zealand Jew
27		Sir Isaac Isaacs	Governor-General of Australia	Australia	21 January 1931	23 January 1936	Melbourne, Australia	Polish Jewish
28		Léon Blum	Prime Minister of France	France	4 June 1936	22 June 1937	Paris, France	French Jewish, Alsatian Jewish
28		Léon Blum	Prime Minister of France	France	13 March 1938	10 April 1938	Paris, France	French Jewish, Alsatian Jewish
28		Léon Blum	Prime Minister of France	France	16 December 1946	22 January 1947	Paris, France	French Jewish, Alsatian Jewish
29		Léon Geismar	Acting governor-general of French West Africa	French West Africa	14 July 1938	28 October 1938	Dambach-la-Ville, Alsace-Lorraine	Alsatian Jewish
30		Mátyás Rákosi	General Secretary of the MKP/MDP	Hungary	23 February 1945	18 July 1956	Ada, Austria-Hungary	Hungarian Jewish
30		Mátyás Rákosi	Prime Minister of Hungary	Hungary	14 August 1952	4 July 1953	Ada, Austria-Hungary	Hungarian Jewish
31		Andrew Cohen	Governor of Uganda	Uganda Protectorate	January 1952	1957	Berkhamsted, United Kingdom	British Jewish
32		René Mayer	Prime Minister of France	France	8 January 1953	28 June 1953	Paris, France	French Jewish father
33		Pierre Mendès France	Prime Minister of France	France	18 June 1954	23 February 1955	Paris, France	French Jewish, Portuguese Jewish
34		David Marshall	Chief Minister of Singapore	Singapore	6 April 1955	7 June 1956	Singapore, Straits Settlements	Baghdadi Jewish
35		Ernő Gerő	General Secretary of the Hungarian Working People's Party	Hungary	18 July 1956	25 October 1956	Terbegec, Austria-Hungary	Hungarian Jewish
36		Roy Welensky	Prime Minister of the Federation of Rhodesia and Nyasaland	Rhodesia and Nyasaland	2 November 1956	31 December 1963	Salisbury, Southern Rhodesia	Lithuanian Jewish father, identified as "half Jewish"
37		Michel Debré	Prime Minister of France	France	8 January 1959	14 April 1962	Paris, France	Alsatian Jewish, raised Catholic
38		Joshua Hassan	Chief Minister of Gibraltar	Gibraltar	11 August 1964	6 August 1969	Gibraltar	Gibraltarian Jewish, Sephardic Jewish
38		Joshua Hassan	Chief Minister of Gibraltar	Gibraltar	25 June 1972	8 December 1987	Gibraltar	Gibraltarian Jewish, Sephardic Jewish
39		Bruno Kreisky	Chancellor of Austria	Austria	21 April 1970	24 May 1983	Vienna, Austria-Hungary	Austrian Jewish
40		Sir Zelman Cowen	Governor-General of Australia	Australia	8 December 1977	29 July 1982	Melbourne, Australia	Australian Jewish, Belarusian Jewish
41		Léon Kengo wa Dondo	Prime Minister of the Democratic Republic of the Congo	Democratic Republic of the Congo	5 November 1982	31 October 1986	Libenge, Belgian Congo	Polish Jewish father
41		Léon Kengo wa Dondo	Prime Minister of the Democratic Republic of the Congo	Democratic Republic of the Congo	26 November 1988	4 May 1990	Libenge, Belgian Congo	Polish Jewish father
41		Léon Kengo wa Dondo	Prime Minister of the Democratic Republic of the Congo	Democratic Republic of the Congo	6 July 1994	2 April 1997	Libenge, Belgian Congo	Polish Jewish father
42		Laurent Fabius	Prime Minister of France	France	17 July 1984	20 March 1986	Paris, France	French Jewish, parents converted to Catholicism and was raised Catholic
43		Eric Arturo Delvalle	President of Panama	Panama	28 September 1985	26 February 1988	Panama City, Panama	Panamanian Jewish, Portuguese Jewish
43		Henny Eman	Prime Minister of Aruba	Aruba	1 January 1986	9 February 1989	Aruba	Aruban Jewish
43		Henny Eman	Prime Minister of Aruba	Aruba	29 July 1994	30 October 2001	Aruba	Aruban Jewish
44		Petre Roman	Prime Minister of Romania	Romania	20 June 1990	1 October 1991	Bucharest, Kingdom of Romania	Hungarian Jewish father, showed no interest in Jewish affairs and was married in a Romanian Orthodox wedding ceremony
45		József Antall	Prime Minister of Hungary	Hungary	23 May 1990	12 December 1993	Budapest, Hungary	Hungarian Jewish
46		Ruth Dreifuss	Member of Swiss Federal Council	Switzerland	10 March 1993	31 December 2002	St. Gallen, Switzerland	Swiss Jewish
46		Ruth Dreifuss	President of Switzerland	Switzerland	1 January 1999	31 December 1999	St. Gallen, Switzerland	Swiss Jewish
47		Efraín Goldenberg	Prime Minister of Peru	Peru	17 February 1994	28 July 1995	Lima, Peru	Peruvian Jewish, Romanian Jewish
48		Gyula Horn	Prime Minister of Hungary	Hungary	15 July 1994	6 July 1998	Budapest, Hungary	Hungarian Jewish
49		Janet Jagan	President of Guyana	Guyana	19 December 1997	11 August 1999	Chicago, Illinois, United States	Guyanese Jewish, American Jewish
50		Sergey Kiriyenko	Prime Minister of Russia	Russia	23 March 1998	23 August 1998	Sukhumi, Abkhaz ASSR, Georgian SSR, Soviet Union	Russian Jewish, Georgian Jewish
51		Yevgeny Primakov	Prime Minister of Russia	Russia	11 September 1998	12 May 1999	Kiev, Ukrainian SSR, Soviet Union	Russian Jewish
52		Ricardo Maduro	President of Honduras	Honduras	27 January 2002	27 January 2006	Panama	Honduran Jewish, Portuguese Jewish
53		Zurab Zhvania	Prime Minister of Georgia	Georgia	17 February 2004	3 February 2005	Tbilisi, Georgian SSR, Soviet Union	Armenian Jewish
54		Mikhail Fradkov	Prime Minister of Russia	Russia	5 March 2004	14 September 2007	Samara, Russian SFSR, Soviet Union	Russian Jewish
55		Pedro Pablo Kuczynski	Prime Minister of Peru	Peru	16 August 2005	27 July 2006	Lima, Peru	German Jewish, Peruvian Jewish
55		Pedro Pablo Kuczynski	President of Peru	Peru	28 July 2016	23 March 2018	Lima, Peru	German Jewish, Peruvian Jewish
56		Yehude Simon	Prime Minister of Peru	Peru	14 October 2008	11 July 2009	Lima, Peru	Peruvian Jewish
57		John Key	Prime Minister of New Zealand	New Zealand	19 November 2008	12 December 2016	Auckland, New Zealand	Austrian Jewish mother, he is agnostic and regularly attended church
58		Jan Fischer	Prime Minister of the Czech Republic	Czech Republic	8 May 2009	13 July 2010	Prague, Czechoslovakia	Czech Jewish
59		Mike Eman	Prime Minister of Aruba	Aruba	30 October 2009	17 November 2017	Oranjestad, Aruba	Aruban Jewish
59		Mike Eman	Prime Minister of Aruba	Aruba	28 March 2025	Incumbent	Oranjestad, Aruba	Aruban Jewish
60		Salomón Lerner Ghitis	Prime Minister of Peru	Peru	28 July 2011	10 December 2011	Lima, Peru	Peruvian Jewish
61		Volodymyr Groysman	Prime Minister of Ukraine	Ukraine	14 April 2016	29 August 2019	Vinnytsia, Ukrainian SSR, Soviet Union	Ukrainian Jewish
62		Volodymyr Zelenskyy	President of Ukraine	Ukraine	20 May 2019	Incumbent	Kryvyi Rih, Ukrainian SSR, Soviet Union	Ukrainian Jewish
63		Laurentino Cortizo	President of Panama	Panama	1 July 2019	1 July 2024	Panama City, Panama	Greek Jewish mother, but is a devout Roman Catholic
64		Egils Levits	President of Latvia	Latvia	8 July 2019	8 July 2023	Riga, Latvian SSR, Soviet Union	Latvian Jewish father, does not identify as Jewish
65		Sophie Wilmès	Prime Minister of Belgium	Belgium	27 October 2019	1 October 2020	Ixelles, Brussels, Belgium	Belgian Jewish
66		Mikhail Mishustin	Prime Minister of Russia	Russia	16 January 2020	Incumbent	Lobnya, Russian SFSR	Russian Jewish
67		Élisabeth Borne	Prime Minister of France	France	16 May 2022	9 January 2024	Paris, France	French Jewish, Belgian Jewish, Polish Jewish
68		Aleksandr Rozenberg	Prime Minister of Transnistria	Transnistria	30 May 2022	Incumbent	Ladyzhyn, Ukrainian SSR, Soviet Union	Ukrainian Jewish
69		Gabriel Attal	Prime Minister of France	France	9 January 2024	5 September 2024	Clamart, France	French Jewish, Tunisian Jewish
70		Claudia Sheinbaum	President of Mexico	Mexico	1 October 2024	Incumbent	Mexico City, Mexico	Lithuanian Jewish, Bulgarian Jewish

== Heads of state and heads of government with minor Jewish heritage ==
Some former head of states and government have smaller amounts of Jewish heritage. Boris Johnson, a former prime minister of the United Kingdom whose maternal great-grandfather, Elias Avery Lowe, was a Moscow-born Jew born to a textile merchant, said in a 2007 interview for the Jewish Chronicle, "I feel Jewish when I feel the Jewish people are threatened or under attack, that's when it sort of comes out". David Cameron, another former prime minister of the United Kingdom, has referenced the German Jewish ancestry of one of his great-grandfathers, Arthur Levita, a descendant of the Yiddish author Elia Levita.

Another recent head of state of Jewish heritage is Nicolas Sarkozy, a former president of France. Sarkozy has a Greek Jewish grandfather who converted to Catholicism to marry his French Catholic maternal grandmother. He referred publicly to his Jewish grandfather. Jorge Sampaio is a former president of Portugal whose maternal grandmother was a Sephardi Jew from Morocco. Sampaio said that he is proud of his Jewish ancestry. Xavier Bettel who has served as the prime minister of Luxembourg since 2013 said he has a Polish Jewish grandfather. Former Romanian President Ion Iliescu stated that his grandfather was a Russian Jew who took refuge in Romania. Javier Milei, the current President of Argentina since 2023, revealed in 2024 that his grandfather, a great influence in his life, discovered that he was a Jew from matrilineal descent shortly before his death. His grandfather's maternal grandfather had been a rabbi.

Helmut Schmidt, a former chancellor of West Germany from 1974 to 1982 had Jewish ancestry. His father was born to a German Jewish banker, Ludwig Gumpel, and a Christian waitress, Friederike Wenzel, and then covertly adopted, although this was kept a family secret for many years. Schmidt served in Hitler's Wehrmacht, while managing to hide his Jewish roots from the Nazi regime. Árpád Göncz, a former president of Hungary from 1990 to 2000, had a Jewish maternal grandfather. Carlos Salinas de Gortari, the 60th President of Mexico is of partial Sephardic Jewish descent. He obtained Spanish nationality in early 2021 through the procedure that grants it to descendants of Sephardic Jews.

Although most head of states with Jewish ancestry come from Europe and Latin America, some are from other regions of the World. Laisenia Qarase, a former prime minister of Fiji, has Jewish ancestry. Qarase's mother is the daughter of John Herman Ma'afu Bowman, who had Jewish parents, Alexander Bowman and Sara Annette. Another example is Carlos Veiga, a former prime minister of Cape Verde. He said in a 2018 interview: "my grandfather on my mother's side was Jewish, who came to Cape Verde from Gibraltar in the mid-1840s. He died before I was born and his grave was lost".

Some heads of state claim to have Jewish ancestry, although this is not confirmed. Mexican president Francisco I. Madero's family was widely thought to have been of Portuguese-Jewish heritage. Nicolás Maduro who has served as the president of Venezuela since 2013 said that his "grandparents were Jewish, from a [Sephardic] Moorish background, and converted to Catholicism in Venezuela". Marcelo Rebelo de Sousa who has served as the president of Portugal since 2016 claimed that his mother had Jewish ancestry. Historian Neagu Djuvara also claimed that former Romanian prime minister Arthur Văitoianu's father was a Jew who converted to Eastern Orthodoxy.

== See also ==
- Jewish diaspora
- Aliyah
- Yerida
- List of presidents of Israel: the heads of state of Israel
- List of prime ministers of Israel: the heads of government of Israel
- List of Jewish states and dynasties
- List of heads of state and government of Arab descent
- List of heads of state and government of Chinese descent
- List of heads of state and government of Indian origin
- List of current heads of state and government
