= List of heads of state and government of Indian origin =

This is a list of former and current heads of state and heads of government of sovereign countries who are of full or partial Indian origin where ethnic Indians are a minority. This list includes de facto heads of state and government but does not include acting, caretaker, interim, representative, transitional or temporary heads of state and government.

== Heads of state and heads of government ==
Denotes incumbent heads of state or government
Denotes officer-elect/designated (presumptive)

S.No.	Name (birth–death)	Portrait	Office	Designation	Country	Term		Tenure	Birthplace	Ancestry	Ref.
1	Alfredo Nobre da Costa (1923–1996)		Prime Minister of Portugal	Head of government	Portugal	28 August 1978	22 November 1978	86 days	Lisbon, Portugal	Indo-Portuguese of Goan descent	
2	Mahathir Mohamad (born 1925)		Prime Minister of Malaysia	Head of government	Malaysia	16 July 1981	31 October 2003	24 years, 38 days	Alor Setar, Kedah, Unfederated Malay States	Malaysian Indian of Malayali descent	
2	Mahathir Mohamad (born 1925)		Prime Minister of Malaysia	Head of government	Malaysia	10 May 2018	1 March 2020	24 years, 38 days	Alor Setar, Kedah, Unfederated Malay States	Malaysian Indian of Malayali descent	
3	Devan Nair (1923–2005)		President of Singapore	Head of state	Singapore	23 October 1981	27 March 1985	3 years, 155 days	Jasin, Malacca, Straits Settlements	Indian Singaporean of Malayali descent	
4	Fred Ramdat Misier (1926–2004)		President of Suriname	Head of state	Suriname	8 February 1982	25 January 1988	5 years, 351 days	Paramaribo, Surinam	Indo-Surinamese of Bhojpuri descent	
5	Errol Alibux (born 1948)		Prime Minister of Suriname	Head of government	Suriname	26 February 1983	8 January 1984	316 days	Paramaribo, Surinam	Indo-Surinamese of Bhojpuri descent	
6	Pretaap Radhakishun (1934–2001)		Prime Minister of Suriname	Head of government	Suriname	17 July 1986	7 April 1987	264 days	Paramaribo, Surinam	Indo-Surinamese of Bhojpuri descent	
7	Noor Hassanali (1918–2006)		President of Trinidad and Tobago	Head of state	Trinidad and Tobago	20 March 1987	17 March 1997	9 years, 362 days	San Fernando, Trinidad and Tobago, British West Indies	Indo-Trinidadian and Tobagonian of Bhojpuri descent	
8	Ramsewak Shankar (born 1937)		President of Suriname	Head of state, Head of government	Suriname	25 January 1988	24 December 1990	2 years, 333 days	Nieuw Amsterdam, Surinam	Indo-Surinamese of Bhojpuri descent	
9	Cheddi Jagan (1918–1997)		President of Guyana	Head of state, Head of government	Guyana	9 October 1992	6 March 1997	4 years, 148 days	Port Mourant, British Guiana	Indo-Guyanese of Bhojpuri descent	
10	Basdeo Panday (Note: Recipient of Pravasi Bharatiya Samman, the highest honour of India for Overseas Indians.) (1933–2024)		Prime Minister of Trinidad and Tobago	Head of government	Trinidad and Tobago	9 November 1995	24 December 2001	6 years, 45 days	St. Julien, Trinidad and Tobago, British West Indies	Indo-Trinidadian and Tobagonian of Bhojpuri descent	
11	Mahendra Chaudhry (born 1942)		Prime Minister of Fiji	Head of government	Fiji	19 May 1999	27 May 2000	1 year, 8 days	Ba, British Fiji	Indo-Fijian of Haryanvi descent	
12	Bharrat Jagdeo (born 1964)		President of Guyana	Head of state, Head of government	Guyana	11 August 1999	3 December 2011	12 years, 114 days	Unity, British Guiana	Indo-Guyanese of Awadhi descent	
13	S. R. Nathan (1924–2016)		President of Singapore	Head of state	Singapore	1 September 1999	31 August 2011	11 years, 364 days	Singapore, Straits Settlements	Indian Singaporean of Tamil descent	
14	Kamla Persad-Bissessar (born 1952)		Prime Minister of Trinidad and Tobago	Head of government	Trinidad and Tobago	26 May 2010	9 September 2015	5 years, 108 days	Siparia, Trinidad and Tobago, British West Indies	Indo-Trinidadian and Tobagonian of Bhojpuri and Tamil descent	
14	Kamla Persad-Bissessar (born 1952)		Prime Minister of Trinidad and Tobago	Head of government	Trinidad and Tobago	1 May 2025	Incumbent	1 year, 162 days	Siparia, Trinidad and Tobago, British West Indies	Indo-Trinidadian and Tobagonian of Bhojpuri and Tamil descent	
15	Donald Ramotar (born 1950)		President of Guyana	Head of state, Head of government	Guyana	3 December 2011	16 May 2015	3 years, 164 days	Caria Caria, British Guiana	Indo-Guyanese of Bhojpuri descent	
16	António Costa (born 1961)		Prime Minister of Portugal	Head of government	Portugal	26 November 2015	2 April 2024	8 years, 128 days	Lisbon, Portugal	Indo-Portuguese of Goan descent	
17	Leo Varadkar (born 1979)		Taoiseach	Head of government	Ireland	14 June 2017	27 June 2020	4 years, 127 days	Dublin, Ireland	Irish Indian of Konkani descent	
17	Leo Varadkar (born 1979)		Taoiseach	Head of government	Ireland	17 December 2022	9 April 2024	4 years, 127 days	Dublin, Ireland	Irish Indian of Konkani descent	
18	Halimah Yacob (born 1954)		President of Singapore	Head of state	Singapore	14 September 2017	14 September 2023	6 years, 0 days	Singapore City, British Singapore	Indian Singaporean of Malayali descent	
19	Chan Santokhi (1959–2026)		President of Suriname	Head of state, Head of government	Suriname	16 July 2020	16 July 2025	5 years, 0 days	Lelydorp, Suriname	Indo-Surinamese of Bhojpuri descent	
20	Irfaan Ali (born 1980)		President of Guyana	Head of state, Head of government	Guyana	2 August 2020	Incumbent	6 years, 69 days	Leonora, Guyana	Indo-Guyanese of Bhojpuri descent	
21	Wavel Ramkalawan (born 1961)		President of Seychelles	Head of state, Head of government	Seychelles	26 October 2020	26 October 2025	5 years, 0 days	Mahé, British Seychelles	Indo-Seychellois of Bhojpuri descent	
22	Rishi Sunak (born 1980)		Prime Minister of the United Kingdom	Head of government	United Kingdom	25 October 2022	5 July 2024	1 year, 254 days	Southampton, England, United Kingdom	British Indian of Punjabi descent	
23	Christine Kangaloo (born 1961)		President of Trinidad and Tobago	Head of state	Trinidad and Tobago	20 March 2023	Incumbent	3 years, 204 days	San Fernando, Trinidad and Tobago, West Indies Federation	Indo-Trinidadian and Tobagonian of Bhojpuri descent	
24	Stuart Young (born 1975)		Prime Minister of Trinidad and Tobago	Head of government	Trinidad and Tobago	17 March 2025	1 May 2025	45 days	Port of Spain, Trinidad and Tobago	Indo-Trinidadian and Tobagonian of Bhojpuri descent	

== See also ==
- List of foreign politicians of Indian origin
- Indian diaspora
- Overseas Citizenship of India
- Girmitiyas
- Kapitan Keling
- Lascars
- Indian indenture system
- Indian Arrival Day
- Pravasi Bharatiya Divas
- Pravasi Bharatiya Samman
- List of presidents of India: the heads of state of India
- List of prime ministers of India: the heads of government of India
- List of Hindu empires and dynasties
- List of heads of state and government of Arab descent
- List of heads of state and government of Chinese descent
- List of Jewish heads of state and government
- List of current heads of state and government
