= List of heads of state and government of Arab descent =

This is a list of former and current heads of state and heads of government of sovereign countries who are of full or partial Arab descent where ethnic Arabs are a minority. This list includes de facto heads of state and government but does not include acting, caretaker, interim, representative, transitional or temporary heads of state and government.

== Heads of state and heads of government ==
Denotes incumbent heads of state or government
Denotes officer-elect/designated (presumptive)

S.No.	Name	Portrait	Title	Country	Tenure	Descent
1	Juan Pereda		President of Bolivia	Bolivia	1978	Palestine
2	Julio César Turbay Ayala		President of Colombia	Colombia	1978–1982	Lebanon
3	Edward Seaga		Prime minister of Jamaica	Jamaica	1980–1989	Lebanon
4	Jacobo Majluta		President of the Dominican Republic	Dominican Republic	1982	Lebanon
5	Carlos Menem		President of Argentina	Argentina	1989–1999	Syria
6	Robert Malval		Prime Minister of Haiti	Haiti	1993–1994	Lebanon
7	Jorge Serrano Elías		President of Guatemala	Guatemala	1991–1993	Lebanon
8	Abdalá Bucaram		President of Ecuador	Ecuador	1996–1997	Lebanon
9	Carlos Roberto Flores		President of Honduras	Honduras	1998–2000	Palestine
10	Said Musa		Prime minister of Belize	Belize	1998–2008	Palestine
11	Jamil Mahuad		President of Ecuador	Ecuador	1998–2000	Lebanon
12	Antonio Saca		President of El Salvador	El Salvador	2004–2009	Palestine
13	Michel Temer		President of Brazil	Brazil	2016–2019	Lebanon
14	Mario Abdo Benítez		President of Paraguay	Paraguay	2018–2023	Lebanon
15	Nayib Bukele		President of El Salvador	El Salvador	2019–present	Palestine
16	Luis Abinader		President of the Dominican Republic	Dominican Republic	2020–present	Lebanon
17	Nasry Asfura		President of Honduras	Honduras	2026–present	Palestine

== See also ==
- Arab diaspora
- List of heads of state and government of Chinese descent
- List of heads of state and government of Indian origin
- List of Jewish heads of state and government
- List of current heads of state and government
