= List of heads of state and government of Chinese descent =

This is a list of former and current heads of state and heads of government of sovereign countries who are of full or partial Chinese descent where ethnic Chinese are a minority. This list includes de facto heads of state and government but does not include acting, caretaker, interim, representative, transitional or temporary heads of state and government.

== Heads of state and heads of governments ==
Denotes incumbent heads of state or government
Denotes officer-elect/designated (presumptive)

S.No.	Name (Note: There may be different variants of Chinese transliteration for a non-Chinese name. For example, the actual Chinese name of Yingluck Shinawatra is "丘英樂” but is usually rendered as "英拉·西那瓦" in mainland China, "英祿·西那瓦" in Hong Kong and Macau, "盈拉·欽那瓦" in Taiwan, "英叻·欽那瓦" in Malaysia and Singapore, and "英樂·秦那越" in Thailand. These transliterated non-Chinese names are in italic.)	Portrait	Title	Country	Tenure	Descent
1	Emilio Aguinaldo 埃米利奧·阿奎納多		President of the Philippines	Philippine Republic	1899–1901	Chinese mestizo
2	Phraya Manopakorn Nitithada 披耶·瑪奴巴功		Prime Minister of Thailand	Thailand	1932–1933	Thai Chinese
3	Phraya Phahonphonphayuhasena 披耶帕鳳·豐派育哈色納		Prime Minister of Thailand	Thailand	1933–1938	Thai Chinese
4	Manuel L. Quezon 曼努埃爾·奎松		President of the Philippines	Philippines Commonwealth	1935–1944	Chinese mestizo
5	Plaek Phibunsongkhram貝·鑾披汶頌堪		Prime Minister of Thailand	Thailand	1938–1944, 1948–1957	Thai Chinese
6	Sergio Osmeña 吳文釗 塞爾吉奧·奧斯梅尼亞		President of the Philippines	Philippines Commonwealth	1944–1946	
7	Sơn Ngọc Thành 山玉成		Prime Minister of Cambodia	Kingdom of Kampuchea	1945, 1972	
7	Sơn Ngọc Thành 山玉成		Prime Minister of Cambodia	Khmer Republic	1945, 1972	
8	Seni Pramoj 社尼·巴莫		Prime Minister of Thailand	Thailand	1945–1946, 1975, 1976	Thai Chinese
9	Pridi Banomyong 比里·帕儂榮		Prime Minister of Thailand	Thailand	1946	Thai Chinese
10	Thawan Thamrongnawasawat 鄭連淡 鑾探隆·那瓦沙瓦		Prime Minister of Thailand	Thailand	1946–1947	Thai Chinese
11	Pote Sarasin 乃朴·沙拉信		Prime Minister of Thailand	Thailand	1957	Thai Chinese
12	Thanom Kittikachorn 他儂·吉滴卡宗		Prime Minister of Thailand	Thailand	1958, 1963–1973	Thai Chinese
13	Ne Win 奈溫		Prime Minister of Myanmar	Burma	1958–1960, 1962–1974	Chinese Burmese
13	Ne Win 奈溫		President of Myanmar	Burma	1974–1981	Chinese Burmese
14	Sarit Thanarat 沙立·他那叻		Prime Minister of Thailand	Thailand	1959–1963	
15	Ferdinand Marcos 費迪南德·馬科斯		President of the Philippines	Philippines	1965–1986	
15	Ferdinand Marcos 費迪南德·馬科斯		Prime Minister of the Philippines	Philippines	1978–1981	
16	Lon Nol 朗諾		Prime Minister of Cambodia	Kingdom of Cambodia	1966–1967, 1969–1971	
16	Lon Nol 朗諾		President of Cambodia	Khmer Republic	1972–1975	
17	Arthur Chung 鍾亞瑟		President of Guyana	Guyana	1970–1980	Chinese Guyanese
18	Cheng Heng 鄭興		President of Cambodia	Khmer Republic	1970–1972	
19	Kukrit Pramoj 克立·巴莫		Prime Minister of Thailand	Thailand	1975–1976	Thai Chinese
20	James Mancham 詹姆斯·曼卡姆		President of Seychelles	Seychelles	1976–1977	Chinese on paternal side
21	Khieu Samphan 喬森潘		Head of State of Cambodia	Kampuchea	1976–1979	
22	Pol Pot 波爾布特		Prime Minister of Cambodia	Kampuchea	1976–1979	
23	Thanin Kraivichien 他寧·蓋威遷		Prime Minister of Thailand	Thailand	1976–1977	Thai Chinese
24	Kriangsak Chamanan 江薩·差瑪南		Prime Minister of Thailand	Thailand	1977–1980	Thai Chinese
25	Julius Chan 陳仲民		Prime Minister of Papua New Guinea	Papua New Guinea	1980–1982, 1994–1997, 1997	Chinese Taishanese father
26	Henk Chin A Sen 陳亞先		Prime Minister of Suriname	Suriname	1980–1982	
26	Henk Chin A Sen 陳亞先		President of Suriname	Suriname	1980–1982	
27	San Yu 山友		President of Myanmar	Burma	1981–1988	Chinese Burmese
28	Chan Sy 姜西		Prime Minister of Cambodia	Kampuchea People's Republic	1982–1984	
29	Hun Sen 洪森		Prime Minister of Cambodia	Kampuchea People's Republic	1984–2023	Teochew
29	Hun Sen 洪森		Prime Minister of Cambodia	State of Cambodia	1984–2023	Teochew
29	Hun Sen 洪森		Prime Minister of Cambodia	Cambodia	1984–2023	Teochew
30	Corazon Aquino 許娜桑 科拉松·阿基諾		President of the Philippines	Philippines	1986–1992	
31	Roh Tae-woo 盧泰愚		President of South Korea	South Korea	1988–1993	Shandong Peninsula
32	Chatichai Choonhavan 差猜·春哈旺		Prime Minister of Thailand	Thailand	1988–1991	
33	Anand Panyarachun 阿南·班雅拉春		Prime Minister of Thailand	Thailand	1991–1992	
34	Chea Sim 謝辛		Head of State of Cambodia	State of Cambodia	1992–1993	
35	Suchinda Kraprayoon 蘇欽達·甲巴允		Prime Minister of Thailand	Thailand	1992-1992	
36	Chuan Leekpai 呂基文 川·立派		Prime Minister of Thailand	Thailand	1992–1995, 1997–2001	Thai Chinese Hokkien
37	Banharn Silpa-archa 馬德祥 班漢·西巴阿差		Prime Minister of Thailand	Thailand	1995–1996	Thai Chinese
38	Chavalit Yongchaiyudh 差瓦立·永猜裕		Prime Minister of Thailand	Thailand	1996–1997	
39	Abdurrahman Wahid 阿卜杜拉赫曼·瓦希德		President of Indonesia	Indonesia	1999–2001	
40	Thaksin Shinawatra 丘達新 他信·西那瓦		Prime Minister of Thailand	Thailand	2001–2006	
41	Abdullah Ahmad Badawi 阿都拉·阿末·巴達威		Prime Minister of Malaysia	Malaysia	2003–2009	Grandfather is Chinese Born Cham
42	Roh Moo-hyun 盧武鉉		President of South Korea	South Korea	2003–2008	
43	George Maxwell Richards 喬治·馬克斯韋爾·理查茲		President of Trinidad and Tobago	Trinidad and Tobago	2003–2013	
44	Anote Tong 湯安諾		President of Kiribati	Kiribati	2003–2016	
45	Khin Nyunt 欽紐		Prime Minister of Myanmar	Myanmar	2003–2004	Chinese Burmese
46	Samak Sundaravej 沙馬·順達衛		Prime Minister of Thailand	Thailand	2008	
47	Abhisit Vejjajiva 阿披實·威差奇瓦		Prime Minister of Thailand	Thailand	2008–2011	Thai Chinese
48	Benigno Aquino III 許漸華 貝尼格諾·阿基諾三世		President of the Philippines	Philippines	2010–2016	
49	Dési Bouterse 德西·鮑特瑟		President of Suriname	Suriname	2010–2020	
50	Yingluck Shinawatra 丘英樂 英拉·西那瓦		Prime Minister of Thailand	Thailand	2011–2014	Thai Chinese
51	Luis Guillermo Solís 路易斯·吉列爾莫·索利斯		President of Costa Rica	Costa Rica	2014–2018	
52	Rodrigo Duterte 羅德里戈·杜特爾特		President of the Philippines	Philippines	2016–2022	
53	Bongbong Marcos 小費迪南德·馬科斯		President of the Philippines	Philippines	2022–present	
54	Hun Manet 洪玛奈		Prime Minister of Cambodia	Cambodia	2023–present	
55	Srettha Thavisin 賽塔·塔維辛		Prime Minister of Thailand	Thailand	2023–2024	
56	Paetongtarn Shinawatra 貝東丹·欽那瓦		Prime Minister of Thailand	Thailand	2024–2025	
57	Stuart Young 斯圖爾特·楊		Prime Minister of Trinidad and Tobago	Trinidad and Tobago	2025	Chinese Trinidadian
58	Anutin Charnvirakul 陳錫堯		Prime Minister of Thailand	Thailand	2025–Present	Thai Chinese

== See also ==
- List of foreign politicians of Chinese descent
- European politicians of Chinese descent
- Chinese emigration
- Kapitan Cina
- List of Kapitan Cina
- Overseas Chinese
- List of overseas Chinese
- List of leaders of the People's Republic of China: the heads of state and government of China
- List of leaders of the Republic of China: the heads of state and government of Taiwan
- List of Confucian states and dynasties
- List of heads of state and government of Arab descent
- List of heads of state and government of Indian origin
- List of Jewish heads of state and government
- List of current heads of state and government
