= Beth Israel Synagogue (Oranjestad, Aruba) =

Synagogue in Gelderland, Netherlands

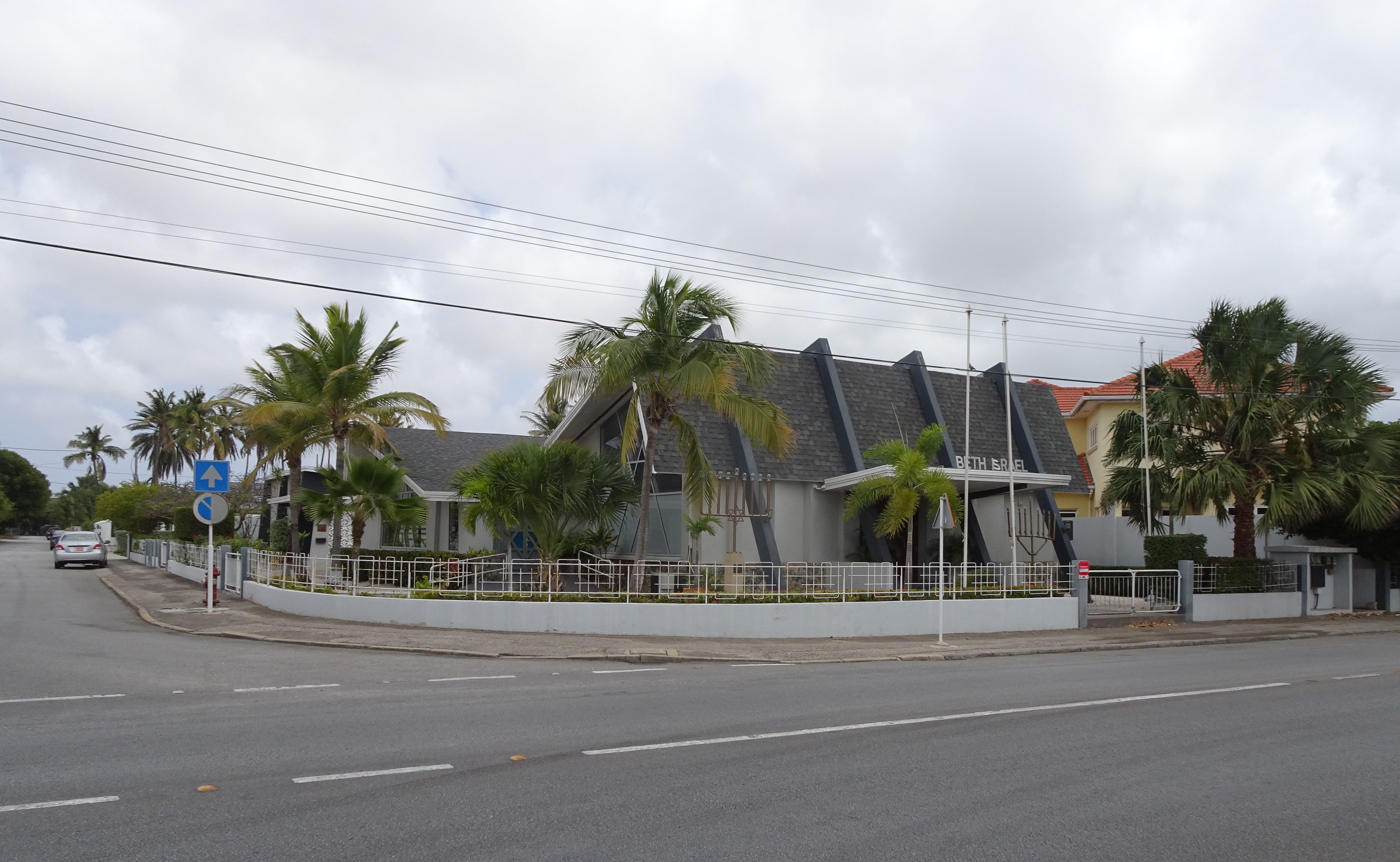
- The synagogue in 2019

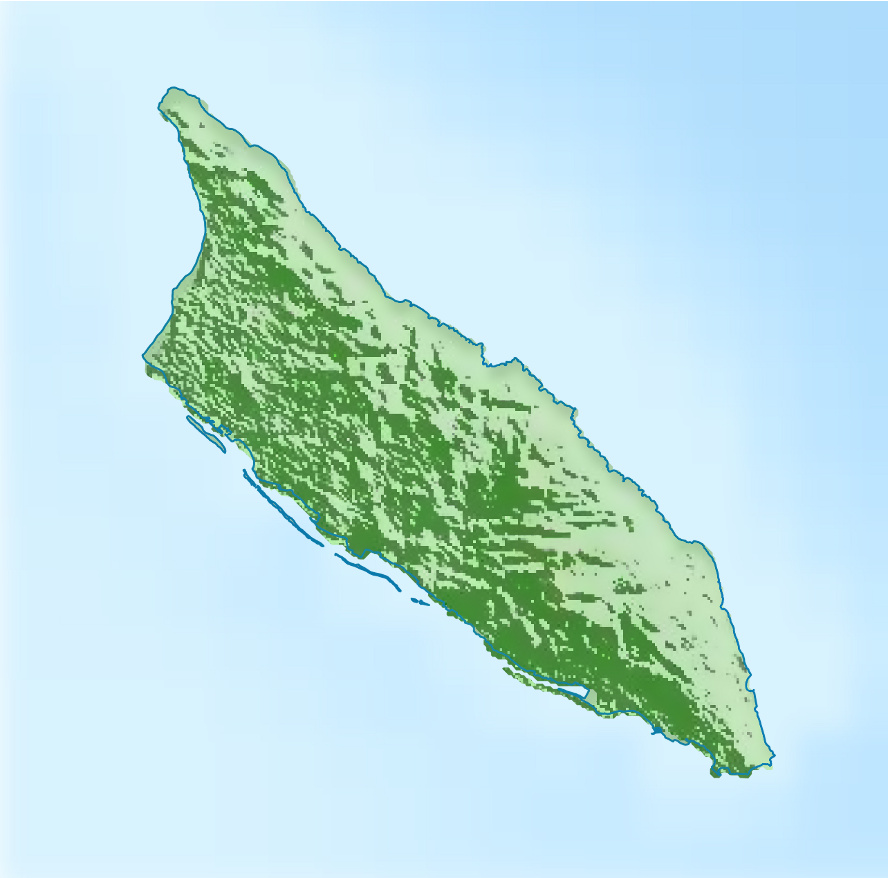
- Location of the synagogue in Aruba

Religion
- Affiliation: Reform Judaism
- Rite: Nusach Ashkenaz; Sephardi
- Ecclesiastical or organizational status: Synagogue
- Leadership: Rabbi Alberto (Baruch) Zeilicovich
- Status: Active

Location
- Location: Adriaan Laclé Boulevard 2, Oranjestad
- Country: Aruba
- Interactive map of Beth Israel Synagogue
- Coordinates: 12°30′47″N 70°01′49″W

Architecture
- Type: Synagogue architecture
- Established: December 1, 1956 (as a congregation)
- Completed: 1962
- Materials: Brick

Website
- bethisraelaruba.com

The Beth Israel Synagogue is a Progressive Jewish congregation and synagogue, located at Adriaan Laclé Boulevard 2, in Oranjestad, Aruba. Established as a congregation in 1956, the synagogue was completed in 1962. The Aruban Jewish community is an independent congregation with a liberal style similar to Reform or Conservative Judaism.

The rabbi, since September 2022, is Rabbi Alberto (Baruch) Zeilicovich.

== Community ==
The community consists mostly of Jewish immigrants that arrived in Aruba from different parts of the world, and made it their home. After 1924, a large group of Eastern European Jews, mostly from Poland, settled here, together with Jews from the Netherlands and Sephardic families from Suriname, another Dutch colony at that time. The community opened a Jewish center in 1942 – the Jewish Country Club – and four years later, with the arrival of some Holocaust survivors, the community was officially organized.

Today, there are about 75 members, plus 180 overseas members. Due to its small size, and the intimate, close knit nature of the community, one joint organization was formed, blending the Sephardic with the Ashkenazic traditions, respecting the common culture, and enjoying the differences.

== See also ==
- History of the Jews in Aruba
- List of synagogues in the Netherlands
