= List of prime ministers of India by previous experience =

This is a list of prime ministers of India by previous experience. Offices assumed after assuming the role of Prime Minister

== Analysis ==
Seven Indian prime ministers have been active participants in the Indian independence movement.

== List ==
No.	Name	Previous public office held and occupation	Assumed office of Prime Minister
1	Jawaharlal Nehru	Vice President of the Executive Council (2 September 1946 – 15 August 1947); Indian Independence activist; Advocate in the Allahabad High Court	15 August 1947
2	Lal Bahadur Shastri	Minister of Home Affairs (4 April 1961 – 29 August 1963); Minister of Railways (1951–1956); Indian Independence activist	9 June 1964
3	Indira Gandhi	Indian Independence activist; Minister of Information and Broadcasting (9 June 1964 – 24 January 1966)	24 January 1966
4	Morarji Desai	Deputy Prime Minister of India (13 March 1967 – 16 July 1969); Minister of Finance (13 March 1958 – 29 August 1963; 13 March 1967 – 16 July 1969); Chief Minister of Bombay State (21 April 1952 – 31 October 1956); Indian Independence activist	24 March 1977
5	Charan Singh	Deputy Prime Minister of India (24 January 1979 – 28 July 1979); Minister of Finance (24 January 1979 – 28 July 1979); Minister of Home Affairs (24 March 1977 – 1 July 1978); Chief Minister of Uttar Pradesh (3 April 1967 – 25 February 1968); Indian Independence activist	28 July 1979
6	Rajiv Gandhi	Member of Parliament, Lok Sabha (17 August 1981 – 21 May 1991)	31 October 1984
7	V. P. Singh	Minister of Finance (31 December 1984 – 23 January 1987); Leader of the House in Rajya Sabha (December 1984 – April 1987); Member of Parliament, Rajya Sabha (1983–1988); Chief Minister of Uttar Pradesh (9 June 1980 – 19 July 1982)	2 December 1989
8	Chandra Shekhar	Member of Parliament, Lok Sabha	10 November 1990
9	P. V. Narasimha Rao	Minister of Home Affairs (19 July 1984 – 31 December 1984; 12 March 1986 – 12 May 1986); Minister of External Affairs (14 January 1980 – 19 July 1984; 25 June 1988 – 2 December 1989); Chief Minister of Andhra Pradesh (30 September 1971 – 10 January 1973)	21 June 1991
10	Atal Bihari Vajpayee	Minister of External Affairs (26 March 1977 – 28 July 1979); Leader of the Opposition (Lok Sabha) (21 July 1993 – 10 May 1996) (1 June 1996 – 4 December 1997)	16 May 1996 19 March 1998 13 October 1999
11	H. D. Deve Gowda	Chief Minister of Karnataka (11 December 1994 – 31 May 1996)	1 June 1996
12	Inder Kumar Gujral	Leader of the House in Rajya Sabha (June 1996 – November 1996); Minister of External Affairs (5 December 1989 – 10 November 1990; 1 June 1996 – 19 March 1998); Ambassador of India to the Soviet Union (1976–1980); Minister of Information and Broadcasting (1973–1975); Indian Independence activist	21 April 1997
13	Manmohan Singh	Leader of the Opposition in Rajya Sabha (21 March 1998 – 21 May 2004); Minister of Finance (21 June 1991 – 16 May 1996); Deputy Chairman of the Planning Commission (15 January 1985 – 31 August 1987); Governor of the Reserve Bank of India (15 September 1982 – 15 January 1985); Chief Economic Advisor to the Government of India (1972–1976)	22 May 2004
14	Narendra Modi	Chief Minister of Gujarat (7 October 2001 – 22 May 2014)	26 May 2014
