= List of prime ministers of India =

The prime minister of India is the chief executive of the Government of India and chair of the Union Council of Ministers. Although the president of India is the constitutional, nominal, and ceremonial head of state, in practice and ordinarily, the executive authority is vested in the prime minister and their chosen Council of Ministers. The prime minister is the leader elected by the party or alliance with a majority in the lower house of the Indian parliament, the Lok Sabha, which is the main legislative body in the Republic of India. The prime minister and their cabinet are at all times responsible to the Lok Sabha. The prime minister can be a member of either the Lok Sabha or the Rajya Sabha, the upper house of the parliament. The prime minister ranks third in the order of precedence.

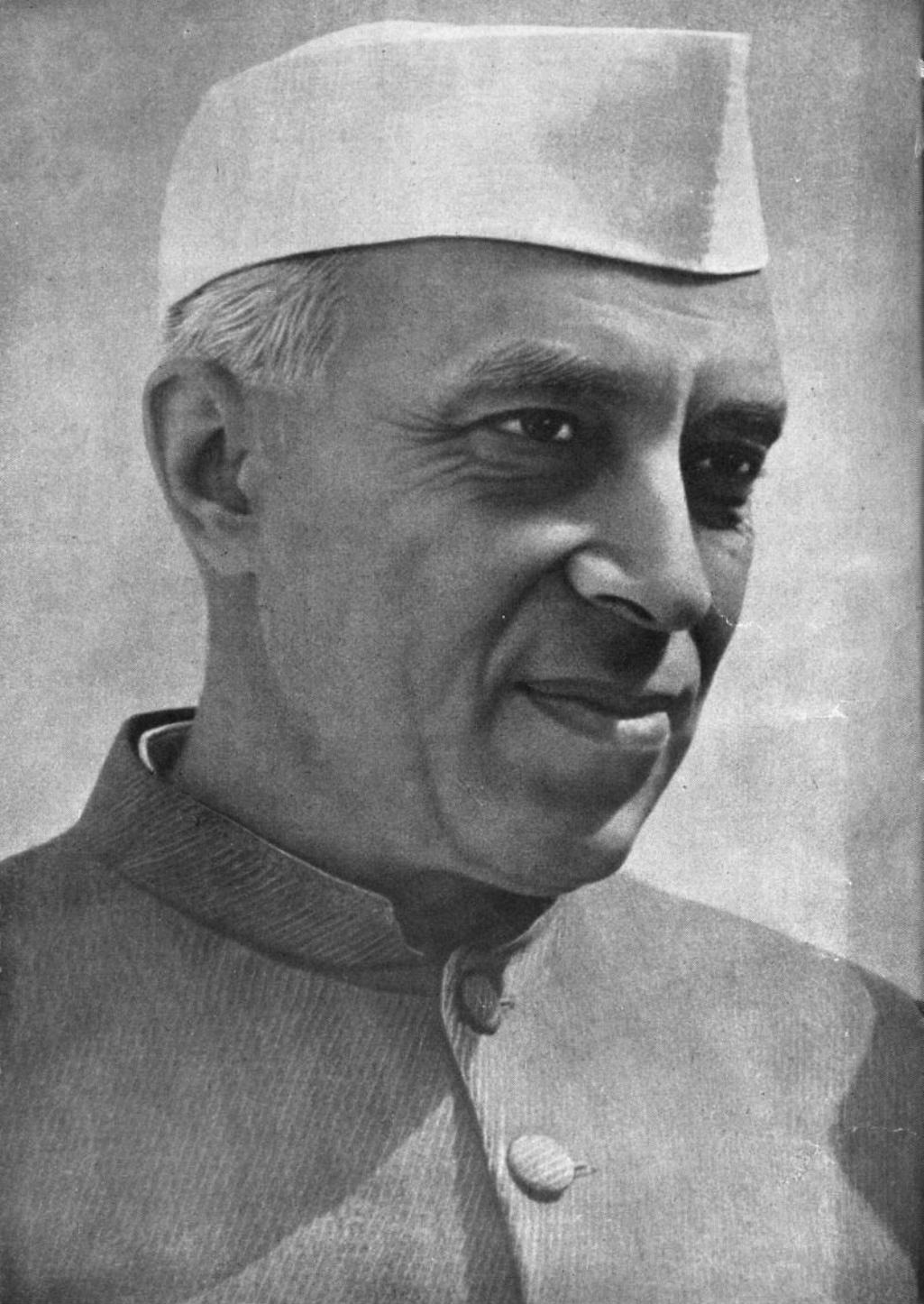
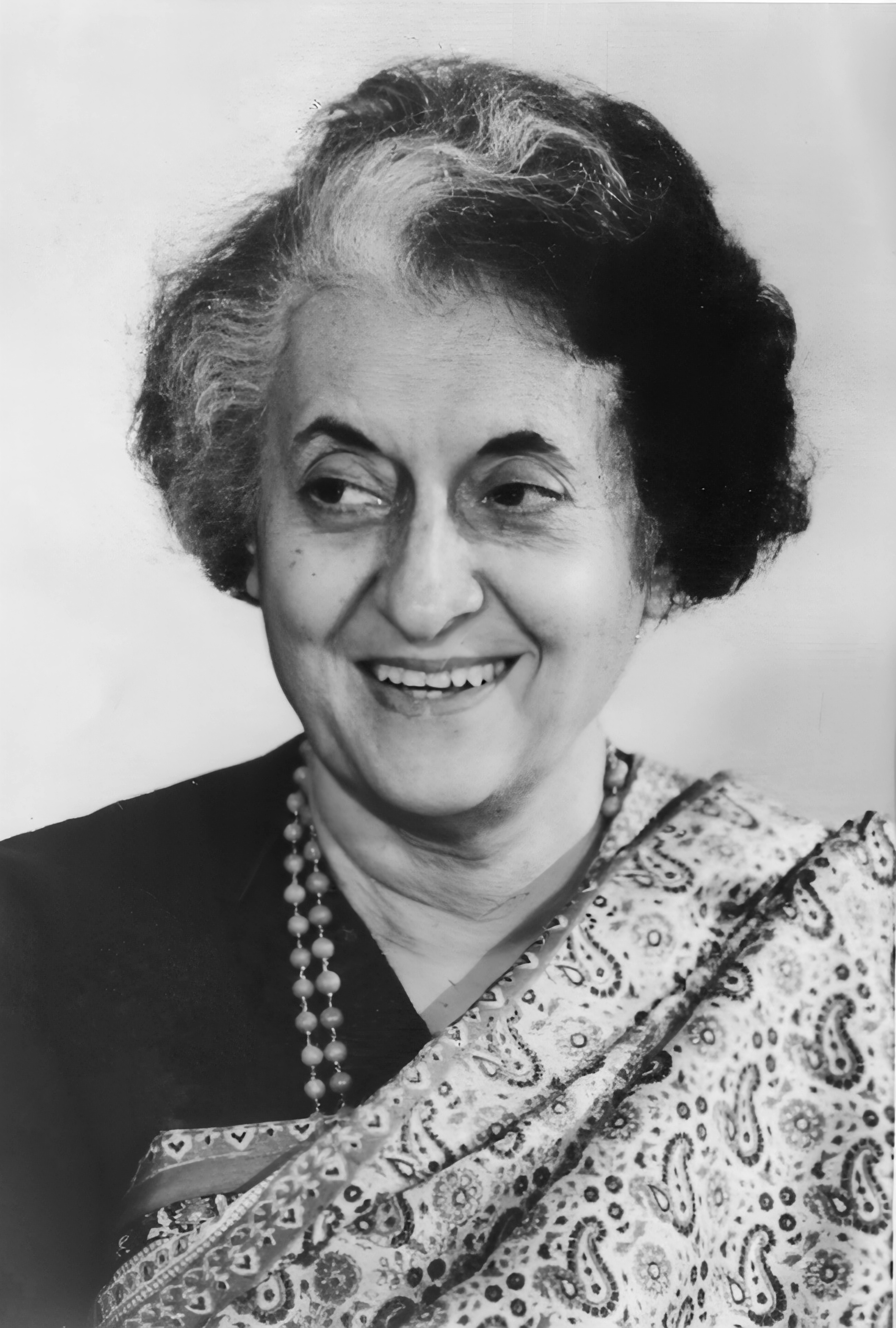
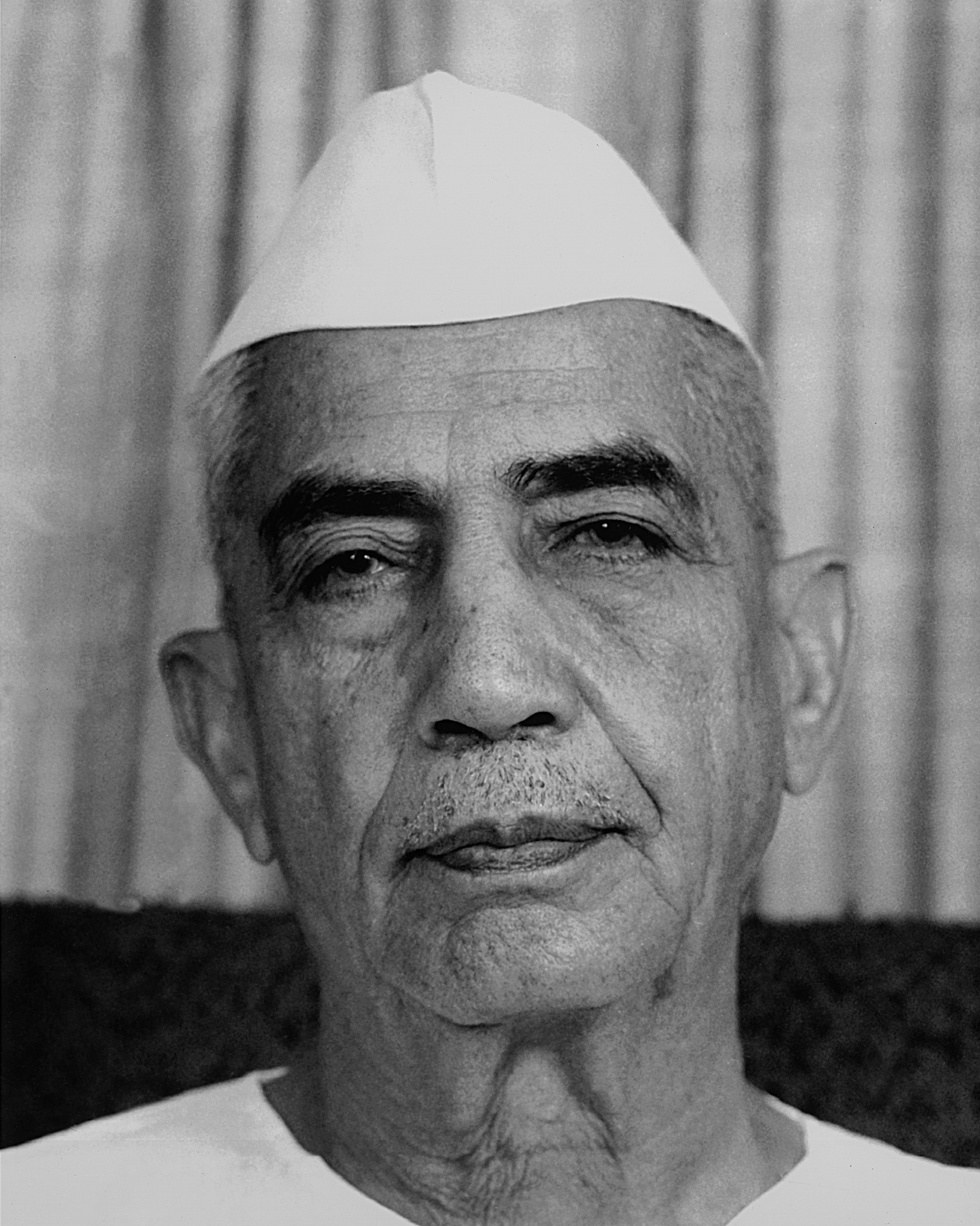
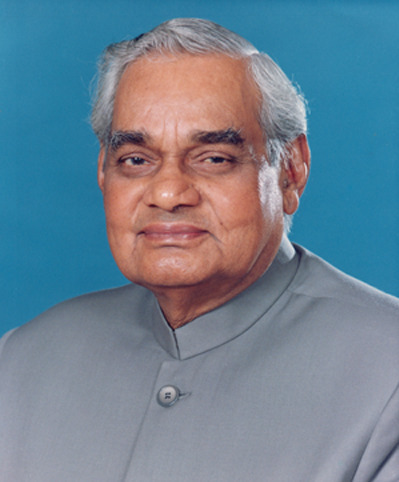
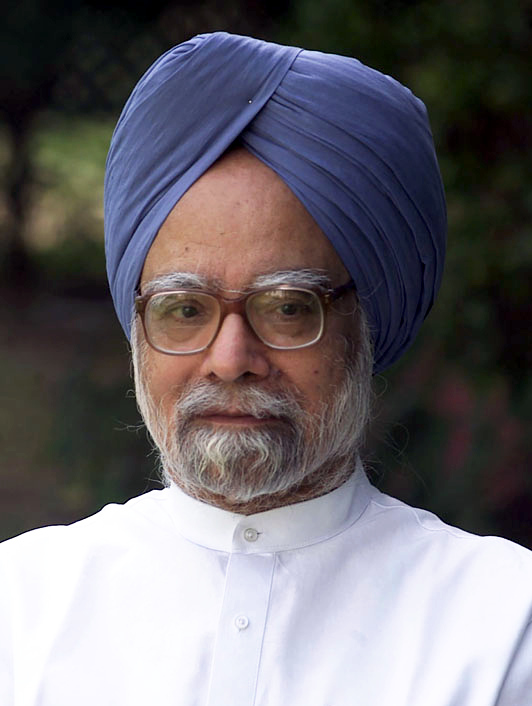
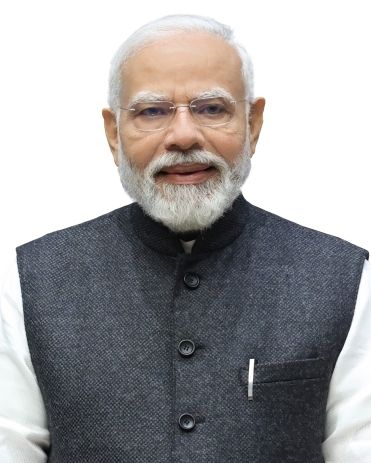
- Top left: Jawaharlal Nehru was the first and the longest-serving prime minister in Indian history (no of days in office).
- Top centre: Indira Gandhi was the first and only woman to serve as prime minister.
- Top right: Charan Singh was the only prime minister in Indian history who never faced parliament.
- Bottom left: Atal Bihari Vajpayee was the first non-Congress prime minister to complete a full 5 year term.
- Bottom centre: Manmohan Singh was the first prime minister from a minority religion.
- Bottom right: Narendra Modi is the only prime minister to be born in independent India and is the longest-serving elected prime minister (continuous term).

The prime minister is appointed by the president of India; however, the prime minister has to enjoy the confidence of the majority of Lok Sabha members, who are directly elected every five years, unless a prime minister resigns. The prime minister is the presiding member of the Council of Ministers of the Union government. The prime minister unilaterally controls the selection and dismissal of members of the council; and allocation of posts to members within the government. This council, which is collectively responsible to the Lok Sabha as per Article 75(3), assists the president regarding the operations under the latter's powers; however, by the virtue of Article 74 of the Constitution, such 'aid and advice' tendered by the council is binding.

India has had 14 prime ministers. (Note: 15 including Gulzarilal Nanda who twice acted in the role, of which 7 having at least one full term, ruling country for about 70 years.) Jawaharlal Nehru was India's first prime minister. Beginning from 1946, Nehru secured a major victory in 1946 Indian Constituent Assembly election and served as prime minister of the Interim Government of India during the British Raj from 2 September 1946 until 14 August 1947. Earlier, his party the Indian National Congress won the 1946 Indian provincial elections. He served as the prime minister of the Dominion of India from 15 August 1947 until 26 January 1950, and thereafter of the Republic of India until his death in May 1964. Nehru was succeeded by Lal Bahadur Shastri, whose 1 year 7-month term ended in his death in Tashkent, then in the USSR, where he had signed the Tashkent Declaration between India and Pakistan. Indira Gandhi, Nehru's daughter, succeeded Shastri in 1966 to become the country's first female prime minister. Eleven years later, her party, the Indian National Congress, lost the 1977 Indian general election to the Janata Party, whose leader Morarji Desai became the first non-Congress prime minister. After Desai resigned in 1979, his former associate Charan Singh briefly held office until the Congress won the 1980 Indian general election and Indira Gandhi returned as prime minister. Her second term as prime minister ended five years later on 31 October 1984, when she was assassinated by her bodyguards. Her son Rajiv Gandhi was sworn in as India's youngest premier. Members of Nehru–Gandhi family have been prime minister for approximately 38 years. After a general election loss, Rajiv Gandhi's five-year term ended; his former cabinet colleague, V. P. Singh of the Janata Dal, formed the year-long National Front coalition government in 1989. A seven-month interlude under prime minister Chandra Shekhar followed, after which the Congress party returned to power, forming the government under P. V. Narasimha Rao in June 1991, Rajiv Gandhi having been assassinated earlier that year. Rao's five-year term was succeeded by four short-lived governments—Atal Bihari Vajpayee from the Bharatiya Janata Party (BJP) for 13 days in 1996, a year each under United Front prime ministers H. D. Deve Gowda and Inder Kumar Gujral, and Vajpayee again for 13 months in 1998–1999.

In 1999, Vajpayee's Bharatiya Janata Party led National Democratic Alliance (NDA) won the general election, the first non-Congress alliance to do so, and he served a full five-year term as prime minister.

The Indian National Congress and its United Progressive Alliance (UPA) won the general elections in 2004 and 2009, Manmohan Singh serving as prime minister between 2004 and 2014.

The Bharatiya Janata Party won the 2014 Indian general election, and its parliamentary leader Narendra Modi formed the first non-Congress single-party majority government. The BJP retained power in the 2019 Indian general election with an expanded majority, granting a second term for the incumbent government. Following the 2024 Indian general election, Modi was sworn in for a third consecutive term as prime minister, heading a coalition government after the BJP lost its outright majority in the Lok Sabha.

== List ==
Key

- No.: Incumbent number
- ^{†} Assassinated or died in office
- ^{§} Returned to office after a previous non-consecutive term
- ^{RES} Resigned
- ^{NC} Resigned following a no-confidence motion

Portrait	Name (born – died) Constituency	Age when assumed office	Term of office Duration in years and days			Election	Concurrent ministerial positions	Party	Ministry	Head of State (Tenure)
	Jawaharlal Nehru (1889–1964) MP for United Provinces (1947–1952) and Phulpur	57 years 274 days	15 August 1947	27 May 1964^{[†]}	16 years 286 days	–	External and Commonwealth Affairs; Defence (1952–1955, 1957); Finance (1958)	Indian National Congress	Nehru I	King George VI (1947–1950)
	Jawaharlal Nehru (1889–1964) MP for United Provinces (1947–1952) and Phulpur	57 years 274 days	15 August 1947	27 May 1964^{[†]}	16 years 286 days	–	External and Commonwealth Affairs; Defence (1952–1955, 1957); Finance (1958)	Indian National Congress	Nehru I	Rajendra Prasad (1950–1962)
	Jawaharlal Nehru (1889–1964) MP for United Provinces (1947–1952) and Phulpur	57 years 274 days	15 August 1947	27 May 1964^{[†]}	16 years 286 days	1951–52	External and Commonwealth Affairs; Defence (1952–1955, 1957); Finance (1958)	Indian National Congress	Nehru II	Rajendra Prasad (1950–1962)
	Jawaharlal Nehru (1889–1964) MP for United Provinces (1947–1952) and Phulpur	57 years 274 days	15 August 1947	27 May 1964^{[†]}	16 years 286 days	1957	External and Commonwealth Affairs; Defence (1952–1955, 1957); Finance (1958)	Indian National Congress	Nehru III	Rajendra Prasad (1950–1962)
	Jawaharlal Nehru (1889–1964) MP for United Provinces (1947–1952) and Phulpur	57 years 274 days	15 August 1947	27 May 1964^{[†]}	16 years 286 days	1962	External and Commonwealth Affairs; Defence (1952–1955, 1957); Finance (1958)	Indian National Congress	Nehru IV	Sarvepalli Radhakrishnan (1962–1967)
	Gulzarilal Nanda (acting) (1898–1998) MP for Sabarkantha	65 years, 328 days	27 May 1964	9 June 1964^{[DIS]}	13 days	–	Home Affairs; External Affairs; Atomic Energy	Indian National Congress	Nanda I	Sarvepalli Radhakrishnan (1962–1967)
	Lal Bahadur Shastri (1904–1966) MP for Allahabad	59 years 251 days	9 June 1964	11 January 1966^{[†]}	1 year, 216 days	–	External Affairs (1964)	Indian National Congress	Shastri	Sarvepalli Radhakrishnan (1962–1967)
	Gulzarilal Nanda (acting) (1898–1998) MP for Sabarkantha	67 years, 191 days	11 January 1966	24 January 1966^{[DIS]}	13 days	–	Minister of Home Affairs; Minister of Atomic Energy	Indian National Congress	Nanda II	Sarvepalli Radhakrishnan (1962–1967)
	Indira Gandhi (1917–1984) MP for Uttar Pradesh (Rajya Sabha, 1966–1967) MP for Rae Bareli (1967–1977)	48 years, 66 days	24 January 1966	24 March 1977	11 years, 59 days	–	External Affairs (1967–1969); Finance (1970); Home Affairs (1970–1973); Information and Broadcasting (1971–1974); Defence (1975)	Indian National Congress	Indira I	Sarvepalli Radhakrishnan (1962–1967)
	Indira Gandhi (1917–1984) MP for Uttar Pradesh (Rajya Sabha, 1966–1967) MP for Rae Bareli (1967–1977)	48 years, 66 days	24 January 1966	24 March 1977	11 years, 59 days	1967	External Affairs (1967–1969); Finance (1970); Home Affairs (1970–1973); Information and Broadcasting (1971–1974); Defence (1975)	Indian National Congress	Indira II	Zakir Husain (1967–1969)
	Indira Gandhi (1917–1984) MP for Uttar Pradesh (Rajya Sabha, 1966–1967) MP for Rae Bareli (1967–1977)	48 years, 66 days	24 January 1966	24 March 1977	11 years, 59 days	1967	External Affairs (1967–1969); Finance (1970); Home Affairs (1970–1973); Information and Broadcasting (1971–1974); Defence (1975)	Indian National Congress	Indira II	V. V. Giri (1969) (acting)
	Indira Gandhi (1917–1984) MP for Uttar Pradesh (Rajya Sabha, 1966–1967) MP for Rae Bareli (1967–1977)	48 years, 66 days	24 January 1966	24 March 1977	11 years, 59 days	1967	External Affairs (1967–1969); Finance (1970); Home Affairs (1970–1973); Information and Broadcasting (1971–1974); Defence (1975)	Indian National Congress	Indira II	Mohammad Hidayatullah (1969) (acting)
	Indira Gandhi (1917–1984) MP for Uttar Pradesh (Rajya Sabha, 1966–1967) MP for Rae Bareli (1967–1977)	48 years, 66 days	24 January 1966	24 March 1977	11 years, 59 days	1967	External Affairs (1967–1969); Finance (1970); Home Affairs (1970–1973); Information and Broadcasting (1971–1974); Defence (1975)	Indian National Congress	Indira II	V. V. Giri (1969–1974)
	Indira Gandhi (1917–1984) MP for Uttar Pradesh (Rajya Sabha, 1966–1967) MP for Rae Bareli (1967–1977)	48 years, 66 days	24 January 1966	24 March 1977	11 years, 59 days	1971	External Affairs (1967–1969); Finance (1970); Home Affairs (1970–1973); Information and Broadcasting (1971–1974); Defence (1975)	Indian National Congress (R)	Indira III	V. V. Giri (1969–1974)
	Indira Gandhi (1917–1984) MP for Uttar Pradesh (Rajya Sabha, 1966–1967) MP for Rae Bareli (1967–1977)	48 years, 66 days	24 January 1966	24 March 1977	11 years, 59 days	1971	External Affairs (1967–1969); Finance (1970); Home Affairs (1970–1973); Information and Broadcasting (1971–1974); Defence (1975)	Indian National Congress (R)	Indira III	Fakhruddin Ali Ahmed (1974–1977)
	Indira Gandhi (1917–1984) MP for Uttar Pradesh (Rajya Sabha, 1966–1967) MP for Rae Bareli (1967–1977)	48 years, 66 days	24 January 1966	24 March 1977	11 years, 59 days	1971	External Affairs (1967–1969); Finance (1970); Home Affairs (1970–1973); Information and Broadcasting (1971–1974); Defence (1975)	Indian National Congress (R)	Indira III	B. D. Jatti (1977) (acting)
	Morarji Desai (1896–1995) MP for Surat	81 years, 24 days	24 March 1977	28 July 1979^{[RES]}	2 years, 126 days	1977	Finance (1977, 1979); Home Affairs (1978–1979)	Janata Party	Desai	B. D. Jatti (1977) (acting)
	Morarji Desai (1896–1995) MP for Surat	81 years, 24 days	24 March 1977	28 July 1979^{[RES]}	2 years, 126 days	1977	Finance (1977, 1979); Home Affairs (1978–1979)	Janata Party	Desai	Neelam Sanjiva Reddy (1977–1982)
	Charan Singh (1902–1987) MP for Baghpat	76 years, 217 days	28 July 1979	14 January 1980^{[RES]}	170 days	–	None	Janata Party (Secular)	Charan	Neelam Sanjiva Reddy (1977–1982)
	Indira Gandhi (1917–1984) MP for Medak	62 years, 56 days	14 January 1980^{[§]}	31 October 1984^{[†]}	4 years, 291 days	1980	Defence (1980–1982); External Affairs (1984)	Indian National Congress (I)	Indira IV	Neelam Sanjiva Reddy (1977–1982)
	Indira Gandhi (1917–1984) MP for Medak	62 years, 56 days	14 January 1980^{[§]}	31 October 1984^{[†]}	4 years, 291 days	1980	Defence (1980–1982); External Affairs (1984)	Indian National Congress (I)	Indira IV	Zail Singh (1982-1987)
	Rajiv Gandhi (1944–1991) MP for Amethi	40 years, 72 days	31 October 1984	2 December 1989	5 years, 32 days	–	External Affairs (1984–1985, 1987–1988); Tourism, Civil Aviation and Commerce (1984–1985); Environment and Forests (1984–1986); Defence (1985–1987); Finance (1987)	Indian National Congress (I)	Rajiv I	Zail Singh (1982-1987)
	Rajiv Gandhi (1944–1991) MP for Amethi	40 years, 72 days	31 October 1984	2 December 1989	5 years, 32 days	1984	External Affairs (1984–1985, 1987–1988); Tourism, Civil Aviation and Commerce (1984–1985); Environment and Forests (1984–1986); Defence (1985–1987); Finance (1987)	Indian National Congress (I)	Rajiv II	Ramaswamy Venkataraman (1987–1992)
	V. P. Singh (1931–2008) MP for Fatehpur	58 years, 160 days	2 December 1989	10 November 1990^{[NC]}	343 days	1989	Defence; Human Resource Development; External Affairs (1989)	Janata Dal	Vishwanath	Ramaswamy Venkataraman (1987–1992)
	Chandra Shekhar (1927–2007) MP for Ballia	63 years, 207 days	10 November 1990	21 June 1991^{[RES]}	223 days	–	External Affairs (1990)	Samajwadi Janata Party (Rashtriya)	Chandra Shekhar	Ramaswamy Venkataraman (1987–1992)
	P. V. Narasimha Rao (1921–2004) MP for Nandyal	69 years, 358 days	21 June 1991	16 May 1996	4 years, 330 days	1991	Chemicals and Fertilizers (1991–1994); External Affairs (1992–1993); Defence (1993–1996); Railways (1995–1996)	Indian National Congress (I)	Rao	Ramaswamy Venkataraman (1987–1992)
	P. V. Narasimha Rao (1921–2004) MP for Nandyal	69 years, 358 days	21 June 1991	16 May 1996	4 years, 330 days	1991	Chemicals and Fertilizers (1991–1994); External Affairs (1992–1993); Defence (1993–1996); Railways (1995–1996)	Indian National Congress (I)	Rao	Shankar Dayal Sharma (1992–1997)
	Atal Bihari Vajpayee (1924–2018) MP for Lucknow	71 years, 143 days	16 May 1996	1 June 1996^{[RES]}	16 days	1996	Chemicals and Fertilizers; Textiles; Commerce and Industry	Bharatiya Janata Party	Vajpayee I	Shankar Dayal Sharma (1992–1997)
	H. D. Deve Gowda (born 1933) MP for Karnataka (Rajya Sabha)	63 years, 14 days	1 June 1996	21 April 1997^{[RES]}	324 days	–	Home Affairs (1996); Agriculture (1996); Textiles (1996); Urban Development (1996–1997)	Janata Dal (United Front)	Deve Gowda	Shankar Dayal Sharma (1992–1997)
	Inder Kumar Gujral (1919–2012) MP for Bihar (Rajya Sabha)	77 years, 138 days	21 April 1997	19 March 1998^{[RES]}	332 days	–	Personnel, Public Grievances and Pensions; External Affairs; Finance (1997)	Janata Dal (United Front)	Gujral	Shankar Dayal Sharma (1992–1997)
	Inder Kumar Gujral (1919–2012) MP for Bihar (Rajya Sabha)	77 years, 138 days	21 April 1997	19 March 1998^{[RES]}	332 days	–	Personnel, Public Grievances and Pensions; External Affairs; Finance (1997)	Janata Dal (United Front)	Gujral	K. R. Narayanan (1997–2002)
	Atal Bihari Vajpayee (1924–2018) MP for Lucknow	73 years, 84 days	19 March 1998^{[§]}	22 May 2004	6 years, 64 days	1998	External Affairs (1998); Information and Broadcasting, Communications and Information Technology (1998); Non Conventional Energy Sources (1998–1999); Coal and Mines (2002); Environment and Forests (2003–2004)	Bharatiya Janata Party (National Democratic Alliance)	Vajpayee II	K. R. Narayanan (1997–2002)
	Atal Bihari Vajpayee (1924–2018) MP for Lucknow	73 years, 84 days	19 March 1998^{[§]}	22 May 2004	6 years, 64 days	1999	External Affairs (1998); Information and Broadcasting, Communications and Information Technology (1998); Non Conventional Energy Sources (1998–1999); Coal and Mines (2002); Environment and Forests (2003–2004)	Bharatiya Janata Party (National Democratic Alliance)	Vajpayee III	K. R. Narayanan (1997–2002)
	Atal Bihari Vajpayee (1924–2018) MP for Lucknow	73 years, 84 days	19 March 1998^{[§]}	22 May 2004	6 years, 64 days	1999	External Affairs (1998); Information and Broadcasting, Communications and Information Technology (1998); Non Conventional Energy Sources (1998–1999); Coal and Mines (2002); Environment and Forests (2003–2004)	Bharatiya Janata Party (National Democratic Alliance)	Vajpayee III	A. P. J. Abdul Kalam (2002–2007)
	Manmohan Singh (1932–2024) MP for Assam (Rajya Sabha)	71 years, 239 days	22 May 2004	26 May 2014	10 years, 4 days	2004	Personnel, Public Grievances and Pensions; Atomic Energy; Space; External Affairs (2005–2006); Finance (2008–2009, 2012); Culture (2009–2011)	Indian National Congress (United Progressive Alliance)	Manmohan I	A. P. J. Abdul Kalam (2002–2007)
	Manmohan Singh (1932–2024) MP for Assam (Rajya Sabha)	71 years, 239 days	22 May 2004	26 May 2014	10 years, 4 days	2004	Personnel, Public Grievances and Pensions; Atomic Energy; Space; External Affairs (2005–2006); Finance (2008–2009, 2012); Culture (2009–2011)	Indian National Congress (United Progressive Alliance)	Manmohan I	Pratibha Patil (2007–2012)
	Manmohan Singh (1932–2024) MP for Assam (Rajya Sabha)	71 years, 239 days	22 May 2004	26 May 2014	10 years, 4 days	2009	Personnel, Public Grievances and Pensions; Atomic Energy; Space; External Affairs (2005–2006); Finance (2008–2009, 2012); Culture (2009–2011)	Indian National Congress (United Progressive Alliance)	Manmohan II	Pratibha Patil (2007–2012)
	Manmohan Singh (1932–2024) MP for Assam (Rajya Sabha)	71 years, 239 days	22 May 2004	26 May 2014	10 years, 4 days	2009	Personnel, Public Grievances and Pensions; Atomic Energy; Space; External Affairs (2005–2006); Finance (2008–2009, 2012); Culture (2009–2011)	Indian National Congress (United Progressive Alliance)	Manmohan II	Pranab Mukherjee (2012–2017)
	Narendra Modi (born 1950) MP for Varanasi	63 years, 251 days	26 May 2014	Incumbent	12 years, 136 days	2014	Personnel, Public Grievances and Pensions; Atomic Energy; Space	Bharatiya Janata Party (National Democratic Alliance)	Modi I	Pranab Mukherjee (2012–2017)
	Narendra Modi (born 1950) MP for Varanasi	63 years, 251 days	26 May 2014	Incumbent	12 years, 136 days	2014	Personnel, Public Grievances and Pensions; Atomic Energy; Space	Bharatiya Janata Party (National Democratic Alliance)	Modi I	Ram Nath Kovind (2017–2022)
	Narendra Modi (born 1950) MP for Varanasi	63 years, 251 days	26 May 2014	Incumbent	12 years, 136 days	2019	Personnel, Public Grievances and Pensions; Atomic Energy; Space	Bharatiya Janata Party (National Democratic Alliance)	Modi II	Ram Nath Kovind (2017–2022)
	Narendra Modi (born 1950) MP for Varanasi	63 years, 251 days	26 May 2014	Incumbent	12 years, 136 days	2019	Personnel, Public Grievances and Pensions; Atomic Energy; Space	Bharatiya Janata Party (National Democratic Alliance)	Modi II	Droupadi Murmu (2022–present)
	Narendra Modi (born 1950) MP for Varanasi	63 years, 251 days	26 May 2014	Incumbent	12 years, 136 days	2024	Personnel, Public Grievances and Pensions; Atomic Energy; Space	Bharatiya Janata Party (National Democratic Alliance)	Modi III	Droupadi Murmu (2022–present)

== List of prime ministers by length of term ==
Name	Party	Length of term	
Name	Party	Longest continuous term	Total years of premiership
Jawaharlal Nehru	INC	16 years, 286 days	
Indira Gandhi	INC/INC(I)/INC(R)	11 years, 59 days	15 years, 350 days
Narendra Modi	BJP	12 years, 136 days	
Manmohan Singh	INC	10 years, 4 days	
Atal Bihari Vajpayee	BJP	6 years, 64 days	6 years, 80 days
Rajiv Gandhi	INC(I)	5 years, 32 days	
P. V. Narasimha Rao	INC(I)	4 years, 330 days	
Morarji Desai	JP	2 years, 126 days	
Lal Bahadur Shastri	INC	1 year, 216 days	
V. P. Singh	JD	343 days	
Inder Kumar Gujral	JD	332 days	
H. D. Deve Gowda	JD	324 days	
Chandra Shekhar	SJP(R)	223 days	
Charan Singh	JP(S)	170 days	
Gulzarilal Nanda (acting)	INC	13 days	26 days

Timeline

== List by party ==
Fraction of time of holding PMO by party (as of August 2026)
1. Indian National Congress (68.9%)
2. Bharatiya Janata Party (23.4%)
3. Janata Dal (3.46%)
4. Janata Party (2.96%)
5. Samajwadi Janata Party (Rashtriya) (0.77%)
6. Janata Party (Secular) (0.58%)

Political parties by total timespan of their member holding PMO (as of 9 October 2026)
No.	Political party	Number of Prime ministers	Total years of holding PMO
1	INC/INC(I)/INC(R)	7 (Note: Including Gulzarilal Nanda)	54 years, 166 days
2	BJP	2	18 years, 216 days
3	JD	3	2 years, 269 days
4	JP	1	2 years, 126 days
5	SJP(R)	1	223 days
6	JP(S)	1	170 days

=== Parties by total duration (in years) of holding Prime Minister's Office ===
- INC/INC(I)/INC(R)
- BJP
- JD
- JP
- SJP(R)
- JP(S)

== See also ==
- Nehru–Gandhi family
- Union Council of Ministers
- Prime minister of India
- President of India
- Vice President of India
- List of presidents of India
- List of vice presidents of India
- List of deputy prime ministers of India
- List of prime ministers of India by previous experience
- List of heads of state and government of Indian origin

== Footnotes ==
- ^{†} Assassinated or died in office
- ^{§} Returned to office after a previous non-consecutive term
- ^{RES} Resigned
- ^{NC} Resigned following a no-confidence motion
