= History of the Jews in Aruba =

The history of the Jews in Aruba can be traced back to the 16th century, when the first Jewish immigrants began to arrive. The first Jews in Aruba were Sephardi Jewish immigrants from Netherlands and Portugal. The first Jew to settle in Aruba was a Portuguese-Jewish worker for the Dutch West India Company named Moses Solomon Levie Maduro, who arrived in Aruba with his family in 1754.

After 1924, a number of Jewish immigrants came to Aruba from Eastern Europe, Surinam, and The Netherlands. In 1942, a Jewish center was opened and the Jewish community became officially organized four years later.

The Beth Israel Synagogue was consecrated on November 4, 1962, in Oranjestad. Beth Israel also shares their house of worship with the Jewish Community of Aruba (Israelitische Gemeente).

As of 2013, the Jewish population is around 85. Prime Minister Mike Eman is Jewish. Eman has interacted with Chabad visiting Rabbis as well as with Chabad's permanent rabbi on the island. His brother Henny Eman was the first Prime Minister of Aruba.

== See also ==
- World Jewish Congress
