= -elect =

Suffix describing elected yet uninstalled officials

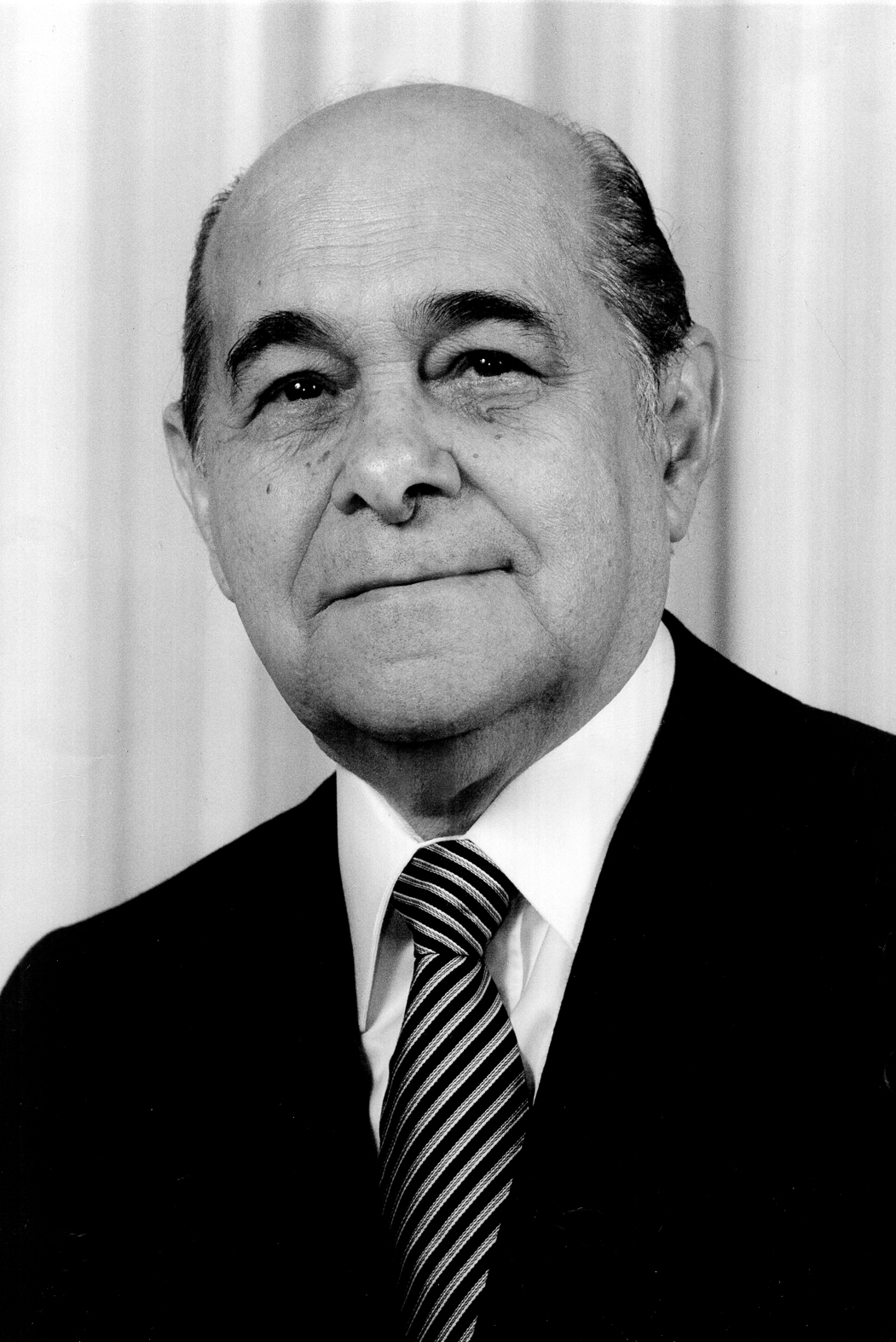
Tancredo Neves was one of the two presidents-elect of Brazil who died before taking office.

-elect is a suffix which describes the position of a person who has been elected but has not yet been installed. Notably, a president who has been elected but not yet installed would be referred to as the president-elect (e.g. president-elect of the United States). Analogously, the term -designate (e.g. prime minister–designate or justice-designate) is used for the same purpose, especially when someone is appointed rather than elected.

== History ==
This usage of the term -elect originated in the Catholic Church, where bishops were elected but would not take office until ordained. In addition, the winner of a papal election would be known as the pope-elect until he was confirmed and became pope. The term entered politics with the practice of elective monarchy. For example, the Holy Roman emperor was elected by a college of prince-electors, but the winning candidate would not become emperor until he was crowned by the pope. Between election and coronation, he was known as the imperator electus, or emperor-elect. By the 19th century, the term had expanded to describe any position in which a substantial period elapses between election and installation. For example, it was common in the 19th century to refer to a fiancée as a bride-elect.

== Official positions in organizations ==
The bylaws of some clubs and other organizations may define an official position of president-elect similar to a vice president position. The members of the organization elect the president-elect, rather than directly electing the organization's president. The president-elect may be given limited duties, similar to a vice president. At the end of the term, the president-elect is promoted to the position of president, and a new president-elect is elected. The advantage of this schema is a clear continuity of succession, as well as the opportunity to familiarize the president-elect with the operations of the organization before becoming president. A possible drawback is that once a president-elect has been elected, another person cannot be elected president unless the president-elect resigns or is removed from office.

The position of president-elect is different from someone who was elected president and is called "president-elect" between the time of election and the start of the term. For example, if an election for president was held in January, but the term of office does not begin until March, the person who was elected president may be called "president-elect" but does not hold any power until the term begins in March. On the other hand, someone in the position of president-elect has all the powers of that position that the bylaws provide. Similarly, organizations may have other official positions such as vice president–elect, secretary-treasurer-elect, director-elect, and chair-elect.
