= Poetri Hindia =

Magazine in the Dutch East Indies (1908–1912)

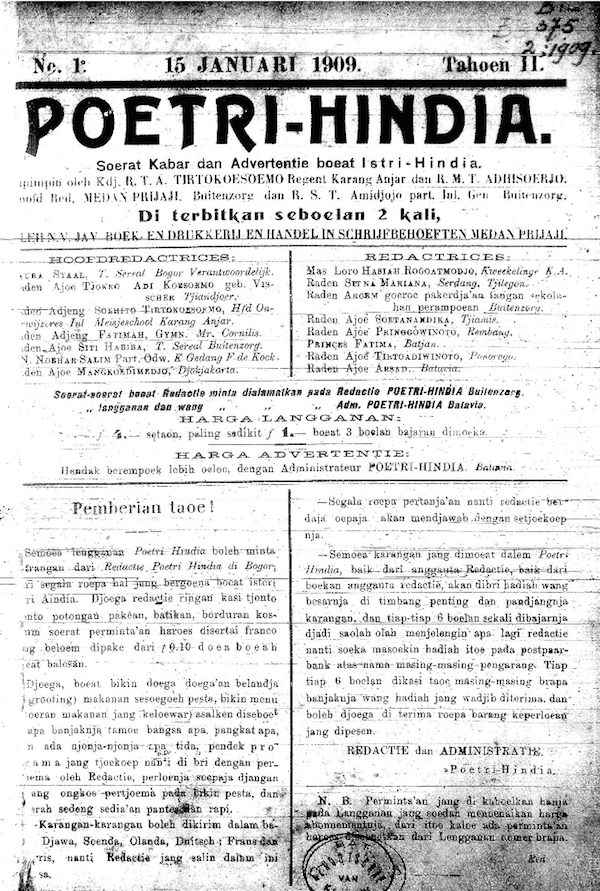
- Cover, 15 January 1909
- First issue: July 1908; 118 years ago
- Final issue: 1912; 114 years ago
- Country: Dutch East Indies
- Based in: Buitenzorg, West Java (editorial); Batavia (administrative)
- Language: Malay

Poetri Hindia (Enhanced Spelling: Putri Hindia, lit. 'daughter of the Indies') was a vernacular Malay-language women's magazine published in the Dutch East Indies (now Indonesia) between 1908 and 1912. Established by the journalist Tirto Adhi Soerjo with the support of the nationalist movement Budi Utomo, Poetri Hindia was written and edited primarily by women. Its readership and editors were spread throughout the archipelago, as well as in British Malaya, with most being members of the middle and upper classes. Contents varied, and included short stories, entertainment news, beauty tips, and family advice, as well as discussion of women's issues and domestic skills. Poetri Hindia was the first Malay-language magazine dedicated to women established by indigenous journalists in the Dutch East Indies.

== History ==
Poetri Hindia was established by the journalist Tirto Adhi Soerjo in conjunction with Budi Utomo leader R. T. A. Tirtokoesomo and R. S. T. Amidjojo. Tirto had written about the need for a women's press in the Dutch East Indies since 1903, with his article "Kemadjoean Perempoean Boemipoetra" ("The Advancement of Indigenous Women") in Pembrita Betawi highlighting the contributions of women such as Kartini and Lasminingrat to the burgeoning women's movement while decrying the lack of a dedicated forum.

In 1907, Tirto established the newspapers Medan Prijaji (Forum for Noblemen) and Soeloeh Keadilan (Torch of Justice), both of which saw positive subscriber response. These were thus followed in 1908 by Poetri Hindia, with its first edition published on 1 July. The magazine's editorial office was located in Buitenzorg (now Bogor), while its administrative offices were in Batavia (now Jakarta); printing was handled by Jav Boek, which was also responsible for Medan Prijaji. Unlike Tirto's earlier establishments, Poetri Hindia—billed as "a paper of news and advertisements for the wives of the Indies" (Note: Original: "... soerat kabar dan advertentie boeat istri Hindia" (Mahayana 2003, p. 50).)—was explicitly targeted at women readers. Tirto later recalled that he had difficulty finding women contributors, having to solicit contributions from women whom he had heard were skilled writers and including respondents as members of the editorial team.

In 1909, to commemorate the birth of Princess Juliana, Poetri Hindia assembled an annotated album of subscribers and presented it as tribute. Later that year, the magazine received a gift from Emma, the Queen Mother and former Queen of the Netherlands, to support its activities, citing the magazine's contributions to the development of indigenous women. The magazine announced its intention to use the gift to establish a library. To expand its reach, in mid-1909 Poetri Hindia requested that the colonial government include copies in school libraries. Though this was not granted, at several points the publication received support from the colonial authorities.

In 1911, Poetri Hindia established a free school in West Java to teach batik-making and cooking. Later that year, Poetri Hindia began to experience financial difficulties. It was closed in 1912, the same year that Tirto was imprisoned by the colonial regime after incurring significant debts. Previously, he had been sentenced to exile on several occasions due to his writings in Medan Prijaji.

Poetri Hindia has been identified as the first Malay-language women's magazine established by indigenous journalists in the Indies. (Note: The Dutch-language weekly Insulinde had been established in 1878 (Mahayana 2003, p. 50). Meanwhile, earlier Malay-language newspapers—including Tirto's own Soenda Berita (Sunda News)—had offered space for women readers and writers, but were not explicitly targeted at them (Mahayana 2003, pp. 48–49). A dedicated women's magazine, Tiong Hoa Wi Sien Po (The Reformist Chinese Journal), had been established for the Chinese community by Lim Titie Nio in 1906 (Salmon 1977, p. 160).) It was followed by numerous women's magazines, including Wanita Swara (Women's Voice) and Soenting Melajoe (Malay Headdress) in 1912 and Panoentoen Istri (Guide for Wives) in 1918. Several editions of Poetri Hindia are likely lost. A study by the Indonesian press studies scholar Maman S. Mahayana was unable to locate any editions published before 15 January 1909, the earliest date committed to microfilm at the National Library of Indonesia.

== Contributors and readers ==
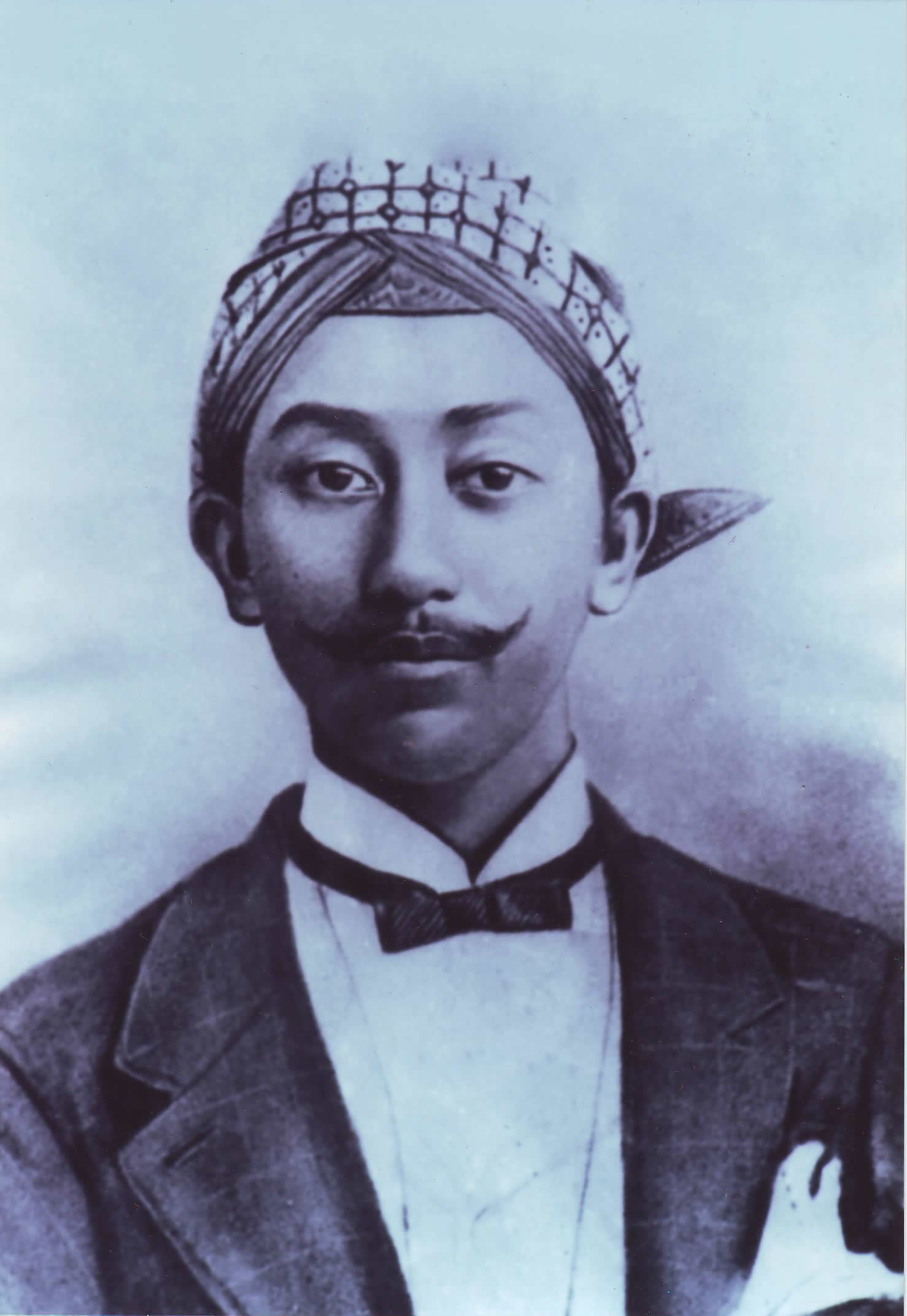
Tirto Adhi Soerjo, the founder of Poetri Hindia

Beginning with its first issue, which identified seven editors-in-chief and nine editors, Poetri Hindia was produced and edited primarily by women throughout Java and Sumatra. These women were mostly of European, Eurasian, or indigenous heritage, and came from diverse backgrounds; editors included teachers, members of the nobility, and family members of political leaders. Most were of high social status, and had received an education at schools run by the Dutch colonial government. Editors included Laura Elmensdrop Staal of Buitenzorg, S. N. Norhar Salim of Fort de Kock (now Bukittinggi), Raden Ayu Mangkoedimedjo of Yogyakarta, and Tirto's first wife Raden Ayu Siti Habiba.

Readers of Poetri Hindia were predominantly from the upper and middle classes, and included the wives of regents (bupati) and sultans, as well as colonial officials and members of the Chinese community. Letters to the editor indicate that they were spread throughout the archipelago, including Java and Sumatra as well as Sulawesi, the Maluku Islands, and Borneo. Readership was also found in British Malaya (now Malaysia), including Malacca and Johor. Readers were invited to submit their contributions to the magazine. These submissions were not required to be in Malay; according to magazine policy, submissions in Javanese, Sundanese, Dutch, German, French, and English would be considered, with translation into Malay handled by the editorial team.

== Contents and description ==
Poetri Hindia was published twice a month, with subscriptions priced at 1.25 gulden per three months or 5 gulden per year. Issues averaged ten to fifteen pages in length, with covers on yellow paper and pages on white paper. Content varied, and included short stories, entertainment news, beauty tips, and family advice; the first issue, for example, included articles on batik in Yogyakarta, puddings, and knitting. As the magazine was open to reader submissions, several articles responded to earlier contribution, creating a dialogue and allowing an exchange of ideas. Articles were written in vernacular Malay, the lingua franca of the Indies.

Generally, Poetri Hindia urged women readers not to restrict themselves to harmful adat (customary practices). One article, written by M. Wirjo Wijhto of Sumenep, urged women to be willing to challenge husbands when they make mistakes and to recognize their equal standing, while another by Red S.M. and Sitisundari highlighted the dichotomy between women's marginalized place in society and their important role in raising future generations. A 1909 article in the Zutphensche Courant thus credited Poetri Hindia for providing the first impetus for women's emancipation in the Dutch East Indies. At the same time, a January 1909 article identified housekeeping, saving money, cooking, and raising children as skills useful for women, and multiple articles focused on the practical application of domestic skills.

Some articles in Poetri Hindia discussed women's experiences in the Indies, as well as topics related to women's lives in the colony, including the establishment of new schools and a Budi Utomo congress on women's issues. One article explored a women's school that had been established by a Japanese conglomerate, concluding with the question of when a corporation in the Indies would take similar steps to promote women's development. A column provided readers with an introduction to the Dutch language, which was framed as the language of science.

== Works cited ==
- Adam, Ahmat (2018). The Vernacular Press and the Emergence of Modern Indonesian Consciousness. Ithaca, New York: Cornell University Press. ISBN 978-1-5017-1903-5.
- "Batik en Kookschool" [Batik and Cooking School]. De Preanger-bode (in Dutch). Bandung. 10 January 1911. p. 2.
- "Dankbaarheid voor een Vorstelijke Gift" [Gratitude for a Royal Gift]. De Nieuwe Courant (in Dutch). The Hague. 19 January 1910. p. 1.
- "De Poetri Hindia" [The Poetri Hindia]. Het Vaderland (in Dutch). The Hague. 29 November 1909. p. 12.
- "De Poetri Hindia, Het Tijdschrift voor Inlandsche Vrouwen in Nederlandsch-Indië" [The Poetri Hindia, A Magazine for Indigenous Women in the Netherlands Indies]. De Nieuwe Courant (in Dutch). Semarang. 12 August 1909. p. 5.
- "Een Oostersche Hulde aan Prinses Juliana" [An Oriental Tribute to Princess Juliana]. De Nieuwe Courant (in Dutch). The Hague. 13 July 1909. p. 6.
- "Indische Causerie" [Indies in Conversation]. Zutphensche Courant (in Dutch). Nijmegen. 4 August 1909. p. 3.
- Mahayana, Maman S. (2003). "Majalah Wanita Awal Abad ke-20: Corong Ide Emansipasi" [Early 20th-Century Women's Magazines: Spreading Idea of Emancipation]. Wacana (in Indonesian). 5 (1): 48–69. doi:10.17510/wjhi.v5i1.319.
- Nuryanti, Reni (2008). "Poetri Hindia: Perintis Pers Perempuan" [Poetri Hindia: Pioneer of the Women's Press]. In Setyowati, Hajar Nur (ed.). Seabad Pers Perempuan: Bahasa Ibu, Bahasa Bangsa [A Century of Women's Press: Mother Tongue, National Language] (in Indonesian). Yogyakarta: I:boekoe. pp. 33–37. ISBN 978-979-1436-08-3.
- "Nieuwe Geluiden" [A New Sound]. De Preanger-bode (in Dutch). Bandung. 15 July 1908. p. 2.
- "Queen Emma (1858-1934)". Royal House of the Netherlands. Archived from the original on 8 May 2026.
- Septiani, Ayu (2017). "Implementasi Nilai-Nilai Perjuangan Kaum Perempuan dalam Surat Kabar Poetri Hindia 1908–1911" [Implementation of the Values of Women's Struggles in the Newspaper Poetri Hindia, 1908–1911]. Candrasangkala. 3 (1): 43–52. doi:10.30870/candrasangkala.v3i1.2887.
- Sinarizqi, Bidari Aufa; Ningsih, Widya Lestari (6 April 2022). "Kisah Surat Kabar Poetri Hindia dalam Memajukan Perempuan" [Story of the Newspaper Poetri Hindia and Its Advancement of Women]. Kompas (in Indonesian). Archived from the original on 18 July 2026.
- Salmon, Claudine (1977). "Presse Féminine ou Féministe?" [Feminine or Feminist Press?]. Archipel (in French). 13: 157–192. doi:10.3406/arch.1977.1334.
