= Joesoef Isak =

Indonesian publisher and activist (1928–2009)

Joesoef Isak (15 July 1928 – 15 August 2009) was an Indonesian publisher, translator, and left-wing intellectual. He was an advocate of free speech during President Suharto's authoritarian New Order administration, and was imprisoned from 1967 to 1977 without trial. In 1980, he helped found and direct the publishing house Hasta Mitra, publisher of Pramoedya A. Toer's Buru quartet.

== Biography ==
Isak was born in Petojo, Jakarta, on 15 July 1928. His father was a post-office employee who came from the Minangkabau region of West Sumatra.

Educated in the Dutch colonial system, Isak did not speak Indonesian as a young man.

In 2005, Isak was the inaugural recipient of the Australian PEN Keneally Award for his work.

Isak died on 15 August 2009 at the age of 81. He is buried at Jeruk Purut Cemetery in South Jakarta.
