= House of Glass (Toer novel) =

1988 novel by Pramoedya Ananta Toer

House of Glass (Rumah Kaca) is the fourth and final novel in the Buru Quartet tetralogy by the Indonesian author Pramoedya Ananta Toer. The original Indonesian edition was published in 1988 and an English translation by Max Lane was published in 1997.

The Buru Quartet follows the life of Minke, a heroic character loosely based upon pioneering journalist Tirto Adhi Soerjo. Unlike the other novels, House of Glass is not narrated by Minke. Instead, it follows the perspective of his nemesis, a self-loathing colonial official who is trying to destroy the emergent Indonesian independence movement.

== Synopsis ==
The novel begins with Minke going into exile for five years as a punishment for criticising the government in his newspaper. He is accompanied by Meneer (Jacques) Pangemanann, whom the Dutch colonial authorities then task to spy upon the dissident movement.

Pangemanann is a Menadonese man holding a legal status equal to that of a European. He enjoys the status and power of his colonial position, and orders his thugs and informers to attack the dissidents by spreading divisive rumours, inciting race riots, and committing torture and murder. Yet Pangemanann also recognises the rottenness of the colonial administration, and knows that his attempts to suppress the dissidents will be ultimately futile. He privately sympathises with the independence movement, and is tormented by pangs of conscience.

Despite Pangemanann's inner turmoil and his secret admiration for Minke, he nonetheless engineers the journalist's destruction. Visiting Minke's grave, he mourns over his rival.

== Reception ==
John Morley stated that the novel provides "an illuminating, moving account of colonial psychosis", through its exploration of how Pangemanann "succumbs to the lures of power and privilege at the cost of betraying his people and, in the end, himself".
