= Child of All Nations =

Novel by Pramoedya Ananta Toer

- Book cover
- Author: Pramoedya Ananta Toer
- Original title: Anak Semua Bangsa
- Translator: Maxwell Lane (English)
- Language: Indonesian trans. to English
- Series: Buru Quartet
- Genre: Historical novel
- Publisher: Penguin
- Publication date: 1980
- Publication place: Indonesia
- English publication date: 1991
- Pages: 352
- ISBN: 978-0-14-025633-8
- OCLC: 35667972
- Preceded by: This Earth of Mankind
- Followed by: Footsteps

Child of All Nations is the second book in Pramoedya Ananta Toer's epic quartet called Buru Quartet, first published by Hasta Mitra in 1980. Child of All Nations continues the story of the lives of the main character, Minke, and his mother in law, Nyai Ontosoroh. By describing the lives of these two people who live in the Dutch controlled islands of Java, Pramoedya is able to discuss many aspects of life in a colonized nation. Child of All Nations explores the social hierarchy in a colonized nation by giving glimpses of how the oppressed colonized peoples, such as the Javanese farmers, are required to be submissive to their occupiers, the Dutch. That wealthy, educated Javanese like Minke and Nyai were still considered inferior to the Dutch due to their Native birth status and frequently simply the color of their skin. The main theme of the novel is, as the title suggests, that the world is becoming more integrated as revealed in the life of the main character Minke, the self-proclaimed "child of all nations" ^{1}. Minke speaks French, Dutch, Malay, and both high and low Javanese. He writes for a newspaper published in Dutch and has to come to terms with being a 'native' in a European controlled world. His worldview is jaded by the fact that he is wealthy and educated, and therefore closer to the Dutch than other Javanese; however, Minke comes to realize the ethical implications of the injustices being done to his people. His life is caught between two worlds, which the novel follows as he tries to understand who he really is, his role in the Dutch-occupied society, and his duty to his people.

== Plot summary ==
The story continues where This Earth of Mankind leaves off, shortly after Annelies has departed by ship to the Netherlands with Panji Darman secretly in tow. Having promised to watch over Annelies, Panji discovers her room on the ship, only to be recruited by the ship's crew in taking care of the severely ailing young woman. Panji continues to accompany her after arriving in the Netherlands where she dies after rapidly deteriorating. He relays this information back to Nyai and Minke through multiple letters.

From this point, Minke attempts to continue on with his life by writing for Maarten Nijman and the Soerabaiaasch Nieuws, however he is challenged by his good friend Jean Marais, as well as Kommer later on, to write in Javanese or Malay. They argue that in doing so, he would be helping his people in their struggle to overcome the oppression laid down by the Dutch occupying their nation. At first, Minke refuses on the grounds that it would tarnish his rising, reputable position in his influential field. His opinion quickly changes after recording an interview between Nijman and a member of the Chinese Young Generation, Khouw Ah Soe. After being a part of the unique experience, Minke feels quite proud, as well as curious of Soe's position and beliefs. Soon after, he discovers the article he wrote was completely ignored, only to be replaced by Nijman's self-report of Soe being a Chinese radical, opposing old Chinese traditions, and generally being a trouble-maker. Minke feels hurt from the encounter, and decides to take Kommer up on his offer to visit the Sidoarjo region and discover who his people really are.

== Character list ==
- Minke – Main protagonist of the novel

Minke is Javanese, and one of the few natives with a formal education—even more uncommon, a Dutch education. He is first introduced as a widower, mourning the suspicious death of his beautiful Indo-Dutch wife, Annelies. At first Minke is naive, unpatriotic, and even arrogant in regards to his own people. He is also an aspiring writer who works for a Dutch newspaper. However, after his boss alters his writing to condemn a Chinese activist (Toer 74-75), Minke begins to understand the corruption and power of the Dutch colonists. Urged by his mother-in law, his friend Jean, and another writer named Kommer, Minke sets out on a journey to understand his own nation, and reveal the truth about the oppression of his people.

- Nyai Ontosoroh – Mother-in-law of Minke, Annelies’ mother, and business owner

Nyai (usually referred to as "Mama" by Minke) is very perceptive, hard-working, and resolute. She was sold to a Dutch man as a concubine when she was younger, but persevered and now runs a successful business. She has strong opinions concerning the Dutch and the colonization of the Indies. Though she is Minke's mother-in-law, she treats him more like her own son. Throughout the novel she can be seen lecturing Minke on different subjects, especially when it comes to the Dutch colonists and how the Native people are being treated. She tries to show him a perspective he would not have known in his Dutch schooling. Despite her strength, the death of her daughter and departure of her disgraced son Robert have left her feeling lonely and dependent on Minke as her only remaining family. Throughout the book she worries of losing her business, and more importantly, losing Minke. Nyai has perhaps more influence on Minke than any other character. Not only does she continuously give him advice and her opinions, but she is also a living example of the oppression of the Javanese.

- Jean Marais – Friend of Minke and Nyai, works as a painter, Frenchman

Minke is close friends with Jean, and Jean’s daughter. He confronts Minke about possibly writing in Malay to increase the newspaper’s Asian readership, but is met with Minke’s defenses, resulting in tension in their relationship.

- Kommer - Friend of Jean Marais, a Dutch-Indonesian Mixed-blood Journalist.

Kommer is a strongly opinionated journalist who holds a passion for the Native people of Java. He sides with Jean Marais and attempts to get Minke to write in Malay or Javanese. He presents Minke with a number of credible newspapers that are writing in those local languages. Kommer then accuses Minke of being ignorant and out of touch with his own people. After more discussion, he persuades Minke to explore other parts of Java and observe the Native People. Kommer is also described to be very fond of Nyai. Ontosoroh.

- Darsam - Protector of the Mellema (Nyai's) estate

Darsam is a native man who watches over the Mellema estate to protect it from intruders. He watches over Nyai’s business why she is away on leave to Sidoarja, her home town, with Minke. While he is temporary head of the company, he engages in a chase with an intruder, Babah Kong, and has his arm shot. After this happens he is not able to move several fingers.

- Panji Darman – Informant, formerly known by the alias Robert Jan Dapperste

Native child adopted by the preacher Dapperste, but changes his name after being the 'object of insults'. Changes from being a shy introvert into a happy courageous individual who becomes the governor-general of the Netherland Indies. Is hired by Nyai Ontosoroh to escort Annelies on her journey to the Netherlands. Keeps in close contact with Minke and Mama throughout the voyage by sending letters describing every detail of the trip back to Surabaya.

- Khouw Ah Soe - Young Chinese activist

Khouw Ah Soe comes to the Indies in order to promote the recent radical thoughts that are spreading through China; he seeks to educate people in the thought that the older generation needs to periodically be taken out of power so that the younger generation may begin to run the governments and societies around the world so progress by countries and peoples is made. Minke writes a newspaper article about Khouw Ah Soe for the paper, but it is changed and published under his name at the last minute. Khouw Ah Soe seeks refuge with Minke and Nyai under Darsam’s care for a little while until he decides that he must continue traveling. Later Minke and Nyai find out that Khouw Ah Soe was killed for his activism and his radicalism. Nyai even commented on Khouw that he was "no doubt a wise young man."

- Trunodongso – Javanese peasant farmer

Refuses to give up his land to the sugar companies and, as a result, gets threatened, ridiculed, and insulted by mill workers everyday to rent out his land. He is threatened that if he does not allow the sugar companies to use the land, then the road to his home and the water channels for his paddy fields will be closed off, forcing him to close his paddy fields. He has 5 children: 2 boys and 3 girls. As Minke’s first focus on the writer’s journey to learn about the natives, he finds trust in Minke and eventually ‘surrenders’ his family’s lives into Minke’s hands.

- Annelies - Minke's dead wife

Although Annelies has already died by the second chapter, she is often mentioned throughout the story. Annelies was Nyai's daughter and Minke's wife before she was taken by a Dutch officer named Maurits. Maurtis is related to Nyai Ontosoroh because his father bought Nyai to be his wife. Maurits orders Annelies to be shipped out to Holland, but she dies soon after being taken.

- Maurits - Man who took Annelies away from Minke

Maurtis is the man who ordered Annelies to come with him to Holland. As her half-brother, following the death of their father he is given control over her because of her young age. Her mother, as a native and a nyai, has no rights over her in the Dutch courts. He does not make an appearance till later in the book but he comes to Surabaya to collect his inheritance rights to Annelies's property and business.

- Surati - Daughter of Sastro Kassier

The young, pockmarked daughter of Sastro Kassier. She is originally introduced as Nyai Ontosoroh hoped Minke would take her as his second wife. She was once beautiful, but lost her beauty to smallpox. She was to become the concubine of Plikemboh. Her father was tricked into selling his daughter as the only way to maintain his position as paymaster. Surati refuses to become nothing more than a nyai, and resolves to kill herself by infecting herself with smallpox. She runs to a nearby village that has recently been hit by the disease, and stays in a house with two corpses and a dying baby. She becomes infected, and goes to Plikemboh to offer herself, hoping that he would contract the disease as well. Not long after, Plikemboh dies, but Surati is found and cured. Her beauty was taken away, but she remains humble, and doesn't seem to mind.

- Sastro Kassier - Nyai's eldest brother

Sastro came from being a clerk to an apprentice cashier and then full paymaster of the sugar factory. Sastro is put into a difficult situation when the money used to pay the workers is stolen. The only person that can help Sastro in this predicament is Tuan Besar Kuasa who is the Dutch manager who wants to take Sastro's daughter as his concubine. His daughter does not want this man because he is a drunkard and terrible man.

- Frits Homerus Vlekkenbaaij - Tuan Besar Kuasa of the sugar mill

Frits Homerus Vlekkenbaaij, known by the title Tuan Besar Kuasa and the nickname Plikemboh, is the manager of the sugar mill Sastro works as paymaster for. He desires Sastro's daughter and so hatches a scheme which results in Sastro agreeing to giving Plikemboh his daughter. Plikemboh dies of smallpox, which Surati conspired to catch and give to him.

- Maysoroh – Adolescent daughter of Jean Marais

Maintains a strong bond between Minke and her father Jean when relations are harsh.

- Minem - Mother of Robert Mellema's son, Rono Mellema

Minem used to work with the cows, but upon Robert Mellema’s request, Nyai took her into her home. She eventually leaves her son with Nyai to live with Accountant de Visch.

- Ter Haar - former subeditor at the Soerabaiaasch Nieuws, European

Ter Haar is a tall, slim European who Minke becomes acquainted with on the ship Oosthoek. He was on the same ship to go to work for De Locomotief, a famous newspaper. Ter Haar constantly bombards Minke with very liberal ideas that shakes and shatters Minke’s perspective of the capital driven sugar plantation that feeds the inexhaustible greed of the imperialistic governments. A member of the Vrizinnige Democraat party (a radical party), he discloses insider information and conspiracies about the dirty, dark inner-workings of the power hungry world of politics and money. However, Minke feels ignorant and overloaded with so many complex ideas, Ter Haar enlightens Minke of how the real world works; driven by capital and greed. Ter Haar uses the Philippines as an example that resistance was possible. Even though Ter Haar only appears briefly in the novel, he makes a significant impact on Minke’s intellectual growth and outlook on reality.

Minke’s meeting with Ter Haar can be seen as a marker to Minke’s loss of faith in European ideals and morals. Nijman, the editor of Soerabaiaasch Nieuws was in some ways a representative of Europe and its grandeur to Minke. Minke idolized and revered Nijman until he found out he was just a media puppet of the sugar plantations. Ter Haar quit working for Soerabaiaasch Nieuws because of different beliefs, mainly since he was an extreme liberal and Nijman the editor of an extremist colonial paper. It’s only natural that these two characters, both disappointed by Nijman, meets by chance and discusses complex subjects that takes Minke completely by surprise.

Ter Haar: "Yes, others call this sort of view ‘extreme liberal.’ Not just disliking being oppressed, but also disliking oppressing. And, indeed, more than that: disliking oppression anywhere." (Toer 267)

== Major events ==
=== Minke's interview with Trunodongso ===
One major book changing event is Minke's interview and brief stay with Trunodongso. Trunodongso is a poor sugar cane farmer and he explains his grievances to Minke and expresses how natives all over the country are being taken advantage of. This helps Minke realize that his own people are being slaved and mistreated every day. Minke than realizes that it is up to him to help his native people, so his whole perspective on his life changes. He begins to acknowledge that he has the education and wealth to do good to his country. He begins to know it is up to him to help these people and use his writings in a different way. Rather than just write about European topics, he will focus on the well-being of his people in his country. This tiny stay with this peasant farmers family shapes Minke into a new driven individual. It forces him to leave Surabaya and continue his education with one main focus, his people. "Good-bye to you all. I will never return to see any of you again. I am on my way to become my own person, to become what I was meant to be. Good bye. ( Child of all Nations, p. 249)" This however would not be true, he would be taken back to Surabaya only a few days later for yet another trial.

=== Surati and Tuan Besar Kuasa ===
Chapter 7 effectively illustrates the different kinds of power relationships within the novel. The unfortunate story of Surati, Sastro Kassier's daughter provides a microcosm of the situation for not only Javanese women but the native people in general. Frits Homerus Vlekkenbaaij, addressed as Tuan Besar Kuasa and nicknamed "Plikemboh" by the mixed-blood employees, orders Sastro to give him Surati so she can become his mistress. The only reason he wants to have her is because she is a beautiful virgin. The very idea that he wants to "have" her shows the position of women in this society as women are objectified throughout the entire novel. Their opinion is not valued, as demonstrated by Sastro's response to his wife's protests, telling her, "What does a woman know? Your world is no more than a tamarind seed." Even if Surati had refused to go to Tuan Besar Kuasa, she knew it would make no difference. She was to be obedient to her father. However, she does take matters into her own hands as she contracts smallpox for the expressed purposed of infecting Tuan Besar Kuasa, trying to kill herself and him. However, only Tuan Besar Kuasa dies. But Surati's story does not only show the plight of native women, but also of natives as a whole, as Tuan Besar Kuasa takes advantage of his position over Sastro Kassier. Kuasa steals money from Sastro's cashbox at work and then threatens to ruin him if he cannot produce the money. However, he says he will pay the debt in exchange for Surati. It is understood that, "in a case like this where two people are accused, one a Pure-blood manager…and the other is a Native, the Native is in the wrong place and the Pure is in the right." Clearly, the people's status as Natives defines their role in society, and as such some were forced to yield to the wishes of those in authority over them, whether that person be their father or their manager.

=== Minke attempts to leave ===
A few months after Minke's return from Sidoarjo, a wounded Trunodongso unexpectedly shows up at Nyai Ontosoroh's house. Nyai and Minke decide to hide Trunodongso in the company warehouse. While Nyai and Dr. Martinet tend to Trunodongso's wounds, Minke hires a carriage and picks up the rest of the family. At this point, Nyai and Minke finally agree that the best thing for Minke to do is leave Surabaya. He leaves the next morning and meets a very enthusiastic young Dutchman by the name of Ter Haar on the boat. Before catching up with him the next morning, however, Minke is stopped by a policeman and escorted back to Nyai Ontosoroh's. At first, Minke is afraid that Trunodongso has been caught and told the police their story. His fears are dispelled when he finds out that Nyai was the one who brought him back. However, Minke's initial fears show how afraid he was of being caught speaking out against the Dutch and their management of the sugar industry.

=== Minke's interview with Khouw Ah Soe ===
Another major event that occurs in Chapter three of the text is Minke's interview with the young Chinese activist, Khouw Ah Soe. Upon arrival to the interview, Minke was very disappointed to learn that his interviewee turned out to be a poor youth who gave the impression of originating from the village. Despite this drawback, Khouw Ah Soe provided the initial steps to Minke's recognition of the exploitation occurring in his country. Khouw Ah Soe expresses his emotions of rebellion against the Chinese emperor and states that as a result of the collapsing of China, he is attempting to rapidly increase the collapse in order to successfully free their country from oppression (Toer 68). After reading the article in the newspaper the following day, Minke finds his words were altered into lies. He knew the superiority of Europeans to the natives existed, although upon reading the article Minke begins to question the appropriateness of their tactics. It is through the actions of Soe, which displayed no inferiority, as well as the words of freedom from oppression that contributed to Minke's understanding of the exploitation of his country under Dutch oppression.

=== Minke's point of realization ===
One major event in the book was when Minke came to realize that he did not know and had been neglecting his own people, when he was the one, with greater education, who could be the Natives’ voice in a society in which the Dutch oppressed the Natives. "Loyalty to one’s own country and people," was not an important concern to Minke in the beginning. Kommer and Jean Marais’ consistent claim that Minke did not know his own people shows the issue of identity in this novel. Living in a society in which everything Dutch-related was more powerful and seen as superior, Minke, having greater education, disregarded his fellow Natives in the hopes to pursue something greater. It is important to the development of the story because after speaking with Kommer and Jean Marais, Minke came to acknowledge and realize that he truly did not know his own people and this realization changed his course in life. It was then that he decided to be a voice for his people by writing for them in newspaper articles. It is also important in trying to understand an Indonesian's perspective of life under Dutch colonial rule, because this event shows how the Indonesians are an oppressed people with no way to fight back against the Dutch, and the greatest weapon that they have would be the writings of an educated Native.

== Recurring themes ==
- Nationalism - Throughout the novel, Minke comes to the political realization that his country is being exploited by the Dutch. Contributing factors to this awakening include: his meeting with Khouw Ah Soe (a young Chineseman who journeys to promote pride in China to Chinese who have moved away from the country.) who furthers his understanding of the Chinese nationalist struggle, and especially his personal experiences with the effects of sugar farming and the exploitation of his people. The awakening of the sense of nationalism is also impacted by his talk with Kommer and Jean Marais on the train ride. This awakening drives to him to be the voice for his people in acting against Dutch exploitation.
- Women's rights - In the novel, we see both sides of women's rights: the empowered, independent women, and the oppressed, ill-treated women. After her father's death, Annelies is taken from her family due to her lack of rights in the Netherlands. Also we see Surati daughter of Sastro Kassier have to be Tuan Besar Kuasa's concubine against her will. Nyai on the other hand, is a wise and insightful woman and runs her business with minimal help from Minke. Throughout the novel, women are shown to be competent, intelligent, and fully capable. Unfortunately these women are objectified and are seen as nothing but playthings for many men in the story. This treatment of women was regarded as normal, although there were still outcries of unfairness and disgust.
- Family - The strength and love of family are apparent throughout the novel; Particularly in the beginning as Minke and Nyai become closer with the death of Annelies. During the rest of the novel, Nyai constantly supports Minke's actions and mentors Minke on life lessons. Due to imperialism that forced the country to poor social security and government support, the values of family are emphasized during this time period of Indonesia. In the various aspects of life, family places a great importance throughout this novel. Nyai treats Minke as her own child, and she sees him more of her son than she sees Robert. Nyai tries her best to bring the most out of Minke by teaching him and lecturing him. She says to Minke, "'Child, you are all I have left in the world now. I am alone in the world now,'" and she knows how empty it is to feel without Minke around her. Nyai understands that if Minke leaves her, she will have no one else to live for.
- Pure and mixed bloods - Within the novel, direct references of an individual's race/ethnicity was referenced for determining their social standing in the Dutch East Indies. The constant direct examples of calling someone "pure blood", "mixed blood", or "native" shows the reader the establishment of a caste system in the Dutch East Indies. The "pure bloods" and "mixed blood" individuals were seen as higher in the social rankings than the "natives." A specific example of this would be a scene in which a robbery (staged or not staged is questionable) takes place and those accused came from differing social rankings. It is directly stated that between the accusation of a Pure-Blood manager and a native, regardless of the truth, " ...where two people are accused... the Native is in the wrong place and the Pure is in the right," meaning that the ones that win situations such as this one would most likely be a pure blood, seeing that they are superior (Toer 143). There are various other references throughout the novel of this separation of classes and is a helpful tool to see the culture that is trying to be expressed of the time period.
- Anti-colonialist - Child of All Nations takes a particularly anti-colonialist tone throughout the novel but particularly around the time of Minke's realization that he and his people have long been oppressed and he can do something about it. The author, Toer, makes a point to have the readers understand that there is no question the natives are oppressed and the Dutch are the oppressors. This is seen repeatedly in the simple fact that no matter what situation or level of ability the natives will always be subject to the Dutch, simply because they Dutch have stated it to be so. The anti-colonial tone, which the book takes, is not surprising when the author himself was imprisoned for subversive activities from a regime supported by former colonial powers.
- Duality - Duality is a constant theme in the novel, including the conflict between the Dutch and Natives, the poor and the rich, knowing Dutch versus knowing only Malay, and religion. The problem between the Dutch and the Natives is made very apparent in the beginning of the novel when the Natives protested against the departure of Annelies with great sadness and compassion. Many Natives were jailed for many months for their protests, though they were not violent. The evidence of the poor and the rich is seen mostly in the lifestyles and clothing of the people, often with people not wearing shoes and with one set of clothes, like Khouw Ah Soe, or with the complete opposite, having very fancy, well-made clothes. The educational system that the Dutch brought into Southeast Asia also created a large faction between those who could afford education, or were privileged enough to receive it, and those who could not. Those without a Dutch education could only speak Malay disabling them from reading many newspapers or working in higher positions. This created tension between Minke and his friend Jean Marais, who asked Minke to write his articles in Malay to allow Natives to be involved with the politics and events.
- Shoes - In the novel, many people are judged by what they wear on their feet as a symbol of someone's social status. At one point, it is said that, "These simple people equated shoes with the power of Europe, of the same essence as the army's rifles and cannons. They were more afraid of shoes than daggers or machetes, swords or spears."(Pramoedya, 237) It is evident that peasants often are barefoot, and only those with wealth have the luxury of wearing shoes. Even so, Minke is surprised by the intelligence of those who do not wear shoes, such as his Chinese friend Khouw Ah Soe.

== International influences ==
- China - A key influence in Minke's development comes from his observation of the struggles of the "Chinese Young Generation" (Toer, 55-56). Minke recounts an article written by Maarten Nijman detailing how Japan exploits China. This, in juxtaposition with a letter from Herbert de la Croix causes Minke to examine the parallels between Japan-China's relationship and that of the Dutch-Native Indonesians. "They are jealous! And furious and angry because they are aware but powerless" (Toer, 56). This passage is key in summarizing not only the plight of the young generation of Chinese, but also natives like Minke, who are caught in between the lives they have led and the idea of "what if". It is interesting that later in the novel, even a native (Darsam) is blatantly racist towards the Chinese population in the Indies while his race is downtrodden by the Pure Bloods. In this conversation Nyai is the voice of logic pointing out the physical differences do not denote any real difference in character (Toer, 212). This reflects that Nyai is open-minded, which is intrinsic in Minke's development as a character.
- Japan - Early in the novel, Minke speaks of Japan as "Amazing Japan!" (Toer, 48) He admires the Japanese for achieving the same status as Europeans in the Indies, referring to them in Chapter 3 as "a single grain of sand of the great sand-mountains of Asian people." (Toer, 48) From a historical context, we know this change in Japanese society as the Meiji Restoration. This was a period during which Japan saw huge changes in economic, social, and political structure. The Japanese people went out to almost every known country, and brought back new technologies and ideas, all of which were adopted and sequentially modernized the country. Minke sees this in many places; most significantly as relayed by Khouw Ah Soe. The fact that an Asian people are being treated as equals to the Europeans amazes him, and he initially feels a sense of pride and wonder shared by many Asians of the same era. Yet his admiration of Japan is often juxtaposed with the acknowledgment that Japan's glory emanated from overrunning China, just as the Dutch overran the Indies. He notes "how strange it was if every glory was obtained only at the cost of the suffering of others," and is conflicted as to whether or not he should admire or detest Japan for essentially becoming another colonizing nation. His feelings towards Japan are an early indicator for the eventual development of his own national pride.
- Philippines - Another influence comes from Khouw Ah Soe's discussion with Minke about Spanish and American activities in the Philippines. Despite its close distance, Minke had previously learned nothing of import about the colonization of the Philippines, and Khouw takes this opportunity to explain how that country is similar, and yet distinctly different from China and Japan. In Chapter 4, Khouw states that Filipinos have learned better from Western society than their Asian counterparts, but because they were colonized, they never had a chance to develop based on that knowledge. He also made it clear that there was much to be learned in Asian countries from the Filipino experience. Possibly of greater importance is the revelation of the real motives behind the Spanish–American War (at least in the Pacific theatre), which was meant to be a clear message to Minke regarding the lack of values of the Western conquerors. Ter Haar also expanded on what Khouw Ah Soe discussed about the Philippines. He explained the path the Filipinos took and used it as an example and a possible goal for Minke and the Dutch Indies. Ter Haar even compared Jose Rizal to Minke, "Somebody educated, a doctor, a poet…rebelling…"

== Book ban ==
Pramoedya Ananta Toer's imprisonment came under the New Order regime of Suharto in 1973. Confined in a prison on the island of Buru he was forbidden to write. Without even a pencil at his disposal, Pramoedya managed to orally compose a series of four historical-fiction novels called the Buru Quartet. This series includes: This Earth of Mankind, Child of All Nations, Footsteps, and House of Glass. With the help of fellow inmates, Pramoedya managed to write the novels down. He was released from prison in 1979 and was placed under house arrest until 1992. Toer utilized his time wisely and published nearly all of his works. In 1981, he published his first book of the Buru Quartet, This Earth of Mankind. Two days before its release the Attorney General claimed that the book "contains a veiled Marxist theory" and tried unsuccessfully to have it banned. Eventually Pramoedya's second story of the Buru Quartet, Child of All Nations was able to be published. Around mid April, several New Order youth organizations were formed to criticize the material in the novel. These organizations were given media attention and soon enough the Attorney General intervened. On May 29, 1981 he instituted ban SK-052/JA/5/1981which deems possession or distribution of This Earth of Mankind and Child of All Nations illegal in Indonesia. Representatives of the Attorney General went around confiscating what books they could find. These attempts were very unsuccessful only resulting in 972 being returned of the near 20,000 in circulation. The ban was in place until the fall of Suharto's regime in 1998 and Pramoedya's writings became available once again in Indonesia.

== Author biography ==
- Pramoedya Ananta Toer (1925–2006) was an Indonesian critic, essayist, short-story writer, and novelist. Most of his writing is about Indonesia's struggle for Independence. His first major work was "Kranji-Bekasi Jatuh" in 1947.
- Pramoedya was born in Blora, East Java. His father was the headmaster of the nationalistic school but ruined his family by his obsession with gambling. Pramoedya moved to Surabaya and graduated from the Radio Vocational School in 1941. He worked as a stenographer during the Japanese Occupation. He lived in Jakarta, which is where he continued his studies, and worked for "Domei"- a Japanese news agency.
- Pramoedya joined the Indonesian armed forces in East Jakarta when the revolution broke out. That is when he moved back to Kakarta and edited a journal called "Sadar."
- Between 1947 and 1949 he was imprisoned by the Dutch for being 'anti-colonial.' While in prison he read works by John Steinbeck and William Saroyan. These books, and others, are what led him to write some of his most famous novels.
- In the 1950s Pramoedya moved to the left side of the political spectrum and abandoned fiction for critical essays and historical studies. He moved to the Netherlands and in 1958 was appointed a member of Lekra’s Plenum, the Institute of People’s Culture. This was an organization championing the nationalist ideals of the 1945 revolution. In 1960 he was imprisoned once again for defending the country’s persecuted ethnic Chinese.
- In 1965, during events that led to the establishment of "New Order" Indonesia, Pramoedya was once again imprisoned, this time without trial by the military regime. When he was arrested he was severely beaten and suffered hearing loss, which was then an obstacle for the rest of his life.
- To date, Pramoedya has had his works translated into 41 different languages, including English. He has also translated English books to Indonesian, as well as Russian novels and a Chinese play.
- Pramoedya finally had the chance to visit the United States in 1999. He described the chance to visit as "a personal victory against decades of oppression and against the arrogance of the formal authorities in Indonesia".
- Pramoedya was hospitalized in Jakarta on April 27, 2006, for complications brought on by diabetes and heart disease. Pramoedya was also known to be a heavy smoker of clove cigarettes and had encountered years of abuse. He died on April 30, 2006, at the age of 81.
- Pramoedya's name has been discussed for the Nobel Prize for Literature multiple times. No Southeast Asian has yet been awarded this Nobel Prize.
- Pramoedya was imprisoned by the Indonesian government in 1965 and was imprisoned for 14 years. His imprisonment took the form of a work camp for political prisoners and during his stay was not allowed any writing materials. Regardless, Pramoedya composed many fictional pieces and composed, House of Glass orally and, with the help of other prisoners, had them learn this story by heart.
