= It's Not an All Night Fair =

Indonesian novel by Pramoedya Ananta Toer (1951)

Bukan Pasar Malam (English title: It's Not an All Night Fair) is an Indonesian novel that published in 1951 by Balai Pustaka. This novel was written by Pramoedya Ananta Toer, the author of This Earth of Mankind. This novel has been published in six languages.
