= The Chinese in Indonesia =

1960 book by Pramoedya Anata Toer

- Author: Pramoedya Ananta Toer
- Original title: Hoakiau di Indonesia
- Genre: Non-fiction
- Publisher: Bintang Press
- Publication date: 1960

The Chinese in Indonesia (Indonesian: Hoakiau di Indonesia) is an Indonesian-language book by Pramoedya Ananta Toer published in 1960 by Bintang Press. In the book, Toer (who was Javanese) criticized discriminatory policies imposed on Chinese Indonesians. The book is based on a series of articles published on the front page of Bintang Timur. The English translation was published by Select Press in 2007.

Toer, a humanist, engaged in political defiance and wrote essays addressing the importance of ethnic Chinese publishers in the promotion of the Malay language (at the time it was spoken of a very small minority of the Indonesian population) throughout the Dutch East Indies. Later he also spoke against the use of Javanese soldiers to "subdue the regions outside of Java".

Pram endured the Japanese Occupation and was detained by the Indonesian Army during the Sukarno presidency for a year in the early 1960s because of the book and its support for ethnic Chinese and advocacy against their persecution. After the military coup of October 1965, his library was burned, his house was confiscated, and he was beaten. He was then imprisoned for 14 years, mostly on the remote island of Buru. The book was republished in Indonesia in 1998 after the fall of the Suharto.

== Background ==
The book was released in the wake of soft-authoritarian rule through Guided Democracy in Indonesia and restrictions on alien residence and trade. These regulations culminated in the enactment of Presidential Regulation 10 in November 1959, banning retail services by non-indigenous persons in rural areas. Ethnic Chinese, Arab, and Dutch businessmen were specifically targeted during its enforcement to provide a more favorable market for indigenous businesses. This move was met with protests from the Chinese government and some circles of Indonesian society. There were also challenges to the citizenship of ethnic Chinese in Indonesia.

Integrationist movements led by the Chinese-Indonesian political party Baperki (Badan Permusjawaratan Kewarganegaraan Indonesia) developed but were met with a series of attacks on ethnic Chinese communities in West Java in May 1963. After a failed coup attempt the groups were branded a communist in 1965 and attacked.

Toer's main character "Minke" in the Buru Quartet married an Indonesian of Chinese descent. In 1960 Toer said the Indonesian Chinese "are not voyagers from abroad landed on our shores. They have been here as long as our own ancestors. They are, in fact, Indonesians, who live and die in Indonesia also, but because of a certain political veiling, suddenly become strangers who are not foreign."
