= Lipek Pageh =

Coordinates: 1°02′14″S 100°48′01″E

Lipek Pageh is a village in West Sumatra. It is located near Alahan Panjang in Solok regency. The village is surrounded by mountains to the north, east and south of the village, and a river to the west. There are rice fields, tomato fields, potato fields, onion fields and so on. Lake Atas is nearby. The village income is made by selling onion, chili, potato, leek and carrot. Fruit such as bananas, avocado and oranges are also available. The vast majority of people living here are farmers who use this as a source of income.
