= Soenting Melajoe =

Newspaper published in Padang, Dutch East Indies

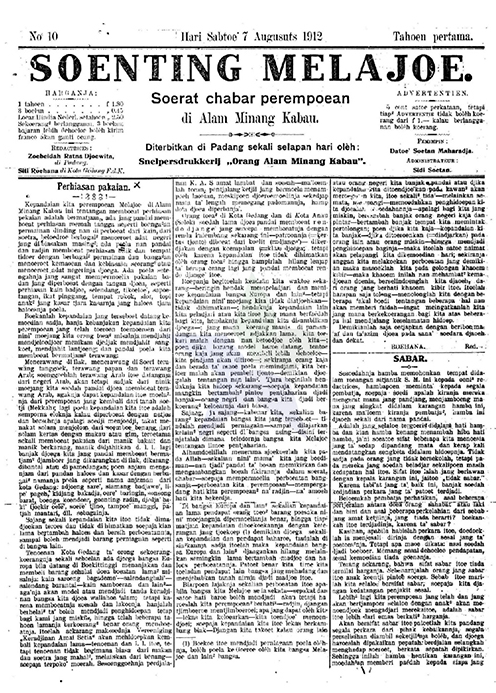
Front page of Soenting Melajoe from a 1912 issue

Soenting Melajoe (EYD: Sunting Melayu) was a Malay language newspaper published in Padang, Sumatra's Westkust Regency, Dutch East Indies from 1912 to 1921. Its full title was Soenting Melajoe: soerat chabar perempoean di Alam Minang Kabau (Malay Sunting (Note: Sunting refers to a type of floral or golden headdress worn in Sumatra, but is also a Malay word for editing or correcting a manuscript.): Newspaper for women in the Minangkabau land). It was edited by Ruhana Kuddus, an early women's education activist, and was the first newspaper for women published in West Sumatra.

== History ==
The newspaper was launched on July 10, 1912, by Mahyuddin Datuk Sutan Maharadja, a Minangkabau intellectual and editor of the newspaper Oetoesan Melajoe who thought that there should be a reformist newspaper aimed at a female audience in Padang. At that point there had only been a handful of Indies newspapers edited by Indonesians and aimed at a female audience, such as Lim Titie Nio's Tiong Hoa Wi Sien Po launched in 1906, or Tirto Adhi Soerjo's Poetri Hindia, launched in 1908; both papers were from Buitenzorg, Java. Maharadja had already heard about the educational activities of Ruhana Kuddus, who ran a successful and modern school for girls in Koto Gadang (near Bukittinggi), and when she corresponded with him he agreed to create the newspaper with her as the editor-in-chief. (According to some accounts, it was Maharadja who had first contacted her.) In this editorial role she was assisted by Soetan Maharadja's daughter Zoebaidah Ratna Djoewita; the two of them would remain co-editors for the following decade, although Ruhana was more prominent. When launching the paper, Ruhana stated that it would aim to improve the education level of Indonesian women, especially as few of them could read Dutch and relatively few modern educational materials were available in the Malay language.

During its nine-year run, the newspaper discussed the social issues of the day, including traditionalism, polygamy, divorce, and girls' education. It was fairly unique in its time in that most of its contributors were women; it created a fairly open and honest forum to discuss the issues they faced. Many of the contributors were wives of government officials or aristocrats. Eventually the continued publication of the newspaper inspired the creation of more educational societies like the one Ruhana had created in 1911, and students from those more remote schools and clubs became the younger generation of contributors of poetry and letters to the newspaper. Over time its readership also expanded beyond West Sumatra to Bandung, Medan, Bengkulu and other parts of the Indies. Because this, they hired some of their contributors from other cities as editors-at-large, including Sitti Noermah from Padang and Amna bint Abdul Karim from Bengkulu in 1917, and Sitti Djatiah Pasar Djohar from Kayu Tanam in 1919.

Despite its decade of popularity, Soenting Melajoe encountered difficulties in 1921 due to being tied to the support of Soetan Maharadja and his other newspaper Oetoesan Melajoe. In January 1921 Roehana left as editor and Soetan Maharadja appointed his daughter Retna Tenoen as the new editor. However, both Oetoesan Melajoe and Soenting Melajoe ceased publication in January 1921.
