= Medan Prijaji =

Newspaper in the Dutch East Indies

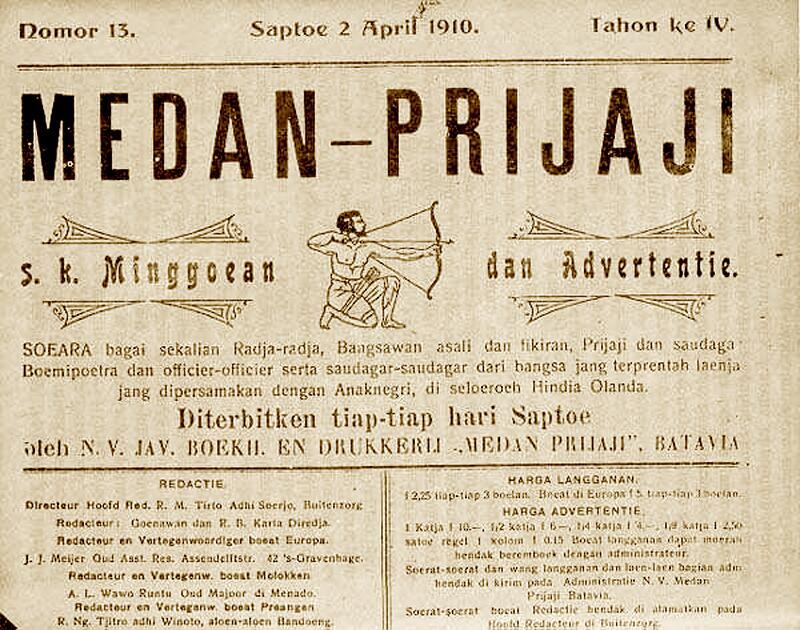
Front page of Medan Prijaji, 2 April 1910

Medan Prijaji (Malay: Aristocrat's Forum, in modern Indonesian spelling Medan Priyayi) was a Malay-language newspaper in the Dutch East Indies founded and operated in Bandung by Tirto Adhi Soerjo between 1907 and 1912. Although it was short-lived, it was considered the first newspaper of the Indonesian National Awakening and inspired the creation of a number of other anti-colonial Malay newspapers. Tirto Adhi Soerjo's life was the basis for the Buru Quartet series of historical novels by Pramoedya Ananta Toer.

The name of the paper implies that Tirto Adhi Soerjo intended it as a discussion forum for the priyayi, the Javanese lower aristocracy who were at this time participating in the Dutch civil service and obtaining European educations because of the Dutch Ethical Policy. His healthy subscription numbers pushed him to get additional investment in 1908 by wealthy priyayi and Indonesian Chinese backers.

As historian Takashi Shiraishi puts it,

Tirto Adhi Soerjo created his own journalist style in Medan Prijaji, militant and sarcastic in tone [...] it was no longer the forum for only the prijaji, but as its motto says, "the voice for all the (native) rulers, aristocrats, and intellectuals, priyayi, native merchants, and officers as well as merchants of the subordinated peoples made equal (in status) with the Sons of the Country."
