= This Earth of Mankind =

Novel by Pramoedya Ananta Toer

- Book cover
- Author: Pramoedya Ananta Toer
- Original title: Bumi Manusia
- Translator: Maxwell Ronald Lane (English)
- Language: Indonesian trans. to English
- Series: Buru Quartet
- Genre: Historical novel
- Publisher: Hasta Mitra
- Publication date: 1980
- Publication place: Indonesia
- Followed by: Child of All Nations

This Earth of Mankind is the first installment in Pramoedya Ananta Toer's epic quartet referred to as the Buru Quartet. First published by Hasta Mitra in 1980, the story is set at the tail end of Dutch colonial rule in Indonesia and was written whilst Pramoedya was imprisoned on the island prison of Buru. Because he was barred from writing for the duration of his stay in prison, the narrative was first relayed orally in 1973 to other prisoners, and proved popular among them. In 1975, Pramoedya was finally able to write the story.

The first-person narrator of the novel is a Javanese boy, Minke, loosely inspired by the journalist Tirto Adhi Soerjo, who, because of his royal heritage, is fortunate enough to attend an elite Dutch school. Minke encounters Nyai Ontosoroh, a njai or concubine of a Dutch man; and, dangerously, falls in love with Annelies, the beautiful Indo daughter of the character Nyai Ontosoroh. Life in Indonesia during Dutch colonization, and the injustices faced by the people therein, are portrayed recalcitrantly and in vivid detail. Minke is characterized as active and outspoken, discontented with the inequities of hierarchical society, and resists through his writing. Minke's life story as its portrayed in the novel bears resemblance to Pramoedya's own, who, prior to his becoming an author, was jailed by the Dutch government for two years.

In 1981, the Indonesian Attorney General banned the novel. Many of the first editions have survived and were circulated, along with editions published in Malaysia. In 2005, it was legally reprinted in Indonesia by the publisher Lentera Depantara, after already having been translated into 33 languages and distributed worldwide.

== Plot ==
The book tells the story of Minke, a Javanese minor royal who studies at a Hogere Burger School (HBS) in an era when only the descendants of the European colonizers can expect to attain this level of education. Minke is a talented young writer whose works are published in several Dutch-language journals and are widely admired. But as a "native", Minke is disliked by many of his fellow-students, who all claim some European descent. He is portrayed as being bold in opposing the injustices imposed upon his fellow Javanese as well as challenging aspects of his own culture.

Minke is introduced to an extremely unusual Indonesian woman, Nyai Ontosoroh, who is the concubine of a Dutch man called Herman Mellema. Though she is a concubine, Nyai Ontosoroh is the actual head of family and company as Herman Mellema lost his sanity in the past. Minke falls in love with their daughter, Annelies, whom he eventually marries in an Islamic wedding in accordance with "native" customs, but which, according to Dutch law, has no legal validity because it was conducted without the consent of the under-aged Annelies' legal, Dutch, guardians.

In that period, it was common for women to become the concubines of Dutch men living in the East Indies. They were considered to have low morals because of their status as concubines, even if, as in Nyai Ontosoro's case, they had no choice in the matter. Their children had uncertain legal status – either considered illegitimate "natives" with a corresponding lack of legal rights, unless legally acknowledged by their father, in which case they were considered "Indos", and their mother lost all rights over them in favor of the father. As a concubine, Nyai Ontosoro suffers because of her low status and lack of rights, but, significantly, is aware of the injustice of her suffering and believes education is the route by which her basic humanity can be acknowledged. She believes that learning is the key to opposing indignity, stupidity, and poverty. However, the decision to have the children of their relationship legally acknowledged as Herman Mellema's children has catastrophic consequences by the end of the book.

For Pramoedya, education is the key to changing one's fate. For instance, Nyai Ontosoro, who had no formal schooling and who was educated by her experiences, from books, and from her daily life, was a far more inspiring educator than Minke's high school teachers. However, the book also powerfully portrays the reality of Dutch colonial government in Indonesia through the lives of the characters, where Minke's education and Nyai Ontosoro's success in business count for little when ranged against the unyielding Dutch colonial law.

== Published by ex-political prisoners ==
After release from detention in April 1980, Hasjim Rachman, the former editor of the Eastern Star and Pramoedya met with Joesoef Isak, a former journalist of the Merdeka newspaper who had been detained in Salemba prison. After various discussion, an agreement was reached to publish works by ex-political prisoners that had not previously been welcomed by other publishers.

The manuscript chosen as the first work to be published was This Earth of Mankind (Bumi Manusia). Pramoedya began working hard to sort through the papers that he had managed to retrieve from the island of Buru. Nearly all the original manuscript had been detained by the prison officials and had not been returned. For three months he re-composed and sorted through the stained and weather-worn pages to create the manuscript for the book. In the meantime, Hasjim and Joesoef made the rounds of key government officials, including the Vice-President, Adam Malik, who were positively disposed towards the enterprise.

In July 1980, the manuscript of This Earth of Mankind was sent to the Aga Press printers with the hope that it would be published before the celebrations for the Indonesian Declaration of Independence on 17 August, although in the end it was published on 25 August, having been delayed by the celebrations. This first edition was very simple, with no illustrations. For Pramoedya, the publishing of This Earth of Mankind signified his "determination, sincerity, and resolution to invest in the development of democracy in Indonesia – and not a democracy built upon colonialism, but a democracy that is the result of our own efforts".

5,000 copies of This Earth of Mankind sold in the space of 12 days. Within a few months of being published, several publishers in Hong Kong, Malaysia, the Netherlands, and Australia approached the publishers, Hasta Mitra, for permission to prepare translations. Pramoedya as the author would receive royalties on these translations, while the role of Hasta Mitra was only to act as agents. The Wira Karya publishing house in Malaysia paid royalties of as much as 12% directly to Pramoedya.

By November, Hasta Mitra had published its third edition, and had sold as many as 10,000 copies. The book was well-received critically, acclaimed as "the best work of literature of our times", while the Armed Forces daily newspaper, published by the headquarters of the Indonesian Armed Forces called it "a new contribution to the treasury of Indonesian literature".

== Banned ==
This Earth of Mankind was banned by the Attorney General of Indonesia in 1981 on the grounds that it promoted Marxist-Leninist doctrines and Communism, even though neither doctrine is mentioned in the book.

Initially, the Ampat Lima printing house, which actually printed This Earth of Mankind, were asked not to produce any more works published by Hasta Mitra. The editors of major media organizations were contacted, to the effect that they were not allowed to review or praise This Earth of Mankind or any other of Pramoedya's works.

In April 1981, various New Order youth groups held discussion sessions which criticized the work of Pramoedya. These discussions were trumpeted by the mass media as evidence of the disapproval of 'the people'. Subsequently, these discussions provided an important justification for the eventual banning of the work by the Attorney General. New Order mouthpieces such as Suara Karya, Pelita and Karya Dharma began publishing criticisms of This Earth of Mankind and its author.

The Association of Indonesian Publishers (IKAPI), which were organizing an exhibition of the books of that year, suddenly sent a letter to the address of Hasta Mitra, revoking Hasta Mitra's membership in the association, despite the fact that the committee had been enthusiastic about inviting the publisher to become a member and be involved in its activities. Newspapers which had previously been sympathetic became increasingly reluctant to give space to the author, and there were even several pieces of writing, ready to be published, which were suddenly rejected just because their authors had praised the work of Pramoedya.

Finally, on 29 May 1981, the Attorney General published regulation SK-052/JA/5/1981 about the banning of This Earth of Mankind and its sequel Child of All Nations (Anak Semua Bangsa). In the regulation, among other things, were mentioned a letter from Suharto which had been written a week previously, and a meeting with the Minister of the Interior on 18 May 1981. The banning of the book was entirely political and had nothing to do with the books' literary qualities, scholarly arguments nor the official reason that the books were pro-communist.

All bookshops and agents were visited by people from the Attorney General's office and all copies of This Earth of Mankind and Child of All Nations were confiscated. In fact, several of them took the initiative and voluntarily surrendered copies of the books. However, by August 1981, only 972 copies of the books had been confiscated from the close to 20,000 copies in circulation.

In September 1981, the translator of This Earth of Mankind into English, Maxwell Ronald Lane, a staff member of the Australian Embassy in Jakarta, was recalled home by the Australian Government. The Ampat Lima company, which had originally printed the two novels also ceased trading because of pressure from the Attorney General's office and the Interior Ministry.

== Publication in other languages ==
- Bumi Manusia, Hasta Mitra, 1980 (Jakarta, Indonesian)
- Aarde Der Mensen, Manus Amici, 1981 (Amsterdam, Dutch)
- Ren Shi Jian, Beijing Da Xue, 1982 (Beijing, Chinese)
- Ren Shi Jian, Dou Shi Chu Ban Selangor, 1983 (Malaysia, Chinese)
- Bumi Manusia, Wira Karya, 1983, (Kuala Lumpur, Malaysian)
- This Earth of Mankind, Penguin Book, 1983 (Australia, English)
- Garten der Menschheit, Express Editio, 1984 (Berlin, German)
- Im Garten der Menschheit, Albert Klutsch-Verlags-Vertrag, 1984 (German)
- Människans Jord, Förlaget Hjulet, 1986 (Stockholm, Swedish)
- Ningen No Daichi, Shinkuwara Mekong Published, 1986 (Japanese)
- Мир человеческий, Radooga Moskwa 1986 (Russian)
- Світ людський, In Ukrainian, 1986 (Ukrainian)
- Garten der Menschheit, Rowohlt Taschenbuch Verlag, 1987 (German)
- Aarde der mensen, Unieboek, 1987 (Amsterdam, Dutch)
- Ang Daigdig ng Tao, Solidaridad Publishing House, 1989 (Manila, Filipino)
- Questa Terra Dell'Uomo, Il Saggiatore, 1990 (Milan, Italy)
- Minke, O Neul Publishing, 1990 (Korean)
- This Earth of Mankind, Penguin Book, 1990 (New York, English)
- This Earth of Mankind, William Morrow & Co., Inc, 1991 (New York, English)
- Människans Jord, Norstedts Förlag AB, 1992 (Stockholm, Swedish)
- Tierra Humana, Txalaparta, 1995 (Navarre, Spanish)
- Erbe Einer Versunkenen Welt, Verlag Volt und Welt, 1996 (German)
- Aarde der mensen, Uitgeverij De Geus, 1999 (Breda)
- This Earth of Mankind, Penguin Book, 2000 (Italy)
- Le Monde des Hommes, Payot & Rivages, 2001 (Paris, French)
- Menneskenes Jord, Pax Forlag A/S, 2001 (Oslo, Norwegian)
- Tiera Humana, Edisiones Destino, S.A., 2001 (Barcelona, Spanish)
- This Earth of Mankind, Bertrand Editorial, 2002 (Portuguese)
- This Earth of Mankind, Leopard Förlag, 2002 (Swedish)
- Bumi Manusia, Radio 68H, 2002 (Radio Broadcast, Indonesian)
- Esta estranha terra, Livros Quetzal, 2003 (Portuguese)
- Människornas Jord, Leopard Förlag, 2003 (Stockholm, Swedish)
- Matica života, Alfa-Narodna Knjiga, 2003 (Serbian)
- แผ่นดินของชีวิต, Kobfai Publishing, 2003 (Thai)
- Bumi Manusia, Lentera Dipantara, 2005 (Indonesian)
- دھرتی کا دکھ, Mas'ud Ash'ar, 2009 (Lahore, Urdu)
- 'Manushya Bhoomi' tr.by S.A.Qudsi,(Malayalam-Indian)- Chintha Pub-2011

== Media depiction ==
This Earth of Mankind has also been made into an Indonesian language film. On 3 September 2004, Hatoek Soebroto, an Indonesian film producer, along with the Elang Perkasa Corporation signed a contract for the production of the film with the Pramoedya's family's agents. The Elang Perkasa Corporation worked together with Citra Sinema to produce the film.

The search for locations began at the end of 2005. At the beginning of 2006, production began with Armantono as scriptwriter. The adaptation film of this novel, the film This Earth of Mankind was screened in Indonesian cinemas in August 2019.
