= Mahyuddin Datuk Sutan Maharadja =

Dutch East Indies Minangkabau intellectual and journalist

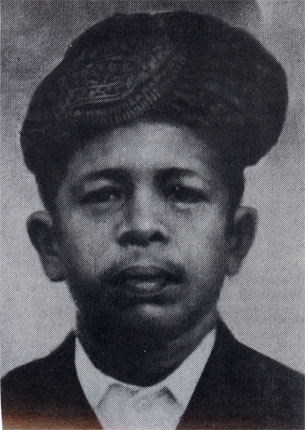
Mahyuddin Datuk Sutan Maharaja, date unknown (19th. century)

Mahyuddin Datuk Sutan Maharadja (c. 1860 – 1921, Van Ophuijsen Spelling System: Mahjoeddin Datoek Soetan Maharadja, Minangkabau: Mahyuddin Datuak Sutan Marajo) was a Minangkabau journalist, intellectual, activist and newspaper editor active in the Dutch East Indies. He is considered to be one of the fathers of modern Indonesian journalism and was a key figure in West Sumatran politics from the 1890s to 1921.

== Biography ==
=== Early life ===
Mahyuddin was born into an aristocratic Minangkabau family in Sulit Air, Solok Regency, West Sumatra, Dutch East Indies (now Indonesia) in around 1860. (Various sources gives his birth year as 27 November in either 1858, 1860, or 1862.) His grandfather had fought in the Padri War against the Padri side and eventually their family came to be incorporated into the Dutch political system as they conquered Sumatra. His father, Datuk Bandharo, was a Dutch-appointed leader in Sulit Air. His personal name was Mahyuddin (or Mahjoeddin in the spelling of the time) but tradition dictated that, as a Penghulu (hereditary leader) he was referred to by his full title Mahyuddin Datuk Sutan Maharadja. Due to his family's closeness with the Dutch, he was one of the first Minangkabau to receive a Western education, and in 1873 was sent to study in a European school in Padang, West Sumatra. However, Mahyuddin and the few other native students were involved in a fight with a Dutch student and were expelled before graduating. After that, through his father's connection he was sent to be the assistant of a public prosecutor (Malay: Jaksa) in Padang. While working there he studied law.

=== Career ===
In 1879 he became a salaried clerk in the public prosecutor's office and in 1882 was promoted to be a deputy public prosecutor (Dutch: adjunct-djaksa) in Indrapura, a town south of Padang. While living there, he was greatly influenced by Sufism and began to participate in their lodges. He was promoted again in 1883 and sent to work in Padang. After, in 1888 he was finally promoted to full Jaksa status and was sent to work in Pariaman. In the late 1880s he became chair of a Malay club called Medan Perdamaian which had roughly 80 members; he was also advisor to other clubs, and founded one in Pariaman called Medan Peramean (amusement forum). In 1891, after some time of not being promoted he decided to leave the prosecutor world to pursue new interests. He continued to work for the government as an informal detective.

It was at around this time that he devoted himself more completely to literary and intellectual pursuits. He became editor of Palita Ketjil, one of the first Malay language newspapers in Sumatra, which had been founded a decade earlier. He helped develop it from a rudimentary publication reporting on auctions and advertisements into a forum for intellectuals (mostly schoolteachers and government officials) to have public debates. In its pages he became a vocal defender of Minangkabau Adat against modernizing Muslims who wanted to abolish it and follow Middle Eastern Islam more closely. He also fell afoul of the strict Dutch censorship laws; within the first year he was fined 100 Guilder and sentence to one month's imprisonment for printing content deemed defamatory of local officials.

In 1895 he resigned from Palita Ketjil and became editor of another paper in Padang, Warta Berita (news report). (According to newspaper historian Ahmat Adam, they may have been the same newspaper with a change in name.) He continued to face legal troubles for printing coverage of local politics at the new paper; in 1896 he was sentenced to three months' exile for defamatory content he had printed, although he was eventually acquitted. He also became a regular correspondent in Insulinde, a Padang intellectual magazine. In 1899 his efforts at improving the quality of Warta Berita attracted a new round of investors; he was made editor-in-chief with a new team of assistant editors and the cost of the paper rose due to its longer format.

In 1904 he became an editor at Tjaja Soematera (light of Sumatra), a Dutch-funded Malay newspaper. During his time there he was greatly influenced by world politics, including the Russo-Japanese War and the Young Turk Revolution. He started to organize his followers, who believed in Adat as well as societal progress, as the kaoem moeda (young group), a term popularized by Abdoel Rivai. He was extremely loyal to the Dutch and opposed to Pan-Asianism; he stated that his loyalty was not to all Asians but only to Malays. Due to this some critics of him and his paper considered him a lackey of the Dutch.

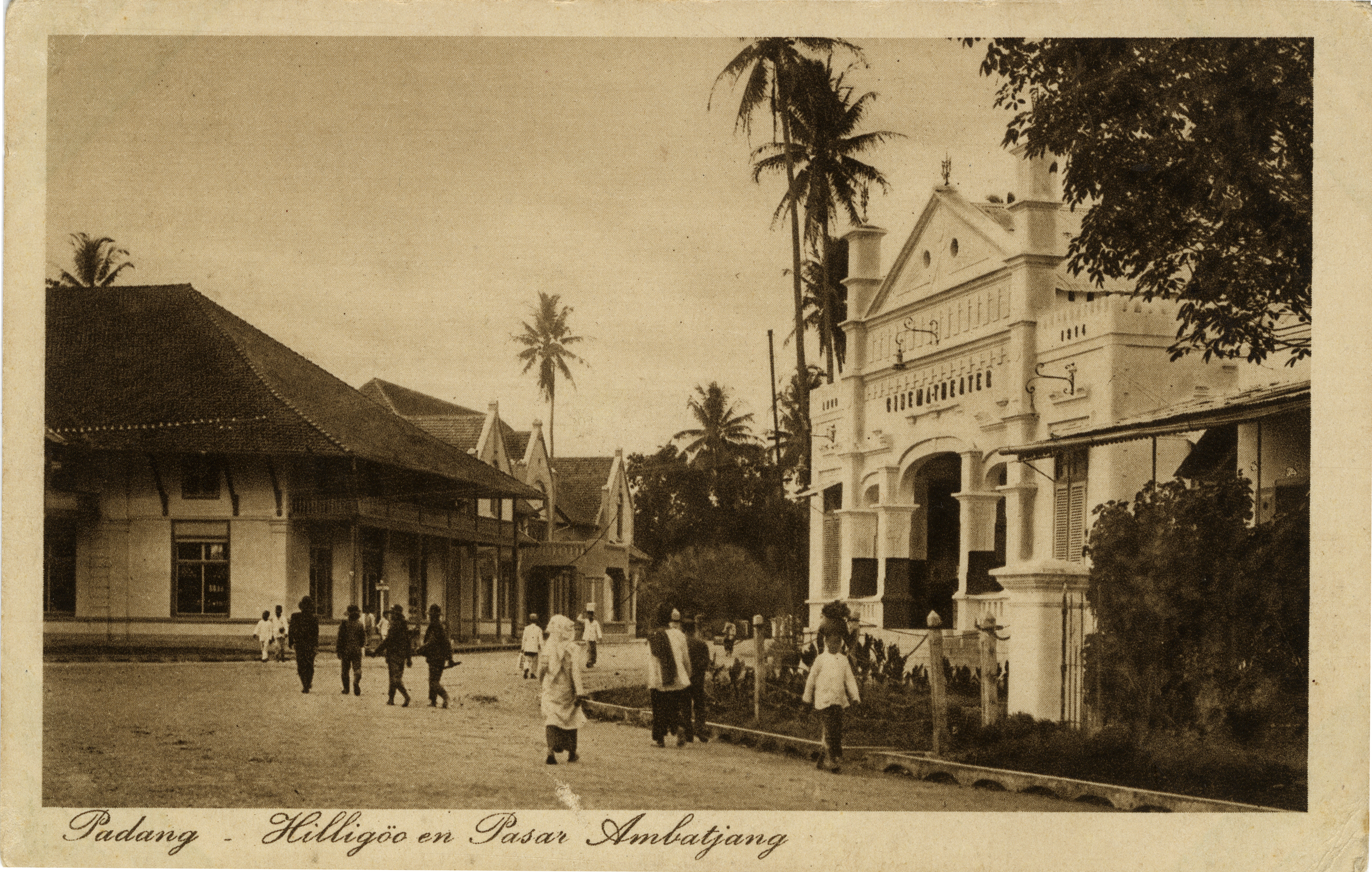
Padang - Hilligöo en Pasar Ambatjang., KITLV 1404217

In 1910 he was appointed to the municipal council (Dutch: Gemeenteraad) in Padang. That same year he left Tjaja Soematera and founded his own newspaper, Oetoesan Melajoe. It was originally printed by a Chinese printer while he raised the capital to found his own Minangkabau-owned print shop. In 1912 he had raised enough to purchase his own printing press, and from then on used it to print Oetoesan Melajoe, Al-Moenir (an Islamic modernist publication led by his son-in-law), and later Soenting Melajoe, a paper aimed at a female readership edited by Ruhana Kuddus. His relationship with Al-Moenir quickly soured, and in 1913 they left his print shop and he founded a new publication Soeloeh Melajoe (Malay torch) which aimed to represent Malay and Minangkabau Adat against Islamic modernists, whom he viewed as Wahhabists.

In 1914, with the rise of Sarekat Islam in Java and a rising anti-Chinese and anti-Arab sentiment among native Indies Muslims, he often published very negative articles about those groups in the pages of his papers. As time went on, and Sarekat Islam and other organizations became vocally anti-Dutch, he turned against them as well. He became bitter rivals of Abdul Muis and Abdoel Rivai and other such early Indonesian nationalist figures and accused them of ingratitude towards the Dutch. Because of this, many of the young Western-educated Minangkabau intellectuals turned against him or lost interest in him. He remained on Padang city council during and after the war, until at least 1918.

He spent his final years from 1918 to 1921 researching and writing about Minangkabau history in an attempt to steer the progressive movement towards embracing local tradition and rejecting European, Middle Eastern, or Javanese influence.

He died in Kasang, just north of Padang, of a heart ailment in June 1921.
