= Ruhana Kuddus =

Indonesian journalist

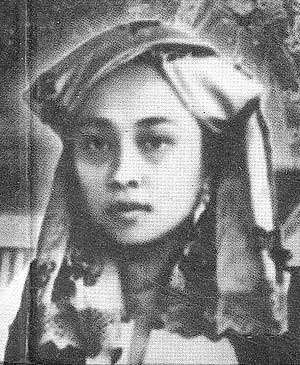
- Roehana Koeddoes, ca. 1900
- Born: Siti Roehana; 20 December 1884; Agam, Dutch East Indies
- Died: 16 August 1972 (aged 87); Jakarta, Indonesia
- Occupation: Journalist
- Writing career
- Period: 20th century

Ruhana Kuddus, or Rohana Kudus (Note: Although it's incorrect in Perfect Spelling, this version is more popular name.) (Old Spelling: Roehana Koeddoes; 20 December 1884 – 16 August 1972) was the first female Indonesian journalist, founder of the newspaper Soenting Melajoe, and an activist for women's emancipation.

== Biography ==
=== Early life ===
She was born Siti Ruhana on 20 December 1884, in the village (nagari) of Koto Gadang, Agam Regency, in the hinterland of West Sumatra, Dutch East Indies. Her father Mohammad Rasjad Maharaja Soetan was the chief public prosecutor of Jambi Residency and later of Medan. Ruhana was the half-sister of Sutan Sjahrir, and a cousin of Agus Salim, both important intellectuals and politicians in the Indonesian independence movement. She was also an aunt (mak tuo) of Indonesian poet Chairil Anwar. Ruhana was intelligent although she did not receive a formal education. She often studied with her father, who taught her in reading and language studies. When her father was assigned to Alahan Panjang, West Sumatera, she asked her neighbors (including the wife of another prosecutor) to teach her reading and writing in Jawi and Latin script, and household skills such as Lace-making. After the death of her mother in 1897, she returned to Koto Gadang and became increasingly interested in teaching the girls there to learn handicrafts and to read the Quran, despite still being a child herself.

=== Marriage and family ===
In 1908, at age 24, Ruhana married Abdoel Koeddoes, a notary public, and became known as Roehana Koeddoes. Abdoel Koeddoes was supportive of his wife's effort to educate women.

=== Educational career ===
Ruhana's earliest efforts at a more organized form of education came in 1905 when she created an artisanal school in Koto Gadang.

In February 1911, Ruhana decided to found a more organized educational society for women, named Kerajinan Amai Setia, with a school aiming specifically to teach girls crafts and skills beyond their ordinary household duties, as well as to read Jawi and Latin writing and to manage a household. During this time, she faced opposition from numerous sources who were resistant to change and advancement of women. With the support of her husband, Ruhana persisted and eventually persuaded people to her side, eventually recruiting around sixty students.

The school received official recognition from the government in 1915, and became a center for artisans to work with the Dutch government on sales of their work in major cities and overseas. It was the only craft producer that met the international standards of purchase.

She continued to work in education even while becoming a journalist. In 1916 she was appointed as a teacher at a school for Indonesians in Payakumbuh, West Sumatra.

=== Journalism career ===
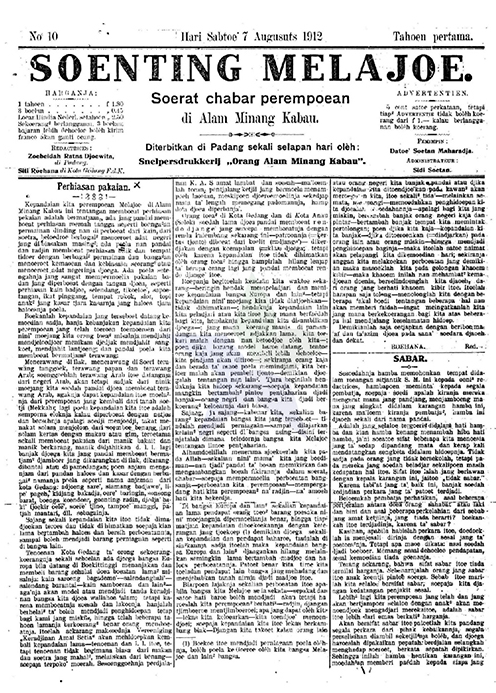
Soenting Melajoe newspaper, 7 August 1912.

Skilled in writing, Koeddoes did not stop with teaching women crafts. She believed in educating women as a whole. The following year, she send a letter to Mahyuddin Datuk Sutan Maharadja, chief editor of Oetoesan Melajoe (EYD: Utusan Melayu), proposing to start a woman-oriented newspaper.

Maharadja had already heard about Ruhana's educational activities, and so on 10 July 1912, the first issue of Soenting Melajoe (EYD: Sunting Melayu), a Malay language newspaper with women as its intended audience, was launched. The name of the newspaper refers to the Sunting, a traditional headdress worn by women, but it is also a play on another word meaning to edit or correct. Ruhana became chief editor, assisted by Mahyuddin Datuk Sutan Maharadja's daughter Zoebaidah Ratna Djoewita. She stated that the newspaper would aim to improve the education level of Indonesian women, especially as few of them could read Dutch and relatively few modern educational materials were available in the Malay language (Indonesian). The newspaper discussed the social issues of the day, including traditionalism, polygamy, divorce, and girls' education. Most of the contributors were wives of government officials or aristocrats. Eventually the continued publication of the newspaper inspired the creation of more educational societies like the one Ruhana had created in 1911.

In 1913 she accompanied the Westenenk family to the Netherlands for a time to improve her education. After returning to the Indies she continued to edit Soenting Melajoe.

In early 1921 Ruhana left Soenting Melajoe for unknown reasons and Soetan Maharadja appointed his own daughter Retna Tenoen as the new editor. However, Soenting Melajoe did not last long after that and apparently printed its last issue in January 1921 along with Soetan Maharadja's other paper Oetoesan Melajoe.

== Death and honours ==
Roehana Koeddoes died in Jakarta on 16 August 1972, one day before the 27th Indonesian Independence Day. She was buried in Karet Bivak Cemetery.

In 1974, the regional government of West Sumatra honored her as the first female journalist (Wartawati Pertama). She was also awarded as the Indonesian Press Pioneer (Perintis Pers Indonesia) in 1987 and Star on Service, 1st Class (Bintang Jasa Utama) in 2007.

Since 7 November 2019, the Indonesian government declared Roehana Koeddoes as a National Hero of Indonesia through Presidential Decree no. 120/TK/2019 and given to her grandchild as heir on following day. Two years later, she was celebrated in a Google Doodle.

== Legacy ==
Her name is used (with popular version) for a hall at the Gelora Haji Agus Salim Sports Complex, as street name in Padang, including a trademark of keripik sanjai which is located on the same road.
