= Footsteps (novel) =

Novel by Pramoedya Ananta Toer

- The cover of the book's 1996 English edition
- Author: Pramoedya Ananta Toer
- Original title: Jejak Langkah
- Translator: Max Lane
- Language: Indonesian
- Series: Buru Quartet
- Genre: Historical fiction
- Set in: Batavia, Dutch East Indies
- Publication date: 1985
- Publication place: Indonesia
- English publication date: 1990

Footsteps (Indonesian: Jejak Langkah) is the third novel in the Buru Quartet tetralogy by the Indonesian author Pramoedya Ananta Toer. The tetralogy fictionalizes the life of Tirto Adhi Soerjo, an Indonesian nobleman and pioneering journalist. This installment covers the life of Minke – the first-person narrator and protagonist, based on Tirto Adhi Soerjo – after his move from Surabaya to Batavia, the capital of Dutch East Indies. The original Indonesian edition was published in 1985 and an English translation by Max Lane was published in 1990.

== Synopsis ==
The novel, like the tetralogy, is based on the life of Indonesian journalist Tirto Adhi Soerjo (1880–1918). This novel – the third installment of the tetralogy – covers the period 1901 to 1912 and is set on the island of Java, Dutch East Indies (today Indonesia). The protagonist, also the narrator, is Minke (a fictionalization of Tirto). Minke leaves Surabaya, where he studied in a prestigious high school, to go to Betawi (or Batavia), the capital of Dutch East Indies, to continue his education. There he attends the STOVIA, a school for native doctors, the only avenue for higher education available to the natives in the Dutch East Indies. He continues to encounter racist colonial policies; for example, he is not allowed to wear European dress, but instead must wear indigenous dress. While studying there he meets Mei, a Chinese activist who is working on forming an organization for the Chinese in the Indies. They marry but she soon dies of malaria.

After Mei's death, Minke continues to be drawn to politics and forms a grassroots political organization for the Indies natives. The organization is called Sarekat Dagang Islam (Islamic Traders' Union), which later becomes Sarekat Islam (Islamic Union); in real life this organization is credited as the first native grassroots organization in the Indies. Minke's writings, which are critical of the Dutch authorities, and his poor grades lead to his expulsion from the medical school. He then realizes that his passion does not lie in medicine, and becomes a journalist. He founds first a magazine and then the first newspaper to be owned and operated by natives. As writer and editor, he tries to instill political and social knowledge to his fellow Indies subjects. He also meets and marries an exiled princess, whom he loves and finds happiness with. Later he also met an Indo man named Jacques Pangemanann who asked Minke to publish his script titled 'Njai Dasima'.

After his young colleagues at the newspaper publish a highly critical editorial against the governor-general, the newspaper is banned and Minke is arrested for accusation of tax evasion. The novel ends as he is led into exile outside Java and is forced to leave his wife.

== Development ==
Like the previous books of the Buru Quartet, Pramoedya began Footsteps as oral narration to other prisoners, while he was a political prisoner in Buru. He was imprisoned without trial by the Suharto administration for fourteen years, accused of sympathizing with communists and of being involved in the 1965 coup attempt. Given the lack of materials, he based the details of the Dutch Indies at the turn of 20th century on the memory of his historical research during the 1960s. Later he was allowed to write, and composed the tetralogy in writing. Prior to the release of the book he also published a non-fiction account of Tirto Adhi Soerjo, on which the protagonist Minke was based.

The book was published in Indonesian as Jejak Langkah in 1985 and was translated into English by Max Lane in 1990.

== Themes ==
The protagonist Minke is based on Tirto Adhi Soerjo (1880–1918), a figure of the Indonesian National Awakening and one of the country's first journalists. According to Carlo Coppola of the Oakland University, reviewing the book in World Literature Today, the book demonstrates a "strong commitment to broad humanistic ideals". The book contrasts Minke's attraction towards modern technology and notions of freedom brought by the Europeans with the alienation they brought to the subjugated Indies subjects. A review by Publishers Weekly noted the book's contrast of Minke's "dream of a united, multiethnic", independent Indonesia against the "harsh realities of colonial occupation". The book also highlights the oppression and "brutal subjugation" of the Indies' native subjects by the Dutch authorities and their native collaborators. It also shows Minke's maturation through two marriages.

== Reception ==
Coppola praised Pramoedya's storytelling abilities and how the story makes the reader eagerly wait for the next installment. He also noted the book's "tenor of political tract" because it discusses the author's ideals "too lengthily" throughout. Kirkus Reviews criticised the book for its "clumsy mix" of "political reportage and [...] personal details", and "obtrusive" political agenda. Publishers Weekly said that the book was a "vibrant portrait" of Indonesia's development of nationhood, "rich in human drama and history", and praised the English translator Lane's introduction as being helpful for new readers on the topic.

For some time, the tetralogy was banned in Indonesia by the Suharto administration, as it was accused of spreading "Marxist-Leninist teaching".
