= Alahan Panjang =

- Village
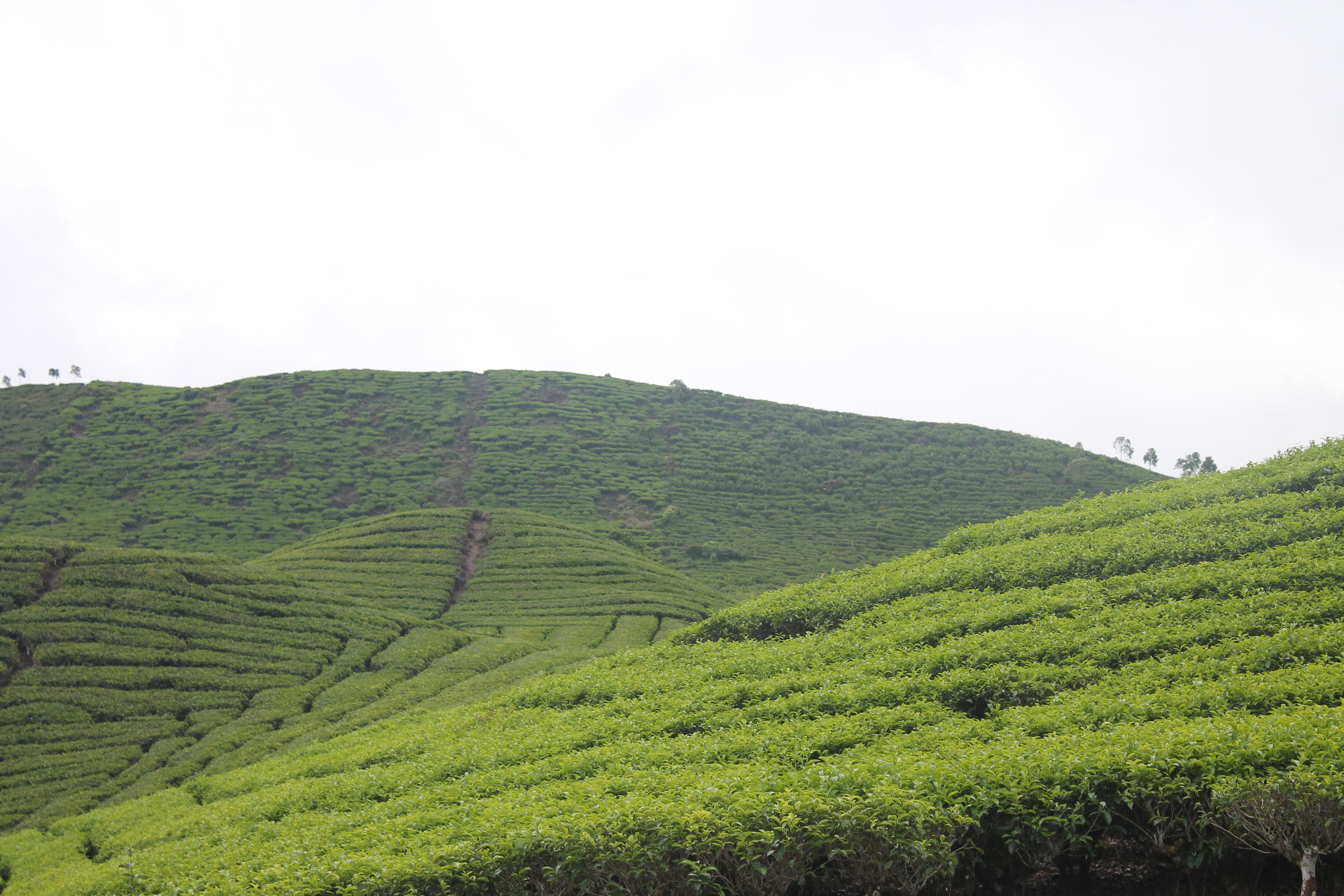

- Location within Sumatra Location within Indonesia
- Coordinates: 1°04′35″S 100°47′10″E
- Country: Indonesia
- Province: West Sumatra
- Regency: Solok
- Kecamatan: Lembah Gumanti
- Time zone: UTC+7 (WIB)

Alahan Panjang is a village in the kecamatan of Lembah Gumanti, Solok, West Sumatra, Indonesia. The village is located on Kerinci Seblat National Park's eastern slopes, at an altitude of 1,400–1,600 metres (4,600–5,200 ft), near Mount Talang. Situated between Alahan Panjang and the other nearby major town of Muara Labuh are the subvillages of Air Dingin Barat, Alang Laweh, and Sungai Kalau II.

== Economy ==
It lies in the valley of the same name in northern Minangkabau Highlands, producing rubber, coffee, sugarcane, yams, maize, tobacco and bananas and using a high amount of pesticides. The area is poor, dominated by arid farming, and notable wet rice production. European firms have established mining exploration in parts of Alahan Panjang.

== History ==
Alahan Panjang was the stronghold of the Indonesian hero Tuanku Imam Bonjol (1772–1864). After 1848, the government constructed a secondary road between Alahan Panjang and Solok, West Sumatra, located to the east. Historically, tiger hunting has been a problem that threatens the predators in the area; in 1935 alone some 500 tigers were shot by local poachers.

Alahan Panjang, along with Padang, Pariaman, Silungkang, Sawah Lunto, Sijinjung and Suliki, has been cited as an area which had particularly active communists in local politics. The area was affected by the Alahan Panjang earthquakes in 1943.

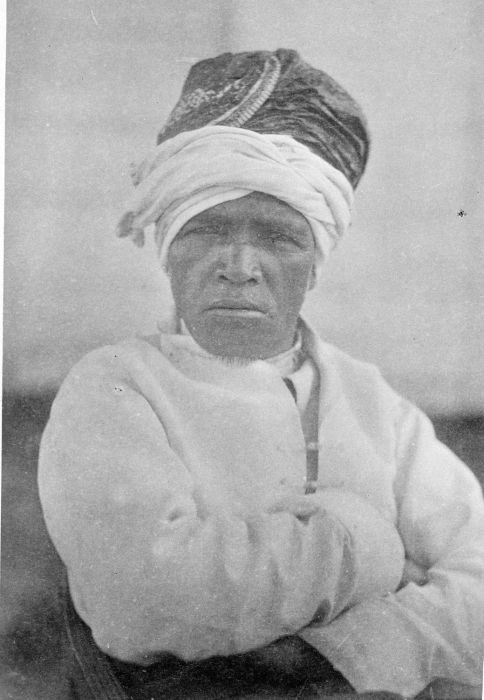

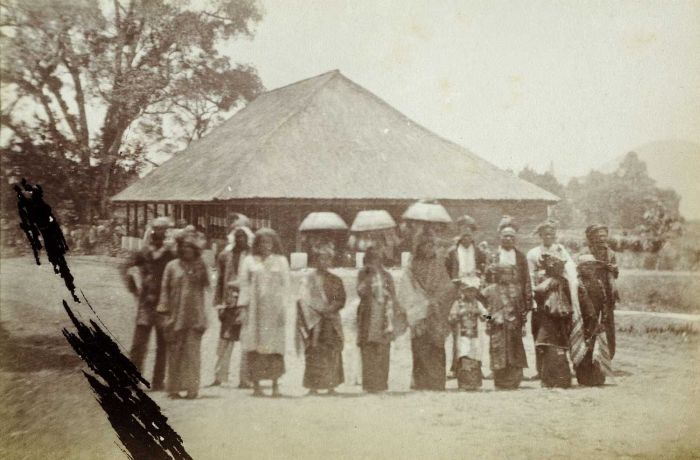

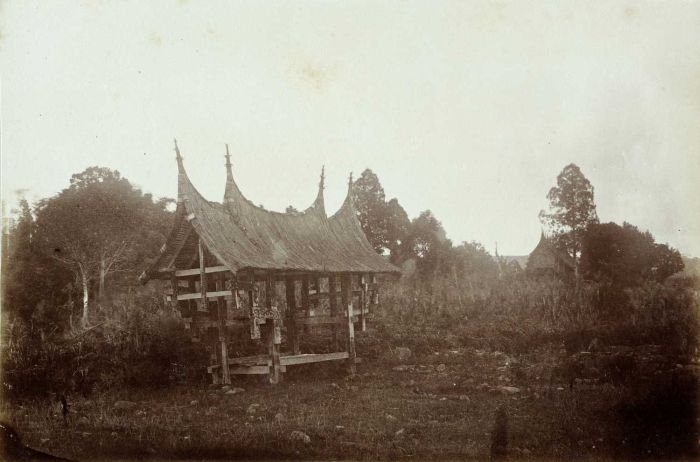

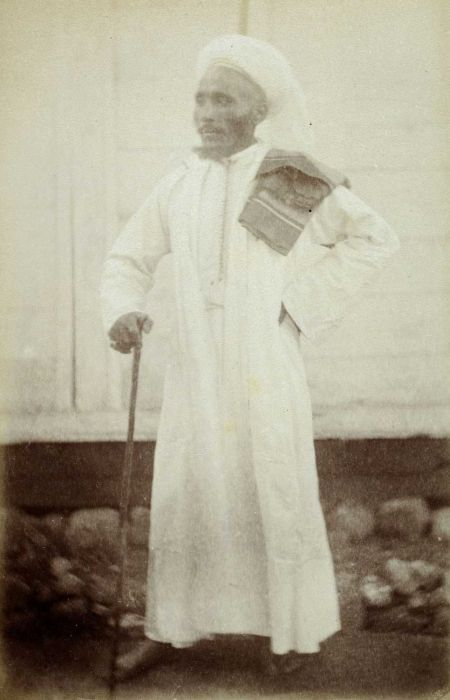

== Notable people ==
- Andjar Asmara – (1902–1961), dramatist and filmmaker
- Rohana Kudus – (1884–1972), the first female Indonesian journalist, worked in Alahan
