= Stichting Opbouw-Pembangoenan =

The Dutch-Indonesian foundation Stichting Opbouw-Pembangoenan (later Jajasan Pembangunan) was established on 24 March 1947 by the Dutch weekly Vrij Nederland. The foundation had a mixed Dutch-Indonesian board and ran bookstores and a publishing house.

== Purpose ==
Pembangoenan's goal was to spread Dutch and Indonesian literature in Dutch East India. It published translations of Dutch and English textbooks in medical, legal, sociological, and philosophical sciences, and fiction and non-fiction by young, often nationalist-oriented, Indonesian writers, including Pramoedya Ananta Toer and Chairil Anwar, and informative and literary magazines. Revenues were used for educational and social purposes.

== History ==
Opbouw-Pembangoenan was founded by chief editor H.M. van Randwijk and director C. de Koning of Vrij Nederland. Initially, board members were Attorney General K.J.L. Enthoven, Director of the High Representative of the Crown Dr P.J. Koets, representative of the Nederlands Bijbelgenootschap Mr M. de Niet Gzn., party Leader of Masyumi and prime minister in the Natsir Cabinet of 1950/51 Mohammed Natsir, Prof. Soediman Kartahadiprodjo, and Mr. Soewandi. Managing Director was Amir Sidi and Deputy Director K.J. Bas. Later Dr. Soedjatmoko became Managing Director.

After the Second World War infrastructure for the dissemination of information was lacking. There was only a national publishing house, Balai Poestaka. Vrij Nederland filled the gap with private bookstores and a publishing house under a foundation called "Stichting Opbouw", which soon changed to "Stichting Opbouw-Pembangoenan" (pembangoenan is Indonesian for building). After the sovereignty transfer (27 December 1949) the Dutch board members stepped down and only the names P.T. Pembangunan and Jajasan Pembangunan remained. Differences of insight also led to a break with Vrij Nederland, which had established the publishing house NV De Brug-Djambatan, concentrating its publishing activities in the Netherlands.

=== The book train ===
Initially, the foundation had a bookshop and printing company at Gunung Sahari 84 in Jakarta. In the run-up to the negotiations on Indonesian independence in 1949, a store was opened in Yogyakarta (Tugu Kidul 23), at that time the capital of the Indonesian Republic. In 1951 a branch was opened in Solo (Surakarta) and a book train - Kereta Boekoe Pembangoenan - was designed, which ran over Java in ten months via Cirebon, Tegal, Semarang, Surabaya, and Jember to Banyuwangi along the north coast, and via Malang, Blitar, Solo, Yogyakarta, and Bandung along the south coast back to Jakarta. Two wagons were rented, one of which was converted into a shop and the other provided two sleeping places and a bathroom. At all stations, the train remained for up to a week, and informative and educational movies were shown in the evening. The book train ran until Mr Bas departed from Indonesia in 1954. On May 26, 1954, a fourth branch opened in Jakarta (Djalan Segara III 16).

== Publication list (not exhaustive) ==
=== Magazines ===
- Tijdsein, Dutch news magazine edited for the Dutch information department, ca. 15.000 copies. One of its editors was Joop den Uyl, the later Dutch prime-minister.
- Pembangoenan, bi-lingual monthly edited by Prof. Beerling, M.A. Djoehana and Ida Nasution (until the first military offensive in July 1947)
- Gema Suasana, Indonesian literary monthly edited by young authors such as Idrus, Balfas, Pramoedya Ananta Toer en Chairil Anwar, Arabist Dr Nieuwenhuizen and journalist Dolf Verspoor
- Kritiek en Opbouw, socialist monthly edited by D.G.M. Koch
- Oriëntatie, edited by Rob Nieuwenhuys
- Children's magazine "Vuurvliegje"

=== Indonesian literature ===
- Chairil Anwar: Deru Tjampur Debu (1966, 15,000 copies)
- Nugroho Notosusanto: Rasa Sajange (1959)
- Pramoedya Ananta Toer: Keluarga Gerilja: kissah keluarga manusia dalam tiga hari dan tiga malam (1950, 5,000 copies)
- Pramoedya Ananta Toer: Subuh: tjerita-tjerita pendek revolusi (ca. 1950)
- Mohammad Yamin: Dipanagara (1952)

=== Indonesian non-specialist works ===
- P.J. Bouman: Ilmu Masyarakat Umum (1952/1957)
- M.M. Djojodigoeno: Adat law in Indonesia (1952)
- Sujono Hadinoto: Ekonomi Indonesia, dari ekonomi kolonial ke ekonomi nasional (1949)
- Mohammad Hatta: Menindjau Masalah Kooperasi (1954)
- Mohammad Hatta: Pengantar ke Djalan Ilmu dan Pengetahuan (1970)
- J. van Kan & H.H. Beekhuis: Pengantar Ilmu Hukum (1957)
- Bung Karno: Wedjanan Revolusi (1965)
- Soediman Kartahadiprodjo: Kumpulan Karangan (1965)
- Soekarno: Sarinah, kewadjiban wanita dalam perdjoangan Republik Indonesia (2nd edition, 1951)
- Nathan Keyfitz & Widjojo Nitisastro: Soal Penduduk dan Pembangunan Indonesia (1959)
- Harold J. Laski: Pengantar Ilmu Politik (1959)
- T.S.G. Mulia: Perserikatan Bangsa Bangsa, buku penuntun (1952)
- Ngabei Poerbatjaraka: Riwajat Indonesia (1952)
- T.B. Simatupang: Laporan dari Banaran (1960)
- B. Simorangkir Simanjuntak: Kesusasteraan Indonesia (1953)
- Soewardi: Hak-Hak Dasar Konstitusi-Konstitusi (1956)
- Susanto Tirtoprojo: Sedarah Revolusi Nasional Indonesia (1950)
- Kaslan A. Tohir: Sekitar Masalah Pertanian Rakjat (1953)

=== Translated literature ===
- Nienke van Hichtum: Dongeng Anak2 Dunia, translated by Ratna Suri
- Complete works of Shakespeare, translated by Mohammad Yamin
- John Steinbeck: Tikus dan Manusia (Of mice and men – translated by Pramoedya Ananta Toer) (1950)
- Jules Verne: Mengelilingi dunia dalam 80 hari (travel around the World in 80 days, translated by R. Musa Sastradimedja)

=== Translated non-specialist works ===
- Pustaka Sardjana, A series of monographies of European philosophers (Ahli2 pemikir besar tentang negara dan hukum – dari Plato ke Kant)
- J.P. van Aartsen, Ilmu Bumi Ekonomi (1951)
- Louis Fischer: Gandhi: Penghidupannya & Pesannya Untuk Dunia (1967)
- R. Roosseno: Beton Tulang (1954)
- A. Teeuw: Pokok dan Tokoh dalam Kesusastaraan Indonesia Baru (1952)

=== Dutch ===
- D.M.G. Koch: Om de Vrijheid, de nationalistische beweging in Indonesië (1950)
- A. Teeuw: Voltooid voorspel, Indonesische literatuur tussen twee Wereldoorlogen
