= Pembrita Betawi =

Daily Newspaper in Batavia, Dutch East Indies (1884–1916)

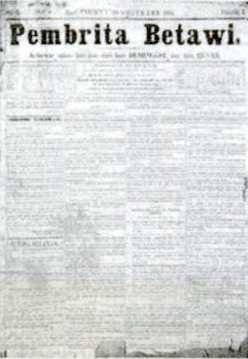
- Front page, c. 1885
- Type: Daily
- Founder(s): J. Kieffer
- Founded: 1884
- Language: Vernacular Malay
- Ceased publication: 1916
- Headquarters: Batavia, Dutch East Indies

Pembrita Betawi (lit. 'Batavian Reporter') was a daily newspaper from Batavia (now Jakarta), Dutch East Indies, which was published from 1884 until 1916. It was established as a joint venture between the Indo journalists J. Kieffer and W. Meulenhoff. The newspaper saw several changes of ownership until rights were acquired by Albrecht in 1887. Notable contributors included Lie Kim Hok and Tirto Adhi Soerjo.

== History ==
A vernacular Malay press had begun to develop in the Dutch East Indies (now Indonesia) in the mid-19th century. Initial newspapers were short-lasting, but the 1880s saw a more resilient Malay-language press. These early Malay newspapers were mostly run by Indo men – Eurasians of mixed Dutch and native ancestry – and located in major trade cities. Pembrita Betawi, located in the colonial capital at Batavia (now Jakarta), was no exception.

The first edition of Pembrita Betawi was published on 24 December 1884. The newspaper was published daily, except on Sundays and holidays, with the Indo journalist J. Kieffer as editor-in-chief and possibly with funds from W. Meulenhoff, a journalist who had previously worked with Kieffer. The newspaper was printed by W. Bruining Co. and distributed throughout Batavia. Kieffer had previously headed several newspapers, including Bintang Barat and Bintang Betawi, although none of them had been long-lasting. The newspaper consisted of four pages, two for news and two for advertisements. To help promote the newspaper, Kieffer held a raffle for all readers willing to subscribe to a full year.

By 8 June 1885 the newspaper was owned entirely by Meulenhoff; Kieffer had left Pembrita Betawi by that time. Meulenhoff changed the newspaper's printing press to Albrecht Co., also in Batavia. The following year Meulenhoff brought on Lie Kim Hok, a peranakan Chinese writer and teacher, as a business partner; Meulenhoff was one of several Dutch and Indo newspaper heads who brought in Chinese partners during this period. With 1,000 gulden Lie bought half of the shares in the company. Printing rights were soon acquired by Lie's Bogor-based printing house, also named Lie Kim Hok, and the first edition under this leadership was published on 1 June 1886. Lie and Meulenhoff worked on the newspaper together, dividing administrative and editorial duties between them, and his printing press was moved to Batavia.

On 2 June 1887 it was announced that Pembrita Betawi had been sold to Karsseboom & Co. Meulenhoff was retained as editor-in-chief. Lie Kim Hok's printing press was retained for several months, before the press – including its stock and printing rights for Pembrita Betawi – was sold to Albrecht. Lie had no involvement with the newspaper afterwards, and Albrecht continued to print Pembrita Betawi until the newspaper was shut down in 1916; native-owned newspapers had become more common in the early 1910s, leading to a reduction in Pembrita Betawi's circulation.

== Contents ==
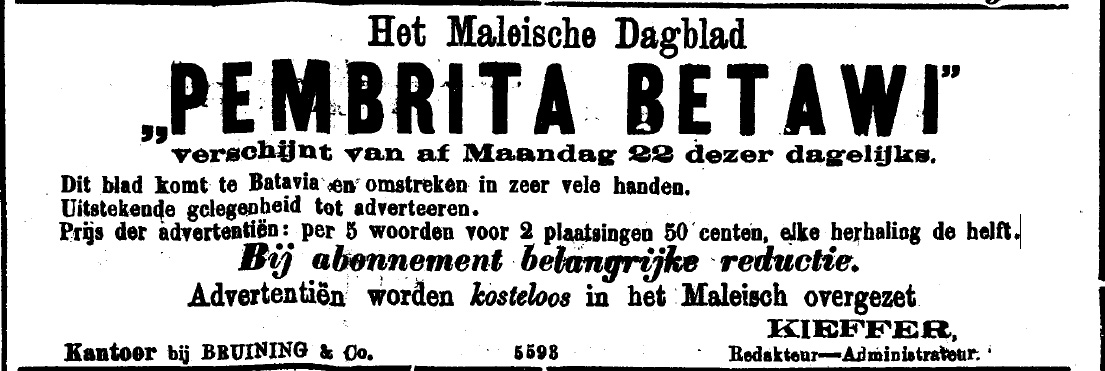
Dutch-language ad for Pembrita Betawi, 1884

Pembrita Betawi contained a variety of contents, including news, writings on entertainment and polemics. In the early years after its establishment, the newspaper focused on news relating to the Indies, with a special section for topics of interest to Chinese Indonesians. Around 1907 Pembrita Betawi began publishing news related to native ethnic groups, who were becoming increasingly literate through the Dutch Ethical Policy which, among other things, promoted education for non-Europeans. Writing under the pen name Kalam Langit, the ethnic-Chinese writer Na Tian Piet wrote extensively about Singapore. Editorials published between 1901 and 1903 in the column Dreyfusiana (a reference to the then-ongoing Dreyfus affair in France) and written by Tirto Adhi Soerjo, a young Javanese journalist, contained scathing criticism of the Dutch colonial government and perceived misuses of power.

Stage dramas, including bangsawan troupes, received extensive coverage in Pembrita Betawi. The newspaper's staff wrote positively about various troupes and published casting calls for them. Meanwhile, letters from readers about the theatre – including complaints of oversexuality unfitting for young women – were published.

== Works cited ==
- Adam, Ahmat (1995). The Vernacular Press and the Emergence of Modern Indonesian Consciousness (1855–1913). Studies on Southeast Asia. Vol. 17. Ithaca: Cornell University Press. ISBN 978-0-87727-716-3.
- Anshoriy Ch, M Nasruddin; Tjakrawerdaya, Djunaidi (2008). Rekam Jejak Dokter Pejuang & Pelopor Kebangkitan Nasional [Recording the Traces of the Freedom-fighting Doctor and Key Figure in the National Awakening] (in Indonesian). Yogyakarta: LKiS. ISBN 9789791283618.
- Cohen, Matthew Isaac (2006). The Komedie Stamboel: Popular Theater in Colonial Indonesia, 1891–1903. Athens: Ohio University Press. ISBN 978-0-89680-246-9.
- Latif, Yudi (2005). Inteligensia Muslim dan Kuasa: Genealogi Inteligensia Muslim Indonesia Abad ke-20 [Muslim Intellectuals and Power: Genealogy of Indonesian Muslim Intellectuals of the 20th Century] (in Indonesian). Bandung: Mizan. ISBN 9789794334003.
- Setyautama, Sam; Mihardja, Suma (2008). Tokoh-tokoh Etnis Tionghoa di Indonesia [Ethnic Chinese Figures in Indonesia] (in Indonesian). Jakarta: Gramedia. ISBN 978-979-9101-25-9.
- Tio, Ie Soei (1958). Lie Kimhok 1853–1912 (in Indonesian). Bandung: Good Luck. OCLC 1069407.
