= Mount Talang =

Active stratovolcano in west Sumatra, Indonesia

Talang
- Gunung Talang
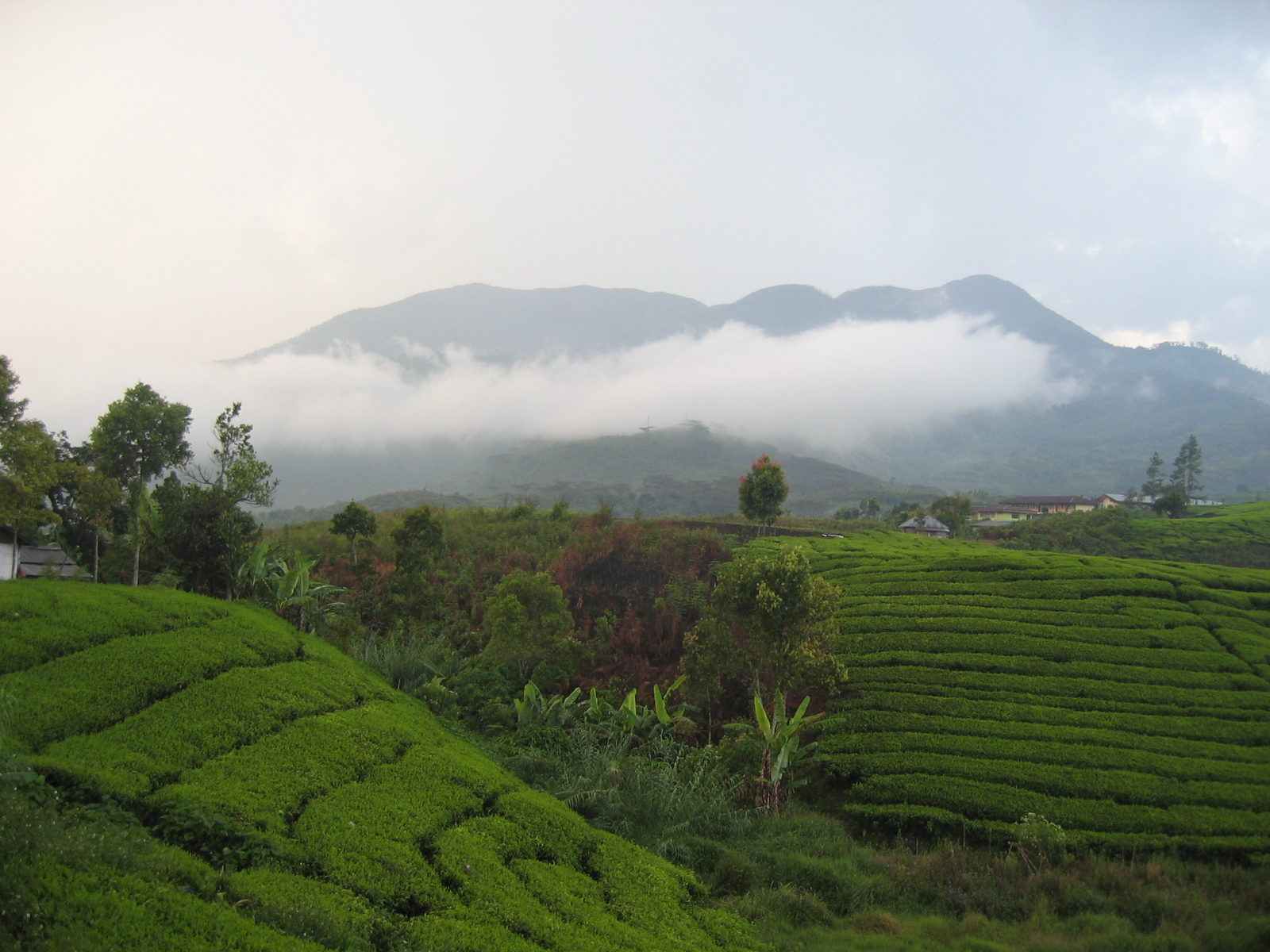
- Talang, July 2007

Highest point
- Elevation: 2,597 m (8,520 ft)
- Listing: Ribu
- Coordinates: 00°58′42″S 100°40′46″E

Geography
- Location within Indonesia Location within Sumatra
- Location: West Sumatra, Indonesia

Geology
- Mountain type: Stratovolcano
- Volcanic arc: Sunda Arc
- Last eruption: November to December 2007

Mount Talang (Indonesian: Gunung Talang) (2,597 m [8,520 ft]) is an active stratovolcano in West Sumatra, Indonesia. Talang has two crater lakes on its flanks, the largest of which is 1 by 2 kilometres (0.62 mi × 1.24 mi) wide and is called Lake Talang.

According to the Smithsonian Institution Global Volcanism Program, Mount Talang has had eight confirmed eruptions between 1833 and 1968. A minor eruption followed in April 2005, over 25,000 inhabitants of the local area being evacuated due to fears of further volcanic eruptions. Geologists say that the eruption in April 2005 is connected to the devastating December 2004 Indian Ocean earthquake.

The pitcher plant Nepenthes talangensis is named after the mountain and is thought to be endemic to its upper slopes.

== See also ==
- List of volcanoes in Indonesia
