= Buru Quartet =

1980–1988 novels by Pramoedya Ananta Toer

- Original title: Tetralogi Buru
- Language: Indonesian
- Genre: Historical fiction
- Published: 1980-88
- Publication place: Indonesia

The Buru Quartet or Buru Tetralogy (Indonesian: Tetralogi Buru) is a literary tetralogy written by Indonesian author Pramoedya Ananta Toer at Buru Island detention camp in Maluku. It is composed of the novels This Earth of Mankind, Child of All Nations, Footsteps, and House of Glass, published between 1980 and 1988. The book series is loosely based on the life of Tirto Adhi Soerjo.

The Buru Quartet books were banned by the regime of long-serving Indonesian president Suharto. The ban was lifted in 2010.
