= Pramoedya Ananta Toer =

Indonesian novelist and writer (1925–2006)

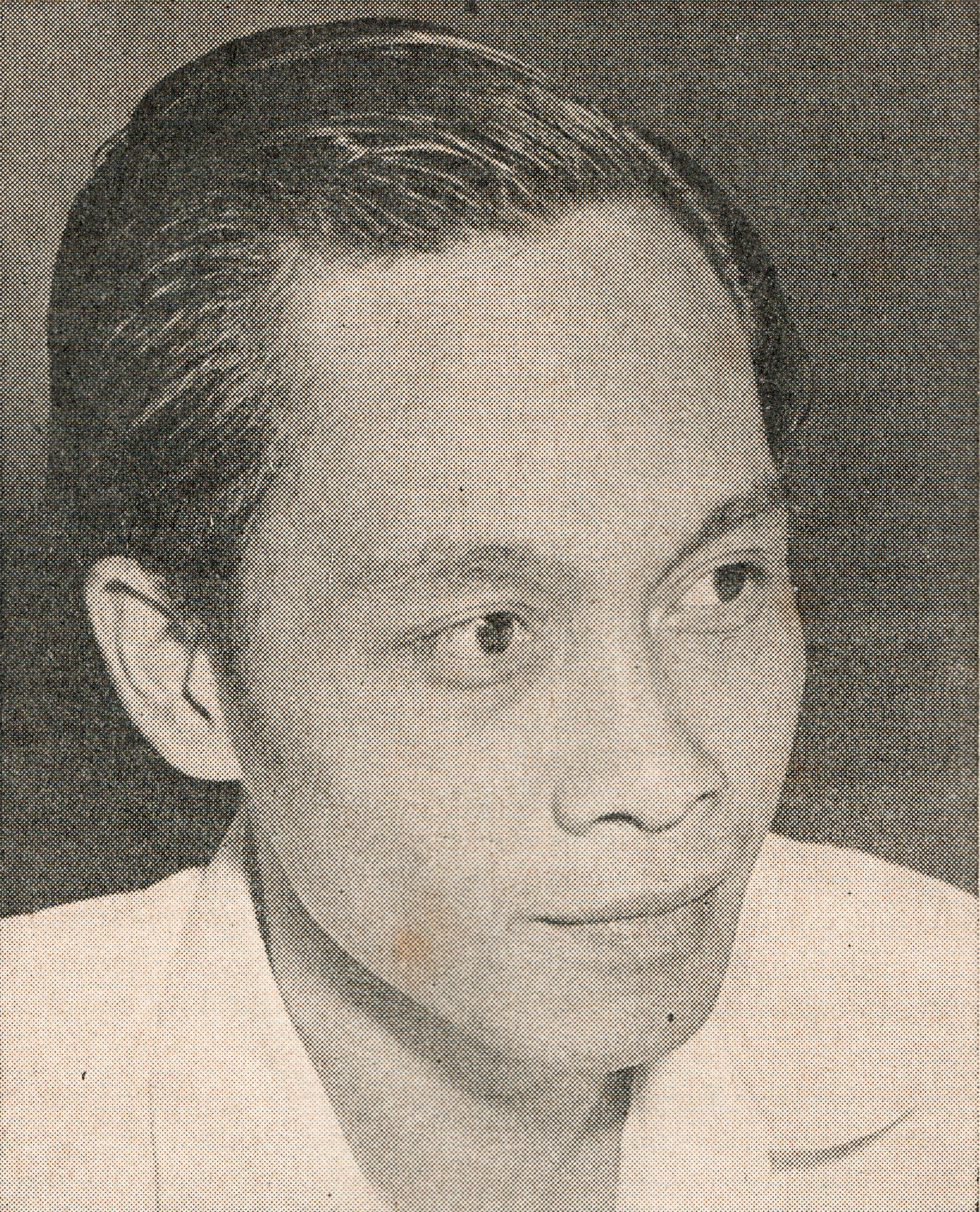
- Pramoedya, c. 1955
- Born: 6 February 1925; Blora, Dutch East Indies
- Died: 30 April 2006 (aged 81); Jakarta, Indonesia
- Occupations: Novelist; essayist
- Spouses: Arvah Iljas (m. 1950; div. 1954) Maemunah Thamrin (m. 1955; died 2006)
- Writing career
- Notable works: The Buru Quartet; This Earth of Mankind; Child of All Nations; Footsteps; House of Glass

Pramoedya Ananta Toer (EYD: Pramudya Ananta Tur; 6 February 1925 – 30 April 2006), also nicknamed Pram, was an Indonesian novelist and writer. His works span the colonial period under Dutch rule, Indonesia's struggle for independence, its occupation by Japan during World War II, as well as the post-colonial authoritarian regimes of Sukarno and Suharto, and are infused with personal and national history.

Pramoedya's writings sometimes fell out of favour with the colonial and later the authoritarian native governments in power. He faced censorship in Indonesia during the pre-Reformasi era even though he was well-known outside Indonesia. Dutch authorities imprisoned him from 1947 to 1949 during the War of Independence. During the transition to the Suharto regime, he was caught up in the shifting tides of political change and power struggles. Suharto had him imprisoned from 1969 to 1979 on the Maluku island of Buru and branded him a Communist. He was seen as a holdover from the previous regime, despite having struggled with it. It was on the Island of Buru that he composed his most famous work, the Buru Quartet. Not permitted access to writing materials, he recited the story orally to other prisoners before it was written down and smuggled out.

Pramoedya opposed some policies of founding President Sukarno as well as the New Order regime of Suharto, Sukarno's successor. Political criticisms were often subtle in his writing, although he was outspoken against colonialism, racism, and corruption of the new Indonesian government. During the many years in which he suffered imprisonment and house arrest (in Jakarta after his imprisonment in Buru), he became a cause célèbre for advocates of human rights and freedom of expression. He was nominated for the Nobel Prize in Literature eight times.

== Early years ==
Pramoedya was born on 6 February 1925, in the town of Blora in the heartland of Java, then a part of the Dutch East Indies. He was the firstborn son in his family; his father was a teacher, who was also active in Boedi Oetomo (the first recognized indigenous national organization in Indonesia) and his mother was a rice trader. His maternal grandfather had taken the pilgrimage to Mecca. As it is written in his semi-autobiographical collection of short stories "Cerita Dari Blora", his name was originally Pramoedya Ananta Mastoer. However, he felt that the family name Mastoer (his father's name) seemed too aristocratic. The Javanese prefix "Mas" refers to a man of a higher rank in a noble family. Consequently, he omitted "Mas" and kept Toer as his family name. He went on to the Radio Vocational School in Surabaya but had barely graduated from the school when Japan invaded Surabaya (1942).

During World War II, Pramoedya (like many Indonesian Nationalists, Sukarno and Suharto among them) at first supported the occupying forces of Imperial Japan. He believed the Japanese to be the lesser of two evils, compared to the Dutch. He worked as a typist for a Japanese newspaper in Jakarta. As the war went on, however, Indonesians were dismayed by the austerity of wartime rationing and by increasingly harsh measures taken by the Japanese military. The Nationalist forces loyal to Sukarno switched their support to the incoming Allies against Japan; all indications are that Pramoedya did as well.

On 17 August 1945, after the news of the Allied victory over Japan reached Indonesia, Sukarno proclaimed Indonesian independence. This touched off the Indonesian National Revolution against the forces of the British and Dutch. In this war, Pramoedya joined a paramilitary group in Karawang, Kranji (West Java), and eventually was stationed in Jakarta. During this time he wrote short stories and books, as well as propaganda for the Nationalist cause. He was eventually imprisoned by the Dutch in Jakarta in 1947 and remained there until 1949, the year the Netherlands recognised Indonesian independence. While imprisoned in Bukit Duri from 1947 to 1949 for his role in the Indonesian Revolution, he wrote his first major novels The Fugitive and Guerilla Family with financial support from the Opbouw-Pembangoenan Foundation, which also published the books.

== Post-Independence prominence ==
In the first years after the struggle for independence, Pramoedya wrote several works of fiction dealing with the problems of the newly founded nation, as well as semi-autobiographical works based on his wartime memoirs. He was soon able to live in the Netherlands as part of a cultural exchange program. In the years that followed, he took an interest in several other cultural exchanges, including trips to the Soviet Union and the People's Republic of China, as well as translations of Russian writers Maxim Gorky and Leo Tolstoy.

In Indonesia, Pramoedya built up a reputation as a literary and social critic, joining the left-wing writers' group Lekra and writing in various newspapers and literary journals. His writing style became more politically charged, as evidenced in his story Korupsi (Corruption), a critical fiction of a civil servant who falls into the trap of corruption. This created friction between him and the government of Sukarno.

From the late 1950s, Pramoedya began teaching literary history at the left-wing Universitas Res Publica. As he prepared the material, he began to realise that the study of the Indonesian language and literature had been distorted by the Dutch colonial authorities. He sought out materials that had been ignored by colonial educational institutions, and which had continued to be ignored after independence.

Having spent time in China, he became greatly sympathetic to the Indonesian Chinese over the persecution they faced in post-colonial Indonesia. Most notably, he published a series of letters addressed to an imaginary Chinese correspondent discussing the history of the Indonesian Chinese, called Hoakiau di Indonesia (History of the Overseas Chinese in Indonesia). He criticised the government for being too centred on Java and insensitive to the needs and desires of the other regions and peoples of Indonesia. As a result, he was arrested by the Indonesian military and jailed at Cipinang prison for nine months.

== Imprisonment under Suharto ==
In an October 1965 coup, the army took power after alleging that the assassination of several senior generals was masterminded by the Communist Party of Indonesia (PKI). The transition to Suharto's New Order followed, and Pramoedya's position as the head of the People's Cultural Organisation, a literary group with connections to the PKI, caused him to be considered a communist and an enemy of the "New Order" regime. During the violent anti-Communist purge, he was arrested, beaten, and imprisoned by Suharto's government and named a tapol ("political prisoner"). His books were banned from circulation, and he was imprisoned without trial, first in Nusa Kambangan off the southern coast of Java, and then in the penal colony of Buru in the eastern islands of the Indonesian archipelago.

He was banned from writing during his imprisonment on the island of Buru but still managed to compose - orally - his best-known series of work to date, the Buru Quartet, a series of four historical fiction novels chronicling the development of Indonesian nationalism and based in part on his own experiences growing up. The English titles of the books in the tetralogy are This Earth of Mankind, Child of All Nations, Footsteps, and House of Glass. The main character of the series, Minke, a Javanese minor royal, was based in part on an Indonesian journalist active in the nationalist movement, Tirto Adhi Soerjo.

The quartet includes strong female characters of Indonesian and Chinese ethnicity and addresses the discrimination and indignities of living under colonial rule and the struggle for personal and national political independence. Like much of Pramoedya's work, it tells personal stories and focuses on individuals caught up in the tide of a nation's history.

Pramoedya had researched for the books before his imprisonment in the Buru prison camp. When he was arrested, his library was burned, and much of his collection and early writings were lost. In Buru, he was not permitted even to have a pencil. Doubting that he would ever be able to write the novels down himself, he narrated them to his fellow prisoners. With the support of other prisoners who took on extra labour to reduce his workload, Pramoedya was eventually able to write the novels down, and the published works derived their name "Buru Quartet" after the prison. They have been collected and published in English (translated by Max Lane) and Indonesian, as well as many other languages. Though the work is considered a classic by many outside of Indonesia, the publication was banned in Indonesia, causing one of the most famous of Indonesia's literary works to be mostly unavailable to the country's people whose history it addressed. Copies were scanned by Indonesians abroad and distributed via the Internet to people inside the country.

Pramoedya's works on colonial Indonesia recognised the importance of Islam as a vehicle for widespread opposition to the Dutch, but his works are not overtly religious. He rejected those who used religion to deny critical thinking, and on occasion wrote with considerable negativity to the religiously pious.

== Release and subsequent works ==
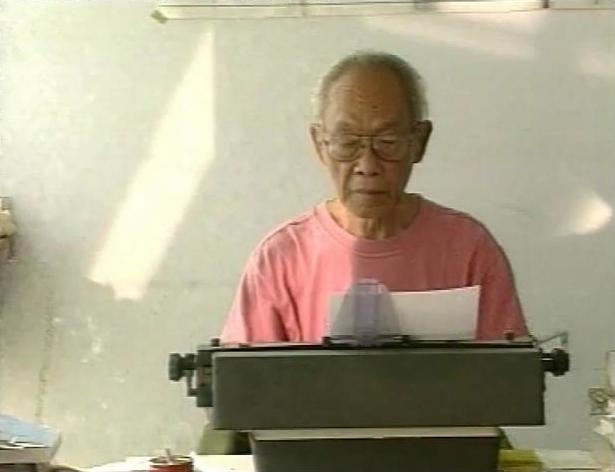
Pramoedya in the 1990s

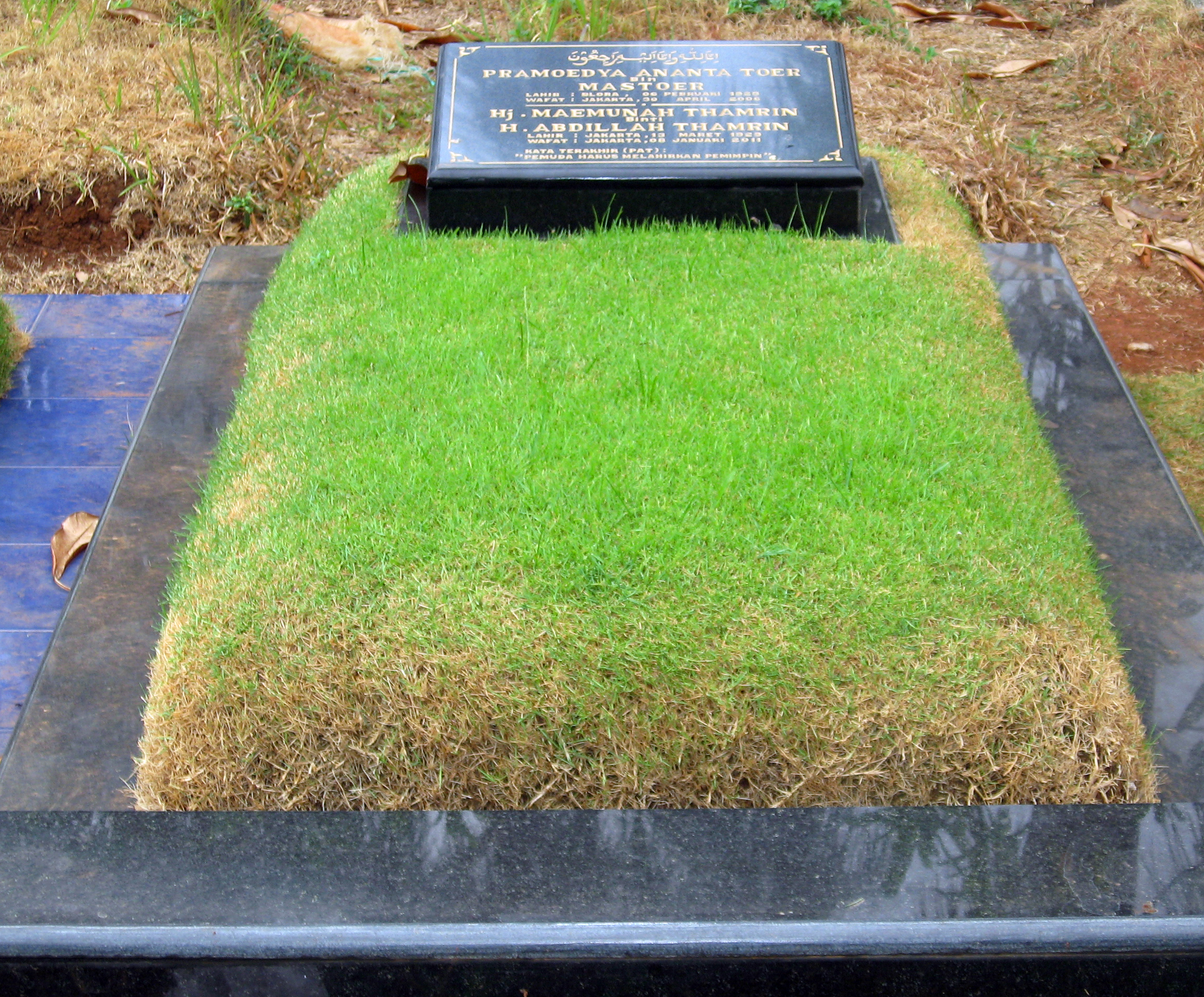
Pramoedya's grave in Karet Bivak Cemetery, Jakarta

Pramoedya was released from imprisonment in 1979 but remained under house arrest in Jakarta until 1992. During this time he released The Girl From the Coast, another semi-fictional novel based on his grandmother's own experience (volumes 2 and 3 of this work were destroyed along with his library in 1965). He also wrote Nyanyi Sunyi Seorang Bisu (1995); The Mute's Soliloquy, an autobiography based on the letters that he wrote for his daughter from imprisonment in Buru but were not allowed to be sent, and Arus Balik (1995).

He wrote many columns and short articles criticising the Indonesian government. He wrote the book Perawan Remaja dalam Cengkeraman Militer (Young Virgins in the Military's Grip), a documentary showcasing the plight of Javanese women who were forced to become comfort women during the Japanese occupation and were subsequently subject to oppression by their Indonesian society. The women were brought to Buru where they were sexually abused by the Japanese and ended up staying there instead of returning to Java. Pramoedya's fellow political prisoners were able to meet some of these women (generally only once) and relate this information to Pramoedya, who wrote it down in narrative form in the 1970s, providing the basis for the book published in 2001.

Pramoedya was hospitalised on 27 April 2006, for complications brought on by diabetes and heart disease. He was also a heavy smoker of Kretek (clove) cigarettes and had endured years of abuse while in detention. After his release, his health deteriorated and on 30 April he died in his daughter's home. Pramoedya earned several accolades and was frequently discussed as Indonesia's and Southeast Asia's best candidate for a Nobel Prize in Literature.

Pramoedya's writings on Indonesia address the international and regional currents caused by political events in history and how these events flowed through his homeland and buffeted its people. Pramoedya also shares a personal history of hardship and detention for his efforts of self-expression and the political aspects of his writings and struggles against the censorship of his work by the leaders of his people.

== Personal life ==
Pramoedya married Arvah Iljas in 1950. However, the couple divorced in 1954. He remarried to Maemunah Thamrin in 1955. She died a couple of months before Pramoedya's death in 2006.

== Awards ==
- 1988 PEN/Barbara Goldsmith Freedom to Write Award.
- 1989 The Fund for Free Expression Award, New York, USA.
- 1992 English P.E.N Centre Award, Great Britain.
- 1992 Stichting Wertheim Award, Netherland.
- 1995 Ramon Magsaysay Award for Journalism, Literature, and Creative Communication Arts.
- 1999 Doctor Honoris Causa from the University of Michigan.
- 1999 Chancellor's Distinguished Honor Award from the University of California, Berkeley.
- 2000 Chevalier de l'Ordre des Arts et des Lettres Republic of France.
- 2000 11th Fukuoka Asian Culture Prize.
- 2004 Norwegian Authors' Union award for his contribution to world literature and his continuous struggle for the right to freedom of expression.
- 2004 Pablo Neruda Award, Chile
- 2005 Global Intellectuals Poll by the Prospect.

== Major works ==
- Kranji-Bekasi Jatuh ("The Fall of Kranji-Bekasi") (1947)
- Perburuan (The Fugitive (novel)) (1950)
- Keluarga Gerilya ("Guerilla Family") (1950)
- Bukan Pasar Malam (It's Not an All Night Fair) (1951)
- Cerita dari Blora (Story from Blora) (1952)
- Gulat di Jakarta ("Wrestling in Jakarta") (1953)
- Korupsi (Corruption) (1954)
- Midah - Si Manis Bergigi Emas ("Midah - The Beauty with Golden Teeth") (1954)
- Cerita Calon Arang (The King, the Witch, and the Priest) (1957)
- Larasati (1960)
- Hoakiau di Indonesia (Chinese of Indonesia) (1960)
- Panggil Aku Kartini Saja I & II ("Just Call Me Kartini I & II") (1962)
- Gadis Pantai (Girl from the Coast) (1962)
- The Buru Quartet
  - Bumi Manusia (This Earth of Mankind) (1980)
  - Anak Semua Bangsa (Child of All Nations) (1980)
  - Jejak Langkah (Footsteps) (1985)
  - Rumah Kaca (House of Glass) (1988)
- Nyanyi Sunyi Seorang Bisu (The Mute's Soliloquy) (1995)
- Arus Balik (1995)
- Arok Dedes (1999)
- Mangir (1999)
- Perawan Remaja dalam Cengkeraman Militer: Catatan Pulau Buru (2001)
- All That Is Gone (2004)
- Narration for the Dutch film Jalan Raya Pos Great Post Road
