= Tjhit Liap Seng =

1886 novel by Lie Kim Hok

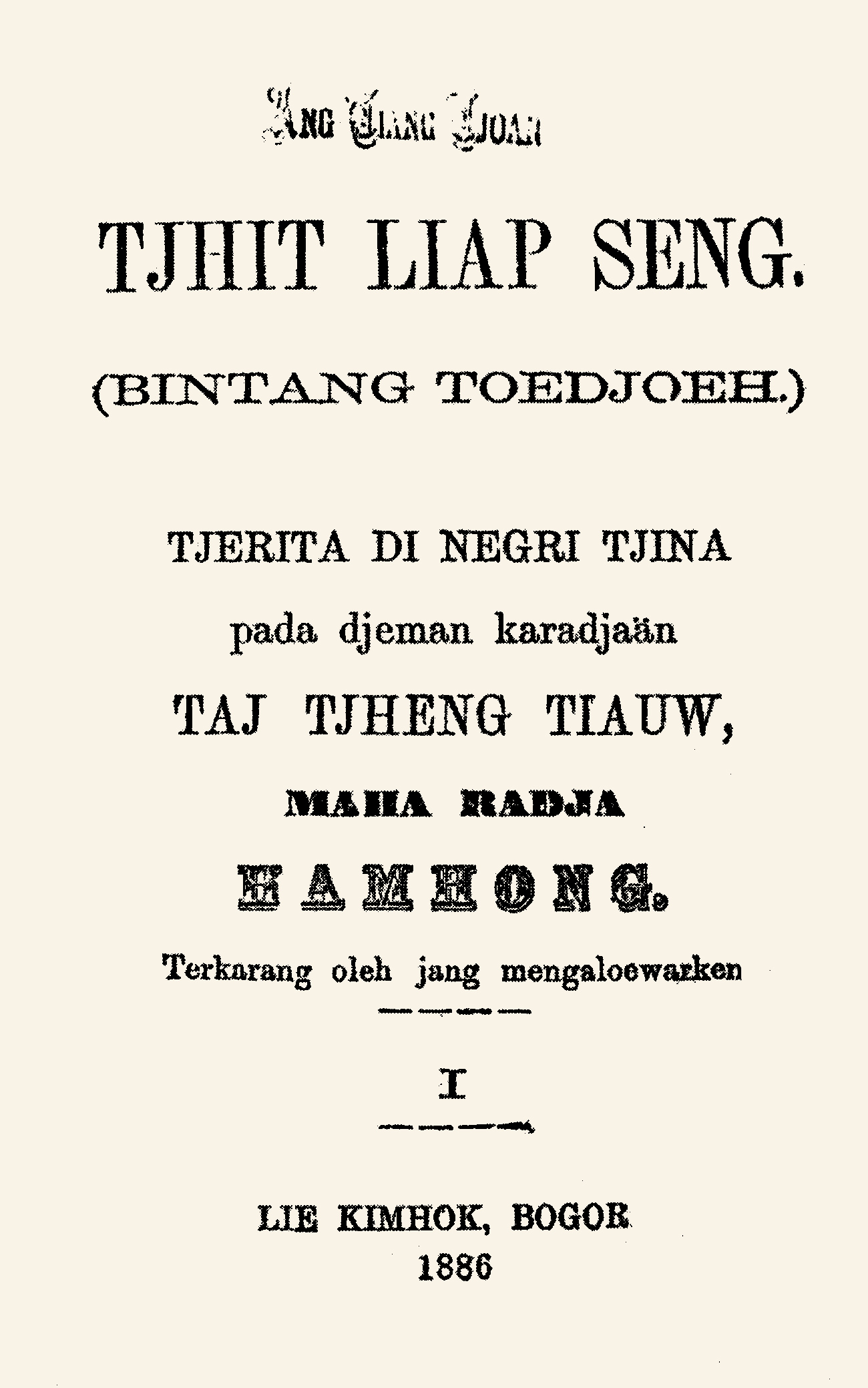
- Cover
- Author: Lie Kim Hok
- Language: Malay
- Publisher: Lie Kim Hok
- Publication date: 1886
- Publication place: Dutch East Indies (today Indonesia)
- Pages: 500

Tjhit Liap Seng (Perfected Spelling: Chit Liap Seng, Hokkien for Seven Stars or Pleiades; Chinese: 七粒星; Pe̍h-ōe-jī: Chhit Lia̍p Seng), also known as Bintang Toedjoeh in Malay, is an 1886 novel by Lie Kim Hok. It is considered the first Chinese Malay novel.

== Plot ==
In Canton, a baby girl is delivered to a group of seven male students who call themselves the "Seven Stars", during their meeting. They name the child Tjhit Seng Nio and agree to raise her together. Eight years later, after the group graduates, Seng Nio is enrolled in a school for girls. Her adoptive fathers find their own employment, but stay in contact. When Seng Nio turns 14, her guardians argue whether to either choose a husband for her, or let her find her own.

Meanwhile, one of Seng Nio's guardians, Tjin Hoe, is unintentionally swept up with the Cantonese rebels when he mistakenly believes that he is bankrupt. Though Tjin Hoe asks his father's friend Ong Thaj (real name: Thio Giok) to kill him, the latter is unwilling to do so and asks the leader of the rebellion, Lauw Seng, to do so. When Tjin Hoe realises that he is not bankrupt after all, he attempts to prevent his death, tracking Lauw Seng down to the Great Wall of China. The rebel leader captures Tjin Hoe and declares that the former student must die for being so willing to waste his life. He locks Tjin Hoe in a coffin and sends him to Shanghai by boat. There Ong Thaj reveals that the challenge was meant to make Tjin Hoe value his life better.

After her studies, Seng Nio is sent off to be a private teacher. Her student, Bwee Phek, falls in love with her, but as her family's history is not clear – and thus the possibility that she and Bwee Phek have the same family name cannot be ruled out – Seng Nio's guardians decide to send her to another school, to stop the blossoming romance. At the home of Sie Boen Tong, Seng Nio is mistreated and eventually kicked out of the house by Boen Tong's jealous wife. She finds shelter at a house belonging to Entjim Tjoene, who had helped her during her travels, only to find that it is a brothel. With the help of one of her guardians, Na Giam, she manages to leave, avoiding the forceful advances of the self-entitled womaniser Lauw Khok.

In another city, Seng Nio finds protection at the home of Goat Nio, a poor woman whose husband was captured by Taiping rebels. Seng Nio helps an old man, Thio Tian, who is stunned at her resemblance to his dead wife. When Seng Nio falls ill, he agrees to take her and Goat Nio to live at his house. Thio Tian, after a lengthy search, discovers that Seng Nio is his granddaughter, born of Goat Nio and Thio Giok. Finally, with Seng Nio's identity revealed, Thio Tan agrees to have her married to Bwee Phek. Although an upset Lauw Khok refuses to accept this, Seng Nio's guardians take him away so that he cannot bother her anymore; he dies soon afterwards.

== Writing ==
Tjhit Liap Seng was written by Lie Kim Hok (1853–1912), a Buitenzorg (today Bogor, Indonesia)-born ethnic Chinese writer. Schooled by missionaries, Lie was well-read in European literature, including the works of Dutch writers such as Anna Louisa Geertruida Bosboom-Toussaint and Jacob van Lennep, as well as works by French authors like Jules Verne, Alexandre Dumas and Pierre Alexis Ponson du Terrail. Lie had previously written a syair (a traditional Malay form of poetry), the four-volume Sair Tjerita Siti Akbari, in 1886; this book, dealing with a gender-disguised warrior who conquers the Sultanate of Hindustan to save her husband, became one of Lie's best-known works. Scholar of Chinese Malay literature Claudine Salmon considers Tjhit Liap Seng the first Chinese Malay novel.

In his 1958 biography of Lie, Tio Ie Soei revealed that the novel was an amalgamation of two European works: Jacob van Lennep's Klaasje Zevenster (1865) and Jules Verne's Les Tribulations d'un Chinois en Chine (1879). This was not the only work which Lie had adapted without giving attribution; Sair Tjerita Siti Akbari had been shown to be adapted from Syair Abdul Muluk a quarter of a century earlier. Lie was not the only contemporary ethnic Chinese writer who adapted European stories for audiences in the Indies; Thio Tjin Boen had drawn inspiration from La Dame aux camélias, by Alexandre Dumas, fils, in writing his Sie Tjaij Kim, whilst Chen Wen Zwan had drawn on Leo Tolstoy's Kreitzerova Sonata in writing his story Setan dan Amor.

Claudine Salmon, in her article "Aux origines du roman malais moderne: Tjhit Liap Seng ou les «Pléiades» de Lie Kim Hok (1886–87)", compares Tjhit Liap Seng with van Lennep and Verne's works. She finds numerous changes, including character names (Tjhin Hoe for Kin Fo, for instance) and the combination of two narratives. The most dramatic difference, she finds, is in the conclusion of the novels. In Klaasje Zevenster, Nicolette (Seng Nio in Tjhit Liap Seng) does not regain her status nor live a happy married life. Instead, she dies soon after marriage, still bearing a great degree of shame. Adaptations from Les Tribulations d'un Chinois en Chine are generally more similar to the original work, whereas adaptations from Klaasje Zevenster are more often than not abbreviated.

== Style ==
Unlike contemporary Indies works set in China, which were generally translations of Chinese literature, the chapters in Tjhit Liap Seng do not begin with two parallel lines summarising the chapter's contents. The end of the novel shows influences from detective stories.

== Publication ==
Tjhit Liap Seng was published between 1886 and 1887 over eight volumes, totally 500 pages in length.

In the foreword to the second printing of his 1927 novel Boenga Roos dari Tjikembang, the author Kwee Tek Hoay described Tjhit Liap Seng as an example of a high-quality work of Chinese Malay literature, one which was also commercially successful in its time.

== Works cited ==
- Koster, G. (1998). "Making it new in 1884; Lie Kim Hok's Syair Siti Akbari". Bijdragen tot de Taal-, Land- en Volkenkunde. 154 (1): 95–115. doi:10.1163/22134379-90003906.
- Kwee, Tek Hoay (1930). "Permoelaän Kata (Boeat Tjitakan Kadua)" [Foreword (For the Second Printing)]. Boenga Roos dari Tjikembang [The Rose of Tjikembang] (in Malay). Batavia: Panorama. pp. I–IV.
- Nio, Joe Lan (1962). Sastera Indonesia-Tionghoa [Indonesian-Chinese Literature] (in Indonesian). Jakarta: Gunung Agung. OCLC 3094508.
- Salmon, Claudine (1994). "Aux origines du roman malais moderne: Tjhit Liap Seng ou les "Pléiades" de Lie Kim Hok (1886–87)" [On the Origins of the Modern Malay Novel: Tjhit Liap Seng or the 'Pleiades' of Lie Kim Hok (1886–1887)]. Archipel (in French). 48 (48): 125–156. doi:10.3406/arch.1994.3006.
- Tio, Ie Soei (1958). Lie Kimhok 1853–1912 (in Indonesian). Bandung: Good Luck. OCLC 1069407.
- Zaini-Lajoubert, Monique (1994). "Le Syair Cerita Siti Akbari de Lie Kim Hok (1884) ou un avatar du Syair Abdul Muluk (1846)" [Syair Cerita Siti Akbari by Lie Kim Hok (1884), or an Adaptation of Syair Abdul Muluk (1846)]. Archipel (in French). 48 (48): 103–124. doi:10.3406/arch.1994.3005.
