= 1884 in literature =

This article contains information about the literary events and publications of 1884.

== Events ==
- January – Arthur Conan Doyle's anonymous story "J. Habakuk Jephson's Statement" appears in the Cornhill Magazine. It is inspired by the disappearance of the crew of the Mary Celeste in 1872.
- January 11 – Britain's poet laureate Alfred Tennyson is created 1st Baron Tennyson of Aldworth in the County of Sussex and of Freshwater, Isle of Wight, in the Peerage of the United Kingdom. Thus he becomes known as Alfred, Lord Tennyson.
- January 14 – Giovanni Verga's play Cavalleria rusticana, taken from his short story, is first performed, by Cesare Rossi's company at the Teatro Carignano in Turin, starring Eleonora Duse.
- February 1 – A New English Dictionary on Historical Principles, part 1 (covering A–Ant) appears in England, edited by James A. H. Murray, the first fascicle of what will become The Oxford English Dictionary.
- February 12 – Henry James visits the home of Alphonse Daudet and meets Goncourt, Émile Zola, François Coppée and others. In a discussion with Daudet, James describes the average Frenchman as "infinitely sharper in his observation than the average Englishman or American."
- February 18 – The English Jesuit poet Gerard Manley Hopkins becomes Professor of Greek and Latin at University College Dublin in Ireland, where he will remain until his death in 1889 and write (but not publish) his innovative sonnets and other poems.
- May 29 – Oscar Wilde marries Constance Mary Lloyd (1858–1898), a Protestant Dubliner, at St James's Church, Paddington, London.
- June 25 – Hallam Tennyson, son of the poet laureate, marries Audrey Boyle, a granddaughter of Sir Lorenzo Moore and great-granddaughter of Edmund Boyle, 7th Earl of Cork.
- September 27 – August Strindberg's short stories Getting Married (Giftas) are published in Sweden. A week later, the author is prosecuted for blasphemy, but will be acquitted on November 17.
- December 10 – The first London publication of Mark Twain's Adventures of Huckleberry Finn occurs.

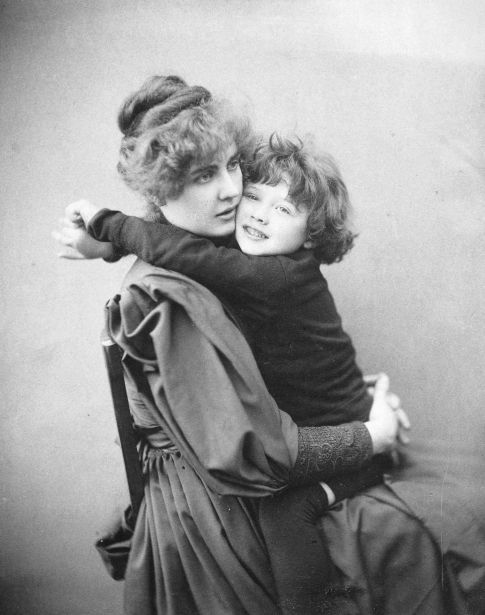
Constance Wilde with her son Cyril Holland in 1889

- Uncertain dates
  - Lie Kim Hok's collection of children's stories Sobat Anak-anak is published in Buitenzorg, the first work of popular literature in the Dutch East Indies. His Malay language syair (poem) Sair Tjerita Siti Akbari is also first published.
  - The first translation of Shakespeare's plays in Japan is made, an adaptation of Julius Caesar by Tsubouchi Shōyō as a Bunraku puppet play, entitled The Strange Case of Caesar: the renowned sharpness of the blade of liberty.

== New books ==
=== Fiction ===
- Edwin Abbott Abbott – Flatland
- Émile Zola – "La Joie De Vivre (The Joy of Living)"
- Henry Brooks Adams – Esther
- Juhani Aho – Rautatie
- Leopoldo Alas (Clarín) – La regenta, vol. 1
- Aluísio de Azevedo – Casa de Pensão
- Jules Barbey d'Aurevilly – What Never Dies
- R. D. Blackmore – Tommy Upmore
- Mary Elizabeth Braddon – Ishmael. A Novel
- Bankim Chandra Chatterji – Devi Chaudhurani
- Wilkie Collins – I Say No
- Alphonse Daudet – Sapho
- Amy Dillwyn – Jill
- Henry James – Georgina's Reasons (novella)
- J.-K. Huysmans
  - À rebours
  - Controcorrente
- Helen Hunt Jackson – Ramona
- Vernon Lee – Miss Brown
- George A. Moore – A Mummer's Wife
- Mrs. Oliphant
  - The Ladies Lindores
  - The Wizard's Son
- Mark Twain – Adventures of Huckleberry Finn
- Rachilde – Monsieur Vénus
- Jules Verne
  - The Archipelago on Fire (L'Archipel en feu)
  - The Vanished Diamond (L'Étoile du sud)
- Mary Augusta Ward – Miss Bretherton

=== Drama ===
- Henrik Ibsen – The Wild Duck (Vildanden) (published)
- Alfred Tennyson – Becket
- Giovanni Verga – Cavalleria rusticana
- Friedrich Theodor Vischer – Nicht Ia: Schwäbisches Lustspiel in drei Aufzügen

=== Poetry ===
- Lie Kim Hok – Sair Tjerita Siti Akbari
- Rabindranath Tagore – Bhanusimha Thakurer Padabali
- William Watson – Epigrams of Art, Life and Nature

=== Non-fiction ===
- Friedrich Engels – The Origin of the Family, Private Property, and the State (Der Ursprung der Familie, des Privateigenthums und des Staats)
- The Herefordshire Pomona
- Henry James – A Little Tour in France
- Sophia Jex-Blake – The Care of Infants: A Manual for Mothers and Nurses
- James K. Jones – The Tariff
- Vernon Lee
  - The Countess of Albany
  - Euphorion: Being Studies of the Antique and the Mediæval in the Renaissance
- George Fletcher Moore – Diary of Ten Years Eventful Life of an Early Settler in Western Australia
- Elizabeth Robins Pennell – Mary Wollstonecraft Godwin (Eminent Women series)
- Arnold Toynbee (died 1883) – Lectures on the Industrial Revolution in England

== Births ==
- January 2 – Oscar Micheaux, African American author and filmmaker (died 1951)
- January 18 – Arthur Ransome, English author of children's and other books (died 1967)
- March 13 – Sir Hugh Walpole, New Zealand-born novelist (died 1941)
- April 1 – J. C. Squire, English writer and critic (died 1958)
- April 3 – Nicos Nicolaides, Greek Cypriot writer (died 1956)
- May 21 – Manuel Pérez y Curis, Uruguayan poet (died 1920)
- June 5 – Ivy Compton-Burnett, English novelist (died 1969)
- June 13 – Lillian Barrett, American novelist and playwright (died 1963)
- June 29 – Francis Brett Young, English novelist and poet (died 1954)
- August 8 – Sara Teasdale, American poet (died 1933)
- August 10 – Panait Istrati, Romanian novelist, short story writer and political essayist (died 1935)
- August 12 – Frank Swinnerton, English novelist (died 1982)
- August 24 – Earl Derr Biggers, American writer (died 1933)
- September 20 – Maxwell Perkins, American literary editor (died 1947)
- December 6 – Otto Roth, Hungarian Romanian politician, journalist, and literary promoter (died 1956)
- December 17 – Alison Uttley, English writer of children's books (died 1976)
- unknown date – Mourning Dove (Christal Quintasket or Hum-isha-ma), Native American writer (died 1936)

== Deaths ==
- January 3 – William Billington, English poet and publican (born 1825)
- January 7 – John Harris, English poet (born 1820)
- January 11 – Hermann Ulrici, German philosopher (born 1806)
- February 2 – Abraham Hayward, English man of letters (born 1801)
- February 11 – Thomas Chenery, Barbadian-born English scholar and editor (born 1826)
- March 10 – William Blanchard Jerrold, English journalist (born 1826)
- March 13 – Richard Henry Horne, English poet, critic and journalist, and public official in Australia (born 1802)
- March 24 – François Mignet, French historian (born 1796)
- April 6 – Emanuel Geibel, German poet (born 1815)
- April 7 – Maria Doolaeghe, Flemish novelist (born 1803)
- April 11 – Charles Reade, English novelist (born 1814)
- May 27 – Caroline Dexter, English-born Australian feminist writer (born 1819)
- May 28 – Joseph d'Haussonville, French historian (born 1809)
- June 10 – Johann Gustav Droysen, German historian (born 1808)
- June 27 – Andreas Munch, Norwegian poet (born 1811)
- July 23 – Anna Mary Howitt, English writer, painter and feminist (born 1822)
- September 18 – Boleslav Markevich, Russian novelist, essayist and critic (born 1922)
- October 16 – Paul Lacroix, French novelist and journalist (born 1806)
- October 19 – Karl Hillebrand, German literary historian and philosopher (born 1829)
- November 3 – František Doucha, Czech translator (born 1810)
- November 6 – William Wells Brown, African-American writer (born 1814)
- December 3 – Jane C. Bonar, Scottish hymnwriter (born 1821)

== Awards ==
- Gaisford Prize – Harry Hammond House (Corpus Christi) for iambics
