= Sair Tjerita Siti Akbari =

1884 syair (poem) by Lie Kim Hok

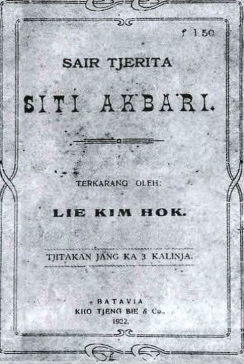
- Third printing, 1922
- Author: Lie Kim Hok
- Language: Malay
- Genre: Syair
- Publisher: W. Bruining & Co.
- Publication date: 1884
- Publication place: Dutch East Indies
- Pages: 200
- OCLC: 318099218

Sair Tjerita Siti Akbari ([ʃaˈir tʃeˈrita siˈti akˈbari]; Perfected spelling: Syair Cerita Siti Akbari, Malay for Poem on the Story of Siti Akbari; also known as Siti Akbari (Note: For this article, the short title Siti Akbari is used)) is an 1884 Malay-language syair (poem) by Lie Kim Hok. Adapted indirectly from the Sjair Abdoel Moeloek, it tells of a woman who passes as a man to free her husband from the Sultan of Hindustan, who had captured him in an assault on their kingdom.

Written over a period of several years and influenced by European literature, Siti Akbari differs from earlier syairs in its use of suspense and emphasis on prose rather than form. It also incorporates European realist views to expand upon the genre, although it maintains several of the hallmarks of traditional syairs. Critical views have emphasised various aspects of its story, finding in the work an increased empathy for women's thoughts and feelings, a call for a unifying language in the Dutch East Indies (now Indonesia), and a polemic regarding the relation between tradition and modernity.

Siti Akbari was a commercial and critical success, seeing two reprints and a film adaptation in 1940. When Sjair Abdoel Moeloek's influence became clear in the 1920s, Lie was criticised as unoriginal. However, Siti Akbari remains one of the better known syairs written by an ethnic Chinese author. Lie was later styled as the "father of Chinese Malay literature".

== Plot ==
The Sultan of Hindustan, Bahar Oedin, is infuriated after his uncle Safi, a trader, dies while imprisoned in Barbari. As the Abdul Aidid, the Sultan of Barbari, has greater military power, Bahar Oedin bides his time and plans his revenge. Meanwhile, Abdul Aidid's son Abdul Moelan marries his cousin, Siti Bida Undara. Two years later, after Abdul Aidid dies, Abdul Moelan goes on an extended sea voyage, leaving his wife behind.

In the nearby kingdom of Ban, Abdul Moelan meets and falls in love with Siti Akbari, daughter of the Sultan of Ban. The two soon marry and, after six months in Ban, return to Barbari. Siti Bida Undara, at first upset at the thought of sharing her husband, soon becomes close friends with Siti Akbari. Shortly thereafter Bahar Oedin takes his revenge, capturing Abdul Moelan and Siti Bida Undara. When the sultan tries to capture Siti Akbari, he discovers a body in her room and believes it to be hers. He takes his captives back to Hindustan and imprisons them.

Unknown to him, the pregnant Siti Akbari has faked her death and escaped. After several months she finds protection under Syaikh (Sheikh) Khidmatullah, under whose protection she gives birth. He trains her in silat (traditional martial arts) so she can free her husband. Leaving her son in Khidmatullah's care, she begins her travels. When seven men accost and attempt to rape her, she kills them. Taking their clothes and cutting her hair, she disguises herself as a man and takes the name Bahara. After arriving in Barbam, she stops a war between two claimants to the region's throne. She kills the usurper, then takes his head to the rightful heir to the throne, Hamid Lauda. In thanks Hamid Lauda rewards Siti Akbari with rule over Barbam and allows the "Bahara" to take his sister, Siti Abian, in marriage.

Siti Akbari, keeping her disguise as Bahara, leaves Barbam to go to Hindustan and recover her husband. With the help of two advisors who have found the Sultan's disfavour, she is able to reconnoitre the area. She eventually captures Hindustan with her army, conquering the sultanate on her own, killing Bahar Oedin, and freeing Abdul Moelan and Siti Bida Undara. While still disguised, Siti Akbari repudiates Siti Abian and gives her to Abdul Moelan before revealing her true identity. The different kingdoms are then divided amongst the male protagonists, while Siti Akbari returns to her role as a wife. (Note: Derived from the synopses by Koster (1998, pp. 97–98) and Benitez (2004, pp. 209–212))

== Background and writing ==
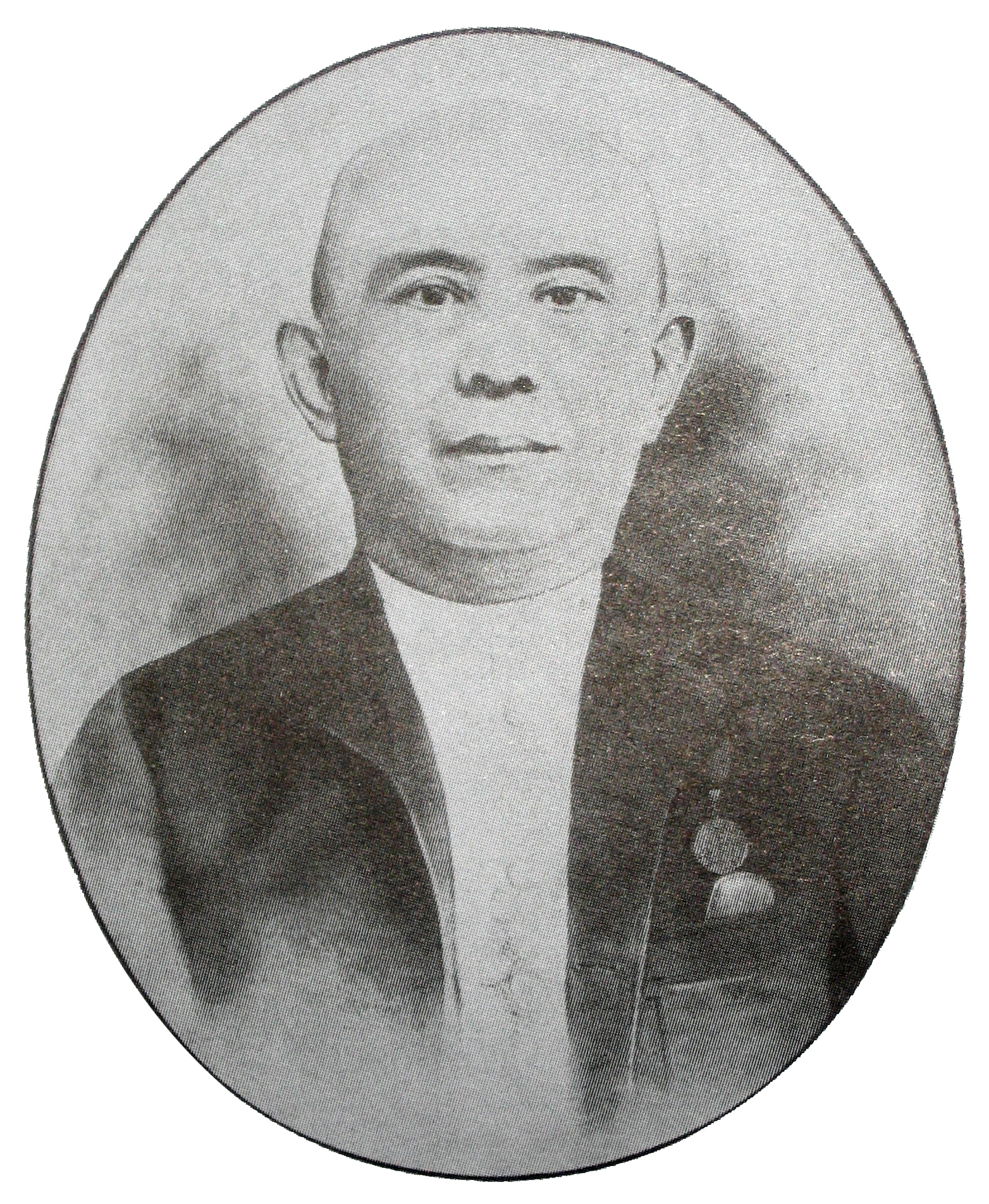
Lie Kim Hok, author of Siti Akbari

Siti Akbari was written by Lie Kim Hok, a Bogor-born peranakan Chinese who was taught by Dutch missionaries. The missionaries introduced him to European literature, including the works of Dutch writers such as Anna Louisa Geertruida Bosboom-Toussaint and Jacob van Lennep, as well as works by French authors like Jules Verne, Alexandre Dumas, and Pierre Alexis Ponson du Terrail. In his doctoral thesis, J. Francisco B. Benitez suggests that Lie may have also been influenced by Malay and Javanese oral traditions, such as the travelling bangsawan theatrical troupes or wayang puppets.

Evidence uncovered after Lie's death in 1912 suggested that Siti Akbari was heavily influenced by the earlier Sjair Abdoel Moeloek (1847), variously credited to Raja Ali Haji or Saleha. This tale was transliterated by Arnold Snackey, then later translated into Sundanese. Sources disagree on the translator. The documentarian Christiaan Hooykaas, writing in a letter to literary critic Nio Joe Lan, suggested that Lie's inspiration had come from a version of Sjair Abdoel Moeloek held in the Royal Batavian Society of Arts and Sciences Library in Batavia. Biographer Tio Ie Soei, meanwhile, suggested that the version which inspired Lie was translated in 1873 by Lie's teacher, Sierk Coolsma. According to Tio, Coolsma had based his translation off a stage performance and written it hurriedly, such that it was nearly illegible. As he had better handwriting, Lie purportedly copied the story for Coolsma and kept the original in his own collection. The literary historian Monique Zaini-Lajoubert writes that none of these intermediary versions has been found.

Work on Siti Akbari was completed over a period of several years. Lie stated that the story had taken him three years, writing sporadically. Tio, however, reports rumours that the writing took some seven years, with Lie sometimes taking long breaks and sometimes writing in a fervor, writing from dawn until dusk.

== Style ==
The literary critic G. Koster writes that, when writing Siti Akbari, Lie Kim Hok was limited by the formulaic Pandji romances and syair poems common in Malay literature at the time. Koster notes basic structural similarities between Siti Akbari and the existing poetic forms. The work followed the archetype of a hero or heroine going from a lawful kingdom into exile then into a chaotic kingdom, one which Koster suggests is representative of the cycle of oral law. Such an archetype and formulas were used in contemporary works such as Syair Siti Zubaidah Perang Cina (Poem on Siti Zubaidah and the War against China). The plot device of a woman passing herself as a man to do war was likewise common in Malay and Javanese literature. Lie deviated greatly from the established traditions, mixing European and native literary influences.

The story consists of 1,594 monorhymic quatrains divided into two couplets, with each couplet consisting of two lines, and each line consisting of two half-lines separated by a caesura. Most of these lines are complete syntactic units, either clauses or sentences. Koster notes that the form is freer than in more traditional works, and as a result it becomes a sort of prose poem. An unnamed narrator tells the story from a third-person omniscient perspective; unlike most contemporary works, the narrator "assumes authority on his own account" by putting himself and his ideas forth, rather than acting as an uninvolved party.

Siti Akbari differs from contemporary works by introducing a feeling of suspense. Koster gives the identity of the Hindustani trader as an example: the man's identity as the uncle of the Sultan is not revealed until after it is convenient for the story. Koster describes the period in which a reader believes Siti Akbari to be dead, which spans several pages, as the work's most remarkable break from tradition. He notes that unlike most contemporary works, the syair begins with a quote, rather than an invocation to Allah. This quote is eventually shown as a fulfilled prophecy:

Faedahnja hoedjan ini, Toewankoe sri Baginda
Melainkan bri satoe alamat, atawa soewatoe tanda,
Satoe hal amat adjaib, satoe hal jang tida tida,
Lantaran sang Poetri, nanti menjadi ada

Translation:

The purpose of this rain, My Lord
is as an omen, a sign
that something miraculous, something incredible
because of your daughter, will be.

Koster sees effects of realism, especially the idealistic realism held at the time in the Netherlands, in the work. He notes that motives and causality are given more weight in the narrative than in most contemporary works. He observes that this is also reflected in the characters, who – although royalty and holy men – were given the traits of persons one could find in real-life Batavia (now Jakarta). The use of punctuation, another trait uncommon in the local literature of the time, may also have served to give a more realistic reading and reflected the work's origin as a written manuscript and not from oral literature. Tio Ie Soei described the work's rhythm as more akin to speech than song.

== Themes ==
Benitez writes that the market in Siti Akbari "provides possibilities for exchange and connections" between persons of all cultures and backgrounds, connecting them. He describes this a representation of the heteroglossia offered by bazaar Malay, which had originated in the markets. As Lie also wrote a grammar of bazaar Malay, Benitez suggests that Lie may have hoped for the dialect to become a lingua franca in the Dutch East Indies.

Benitez considers the poem to highlight the tensions between the "monadic and autonomous subjectivity" of European culture and the "social subjectivity" of adat, or tradition, with the character of Siti Akbari "a site of instability that makes manifest both the possibilities of social transformation, as well as the anxiety over the possibility of social reproduction gone awry". As an individual, she is able to fight her enemies and reclaim her husband. Ultimately, however, she chooses to return to her polygamous relationship with Abdul Moelan, an affirmation of tradition over modernism. In opposition to Siti Akbari, the trader Safi Oedin refuses to live in accordance with the local customs while he is in a foreign land and ultimately dies. Benitez writes that this "may be read as a warning to those who refuse to live in accordance with local adat." Koster notes that – as usual with syairs – Siti Akbari works to increase awareness of adat and traditional value systems.

Zaini-Lajoubert opines that the story promotes a treatment of women as persons with feelings and opinions, as opposed to the patriarchial view common during the period that women were unfeeling objects. She finds that the story's female characters feel grief and joy, quoting several passages, including one where Siti Akbari confesses that she felt she had waited "dozens of years" (Note: Original: "... belasan tahon...") for Abdul Moelan. Zaini-Lajoubert notes that the female characters are not all of the same opinion: although Siti Akbari was willing to enter a polygamous relationship, Siti Bida Undara had to be coaxed. Ultimately, however, she finds that Siti Akbari conveys the message that women should be faithful and obedient to their husbands.

== Reception and legacy ==
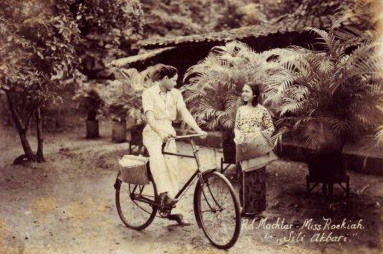
A promotional still from the film Siti Akbari (1940)

Siti Akbari was first published in four volumes in 1884. It proved to be Lie's most popular work, and received the most reprints out of any of his publications. The first reprinting was in 1913 by Hoa Siang In Kiok, and the second was in 1922 by Kho Tjeng Bie. Both of these new printings consisted of a single volume, and, according to Tio, contained numerous inaccuracies.

The story was well received by readers, and although Lie was not the only ethnic Chinese to write in the traditionally Malay poetry form of syair, he became one of the more accomplished. Lie considered it amongst his best works. Writing in 1923, Kwee Tek Hoay – himself a proficient author – wrote that he had been fascinated by the story as a child, to the point he had "memorised more than half of its contents by heart". (Note: Original: "... separoh dari isinja saja soedah fahamken di loewar kapala.") Kwee considered it "full of good maxims and advice" (Note: Original: "... banjak berisi oedjar pepatah dan nasehat jang begitoe bagoes ...") unavailable elsewhere. Nio Joe Lan described it as the "jewel of Chinese Malay poetry", (Note: Original: "Ratna manikam dalam persadjakan Melaju-Tionghoa...") of far higher quality than other Chinese-written Malay poems – both contemporary and subsequent.

The story was adapted for the stage soon after publication, when it was performed by a group named Siti Akbari under Lie's leadership. Lie also made a simplified version for a troupe of teenaged actors, whom he led in Bogor. In 1922 the Sukabumi branch of the Shiong Tih Hui published another stage adaptation under the title Pembalesan Siti Akbari (Revenge of Siti Akbari); by 1926 it was being performed by Miss Riboet's Orion, a theatrical troupe led by Tio Tek Djien. (Note: This adaptation was reprinted by the Lontar Foundation in 2006 using the Perfected Spelling System (Lontar Foundation 2006, p. 155).) The story remained popular well into the late 1930s. It likely inspired Joshua and Othniel Wong's 1940 film Siti Akbari, starring Roekiah and Rd. Mochtar. The extent of this influence is uncertain, and the film is likely lost.

Lie continued experimenting with European-style prose. In 1886, he published Tjhit Liap Seng (Seven Stars), which Claudine Salmon of the School for Advanced Studies in the Social Sciences describes as the first Chinese Malay novel. Lie went on to publish another four novels, as well as several translations. When ethnic Chinese writers became common in the early 1900s, critics named Lie the "father of Chinese Malay literature" for his contributions, including Siti Akbari and Tjhit Liap Seng.

After the rise of the nationalist movement and the Dutch colonial government's efforts to use Balai Pustaka to publish literary works for native consumption, the work began to be marginalised. The Dutch colonial government used Court Malay as a "language of administration", a language for everyday dealings, while the Indonesian nationalists appropriated the language to help build a national culture. Chinese Malay literature, written in "low" Malay, was steadily marginalised. Benitez writes that, as a result, there has been little scholarly analysis of Siti Akbari. Despite this, sinologist Leo Suryadinata wrote in 1993 that Siti Akbari has remained one of the best-known syairs written by an ethnic Chinese.

== Criticism ==
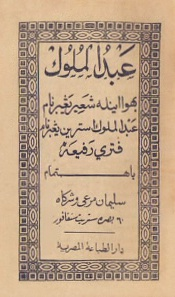
Lie borrowed heavily from Sjair Abdoel Moeloek.

Although both Sjair Abdoel Moeloek and Siti Akbari were often performed on stage, the similarities between the two were not discovered for several years. Zaini-Lajoubert writes that Tio Ie Soei uncovered these similarities while working as a journalist for the Chinese Malay newspaper Lay Po in 1923. Kwee Tek Hoay followed this article with another discussion of the work's origins in 1925. Later writers criticised Lie's other works as blatant adaptations. Tan Soey Bing and Tan Oen Tjeng, for instance, wrote that none of his works were original. Tio Ie Soei, in response, stated that Lie had changed the stories he had adapted, and thus shown originality.

In exploring the similarities between Sjair Abdoel Moeloek and Siti Akbari, Zaini-Lajoubert notes that the names of the individual kingdoms, save Barham (Barbam in Siti Akbari), are taken directly from the earlier work. Names of characters, such as Abdul Muluk (in Siti Akbari, Abdul Moelan) and Siti Rapiah (Siti Akbari), are simply replaced, although some minor characters are present in one story and not the other. The main plot elements in both stories are the same; some elements, such as the birth and childhood of Abdul Muluk and the later adventures of Siti Rapiah's son, are present in one story and not the other – or given more detail. The two differ greatly in their styles, especially Lie's emphasis on description and realism.
