= Phoa Keng Hek =

Indonesian social worker, community leader (1857–1937)

Phoa Keng Hek Sia
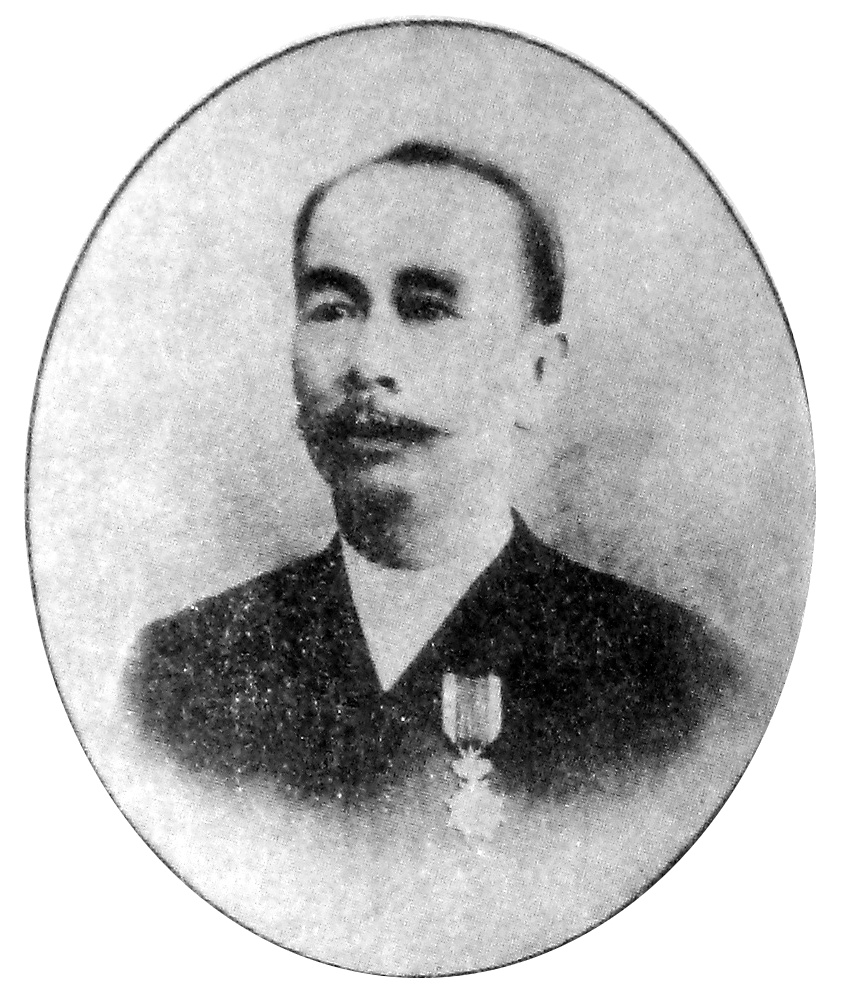
- Phoa Keng Hek Sia
- Born: 1857; Buitenzorg, West Java, Dutch East Indies
- Died: 1937 (aged 79–80); Batavia, Dutch East Indies
- Occupations: Social worker, Landheer
- Relatives: Majoor Khouw Kim An (son-in-law); Phoa Liong Gie (great-nephew); Thung Sin Nio (cousin)
- Awards: Ridder in de Orde van Oranje-Nassau; Groote Gouden Ster voor Trouw en Verdienste

Phoa Keng Hek Sia (Chinese: 潘景赫舍; Pe̍h-ōe-jī: Phoaⁿ Keng-hek Sià; pinyin: Pān Jǐnghè Shè; 1857–1937) was a Chinese Indonesian Landheer (landlord), social activist and founding president of Tiong Hoa Hwe Koan, an influential Confucian educational and social organisation meant to better the position of ethnic Chinese in the Dutch East Indies (now Indonesia). He was also one of the founders of Institut Teknologi Bandung.

== Biography ==
=== Early life and family background ===
Phoa was born in Buitenzorg (now Bogor), Dutch East Indies (now Indonesia), in 1857 into an influential Peranakan Chinese family, part of the Cabang Atas or the Chinese gentry of colonial Indonesia. His father, Phoa Tjeng Tjoan, held the post of Kapitein der Chinezen of Buitenzorg from 1866 until 1878. This was a civil government position in the Dutch colonial administration with legal and political jurisdiction over the local Chinese community. His mother, Thung Tiauw Nio, was the daughter and elder sister of prominent community leaders in Buitenzorg, Thung Tiang Mih and Thung Ho Boen respectively. As the son of a Chinese officer, the younger Phoa held the hereditary title of Sia. His maternal cousin was the Dutch-Indonesian suffragist Thung Sin Nio (1902–1996), while his paternal great-nephew, Phoa Liong Gie (1904–1983), would later attain prominence as a jurist, politician and newspaper owner.

Phoa's earliest formal education was in a school run by ethnic Chinese, but after Sierk Coolsma opened a missionary school in Bogor on 31 May 1869, Phoa was in the first class of ten. Among his classmates was Lie Kim Hok, who would later become known as a writer. At this school Phoa studied, among other subjects, Dutch. Although the school was meant to convert people to Christianity, Phoa remained well-versed in Confucianism.

After graduating Phoa married Tan Soei Nio, like him a scion of the Cabang Atas as the middle daughter of Tan Kong Hoa, Luitenant der Chinezen of Batavia (now Jakarta) and Nie Po Nio. To be with his wife, Phoa moved to Batavia, the capital of the Indies, where his father-in-law sat on the city's Kong Koan or Chinese Council. The couple's only child – a daughter named Phoa Tji Nio – went on to marry Khouw Kim An, the 5th and last Majoor der Chinezen of Batavia.

=== Community leader, THHK and Landheer ===
Phoa proved very outspoken and, partly thanks to his own and his wife's family background, soon came to be viewed as a leader of Batavia's Chinese community. Because he had a command of Dutch, used by the colonial forces, Phoa was able to easily interact outside of Chinese and indigenous groups.

In 1900 Phoa, together with his former classmate Lie, was an establishing member of the Tiong Hoa Hwe Koan (THHK), a modernizing Confucian organization. THHK aimed to purify the practice of Confucianism in the Indies, and ran a network of around 130 schools to promote a modern education for the colony's ethnic Chinese community. He served as the President of THHK for twenty-three years before retiring, and was assisted by the philanthropist (and his son-in-law's cousin) Oen Giok Khouw, as vice-president. The organisation promoted rights for ethnic Chinese and the use of Chinese and English amongst ethnic Chinese. In 1907, Phoa – under the pseudonym "Hoa Djien" ("A Chinese") – used a series of letters to the editor of the daily Perniagaan to criticise the Dutch colonial government and its policies towards the ethnic Chinese. He wrote that the Indies offered little opportunity to ethnic Chinese, who should instead look abroad. He wrote "if they are literate in Chinese and English, they can just take a two- or three-day voyage (Java-Singapore) into a wider world where they can move freely."

The modernizing spirit of THHK, however, was in due course co-opted by the Dutch colonial authorities. When Tio Tek Ho, the 4th Majoor der Chinezen of Batavia, resigned in 1907, the colonial government offered Phoa the capital city's Chinese mayoralty – the highest government position open to a Chinese subject in the Indies. Phoa turned down the offer, but recommended his son-in-law Luitenant Khouw Kim An for the post since they both shared the new, modernizing outlook of the THHK. In line with established custom, Phoa's son-in-law was raised to the post of Kapitein der Chinezen prior to his inauguration as the fifth and last Majoor der Chinezen of Batavia in 1908.

Despite eschewing official involvement in the colonial bureaucracy, Phoa remained an important community leader with a concern for education. Together with the politician H. H. Kan and the bureaucrat Kapitein Nio Hoei Oen, Phoa was part of the committee that raised 500,000 gulden towards the establishment of the Technische Hoogeschool te Bandoeng (today Institut Teknologi Bandung), which was founded in 1920 and is now one of Indonesia's oldest universities).

Outside of his community leadership role, like many members of his family, Phoa was an active Landheer or landlord. He bought the particuliere land or private domain of Teloek Poetjoeng, south-east of Batavia, now part of Bekasi. With a paternalist concern for the moral well-being of the inhabitants of his domains in mind, Phoa succeeded 1903 in banning gambling in the area. Like other Landheeren, Phoa grew and sold agricultural products. He owned a rice mill and tea factory on his domains.

Queen Wilhelmina of the Netherlands conferred the Groote Gouden Ster, the highest rank in the Ster voor Trouw en Verdienste on Phoa for his social work. Phoa was also invested as a Knight of the Order of Orange-Nassau in 1937. He died in Batavia later that year, on 19 July, and was buried after a large funeral at Petamburan Cemetery on 25 July. As he had no male issue, one of his daughter's sons by Majoor Khouw Kim An, Phoa Liong Djin, assumed his maternal grandfather's surname and succeeded Phoa as head of his lineage.

== Works cited ==
- Adam, Ahmat (1995). The Vernacular Press and the Emergence of Modern Indonesian Consciousness (1855–1913). Studies on Southeast Asia. Vol. 17. Ithaca: Cornell University Press. ISBN 978-0-87727-716-3.
- "Familiebericht" [Family News]. Het nieuws van den dag voor Nederlandsch-Indië (in Dutch). No. 165. 22 July 1937. p. 4 – via Delpher.nl.
- Lohanda, Mona (1996). The Kapitan Cina of Batavia, 1837-1942: A History of Chinese Establishment in Colonial Society. Jakarta: Djambatan. ISBN 979428257X.
- Nio, Joe Lan (1940). Riwajat 40 Taon dari Tiong Hoa Hwee Koan — Batavia (1900–1939) [The History of Forty Years of Tiong Hoa Hwee Koan — Batavia (1900–1939)]. Batavia: Tiong Hoa Hwee Koan.
- "Phoa Keng Hek †. De Laatste Eer" [Phoa Keng Hek †. Their Last Respects.]. De Indische Courant (in Dutch). Surabaya. 26 July 1937. p. 1 – via Delpher.nl.
- Setyautama, Sam; Mihardja, Suma (2008). Tokoh-tokoh Etnis Tionghoa di Indonesia [Ethnic Chinese Figures in Indonesia] (in Indonesian). Jakarta: Gramedia. ISBN 978-979-9101-25-9.
- Sidharta, Myra (2003). "The Role of the Go-Between in Chinese Marriages in Batavia". In Blussé, Leonard; Chen, Menghong (eds.). The Archives of the Kong Koan of Batavia. Leiden: Brill. ISBN 9004131574.
- Suryadinata, Leo (1995). Prominent Indonesian Chinese: Biographical Sketches. Singapore: Institute of Southeast Asian Studies. ISBN 978-981-3055-04-9.
- Suryadinata, Leo, ed. (1997). Political Thinking of the Indonesian Chinese: 1900-1977; a Sourcebook. Singapore: Institute of Southeast Asian Studies. ISBN 978-9971-69-201-8.
- Tio, Ie Soei (1958). Lie Kimhok 1853–1912 (in Indonesian). Bandung: Good Luck. OCLC 1069407.
