= Thung Sin Nio =

Dutch East Indies teacher and women's rights activist (1902–1996)

Betsy Thung Sin Nio
- 汤新娘
- Thung, circa 1930s
- Born: 22 May 1902; Batavia, Dutch East Indies, Kingdom of the Netherlands
- Died: 5 January 1996 (aged 93); Eindhoven, Netherlands
- Education: Nederlandsche Handels-Hoogeschool
- Occupations: Women's rights activist, physician, economist, politician, translator and teacher
- Years active: 1930–1974
- Relatives: Phoa Keng Hek (cousin); Tan Sin Hok (cousin)

Betsy Thung Sin Nio (Chinese: 汤新娘; Pe̍h-ōe-jī: Thng Sin-niû; pinyin: Tāng Xīnniáng; 22 May 1902 – 5 January 1996) was an Indonesian-Dutch women's rights activist, physician, economist and politician. Born into a wealthy and progressive Peranakan family of the Cabang Atas gentry in Batavia, she was encouraged to obtain an education, which was unusual for Indonesian women at the time. After completing high school, she qualified as a bookkeeper, but – because social norms prevented women from doing office work – she became a teacher. After teaching briefly in an elementary school, in 1924 Thung enrolled at the Netherlands School of Business in Rotterdam to study economics. On graduating, she went on to earn a master's degree and a doctorate in economics. In 1932, she enrolled at the University of Amsterdam to pursue her medical studies.

During her schooling in the Netherlands, Thung met Aletta Jacobs who encouraged her to become involved in the Dutch women's movement and the Association for Women's Interests and Equal Citizenship. She became an activist for improved socio-economic and civil status of women, writing articles for feminist journals in both the Netherlands and the Dutch East Indies. After completing her degree in 1938, Thung returned to Batavia and opened a medical practice focusing on the health needs of women and children. She continued her feminist involvement and fought for women's suffrage. When the government proposed only European women be given the vote and the right to stand in elections, she campaigned successfully to secure voting rights for educated women regardless of their race.

During World War II, Thung continued her private practice, volunteered at a local public hospital and opened a private hospital to treat European patients. When the war ended, she became a medical officer for the school system in Jakarta and entered local politics. She was elected as the first woman member of the Municipal Council of Jakarta in 1949, representing the Persatuan Tionghoa. From 1949 to 1965, she traveled abroad on numerous occasions on behalf of her country. She served as a translator for trade delegations and as an economist on fact-finding missions to Russia and China. Following the 1965 Indonesian coup d'état and the turn away from communism, she was released from government work. In 1968, when assimilationist policies were introduced to force Chinese citizens to take Indonesian names, Thung permanently immigrated to the Netherlands, where she continued to work as a physician. She formally sought naturalization in 1972 and in 1983 was knighted in the Order of Orange-Nassau. She is remembered in China, Indonesia and the Netherlands for her social activism on behalf of women and children.

== Early life ==
Thung Sin Nio was born on 22 May 1902 in Batavia, Dutch East Indies, to the landowner and community leader Thung Bouw Kiat (1863–1916) and his wife, Tan Toan Nio (1865–1919), into a family of the Cabang Atas gentry, originally from Buitenzorg (now Bogor), a hill station in West Java. Her father, Thung Bouw Kiat, was the elder brother of Thung Tjoen Ho, Luitenant der Chinezen of Buitenzorg from 1895 until 1911; a nephew by marriage of Phoa Tjeng Tjoan, Kapitein der Chinezen of Buitenzorg from 1866 until 1878; and a maternal great-grandnephew of Tan Oe Ko, Kapitein der Chinezen of Buitenzorg from 1829 until 1860. The Chinese officership, consisting of the ranks of Luitenant, Kapitein and Majoor der Chinezen, was a high-ranking government position in the civil bureaucracy of the Dutch East Indies, part of the colony's system of indirect rule. Thung's paternal family had migrated to West Java from the Hua'an County of Fujian, China, at the start of the nineteenth century; while her paternal grandmother's Tan lineage went back to the Chinese scholar-gentry of the fourteenth century, and had been established as community leaders in West Java since the eighteenth century.

Thung's mother, Tan Toan Nio, was an elder sister of the rice mill owner Tan Kiat Tjay and the bureaucrat Tan Kiat Goan, Luitenant der Chinezen of Tjilakoe, West Java. Through her maternal uncle Tan Kiat Tjay, Thung was a first cousin of the paleontologist Tan Sin Hok (1902–1945), to whom she was engaged for a time by prior family arrangement.

Thung's father managed a plantation and sat for several years as a member of the Gemeenteraad (Municipal Council) of Batavia, a body to which Thung would also be elected in time. Belonging to one of the 10 wealthiest, Chinese-Indonesian families, her progressive parents encouraged their daughter to study, which – though unusual in the general community at the time – reflected a trend for westernized modernity among the Cabang Atas. Members of her extended family had been pioneers and promoters of higher education, including her father's first cousin, the prominent social activist Phoa Keng Hek (1857–1937, son of Kapitein Phoa Tjeng Tjoan); and their distant cousin, the colony's first university-educated, Chinese-Indonesian engineer, Ir. Tan Tjoen Liang (1862–1923, like Thung's father, another great-grandnephew of Kapitein Tan Oe Ko).

Her privileged and progressive background allowed her to attend Dutch-medium schools, including Prins Hendrik School, where she passed her final examinations in 1918. As a woman, with few options to continue her education, she qualified as a bookkeeper at the Handelsschool (business school) in 1920. That year, her mother died, and as her father had died in 1916, she went to live in western Java in Cianjur with an aunt. Though she had a degree, a woman of her social class was not allowed to do office work. Instead, she spent her time sewing, cooking, reading and occasionally being allowed to go out under the supervision of a chaperone.

Unsatisfied, Thung returned to school 1922, studying in Jatinegara at the Hollandsch Chineesche Kweekschool (Dutch-Chinese Teachers' College). She earned a teaching certificate in 1924 and then taught briefly at the private Hollandsch Chineesche School (Dutch Elementary School for the Chinese) of Bogor. Wanting to continue her education, Thung decided to go abroad and enrolled at the Nederlandsche Handels-Hoogeschool (Netherlands School of Business), on 15 October 1924, where she studied economics with Willemijn Posthumus-van der Goot. For her birthday in 1926, fellow students gave her a copy of Herinneringen (Memories) by Aletta Jacobs. After writing to the author to express her enthusiasm, Thung was invited to visit Jacobs, who introduced her to Kee Groot and other feminists. She joined the Vereniging voor Vrouwenbelangen en Gelijk Staatsburgerschap (Association for Women's Interests and Equal Citizenship) and became an active campaigner for changes to the legal statutes for matrimonial property and employment.

Thung joined the Chinese student association, Chung Hwa Hui (Chinese: 中華會) and served on its board during 1926 and 1927. She gave several lectures at Chung Hwa Hui on feminist issues, like Het een en ander over de Chinese meisjes in Indonesie (Notes on Chinese Girls' Education in Indonesia) in 1926 and two years later a talk Het Montessori Onderwijs (The Montessori Education), on the innovative teaching methods used by Maria Montessori. On graduating in 1927, Thung went on to earn a master's degree the following year. She then traveled in Europe with her sisters before returning home. In December 1929, (Note: Salmon states that Thung returned to Batavia in February 1928 and remained for 13 months leaving in March 1932. If she left in 13 months and arrived in February 1928, she would have returned in March 1929. Van der Plas has Thung leaving in 1929 and returning in 1931, while Kuiken says she returned in 1929 and was back in the Netherlands in 1932. It seems unlikely that Thung left in February 1928, as she passed an examination in her studies in August 1928 and was aboard the Indrapoera, which arrived in Tandjong Priok in January 1930. If indeed she stayed 13 months, then it is likely that she left as noted by Van der Plas in early 1931. But, in her own account of 1933, Thung states she stayed in Java for 18 months, after completing her master's degree in 1928 and traveling with her sisters.) Thung returned to Batavia aboard the M.S. Indrapoera to attend her sister, Eng Nio's wedding.

== Career ==
=== Early career and additional schooling ===
In 1930, Thung began working as a physician's assistant and social worker at the Yang Seng Ie Hospital (Chinese: 養生院; now Rumah Sakit Husada), founded by doctor Kwa Tjoan Sioe. She worked with women from the poorest neighborhoods of Batavia who were suffering from malnutrition, poverty, and venereal diseases. She also participated in clinics for infants, instructing women in child care and birth control. While continuing her work with the physician, Thung founded the First Chinese Girls' Boarding School in the upscale neighborhood of Welgelegen. Serving as its director, and with an all-female staff, she strove to overcome the resistance of Chinese parents to educating their daughters. After spending a year and a half in Batavia, she returned to Rotterdam where she completed her doctorate in economics in 1932.

Thung decided to study medicine at the University of Amsterdam, believing, after her experience working in the hospital, that there was a need for women physicians in Java. In 1933, she resigned from Chung Hwa Hui and joined the break-away student group, Studieclub van Chineesche Studenten (Study Club of Chinese Students). She continued her involvement in feminist actions and was inspired by Catharine van Tussenbroek, a physician and feminist, who had been involved in the campaign to found a women's party. Thung believed that until women recognized their need for financial independence, a women's party would not be effective. She began writing articles for the Chinese women's monthly journal, Fu Nu Tsa Chih (Chinese: 婦女雜志), founded by Liem Sam Tjiang-Ong (Chinese: 林三昌王) in 1932 in Malang. She published articles in the Dutch women's magazine Vrouw en Gemeenschap (Women and Community), one of which related her struggles with schooling and her search for economic independence.

=== Medical practice and activism ===
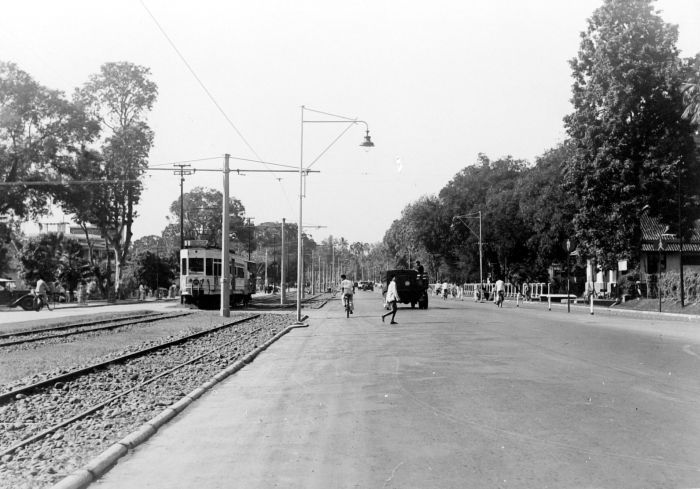
Salemba, Batavia circa 1940

After graduating in medicine in 1938, Thung returned to Batavia and on 13 September opened a private practice catering to women and children in her family home in the Salemba neighborhood. Modeling a child care course on those she had encountered in the Netherlands, Thung held classes for mothers, undertaking regular health checks on their children. Simultaneously, she published articles advocating for women's suffrage and about women's issues in magazines such as Fu Nu Tsa Chih; Fu Len (Chinese: 婦人), founded by Ong Pik Hwa (Chinese: 王碧華); Maandblad Istri, a Sino-Malay publication founded by Njonja Tjoa Hin Hoei; and the newspaper Sin Po (Chinese: 新报). Her articles in Maandblad Istri, on whose board she served, typically provided medical advice on child care and nutrition or addressed education for women.

Though Thung was a member of the Association for Women's Interests and Equal Citizenship in the Netherlands, the affiliate Vereeniging voor Vrouwenkiesrecht in Nederlands Indie (Association for Women's Suffrage in the Dutch East Indies) in reaction to nationalist aims of Indonesian women, pursued enfranchisement only for European women. Thung joined the Chung Hwa Fu Nu Hui (Chinese Women's Association), founded in 1938 and set up the Hutspot-club (Hodge-Podge Club) which provided opportunities for women from different classes and ethnic backgrounds to engage with each other. She was active on the committee to seek the vote for Chinese women and opposed the government's 1940 proposal to withhold the vote from non-Europeans. Collecting "thousands of signatures", Thung and other women protested the proposal.

In 1941, an amendment was proposed by another woman physician, Mrs. J. Ch. Neuyen-Hakker, to the Volksraad (the colonial legislature) which advocated granting the right to vote and hold office to educated women of any race under the same terms as men. To counter the argument that women did not actually want the right to vote, Neuyen-Hakker proposed that women's registration be left to their individual choice to register. The proposal was accepted by the Volksraad and approved by the government in November 1941. That year, Thung also participated in the tenth-anniversary celebrations of the First Chinese Girls' Boarding School and the fifth-anniversary of the school's creation of a professional trade school for women.

The following year, when the Japanese invaded Java and interred all the European physicians in 1943, Thung opened a private clinic, San Te Ie Juen to provide medical service to the upper classes. She continued her own private practice and did volunteer work at a local hospital for the duration of World War II. In 1945, when nationalists declared Indonesian independence, Batavia was renamed Jakarta. From 1945 to 1951, Thung was employed by the Ministry of Education to monitor the health of all of the school children in the city. She measured the height and weight of students for the Institute for Public Nutrition and monitored the milk supplements and food provided by the schools to ensure that they were provided in accordance with UNESCO standards.

=== Entry into politics ===
In addition to her educational duties and her private practice, in 1948 Thung ran as a candidate of the Persatuan Tionghoa and was elected as the first woman to serve on the Municipal Council, where her father had also served decades earlier. Thung was sent by the Indonesian Government, as an economist with several other Dutch-trained specialists, on several fact-finding missions abroad between 1949 and 1952. She served as an interpreter to several trade delegations in cities such as Helsinki and Moscow, using her skill with English. She made seven trips to China, the first in September 1951 and, given her admiration for Mao Zedong and communism, she continued to visit the country regularly between 1955 and 1965. In the aftermath of the 1965 Indonesian coup d'état, support for communism was banned and Thung's travels for the government ceased. When in 1968, the new government implemented an assimilationist policy, requiring Chinese citizens to use an Indonesian name, Thung refused. She emigrated permanently to the Netherlands.

=== Later career in the Netherlands ===
Thung settled in Eindhoven, where she continued to work as a physician in a public health center and in a children's home. In 1972, she became a naturalized Dutch citizen and then retired in 1974, when she became eligible for the elderly person's pension. In 1978, she returned to China for a visit and was noted for her contributions to charitable organizations, including a fund for repairs to the primary school in her ancestral village, Yunshan (Chinese: 云山) in Hua'an County. On 29 April 1983, Thung was honored as a knight in the Order of Orange-Nassau for her contributions toward the emancipation of women.

== Death and legacy ==
Thung died on 5 January 1996 in Eindhoven. She has been remembered in books published in China for her social activism and in 2000 her biography was included in a publication about the Thung (Tang) family from the Fujian province. She also has a brief biography in Leo Suryadinata's book, Prominent Indonesian Chinese. Her papers were donated to the International Archives for the Women's Movement and are now housed in the Atria Institute on Gender Equality and Women's History in Amsterdam.
