= Syair Abdul Muluk =

1847 poem written by Raja Ali Haji

Syair Abdul Muluk شَعِيْر عَبْدُالْمُلُوْك
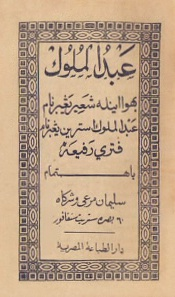
- Cover
- Author: Raja Ali Haji
- Language: Malay
- Genre: Syair
- Publisher: Tijdschrift voor Neerl. Indië
- Publication date: 1847
- Publication place: Dutch East Indies (Indonesia)

Sjair Abdoel Moeloek (شَعِيْر عَبْدُالْمُلُوْك; Perfected Spelling: Syair Abdul Muluk) is an 1847 (Note: Some sources, such as Zaini-Lajoubert (1994, p. 103), give 1846. Others, such as Andaya (2003, p. 96), give 1845. However, 1847 is the most common date given in sources.) syair (poem) credited variously to Raja Ali Haji or his sister Saleha. It tells of a woman who passes as a man to free her husband from the Sultan of Hindustan, who had captured him in an assault on their kingdom. The book, with its theme of gender disguise common to contemporary Javanese and Malay literature, has been read as repositioning the hierarchy of men and women as well as the nobility and servants.

Syair Abdul Muluk has seen several reprints and translations. It is often adapted to the stage, and was the basis for Lie Kim Hok's Sair Tjerita Siti Akbari.

== Plot ==
Abdul Muluk is the son of Abdul Hamid Syah, Sultan of Barbari. Raised in the nobility, at a young age he marries Siti Rahmat. When his father dies, Abdul Muluk takes the throne. Some time later he departs Barbari to explore the world, leaving his uncle Mansur in control of the sultanate. Ultimately Abdul Muluk arrives in Ban, where he falls in love with the sultan's daughter Siti Rafiah. The two are married.

Six months later Abdul Muluk departs Ban with his wife. Upon arriving in Barbari they are welcomed warmly. Siti Rahmat and Siti Rafiah get along well and treat each other as sisters; Abdul Muluk, meanwhile, spends his days with his two wives, and Siti Rafiah is soon pregnant. However, their happiness is short lived: the Sultan of Hindustan attacks without making a declaration of war, intending to avenge the death of his uncle. The palace's guards and advisers are slaughtered, while Siti Rahmat and Abdul Muluk are captured. Siti Rafiah, meanwhile, escapes. Six months later she finds a sheikh, who takes her in and protects her.

After giving birth Siti Rafiah decides to avenge her husband's imprisonment. She leaves her son, Abdul Ghani, to be raised by the sheikh and passes for a man, taking the name Dura. When she reaches the sultanate of Barbaham she finds it in a state of chaos. The rightful sultan, Jamaluddin, is being usurped by his uncle Bahsan. As Dura, Siti Rafiah helps Jamaluddin secure his rule. With the help of Barbaham's army, Siti Rafiah attacks Hindustan. The sultan of Hindustan is arrested, while Abdul Muluk and Siti Rahmat are released. Siti Rafiah then reveals her true self, rejoining her husband.

Elsewhere, Abdul Ghani, now age seven, departs the sheikh's home to look for his parents. When he is accused of stealing from an inn, a passerby saves him; Abdul Ghani then lives with him. After an incident in which he wounds a slave, Abdul Ghani is brought before the Sultan of Ban, who realises that the boy is his grandson. The sheikh is made religious leader of Ban, and when the sultan dies Abdul Ghani replaces him.

== Authorship ==
The author of Syair Abdul Muluk is uncertain. Raja Ali Haji, a Buginese-Malay writer based in Riau, is credited by Philippus Pieter Roorda van Eysinga; Raja Ali Haji had declared himself to be the author in a letter to Roorda van Eysinga, which included the manuscript which was later published. Another candidate is Raja Ali Haji's sister Saleha (also spelled Zaleha and Salihat), whom Hermann von de Wall credited with authorship in a now-lost manuscript catalogued by van den Berg.

== Themes and styles ==
The plot device of a woman passing herself as a man to do war, as in Syair Abdul Muluk, was a common one in Malay and Javanese literature, including the Pandji stories from Java and hikayat and syair from Malaya. Other examples included the Hikayat Panji Semirang, Hikayat Jauhar Manikam, and Syair Siti Zubaidah Perang Cina. The latter work shares several plot similarities with Syair Abdul Muluk, although as Syair Siti Zubaidah Perang Cina is undated it is impossible to determine which came first.

The literary scholar Monique Zaini-Lajoubert notes that Syair Abdul Muluk shows that women can play a powerful role. However, these women obtain their power not from their womanhood but by passing as a man. Ultimately, she suggests, the text emphasises that a good woman is a faithful wife. Barbara Watson Andaya likewise notes a feminist theme, although in some cases – such as polygamy – the contents do not diverge from society's expectations.

Theatre scholar Julian Millie notes that other states of power are inverted in the story. He writes "codes of propriety are made fun of and hierarchies are inverted" through interactions between nobles and their servants.

== Publication ==
Syair Abdul Muluk was first published in 1847, when Roorda van Eysinga published a reproduction and translation in Tijdschrift voor Neerl. Indië; this publication credits the work to Raja Ali Haji. The syair was later transliterated by Arnold Snackey from a Jawi original. An 1892 edition by Hermann von de Wall credited the main text to Salihah; in this version Raja Ali Haji edited the text. Another early edition, from Singapore, was an 1860 lithograph by Akbar Saidina and Hajji Muhammad Yahya; several further lithographs were published in Singapore over the next dozen years. In 1934 a version was published by Balai Pustaka in Batavia (now Jakarta); this edition was based on the three extant versions described above. An edition edited by Sitti Syamsiar was published by the Malaysian Department of Education and Culture in 1988–89.

== Reception ==
By the late 19th century Syair Abdul Muluk had been adapted to the stage by various groups; stage performances continued into the 20th century. Performers are generally required to memorise their lines by rote from previously prepared lithographs. The text may have been translated into Sundanese as Siti Rapiah.

Syair Abdul Muluk has been considered the source material for Lie Kim Hok's 1884 work Sair Tjerita Siti Akbari, published in Batavia. The similarities in plot were first put forth by Tio Ie Soei in a 1923 editorial, then followed by a polemic in various local Chinese media. As a result, Lie, styled the "father of Chinese Malay literature", was criticised as unoriginal. In an article comparing the two, Zaini-Lajoubert notes that, although the plots are quite similar, Lie infused more realism into his work.

== Works cited ==
- Andaya, Barbara Watson (2003). "Gender, Islam and the Bugis Diaspora in Nineteenth and Twentieth-Century Riau" (PDF). Sari: International Journal of Malay World Studies. 21: 77–108.
- Dalam Berkekalan Persahabatan: Surat-surat Raja Ali Haji kepada Von de Wall [In the Strength of Friendship: Raja Ali Haji's Letters to Von de Wall] (in Malay). Leiden: University of Leiden. 1995. ISBN 9799100577.
- Liaw, Yock Fang (2011). Sejarah Kesusastraan Melayu Klasik [History of Classic Malay Literature] (in Indonesian). Yayasan Obor Indonesia.
- Millie, Julian, ed. (2004). Bidasari: Jewel of Malay Muslim Culture. Leiden: KITLV Press. ISBN 9067182249.
- Tio, Ie Soei (1958). Lie Kimhok 1853–1912 (in Indonesian). Bandung: Good Luck. OCLC 1069407.
- Zaini-Lajoubert, Monique (1994). "Le Syair Cerita Siti Akbari de Lie Kim Hok (1884) ou un avatar du Syair Abdul Muluk (1846)" [Syair Cerita Siti Akbari by Lie Kim Hok (1884), or an Adaptation of Syair Abdul Muluk (1846)]. Archipel (in French). 48 (48): 103–124. doi:10.3406/arch.1994.3005.
