= Malajoe Batawi =

1884 book by Lie Kim Hok

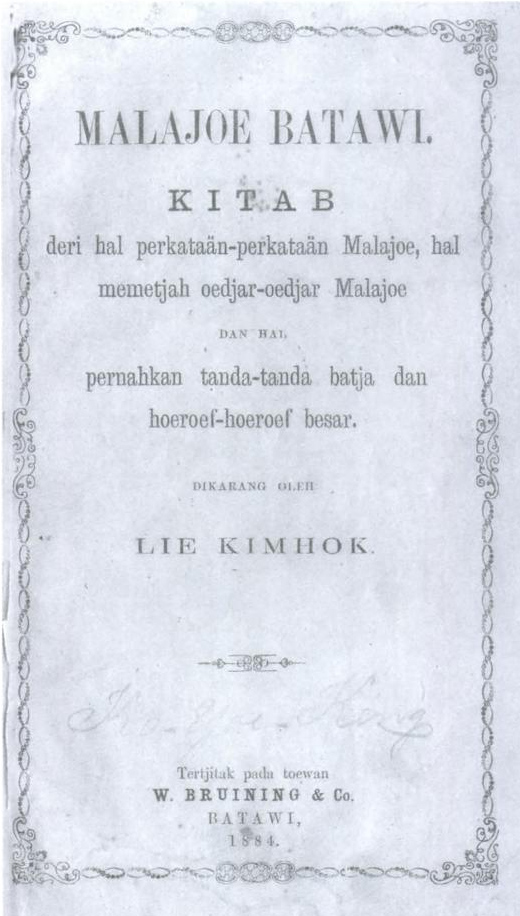
- First printing, 1884
- Author: Lie Kim Hok
- Language: Low Malay
- Genre: Grammar
- Publication date: 1884
- Publication place: Dutch East Indies
- Pages: 116
- OCLC: 27142003

Malajoe Batawi: Kitab deri hal Perkataän-Perkataän Malajoe, Hal Memetjah Oedjar-Oedjar Malajoe dan Hal Pernahkan Tanda-Tanda Batja dan Hoeroef-Hoeroef Besar (Note: Literally "Batavian Malay: Book on Malay Speech, Words, and the Use of Punctuation and Capital Letters") (better known by the short title Malajoe Batawi; Perfected Spelling: Melayu Betawi: Kitab dari hal Perkataan-Perkataan Melayu, Hal Memecah Ujar-Ujar Melayu dan Hal Pernahkan Tanda-Tanda Baca dan Huruf-Huruf Besar; literally Betawi Malay: A Book of Malay Words, Breaking Up Malay Saying and Punctuation Marks and Capital Letters) is a grammar of the Malay language as spoken in Batavia (now Jakarta) written by Lie Kim Hok. The 116-page book, first published in 1884, saw two printings and has been described as the "most remarkable achievement of Chinese Malay writing".

== Background and writing ==
During the late 1800s numerous books and newspapers had been published in Batavia (now Jakarta) using a creole form of Malay. These books, including translations of Chinese works, did not use a standardised language. Some were written entirely in one sentence, with a single capital letter at the beginning and a single full stop at the end.

Lie Kim Hok (1853–1912) was a journalist and teacher who wrote extensively in the creole. He considered the lack of standardisation appalling, and began to write a grammar of the language to ensure a degree of regularity in its use. The same year he published Malajoe Batawi, he released Kitab Edja (Spelling Book), a book to teach spelling to schoolchildren.

== Contents ==
Malajoe Batawi's 116 pages consist of 23 pages discussing the use of capital letters and punctuation, 23 pages discussing word classes, and the remainder regarding sentence structure and writing. Lie discusses various morphemes, including the active-transitive morpheme [me(N)-] and the active-intransitive [ber-].

Lie identifies ten word classes in Malajoe Batawi, as follows:

Ten word classes in Malajoe Batawi
	Word Classes		
	Malajoe Batawi	Contemporary Spelling	English Translation
1	nama paäda	nama pengada	nouns
2	pengganti nama	pengganti nama	pronouns
3	penerang	penerang	adjectives
4	pemoela	pemula	articles
5	nama bilangan	nama bilangan	cardinals
6	nama kerdja	nama kerja	verbs
7	penerangan	penerangan	adverbs
8	pengoendjok	pengunjuk	prepositions
9	pengoeboeng	penghubung	conjunction
10	oetjap seroe	ucap seru	interjections

== Release and reception ==
Malajoe Batawi was published in 1884 by W. Bruining & Co. in Batavia. Tio Ie Soei, in his biography of Lie, describes it as first grammar of Batavian Malay, while linguist Waruno Mahdi calls it the first "elaborate grammar of a Malay dialect along modern lines". The book saw an initial print run of 500 copies. According to Tio, it came under consideration for use as teaching material in local schools. However, the publisher requested changes with which Lie disagreed, and ultimately the deal fell through. A second edition was published by Albrecht & Rusche in 1891, and towards his death in 1912 Lie began writing a new edition of Malajoe Batawi. However, he died before it could be completed.

In 1979, C.D. Grijns opined that, based on the primarily oral nature of Betawi, Lie did not base his Malajoe Batawi on spoken language, but the written language used by ethnic Chinese merchants. Malaysian press historian Ahmat B. Adam describes Lie as leaving "an indelible mark on the development of modern Indonesian language", while Mahdi writes that the grammar was the "most remarkable achievement of Chinese Malay writing" from a linguist's point of view.
