= Sierk Coolsma =

Dutch missionary

- Born: 26 January 1840; Leeuwarden, Netherlands
- Died: 20 March 1926 (aged 86); Apeldoorn, Netherlands
- Occupations: Missionary and writer
- Years active: 1869–1926
- Spouse: Maria Johanna Gerretson (m. 1866; d. 1917)
- Parent(s): Foppe Coolsma, Maaike Nauta
- Family: Dora van der Meiden-Coolsma (granddaughter)

Sierk Coolsma (Dutch pronunciation: [ˈsiːr(ə) ˈkoːlsmaː]; 26 January 1840 – 20 March 1926) was a Dutch Protestant missionary who wrote extensively on the Sundanese language. Born in the Netherlands, he became a missionary in his early twenties and arrived in the Dutch East Indies in 1865. First tasked to Cianjur, he studied Sundanese in more detail than his contemporaries, gaining an appreciation for the language. Further missionary activities in Bogor, begun in 1869, were a failure, and in 1873 he was tasked with translating the New Testament into Sundanese. Although the Sundanese people highly valued poetry, he did the translation in prose hoping that it would help readers entertain new ideas.

In 1876, Coolsma returned to the Netherlands and became the leader of the Netherlands Missionary Union, promoting further missionary activity in the predominantly Muslim western portion of the East Indies. He also wrote extensively on Sundanese, including a grammar and two dictionaries. Although his Bible translation had little lasting impact, these later works have remained in use.

== Early life and missionary work ==
Sierk Coolsma was born in Leeuwarden in the Netherlands, on 26 January 1840, as son of worker Foppe Coolsma and Maaike Nauta.

Coolsma first worked in a printer's office, but began training to be a missionary in Rotterdam in 1861, after having studied several months under Rev. Witteveen in Ermelo in the previous year. He finished his training on 5 May 1864; that December he left for Batavia (now Jakarta), the capital of the Dutch colony in the East Indies.

Upon arrival in April 1865, Coolsma was sent by the Netherlands Missionary Union (Netherlandsche Zendingsvereeniging, NZV) to the town of Cianjur. There, on 5 April 1866, he married Maria Johanna Gerretson, six years his younger. He also baptised the NZV's first Sundanese Christians, a husband and wife named Ismael and Moerti. Ismael continued to treat Coolsma as his teacher and help the missionaries spread Christianity until his death in 1872.

While in Cianjur, Coolsma began to study the language used by the Sundanese people who inhabited the area. Eventually, according to Mikihiro Moriyama of Nanzan University, he "had a sharper insight and deeper knowledge" than contemporary missionaries and government workers. Later missionaries would not study the language in such detail.

Coolsma left Cianjur in 1869 and went to Bogor, also a majority-Sundanese city. He found little success in preaching to the European citizens of the city or converting the Sundanese. On 31 May 1869, he opened a school at his home, which provided a free education in both secular and religious studies. The first class had ten students, a total which grew quickly; at its peak, the school had 111 students. After a government-funded school was opened in 1872, most of the Sundanese students moved there to avoid the Christian teachings. The remaining students were mostly ethnic Chinese, few of whom converted.

== Bible translation ==
In 1873, Coolsma published a grammar of the Sundanese language, titled Handleiding bij de beoefening der Soendaneesche taal ('Manual for the Writing of the Sundanese Language'). He reluctantly used a transcription method developed by K. F. Holle and proscribed by the colonial government. That year he was tasked with translating the New Testament into Sundanese. He left his school in the hands of fellow missionary D. J. van der Linden and went to Sumedang; there he worked on his translation over a period of three years.

Coolsma found that Sundanese literature consisted predominantly of poetry, including the narrative wawacan, and thought that prose needed to be developed as well so that the people would embrace modernity. He considered that they rarely read, instead preferring to listen to more educated persons sing in verse. As such, the contents of written prose would not be conveyed. This is not to say that he disliked Sundanese poetry; he was appreciative of the dangding verse forms – derived from Javanese literary tradition – which were used to write wawacan, and considered an existing translation of the Gospel of Matthew in dangding to be the best Sundanese-language book in print.

Ultimately, Coolsma chose to translate the Gospel of John and Acts of the Apostles using prose, believing that dangding was "too traditional to convey new ideas" and hoping to promote a "new spirit". However, for accessibility's sake he published using the Jawi script; most literate Sundanese could read it, unlike the Javanese or Latin scripts also used in the area. The translation grew to include much of the New Testament, and by the 1890s the whole Bible. It was, however, little read.

== Later life ==
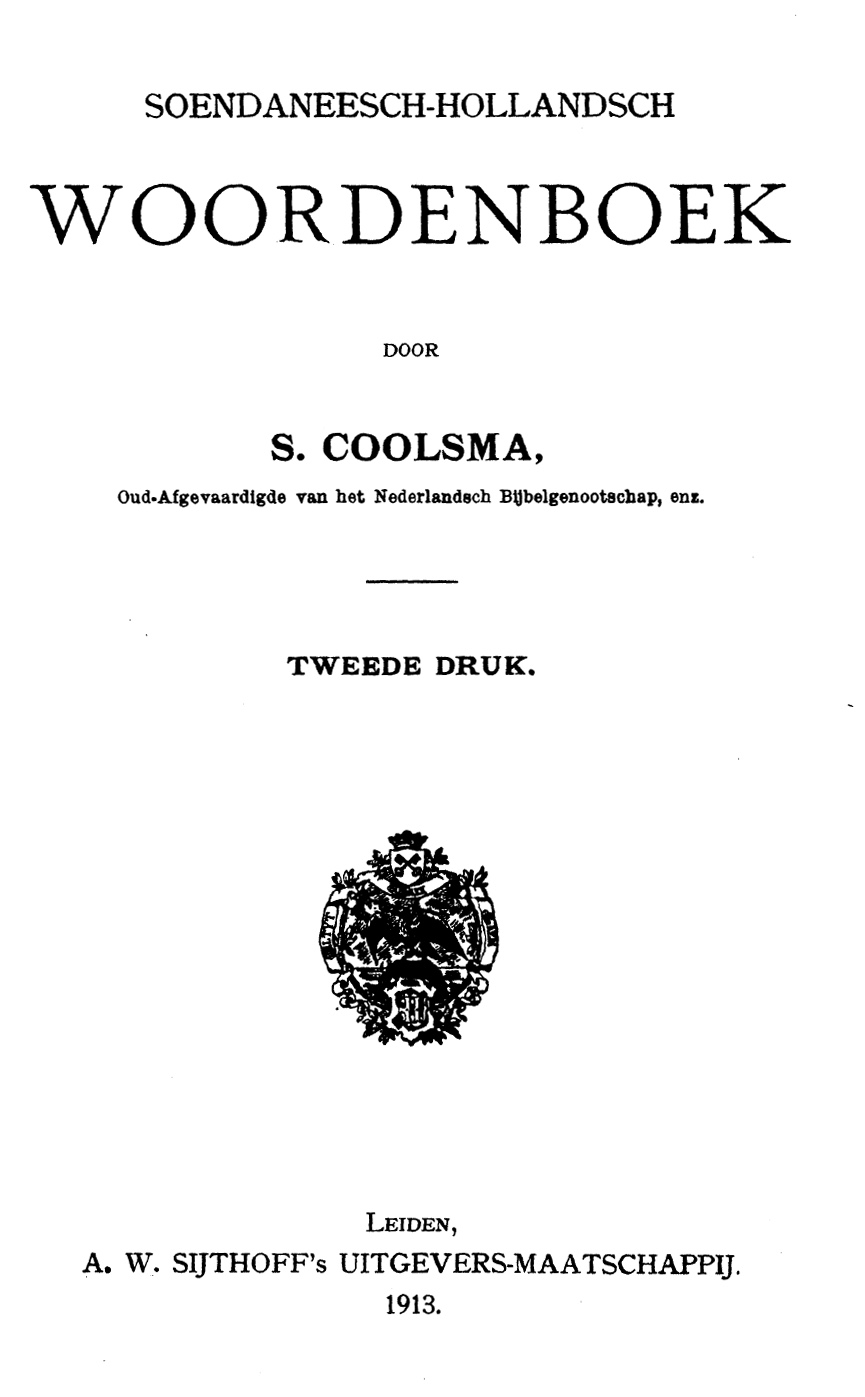
Soendaneesch-Hollandsch woordenboek, 1913

Coolsma returned to the Netherlands with his wife in 1876 and became the leader of the NZV, holding the office until 1908. He disputed the idea that missionary work should be focused on the non-Islamicised eastern portion of the colony. He believed instead that missionary work should be prioritised in the western portion, where Islam had already become entrenched.

Coolsma continued to write about both missionary work and the Sundanese language. In 1881, he wrote a series of condemnatory reviews of Sundanese-language schoolbooks offered by the colonial government, arguing that the content had little value and the language was mostly artificial. He published a Sundanese-Dutch dictionary in 1884, consulting various works of Sundanese literature for his lexemes. In 1901, he published a history of the mission in the East Indies, titled De zendingseeuw voor Nederlandsche Oost-Indiës (The Century of the Mission in the Dutch East Indies). It described the 19th century as time of extensive growth.

In 1904, Coolsma published a revised version of his grammar. Working with fellow missionary Christiaan Albers, who had also preached in Cianjur, Coolsma published a Dutch-Sundanese dictionary in 1911; this was followed by a revised version of his Sundanese-Dutch dictionary in 1913. Coolsma's wife died on 27 September 1917. Her death led him to reduce his workload, although he found time to publish his memoirs, Terugblik op mijn levensweg, 1840–1924 (Looking Back on my Life, 1840–1924), in 1924. He died two years later, on 20 March 1926.

== Legacy ==
Coolsma was recognised as a Knight of the Order of Orange-Nassau before his death. Moriyama writes that Coolsma's "unrivaled" dictionary and grammar had a much greater impact than his Bible translations, serving as a basis for the standardisation of written Sundanese. The grammar remains an authoritative source on Sundanese syntax, and despite the colonial government limiting its distribution – afraid the publication of a work by Christian missionaries would provoke the majority-Muslim Sundanese – it was used in various Sundanese educational institutions. In 1985, the grammar was translated into Indonesian and republished by Djambatan.

== Bibliography ==
- 1877: Pĕrdjangdjian anjar, hartosna sadajana kitab noe kasĕbat indjil goesti oerang Jesoes Kristoes
- 1880: De Soendaneesche bijbelvertaling (The Sundanese Bible Translation)
- 1881: West-Java: het land, de bewoners en de arbeid der Nederlandsche Zendingsvereeniging (Western Java: the Land, the Inhabitants, and the Work of the Dutch Missionary Union)
- 1884: Soendaneesch-Hollandsch woordenboek (Sundanese–Dutch Dictionary)
- 1891: De Heilige Schrift, of al de boeken des Ouden en Nieuwen Testaments in het Soendaneesch (The Holy Scripture, or All Books of the Old and New Testament in Sundanese)
- 1895: Ismael en Moerti, de eerstelingen uit de Soendaneezen (Ismael and Moerti, the Firstlings of the Sundanese People)
- 1900: De beteekenis van de hulppredikers voor de zending in Nederl. Oost-Indië (The Significance of the Auxiliary Preachers in the Dutch East Indies)
- 1901: De zendingseeuw voor Nederlandsch Oost-Indië (The Missionary Century for the Dutch East Indies)
- 1904: Soendaneesche spraakkunst (Sundanese Grammar)
- 1911: Hollandsch-Soendaneesch woordenboek (Dutch–Sundanese Dictionary)
- 1911: Ant. A. Pennings in Bantam (Ant. A. Pennings in Bantam)
- 1914: Het boek Job: populaire vertaling uit het oorspronkelijke (The Book of Job: Popular Translation from the Original)
- 1917: J. de Liefde in zijn leven en werken geschetst (J. de Liefde Outlined in his Life and Work)
- 1924: Terugblik op mijn levensweg (1840-1924) (Looking Back on my Life's Path (1840–1924))
- 1928: Pantjawangsa

== See also ==
- Lie Kim Hok, one of Coolsma's students
- Phoa Keng Hek Sia, another of Coolsma's students

== Works cited ==
- Aritonang, Jan S.; Steenbrink, Karel A., eds. (2008). A History of Christianity in Indonesia. Studies in Christian Mission. Vol. 35. Leiden: Brill. ISBN 978-90-04-17026-1.
- van den End, Th. (2006). Sumber-sumber Zending Tentang Sejarah Gereja Di Jabar [Missionary Sources Regarding the History of the Church in West Java] (in Indonesian). Jakarta: Gunung Mulia. ISBN 978-979-687-252-7.
- Moriyama, Mikihiro (2005). Sundanese Print Culture & Modernity in 19th century West Java. Singapore: Singapore University Press. ISBN 978-9971-69-322-0.
- "S. Coolsma †". Algemeen Handelsblad (in Dutch). Amsterdam: P. den Hengst en Zoon. 21 March 1926.
- Steenbrink, Karel A (2003). Catholics in Indonesia, 1808–1942: A Documented History: A Modest Recovery 1808–1903. Leiden: KITLV Press. ISBN 978-90-6718-141-9.
- Terugblik op mijn levensweg, 1840–1924. OCLC 10209485 – via WorldCat.
- Tio, Ie Soei (1958). Lie Kimhok 1853–1912 (in Indonesian). Bandung: Good Luck. OCLC 1069407.
