= Miss Riboet's Orion =

Theatrical troupe in the Dutch East Indies

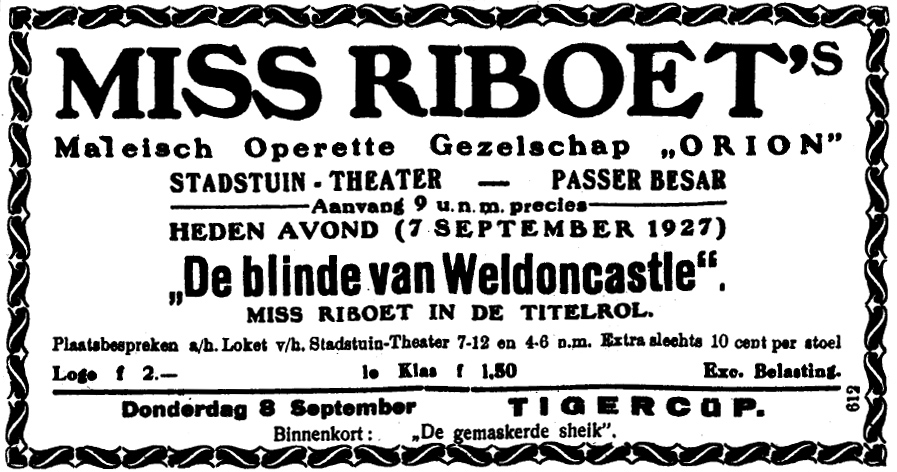
An advertisement for a Miss Riboet's Orion performance

Miss Riboet's Orion, originally known as the Orion Opera, was a theatrical troupe active in the Dutch East Indies (now Indonesia) in the 1920s and early 1930s. Established by the husband and wife team Tio Tek Djien and Miss Riboet, the company travelled throughout the Indies and performed various acts, particularly those with action scenes. It was disbanded in 1942, having lost much of its popularity due to competition with Dardanella.

== History ==
In the late 19th century various forms of popular theatre, inspired by Western techniques and formats, began to develop in the Dutch East Indies, a colony of the Netherlands. The earliest were the Malayan bangsawan troupes, who traveled to Sumatra and Java beginning in the 1880s. The Komedi Stamboel developed in the Indies in the 1890s, inspired by these bangsawan troupes. By 1910 various organisations run by the ethnic Chinese had begun holding stage performances, which they termed "operas", as fundraisers; these troupes eventually developed into professional ones, acting for profit.

In 1925 Tio Tek Djien (2 December 1895–1975), an ethnic Chinese businessman from East Java, established Orion Opera together with his wife, Miss Riboet (24 December 1900 – 19 April 1965), who took the lead role. Though Tio drew on the earlier bangsawan and komedi stamboel, as with his contemporaries such as Tengku Katan's Union Dahlia, he introduced several changes. Stories selected were shorter ones, with shorter scenes, which could be completed in a single night. No longer were the characters introduced before the performance, and the number of scenes with singing and dancing was drastically reduced, limited only to inter-act performances. Orion's repertoire was likewise different: instead of traditional tales, such as those based on the One Thousand and One Nights, Orion tended to perform original stories, though it also produced some adaptations of Western works.

Initially the troupe's original stories were written by Tio himself. By the late 1920s he had hired Njoo Cheong Seng, a journalist and writer, to help produce original scripts. Works by Njoo which the troupe performed included Kiamat (Apocalypse), Tengkorak (Skull), and Tueng Balah, while Tio wrote such works as R.A. Soemantri. These stories were most often filled with action, and, though written in detail, left room for improvisation. When Miss Riboet proved highly popular as a swordfighter in these plays, as well as a kroncong singer, the troupe was named after her.

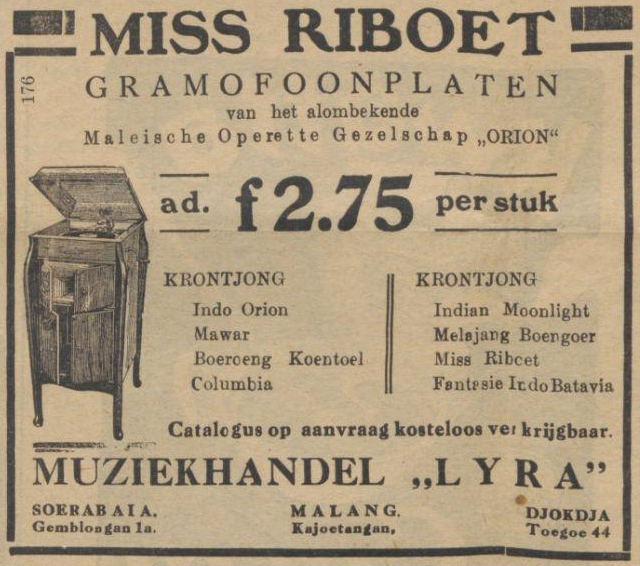
An advertisement for gramophone records featuring Miss Riboet's vocals

Though initially limited to an amusement park in Central Java, the troupe quickly proved popular and travelled from city to city. They sold gramophone records to supplement their income, and Miss Riboet became the first recording star of the Indies. Stores sold Miss Riboet brand merchandise, including wristwatches. In 1927 the company attempted to make a film. Tio asked Nelson Wong to first record the troupe's performances, a task which Wong did using a simple camera. Hoping to create a profitable fiction film, Tio asked Wong to direct, a request Wong accept as long as Tio would help bring Wong's brothers from China. When the brothers arrived in the Indies, Tio bought an old tapioca flour factory in Bandung for them to use as a studio. Nelson and Tio began plans to make a film starring Miss Riboet, but these were cancelled after discovering that Riboet's face was "not photogenic". (Note: Original: ... wajahnya tidak baik untuk kamera.)

In 1926 another theatrical troupe, Dardanella, was established by Willy A. Piedro. As with Miss Riboet's Orion, Dardanella quickly became known for its action-themed plays, a repertoire which included several stories about Zorro and an adaptation of The Count of Monte Cristo in Batavia; such was the troupe's popularity that its leading man, Tan Tjeng Bok, was soon styled the "Douglas Fairbanks of Java". By 1931 the competition from Dardanella had led to an advertising war between the two troupes, each focusing on their best-received works: Gagak Solo from Miss Riboet's Orion and Dr Samsi from Dardanella.

In 1934 Njoo and his wife, the actress Fifi Young, migrated to Dardanella. Though Orion continued to perform, it was unable to compete with Dardanella. It was disbanded during the Japanese occupation of the Dutch East Indies (1942–1945). After 1950 Tio attempted to reunite the troupe, but was unsuccessful.

== Reception and legacy ==
Indonesian literary scholar Jakob Sumardjo writes that Miss Riboet's Orion laid the basis for modern theatre in Indonesia, a feat he attributes to both Tio and Njoo having been well educated (as opposed to earlier, business-oriented, theatre patrons). Contemporary critic Tzu You, writing in 1939, considered Miss Riboet's Orion to have had the potential to create high quality, literary, stage plays, but that said potential was wasted as Tio focused only on following the public's tastes. An anonymous review in De Indische Courant recommended the opera company as a good one, particularly praising Miss Riboet's singing and acting.

A stageplay put on by Miss Riboet's, entitled Pembalesan Siti Akbari, was reprinted by the Lontar Foundation in 2006 using the Perfected Spelling System. The play is an adaptation of Lie Kim Hok's 1884 poem Sair Tjerita Siti Akbari.

== Works cited ==
- Biran, Misbach Yusa (2009). Sejarah Film 1900–1950: Bikin Film di Jawa [History of Film 1900–1950: Making Films in Java] (in Indonesian). Jakarta: Komunitas Bamboo working with the Jakarta Art Council. ISBN 978-979-3731-58-2.
- Cohen, Matthew Isaac (2006). The Komedie Stamboel: Popular Theater in Colonial Indonesia, 1891–1903. Athens: Ohio University Press. ISBN 978-0-89680-246-9.
- Cohen, Matthew Isaac (2007). "Riboet, Miss (1900?–1965)". In Leiter, Samuel L. (ed.). Encyclopedia of Asian Theatre: O-Z. Westport: Greenwood Press. pp. 161–62. ISBN 978-0-313-33531-0.
- Lontar Foundation, ed. (2006). Antologi Drama Indonesia 1895–1930 [Anthology of Indonesian Dramas 1895–1930] (in Indonesian). Jakarta: Lontar Foundation. ISBN 978-979-99858-2-8.
- "Operettegezelschap 'Orion'" [Opera Troupe 'Orion']. De Indische Courant (in Dutch). Surabaya. 8 May 1926. p. 2.
- Setyautama, Sam; Mihardja, Suma (2008). Tokoh-tokoh Etnis Tionghoa di Indonesia [Ethnic Chinese Figures in Indonesia] (in Indonesian). Jakarta: Gramedia. ISBN 978-979-9101-25-9.
- Sumardjo, Jakob (1992). Perkembangan Teater Modern dan Sastra Drama Indonesia [Development of Modern Theatre and Indonesian Literary Dramas] (in Indonesian). Bandung: Citra Aditya Bakti. ISBN 978-979-414-615-6.
- "(untitled)". De Indische Courant (in Dutch). Surabaya. 10 February 1928. p. 7.
