= Tio Ie Soei =

Peranakan Chinese writer and journalist

- Born: 22 June 1890; Batavia, Dutch East Indies
- Died: 20 August 1974 (aged 84); Jakarta, Indonesia
- Other name: Tjoa Pit Bak
- Occupations: Writer, journalist

Tio Ie Soei (simplified Chinese: 赵雨水; traditional Chinese: 趙雨水; Pe̍h-ōe-jī: Tiō Í-súi; 22 June 1890 – 20 August 1974), also known by the pen name Tjoa Pit Bak (Chinese: 蔡筆墨; Pe̍h-ōe-jī: Chhòa Pit-ba̍k), was a peranakan Chinese writer and journalist active in the Dutch East Indies and Indonesia. Born in the capital at Batavia (now Jakarta), Tio entered journalism while still a teenager. By 1911 he had begun writing fiction, publishing Sie Po Giok – his first novel – that year. Over the next 50 years Tio wrote extensively in several newspapers and magazines, serving as an editor for some. He also wrote several novels and biographies, including ones on Tan Sie Tat and Lie Kim Hok.

== Early life and career ==
Tio was born in Pasar Baru, Batavia, on 22 June 1890. His father was a Chinese immigrant from Fujian province, while his mother was peranakan Chinese (mixed race). The young Tio was educated at a Dutch-run school for ethnic Chinese, learning Dutch and a smattering of various other languages.

He made his first venture into journalism in 1905, working for a short period for Sinar Betawi. Not long afterwards he quit and joined Perniagaan, which was mostly targeted at ethnic Chinese. He stayed with the publication for another fifteen years. Tio eventually rose to editor. During this period he married the daughter of one of his coworkers.

== Productive period ==
Nona Tjoe Joe, Pertjinta'an jang Membawa Tjilaka (1922)

Tio wrote his earliest fiction in the 1910s. His first novel – targeted at children – was published 1911. Entitled Sie Po Giok, it followed a young orphan who is treated unfairly by his uncle and eventually leaves for China. The story proved popular upon its release, and Tio followed with several further short stories. He also wrote several biographical anthologies in this period.

In 1920 Tio fell ill and resigned from Perniagaan. He and his family moved to Pengalengan, south of Bandung, so he could recuperate. There they opened a vegetable farm. Tio continued to write, sending his work to various publications, including Bintang Soerabaia, Warna Warta, and Kong Po. One of these writings, published in the Bandung-based Lay Po in 1923, revealed that Lie Kim Hok's Sair Tjerita Siti Akbari (1884) had based heavily on Raja Ali Haji's 1846 poem Sjair Abdoel Moeloek. This created a scandal, and Lie was accused of plagiarism. In 1924 he established a literary review, entitled Tjerita Pilihan (Choice Stories) which published translations of European literature; although initial circulation was remarkably high, at 5,000 copies, it had gone bankrupt by the tenth issue.

His time in West Java was one of his most productive, in terms of fiction writing. Under his own name and the pen name Tjoa Pit Bak, he published several novels and biographies with various publishers. Some were translations of European works, while others were ostensibly based on true events in the Indies. These were mostly crime stories, although others, such as his Pieter Elberveld (about Pieter Erberveld), were historical stories based on Dutch language originals.

When he had recovered his strength, Tio moved to Cirebon in 1925 and attempted to open a shop. This was unsuccessful, and he moved to Banjarmasin that year to establish his own newspaper. By 1926 he had returned to Java, working in Surabaya as the editor of Pewarta Soerabaja. He wrote a biography of the boxer Tan Sie Tat in 1928; it would prove to be Tio's last book for thirty years.

== Later career ==
The editorship at Pewarta Soerabaja proved Tio's longest-held position; he headed the newspaper continuously until 1942, when the Japanese occupied the Indies. Tio evacuated from Surabaya and hid near Kediri. He only reentered the press in 1948, when he began writing for the magazine Liberal. In the later years of his career Tio was increasingly active with various press organisations. He headed the Surabayan Reporters Union, which later became part of the Indonesian Reporters Union.

Tio retired from journalism in 1957 and moved to Jakarta. He continued, however, to write. Tio published several articles as a freelance journalist. He also wrote a biography of Lie Kim Hok, published in 1958, commemorating the 105th anniversary of the latter's birth. This book, entitled Lie Kimhok (1853–1912), did not focus exclusively on Lie, but outlined various aspects of peranakan life during the late 19th century. Tio died in Jakarta on 20 August 1974.

== Legacy ==
Sie Po Giok was republished, using the Perfected Spelling System, in 2000 as part of the first instalment in the Kesastraan Melayu Tionghoa series. Tio's biography of Lie Kim Hok was included in the fifth instalment of the series.

== Bibliography ==
- Tjerita Sie Po Giok atawa peroentoengannja satoe anak piatoe (Satoe tjerita di Betawi) [Story of Sie Po Giok, or the Fate of an Orphan (A Story of Batavia)] (in Malay). Batavia: Hoa Siang in Giok. 1911. OCLC 227807289.
- Tjerita Item Poeti dan Meiradi (Doea tjerita pendek, jang pertama kedjadian di Hindia Inggris, dan jang kedoea di Zwitserland) [Story of Black and White and Meiradi (Two Short Stories, the First from the British Indies; the Second in Switzerland)] (in Malay). Batavia: Hoa Siang in Kiok. 1915. OCLC 67963086.
- Harta Besar, Satoe Boekoe jang Bergoena boeat Orang-orang jang Soeka Madjoeken Diri dalem Pergaoelan jang Sopan [A Great Treasure. A book for All Those Looking to Move Forward in Polite Society] (in Malay). Batavia: Tan Thian Soe. c. 1915. OCLC 227807281.
- Tatjana atawa Doeka Lantaran Eïlok (Satoe Tjerita dari Golongan Ambtenaar-ambtenaar di Russland) [Tatjana, or Suffering Because of Beauty (A Story amidst the Functionaries in Russia)] (in Malay). Batavia: Hoa Siang in Kiok. 1917. OCLC 775788863. (in five volumes)
- Apa Artinja Pekerdja'an? (Dari Tjatetan tentang Hal-ichwalnja Beberapa Orang Termashoer dan Hartawan Besar [Why Do We Work? (From Notes on the Lives of Some of the Most Famous and Richest People)] (in Malay). Batavia: Tan Thian Soe. 1920. OCLC 41923054. (in two volumes)
- Li Hung Chang (Lie Hong Tjiang) (in Malay). Weltevreden: Favoriet. c. 1920. OCLC 227807283.
- Badjak: Kedjahatan di Laoetan antara Java dan Australië [Pirates: Crimes on the Seas between Java and Australia] (in Malay). Gresik: Pek & Co. 1921. OCLC 65526668. (in two volumes, translated from the Dutch novel Zeerover)
- Tjerita Nona Siok Lie (Siapa Itoe Pemboenoe?) [The Story of Miss Siok Lie (Who's the Killer?)] (in Malay). Bandung: Toko Marie. 1922. ISBN 9042027835. OCLC 66056117.
- Nona Tjoe Joe: Pertjinta'an jang Membawa Tjilaka [Miss Tjoe Joe: Love that Brings Disaster] (in Malay). Surabaya: Ang Sioe Tjing. 1922. OCLC 318114931.
- Satoe Makota-Radja: Tjerita di Djeman Permoesoehan antara Zweden dan Denemarken [A King's Crown: A Story from the Time of the Rivalry Between Sweden and Denmark] (in Malay). Bandung: Lay Po. 1923. OCLC 227807291.
- Pieter Elberveld: Satoe Kedjadian jang Betoel di Betawi [Pieter Elberveld: A True Story from Batavia] (in Malay). Weltevreden: Pertoenjangan. 1924. OCLC 64687442. (about Pieter Erberveld)
- Sariboe Satoe Malem, Dongeng-dongeng Arab [A Thousand and One Nights, Arabian Fairytales] (in Malay). Weltevreden: Pertoenjangan. 1924. OCLC 65668980.
- Hikajat Pemboenoehan Doorman (Satoe Pemboenoehan sanget Loear Biasa Kedjadian jang Betoel) [Tale of Doorman's Murders (Extraordinary Murders that Truly Happened)] (in Malay). Bandung: Economy. 1925. OCLC 775790998. (as Tjoa Pit Bak)
- Harta atawa Istri? [Fortune or Wife?] (in Malay). Bandung: Economy. 1925. OCLC 67940906. (as Tjoa Pit Bak)
- Terloepoet ... Saltima: Doea Tjerita dari Kedjadian-kedjadian jang Betoel di Djawa Wetan dan Djawa Koelon [Terloepoet ... Saltima: Two Stories Based on True Events in East Java and West Java] (in Malay). Bandung: Economy. 1925. OCLC 227807295.
- Sara Specx: Satoe Kedjadian jang Betoel di Betawi di Djeman Pamerentahannja Jan Pieterszoon Coen dalem Taon 1629 [Sara Specx: A True Event During the Rule of Jan Pieterszoon Coen in 1629] (in Malay). Bandung: Economy. 1926. OCLC 64738420. (as Tjoa Pit Bak)
- Riwajatnja Satoe Boxer Tionghoa (Tan Sie Tiat) [Story of a Chinese Boxer (Tan Sie Tiat)] (in Malay). Surabaya: Hahn Co. 1928. OCLC 63840958.
- Lie Kimhok 1853–1912 (in Indonesian). Bandung: Good Luck. 1958. OCLC 1069407.

== Works cited ==
- A.S., Marcus; Benedanto, Pax, eds. (2000). Kesastraan Melayu Tionghoa dan Kebangsaan Indonesia [Chinese Malay Literature and the Indonesian Nation] (in Indonesian). Vol. 1. Jakarta: Kepustakaan Populer Gramedia. ISBN 978-979-9023-37-7.
- A.S., Marcus; Benedanto, Pax, eds. (2002). Kesastraan Melayu Tionghoa dan Kebangsaan Indonesia [Chinese Malay Literature and the Indonesian Nation] (in Indonesian). Vol. 5. Jakarta: Kepustakaan Populer Gramedia. OCLC 773442281.
- Horton, William Bradley (October 2003). "Pieter Elberveld: The Modern Adventure of an Eighteenth-Century Indonesian Hero". Indonesia. 76: 147–198. Archived from the original on 29 May 2014.
- Jedamski, D.A. (2009). "The Vanishing Act – Sherlock Holmes in Indonesia's National Awakening". In Jedamski, D.A. (ed.). Chewing Over the West: Occidental Narratives in Non-Western Readings (PDF). Cross/Cultures. Vol. 119. Amsterdam: Rodopi. pp. 349–379. Archived from the original (PDF) on 31 May 2016.
- Lombard-Salmon, Claudine (1977). "Tio Ie Soei, journaliste et homme de lettres de Jakarta (1890–1974)" [Tio Ie Soei, Journalist and Writer in Jakarta (1890–1974)]. Archipel (in French). 14 (14): 71–77. doi:10.3406/arch.1977.1358.
- Setyautama, Sam; Mihardja, Suma (2008). Tokoh-tokoh Etnis Tionghoa di Indonesia [Ethnic Chinese Figures in Indonesia] (in Indonesian). Jakarta: Gramedia. ISBN 978-979-9101-25-9.
- Zaini-Lajoubert, Monique (1996). "Syair Cerita Siti Akbari Karya Lie Kim Hok (1884), Penjelmaan Syair Abdul Muluk (1846)" [Syair Cerita Siti Akbari by Lie Kim Hok (1884), Adaptation of Syair Abdul Muluk (1846)]. In Suryadinata, Leo (ed.). Sastra Peranakan Tionghoa Indonesia [Indonesian Peranakan Chinese Literature] (in Indonesian). Jakarta: Grasindo. pp. 277–321.
