= Syair =

Malay genre of story telling

Syair (Jawi: شعير) is a form of traditional Malay (also Brunei and Malaysian) poetry that is made up of four-line stanzas or quatrains. The syair can be a narrative poem, a didactic poem, a poem used to convey ideas on religion or philosophy, or even one to describe a historical event.

In contrast to the pantun, the syair conveys a continuous idea from one stanza to the next, maintains a unity of ideas from the first line to the last line in each stanza, and each stanza has a rhyme scheme a-a-a-a. Syair is sung in set rhythms that differ from syair to syair. The recitation of a syair, which can take up several hours, can be accompanied by music.

== Etymology ==
The word syair is derived from the Arabic word shi’r, a term that covers all genres of Arabic/Islamic poetry. However, the Malay form which goes by the name syair is somewhat different and not modeled on Arabic poetry or on any of the genres of Perso-Arab poetry.

== History ==
The earliest known record of syair is from the work of Hamzah Fansuri, a famous Malay poet in the 17th century.

The most famous syair is an 1847 poem by Raja Pengiran Indera Mahkota Shahbandar: Syair Rakis. It is considered to be the passage to modern Malaysian literature and mourns the loss of Labuan.
