= Drama dari Krakatau =

1929 Malay novel by Kwee Tek Hoay

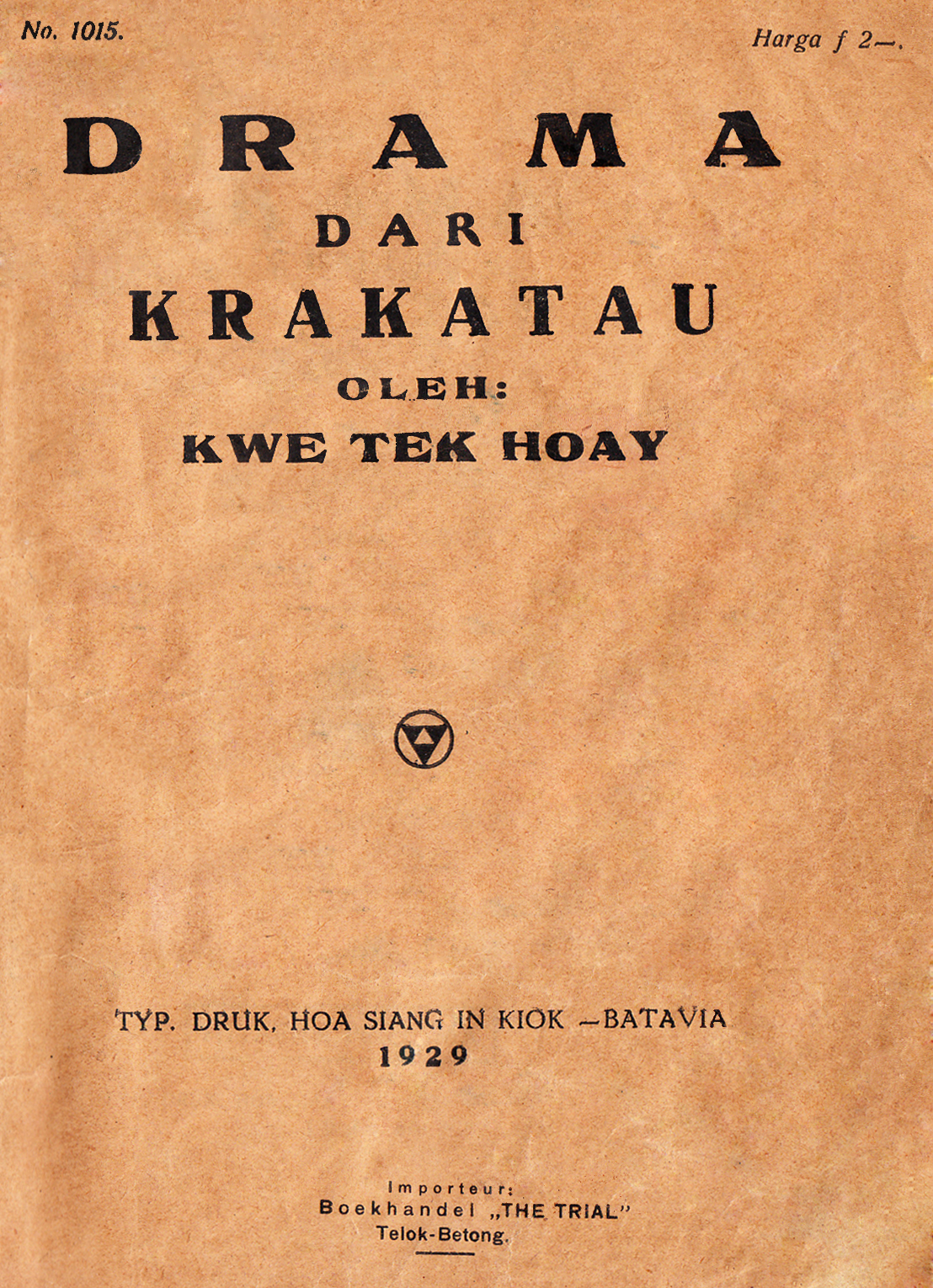
- Cover, first printing (1929)
- Author: Kwee Tek Hoay
- Language: Vernacular Malay
- Published: 1929
- Publisher: Hoa Siang In Kiok
- Publication place: Dutch East Indies
- Pages: 125
- OCLC: 64687346

Drama dari Krakatau ([ˈdrama daˈri kraˈkatau]; Drama of Krakatoa) is a 1929 vernacular Malay novel written by Kwee Tek Hoay. Inspired by Edward Bulwer-Lytton's 1834 novel The Last Days of Pompeii and the 1883 eruption of Krakatoa, the sixteen-chapter book centres on two families in 1920s West Java that are unknowingly tied together by siblings who were separated in 1883. The brother becomes a political figure, while the sister marries a Baduy priest-king. Ultimately, these families are reunited by the wedding of their children, after which the priest sacrifices himself to calm a stirring Krakatoa.

First published as a serial in Kwee's magazine Panorama between 7 April and 22 December 1928, Drama dari Krakatau was written over a period of two months after the author was asked to prepare a "sensational" story for a film. Before the final instalment had been published, the novel had already been adapted for the stage. Although Kwee was known as a realist and researched the volcano before writing, Drama dari Krakatau is replete with mysticism. Thematic analyses have focused on the depiction of indigenous cultures by Kwee (himself ethnic Chinese), as well as geography and nationalism. As with other works of Chinese Malay literature, the book is not considered part of the Indonesian literary canon.

== Plot ==
In 1883, Krakatoa begins stirring for the first time in 200 years. In the nearby village of Waringin, Sadidjah confides in her husband, village head Tjakra Amidjaja, that she has had a bad dream about the volcano; she fears that it will be their death. Tjakra Amidjaja consoles her, and tells her that they will leave the village in two days. In the meantime, the volcano grows increasingly violent and Tjakra Amidjaja and Sadidjah stay behind to manage the evacuation. They send their children, Hasan and Soerijati, to stay with family in Rangkas Gombong. (Note: Now part of Lebak Regency.) Krakatoa erupts several hours later. The village is wiped out in the resulting tsunami, and Soerijati is lost after she falls out of the carriage she is in; Hasan, however, arrives safely in Rangkas Gombong.

Forty-four years pass. Moelia, the son of the Regent of Rangkas Gombong and Assistant Wedana of Sindanglaut, (Note: Wedana was a government official. The Assistant Wedana was a mid-level position essentially the equivalent of a camat in modern-day Indonesia (Siegel 1997, p. 188). See Subdivisions of Indonesia for further information.) hears of a Baduy priest, Noesa Brama, who is curing the sick and injured. Moelia travels to Mount Ciwalirang to interview him, and finds Noesa Brama an intelligent and well-spoken man. Over lunch Moelia falls in love with the priest's daughter, Retna Sari. He learns that she must marry a man of equal standing to her father, one who is "no less than the Sultan of Yogyakarta or the Sunan of Solo". (Note: Original: "... tida ada lebih rendah dari Sultan Yokya atawa Sunan Solo".) Upon returning home, Moelia realises that Noesa Brama must be the last male descendant of the Hindu kings of Pajajaran, and that both Retna Sari and her mother bear a striking resemblance to his own grandmother. Several days later, he returned to the mountain and overhears a group of men from Palembang planning to kidnap Retna Sari. He chases them away, then briefly visits Noesa Brama before returning home. Though he attempts to forget Retna Sari, he is unable to do so.

The following week, the men from Palembang lie to the police, leading to Noesa Brama's arrest for planning a rebellion; the men then persuade Retna Sari and her mother to follow them to Sumatra. Learning of this, Moelia arranges for Noesa Brama's release. The priest returns home to find that his wife and daughter have gone – seemingly willingly – with the men from Palembang, while Moelia takes a steamboat and chases the kidnappers. Before he can stop them, Krakatoa erupts again, overturning the fleeing ship. Moelia barely has enough time to rescue the women before the mountain erupts a second time, killing the fugitives.

Moelia informs his father, revealed to be Hasan, of the eruptions, and the older man comes to his son's home. There he meets Retna Sari and her mother. They discover that Retna Sari's mother is Soerijati, explaining the familial resemblance. She reveals that she had been found and raised by Noesa Brama's father; she also tells of a statue of Vishnu in a cave atop Mount Ciwalirang with the inscription "At the time when I am damaged, the land and all your descendants will be destroyed, cursed by Rakata's anger", (Note: Original: "Pada saat aku rusak, rusaklah juga ini negri dengen sekalian turunanmu, katimpah murkanya Rakata". Translation by Kwee (1980, p. 84).) damage to which the priests believe caused the Krakatoa eruption. Unknown to them, Noesa Brama – enraged at the thought of his daughter marrying a commoner – has deliberately destroyed this statue by throwing it down a well, causing the eruption which stopped the fugitives.

Moelia and his family depart for Ciwalirang the following morning, hoping that Noesa Brama will consent to the marriage of Moelia and Retna Sari. The priest accepts the proposal, but expresses regret over the destruction of the statue after he discovers that Retna Sari and Soerijati had not gone willingly with the men from Palembang. He weds Moelia and Retna Sari and has them promise that their first son will be raised a Hindu and become king of the Baduy; he then surrenders all his power to his daughter. Later, hoping that his spirit and those of his ancestors can control the volcano, Noesa Brama secretly commits suicide by jumping into the well. Several weeks later, activity at the volcano drops, although it remains active.

== Writing ==
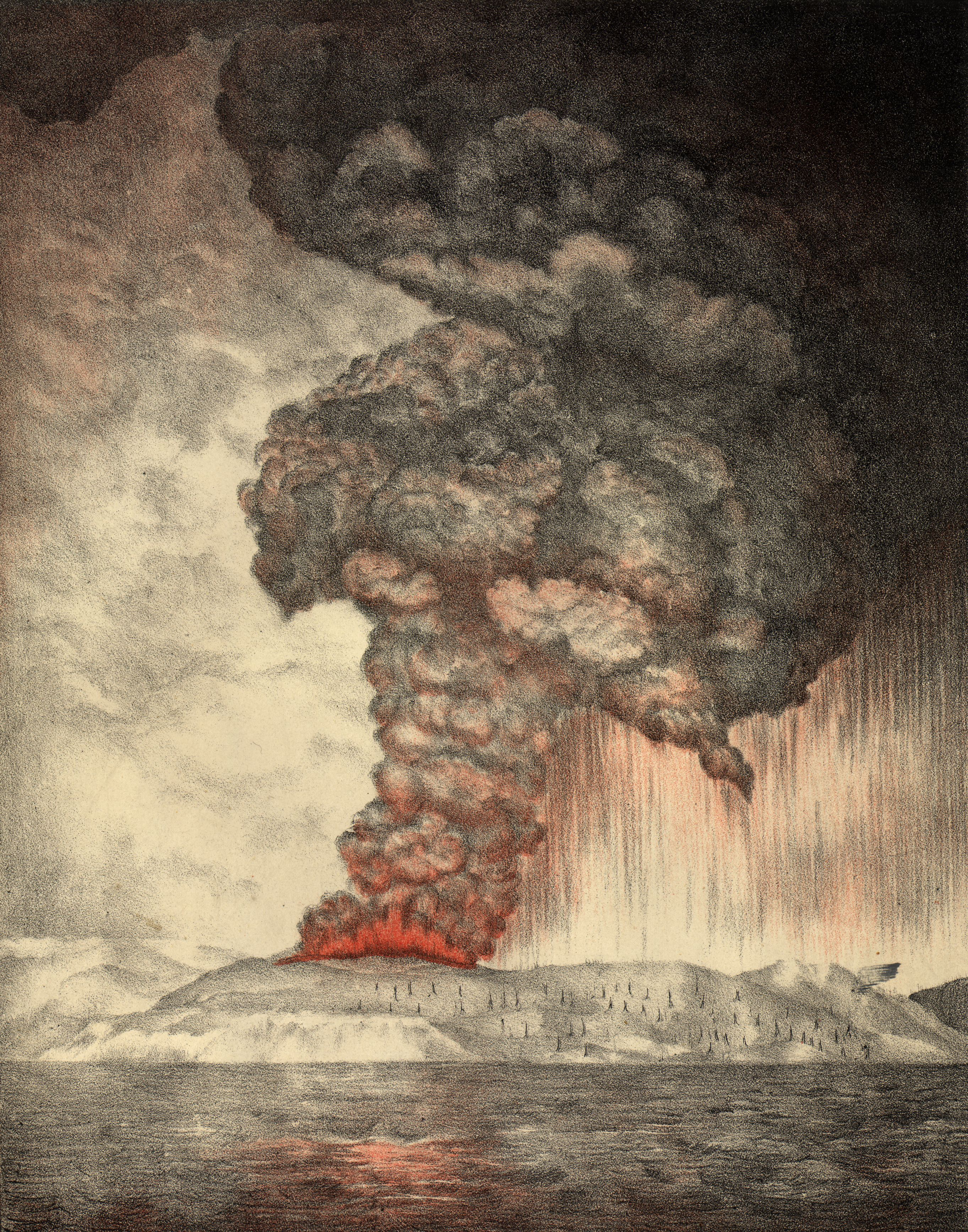
Kwee was inspired by the 1883 eruption of Krakatoa.

Drama dari Krakatau was written by the journalist Kwee Tek Hoay. Born to an ethnic Chinese textile merchant and his native wife, Kwee had been raised in the Chinese culture and educated at schools that focuses on preparing students for life in a modern world, as opposed to promoting tradition for its own sake. By the time he wrote the novel, Kwee was an active proponent of Buddhist teachings. He also wrote extensively on themes relating to the archipelago's indigenous population, and was a keen social observer. He read extensively in Dutch, English, and Malay and drew on these influences after becoming a writer. His first novel, Djadi Korbannja "Perempoean Hina" (The Victim of a "Contemptible Woman"), was published in 1924.

In 1928, Kwee was asked by a friend, who was hoping to establish a film company, to write a "sensational" story which could be used as the basis for a movie. (Note: No film with a similar title or plot is recorded; compare the list of films of the Dutch East Indies in Biran (2009, pp. 379–86).) Ongoing activity at Krakatoa was foremost in the author's mind and, after reading Edward Bulwer-Lytton's 1834 novel The Last Days of Pompeii, Kwee asked himself "is it impossible for one to write a drama about Krakatoa?" (Note: Original: "Mustahilkah orang tida bisa ciptaken satu drama dari Krakatau?") Owing to the length of time between the 1883 and 1928 eruptions, Kwee decided to begin his story with the separation of two young siblings. Further elements of the story were inspired by the mountain-dwelling Baduy, a group which tended to avoid outsiders and claimed to be descended from the Hindu kings of Pajajaran.

Kwee thought himself a realist, considering it "better to say things as they are, than to create events out of nothing, which although perhaps more entertaining and satisfying to viewers or readers, are falsehoods and lies, going against the truth." (Note: Original: "... lebih baek tuturkan kaadaan yang sabetulnya, dari pada ciptaken yang ada dalem angen-angen, yang meskipun ada lebih menyenangken dan mempuasken pada pembaca atau penonton, tapi palsu dan justa, bertentangan dengan kaadaan yang benar.") He was highly critical of contemporary writers who relied more on their fantasies than logic and truth. Hoping to keep his story grounded in reality, Kwee researched the history of the Baduy, the geological formation of Krakatoa, and the events of 1883 and 1928; in total he consulted 15 books, all in English or Dutch. The writing began on 19 March 1928 and was completed on 28 May of that year. Drama dari Krakatau consists of sixteen chapters, which were spread over 125 pages in the first printing.

== Themes ==
Although Kwee was a staunch supporter of realism in literature, Drama dari Krakatau includes a degree of mysticism, as evidenced by the apparent connection between the statue in the cave and the eruption of Krakatoa. Indeed, in many of his writings (both fiction and non-fiction), Kwee exhibited an interest in the occult; this includes writing detailed depictions of Therese Neumann, a fasting girl from Germany; and Omar Khayyám, a Persian Sufi mystic, philosopher and poet. The Indonesian literary critic Jakob Sumardjo finds the mystical elements (and the fact that no Hindu-era statues with inscriptions have been found) detract from the overall value of the novel.

Kwee's work is the earliest of three Chinese Malay novels which were inspired by volcanic eruptions. The second, Liem Khing Hoo's Meledaknja Goenoeng Keloet (The Eruption of Mount Kelud), was inspired by Kelud in East Java and was published in the monthly magazine Tjerita Roman in 1929. The third, Kwee's Drama dari Merapie (Drama of Merapi), was inspired by Central Java's Mount Merapi and was published as a serial in Moestika Romans from March to September 1931. Volcanic eruptions also featured in contemporary Chinese Malay poetry. Claudine Salmon records one syair, Ong Tjong Sian's Sair Petjanja Goenoeng Krakatau (Syair on the Eruption of Mount Krakatoa; 1929), as dealing with the community's fears after Krakatoa resumed activity.

Unlike many contemporary works by ethnic Chinese authors, Drama dari Krakatau features no Chinese characters in major roles; the only such characters are mentioned in passing, shopowners who provide emergency food supplies to the regent. Historically, Malay-language works by ethnic Chinese authors centred on Chinese characters, to the point that terms such as tanah-air (homeland) were often understood to mean mainland China, rather than the Malay Archipelago or Dutch East Indies. Chinese Malay works which featured exclusively indigenous characters had only developed in the 1920s. Uncommonly for ethnic Chinese writers of this period, Kwee attempts to centre the novel around indigenous people and present it from their perspective, "impersonating" these indigenous cultures through his narrative.

As with many stories with predominantly indigenous casts, Drama dari Krakatau is set in a rural area, far from the cities where the ethnic Chinese populace were concentrated. Geography plays a major role. The novel starts on a macro scale, depicting the origins of the archipelago from rising sea levels caused by the sinking of Poseidonis, then progresses increasingly towards the micro scale, passing through views of Java, Sumatra, and Krakatoa, before focusing on the home of Tjakra Amidjaja and the beginning of the plot. A later passage details the view from Mount Ciwalirang, showing Java, Krakatoa and Sumatra.

The Indonesian literary scholar Melani Budianta argues that this "geographic panorama", combined with the sympathetic depiction of other cultures and religions, shows elements of nationalism in the novel; such a theme has also been found in Kwee's Drama dari Boeven Digoel (Drama of Boeven Digoel; 1938). She writes that the panoramic views of the archipelago "help the readers to imagine the geography of a nation yet to be united", whereas the "impersonation" presents a "region of theosophy where religious difference is unified in the belief of goodness."

== Publication history and reception ==
Drama dari Krakatau was first published in serial form in Kwee's magazine Panorama, between 7 April and 22 December 1928. This serial was then published as a novel by Hoa Siang In Kiok in 1929. A new printing, adopting the 1972 spelling reform, was included in the second volume of Kesastraan Melayu Tionghoa dan Kebangsaan Indonesia, an anthology of Chinese Malay literature. This volume also included Kwee's novella Roema Sekola jang Saja Impiken (The Schoolhouse of My Dreams; 1925) and the novel Boenga Roos dari Tjikembang (The Rose of Cikembang; 1927).

As with Kwee's earlier work Boenga Roos dari Tjikembang, an adaptation of Drama dari Krakatau was performed on stage before its completion. On 28 March 1928, the Moon Opera performed Drama dari Krakatau at Pasar Senen in Weltevreden, Batavia (now Senen, Jakarta). The troupe performed the story again on 31 March and 5 April, the latter at Mangga Besar, Batavia. Kwee prepared the story for the performances, abbreviating and simplifying it for the stage. One of the main difficulties, he wrote, was presenting Krakatoa on stage: it was a technical challenge, yet could not be abandoned as "performing this play without showing the eruption of Krakatoa would be like performing Hamlet without the Prince of Denmark." (Note: Original: "maenken ini drama zonder kasih liat meletusnya Krakatau ada sama juga seperti maenken lelakon Hamlet zonder ada itu Prins dari Denemarken.")

As with all works written in vernacular Malay, the novel has not been considered part of the Indonesian literary canon. In his doctoral thesis, J. Francisco B. Benitez posits a socio-political cause for this. The Dutch colonial government used Court Malay as a "language of administration", a language for everyday dealings, while the Indonesian nationalists appropriated the language to help build a national culture. Chinese Malay literature, written in "low" Malay, was steadily marginalised. Sumardjo, however, sees a question of classification: though vernacular Malay was the lingua franca of the time, it was not Indonesian, and as such, he asks whether works in vernacular Malay should be classified as local literature, Indonesian literature, or simply Chinese Malay literature.

== Works cited ==
- Benitez, J. Francisco B. (2004). Awit and Syair: Alternative Subjectivities and Multiple Modernities in Nineteenth Century Insular Southeast Asia (Ph.D. thesis). Madison: University of Wisconsin. (subscription required)
- Biran, Misbach Yusa (2009). Sejarah Film 1900–1950: Bikin Film di Jawa [History of Film 1900–1950: Making Films in Java] (in Indonesian). Jakarta: Komunitas Bamboo working with the Jakarta Art Council. ISBN 978-979-3731-58-2.
- Budianta, Melani (2007). "Diverse Voices: Indonesian Literature and Nation-building". In Hock Guan Lee; Leo Suryadinata (eds.). Language, Nation and Development in Southeast Asia. Singapore: Institute of Southeast Asian Studies. pp. 51–73. ISBN 978-981-230-482-7.
- "Chinese-Indonesian writers told tales of life around them". The Jakarta Post. 26 May 2000. Archived from the original on 7 January 2014.
- Damono, Sapardi Djoko (2006). "Sebermula Adalah Realisme" [In the Beginning there was Realism]. In Lontar Foundation (ed.). Antologi Drama Indonesia 1895–1930 [Anthology of Indonesian Dramas 1895–1930] (in Indonesian). Jakarta: Lontar Foundation. pp. xvii–xxix. ISBN 978-979-99858-2-8.
- Kwee, John (1980). "Kwee Tek Hoay: A Productive Chinese Writer of Java (1880–1952)". Archipel. 19 (19): 81–92. doi:10.3406/arch.1980.1526.
- "Kwee Tek Hoay". Encyclopedia of Jakarta (in Indonesian). Jakarta City Government. Archived from the original on 28 August 2012.
- Kwee, Tek Hoay (2001a). "Permulaan Kata" [Foreword]. In A.S., Marcus; Benedanto, Pax (eds.). Kesastraan Melayu Tionghoa dan Kebangsaan Indonesia [Chinese Malay Literature and the Indonesian Nation] (in Indonesian). Vol. 2. Jakarta: Kepustakaan Populer Gramedia. pp. 428–34. ISBN 978-979-9023-45-2.
- Kwee, Tek Hoay (2001b). "Drama dari Krakatau" [Drama of Krakatoa]. In A.S., Marcus; Benedanto, Pax (eds.). Kesastraan Melayu Tionghoa dan Kebangsaan Indonesia [Chinese Malay Literature and the Indonesian Nation] (in Indonesian). Vol. 2. Jakarta: Kepustakaan Populer Gramedia. pp. 427–590. ISBN 978-979-9023-45-2.
- Nio, Joe Lan (1962). Sastera Indonesia-Tionghoa [Indonesian-Chinese Literature] (in Indonesian). Jakarta: Gunung Agung. OCLC 3094508.
- Salmon, Claudine (1985). Sastra Cina Peranakan dalam Bahasa Melayu [Peranakan Chinese Literature in the Malay Language] (in Indonesian). Jakarta: Balai Pustaka. OCLC 39909566.
- Sidharta, Myra (1989). "Daftar Karya Tulis Kwee Tek Hoay" [Bibliography of Kwee Tek Hoay]. In Sidharta, Myra (ed.). 100 Tahun Kwee Tek Hoay: Dari Penjaja Tekstil sampai ke Pendekar Pena [100 Years of Kwee Tek Hoay: From Textile Peddler to Pen-Wielding Warrior] (in Indonesian). Jakarta: Sinar Harapan. pp. 306–25. ISBN 978-979-416-040-4.
- Sidharta, Myra (1996). "Kwee Tek Hoay, Pengarang Serbabisa" [Kwee Tek Hoay, All-round Author]. In Suryadinata, Leo (ed.). Sastra Peranakan Tionghoa Indonesia [Indonesian Peranakan Chinese Literature] (in Indonesian). Jakarta: Grasindo. pp. 323–48. ISBN 978-979-553-855-4.
- Siegel, James T (1997). Fetish, Recognition, Revolution. Princeton: Princeton University Press. ISBN 978-0-691-02652-7.
- Sumardjo, Jakob (1989). "Kwee Tek Hoay Sebagai Sastrawan" [Kwee Tek Hoay as a Man of Letters]. In Sidharta, Myra (ed.). 100 Tahun Kwee Tek Hoay: Dari Penjaja Tekstil sampai ke Pendekar Pena [100 Years of Kwee Tek Hoay: From Textile Peddler to Pen-Wielding Warrior] (in Indonesian). Jakarta: Sinar Harapan. pp. 89–121. ISBN 978-979-416-040-4.
- Sutedja-Liem, Maya (2007). "De Roos uit Tjikembang". De Njai: Moeder van Alle Volken: 'De Roos uit Tjikembang' en Andere Verhalen [The Njai: Mother of All Peoples: 'De Roos uit Tjikembang' and Other Stories] (in Dutch). Leiden: KITLV. pp. 269–342. ISBN 978-90-6718-301-7.
