= Allah jang Palsoe =

Play written by Kwee Tek Hoay

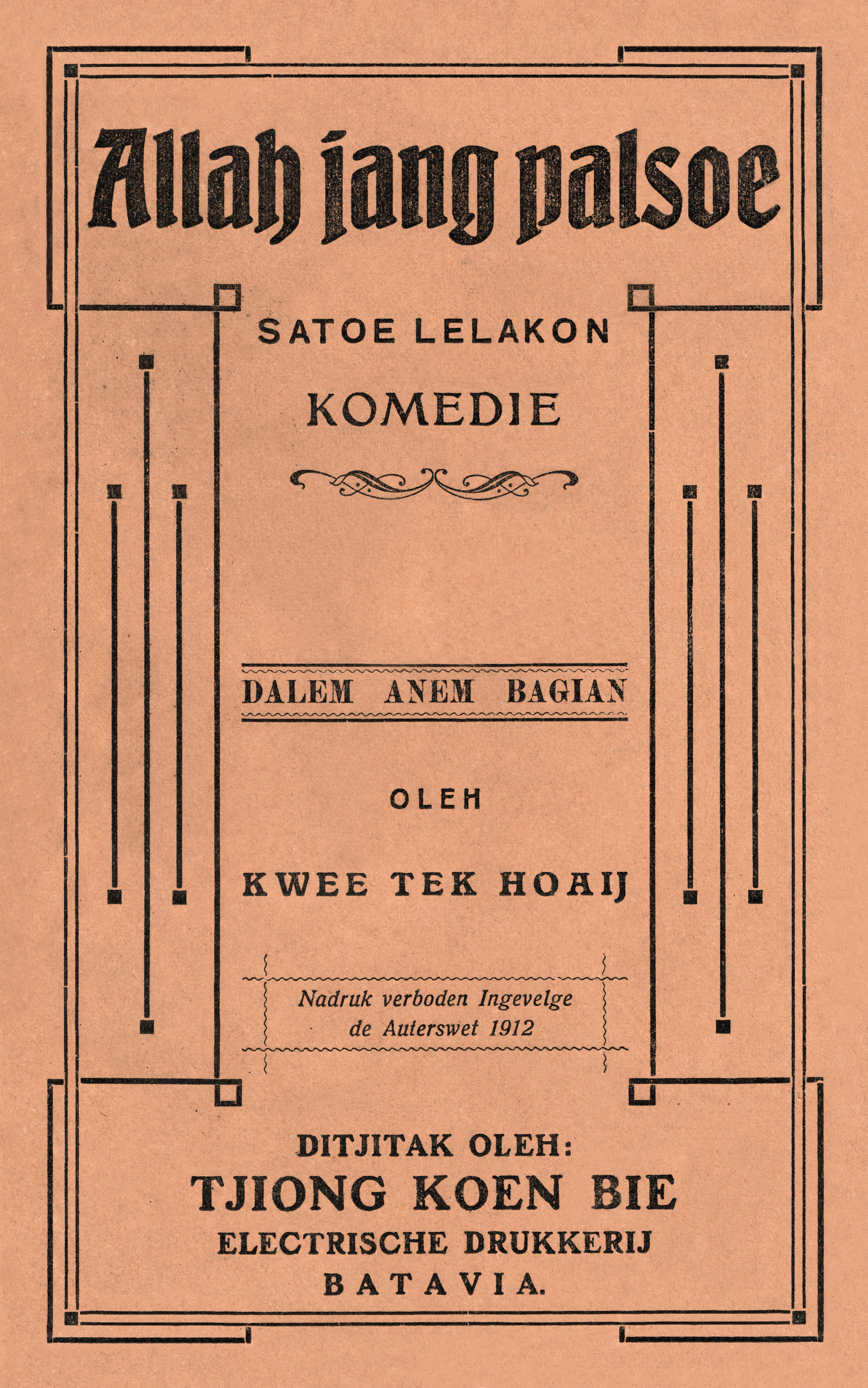
- Cover to the published stage play (first edition)
- Original language: Vernacular Malay
- Written by: Kwee Tek Hoay
- Characters: Tan Lauw Pe; Tan Kioe Lie; Tan Kioe Gie; Oeij Ijan Nio; Gouw Hap Nio; Tan Houw Nio
- Subject: Avarice

Premiere
- Date: 1919

Allah jang Palsoe ([ˌalah jaŋ ˈpalsu]; Perfected Spelling: Allah yang Palsu; Malay for The False God) is a 1919 stage drama from the Dutch East Indies that was written by the ethnic Chinese author Kwee Tek Hoay based on E. Phillips Oppenheim's short story "The False Gods". Over six acts, the Malay-language play follows two brothers, one a devout son who holds firmly to his morals and personal honour, while the other worships money and prioritises personal gain. Over more than a decade, the two learn that money (the titular false god) is not the path to happiness.

Kwee Tek Hoay's first stage play, Allah jang Palsoe was written as a realist response to whimsical contemporary theatres. Though the published stageplay sold poorly and the play was deemed difficult to perform, Allah jang Palsoe found success on the stage. By 1930 it had been performed by various ethnic Chinese troupes to popular acclaim and pioneered a body of work by authors such as Lauw Giok Lan, Tio Ie Soei, and Tjoa Tjien Mo. In 2006 the script for the play, which continues to be performed, was republished with updated spelling by the Lontar Foundation.

== Plot ==
Brothers Tan Kioe Lie and Tan Kioe Gie are preparing to leave their Cicuruk home to find work: Kioe Lie will go to Bandung, while Kioe Gie will go to Batavia (now Jakarta) and become a letter-setter. As they are packing, Kioe Lie's fiancée Gouw Hap Nio visits. She leaves some snacks with their father, the poor farmer Tan Lauw Pe, before going home, promising to take care of Pe while his sons are away. The brothers finish packing, say goodbye to their father, and head for the train station.

Three years later, Kioe Lie visits his brother in the latter's Batavia home. Kioe Gie has become an editor of the newspaper Kamadjoean and is known as a generous philanthropist. Kioe Lie, meanwhile, has become the manager of a tapioca factory, but is planning to leave for competing business run by Tjio Tam Bing, who has offered him twice the salary. Kioe Gie asks him to reconsider, or at least not take any customers, but Kioe Lie is set on his goals. Before Kioe Lie leaves, the brothers discuss marriage: since Kioe Lie has no intent to marry Hap Nio soon, Kioe Gie asks permission to marry first. Though Kioe Lie disapproves of Kioe Gie's sweetheart, a poor orphan girl named Oeij Ijan Nio, he agrees.

Another four years pass, and Kioe Gie has become editor-in-chief of Kamadjoean and married Ijan Nio. He is concerned, however, over the newspaper's new political orientation: the owner, Oeij Tjoan Siat, is aiming to make the paper pro-Dutch East Indies, a stance that Kioe Gie considers a betrayal to the ethnic Chinese. When Tjoan Siat comes to Kioe Gie's home to ask him to follow the former's new political leanings, heavily influenced by a monthly payment of 2,000 gulden offered by an unnamed political party, Kioe Gie refuses and resigns.

During the following week Kioe Gie and his wife sell their belongings and prepare to move back to Cicuruk. This departure is delayed by a visit from Kioe Lie, who reveals that he will be marrying Tam Bing's widow Tan Houw Nio – Tam Bing having died the year before. Kioe Gie is horrified, both because the widow has the same surname (Note: In Chinese tradition, such a relationship would be considered incest (Sidharta 1989, p. 59).) and because Kioe Lie had promised their father on his deathbed to marry Hap Nio. After an extensive argument, Kioe Lie disowns his brother and leaves.

Five years later, Kioe Lie and Houw Nio's marriage is failing. Owing to poor investments (some made with embezzled money), Houw Nio's gambling, and Kioe Lie's keeping of a mistress, they have lost their fortune. Kioe Lie tries to convince his wife to sell her jewellery, thus allowing him to return the stolen money. Houw Nio, however, refuses, tells him to sell the house and his mistress' jewellery, and then leaves. Soon afterwards, Kioe Lie's friend Tan Tiang An warns him that he will be arrested by the police unless he flees the colony. Together they rent a car and Kioe Lie heads for the port at Batavia.

Passing through Cicuruk, the car breaks down and, while the chauffeur attempts to fix it, Kioe Lie takes shelter in a nearby home. He learns that it belongs to Kioe Gie and Hap Nio, who have built up a vast farm, garden, and orchard that provide them with ample income. The two philanthropists are friends with the area's elite, and Hap Nio is happily married to a rich plantation administrator. When Kioe Gie and his companions return from playing tennis, they discover Kioe Lie hiding shamefully under a piano. Kioe Lie admits that he was wrong to be greedy. When a police officer arrives, Kioe Lie confesses to poisoning Tam Bing, then runs outside and shoots himself.

== Characters ==
- Tan Lauw Pe, a poor farmer
- Tan Kioe Lie, eldest son of Tan Lauw Pe
- Tan Kioe Gie, second son of Tan Lauw Pe
- Oeij Ijan Nio, wife of Tan Kioe Gie
- Gouw Hap Nio, fiancée of Tan Kioe Lie and later wife of Khouw Beng Sien
- Tan Houw Nio, wife of Tan Kioe Lie
- Khouw Beng Sien, administrator of the Goenoeng Moestika plantation
- Oeij Tjoan Siat, owner of the newspaper Kemadjoean
- Tan Tiang An, a Mayor Cina
- Saina, servant of Tan Houw Nio
- Servants of Tan Kioe Lie and Tan Kioe Gie
- Sado, a coachman
- Chauffeur

== Writing ==
Stage designs for Allah jang Palsoe by Kwee Tek Hoay; illustrations by "Oey"

Allah jang Palsoe was the first stage play by the journalist Kwee Tek Hoay. Born to an ethnic Chinese textile merchant and his wife, Kwee was raised in Chinese culture and schools that focused on modernity. By the time he wrote the drama, Kwee Tek Hoay was an active proponent of Buddhist theology. However, he also wrote extensively on themes relating to the native population of the archipelago and was a keen social observer. He read extensively in Dutch, English, and Malay, and drew on these readings after becoming a writer.

According to the historian Nio Joe Lan, Allah jang Palsoe was the first stage drama in Malay by a Chinese writer. (Note: Kwee Tek Hoay, in his foreword to the first edition of the stage play, made a similar assertion. He stated that, as of July 1919, only three printed scripts of stage dramas were available in Malay: Kapitein Item, Raden Beij Soerio Retno (F. Wiggers) and Karina Adinda (Victor Ido, translated by Lauw Giok Lan). None of these focused specifically on the ethnic Chinese in the Indies. The first dealt with the Spanish occupation of the Netherlands, while the latter two were set among the Javanese gentry (Kwee 1919, p. ix).) The six-act work was written in vernacular Malay, the lingua franca of the Indies, and was based on E. Phillips Oppenheim's short story "The False Gods". Though in his foreword Kwee Tek Hoay apologised for the quality of the stage play, writing that "the content and arrangement of this book are far from what you could call neat", (Note: Original: "... isi dan atoerannja ini boekoe ada djaoe dari pada boleh dibilang rapi...") Sumardjo praises his language, feeling that the story flowed well.

At the time Allah jang Palsoe was written, stage performances were heavily influenced by orality. Contemporary theatres, such as bangsawan and stamboel, were unscripted and generally used fantastic settings and plotlines. (Note: The bangsawan or komedi bangsawan originated in Penang, British Malaya, in the 1870s and became popular in the Dutch East Indies in the late 19th century. The stamboel (from the word Istanbul) or komedi stamboel was a genre which originated in Surabaya, Dutch East Indies, in 1891, and built upon the bangsawan. Both types of theatre featured extensive song and dance as part of the story proper or between scenes. The majority of stories staged by bangsawan troupes originated from the Malay hikayat and were set in palaces, whereas stamboel troupes' repertoires were replete with stories of Arabic origin, particularly from the One Thousand and One Nights. Troupes of both types, however, could and did stage stories of other kinds, including adaptations of Shakespeare, Chinese legends, and contemporary literature (Sumardjo 1992, pp. 102–109).) Kwee Tek Hoay heavily disapproved of such whimsy, considering it "better to say things as they are, than to create events out of nothing, which although perhaps more entertaining and satisfying to viewers or readers, are falsehoods and lies, going against the truth". (Note: Original: "... lebih baek tuturkan kaadaan yang sabetulnya, dari pada ciptaken yang ada dalem angen-angen, yang meskipun ada lebih menyenangken dan mempuasken pada pembaca atau penonton, tapi palsu dan justa, bertentangan dengan kaadaan yang benar.") After condemning contemporary playwrights who merely wrote down existing stories, Kwee Tek Hoay expressed the hope that ultimately a unique form of Chinese Malay theatre—inspired by European theatrical traditions but dealing with Chinese themes—could be developed. Allah jang Palsoe was intended to be the first published stage play in this new tradition.

Kwee Tek Hoay made numerous recommendations for the play's casting, costuming, setting, and music. He wrote that if sufficiently talented actors to portray Kioe Lie and Kioe Gie could not be found, "it would be better to not perform this show", (Note: Original "... lebih baek ini lelakon djangan dipertoendjoekkan.") and that Ijan Nio needed to show "a perfect woman or wife", (Note: Original: "... sifat jang sampoerna dari satoe prampoewan atawa satoe istri.") as opposed to the "fierce and rough" (Note: Original: "... galak dan kasar".) Houw Nio. He provided four set designs, to be used at appropriate points in the plot, and gave suggestions for setting up the needed backgrounds and props. Kwee recommended that the play include only one song, John Payne and Henry Bishop's "Home! Sweet Home!", which was to be performed in the sixth act with either English or Malay vocals and a trio of piano, viola, and guitar or mandolin.

== Analysis ==
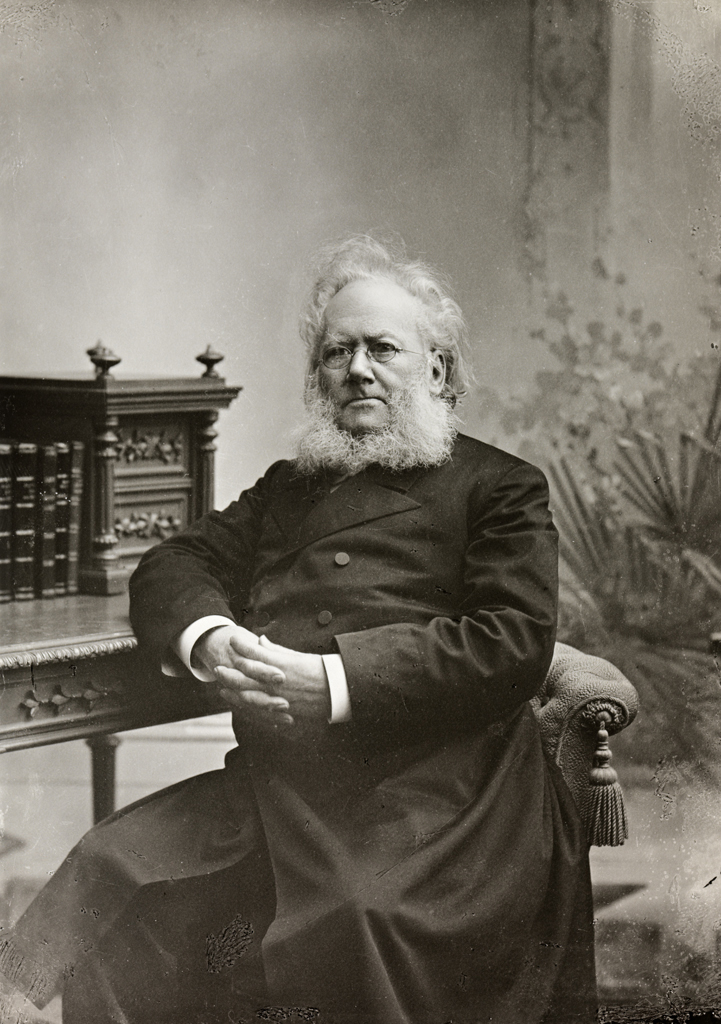
The style of Allah jang Palsoe was inspired by the realism of Henrik Ibsen.

The title Allah jang Palsoe is a reference to money, with an underlying didactic message that money is not everything in the world, and that an unquenchable thirst for it would turn one into "a money animal". Throughout the dialogue, money is referred to as the false God, with Lie as a character who deifies money to the point of ignoring his other duties and only realising his error after it is too late. Gie, although he does become rich, does not consider money a god, but is a philanthropist and holds to his morals. The Indonesian literary critic Sapardi Djoko Damono writes that such a message would have been popular among ethnic Chinese of the contemporary Indies, and as such the play would have been a favourite of social organisations.

The Indonesian literary critic Jakob Sumardjo likewise notes money as the central issue of Allah jang Palsoe, writing that the play shows individuals doing anything to earn it—even sacrificing their values. He writes that the corrupting nature of money remains present in the best of times, and considers Kwee Tek Hoay's message to have been too heavily based in morality rather than considerations of social and human factors. As a result, he writes, readers are brought to understand the lust for money as a "human illness" (Note: Original: "penyakit kemanusiaan") which must be overcome: they should follow the example of Tan Kioe Gie, not Tan Kioe Lie. John Kwee of the University of Auckland, citing Gie's departure from Kamadjoean, suggests that this was a challenge directed at the Chinese Malay press, then becoming increasingly commercial.

Allah jang Palsoe also contains themes unrelated to money. The sinologist Thomas Rieger notes the presence of a Chinese national identity, pointing to Gie as a young man "excelling in all Confucianist values", leaving his comfortable job rather than becoming an apologist for the Dutch colonial government to the detriment of his ethnic Chinese peers. Another sinologist, Myra Sidharta, looks at Kwee Tek Hoay's view of women. She writes that his depiction of an ideal woman was not yet fully developed in Allah jang Palsoe, though she finds Houw Nio to be a depiction of how a woman should not act: selfish and addicted to gambling.

In a preface to his 1926 drama Korbannja Kong-Ek (The Victim of Kong-Ek), Kwee Tek Hoay wrote that he had drawn inspiration from the realist Norwegian playwright Henrik Ibsen in that work, having read and reread the author's plays. Damono finds signs of Ibsen's influence already present in Allah jang Palsoe. He compares the stage directions in Allah jang Palsoe to those in Ibsen's Hedda Gabler and finds them to be similar in their level of detail.

== Release and reception ==
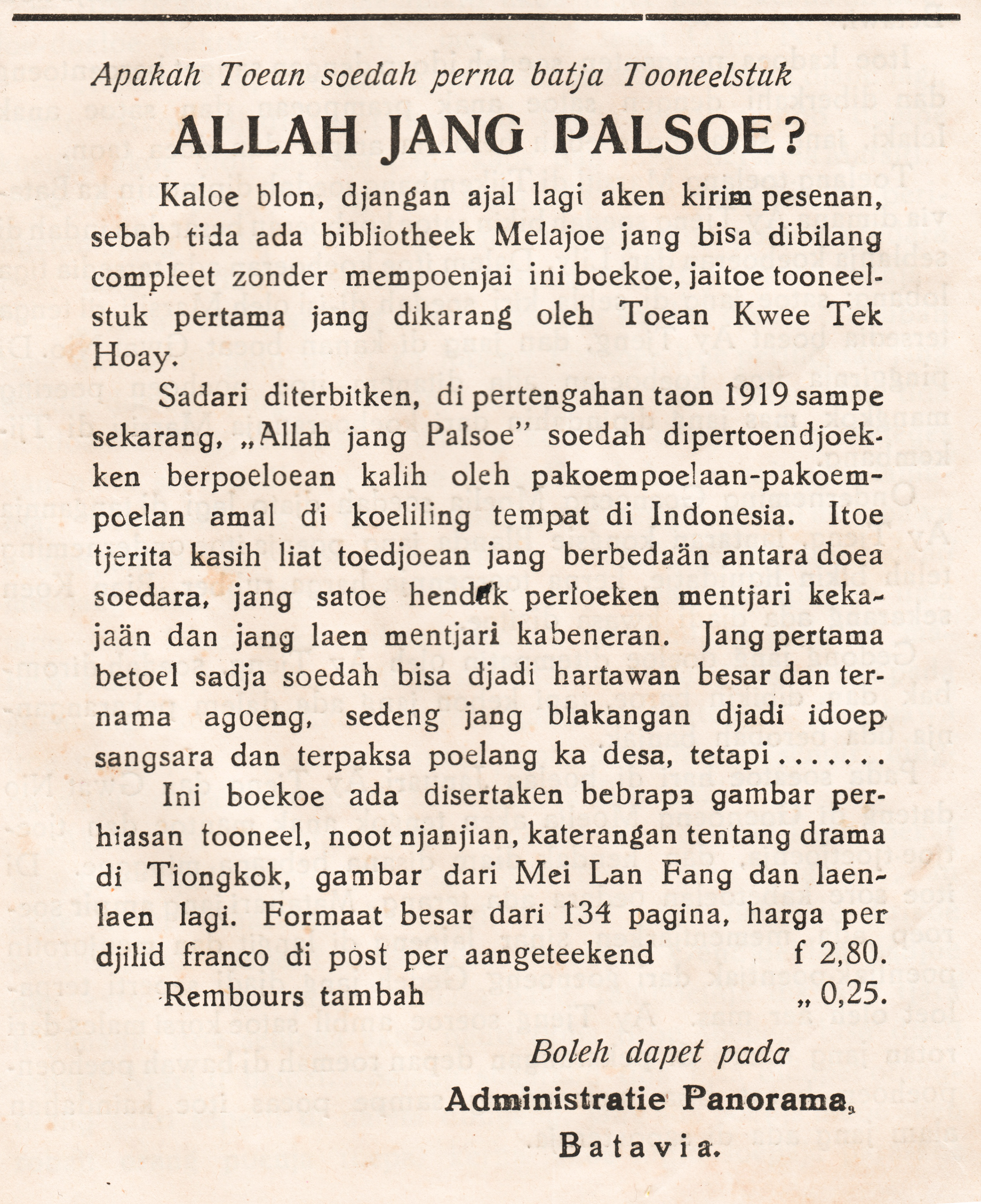
An advertisement for the published script, included in the 1930 printing of Boenga Roos dari Tjikembang

The script for Allah jang Palsoe was released by the Batavia-based publisher Tjiong Koen Bie in mid-1919. This edition included a foreword from the author, four illustrations of recommended stage decor, a number of performance guidelines, and a brief outline of the state of the theatre among the ethnic Chinese. Kwee Tek Hoay paid for this printing, a run of 1,000 copies, out of his own pocket and saw large financial losses. The stage play was republished in 2006, using the Perfected Spelling System, as part of the first volume of the Lontar Foundation's anthology of Indonesian stage dramas.

Allah jang Palsoe was well received and broadly adopted. Troupes were allowed to perform the play as a charity opera, (Note: Original: "opera derma". This type of stage drama, also known as Cu Tee Hie, was inspired by the stamboel and generally sponsored by Chinese-backed organizations for fundraising. Such plays were performed by amateur actors in the Betawi Malay dialect. Stories were generally inspired by Chinese legends, tales popular on the stamboel stage, and European theatre (Sumardjo 1992, pp. 110–112).) though proceeds were to go to the Tiong Hoa Hwee Koan branch in Bogor. One performance is recorded as garnering 10,000 gulden. According to an advertisement, by 1930 the play had been performed "tens of times" and was popular with ethnic Chinese theatre troupes.

Kwee Tek Hoay received numerous letters from fans of Allah jang Palsoe, spurring him to continue writing. Considering the play too difficult for native troupes to stage, when one such troupe, the Union Dalia Opera, requested permission to perform it, Kwee Tek Hoay instead wrote a new story for them. This later became his best-selling novel Boenga Roos dari Tjikembang (The Rose of Cikembang). Another of Kwee Tek Hoay's stage dramas, Korbannja Kong-Ek, was inspired by a friend, who wrote him a letter asking for another comforting and educational play after reading Allah jang Palsoe.

In 1926 Kwee Tek Hoay wrote that, after Allah jang Palsoe, the quality of stage performances in the Indies had increased noticeably. Nio notes that the quantity of stage plays by ethnic Chinese authors likewise increased. Though not many were ultimately published, the body of work pioneered by Allah jang Palsoe included plays by Kwee Tek Hoay (Korbannja Kong-Ek, Mait Hidoep, Plesiran Hari Minggoe), Lauw Giok Lan (Pendidikan jang Kliroe), Tio Ie Soei (Jan Tio), and Tjoa Tjien Mo (Beng Lee Koen, Hsi Shih).

Sumardjo writes that, though Allah jang Palsoe was published seven years before the Rustam Effendi's Bebasari (generally considered the first canonic Indonesian stage drama), Kwee Tek Hoay's writing shows all the hallmarks of a literary work. Though the drama is not considered part of the Indonesian literary canon, (Note: The same holds true for all works of Chinese-Malay literature. In his doctoral thesis, J. Francisco B. Benitez posits a socio-political cause for this. The Dutch colonial government used Court Malay as a "language of administration", a language for everyday dealings, while the Indonesian nationalists appropriated the language to help build a national culture. Chinese Malay literature, written in "low" Malay, was steadily marginalised (Benitez 2004, pp. 82–83). Sumardjo, however, sees it as a question of classification: though vernacular Malay was the lingua franca of the time, it was not Indonesian, and as such, he asks whether works in vernacular Malay should be classified as local literature, Indonesian literature, or simply Chinese Malay literature (Sumardjo 1989, p. 100).) performances have continued into the 21st century. In May 2003, the Jakarta-based Mainteater put on an abridged performance directed by E. Sumadiningrat. Another Jakarta-based troupe, Teater Bejana, has included it in their repertoire.

== Works cited ==
- Arjanto, Dwi (1 June 2003). "Keserakahan yang (Pasti) Tenggelam" [Greed which will (Surely) Sink]. Tempo (in Indonesian): 102–103.
- Benitez, J. Francisco B. (2004). Awit and Syair: Alternative Subjectivities and Multiple Modernities in Nineteenth Century Insular Southeast Asia (PhD thesis). Madison: University of Wisconsin. (subscription required)
- "Chinese-Indonesian writers told tales of life around them". The Jakarta Post. 26 May 2000. Archived from the original on 7 January 2014.
- Damono, Sapardi Djoko (2006). "Sebermula Adalah Realisme" [In the Beginning there was Realism]. In Lontar Foundation (ed.). Antologi Drama Indonesia 1895–1930 [Anthology of Indonesian Dramas 1895–1930] (in Indonesian). Jakarta: Lontar Foundation. pp. xvii–xxix. ISBN 978-979-99858-2-8.
- Lontar Foundation, ed. (2006). Antologi Drama Indonesia 1895–1930 [Anthology of Indonesian Dramas 1895–1930] (in Indonesian). Jakarta: Lontar Foundation. ISBN 978-979-99858-2-8.
- Kwee, John (1980). "Kwee Tek Hoay: A Productive Chinese Writer of Java (1880–1952)". Archipel. 19: 81–92. doi:10.3406/arch.1980.1526.
- Kwee, John (1989). "Kwee Tek Hoay, Sang Dramawan" [Kwee Tek Hoay, the Dramatist]. In Sidharta, Myra (ed.). 100 Tahun Kwee Tek Hoay: Dari Penjaja Tekstil sampai ke Pendekar Pena [100 Years of Kwee Tek Hoay: From Textile Peddler to Pen-Wielding Warrior] (in Indonesian). Jakarta: Sinar Harapan. pp. 166–179. ISBN 978-979-416-040-4.
- "Kwee Tek Hoay". Encyclopedia of Jakarta (in Indonesian). Jakarta City Government. Archived from the original on 28 August 2012.
- Kwee, Tek Hoay (1919). Allah jang Palsoe [The False God] (in Malay). Batavia: Tjiong Koen Bie.
- Kwee, Tek Hoay (1930). Boenga Roos dari Tjikembang [The Rose of Tjikembang] (in Malay). Batavia: Panorama.
- Kwee, Tek Hoay (2001). "Bunga Roos dari Cikembang" [The Rose of Cikembang]. In A.S., Marcus; Benedanto, Pax (eds.). Kesastraan Melayu Tionghoa dan Kebangsaan Indonesia [Chinese Malay Literature and the Indonesian Nation] (in Indonesian). Vol. 2. Jakarta: Kepustakaan Populer Gramedia. pp. 297–425. ISBN 978-979-9023-45-2.
- Kwee, Tek Hoay (2002). "Korbannya Kong-Ek" [The Victim of the Chinese Association]. In A.S., Marcus; Benedanto, Pax (eds.). Kesastraan Melayu Tionghoa dan Kebangsaan Indonesia [Chinese Malay Literature and the Indonesian Nation] (in Indonesian). Vol. 6. Jakarta: Kepustakaan Populer Gramedia. pp. 1–108. ISBN 978-979-9023-82-7.
- Nio, Joe Lan (1962). Sastera Indonesia-Tionghoa [Indonesian-Chinese Literature] (in Indonesian). Jakarta: Gunung Agung. OCLC 3094508.
- Rieger, Thomas (1996). "From Huaqiao to Minzu: Constructing New Identities in Indonesia's Peranakan-Chinese Literature". In Littrup, Lisbeth (ed.). Identity in Asian Literature. Surrey: Curzon Press. pp. 151–172. ISBN 978-0-7007-0367-8.
- Safinaz, Debbi; Ismono, Henry (22 January 2012). "Mempertahankan Jejak Tionghoa dalam Seni" [Maintaining Traces of China in Art]. Tabloid Nova (in Indonesian). Archived from the original on 8 January 2016.
- Sidharta, Myra (1989). "Bunga-Bunga di Taman Mustika: Pandangan Kwee Tek Hoay Terhadap Wanita dan Soal-soal Kewanitaan" [Flowers in the Bejeweled Garden: Kwee Tek Hoay's Views on Women and Related Issues]. In Sidharta, Myra (ed.). 100 Tahun Kwee Tek Hoay: Dari Penjaja Tekstil sampai ke Pendekar Pena [100 Years of Kwee Tek Hoay: From Textile Peddler to Pen-Wielding Warrior] (in Indonesian). Jakarta: Sinar Harapan. pp. 55–82. ISBN 978-979-416-040-4.
- Sidharta, Myra (1996). "Kwee Tek Hoay, Pengarang Serbabisa" [Kwee Tek Hoay, All-round Author]. In Suryadinata, Leo (ed.). Sastra Peranakan Tionghoa Indonesia [Indonesian Peranakan Chinese Literature] (in Indonesian). Jakarta: Grasindo. pp. 323–348.
- Sumardjo, Jakob (1989). "Kwee Tek Hoay Sebagai Sastrawan" [Kwee Tek Hoay as a Man of Letters]. In Sidharta, Myra (ed.). 100 Tahun Kwee Tek Hoay: Dari Penjaja Tekstil sampai ke Pendekar Pena [100 Years of Kwee Tek Hoay: From Textile Peddler to Pen-Wielding Warrior] (in Indonesian). Jakarta: Sinar Harapan. pp. 89–121. ISBN 978-979-416-040-4.
- Sumardjo, Jakob (1992). Perkembangan Teater Modern dan Sastra Drama Indonesia [Development of Modern Theatre and Literary Drama in Indonesia] (in Indonesian). Bandung: Citra Aditya Bakti. ISBN 978-979-414-615-6.
- Sumardjo, Jakob (2004). Kesusastraan Melayu Rendah [Low Malay Literature] (in Indonesian). Yogyakarta: Galang Press. ISBN 978-979-3627-16-8.
