= Boenga Roos dari Tjikembang =

Boenga Roos dari Tjikembang may refer to:

- Boenga Roos dari Tjikembang (novel), a novel by Indonesian author Kwee Tek Hoay
- Boenga Roos dari Tjikembang (film), a film by Indonesian director The Teng Chun
