= List of works by Kwee Tek Hoay =

Kwee Tek Hoay bibliography
- Non-fiction books and serials↙: 36
- Fiction books and serials↙: 26
- Magazines↙: 5
- Stage plays↙: 11
- Translations↙: 15

Chinese-Indonesian author Kwee Tek Hoay (1886–1951) wrote 62 books or serials (36 non-fiction and 26 fiction), 3 essays, and 11 stage plays. He also edited 5 magazines and translated 15 books or other writings. Aside from these works, listed below, he is known to have written numerous reports, obituaries, articles, and film reviews as a magazine editor. Many of Kwee's religious books (as well as some novels) were reprinted by the Surakarta-based publisher Swastika in the early 1960s. Several further books were reprinted in commemoration of the 100th anniversary of Kwee's birth. In the 2000s, ten of his works were reprinted as part of the Kesastraan Melayu Tionghoa dan Kebangsaan Indonesia series. Two of his works, the novel Boenga Roos dari Tjikembang (1927) and the study Atsal Moelanja Timboel Pergerakan Tionghoa di Indonesia (1936/37), have been translated into English.

Kwee began his writing career in 1919 with the stage play Allah jang Palsoe. During the 1920s, he wrote several novels and stage plays while also working as a journalist, first for Sin Po then for Sin Bin. He established his first magazine, Panorama, in 1925; he went on to manage four further magazines, including the literary-oriented Moestika Romans and the religious Sam Kauw Gwat Po. After 1930 Kwee began to focus predominantly on religious texts, particularly those related to Buddhism, Confucianism, and Chinese folk religion, but also relating to Islam. A fluent English speaker, Kwee adapted several of his writings – both fiction and non-fiction – from publications outside the Dutch East Indies. His last work before his death, seven volumes related to various aspects of Confucianism, was published in 1950.

Thematically, Chinese teachings and culture feature prominently in Kwee's works, in which reincarnation and mysticism are common. Criticism of the ethnic Chinese in the Indies is also present; Allah jang Palsoe, for instance, criticised the blind pursuit of money while ignoring cultural and societal norms, whilst the stageplay Korbannja Kong Ek criticised the management of the Tiong Hoa Hwee Koan and its schools.

The following list is divided into tables based on the type of works contained within. The tables are initially arranged alphabetically by title, although they are also sortable. Titles are in the original spelling, with a literal English translation underneath. Years given are for the first publication; later reprintings are not counted. Unless otherwise noted, this list is based on the one compiled by Sidharta (1989, pp. 306–25).

== Non-fiction books and serials ==
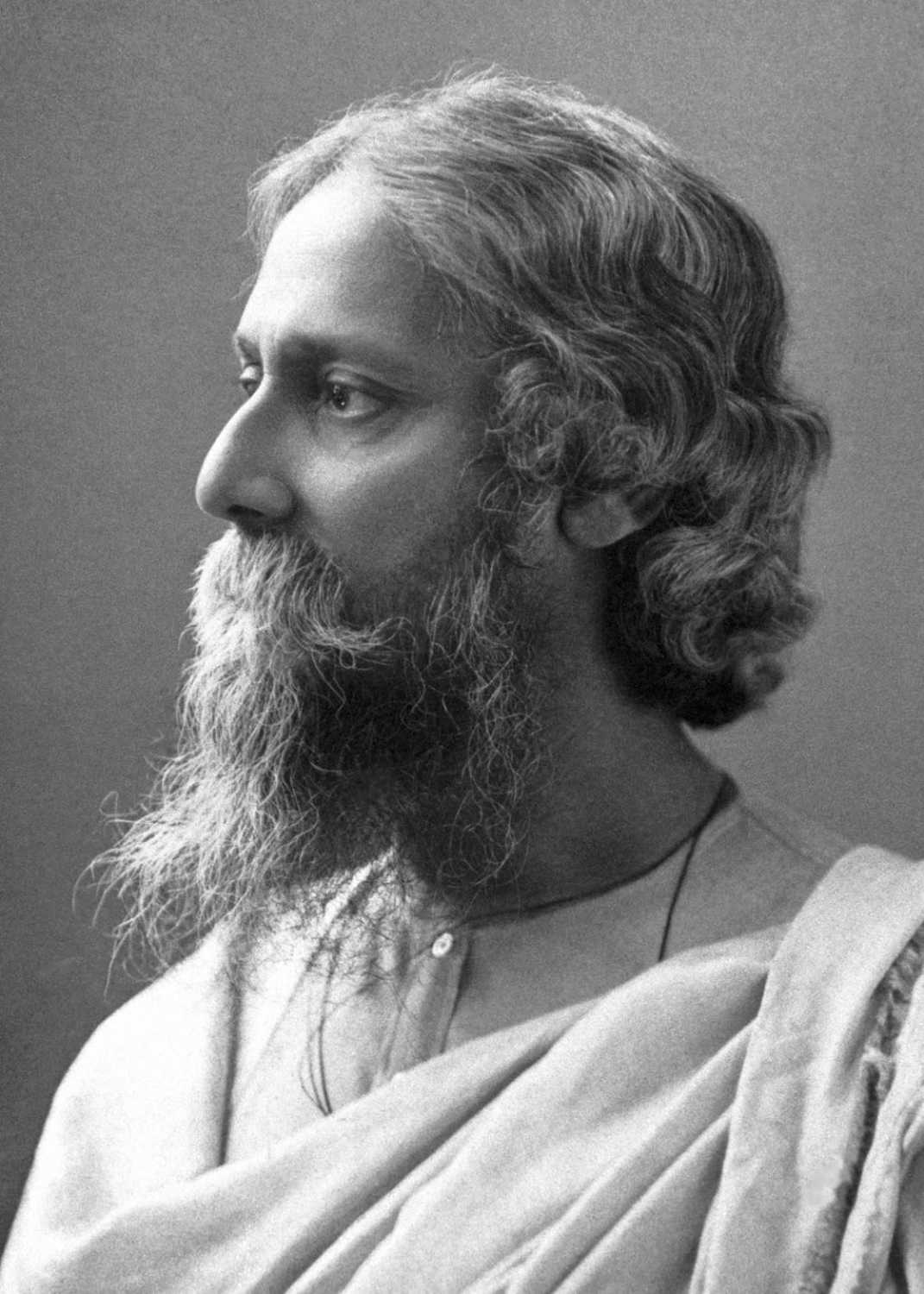
Among Kwee's works were biographies of Rabindranath Tagore

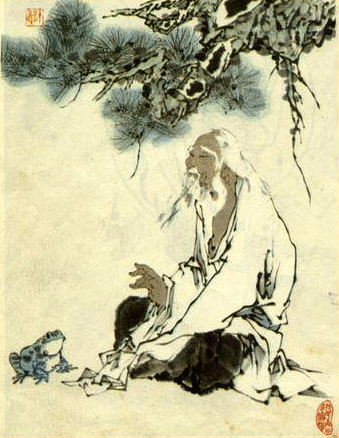
... Zhuangzi ...

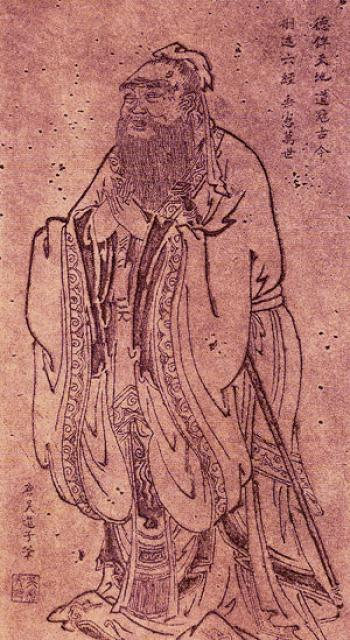
... and Confucius.

The non-fiction books and serials of Kwee Tek Hoay
Title	Year(s)	Publisher	Note(s)
Agama Griek Koeno The Ancient Greek Religion	1938	Moestika	
Apa Adanja Sam Kauw Itoe Tiga Peladjaran Agama jang Dianoet oleh Pendoedoek di Tiongkok Riboean Taoen Lamanja Of Sam Kauw, Those Three Teachings Followed by the People of China for Thousands of Years	1942	Moestika	
Atsal Moelanja Timboel Pergerakan Tionghoa di Indonesia The Origins of the Modern Chinese Movement in Indonesia	1936 to 1937	Moestika Romans	Translated into English by Lea Williams, 1969
Bebrapa Bagian Resia Kahidoepannja Kong Tjoe Some Secret Aspects of Confucius' Life	1941	Moestika	
Bimba Dewi (Yasodhara), Istrinja Prins Sidharta Bimba Dewi (Yasodhara), Wife of Prince Sidharta	c. 1938	Moestika	
Buddha Gautama Gautama Buddha	1931 to 1933	Moestika	Published in ten volumes
Chuang Tze dan Peladjarannja Chuang Tze and His Teachings	1941	Moestika	Regarding the teachings of Zhuangzi
Gadis Moedjidjat The Miracle Girl	1930	Moestika Panorama	Adapted from the story of Therese Neumann
General Chiang Kai Shek Waktoe Moeda dan Sebeloemnja Mendjadi Panglima Perang jang Paling Tinggi General Chiang Kai-shek as a Youth and Before Becoming the Commander in Chief	1941 to 1942	Moestika Romans	Published as a serial; details the early life of Chiang Kai-shek
Hikajat Penghidoepan dan Peladjarannja Nabi Khong Hoe Tjoe Life Story and Lessons of the Prophet Confucius	1935	Moestika	Collection of articles about Confucius
Hikajat Penghidoepan dan Perdjalanannja Padri Buddhist I Tsing Life and Journey of Buddhist Monk I Tsing	1935	Moestika	Story of Yijing, a Buddhist monk who went to India via Sumatra in the late seventh century
Hikajat Perang Annam Tale of the Annam War	1941	Moestika	
Ilmu Muziek dan Njanjian The Art of Music and Song	1950	Moestika	
Khong Kauw tentang Socialisme Confucianism on Socialism	1950	Moestika	
Khong Kauw tentang Soal Demokrasi Confucianism on Democracy	1950	Moestika	
Lao Tze dan Peladjarannja Lao Tze and His Teachings	1941	Moestika	Teachings of Laozi
Meditasi atau Mengeningkan Tjipta Meditation, or Calming Creation	1950	Moestika	
Occultisme atawa Peladjaran Gaib di Dalem Khong Kauw Occultism or Mystic Teachings in Confucianism	1950	Moestika	
Oedjar-oedjar Emas dari Buddha Golden Words from the Buddha	1949	Moestika	
Oedjar-oedjar Emas dari Buddha, Khong Tjoe, dan Lao Tze Golden Words from the Buddha, Confucius, and Lao Tze	1949	Moestika	
Oedjar-oedjar Emas dari Kong Hoe Tjoe Golden Words from Confucius	1949	Moestika	
Omong-omong tentang agama Buddha Discussion on Buddhism	1935	Moestika	Published in five volumes
Pa Hsien (Pat Sian) atawa Delapan Dewa-Dewa Pa Hsien (Pat Sian) or the Eight Gods	1939	Moestika	Discussion of the Eight Immortals
Peladjaran Buddha Lessons of the Buddha	1941	Moestika	
Pemandangan dari Fihak Sam Kauw tentang Sembahjangan Tionghoa dan Toedjoeannja Sam Kauw's Views on Chinese Prayer and Its Goals	1942	Moestika	
Pemandangan Khong Kauw tentang Machloek-Machloek Rohani atawa Kwie Sien Buddhism's View of Spirits or Kwie Sien	1950	Moestika	
Pemandangan Khong Tjoe tentang Kefaedahannja Sembahjang Confucius' View of the Uses of Prayer	1950	Moestika	
Pemilihan Dalai Lama dan Laen-laen Pendita Besar di Tibet Selection of the Dalai Lama and Other Great Monks of Tibet	1941	Moestika	
Rabindranath Tagore	1939	Moestika	Biography of Rabindranath Tagore
Reincarnatie dan Karma Reincarnation and Karma	c. 1938	Moestika	
Riwajat Bodhisattwa Avalokiteswara Dewi Tjinta Kasih atawa Kwan Im Story of the Goddess of Love or Guanyin	1941	Moestika	
Satoe Soeroehan Kepada Sekalian Orang Tionghoa jang Masih Mendjoendjoeng Sam Kauw atawa Agama Leloehoernja Sendiri A Command for All Chinese who Still Follow Sam Kauw or the Religion of Ancestors	1941	Moestika	
Sembahjang dan Meditatie Prayer and Meditation	1932	Moestika	
Theosofie dan Toedjoeannja Theosophy and Its Goals	c. 1938	Moestika	
Tiong Yong	1940	Moestika	
Yoga Tindak Permoelaan Early Steps in Yoga	1949	Moestika	

== Fiction books and serials ==
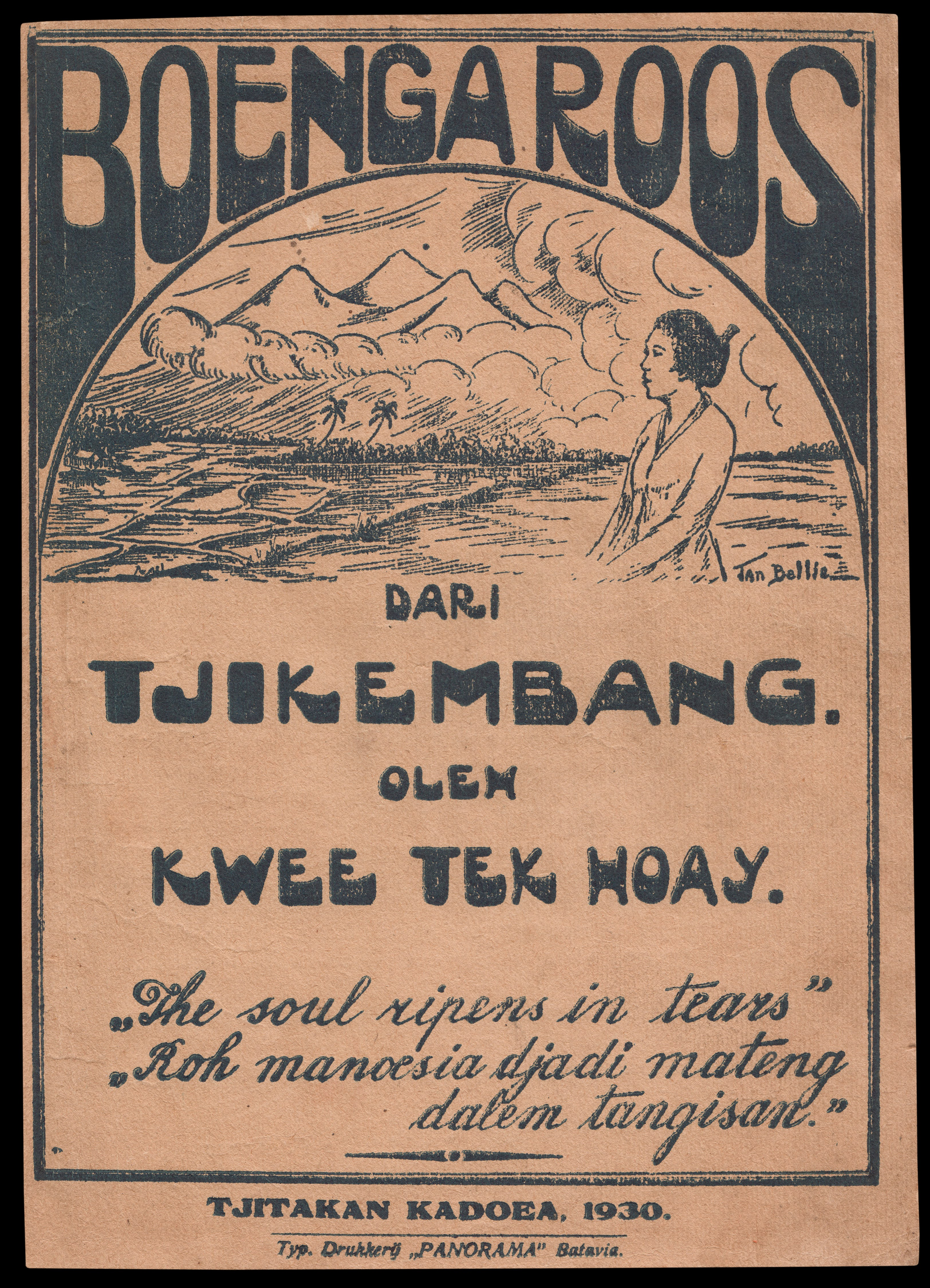
Boenga Roos dari Tjikembang (1927)

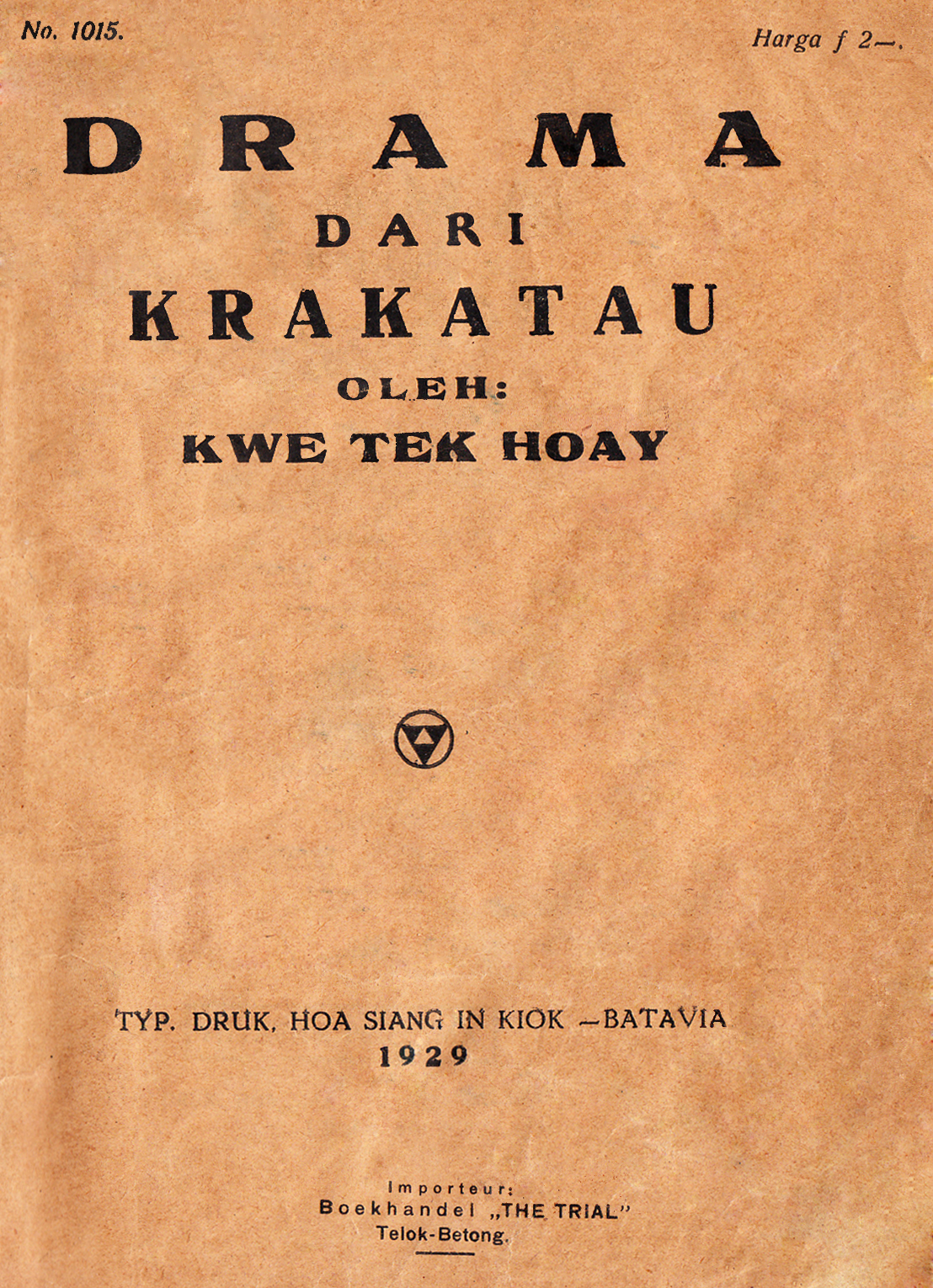
Drama dari Krakatau, 1928/1929

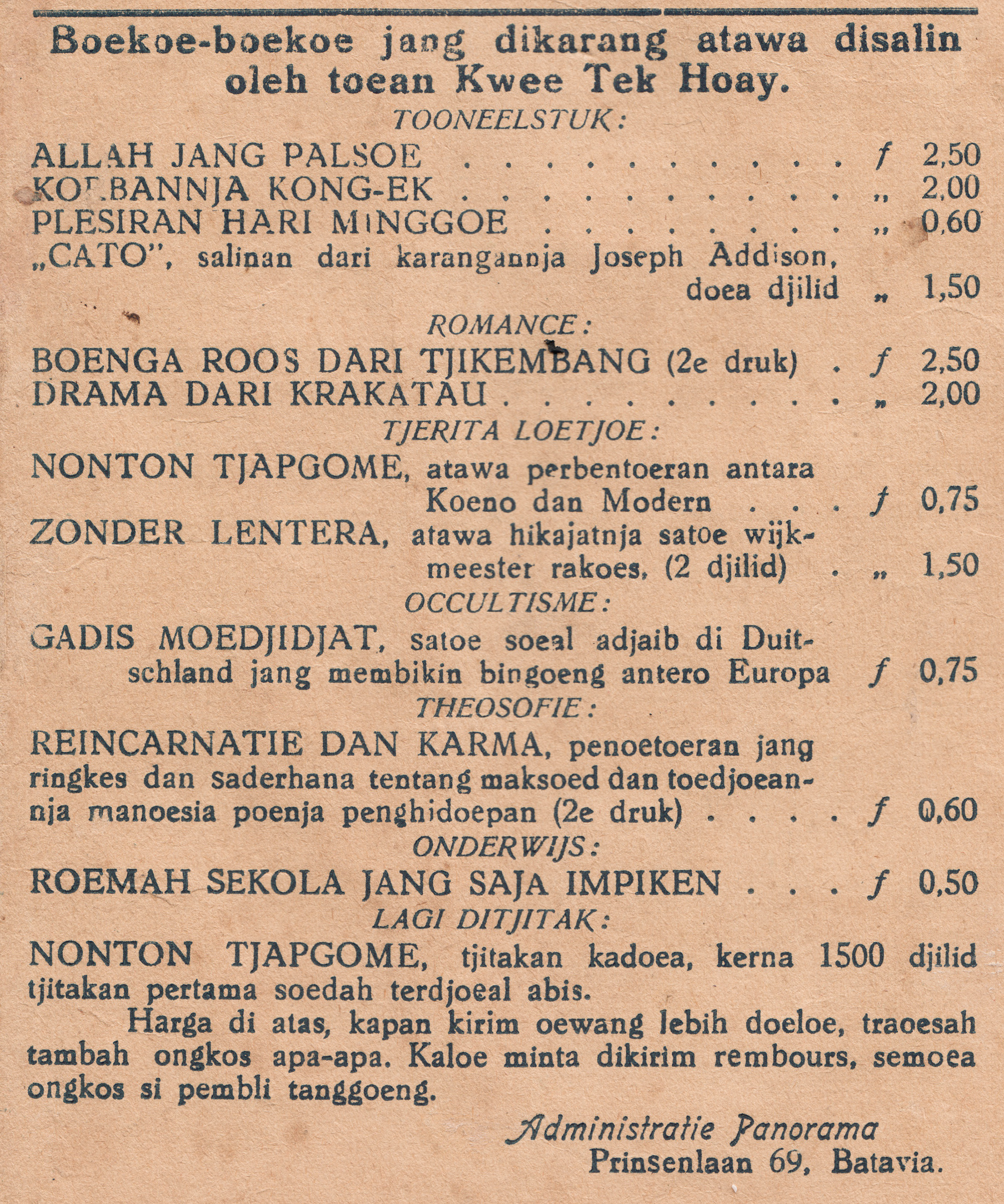
A 1930 list of works for sale by Kwee's Panorama magazine

The fiction books and serials of Kwee Tek Hoay
Title	Year(s)	Publisher	Note(s)
Anioto, atawa Matjan Totel Manoesia Anioto, or, the Human Leopard	1937	Moestika Romans	Published as a serial
Asepnjia Hio dan Kajoe Garoe The Smoke of Paper and Agarwood	1939 to 1940	Moestika Romans	Published as a serial
Bajangan dari Penghidoepan jang Laloe Shadows from a Past Life	1932 to 1938	Moestika Romans	Published as a serial
Berkahnja Malaise The Benefits of the Depression	1933 to 1935	Moestika Romans	Published as a serial
Boenga Roos dari Tjikembang The Rose of Cikembang	1927	Hoa Siang In Kiok	First published as a serial in Panorama, 1927; translated into English by George Fowler in 2013
Bouquet Panorama Bouquet from Panorama	1931	Panorama	Collection of 15 poems, including one translation
Djadi Korbannja "Perempoean-hina" The Victim of a "Contemptible Woman"	1924	Olt	
Djin Item dari Legok-Hondje The Black Jinn of Legok-Hondje	1935	Moestika Romans	
Doea Matjem Soerat Two Types of Letters	1937 to 1941	Moestika	Published in several instalments
Drama dari Krakatau Drama from Krakatoa	1929	Hoa Siang In Kiok	First published as a serial in Panorama, 1928
Drama dari Merapi Drama from Merapi	1931	Moestika Panorama	Published as a serial
Drama di Boeven Digoel Drama in Boeven Digoel	1938	Moestika	First published as a serial in Panorama, 15 December 1929 to 1 January 1932
Drama di Loro Ireng Drama at Loro Ireng	1934	Moestika	First published as a serial in Moestika Romans, November 1933 to March 1934
Itoe Nona jang Bertopeng Biroe The Lady in the Blue Mask	1941	Moestika	
Nonton Tjapgome Watching the Lantern Festival	1930	Moestika Panorama	
Pendekar dari Chapei The Warrior from Chapei	1932	Moestika Panorama	Published as a serial, March to November
Pengalaman Satoe Boenga Anjelir Experiences of a Carnation	1938	Moestika Romans	
Penghidoepannja Satoe Sri Panggoeng Life of a Stage Star	1930 to 1931	Moestika Panorama	
Peringetan dari Tempo Doeloe Memory from the Past	1941	Moestika	First published as a serial, 1940 to 1941
Resia dari Kekajahannja Loh Hua di Soerabaja The Secret of Loh Hua's Wealth in Surabaya	1929 to 1930	Panorama	Published as a serial
Roema Sekola jang Saja Impiken The Schoolhouse of My Dreams	1925	Sin Bin	
Satoe Resia di Maleman Sientjhia A Secret on the Eve of Chinese New Year	1937 to 1938	Moestika Panorama	Published as a serial
Sifatnja Sato Koentjoe The Personality of a Comptroller	1933	Moestika	
Soemangetnja Boenga Tjempaka The Joys of a Lily	1931 to 1932	Moestika Panorama	Published as a serial
Soerat-Soerat dari Paulina Letters from Paulina	1938 to 1942	Moestika Romans	
Zonder Lentera Without a Lantern	1930	Moestika Panorama	

== Magazines ==
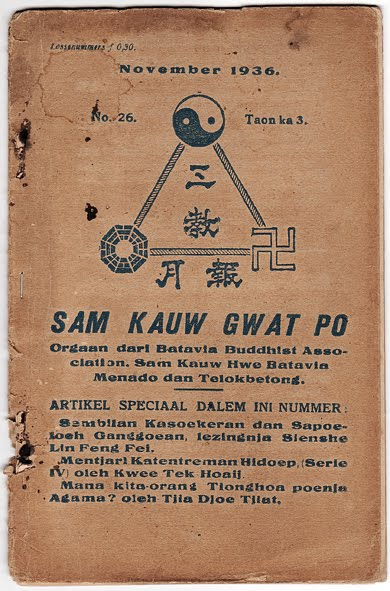
Sam Kauw Gwat Po

Magazines edited by Kwee Tek Hoay
Title	Year established	Year closed	Frequency
Moestika Dharma	1932	1936	Monthly
Moestika Panorama	1930	1932	Weekly
Moestika Romans	1932	1934	Weekly
Panorama	1925	1932	Weekly
Sam Kauw Gwat Po	1934	1941	Monthly

== Stage plays ==
The stage plays of Kwee Tek Hoay
Title	Year(s)	Publisher	Note(s)
Allah jang Palsoe The False God	1919	Tjiong Koen Bie	
Barang Perhiasan jang Paling Berharga The Most Valuable Jewellery	1937	Moestika	First published as a serial in Moestika Romans, May to October 1936
Bidji Lada Pepper Seeds	1936	Moestika	Based on the life of the Buddha
Bingkisan Taon Baroe The New Year's Gift	1935	Moestika	
Korbannja Kong-Ek Victim of Kong Ek	1926	Hap Sing Kong Sie	First published as a serial in Sin Bin, 1925
Katoeloengan oleh Roh Istrinja Helped by His Wife's Spirit	1933	Moestika Romans	Together with Hoo Tiang Hoei; published as a serial from April to November
Korbannja Yi Yong Toen Victims of Yi Yong Toen	1928	Panorama	Published as a serial, 21 January to 5 May
Mait Idoep Living Corpse	1931	Moestika Panorama	
The Ordeal from General Chiang Kai Shik	1929	Panorama	Published as a serial, 17 August to 23 November
Pentjoeri Thief	1936	Moestika	First published as a serial, August to December 1935
Plesiran Hari Minggoe Relaxation on a Sunday	1930	Hoa Siang In Kiok	First published as a serial in Panorama, 1927

== Translations ==
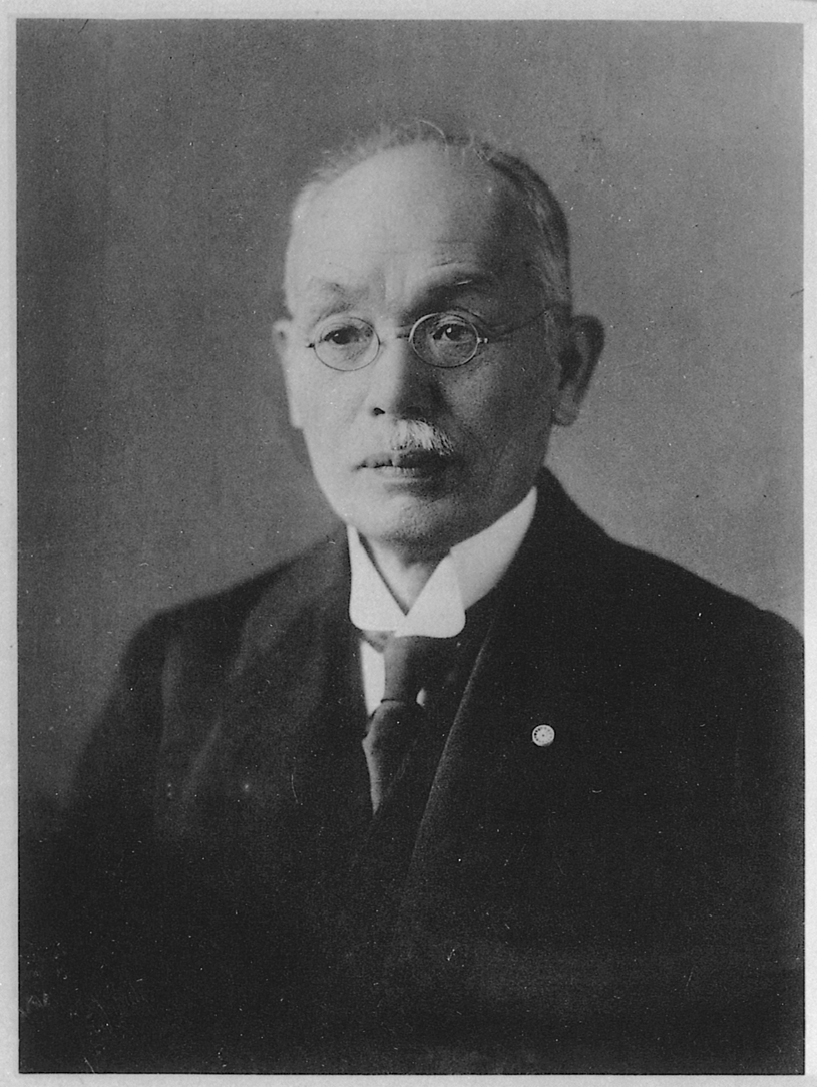
Kwee translated an article by Inoue Tetsujirō.

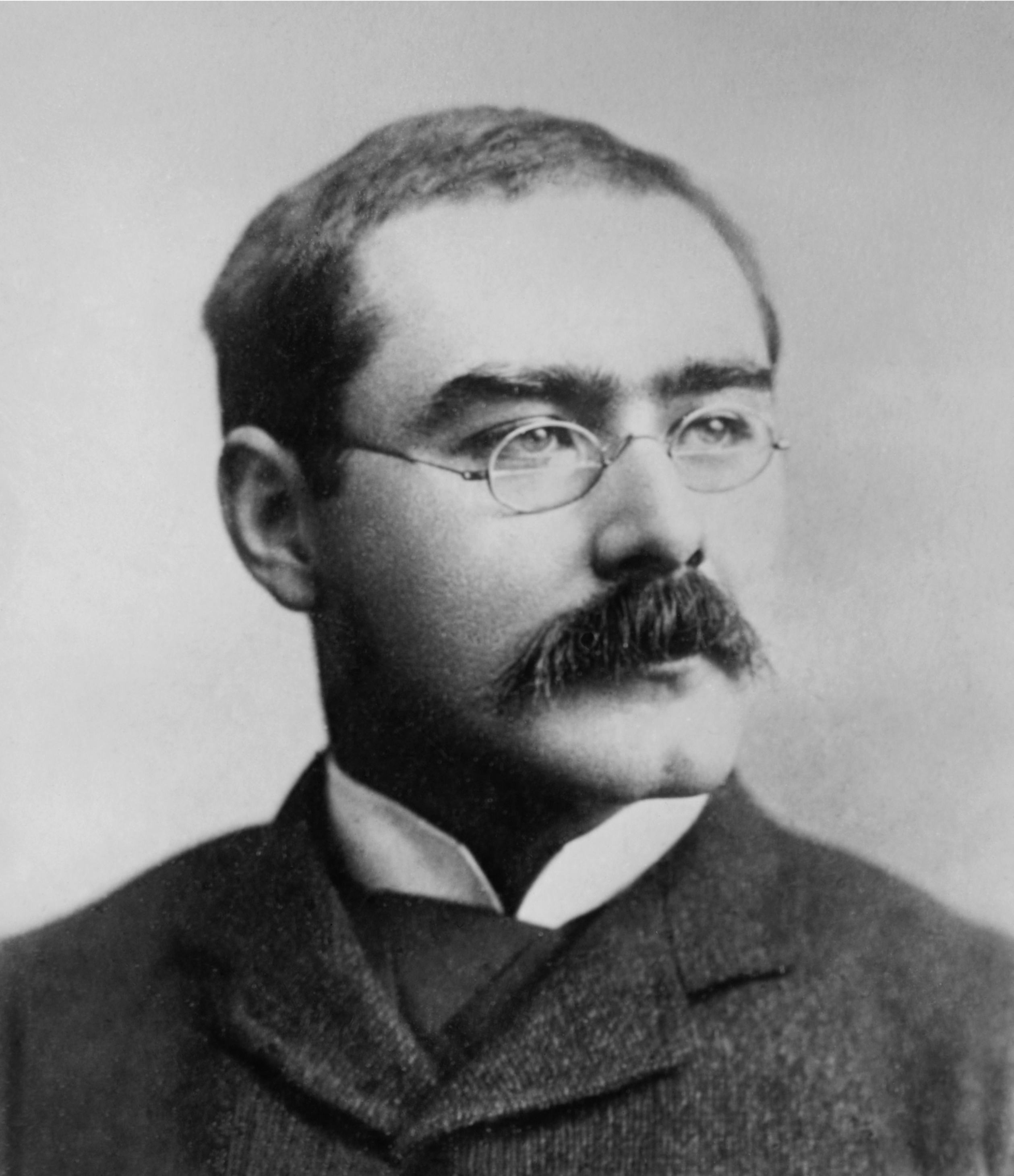
Kwee translated a short story by Rudyard Kipling.

The translations of Kwee Tek Hoay
Title	Year(s)	Publisher	Note(s)
Agama Buddha di Jawa pada Djeman Koeno Buddhism in Ancient Java	1934 to 1935	Moestika Dharma	Translated from the book Buddhism in Java by Arthur Fitz; published as a serial
Agama Islam dari Zaman Sekarang Islam in Modern Times	1938 to 1939	Moestika	Based on the book by George Thomas Bettany; published in two volumes
Bhagawad Gita Bhagavad Gita	1935	Moestika	Translated from the Bhagavad Gita and published in three volumes; includes original critical commentary
Cato	1930	Moestika Panorama	Translated from the stage play Cato, a Tragedy by Joseph Addison; published in two instalments
Keterangan Ringkas tentang Agama Buddha Disalin ka dalem Bahasa Melajoe Short Explanation of Buddhism Translated into Malay	1934	Moestika	Translated from the book Buddhism in a Nutshell by Narada Maha Thera
"Keterangan Ringkas tentang Agama Islam" "Short Explanation of Islam"	1936	Moestika	Translated from the article by W. G. Thatcher
"Khong Tjoe sebagi Manoesia dan Sebagi Goeroe" "Confucius as a Man and a Teacher"	1940	Moestika	Translated from the article "Confucius, the Man and the Teacher" by Inoue Tetsujirō
Kuan Yin atawa Kwan Im Kuan Yin or Kwan Im	1941	Moestika	Adapted from the book Myths and Legends of China by E. T. C. Werner; regarding Guanyin
"Lelakon Gontjangannja Rasa Hati" "Story of the Quivering Heart"	1935 to 1936	Moestika Romans	From a story by R. Gunnasekara; serialised
Nabi Poeti The White Prophet	1930 to 1932	Panorama	A free adaptation of The White Prophet by Hall Caine
Nan Hoa King – Salinan Nan Hoa King: A Transcription	1949 to 1950	Moestika	From the philosophy of Zhuangzi
Penghidoepan Bhagawan Saripoetra Life of the Most Excellent Sariputra	1936	Moestika	Translated from The Life of Most Excellent Shariputra by Narada Maha Thera
"Rebirth – Toemimbal Lahir"	1936	Moestika Romans	From a short story by R. Gunnasekara; serialised
"Tjerita jang Paling Indah dalem Doenia" "The Finest Story in the World"	1936 to 1937	Moestika Romans	Translated from "The Finest Story in the World" by Rudyard Kipling; serialised
"Tjerita tentang Reincarnatie: Melintasi itoe Tjadir" "A Tale of Reincarnation: Through the Veil"	1936	Moestika Romans	Translated from the story "Through the Veil" by Sir Arthur Conan Doyle; serialised

== Works cited ==
- A.S., Marcus; Benedanto, Pax, eds. (2007). Kesastraan Melayu Tionghoa dan Kebangsaan Indonesia [Chinese Malay Literature and the Indonesian Nation] (in Indonesian). Vol. 10. Jakarta: Kepustakaan Populer Gramedia. ISBN 978-979-91-0079-5.
- Biran, Misbach Yusa (2009). Sejarah Film 1900–1950: Bikin Film di Jawa [History of Film 1900–1950: Making Films in Java] (in Indonesian). Jakarta: Komunitas Bamboo working with the Jakarta Art Council. ISBN 978-979-3731-58-2.
- Fowler, George A.; Kwee, Tek Hoay (2013). The Rose of Cikembang. Jakarta: Lontar Foundation. ISBN 978-602-9144-24-6.
- Nio, Joe Lan (1962). Sastera Indonesia-Tionghoa [Indonesian-Chinese Literature] (in Indonesian). Jakarta: Gunung Agung. OCLC 3094508.
- Salmon, Claudine (1989). "Pandangan Kwee Tek Hoay Terhadap Pendidikan Anak-Anak Tionghoa di Indonesia" [Kwee Tek Hoay's View on the Education of Chinese Children in Indonesia]. In Sidharta, Myra (ed.). 100 Tahun Kwee Tek Hoay: Dari Penjaja Tekstil sampai ke Pendekar Pena [100 Years of Kwee Tek Hoay: From Textile Peddler to Pen-Wielding Warrior] (in Indonesian). Jakarta: Sinar Harapan. pp. 34–54. ISBN 978-979-416-040-4.
- Sidharta, Myra (1989). "Daftar Karya Tulis Kwee Tek Hoay" [Bibliography of Kwee Tek Hoay]. In Sidharta, Myra (ed.). 100 Tahun Kwee Tek Hoay: Dari Penjaja Tekstil sampai ke Pendekar Pena [100 Years of Kwee Tek Hoay: From Textile Peddler to Pen-Wielding Warrior] (in Indonesian). Jakarta: Sinar Harapan. pp. 306–25. ISBN 978-979-416-040-4.
- Sumardjo, Jakob (2004). Kesusastraan Melayu Rendah [Low Malay Literature] (in Indonesian). Yogyakarta: Galang Press. ISBN 978-979-3627-16-8.
- Suryadinata, Leo (1995). Prominent Indonesian Chinese: Biographical Sketches. Singapore: Institute of Southeast Asian Studies. ISBN 978-981-3055-04-9.
- Suryadinata, Leo (2010). Tokoh Tionghoa & Identitas Indonesia [Chinese Figures & Indonesian Identity] (in Indonesian). Jakarta: Komunitas Bambu. ISBN 978-979-3731-75-9.
