= Boenga Roos dari Tjikembang (novel) =

Malay-language novel by Kwee Tek Hoay

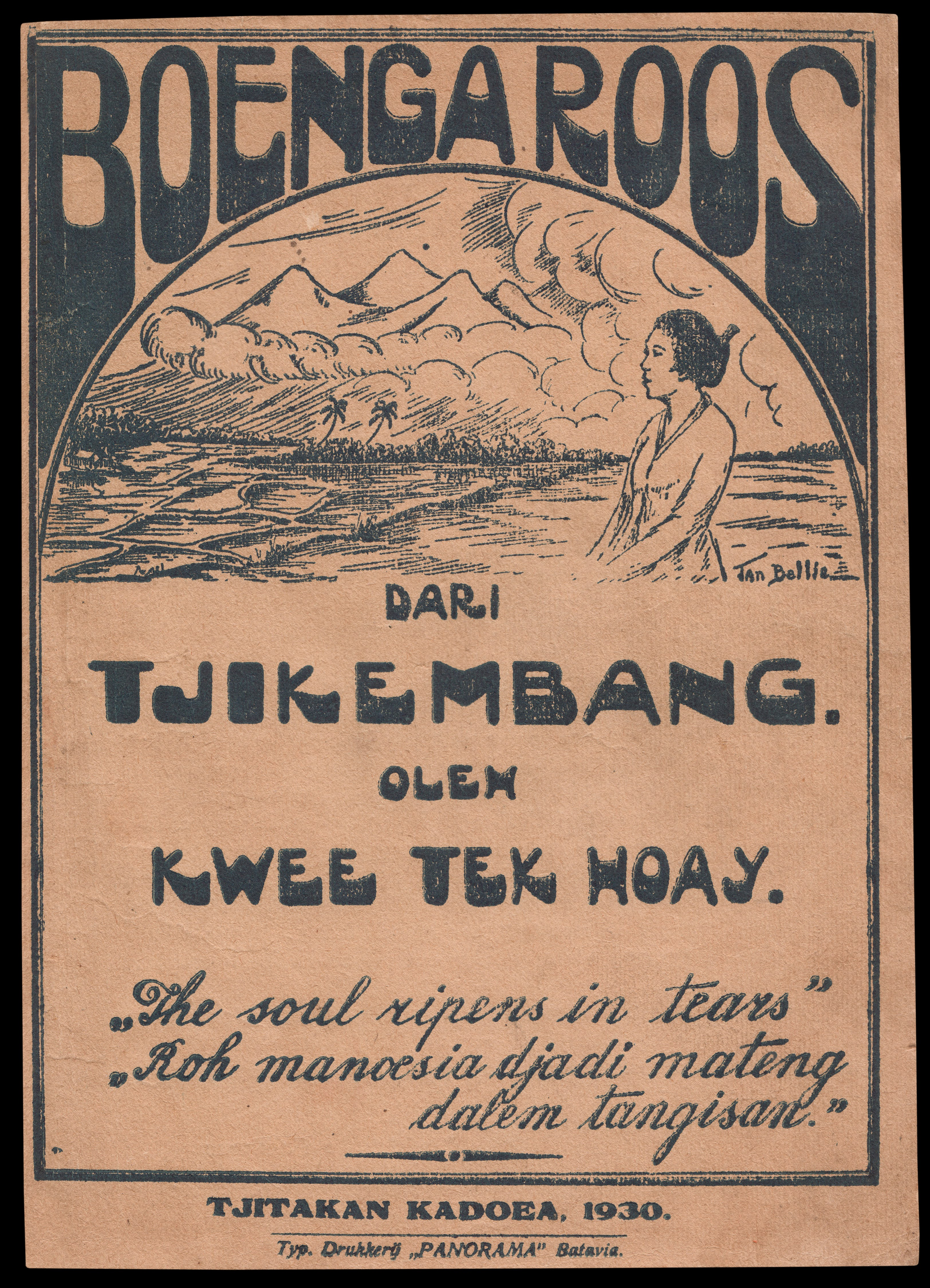
- Cover, second printing (1930)
- Author: Kwee Tek Hoay
- Cover artist: Tan Bellia
- Language: Vernacular Malay
- Genre: Romance novel
- Published: 1927 (Panorama); 2013 (Lontar Foundation, in English)
- Publication place: Dutch East Indies
- Pages: 156
- OCLC: 66055761

Boenga Roos dari Tjikembang (Note: Later printings have used the Perfected Spelling Bunga Roos dari Cikembang, with the text likewise amended. This article retains the original orthography for all personal names and quotations.) (Indonesian pronunciation: [ˌbuŋa ˌrʊs ˌdari tʃikəmˈbaŋ]; translated to English as The Rose of Cikembang) is a 1927 vernacular Malay-language novel written by Kwee Tek Hoay. The seventeen-chapter book follows a plantation manager, Aij Tjeng, who must leave his beloved njai (concubine) Marsiti so that he can be married. Eighteen years later, after Aij Tjeng's daughter Lily dies, her fiancé Bian Koen discovers that Marsiti had a daughter with Aij Tjeng, Roosminah, who greatly resembles Lily. In the end Bian Koen and Roosminah are married.

Inspired by the lyrics to the song "If Those Lips Could Only Speak" and William Shakespeare's A Midsummer Night's Dream, Boenga Roos dari Tjikembang was initially written as an outline for the stage drama troupe Union Dalia. Kwee intermixed several languages other than Malay, particularly Dutch, Sundanese, and English; he included two quotes from English poems and another from an English song. The novel has been interpreted variously as a promotion of theosophy, a treatise on the Buddhist concept of reincarnation, a call for education, an ode to njais, and a condemnation of how such women are treated.

The novel was initially published as a serial in Kwee's magazine Panorama; it proved to be his most popular work. By 1930 there had been a number of stage adaptations, not all of which were authorised, leading Kwee to ask readers to help him enforce his copyright. The work was filmed in 1931 by The Teng Chun and then in 1975 by Fred Young and Rempo Urip. Though not considered part of the Indonesian literary canon, the book ranks amongst the most reprinted works of Chinese Malay literature. It has been translated into Dutch and English.

== Plot ==
Oh Aij Tjeng is a young ethnic Chinese man who runs a plantation in West Java. He lives there with his njai (concubine), a Sundanese woman named Marsiti. The two are deeply in love and promise to be faithful forever. However, not long afterwards Aij Tjeng's father Oh Pin Loh comes to tell Aij Tjeng that he has been betrothed to Gwat Nio, the daughter of the plantation's owner Liok Keng Djim. Marsiti is sent away by the elder Oh and, after Aij Tjeng orders his manservant Tirta to find her, Tirta disappears as well. After the marriage, Aij Tjeng finds in Gwat Nio all of the same traits which made him fall in love with Marsiti, but even more polished owing to her better education. He falls in love with her and begins to forget Marsiti, and the couple have a daughter, Lily.

One day Keng Djim calls Aij Tjeng and Gwat Nio to his deathbed, where he confesses that he has recently learned that Marsiti was his daughter from a native njai he had taken as a youth, and that Marsiti had died. He greatly regrets that he and Pin Loh had her chased away from the plantation. Keng Djim hints that there is another secret to be shared, but dies before he can reveal it. Aij Tjeng calls for his father, to discover the secret, but finds that he too has died.

Eighteen years pass, and Lily is betrothed to a rich Chinese youth named Sim Bian Koen. Lily, although beautiful and talented, is obsessed with death and sadness; she believes that she is destined to die young. She eventually tells Bian Koen to find another fiancée as she will soon leave him. She falls ill shortly thereafter, and doctors are unable to save her. In the aftermath, Bian Koen considers suicide and Aij Tjeng and Gwat Nio become sick from their despair.

By the following year Aij Tjeng and Gwat Nio have mostly recovered, having moved far away and turned to religion. Bian Koen, however, remains suicidal, and intends to go to war in China to find death; the only thing restraining him is his promise to wait for the anniversary of Lily's death. One day, as he is passing through the village of Cikembang, he finds a well-kept grave. As he examines the area, he sees a woman who he thinks is Lily. She rejects his embrace and runs away. When Bian Koen chases her, he falls and passes out.

When he wakes up at his home, Bian Koen tells his parents that he saw Lily in Cikembang. After investigating, the Sims discover that "Lily" is in fact Aij Tjeng's daughter with Marsiti, Roosminah, who was raised in secret by Tirta. Because of her beauty, equal to that of Lily in every way, she is known as "The Rose of Cikembang". The Sims are able to contact Aij Tjeng, and after discovering Roosminah's background they have Roosminah take over Lily's identity. Her extravagant wedding with Bian Koen is attended by thousands, including Marsiti's spirit.

Five years later, Bian Koen and Roosminah live with their two children at the plantation Aij Tjeng used to manage. While Aij Tjeng and Gwat Nio are visiting, their granddaughter Elsy (guided by Marsiti's spirit) brings them flowers from a tree Marsiti had planted. The family take it as a sign of her love.

== Writing ==
Boenga Roos dari Tjikembang was written by journalist Kwee Tek Hoay. Born to an ethnic Chinese textile merchant and his wife, Kwee had been raised in Chinese culture and educated at schools that focused on preparing students for life in a modern world, as opposed to promoting tradition for its own sake. By the time he wrote the novel, Kwee was an active proponent of Buddhist teachings. He also wrote extensively on themes relating to native Indonesians and was a keen social observer. Kwee read extensively in Dutch, English, and Malay; he drew on these influences after becoming a writer. His first novel, Djadi Korbannja "Perempoean Hina" (The Victim of a "Contemptible Woman"), was published in 1924.

According to his original introduction, Kwee was inspired to write the novel after hearing his daughter singing Charles Ridgewell and Will Godwin's "If Those Lips Could Only Speak" (identified by Kwee as "Mimi d'Amour"). He was struck by the melancholic lyrics and decided to write a "sad story or stage play" (Note: Original: "... satoe tjerita atawa lelakon komedie jang sedih.") based on it. However, he did not begin the writing process until February 1927, when the Union Dalia Opera requested permission to perform his earlier work Allah jang Palsoe (A False God; 1919). As he considered the work too difficult for the native troupe, he began writing an original outline for their performance, based on his musings. Union Dalia performed Boenga Roos dari Tjikembang on 5 March 1927, using an outline Kwee had written; the novel was not completed until 20 April. During a conversation with fellow writer Khouw Sin Eng, Kwee said that part of the story had been based on William Shakespeare's A Midsummer Night's Dream, particularly the appearance of a dead person coming back to life.

Boenga Roos dari Tjikembang is divided into seventeen chapters and, in its first printing, was 157 pages in length. As such, it is considerably shorter than some of Kwee's other works. (Note: Drama dari Merapi (Drama from Merapi) was 620 pages long, while Drama di Boven Digoel (Drama from Boven Digoel), Kwee's longest, was 718 pages (Sutedja-Liem 2007, p. 273).) Translator George A. Fowler writes that, unlike works published by Balai Pustaka, the book did not receive a professional copyedit before publication; this was common for works of Chinese Malay literature, which "never had, nor indeed wanted, the corrective, prescriptive 'good literary taste' filter of European editors".

== Style ==
Boenga Roos dari Tjikembang was written in vernacular Malay, as common for works by contemporary Chinese writers in the Dutch East Indies. Indonesian literary critic Jakob Sumardjo writes that Kwee's use of the language, one common within contemporary society, was more "modern" than most of the more formal Balai Pustaka publications (perhaps excepting Abdoel Moeis' Salah Asuhan [Never the Twain], published the following year): it remained focused on key events, those required to advance the story as a whole. The book uses non-Malay words commonly: Sumardjo counts 87 Dutch words, 60 from Sundanese, and 14 English ones.

During dialogue, diction is dependent on the character's social background: Sumardjo writes that Marsiti speaks as a poor villager with little education would, and that Aij Tjeng's father and father-in-law use constructions and give advice only plausible if coming from older people. He finds only one character, the Columbia University-educated Bian Koen, to be unrealistic: Sumardjo criticises Bian Koen's emotionality, considering it unfitting of an individual with the character's education and life experiences. In other instances Kwee builds suspense by extended use of ellipses, a form which Sumardjo suggests was inspired by contemporary silat (traditional martial arts) stories.

As was conventional in contemporary novels such as Marah Roesli's Sitti Nurbaya (1922), Boenga Roos dari Tjikembang integrates poetic verse into its narrative. One example, an original work in Sundanese, is sung by Marsiti after confiding her dream to Aij Tjeng. Two others are quoted from English poems. The first is an untitled work by Irish poet Thomas Moore, beginning with the lines "Go, let me weep". The second is the epigraph from the novel Hyperion (1839) by American writer Henry Wadsworth Longfellow. A final piece of verse consists of the lyrics that inspired Kwee to write the novel. (Note: The original printing had only the Malay translation of these lyrics, while the second edition included the English lyrics as well.) Malay-language translations are provided for all English and Sundanese quotations. An example is one of three quatrains sung by Marsiti:

Sundanese

Soesoekan djalan tjileungtjang,
Dipengkong make kamalir;
Isoekan koering rek leumpang,
Pageto ngan bati watir

Malay

Kali ketjil jalan air hoedjan mengalir,
Dibatasi dengan galangan,
Besok akoe akan pergi
Loesa tinggal khawatir

English

A stream with rain water swelling,
Make a cut and turn its flow;
Tomorrow I am leaving,
Then only worries I will know

== Themes ==
In his foreword, Kwee wrote that Boenga Roos dari Tjikembang was intended to lead readers to consider how fate is often at odds with the wants of those involved. Critical readings have, however, been diverse. The sinologist Myra Sidharta notes that the book is replete with mysticism common at the time, as does another sinologist, John Kwee. The latter cites four examples: a dream of Marsiti's, later shown to be prophetic, in which she is forcibly separated from Aij Tjeng despite his previous promise that they would never part; a discussion of reuniting with loved ones after death; Marsiti's spirit attending her daughter's wedding; and a scene towards the end of the novel in which Marsiti's spirit guides Roosminah's daughter to pick flowers for Aij Tjeng and Gwat Nio. Nio Joe Lan, in his history of Chinese Malay literature, notes that Kwee was the only Chinese writer of romances to also write on Eastern (particularly Chinese) philosophy. He finds mysticism to be a common theme in Kwee's works, noting it as particularly well-developed in the later novel Soemangetnja Boenga Tjempaka (The Joy of the Cempaka Flowers).

Eric Oey of the University of California, Berkeley, writes that the novel's mysticism builds into a promotion of theosophy and Buddhist ideals: Aij Tjeng and Gwat Nio read about both, then leave their materialistic lives to become more spiritual. Ultimately, he writes, the concept of reincarnation is put forth when Roosminah is discovered soon after Lily's death. Faruk of Gadjah Mada University also notes the novel's concept of reincarnation, drawing on its repeated emphasis on the parallels (both physical and psychological) between the half-sisters Marsiti and Gwat Nio, as well as Lily and Roosminah.

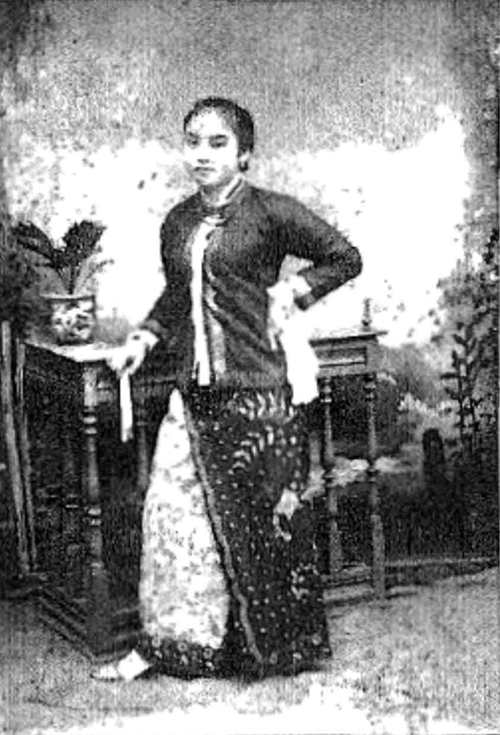
Studies have emphasised the role of njais in Boenga Roos dari Tjikembang.

Sidharta, considering the same interrelations between Marsiti/Gwat Nio, does not suggest reincarnation, instead writing that the novel showed that there is no difference in the love of a njai and a lawfully wedded wife. Translator Maya Sutedja-Liem, in a similar vein, notes a "modern" message against mistreatment of njais. However, she concludes that the emphasis on the mystical powers which Marsiti seems to possess causes an abandonment of realism, thus rendering the book "anti-modern".

Much commentary has focused on the novel's depiction of njais, a subject common in contemporary Chinese Malay literature. (Note: Salmon (1985, pp. 98–99) writes that Boenga Roos dari Tjikembang remains the most popular of such contemporary works, which included such titles as Oelar jang Tjantik (The Beautiful Snake; 1929) by Soe Lie Piet and Boenga Roos Merah (The Red Rose; 1939) by Chang Mung Tze.) Sumardjo describes the novel as an ode to njais, citing Marsiti's loyalty to Aij Tjeng and her pureness of purpose; Marsiti is ultimately recognised for her devotion when her grave in Cikembang is moved to Batavia, with empty spaces on either side for Aij Tjeng and Gwat Nio. Sumardjo finds subtle criticism of the Dutch and Chinese men who kept njais, showing the women as often becoming victims of their lovers. He suggests that this was manifested in the character of Keng Djim's unnamed njai (Marsiti's mother), who is banished after rumours spread that she has been unfaithful. Sutedja-Liem likewise emphasises the role of the njai within the story, considering the novel to be an ode to the love and loyalty of the concubines.

Sidharta suggests that the novel was written as an argument that the illegitimate children of njais would be able to develop as any other person, given the proper education. Sutedja-Liem likewise finds that the need for education (including an understanding of music) is a subtext found in the novel. However, unlike Sidharta she considers this message directed not only at the children of njais, but women in general. Only through receiving an education and following Chinese and European etiquette, she writes, could a woman be considered truly "modern".

== Publication history ==
Boenga Roos dari Tjikembang was originally published in 1927 as a serial in Kwee's magazine Panorama, running from March to September. The story was compiled as a book later that year and published by Hoa Siang In Kiok. This print run of 1,000 copies, with the slogan "Roh manoesia djadi mateng dalem tangis / The soul ripens in tears" on its cover, sold out. However, in the foreword to the second edition Kwee suggested that "writing Malay novels ... was not enough to live on". (Note: Original: "... pakerdjaan mengarang tjerita Melajoe ... tida membri hatsil jang bole dipake idoep.")

The book has since proved to be one of Kwee's most popular novels, and is one of the most commonly reprinted works of Chinese Malay literature. Its second printing was in 1930, by Kwee's publishing house Panorama, with a third printing by Swastika in 1963; at the time it was the only work of Chinese Malay literature to have been republished after the Indonesian National Revolution (1945–49). Sidharta records a fourth printing in 1972, although she does not note a publisher. A new printing, adapting the 1972 spelling reform, was included in the second volume of Kesastraan Melayu Tionghoa dan Kebangsaan Indonesia, an anthology of Chinese Malay literature.

Several translations have been made. In 2007 Boenga Roos dari Tjikembang was translated to Dutch as De roos uit Tjikembang by Sutedja-Liem; this edition was published by KITLV Press as part of the anthology De Njai: Moeder van Alle Volken: 'De Roos uit Tjikembang' en Andere Verhalen (The Njai: Mother of All Peoples: 'De Roos uit Tjikembang' and Other Stories). In 2013 the Lontar Foundation published an English-language translation by Fowler under the title The Rose of Cikembang. This included an introduction to the subject and social conditions, penned by Fowler.

== Performances and adaptations ==
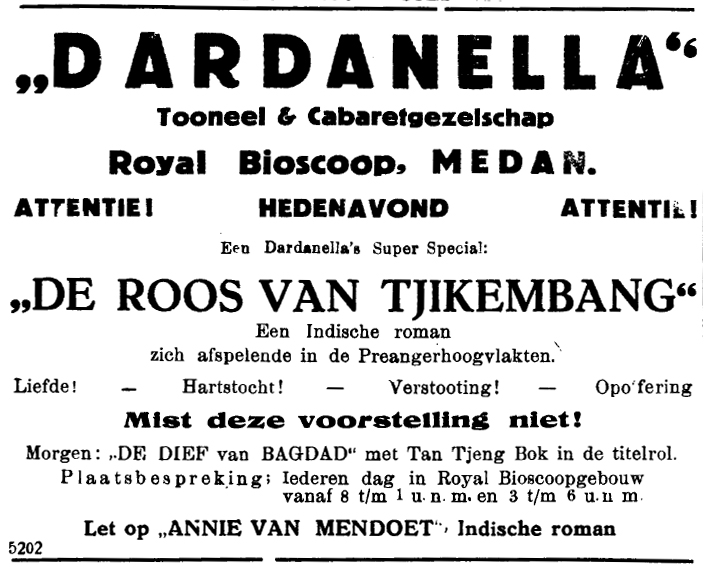
An advertisement for a performance of Boenga Roos dari Tjikembang in Medan by Dardanella, 1930

Stage performances and adaptations of Boenga Roos dari Tjikembang began before the novel was completed, beginning with the Union Dalia performance in 1927. By 1930 numerous native and ethnic-Chinese troupes had performed the story; some received direct help from Kwee. Though these stage performances were sometimes credited for the novel's success, Kwee discounted the idea, writing that the two mediums were different and, in adaptations, changes were necessary. He noted the tendency of native troupes to emphasise Marsiti's role as one such change and considered most such adaptations – excepting those performed by Dardanella – to be of poor quality. He also found wrote that native troupes generally did not pay him for the right to use the story, and in the 1930 edition Kwee asked readers to help him enforce his copyright by informing Panorama of any illegal performances. Stage performances have continued into the 2000s.

The novel has twice been adapted for film. The first adaptation, released in 1931, was directed by The Teng Chun. The sinologist Leo Suryadinata lists it as the first domestically produced sound film in the Dutch East Indies, although the film historian Misbach Yusa Biran suggests that there was already a domestic talkie released in 1930. In 1975 an adaptation was made by Fred Young and Rempo Urip under the title Bunga Roos dari Cikembang. (Note: This title followed the Perfected Spelling System.) Although the main points of the story remained the same, several of the Chinese names were Indonesianised. Oh Aij Cheng, for example, was renamed Wiranta, while Gwat Nio's name was changed to Salmah.

== Reception ==
Modern reviews of the novel have been positive. Nio describes the book as a "beautiful tragic romance" (Note: Original: "... tjerita tragis jang indah") that "enchants the heart." (Note: Original: "... menawan hati.") The Indonesian scholar of Indonesian literature Jakob Sumardjo writes that, though in most of his works Kwee appeared to be strongly impressing his point of view on the reader to the point of "tearing the novels' structural balance", (Note: Original: "... merobek keseimbangan struktural novel.") this flaw was not present in Boenga Roos dari Tjikembang; instead, Sumardjo finds it "truly good in its form and technique, though the ideals contained within may not be that significant". (Note: Original: "... benar-benar bagus dalam bentuk dan tekniknya, meskipun dari segi gagasan mungkin tidak begitu besar artinya.")

Fowler writes that the love between Aij Tjeng and Marsiti is handled with "unusual delicacy and tenderness" despite the social ostracism faced by njais. In a review of the English edition for The Jakarta Post, Linawati Sidarto describes it as "the ultimate weekend read", "tugging at emotions with the intrigues of love, lies and sacrifice" while at the same time providing an interesting insight into the now-forgotten society in which it takes place. She describes Fowler's introduction as "worth reading by itself".

As with all works written in vernacular Malay, the novel has not been considered part of the Indonesian literary canon. In his doctoral thesis, J. Francisco B. Benitez posits a socio-political cause for this. The Dutch colonial government used Court Malay as a "language of administration", a language for everyday dealings, while the Indonesian nationalists appropriated the language to help build a national culture. Chinese Malay literature, written in "low" Malay, was steadily marginalised. Sumardjo, however, sees a question of classification: though vernacular Malay was the lingua franca of the time, it was not Indonesian, and as such, he asks whether works in vernacular Malay should be classified as local literature, Indonesian literature, or simply Chinese Malay literature.

== Works cited ==
- Benitez, J. Francisco B. (2004). Awit and Syair: Alternative Subjectivities and Multiple Modernities in Nineteenth Century Insular Southeast Asia (PhD thesis). Madison: University of Wisconsin. (subscription required)
- Biran, Misbach Yusa (2009). Sejarah Film 1900–1950: Bikin Film di Jawa [History of Film 1900–1950: Making Films in Java] (in Indonesian). Jakarta: Komunitas Bamboo working with the Jakarta Art Council. ISBN 978-979-3731-58-2.
- "Boenga Roos dari Tjikembang". filmindonesia.or.id (in Indonesian). Jakarta: Konfiden Foundation. Archived from the original on 2 December 2013.
- "Bunga Roos dari Tjikembang". filmindonesia.or.id (in Indonesian). Jakarta: Konfiden Foundation. Archived from the original on 2 December 2013.
- "Chinese-Indonesian writers told tales of life around them". The Jakarta Post. 26 May 2000. Archived from the original on 7 January 2014.
- Faruk (2007). Belenggu Pasca-Kolonialisme [Shackles of Post-Colonialism] (in Indonesian). Yogyakarta: Pustaka Pelajar. ISBN 978-979-1277-36-5.
- Fowler, George A. (2013a). "Introduction". The Rose of Cikembang. Jakarta: Lontar Foundation. pp. vii–xxviii. ISBN 978-602-9144-24-6.
- Fowler, George A. (2013b). "Translator's Note". The Rose of Cikembang. Jakarta: Lontar Foundation. pp. xxix–xxx. ISBN 978-602-9144-24-6.
- Kwee, John (1989). "Kwee Tek Hoay, Sang Dramawan" [Kwee Tek Hoay, the Dramatist]. In Sidharta, Myra (ed.). 100 Tahun Kwee Tek Hoay: Dari Penjaja Tekstil sampai ke Pendekar Pena [100 Years of Kwee Tek Hoay: From Textile Peddler to Pen-Wielding Warrior] (in Indonesian). Jakarta: Sinar Harapan. pp. 166–179. ISBN 978-979-416-040-4.
- Kwee, Tek Hoay (1930a). "Permoelaän Kata (Boeat Tjitakan Kadua)" [Foreword (For the Second Printing)]. Boenga Roos dari Tjikembang [The Rose of Tjikembang] (in Malay). Batavia: Panorama. pp. I–IV. OCLC 28683465.
- Kwee, Tek Hoay (1930b). Boenga Roos dari Tjikembang [The Rose of Tjikembang] (in Malay). Batavia: Panorama. pp. 1–108. OCLC 28683465.
- Kwee, Tek Hoay (2001a). "Permulaan Kata" [Foreword]. In A.S., Marcus; Benedanto, Pax (eds.). Kesastraan Melayu Tionghoa dan Kebangsaan Indonesia [Chinese Malay Literature and the Indonesian Nation] (in Indonesian). Vol. 2. Jakarta: Kepustakaan Populer Gramedia. pp. 297–300. ISBN 978-979-9023-45-2.
- Kwee, Tek Hoay (2001b). "Bunga Roos dari Cikembang" [The Rose of Cikembang]. In A.S., Marcus; Benedanto, Pax (eds.). Kesastraan Melayu Tionghoa dan Kebangsaan Indonesia [Chinese Malay Literature and the Indonesian Nation] (in Indonesian). Vol. 2. Jakarta: Kepustakaan Populer Gramedia. pp. 301–425. ISBN 978-979-9023-45-2.
- Kwee, Tek Hoay (2013). The Rose of Cikembang. Translated by Fowler, George A. Jakarta: Lontar Foundation.
- "Kwee Tek Hoay". Encyclopedia of Jakarta (in Indonesian). Jakarta City Government. Archived from the original on 28 August 2012.
- Nio, Joe Lan (1962). Sastera Indonesia-Tionghoa [Indonesian-Chinese Literature] (in Indonesian). Jakarta: Gunung Agung. OCLC 3094508.
- Oey, Eric (1989). "Santapan Rohani Tulisan-tulisan Keagamaan Kwee Tek Hoay" [Spiritual Servings in Kwee Tek Hoay's Religious Writings]. In Sidharta, Myra (ed.). 100 Tahun Kwee Tek Hoay: Dari Penjaja Tekstil sampai ke Pendekar Pena [100 Years of Kwee Tek Hoay: From Textile Peddler to Pen-Wielding Warrior] (in Indonesian). Jakarta: Sinar Harapan. pp. 220–253. ISBN 978-979-416-040-4.
- Ramsay, Deanna (31 January 2012). "Remembering an overlooked auteur". The Jakarta Post. Archived from the original on 24 February 2016.
- Salmon, Claudine (1985). Sastra Cina Peranakan dalam Bahasa Melayu [Peranakan Chinese Literature in the Malay Language] (in Indonesian). Jakarta: Balai Pustaka. OCLC 39909566.
- Sidarto, Linawati (25 August 2014). "'The Rose of Cikembang': The Holy Concubine". The Jakarta Post. Jakarta. p. 22. Archived from the original on 31 August 2014.
- Sidharta, Myra (1989a). "Bunga-Bunga di Taman Mustika: Pandangan Kwee Tek Hoay Terhadap Wanita dan Soal-soal Kewanitaan" [Flowers in the Bejeweled Garden: Kwee Tek Hoay's Views on Women and Related Issues]. In Sidharta, Myra (ed.). 100 Tahun Kwee Tek Hoay: Dari Penjaja Tekstil sampai ke Pendekar Pena [100 Years of Kwee Tek Hoay: From Textile Peddler to Pen-Wielding Warrior] (in Indonesian). Jakarta: Sinar Harapan. pp. 55–82. ISBN 978-979-416-040-4.
- Sidharta, Myra (1989b). "Daftar Karya Tulis Kwee Tek Hoay" [Bibliography of Kwee Tek Hoay]. In Sidharta, Myra (ed.). 100 Tahun Kwee Tek Hoay: Dari Penjaja Tekstil sampai ke Pendekar Pena [100 Years of Kwee Tek Hoay: From Textile Peddler to Pen-Wielding Warrior] (in Indonesian). Jakarta: Sinar Harapan. pp. 306–325. ISBN 978-979-416-040-4.
- Sidharta, Myra (1996). "Kwee Tek Hoay, Pengarang Serbabisa" [Kwee Tek Hoay, All-round Author]. In Suryadinata, Leo (ed.). Sastra Peranakan Tionghoa Indonesia [Indonesian Peranakan Chinese Literature] (in Indonesian). Jakarta: Grasindo. pp. 323–348. ISBN 978-979-553-855-4.
- Sidharta, Myra (2001). "Pengantar" [Foreword]. In A.S., Marcus; Benedanto, Pax (eds.). Kesastraan Melayu Tionghoa dan Kebangsaan Indonesia [Chinese Malay Literature and the Indonesian Nation] (in Indonesian). Vol. 2. Jakarta: Kepustakaan Populer Gramedia. pp. xv–xxiii. ISBN 978-979-9023-45-2.
- Sumardjo, Jakob (1989). "Kwee Tek Hoay Sebagai Sastrawan" [Kwee Tek Hoay as a Man of Letters]. In Sidharta, Myra (ed.). 100 Tahun Kwee Tek Hoay: Dari Penjaja Tekstil sampai ke Pendekar Pena [100 Years of Kwee Tek Hoay: From Textile Peddler to Pen-Wielding Warrior] (in Indonesian). Jakarta: Sinar Harapan. pp. 89–121. ISBN 978-979-416-040-4.
- Suryadinata, Leo (1995). Prominent Indonesian Chinese: Biographical Sketches. Singapore: Institute of Southeast Asian Studies. ISBN 978-981-3055-03-2.
- Sutedja-Liem, Maya (2007). "De Roos uit Tjikembang". De Njai: Moeder van Alle Volken: 'De Roos uit Tjikembang' en Andere Verhalen [The Njai: Mother of All Peoples: 'De Roos uit Tjikembang' and Other Stories] (in Dutch). Leiden: KITLV. pp. 269–342. ISBN 978-90-6718-301-7.
