= Siem Piet Nio =

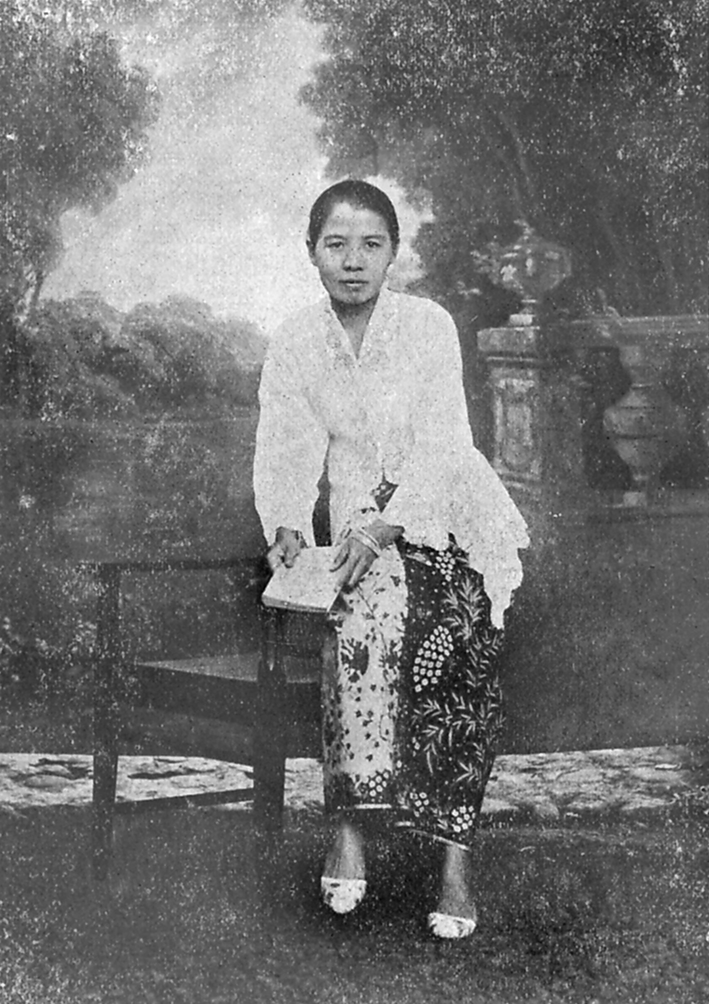
Siem Piet Nio, Indonesian Chinese feminist writer, around 1930

Siem Piet Nio (Chinese: 沈泌娘, b. 1907, d. 1986), who wrote under the pen name Hong Le Hoa, was an Indonesian language writer, magazine editor, journalist and women's rights advocate from the Dutch East Indies who was active during the 1920s and 1930s.

== Biography ==
Siem Piet Nio was born to a Peranakan Chinese family in Purbalingga, Central Java, Dutch East Indies in 1907. She was educated at a missionary school Bethel School (Indonesian: Sekolah Betel) in Purbalingga. After graduating at age fifteen, she founded an organization, the Commoner women's association (Chinese: 平民女子会).

In the late 1920s she relocated to Banyumas Regency in Central Java and started publishing pieces in the magazines Liberty (edited by Ong Ping Lok and published in Jember) and Panorama (edited by Kwee Tek Hoay and published in Batavia). She had first submitted a piece to Panorama in 1927, and Kwee was impressed by her writing; in addition to regularly publishing her work, he hired her as an assistant editor as well. Her pieces often related to the need for women to use their writing skills to elevate other women, and the need for female self-emancipation.

In August 1928 she became editor-in-chief of the Indonesian-language magazine Soeara Persatoean Kaoem Prempoean Tionghoa Indonesia (Voice of the federation of Indonesian Chinese women) which was published in Sukabumi. The magazine was the mouthpiece of that Federation, which had seven member organizations run by Peranakan women from various places in Java and had been created partly as a result of her own advocacy. The members of the Federation mainly interacted through the mail, and were also known at times as the Persatoean Journaliste Prampoean (Women Journalists Federation). Because the magazine was distributed for free and had no outside funding, it was short, with issues often being under two pages long. Nonetheless, it may have been the first Malay language Chinese feminist magazine in the Indies. According to a review from the time, the magazine described the business of the federation, had a section about education and family life, and a literary section.

In 1930 she married the merchant Liauw Seng Toh and they continued to live in Sukabumi. After that she wrote for the magazine Menara, but because of the responsibilities of raising children she reduced her writing activity. World War II and the Japanese occupation of the Dutch East Indies was difficult for her, as for most Chinese Indonesians; she even lost her collection of her former publications during that time. At some point she retired completely from writing and operated a shop in Sukabumi for the rest of her life. She died in Sukabumi in 1986.
