= Kwee Tek Hoay =

Indonesian writer and journalist

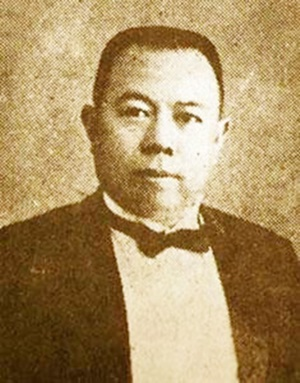
- Born: 31 July 1886; Bogor, West Java
- Died: 4 July 1951 (aged 64); Cicurug, Sukabumi, West Java
- Occupation: Writer
- Spouse: Oeij Hiang Nio
- Children: 3
- Writing career
- Language: Indonesian
- Genres: Novels, Drama
- Subject: Literature
- Notable works: Drama of Krakatoa, Dramatist Digoel

Kwee Tek Hoay (Chinese: 郭德懷; Pe̍h-ōe-jī: Koeh Tek-hoâi; pinyin: Guō Déhuái; 31 July 1886 – 4 July 1951) was an Indonesian Malay-language writer of novels and drama, and a journalist.

== Biography ==
Kwee Tek Hoay, the youngest son of Tjiam Kwee Hong and Tan Ay Nio, often played truant during his early school years because he could not understand the language of instruction, Hokkien. He started learning the textile business from his father, and during this period began taking interest in reading books. Kwee began his writing career as a journalist. He served on the editorial board for magazines and newspapers, such as Ho Po Li Po (Bogor), and Sin Po (Batavia, Jakarta). He tutored his eldest daughter Njonja Tjoa Hin Hoei (born Kwee Yat Nio) into a career in journalism as well. In 1926, Kwee ventured into publishing his own magazine, called Panorama, a progressive and modern Indonesian language publication which gave space for new ideas and young women writers such as Siem Piet Nio. However, Kwee had a hard time sustaining the magazine financially and in 1931 sold it to the jurist, politician and newspaper proprietor Phoa Liong Gie. His most famous paper on the history and background of the founding association Tiong Hoa Hwee Koan, The Origins of the Modern Chinese Movement in Indonesia, came out in series from August 1936 to January 1939.

Kwee was also as a novelist and playwright. His first story in drama form that received acclaim was Allah jang Palsoe (Counterfeit God). Published in 1919, it condemns individuals driven by money. Another of his works, Boenga Roos dari Tjikembang (The Rose of Tjikembang), was inspired by William Shakespeare's A Midsummer Night's Dream. Kwee adapted the story to reflect Indonesian circumstances, but also used the book to open discussion on the issue of the nyai, a concubine often kept by young unmarried men. The novel has been adapted for a play and twice for a screenplay, in 1931 and 1975. A recent staging of the play drew many people to see it for the sake of nostalgia.

His drama The Victim Yi Yong Toan was staged in 1928. It was a criticism of the removal of young men to China to fight the Japanese army. Most of his works were inspired by real-life incidents and political issues. The drama Digoel was based on the life of a Communist Party leader and his daughter. Another of his works, titled Drama in Boven Digul, was based on the events of the PKI rebellion against the Dutch government and the exile of communists to the Boven-Digoel concentration camp.

During the 1920s, Kwee became actively engaged in the Tri Dharma. He ensured that the Buddhist temple in Jakarta also served as an institution for lessons on Buddhism. He is credited with the publication of the first Indonesian-language magazine on the teachings of Buddhism, Dharma Moestika (1932–1934).

== Legacy ==
In 2011, his work Drama in Boven Digul was selected as Kwee's magnum opus by the Gerakan Indonesia Membaca Sastra (GIMS) or the Indonesia Reads Literature Movement as their first work of Indonesian literature to be read.

Another of Kwee's works, Nonton Cap Go Meh, was honoured by President Susilo Bambang Yudhoyono, in November 2011, along with eight others with the Bintang Budaya Parama Dharma award for contributing to the cultural heritage of the country. Set in the 1930s, the drama is a reflection of Kwee's progressive philosophy. It revolves around the life of a married couple, Thomas and Lies, who wanted to watch 'Cap Go Meh', a celebration of the 15th day after the New Year. However, they were not allowed to go out together, because of the restrictive old-school social rule that allowed them only the company of the members of the same gender. The couple not only expressed their dislike for such restrictive thinking, but also set an example for the youth to adopt more modern thinking.

Recognizing the contributions of Kwee and other major writers to Indonesian literature, Gramedia released a series of ten volumes, titled "Kesastraan Melayu Tionghoa dan Kebangsaan Indonesia" (Chinese-Malay Literature and Indonesian Nationhood). Many of Kwee's writings that document the life and culture of the 19th and 20th century Indonesia are included in the publication. Kwee's works have been performed by many theatres, such as Theatre Bejana that started with Bunga Roos dari Cikembang in February 2004, an adaptation of Kwee's Pencuri (The Thief) in 2010, Zonder Lentera (Without Light) in 2011 and Nonton Cap Go Meh in 2012.

== Selected publications ==
- Tek Hoay, Kwee (1925). Roema sekola jang saja impiken (in Indonesian). Bandoeng: Sin Bin. OCLC 41908142.
- Tek Hoay, Kwee (1926). Korbannja Kong-Ek : toneelstuk dalem 4 bagian (in Indonesian). Semarang: Hap Sing Kongsie. OCLC 63888885.
- Tek Hoay, Kwee (1929). Drama dari Krakatau (in Indonesian). Batavia: Hoa Siang in Kiok. OCLC 64687346.
- Tek Hoay, Kwee (1930). Nonton Tjapgome (in Indonesian). Batavia: Panorama. OCLC 64683821.
- Tek Hoay, Kwee (1931). Bouquet panorama : koempoelan sair-sair Melajoe (in Indonesian). Batavia: Panorama. OCLC 64683817.
- Tek Hoay, Kwee (1933). Sifatnja satoe koentjoe : satoe hikajat dari djeman Tjhing Tiauw (in Indonesian). Tjitjoeroeg: Moestika. OCLC 63888661.
- Tek Hoay, Kwee (1936). Pentjoeri : toneelstuk dalem satoe bagian : satoe lelakon loetjoe dalem penghidoepan golongan Tionghoa hartawan di Djawa Koelon (in Indonesian). Batavia: Moestika. OCLC 63888878.
- Tek Hoay, Kwee (1937). Tiga tjerita tentang toemimbal lahir (reincarnatie) (in Indonesian). Tjitjoeroeg: Moestika. OCLC 63571245.
- Tek Hoay, Kwee (1941). Pemandangan Sam Kauw atas sifatnja klenteng-klenteng Tionghoa, maksoed dan toedjoean dari pamoedja'an, kabaekan dan kafaedahan jang didapet oleh si pemoedja, dengen dibanding sama laen-laen kapertjajaan dari berbagi-bagi bangsa (in Indonesian). Tjitjoeroeg: Moestika. OCLC 41916404.
- Tek Hoay, Kwee (1942). Apa adanja Sam Kauw : itoe tiga peladjaran agama jang dianoet oleh pendoedoek di Tiongkok riboean taon lamanja berikoet katerangan tentang pakoempoelan Sam Kauw Hwe poenja toedjoean dan tjara bekerdja menoeroet apa jang berlakoe di Batavia dari taon 1934 sampe 1941 (in Indonesian). Tjitjoeroeg: Moestika. OCLC 41916363.
- Tek Hoay, Kwee (1942). Berbagi-bagi katerangan tentang sembahjangan Tionghoa dan toedjoeannja : mengoendjoek atsal-oetsoel, sebab-sebab, maksoed dan toedjoean, serta kafaedahan dan kabaekan jang orang bisa dapet dari oepatjara dan kabiasa'an sembahjang boeat malakoeken pemoedja'an agama atawa poen perhoeboengan sociaal (in Indonesian). Tjitjoeroeg: Moestika. OCLC 41916439.
- Tek Hoay, Kwee (1960). Asapnja Hio dan kaju garu : satu romans dimalaman Sintjhia (in Indonesian). Surakarta: Swastika. OCLC 63888964.
- Tek Hoay, Kwee (1961). Meditasi dan sembahjang (in Indonesian). Surakarta: Swastika. OCLC 9601288.
- Tek Hoay, Kwee (1962). Yoga dalam tindak pemulaan, oleh Sri Krishna Prem (in Indonesian). Surakarta: Swastika. OCLC 4161069.
- Tek Hoay, Kwee (1962). Hauw dari Khong Tju; kebaktian anak kepada ibu bapa (in Indonesian). Surakarta: Swastika. OCLC 4278737.
- Tek Hoay, Kwee (1963). Bunga roos dari Tjikembang = The soul ripens in ters [i.e. tears] (in Indonesian). Surakarta: Swastika. OCLC 32297579.
- Tek Hoay, Kwee (1969). The origins of the modern Chinese movement in Indonesia (in Indonesian). Ithaca, N.Y.: Modern Indonesia Project, Southeast Asia Program, Cornell University. OCLC 114264.
- Tek Hoay, Kwee (1976). Kwan Im Po Sat (Avalokitesvara) (in Indonesian). Tangerang: Vihara Padamuttara. OCLC 63888938.
