= Boenga Roos dari Tjikembang (film) =

1931 film

- Directed by: The Teng Chun
- Written by: Kwee Tek Hoay
- Produced by: The Teng Chun
- Cinematography: The Teng Chun
- Production company: Cino Motion Pictures
- Release date: 1931 (Dutch East Indies)
- Country: Dutch East Indies

Boenga Roos dari Tjikembang (literally Rose from Cikembang) is a 1931 film from the Dutch East Indies directed, produced, and filmed by The Teng Chun. Based on a 1927 novel of the same name, it follows the complicated romantic situations of two generations of ethnic Chinese in the Indies. An early example of domestic sound films, the film was remade in 1975.

== Plot ==
The plantation worker Oh Ay Ceng must leave his beloved, Marsiti, after his father arranges for him to marry his boss' daughter Gwat Nio. Accepting this in melancholy, Marsiti tells Oh to follow his father's wishes and leaves; she later leaves the plantation and dies. Gwat's father reveals that Marsiti had been his daughter with a native mistress and hints at another secret, one which he is unable to tell before he too dies.

Together, Oh and Gwat have a child named Lily. When she is older, Lily is betrothed to Sim Bian Koen, the child of a rich plantation owner. When Lily dies, Sim threatens to go to Guangdong and join the army there. Before his departure he goes back to his father's plantation. On the way, he is shocked when he meets Roosminah, Oh's illegitimate child with Marsiti who greatly resembles her half-sister, at a graveyard. Eventually Sim and Roosminah are married.

== Background ==
Boenga Roos dari Tjikembang was produced, directed, and filmed by The Teng Chun, a peranakan Chinese film importer who had studied in Hollywood in the early 1920s before going to Shanghai to work in the film industry; for the film he established his own studio, Cino Motion Pictures. The single-system camera used on the film was borrowed from a Mr Lemmens, a teacher at the Technische Hoogeschool in Bandung (now the Bandung Institute of Technology). The film was based on the best-selling novel of the same name by Kwee Tek Hoay, which had been published over several instalments in Panorama in 1927; this story had later been adapted as a stage play by the Union Dalia Opera.

At the time, sound films had been shown in the Dutch East Indies for several years, beginning with Fox Movietone Follies of 1929 and The Rainbow Man (both 1929). The Dutch film director George Krugers had released Karnadi Anemer Bangkong the year before; although that film has been credited as the first talkie, the sinologist Leo Suryadinata gives Boenga Roos dari Tjikembang as the colony's first talkie. These early films had poor sound and lots of static.

== Release and reception ==
Boenga Roos dari Tjikembang was released in 1931. It was reportedly well received by its target audience, the ethnic Chinese, although tickets for natives remained unsold. The film critic Andjar Asmara, writing for Doenia Film, was highly critical of the film as he considered its sound quality quite poor. By the following year they had returned with another Chinese-oriented film, Sam Pek Eng Tay, based on the Chinese legend The Butterfly Lovers.

The film is likely a lost film. The American visual anthropologist Karl G. Heider writes that all Indonesian films from before 1950 are lost. However, JB Kristanto's Katalog Film Indonesia (Indonesian Film Catalogue) records several as having survived at Sinematek Indonesia's archives, and Biran writes that several Japanese propaganda films have survived at the Netherlands Government Information Service.

In 1975 Boenga Roos dari Tjikembang was remade by Fred Young and Rempo Urip under the updated title Bunga Roos dari Cikembang. Although the main points of the story remained the same, several of the Chinese names were Indonesianised: Oh Ay Cheng, for example, was renamed Wiranta, while Gwat Nio was changed to Salmah.
