= Cicurug =

Sub-district in West Java, Indonesia

Coordinates: 7°10′S 108°10′E

Cicurug is a sub-district of Sukabumi regency in West Java, Indonesia. It is situated between Bogor and Sukabumi, located approximately 100 km south of Jakarta. Cicurug is surrounded by Mount Salak and Mount Gede. Cicurug can be reached by buses plying these routes: Jakarta-Sukabumi, Bogor-Pelabuhan Ratu and Bogor-Sukabumi.

Cicurug is infamous for its appalling traffic jams, especially over holiday weekends. Radical solutions proposed by local environmental experts are expected to improve matters.
