= Nio Joe Lan =

Indonesian writer and journalist

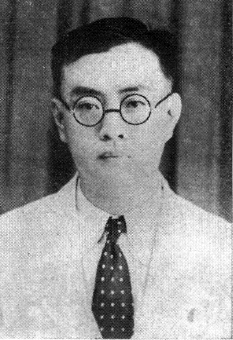
- Nio, c. 1940
- Born: 29 December 1904; Batavia, Dutch East Indies
- Died: 13 February 1973 (aged 68); Jakarta, Indonesia
- Occupation(s): Social worker, entrepreneur

Nio Joe Lan (Chinese: 梁友兰; also known by the Indonesianised name Junus Nur Arif; 29 December 1904 – 13 February 1973) was a Chinese-Indonesian writer, journalist, and history teacher.

== Biography ==
Nio was born on 29 December 1904 in Batavia, Dutch East Indies (now Jakarta, Indonesia), the son of a rich batik merchant and his wife. Other sources state that he was born in Paalmerah, Djambi Residency. He had a varied education, doing elementary school at a Hollandsch Chineesche School, home-schooling in the Chinese language, and intermediate schooling in a Bible School and at the Koningin Wilhelmina School; as a teenager Nio began studying to become an aircraft maintenance engineer, a trade rare in the Dutch East Indies. Although he completed his studies in 1924, Nio was unable to enter the field; his father had died recently and his mother had been cheated out of the factory. Instead Nio, with the help of Lauw Giok Lan, his classmate's father, became a journalist with the newspaper Keng Po and the magazine Penghiboer. From 1928 to 1935 he served as Keng Po's editor before a reorganization in 1935 when he left for Sin Po, a competing paper.

After transferring to Sin Po, Nio generally avoided mixing politics with his journalism, focusing instead on culture. Meanwhile, he wrote articles on various topics, including Chinese Malay literature, in Dutch journals such as De Indische Gids as well as English ones such as The China Journal. He was considered to be one of the main Malay-language writers about Chinese culture in his time; he also published a now-classic Dutch-language piece about Sino-Malay literature in De Indische Gids in 1937. By this time he had become active in social work with the Tiong Hoa Hwee Koan, serving as its secretary. In 1939 Nio was part of a team which wrote a book commemorating the Tiong Hoa Hwee Koan's 40th anniversary. Sensing the cultural shift, by 1940 he stopped writing in English and Dutch and wrote almost exclusively in Indonesian.

When the Japanese occupied the Indies in February 1942, Nio was one of at least 542 ethnic Chinese from Java and Madura who were arrested and detained. He was held in Bukit Duri, then Serang, and then Cimahi, before ultimately being released in 1945 after the Japanese surrender and Indonesian proclamation of independence. A written account of his experiences while an internee was published in 1946, with the title Dalem Tawanan Djepang. Sinologist Myra Sidharta describes it as valuable account of history, as other former prisoners did not write such detailed memoirs.

Following his release Nio returned to Batavia (since renamed Jakarta) and Sin Po (which had recently restarted publication after three years of inactivity), heading that newspaper until 1958. At the same time he established the family-magazine Pantja Warna (1947–56). In the late 1950s Nio enrolled himself at the Jakarta Teachers' College, studying history. By 1963 he was a lecturer there, teaching history, while working freelance to translate works of Chinese literature, including parts of the Romance of the Three Kingdoms, the Ballad of Hua Mulan, and The Creation of the Gods. After 1965 he began writing more on the ethnic Dutch of the Indies.

Nio continued writing until 1972, dying on 13 February of the following year. According to Sidharta, during his life Nio produced almost 200 written works; nearly all were about the ethnic Chinese in Indonesia.

== Partial bibliography ==
Some of Nio's works are listed below:

- Riwayat 40 Taon T.H.H.K. Batavia (History of 40 Years of T.H.H.K. Batavia; 1940)
- Dalem Tawanan Djepang (In Japanese Prison Camps; 1946)
- Peradaban Tionghoa Selajang Pandang (An Overview of Chinese Wisdom; 1961)
- Sastera Indonesia-Tionghoa (Chinese-Indonesian Literature; 1962)
- Punjtak-puntjak Kisah Tiga Negara (Highlights of the Romance of Three Kingdoms; 1963)
- Sastera Tiongkok Sepintas Lalu (An Overview of Chinese Literature; 1966).

== Works cited ==
- "Nio Joe Lan". Encyclopedia of Jakarta (in Indonesian). Jakarta City Government. Archived from the original on 27 September 2013.
- "Nio Joe Lan" (in Indonesian). Kepustakaan Populer Gramedia. Archived from the original on 29 September 2013.
- Setiono, Benny G. (2008). Tionghoa dalam Pusaran Politik [Indonesia's Chinese Community under Political Turmoil]. Jakarta: TransMedia Pustaka. ISBN 978-979-799-052-7.
- Sidharta, Myra (2008). "Pengantar Ahli" [Expert's Introduction]. Dalem Tawanan Djepang [In Japanese Prison Camps] (in Indonesian). Jakarta: Komunitas Bambu. pp. xiii–xvii. ISBN 978-979-3731-31-5.
- Suryadinata, Leo (1995). Prominent Indonesian Chinese: Biographical Sketches. Singapore: Institute of Southeast Asian Studies. ISBN 978-981-3055-04-9.
- Salmon, Claudine (1981). Literature in Malay by the Chinese of Indonesia : a provisional annotated bibliography. Paris: Editions de la Maison des sciences de l'homme. p. 258. ISBN 9780835705929.
