= Chinese Malay literature =

Chinese Malay literature is the literature of Overseas Chinese in predominant Malay regions, especially Malaysia. It is written in a variety of languages including Malay, English, and Chinese dialects like Mandarin Chinese and Hokkien, and also creoles and mixed languages based on these.

== See also ==
- Malaysian literature
- Indonesian literature
- Chinese literature
- Nanyang
