= Kho Tjoen Wan =

Dutch East Indies Chinese journalist

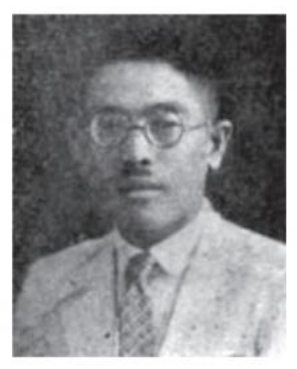
- Born: Brebes, Dutch East Indies
- Died: Pekalongan, Indonesia
- Occupations: journalist, political activist

Kho Tjoen Wan (Chinese: 许俊源, c. 1900–1970s), sometimes spelled Kho Tjoen Gwan, was a Chinese Indonesian journalist, writer and political activist active mainly from the 1910s to the 1930s in the Dutch East Indies. He was involved with the Communist Party of Indonesia in the 1920s and may have been its first ethnically Chinese executive member.

== Biography ==
Kho Tjoen Wan was born in the early twentieth century into a poor Chinese family in Brebes, Central Java, Dutch East Indies. He apparently had no formal education and was forced to start working at eight years old. By age 10 he left Brebes for the capital Batavia, where he started work as an assistant at Perniagaan, a Chinese-owned Malay language paper with a conservative ideology. During that time he also gained some kind of basic education and soon started contributing writing to the paper as well. He also became an editor at a Dutch-run paper called Soeara Kebenaran.

During the 1910s, a period which saw the rise of the Sarekat Islam and other radical movements in Java, Kho became increasingly attracted to left wing and anticolonial politics. In 1916 he began writing for Sinar Hindia, a Semarang-based paper with a left wing orientation. In the fall of 1916 he also published a book-length poem entitled Boekoe Sair Indie-Weerbaar (Indies defense syair book). The book, which criticized the controversial proposal for a conscript army of Indies natives, earned him a 3 month jail term in 1917 under the strict Dutch censorship laws.

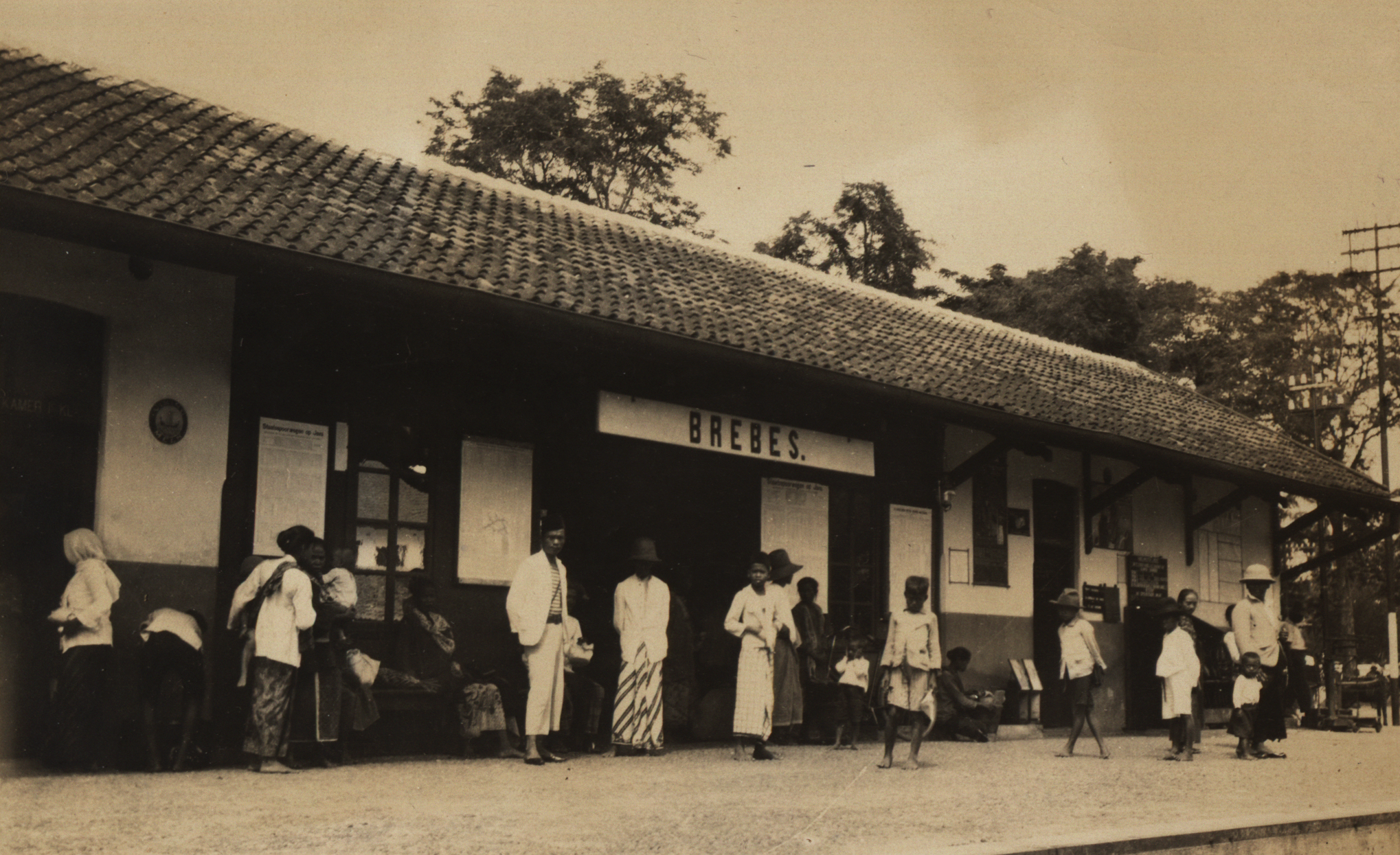
The train station in Brebes, 1930s

His Chinese identity was also important to him. In 1917, after he was released from jail, he left Batavia and returned to Brebes, where he founded a new chapter of the Tiong Hoa Hwee Koan (a Chinese Indonesian education and self-improvement organization). He also spent time in Semarang, which was then a major centre of left-wing radicalism in the Indies, although it seems he still lived part of the time in Brebes for several more years. He continued to write for Sinar Hindia as well as Warna Warta and Djawa Tengah, the two biggest Chinese-owned daily newspapers in Semarang. He was jailed again for a polemic he published in Warna Warta titled "The Battered World" (Doenia Bondjol). He also published an editorial piece in 1919 criticizing the Indonesian nationalist press, in particular the paper Oetoesan Hindia, for the anti-Chinese language it used.

In August 1920 he was once again called before the local court for writing critically in Warna Warta about proposals for a native militia in the Indies; he stated that the Dutch wished to turn Indies natives and Chinese into cannon fodder. As criticism of colonial authorities or policy were strictly forbidden, in November he was sentenced to 4 months in jail for "hatred and contempt of the government". Like many of his fellow journalists, he also published translations, notably in serialized form in Djawa Tengah; in 1922 his Malay-language translation of an unknown 1911 work set in Central Java called Nona Maria was published in book form. He also left his role as lead editor at Warna Warta in January 1922 and joined the board of another publication, Fadjar, which was published in Cirebon.

In 1921 the Communist Party of Indonesia (PKI) was founded; Kho, who knew its leaders from his time working at Sinar Hindia, joined it at some point during its early years. He became a close ally of its leader Semaun and was appointed as commissioner of the Semarang branch in 1924, representing the city at the PKI congress in June of that year. According to Ruth McVey he may have been the first ethnically Chinese executive members of the party. He was also active in other left-wing organizations in the city; he was treasurer of the Sugar Worker's Union (Perserikatan Kaoem Boeroeh Goela) and commissioner of a miner's group (Koempoelan Tambang), and sat on an inter-ethnic respect committee (Comité Kehormatan Bangsa). In April 1925 he was nominated to become editor-in-chief of a new communist-affiliated magazine Petjoet ("the whip"), but due to lack of funds the magazine never entered publication.

During the period mass arrests of communists in 1926-7, following a failed uprising, he began to receive increased scrutiny from the political police. He was arrested in Kudus in November 1926 and interrogated about his beliefs and involvement in the communist movement. but unlike most of his fellows he was not exiled to Boven-Digoel concentration camp and was soon released.

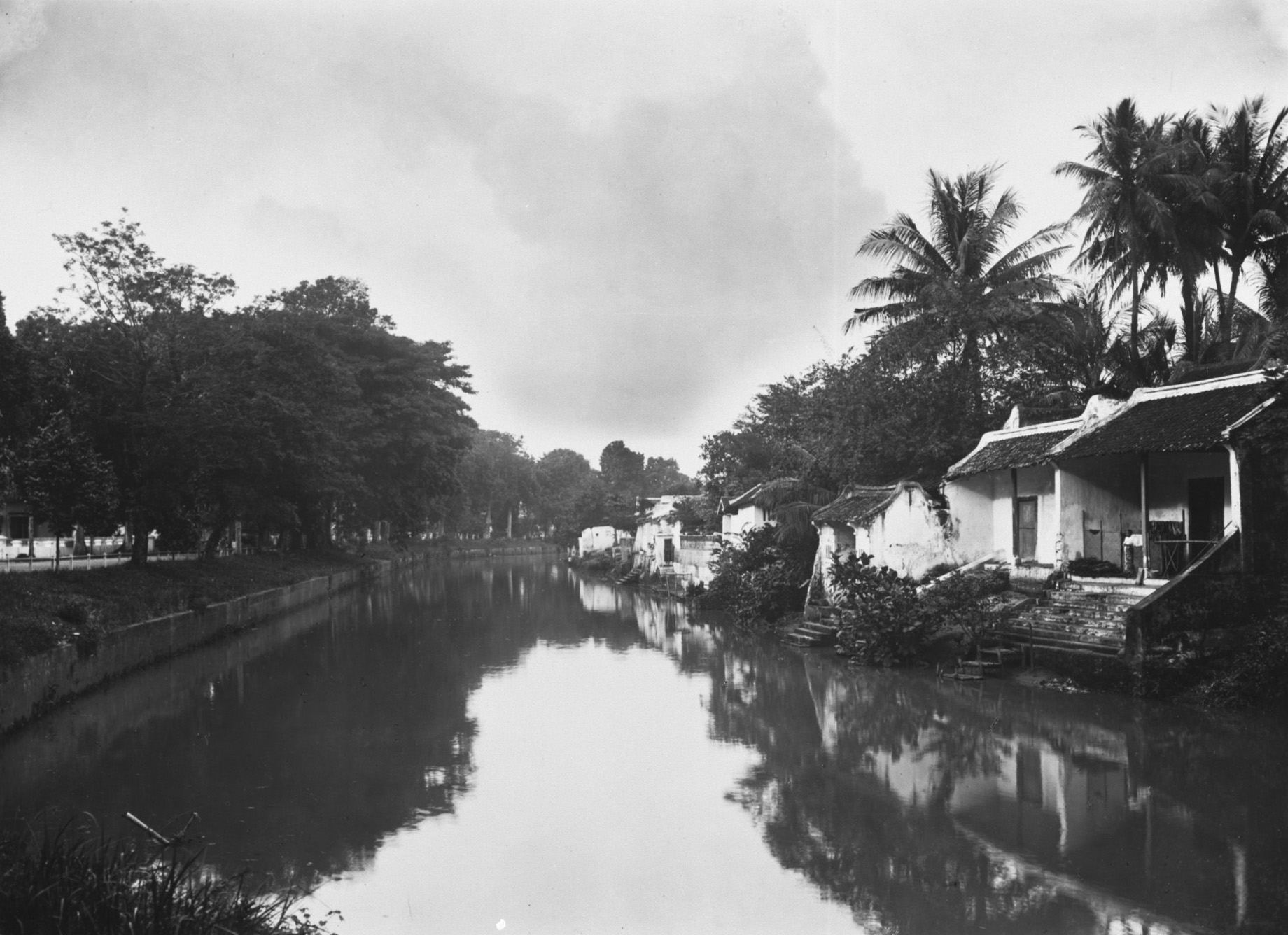
Houses in Pekalongan, 1920s-30s

In 1931 he was jailed by the Dutch in Pekalongan for participating in "racial conflicts". He then made a failed attempted to found a Partai Tionghoa Indonesia (Chinese Indonesian party) chapter in Kudus in 1932. By the mid-1930s, a time of extreme political repression in the Indies, he seems to have abandoned politics completely and became mainly interested in mysticism. What he did for the rest of the 1930s is not well documented, but by 1940 he was again working as editor of a magazine Economy in Pekalongan under Tan Kiem Swie. He was also interviewed by the political police in early 1941, not long before the Japanese invasion of the Dutch East Indies, over reports of Japanese manipulation of the Chinese press and attempts to sow discord between Indies-born and foreign-born Chinese. It seems that he had been one of the editors the Japanese had approached, but that he had turned down their offer.

Little is known about his activities during the 1940s and 1950s, which saw Indonesia gain its independence from the Dutch. In the 1960s he worked as an advisor to Parama Arta, a magazine dealing with mysticism.

He died in Pekalongan, Central Java, in the 1970s.
