= Tjhoen Tjhioe =

Tjhoen Tjhioe (Chinese: 春秋; Pe̍h-ōe-jī: Chhun-chhiu; 'Spring and Autumn' in Chinese) was a Malay language Peranakan Chinese newspaper from Surabaya, Dutch East Indies catering mainly to the Chinese population. The full title of the paper was Tjhoen Tjhioe: Soerat kabar dagang bahasa Melajoe jang moeat roepa kabar penting bagi bangsa Tionghoa (Malay: Tjhoen Tjhioe: Malay language Business newspaper containing important news for the Chinese nation). Although the paper only existed for a short time (from 1914 to 1918), during that time it was recognized as one of the top Chinese newspapers in the Indies, alongside Sin Po and Perniagaan.

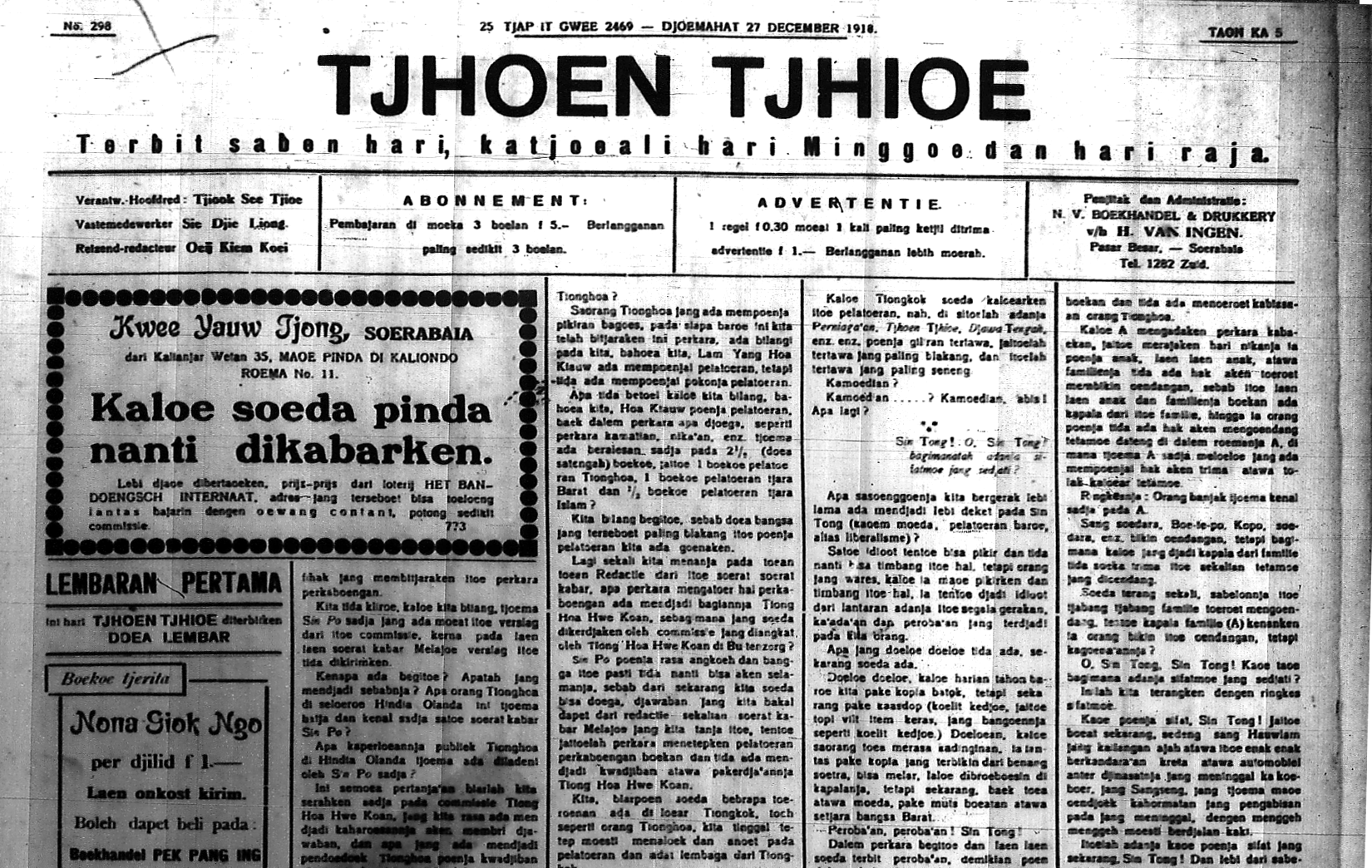
Cover page of Tjhoen Tjhioe from December 27, 1918.

== History ==
The need for a new Peranakan Chinese newspaper in Surabaya was proposed in 1913, and it was suggested that Henri Borel, a Dutch Sinologist and writer who was in Europe at that time, return to the Indies and become its editor. The paper was explicitly intended to defend the Indies Chinese community, and particular that in Surabaya, and to cover news that might cause harm to that community. The salary being suggested to attract Borel was initially set at 1000 guilders per month, although when he took the job it was eventually reduced to 150 guilders. In the first issue in early 1914, Borel wrote an introductory essay which paid homage to Confucius and his ideas, and insisted that the paper would stand up for the brotherhood of all peoples.

Starting from 1914, the Peranakan Chinese intellectual Kwee Hing Tjiat was editor of the paper as well. He had founded an earlier paper in Surabaya called Bok Tok which, according to historian Leo Suryadinata, was a sort of predecessor to Tjhoen Tjhioe. According to historian Ahmat Adam, Tjhoen Tjhioe had a circulation 4,000 subscribers in 1914, mainly from the Peranakan Chinese community.

In its first year of publication, Tjhoen Tjhioe engaged in a war of words with Doenia Bergerak (Malay: World in motion), a left-wing paper associated with the Sarekat Islam movement. Tjhoen Tjhioe denounced that paper for using derogatory words for Chinese people such as babah or tjina, rather than employing the more respectful term tionghoa (Malay: Chinese). Like its more popular competitor Sin Po, Tjhoen Tjhioe strongly defended the Chinese community and became increasingly influenced by Chinese nationalist ideas. Historian Leo Suryadinata states that the paper had a "China orientation", that is an outlook that thought Chinese Indonesians should be focused on China and not on the Dutch East Indies.

At the start of 1915 Henri Borel left the paper to become editor-in-chief of Bataviaasch Nieuwsblad. Rumours soon began to be printed in other papers that he had actually been fired from Tjhoen Tjhioe. These stated that he had been paid 150 guilders per month for the title of editor but did very little to justify the salary. Borel's replacement was apparently Tjan Kiem Bie, who was editor-in-chief in 1915 and 1916. Although it is unclear at what point he took the position, the novelist and journalist Tan Boen Kim must have been editor at the paper in 1915 as well, because he was charged under the strict press censorship laws (Persdelict) for defamation of a public official, and sentenced to fourteen days in prison.

The next editor was Tjoe Bou San, who briefly held the post in 1917.

Liem Koen Hian also worked for the paper, although the exact years are unclear. During his tenure there, he was very critical of the Dutch policy towards the Indonesian Chinese, notably the Dutch Nationality Law being proposed at the time, although he was careful to print his criticism in other newspapers such as Soerabaiasche Handelsblad.

In the spring of 1918 the paper published an essay that soon being discussed more widely in the Dutch language press of the Indies. The article, by Tjondrokoesoemo, an elite Javanese who worked as an editor for various Chinese newspapers in his career (notably Djawa Tengah and Warna Warta), proposed that a new organization should be founded called Sarekat Tionghoa (Malay: Chinese Union) which could exist alongside the Sarekat Islam, which represented Muslim Indonesians.

The final editor of the paper may have been Tjiook See Tjioe, who is listed as editor in Dutch documents in 1918.

According to the Cornell University library catalogue the paper may have ceased publication in 1918. The circumstances of its end are unclear.
