= Tan Boen Kim =

Tan Boen Kim (1887-1959) was a Peranakan Chinese journalist and novelist from Batavia (now Jakarta), Dutch East Indies.

He was apparently a self-taught writer, and while working as a bank clerk he started writing for the Batavia newspaper Sin Po where he had a column Zaterdagsch Causerie under the pseudonym Indo China. He also started publishing novels in 1912. In 1915 he was invited to become editor of the Surabaya paper Tjhoen Tjhioe, but by 1917 he was already back in Batavia and became editor of Ien Po and Kong Po. During his time as editor of Tjhoen Tjhioe, he was charged with a Persdelict offense under the strict Dutch press censorship laws, for defaming a public official, and sentenced to 14 days in prison. During this time he continued publishing a number of novels loosely based on current events, in particular crimes. He wrote a novelized account of the 1918 Kudus riot, a 1918 anti-Chinese riot in Semarang Regency, and another about the murder of Fientje de Feniks.

In 1927 he founded a paper in Palembang called Kiouw Pao.

In his final years he became interested in astrology and published a number of books about it. According to Claudine Salmon, he spent his final years living in extreme poverty in a room belonging to the Jinde Yuan, a Chinese temple in Jakarta.
