= Pouw Kioe An =

Indonesian writer and journalist

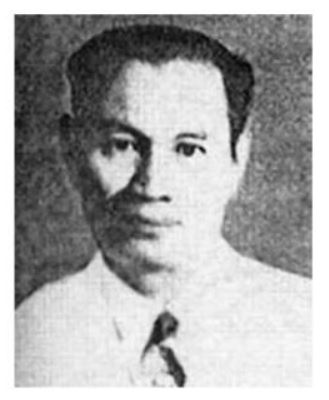
- Born: 3 January 1906; Cianjur, Dutch East Indies
- Died: 25 March 1981 (aged 75); Malang, Indonesia
- Other name: Sastradjaja
- Occupations: Journalist, novelist, playwright, newspaper editor
- Years active: 1923–1960s

Pouw Kioe An (Chinese: 包求安, 1906–1981, known later in life by the Indonesian name Sastradjaja) was a Peranakan Chinese journalist, novelist, newspaper editor and translator from the Dutch East Indies who was active from the 1920s to the 1950s. He worked for most of the main Chinese Indonesian newspapers in Java during that time and published original novels and translations prolifically.

== Biography ==
Pouw Kioe An was born in Cianjur, West Java, Dutch East Indies (now Indonesia) on 3 January 1906. He was educated at a Dutch-language Europeesche Lagere School in Cianjur. He converted to Christianity as a boy. After graduating from school, he worked at his family's rice mill until he became interested in journalism.

In 1923 he started writing for Perniagaan, a conservative Malay-language Chinese newspaper from the capital Batavia, as well as Lay Po from Bandung, both papers run by Tio Ie Soei. In 1925 he moved to Semarang in Central Java to work for Warna Warta, another Malay-language Chinese paper, as well as the literary magazine Kemadjoean (progress). However, he didn't stay long in Semarang and relocated to Surabaya in East Java to write for Soeara Poebliek (public voice). In December 1926 he became editor-in-chief of Pewarta Soerabaja. During this time he began to write and publish fiction as well; his first novel Machloek jang lemah (a weak creature) was published in Kemadjoean in 1929. It depicted a young Chinese boy who was torn between the love of a Dutch girl and a Chinese girl.

In the early 1930s he began to publish serialized translations of Western fiction as well, including Victor Hugo and Alexandre Dumas. In 1932 he left Pewarta Soerabaja and joined Kwee Tek Hoay's monthly Moestika Romans.

In 1933 he became editor-in-chief of Sin Tit Po, a daily paper in Surabaya, but only stayed there for a year.

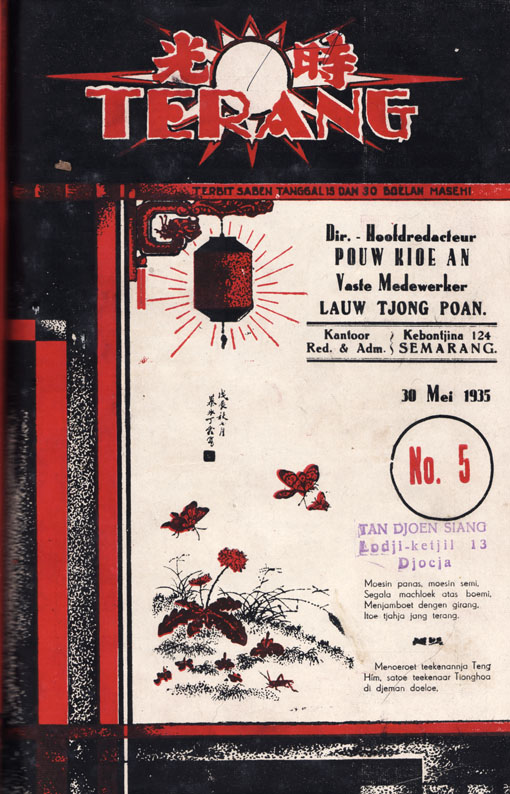
The 30 May 1935 cover of an issue of Terang magazine.

In 1934 he relocated to Tasikmalaya in West Java where he cofounded a weekly called Pantja Warna. He also wrote his first play during this time, Boeat saja atawa orang banjak (for me or the crowd), which was published in Djawa Tengah Review. Pantja Warna folded within a year, and in 1935 he founded yet another magazine, the twice-monthly Terang (clear) printed in Semarang. The magazine merged with another and relaunched as Motorblad-Terang. Throughout the 1930s he continued to write novels, often morality tales or dramatized crime stories; number of these were published in the literary magazine Tjerita Roman. Some of his stories, including his most famous morality tale O, Perempuan! were staged as plays in Surabaya and Semarang as well.

In 1936 he became editor-in-chief of Soeara Semarang (voice of Semarang), as well as editor at a new daily Swara Kita (our voice), at Djawa Tengah ('Central Java', the biggest Chinese newspaper in Semarang) and a writer for Mata Hari (sun). His tenure at Djawa Tengah was quite short; he was only there for three months. At the end of the 1930s he relocated to Malang, East Java, where he wrote for Liberty and Star Magazine.

During the Japanese occupation of the Dutch East Indies he was and a number of Chinese Indonesian intellectuals in Malang were targeted and jailed by the Japanese. After the Japanese departure, in 1946, he founded a short-lived weekly magazine called Bok Tok. He also published an account of his imprisonment called 198 Hari Dalem Koengkoengan Kenpeitai (198 days in Kempeitai detention). During this period some of his plays were again performed as radio plays on the newly founded Radio Republik Indonesia, on the stage in Malang. In 1950 he launched another digest magazine called Amica and was also on the editorial board of a Jakarta-based magazined called Sedar. He became editor-in-chief at the Malang Post newspaper, founded in 1947, for much of the 1950s and 1960s as well. He spent his old age in Malang where he continued to write for Liberty, especially on the topics of religion and astrology.

He died on 25 March 1981.
