= Liem Thian Joe =

Late colonial Indonesian historian

Liem Thian Joe (1895–1962) was a late colonial Indonesian historian, newspaper editor, journalist and writer of Peranakan Chinese background. He is best known today for his seminal Riwajat Semarang, 1416–1931, a historical overview of Semarang's Chinese community. He is cited by some as the first peranakan Chinese historian to write in Malay using the 'modern' historical method.

== Biography ==
Born in 1895 in Parakan, Central Java, Dutch East Indies (now Indonesia), Liem Thian Joe received his earliest education at local Malay and Javanese schools. He subsequently attended a Hokkien school for ten years, then the Tiong Hoa Hak Tong in Ngadirejo, a school founded and run by the Confucian organization Tiong Hoa Hwee Koan.

Despite his talent for writing, Liem initially worked as a trader in Ngadirejo. He began his writing career in the early 1920s as a journalist for Warna Warta, a Semarang daily, and possibly also for the Batavia-based newspaper Perniagaan. In the early 1930s, Liem joined the editorial board of another Semarang daily Djawa Tengah and its sister monthly Djawa Tengah Review. Around the same time, Liem began - in 1938 - to edit yet another Semarang monthly, Mimbar Melajoe also contributed to the prominent, Batavia-based weekly Sin Po.

Liem wrote Riwajat Semarang as a series of articles for Djawa Tengah Review from March 1931 until July 1933, before having it published in book form by Ho Kim Yoe in 1933. In the book, he coined the term Cabang Atas, Malay for 'upper branch', to describe the baba bangsawan or the Chinese gentry of colonial Indonesia. Riwajat Semarang, while focused on the history of Semarang's Chinese community, is also an invaluable source for the history of Central Java, particularly of Semarang, since Liem was still able to access the now lost archives of the Kong Koan (or the 'Chinese Council') of Semarang, the city's peak Chinese government body.

He is also the anonymous author of Boekoe Peringetan Tiong Hoa Siang Hwee 1907-1937, an anniversary book of Semarang's Chinese Chamber of Commerce, published in 1937. Liem's other historical works include Pusaka Tionghoa of 1952 and the unpublished Riwajat Kian Gwan, a history of Southeast Asia's largest conglomerate at the time, Kian Gwan, completed in 1959.

Liem died in Semarang in February 1962.
