= Lauw Giok Lan =

Chinese Indonesian journalist and writer

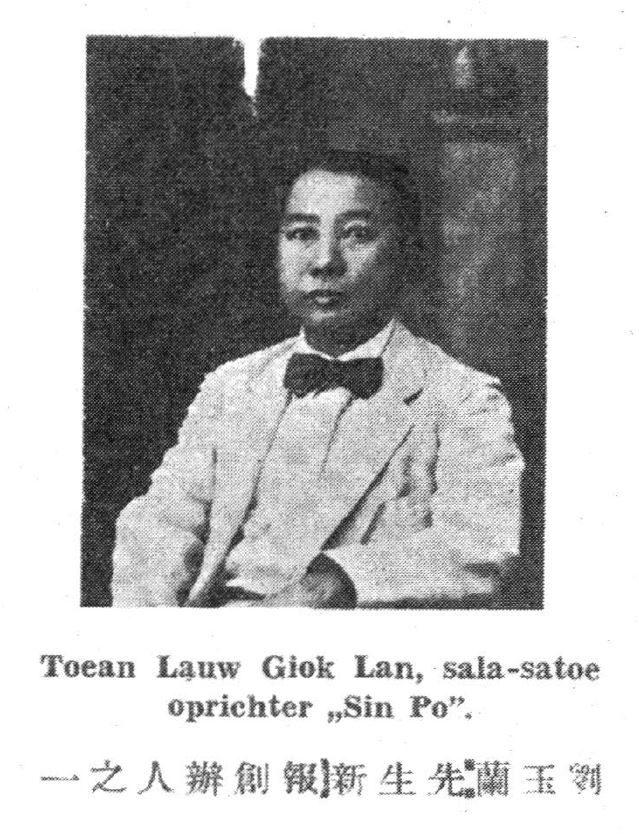
- Portrait of Lauw Giok Lan, Chinese Indonesian journalist and co-founder of Sin Po
- Born: 1883; Batavia, Dutch East Indies
- Died: 1953 (age 70)
- Occupation(s): Writer, journalist
- Years active: 1890s–1920s
- Spouse: Lie On Moy
- Children: Lauw Soei Goan

Lauw Giok Lan (traditional Chinese: 劉玉蘭; simplified Chinese: 刘玉兰; pinyin: Liú Yùlán; Pe̍h-ōe-jī: Lâu Gio̍k-lân; 1883–1953) was a Chinese Indonesian journalist and writer. He was one of the founders of the newspaper Sin Po.

== Biography ==
Lauw was born in Batavia, Dutch East Indies, in 1883. He undertook an education at a Hokkien school, but also learned to speak Dutch. In 1890, Lauw's father died, and he was raised by his mother, a seamstress. By age sixteen he had entered the workforce, first at a shop in Glodok run by Khouw Lam Tjiang then for the printer van Dorp. This latter job introduced Lauw to journalism, as van Dorp printed both the daily Bintang Betawi and the monthly Java Bode. At some point around the turn of the century he married Lie On Moy, a Peranakan Chinese woman born in Padang, who would also become a translator and journalist.

Pendidikan jang Kliroe (1922)

In the early 1900s Lauw began working for Sinar Betawi; by 1907 he was working as editor for the daily Perniagaan, together with Tio Ie Soei and Thio Tjin Boen. Working with Yoe Sin Gie, on 1 October 1910 he established the weekly (later daily) Sin Po; when it was incorporated in February 1912, Lauw was one of five stockholders. He is recorded as assistant editor, under JR Razoux Kohr, several months later.

Lauw established another weekly, the short-lasting Penghiboer, in 1913. Ten years later he became the editor-in-chief of Sin Po, but soon sold all shares in the company and moved to Bandung, where he worked with the monthly magazine Lay Po (later Sin Bin). He returned to Batavia in 1925, and by 1928 he was a regular contributor to Keng Po (run by Hauw Tek Kong). While working with Keng Po, Lauw helped Nio Joe Lan find work at the newspaper; Nio would go on to become an editor of Sin Po.

Aside from journalism, Lauw was involved in the emerging literature of the East Indies. After Lie Kim Hok's death in 1912, Lauw completed the writer's ongoing translation of Hugo Hartmann's Dolores, de Verkochte Vrouw, publishing it as Prampoean jang Terdjoewal. In 1913 he published a Malay translation of Victor Ido's Karina Adinda; at the time it was one of only a few published Malay-language stage plays. In his foreword to the translation, Lauw wrote that he wanted to improve the quality of stage plays performed by Chinese Indonesians, which were facing competition from the burgeoning film industry as well as the bangsawan and stamboel theatrical genres. He also published his own stage play, Pendidikan jang Kliroe, in 1922. He published two further books in 1924, Brillian jang Tertjoeri and Riwajat Hindia Olanda.

Lauw was also involved in various social organizations. He was a money collector for the Tiong Hoa Hwee Koan in 1907, and from 1907 to 1912 he served as an administrator and secretary for the Cheng Hwa Hui.

Lauw died in 1953. He was survived by his wife, Lie On Moy.

== Works cited ==
- Kwee, Tek Hoay (1919). Allah jang Palsoe [The False God] (in Malay). Batavia: Tjiong Koen Bie.
- Nio, Joe Lan (1962). Sastera Indonesia-Tionghoa [Indonesian-Chinese Literature] (in Indonesian). Jakarta: Gunung Agung. OCLC 3094508.
- Setyautama, Sam (2008). Mihardja, Suma (ed.). Tokoh-Tokoh Etnis Tionghoa di Indonesia. Jakarta: Kepustakaan Populer Gramedia. ISBN 978-979-9101-25-9.
- Sidharta, Myra (2008). "Pengantar Ahli" [Expert's Introduction]. Dalem Tawanan Djepang [In Japanese Prison Camps] (in Indonesian). Jakarta: Komunitas Bambu. pp. xiii–xvii. ISBN 978-979-3731-31-5.
- Sumardjo, Jakob (1992). Perkembangan Teater Modern dan Sastra Drama Indonesia [Development of Modern Theatre and Literary Drama in Indonesia] (in Indonesian). Bandung: Citra Aditya Bakti. ISBN 978-979-414-615-6.
- Suryadinata, Leo (1995). Prominent Indonesian Chinese: Biographical Sketches. Singapore: Institute of Southeast Asian Studies. ISBN 978-981-3055-04-9.
- Tio, Ie Soei (1958). Lie Kimhok 1853–1912 (in Indonesian). Bandung: Good Luck. OCLC 1069407.
