= Chunqiu =

Chunqiu or Ch'un-ch'iu, literally Spring(s) and Autumn(s), may refer to:

- Spring and Autumn Annals, the annals of the State of Lu covering the years 722–481 BC
- Spring and Autumn period (roughly 771–476 BC), named after the annals
- Several other ancient Chinese annals
  - Lüshi Chunqiu
  - Yanzi chunqiu
  - Spring and Autumn Annals of Wu and Yue
  - Spring and Autumn Annals of the Sixteen Kingdoms
  - Spring and Autumn Annals of the Ten Kingdoms
- Tjhoen Tjhioe, a 1910s Malay-language Peranakan Chinese newspaper from Surabaya, Dutch East Indies

== See also ==
- Spring Airlines, also known as Chunqiu Airlines, a Chinese airline carrier
