= J. R. Razoux Kühr =

Jacobus Rudolph Razoux Kühr, commonly known as J. R. Razoux Kühr or Jack Razoux Kühr (born 1882 in Ternate, Dutch East Indies - died 1958 Nijmegen, Netherlands) was an Indo civil servant and businessman from the Dutch East Indies largely remembered for being one of the first editors of the popular Chinese Indonesian newspaper Sin Po.

== Biography ==
=== Early life ===
Razoux Kühr was born to an Indo family in Ternate, Maluku Islands, Dutch East Indies on 17 January 1882. The family descended from J.R.'s grandfather, Cornelis Kühr, who had left Delft for a civil service post in the Indies and had married an Indo woman in Semarang named Helena Johanna du Riel Razoux. His father, a civil servant in Semarang and later Ternate, was named Johan George Razoux Kühr and his mother Jeanne Elisabeth Van Essel; J.R. was the sixth out of eight children. From around 1897 to 1901, he completed Hogere Burgerschool schooling at the Koning Willem III School in Batavia. During his time at the school he co-edited a weekly publication with F.B. Smits called Vox Juvenum. After that he did a round of training in what was called Indologische Instelling, which prepared students for a career in the Indies civil service. During that time he had a particular affinity for the English language and was known as an anglophile. He married his wife Petronella Jacoba Vogelzang, an Indo woman from Surabaya, in November 1904.

=== Civil servant career and dismissal ===
After passing his civil service exam in 1904, J.R. took up various posts as controleur in the internal administration, notably in Borneo. In February 1907, his first son Rudolf was born. His civil service career soon began to unravel. He was granted medical leave to return from Borneo to Batavia in the spring of 1907, but people complained that he was often seen conducting subcontracting business in Tanjung Priok. There was soon a petition to dismiss him from the civil service, since he appeared to be recruiting and dispatching Coolies for a private company in Batavia while still on leave as a government employee. Other allegations surfaced that he had engaged in dubious currency exchanges while in office in Borneo; for that, he was called to court and eventually acquitted, but was discharged from public office. He later claimed that he had voluntarily resigned in June 1907.

After that he started to engage in various lucrative private enterprises. In 1908 he became director of a new Batavia dairy trading company called The Australian Dairy Ltd. He then got a job in a private "immigration office", recruiting Coolies to work on plantations in Java and Sumatra. He soon obtained a personal yacht which he used to regularly travel back and forth between Batavia and Singapore. He moved to Singapore and started his own Coolie recruitment company, The Straits Immigration Syndicate, to send them to work in the Federated Malay States. Eventually he fell afoul of the law and was sentenced to several years in prison for his dubious business practices. It was in July 1910 that police were waiting for him as he sailed into Batavia, and he was arrested and imprisoned in Weltevreden.

In 1910 his second child, Nelly, was born.

=== Return to Batavia and Newspaper career ===
In response to his legal troubles, J.R. published an English-language pamphlet in 1911: Dutch justice in Java. Are the Dutch worthy of this beautiful island with its 35,000,000 inhabitants? Startling Revelations. In the book he raged at the injustice of the Dutch legal system and hinted that the Indies might be better under English rule. The reaction of the Dutch press in the Indies to this book was quite negative, not least because it appeared to have been published in English in order to gain foreign sympathy for his case and against the Indies government.

Deciding to change careers yet again, J.R. studied Zincography under an expert named Schmidt, who himself had also been accused of using his techniques for counterfeiting banknotes. It was eventually suspected, but never proven, that J.R. had entered into banknote counterfeiting himself.

Having obtained those technical printing skills, and due to his deep connections to the Peranakan Chinese community in Batavia, he took up a post as editor-in-chief of a new Chinese newspaper, Sin Po, in April 1912. Despite the Chinese ownership of the paper, it was common practice at that time to have a European or Indo editor who would be treated less harshly by the colonial legal system. He was still not free from legal vulnerability; in 1913 he was sentenced to 2 weeks in prison under the strict press offense laws (persdelict) for something he had printed in Sin Po. He would describe one such imprisonment in 1916 in the Dutch journal De Reflector. Not unlike his book about legal injustice in the Indies, he often railed against the government in the pages of Sin Po, and gained the sympathy of many progressive young Chinese.

Allegations circulated that, under his rule, the paper would sometimes accept payment from subjects of stories to travel and listen to their 'injustices'. He held the post until March 1916, when stepped down as editor, ostensibly for health reasons, suggesting publicly that he was planning to relocate to Bandung with its cooler climate. There, he tried to set up a new newspaper using Chinese funding, named Pertimbangan (Judgement), but it did not last long. He was also announced to be the new editor of De Indier in 1917, but that was also apparently short-lived.

By early 1918 however, he took up a similar post once again as editor-in-chief of Sin Po's rival paper, Perniagaan. It is unclear how long he lasted there (perhaps into late 1918 or early 1919), and he never again held a job in journalism. However, during his short time there he was sentenced to a 100 guilders fine or one month in prison under a press offense (Persdelict) charge for insulting the good name of Hauw Tek Kong, then director of Sin Po. It is unclear what the substance of the case was.

At some point in 1919 he then relocated to Cheribon where he had been offered a position as executor to the estate of a recently deceased Chinese Officer.

== Murder trial ==
In 1921, Razoux Kühr was arrested for the murder of H. van der Hilst, a machinist in the colonial navy who lived in Cheribon. The incident happened in the evening of 31 December 1920, when van der Hilst was shot in the abdomen by a Beaumont rifle, dying almost instantly. What came out in the trial was that Razoux Kühr's wife, fearing for her life, had fled to van der Hilst's house, and that Razoux Kühr showed up in his yard and shot him through the door. Razoux Kühr claimed that he had the rifle because was feeling suicidal over his wife's departure, and that he had only intended to talk to her when it went off by accident and killed van der Hilst. The court did not believe this story, but could not prove premeditation. He was charged with manslaughter and sentenced to ten years in prison.

=== Life after release from prison ===
It is unclear what Razoux Kühr did after his prison sentence. He was apparently released in 1929 and lived briefly in Batavia before relocating to Cheribon once again. Decades later, in 1958, he remarried to a Chinese woman named Gwat Loen Nio Tan and travelled to the Netherlands. Their departure may have been related to the West New Guinea dispute between Indonesia and the Netherlands, since Tan's name was on a published list of evacuees being repatriated as a result of Indonesian measures against Dutch interests in the country. Razoux Kühr died on 13 July 1958 in Ubbergen, on the outskirts of Nijmegen, Netherlands at age 76.
