= Yoe Sin Gie =

Peranakan Chinese businessman and newspaper owner

Yoe Sin Gie (Chinese: 海信義; Pe̍h-ōe-jī: Hái Sìn-gī) (1880-1957), sometimes spelled Joe Sin Gie, was a Peranakan Chinese businessman and newspaper owner largely remembered for being one of the co-founders and first director of Sin Po, one of the most popular Chinese Indonesian newspapers of the Dutch East Indies.

== Biography ==
Yoe was born in Cirebon on May 7, 1880.

Around the years 1902 to 1909, he was working as a bookkeeper at the firm Hoa Siang In Kiok where an editor of the Malay language paper Perniagaan, Lauw Giok Lan, also worked. Yoe and Lauw came up with a plan to create their own competing newspaper, Sin Po. The paper was launched in Batavia on October 1, 1910. At first, Lauw took on the editorial duties and Yoe became director. The paper quickly became very successful and surpassed Perniagaan in readership. At around the time the paper changed from a weekly to a daily format, Yoe stepped down from his dudies there, being replaced as director on May 9, 1912, by Oey Tjioe Yong.

Aside from being involved with Sin Po, Yoe was active on the board of the Batavia branch of the Tiong Hoa Hwee Koan, a diasporic Chinese educational movement with local branches around the Indies. He was listed as a commissioner on the board during the same years he was director of Sin Po, from 1910 to 1912.

Yoe died on April 5, 1957, in Jakarta.
