= Djawa Tengah =

Malay-language Chinese Indonesian newspaper (1909-1938)

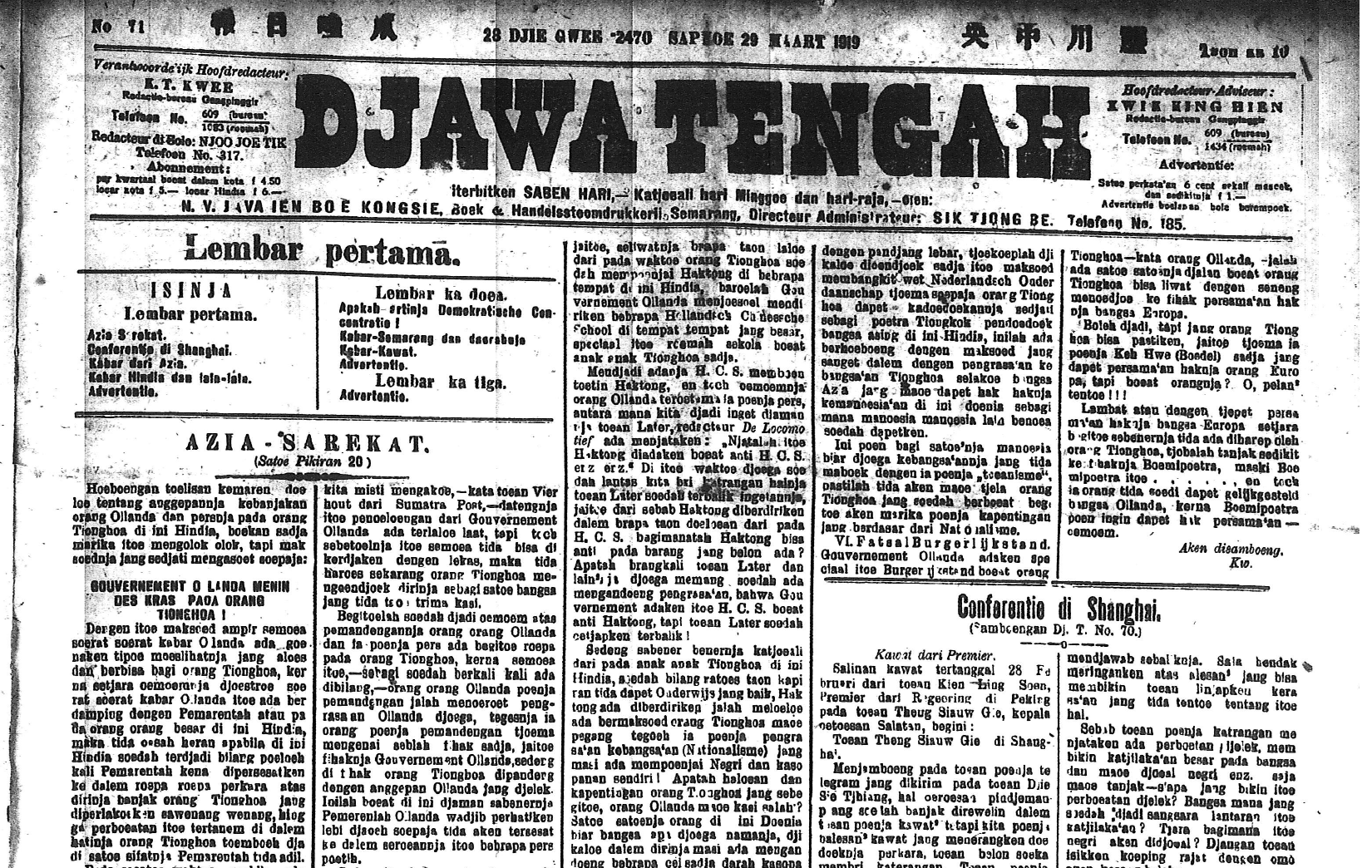
Front page of Djawa Tengah from March 29, 1919

Djawa Tengah (Malay: Central Java, known in Chinese as 壟川中央爪哇日報 Lǒngchuān Zhōngyāng Zhǎowā Rìbào) was a major Malay-language peranakan Chinese (Chinese Indonesian) daily newspaper in Semarang, Dutch East Indies from 1909 to 1938. It is said to have been the first Chinese newspaper in Semarang.

== History ==
=== H. C. Goldman ===
Djawa Tengah launched in late 1909 under the editorial direction of H.C. Goldman, who had previously been editor of another Malay-language paper, Bintang Pagi (Malay: Morning star) which had ceased publication only a month earlier. Its early issues were printed partly in Malay and partly in Chinese, although the Chinese content was soon eliminated. During the 1910s, like Sin Po in Batavia, the paper developed an editorial line was moderately Chinese nationalist and critical of the Dutch Chinese Officer system. The paper also gave fair treatment in its coverage of the Indonesian National Awakening, often giving front page coverage to the details of Sarekat Islam meetings throughout the 1910s.

By 1910 Goldman was already getting in trouble under the strict press censorship laws (Persdelict), for printing materials which "defamed" the character of state employees. He was eventually sentenced to a month in prison.

=== Tan Thwan King ===
It is unclear when Goldman stepped down as editor in chief, but by 1914 the position was held by Tan Thwan King, a journalist from Malang who also edited Tjahaja Timoer, Andalas and other newspapers during the wartime period. In 1914 Tan also became embroiled in a Persdelict case, for which he was also sentenced to a month in prison for insulting a Chinese Officer in print.

During the First World War, when the Indies were cut off from most international wire services, Djawa Tengah hired Theo Tong Hai, who had previously been editor of Sin Po, as a travelling correspondent and sent him to China and Japan try get more accurate reports about the state of things in Europe and Asia.

=== K. T. Kwee ===
After the war, Tan Thwan King apparently left his position, which was taken over by Kwee Kee Tie (usually known as K.T. Kwee), who held the position for the following decade. However, Tan continued to contribute, and wrote coverage of the 1918 Kudus riot for the paper. That riot became an important cause for the paper, and editor Kwee joined Auw Yang Kee, the Chinese consul to the Indies, on a visit to the city of Kudus to survey the damage in the week after the riot, and for several months the paper helped organize fundraising efforts for the victims.

Another editor who joined the paper around the end of the war was Raden Mas Tjondrokoesoemo, an elite Javanese who may have helped contribute to the paper's good coverage of the Sarekat Islam and other Indonesian organizations. Tjondrokoesoemo left Djawa Tengah for its competitor Warna Warta in 1921 over a dispute about his editorial independence. Another was Kwik King Hien, a writer of Malay-language novels. Most of his novels appeared in serialized form in Djawa Tengah before being published as books.

In 1922 several employees of Djawa Tengah were involved in the foundation of Chinese journalists' association, the Tjoe Piet Hwee. Although the founding meeting received delegates from other cities, almost all of the board were made up of people from Semarang, including the chairman Lauw Koug Huy, editor of competing paper Warna Warta, vice-chairman Yap Kong Hwat, a Djawa Tengah editor, and with Djawa Tengah's editor in chief Kwee as treasurer. The organization set out to defend the interests of the Indonesian Chinese and their newspapers and did not allow native Indonesians as members.

=== Chan Kok Cheng ===
In 1927, Kwee left and an English-educated economist Chan Kok Cheng, sometimes known as K. C. Chan, became the new editor-in-chief. He was very well-connected, being a close friend of Kwee Kek Beng and Liem Khoen Hien. In July of the same year Tio Tjin Boen, former editor-in-chief of Perniagaan and former Djawa Tengah editor Tjondrokoesoemo launched a competing daily called Asia.

A noteworthy feature of his tenure at the paper were his articles about birth control, almost unheard of in the Malay press at the time, and which he later published as a book. Chan was also active in the Partai Tionghoa Indonesia, a political party, and founded its Semarang chapter in 1932.

Around 1930 the journalist and historian Liem Thian Joe, who had previously been editor of Warna Warta and Perniagaan, joined the editorial staff of the paper of Djawa Tengah. He published a serialized version of his history of Semarang, Riwajat Semarang 1416–1931 in Djawa Tengah Review, the paper's newly launched monthly magazine, between March 1931 and July 1933.

=== Pouw Kioe An ===
In 1936 Chan Kok Cheng announced he was leaving Djawa Tengah to become editor-in-chief of a competing paper, Soeara Semarang (Malay: voice of Semarang). Although some business listings still listed him as the editor-in-chief of Djawa Tengah until late 1937, it appears that his duties were taken over by another editor called Pouw Kioe An. Pouw had been editor of other Semarang newspapers dating back to at least the mid-1920s, including Kamadjoean and Pewarta, with a special focus in sports journalism.

It is unclear exactly when Djawa Tengah ceased publication and why. Due to it no longer being mentioned by 1938 it may have closed by then.
