= 1918 Kudus riot =

The 1918 Kudus riot was an anti-Chinese riot that took place in the city of Kudus, Semarang Regency, Dutch East Indies, on October 31, 1918. In the riot, Javanese townspeople burned and looted the Chinese district, resulting in roughly 10 deaths and dozens of injuries, and causing half of the Chinese population of the city to flee to Semarang and other cities in Java.

== Context ==
The riot in Kudus was not an isolated incident, but happened in a context of anti-colonial resistance in the Dutch East Indies by organizations such as the Sarekat Islam, the rise of Chinese nationalism, rapid social change, and a breakdown of the traditional relationship between the Chinese Indonesians and the Javanese population. As the Chinese in the Indies often acted as middlemen between the Indonesians and the Dutch, they were also vulnerable to attacks and bullying which were aimed at the colonial economy or social injustice.

An Indonesian historian who wrote a thesis about the Kudus riot, Masyhuri, stated that the immediate factors that contributed to the riot were the particularly strong religious attitude of Muslims in Kudus, and the rise of far left radicalism which he believes primed the Muslim townspeople for radical action. He notes that most Dutch sources blamed the Sarekat Islam, which he rejected as an oversimplification that may have come from their dislike of that organization. On the other hand, The Siauw Giap, who wrote a 1966 article on the Kudus riot, believed that there were systematic preconditions for anti-Chinese violence in Indonesian history which could spill over when conditions were right. In this case he partly blamed the very recent economic competition in the kretek cigarette industry between Chinese and Indonesian owners for the breakdown in relations in Kudus.

The incident that precipitated the riot itself happened the day before. In late October 1918, the Kudus Chinese community had been holding ritual processions through the city to honour a folk religious figure Tua Pek Kong in the hopes of warding off the Influenza epidemic ravaging the city. On October 30, one of these processions where participants were wearing costumes of Arabs, Africans, Chinese kings, and so on, came face to face with Javanese townspeople who were repairing the Menara Kudus Mosque. The sight of the mock Hadji and Arab costumes angered some of the Muslims who were there. The procession ground to a halt as wagons going in two opposite directions refused to make way; it turned into a brawl that was broken up by the police.

== Events of October 31 ==
On the morning of October 31 a meeting was called at the office of the Kudus Sarekat Islam with the participation of the police superintendent, the Chinese Officer of Kudus, and others, to calm tensions over the brawl. But at the same time, some people (who may or may not have been connected to the Sarekat Islam) were going around the nearby Javanese towns and districts, calling people to meet at the mosque tower at 6 pm.

The police set up checkpoints in Kudus, but as nothing had happened by 8 pm, many of their officers headed home. It was at that point that about 80 Javanese townspeople walked into the Chinese district and started trying to break down doors, while a crowd watched from a distance. The police were still on site but were too few to stop the emerging riot. So the number of riots grew to a much larger number, possible 2000 people, and started burning down houses and businesses in the Chinese district. At this point the Resident of Kudus called to the Regent of Semarang Regency to ask for military assistance.

What happened later in the night is disputed. According to the historian Masyhuri, by 10:30 pm many of the original rioters started to leave, carrying off valuables with them, and some of those who remained started to help the victims. On the other hand, the Semarang newspaper Djawa Tengah said that the rioters suddenly turned and battled the police at around this time, with many wounded, including one who later died in the hospital. Masyhuri emphasized that the Kudus Chinese did not attempt to resist the riot, and many hid in their homes and fled with nothing when those were being destroyed. The riot finally ended in the early hours of the morning of November 1 as the troops arrived from Semarang.

== Aftermath ==
The immediate consequence of the riot was the flight of nearly half the Chinese population of Kudus (roughly two out of four thousand) to Semarang and other cities. Newspapers on the following day reported the sight of the morning train arriving in Semarang with all 8 train cars completely full of Chinese families from Kudus. The Dutch language newspaper De Locomotief from Semarang reported on that day that 9 Chinese people had been confirmed dead, 7 of whom died in fires, and that the number of dead on the Javanese side had not been released. By November 1, the Dutch colonial police raided Javanese towns in and around Kudus and, after 3 weeks had arrested an estimated 159 people. The Sarekat Islam denounced these arrests as indiscriminate and arbitrary, as many townspeople were arrested after the fact with little evidence. They denied their organization's involvement in the riot and accused the Dutch of targeting their Kudus membership for political reasons in the middle of the mass arrests.

The Chinese community of the Dutch East Indies, which was wealthy but did not have political power, organized to support the Kudus victims who they felt had been abandoned by the Dutch authorities. Some early fundraising happened in Semarang as labor organizations and merchants coordinated housing and supplies for the displaced Kudus Chinese. It was in an Indies-wide meeting on November 16 that a formal organization was set up to coordinate the relief efforts, so that local organizations around the Indies could send money to single central committee.

== Trial ==
A mass trial was held for those arrested after the Kudus riot. It took place at the courthouse (Landraad) in Semarang and was a front-page news story in many local newspapers on a daily basis from December 1919 to February 1920. The final sentencing took place on February 25, 1920, where a significant number of the arrested were sentenced to 3 to 5 years in prison, although some were released due to lack of evidence.

== Cultural references ==
The journalist and novelist Tan Boen Kim wrote a fictionalized account of the Kudus riot, which he published in 1920, called Riot in Kudus: A true story which happened in Central Java not long ago.
