= Lie On Moy =

Dutch East Indies woman journalist

Lie On Moy (1884–1951) was a Peranakan Chinese journalist, writer and translator in the Dutch East Indies. She is thought to have been one of the first Peranakan women journalists and published writers in the Indies.

== Biography ==
Lie On Moy was born in Padang, Sumatra, Dutch East Indies (now Indonesia) in 1884. Her family were Hakka who had recently immigrated from China to Padang. Her younger brother Lie In Eng also became a well-known translator and journalist. Her education is not well documented, but she is known to have been literate in Chinese and Malay.

At around the turn of the century, she moved to the colonial capital Batavia and married Lauw Giok Lan, who would eventually become one of the best known Chinese Indonesian journalists. They had at least one child, Lauw Soei Goan. Lie became a prolific translator of Chinese stories into Malay, which were then serialized in newspapers; she may have sometimes published these under pseudonyms such as Hemeling. At this time it was still quite rare for Indies Chinese or Native women to write and publish under their own names; Letters of a Javanese Princess by Kartini, the most famous such publication, was only posthumously published in 1911. Other Peranakan Chinese women journalists and translators such as Siem Piet Nio, Lie Loan Lian Nio, and Nyonya The Tiang Ek were not active until the 1920s.

In 1913 Lie, along with her husband Lauw Giok Lan, Tjoe Bou San and Song Chong Soei, founded a weekly publication in Batavia called Penghiboer ("Entertainer"), although it does not seem to have lasted long.

Her life or writing career after the 1910s are not well documented. As Indies society was very conservative during this era, with few public roles for Chinese or Native Indonesian women, it is possible she continued to translate or under pseudonyms. She died in 1951.
