= Put On (comics) =

Put On is a comic by Chinese Indonesian cartoonist Kho Wan Gie, published in the Dutch East Indies and later in independent Indonesia. It began its run in Sin Po in 1931 and was published twice weekly, every Friday and Saturday, in Malay —the language of its publication. Kho ended the comic in 1965 as anti-Chinese actions by the Indonesian government increased.

== Characters ==
- Put On
  - Kho used the Bringing up Father character Jiggs as his inspiration for the titular character. Agus Dernawan T. of The Jakarta Post described the character as a "helpful, empathic", " humorous and candid young man who often faced swee-siao (mishaps)." Put On is patriotic for Indonesia despite anti-Chinese sentiment, and he socializes with all ethnic groups in the country.
  - Kho said that he derived the character's name from English words as a desire for middle class Chinese Indonesians making "Put On" a favored newspaper comic. There was a perception from the public that the name had Hokkien origins.
- A Kong - He had immigrated to Indonesia
- A Liuk - He had immigrated to Indonesia
- Dortji - The girlfriend of Put On, she has Chinese ethnicity but has adopted the culture of the Netherlands, which had colonized Indonesia at the time.
- On Tek - A friend of Put On
- Si Peng - Put On's younger brother
- Si Tong - Put On's younger brother
- Nee - The main character's mother
