= Tjahaja Timoer =

Malay-language Peranakan newspaper

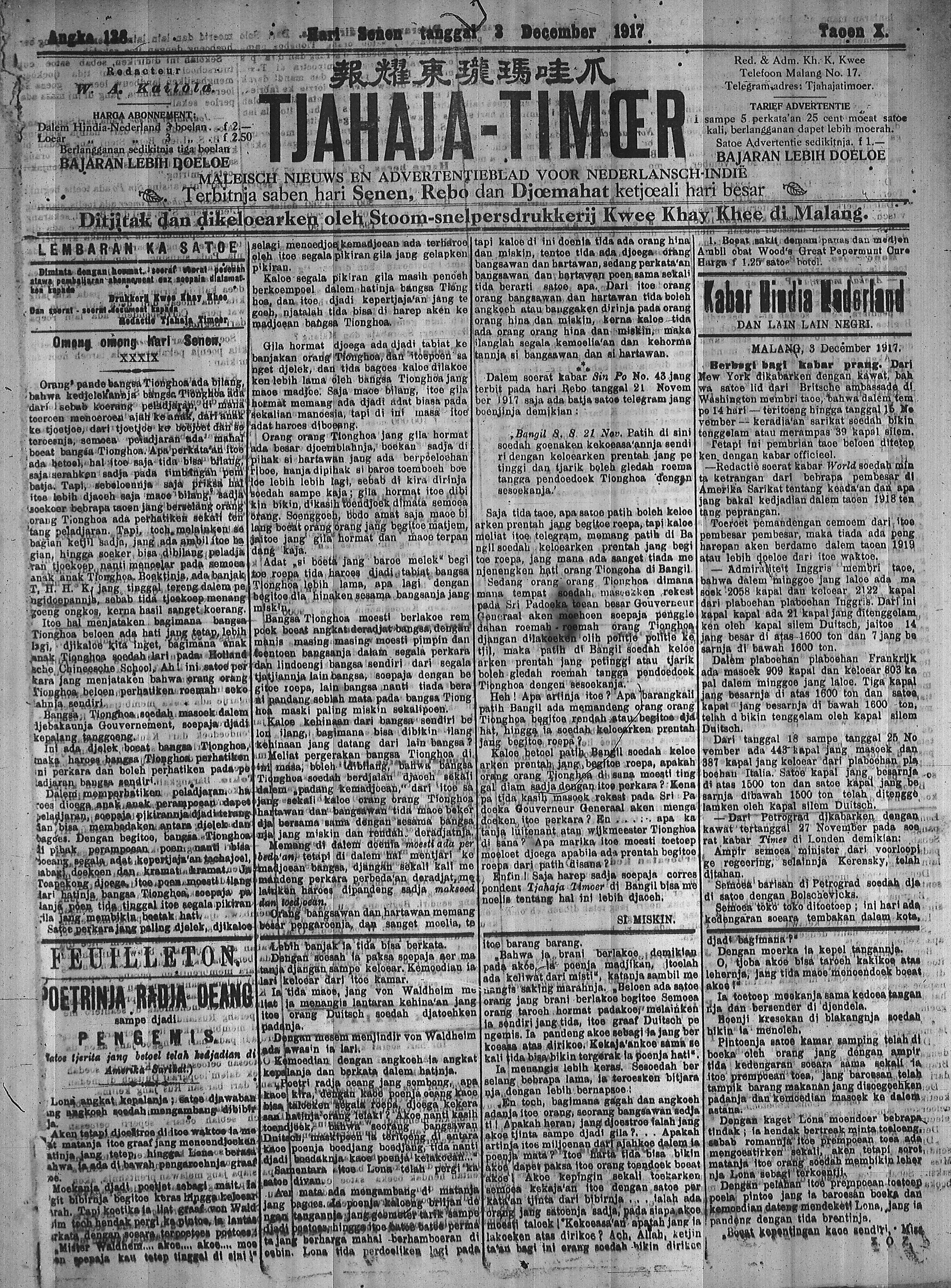
The front page of Tjahaja Timoer, December 3rd, 1917

Tjahaja Timoer (Indonesian: Light of the East, EYD: Cahaya Timur) was a Malay-language Peranakan newspaper printed in Malang, Dutch East Indies, from 1907 to 1942.

== History ==
Tjahaja Timoer was founded in January 1907 in Malang, at around the same time as its more famous counterpart Medan Prijaji, with funding from a Peranakan Chinese firm, Sneepers dan Stendrukkkerij Kwee, or Kwee Khaij Khee as it was called in the pages of the newspaper. In its early years it was a supporter of Theosophy, then popular among elites in the Indies.

Despite its Chinese ownership, by the 1910s the paper was noted to be very sympathetic to the Indische Party. Before long it was also expressing sympathy for the Sarekat Islam, an anti-colonial mass organisation. This was due to the influence of its editor, Raden Djojosoediro, who supported both movements. By 1914, while still editor of the paper, Djojosoerdiro even joined the central committee of the Sarekat Islam.

In 1916 W.A. Kailola, former editor of Perniagaan, a conservative Chinese newspaper from Batavia, became the editor of Tjahaja Timoer.

In 1922 the owners of Tjahaja Timoer entered into a business deal with the Soerabaijasch Handelsblad to allow their printing presses to be used to print a new Dutch language newspaper in Malang, De Oosthoekbode, with journalist Brunsveldt van Hulten as its new editor. This was apparently done in a move against Jahn's Advertentieblad, a newspaper which had a monopoly in the city. Not long after it began to be printed, this new paper (the Oosthoekbode) started to circulate (via the national wire service ANETA) allegations against a former editor of Tjahaja Timoer. It alleged that this former editor, Andanjomo, in collaboration with Sarekat Islam leader Mohamed Joenoes, was terrorizing the populace of Malang and forcing native servants into a clandestine organization called Sarikat Brontak (Indonesian: Resistance Union). It is unclear whether this allegation was factual because this organization was not mentioned subsequently.

Tjahaja Timoer continued to publish in Malang until the Japanese occupation of the Dutch East Indies in 1942.
