= Censorship in the Dutch East Indies =

Censorship in the Dutch East Indies was significantly stricter than in the Netherlands, as the freedom of the press guaranteed in the Constitution of the Netherlands did not apply in the country's overseas colonies. Before the twentieth century, official censorship focused mainly on Dutch-language materials, aiming at protecting the trade and business interests of the colony and the reputation of colonial officials. In the early twentieth century, with the rise of Indonesian nationalism, censorship also encompassed materials printed in local languages such as Malay and Javanese, and enacted a repressive system of arrests, surveillance and deportations to combat anti-colonial sentiment.

== History ==
=== Dutch East India Company rule (1600s–1799) ===
Although the Dutch started to establish a presence in Southeast Asia at the turn of the seventeenth century, there was no functioning European printing press in their settlements there for several decades, and the first government bulletins were handwritten circulars. The Dutch East India Company contracted the first European bookbinder in the Indies, Hendrick Brandt, in Batavia in 1668. The first Indies censor Peter Pauw was appointed that same year to read and approve any materials printed by that press, and the others which were founded in the following years. Although the rules were not as clearly codified as in later eras, they operated under the principle of preventive censorship. Under the authority of the Governor General, materials deemed unsuitable for publication could be held back and printers could be imprisoned or deported. The East India Company did have a veto on such cases but rarely involved itself. Pauw's duties were taken over in 1692 by Abraham van Riebeek. After contracting with various private printers in Batavia over the next decades, authorities finally established a government printing house in the Batavia Castle in 1712.

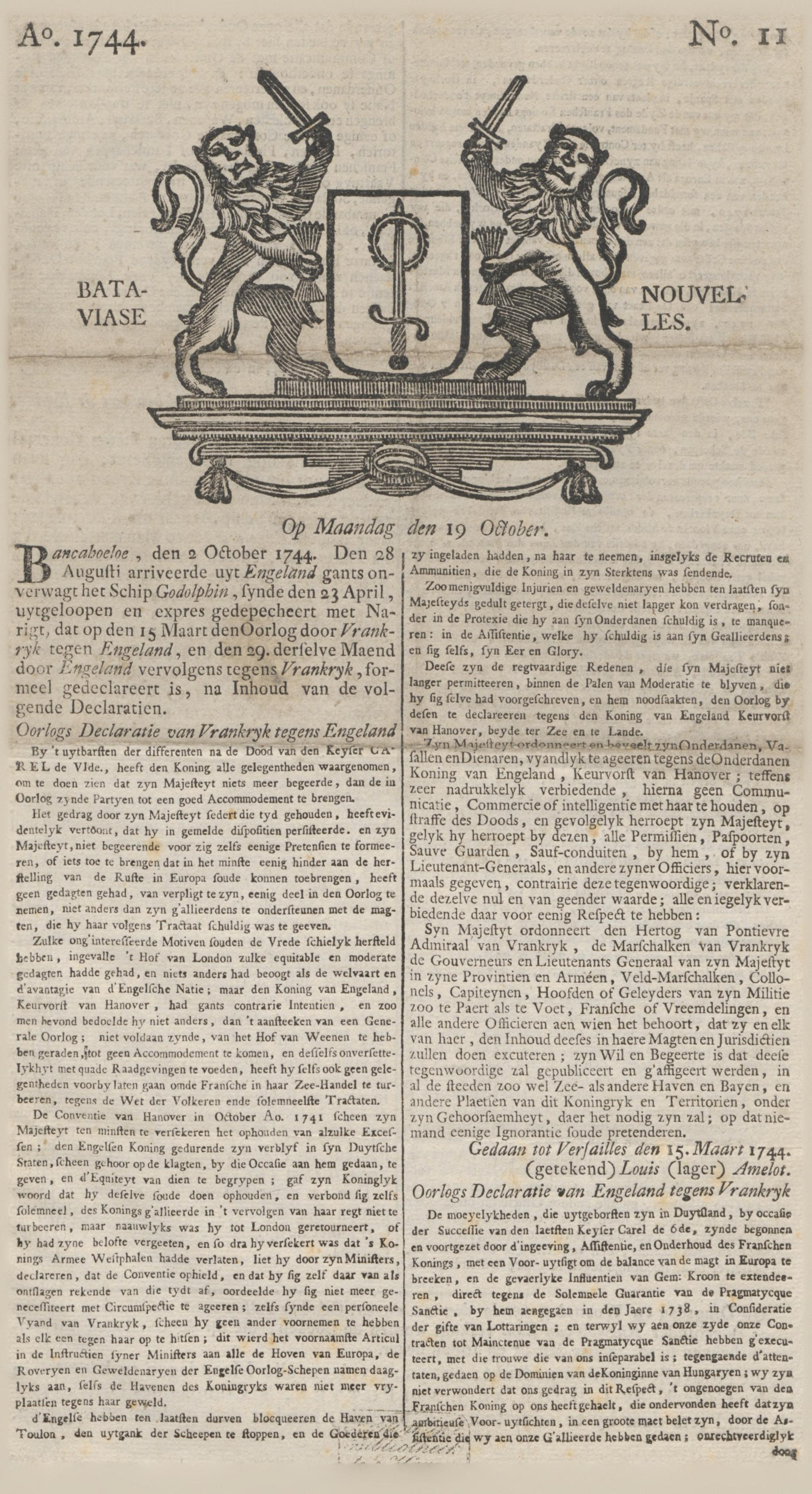
Cover page of Bataviase Nouvelles, 19 October 1744

The first newspaper in the Indies was the short-lived Bataviase Nouvelles (1744–6); being printed in Dutch, which was understood by only a tiny minority in the Indies, it did not have a wide distribution. Its content consisted mainly of government bulletins, auction news, and advertisements. However, as the Dutch East India Company became afraid that such a paper would reveal trade secrets to other European powers in Asia, its three-year contract was not renewed in 1746 and it was forced to close. The only other independent newspaper to appear in the Indies in this era was the Vendu Nieuws which appeared in 1776. Published in Batavia, it only covered auctions and other business bulletins; nonetheless, it was closely scrutinized by censors.

Christian printed materials in the Indies were also subject to censorship by the Dutch Reformed Church. However, very little religious material was printed in the Indies during this era, due to the lack of printing capacity and skilled workforce.

=== French and British interregnum (1799–1816) ===
After the Dutch East India Company defaulted in 1799, the colony was taken over directly by the Dutch crown. However, starting in 1806, the colony was occupied by France and then Britain during a period called the French and British interregnum in the Dutch East Indies. Herman Willem Daendels was appointed Governor General of the Indies by Napoleon in 1807. He purchased the City Printing House in Batavia and merged it with the Castle Printing House to form a new government printer, the Landsdrukkerij, and began to publish a new government bulletin after 1810 (the Bataviasche Koloniale Courant). He seems to have continued to organize the small printing industry in Batavia according to the principle of preventive censorship. Vendu Nieuws, which was still being published in the Castle Printing House, shut down during the transfer of assets to the new administration, as its functions were assumed by the Courant. However, that publication only lasted until August 1811, when the British conquered Java.

During the period of British rule over the Indies, printing house was taken over by W. Hunter, who had additional equipment and workers brought from Bengal. In February 1812 a new English-language government publication was created, the Java Government Gazette. That publication had a very different tone from the Dutch ones that had preceded it; it included commentary about politics, Indies folklore, and humour on top of the usual business news.

=== Dutch control and development of colony (1817–55) ===
When the Dutch took control in the Indies again in 1817 they continued to operate the Government Printing Office Landsdrukkerij in Batavia and launched an official publication, the Bataviasche Courant (called the Javasche Courant after 1828). This new publication included submissions from readers as well as government and business news. The Dutch resumed their censorship of printed works; because the industry and press were still so small, it did not require specialized legislation.

As the colonial economy developed, and the civil service was greatly expanded, the European population in the Indies became much larger and more literate. At first, short-lived independent newspapers started to appear in Batavia, including the Bataviaasch Advertentieblad (1825) and the Nederlandsch-Indisch Handelsblad (1829). The Java War against Diponegoro took place during this time. It was not until the 1840s and 1850s that longer-lasting papers began to establish themselves, such as another paper named the Bataviaasch Advertentieblad which launched in 1851 and became De Java-bode after 1852; Soerabaja Courant which appeared in Surabaya in 1831; and the Samarangsch Handelsblad in Semarang in 1845 (known as De Locomotief after 1852). Nonetheless, where previous newspapers in the Indies had been limited to simply trade and civil service notices with a handful of reader submissions, this new generation of papers covered European and Indies news. This was made easier with the introduction of the telegraph in 1856 and modern postal service to the Indies in 1869.

An 1844 rule prohibiting the printing of any government materials, even benign ones, by independent printers put yet another burden on these publications. The journal Tijdschrift voor Nederlandsch-Indie, published at the government printing house, was one publication targeted by that rule; its editor W. R. van Hoëvell tried to get around censors and publish honest criticisms of abuses in the colonial system and was faced with repeated censorship and threats of criminal sanctions. In 1848 he was elected to Dutch parliament and returned to the Netherlands.

Roughly a dozen newspapers and journals appeared in Java during this period. These publications were generally only read by Europeans, not Indonesians, who were excluded from European schools and who could generally not read Dutch.

=== Rise of newspapers and press regulations (1856–1905) ===
This rise in the number and complexity of newspapers and the printing industry in the Indies led to the development of a more codified set of press censorship regulations in the early 1850s. The first draft of these regulations was written in October 1851, with debates in Dutch parliament and a Royal Proclamation in April 1852 and further debates in 1853 and 1854. It came in force by decree of the Governor General of the Indies on 10 November 1856 as the Regulation on Printed Matter in the Netherlands Indies (Dutch: Reglement op de Drukwerken in Nederlandsch-Indië, often abbreviated as Printing Press Regulations Dutch: Drukpersreglement). Further ordinances relating to press freedoms were added in 1858. The penalties for these Press Offences (Persdelict) were quite strict; anyone operating a printing press had to register with authorities, pay deposits, and provide copies to censors before publication; in case of severe violations the press could be shut down by censors before a printed item reached the public, with fines of up to 500 guilders or three years in prison. Many of these rules had been enforced before but were now made more explicit.

Portrait of Johan Rudolf Thorbecke

The main worry of policymakers and censors was the European press in the Indies, since there was not yet a vernacular-language newspaper industry. They worried that an aggressive press in the colony could undermine the government with criticism of the Aceh War, the opium monopoly, or defamation of local officials (which could include mere reporting on abuses or corruption); the interests of public order and the state were considered to be above free speech. In the Netherlands, which generally enjoyed freedom of the press guaranteed by the Constitution of the Netherlands, some critics saw the strict censorship in the Indies as regressive and contrary to liberal ideals; opposition leader Johan Rudolph Thorbecke, who had lost his campaign to extend press freedom to the Indies, called it "the work of darkness" (het gewrocht der duisternis). Other restrictive measures were codified in the 1850s; an 1854 constitutional regulation denied the right of freedom of association or assembly in the Indies, rights which would not be granted until after World War I.

Authorities faced challenges in implementing these regulations on daily newspapers as they became more numerous; a court decision in 1869 removed the obligation of newspapers to submit copies to censors after a long dispute with De Soerabaja Courant. Nonetheless, by the 1870s and 1880s, the editors most of the major Dutch-language newspapers in Java had faced criminal charges, with some being imprisoned for as long as a year, had their offices closed by force, or were deported; in lesser cases many spent a month in prison or paid fines. For example, in 1879 an editor of De Locomotief in Semarang was jailed for six months for criticizing the Governor General; another editor of the paper was deported in 1881 for printing an article deemed libelous to a local Sultan. The punishment could fall upon various people depending on who could be identified as responsible: the writer, then the editor, then the publisher, and finally the printer and distributor if none of the others could be identified or tried. Some of the jailed editors could have avoided their sentence by giving up the name of anonymous contributors who they had printed, but due to their journalistic ethics none of them ever did so. Some printing houses were forced to close permanently under these regulations, as in the case of Jonas Portier & Co. in Surakarta whose press was closed after their newspaper De Vorstenlanden went too far in criticizing the government. In other cases journalists were also arrested over penal code violations that predated the censorship regulations; the Governor General also made use of his "extraordinary rights" (exorbitante rechten) to deport disruptive individuals from the colony.

In contrast the editors of vernacular language newspapers (printed in Javanese or Malay) were not often arrested or charged in the first twenty years after the press law was passed, partly because they were more cautious about what they printed, and partly because their content was not always understood by Dutch censors. The editors of these papers were generally not native Indonesians, but Europeans or Indo people who had European status and education. These newspapers were sometimes affected by the legal closure of Dutch newspapers' printing presses if they shared equipment with them. By the 1870s some of them did start to be targeted directly with Press Offenses. On the other hand, Dutch-language materials published in the Netherlands itself were generally exempt from censorship even if they were exported to the Indies, although "discretion" was still expected of importers. An 1893 royal decree also allowed for the confiscation and censorship of open mail and documents received by the Indies postal service.

The colonial printing house (Landsdrukkerij) in Batavia, c.1880s

As the printing press economy diversified and included more and more non-Europeans, the regulations were amended. In 1900, the law was amended to allow the Governor General to block any printed matter from importation into the Indies. Punishments for importing banned matter were up to six months in prison for Europeans and up to six months of hard labour for native Indonesians. Also in 1900, press regulations were amended to explicitly include native Indonesians and so-called "foreign Orientals" (Dutch: Vreemde Oosterlingen, referring mostly to Chinese Indonesians and Arab Indonesians); both of these groups had distinct legal status from Europeans, were tried in different courts, and could expect a different level of punishment for the same crime. Because of that, Chinese-owned newspapers in this era often tried to hire European or Indo editors to reduce the legal risk to their operations; a famous example is J. R. Razoux Kühr who was editor of Sin Po in 1912.

A 1905 law also forbade newspapers from covering troop or military ship movements in the Indies; it remained in force for the following decades.

=== Revision of regulations and prewar period (1906–13) ===
As a result of the modernization of the economy in the early twentieth century, and social trends such as the Dutch Ethical Policy, printing press regulations were also updated by royal decree in 1906. Many of the strictest rules from the 1856 regulations were no longer being enforced by this time. In the revised regulations, some of the more onerous provisions were removed, including the need to give a copy of any printed material to censors before it was distributed; it was amended to say it must be given to authorities within 24 hours of publication. (Even that requirement was not really enforceable as the number of publications proliferated.) The need for each printed work to have the name and address of the responsible editor were also added. This was generally interpreted by Dutch liberals as an extension of freedom of the press to the Indies, although in fact arrests and detentions of journalists continued with the introduction of new government strategies and subsequent laws.

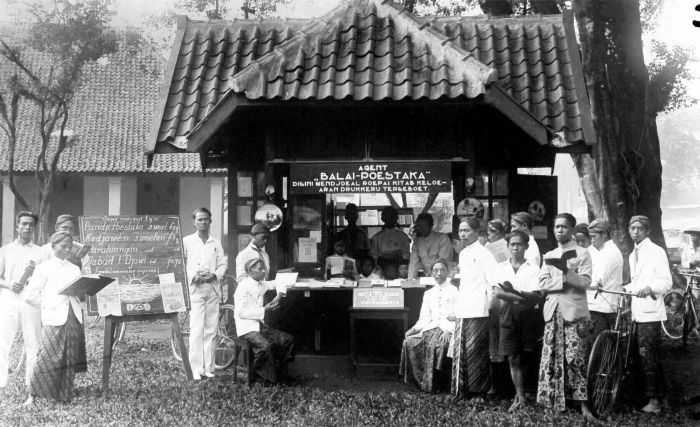
A kiosk of Balai Pustaka materials in Purwokerto, early 20th C.

In 1908 the government created an organization for vernacular-language literature which would spearhead official publishing in non-European languages for the following decades; it was called the Commission for Native Schools and Popular Literature (Balai Pustaka in Malay or Commissie voor Volkslectuur in Dutch). It was modeled after the World Library (Wereldbibliotheek), an educational press founded in the Netherlands in 1905. Balai Pustaka aimed to promote reading materials for European-style schools for native Indonesians as well as for public libraries, with only government-approved works aimed at "improving" the population and steering them away from nationalistic or dangerous reading materials. Balai Pustaka also translated a number of European classic works of literature into Malay and other languages. Balai Pustaka did gain quite a large market share, although Malay-language works published by independent Chinese Indonesian presses still outsold them overall. This approach was also taken with vernacular-language newspapers by other arms of the colonial government than Balai Pustaka; for the following decade subsidies were given to sympathetic or "reasonable" native newspaper publishers, as in the case of Neratja, while punishment and censorship was used against unfriendly ones. Likewise the government began to study the notion of setting up a government press bureau to send out "trusted" news stories as a way to have some control over what was being printed.

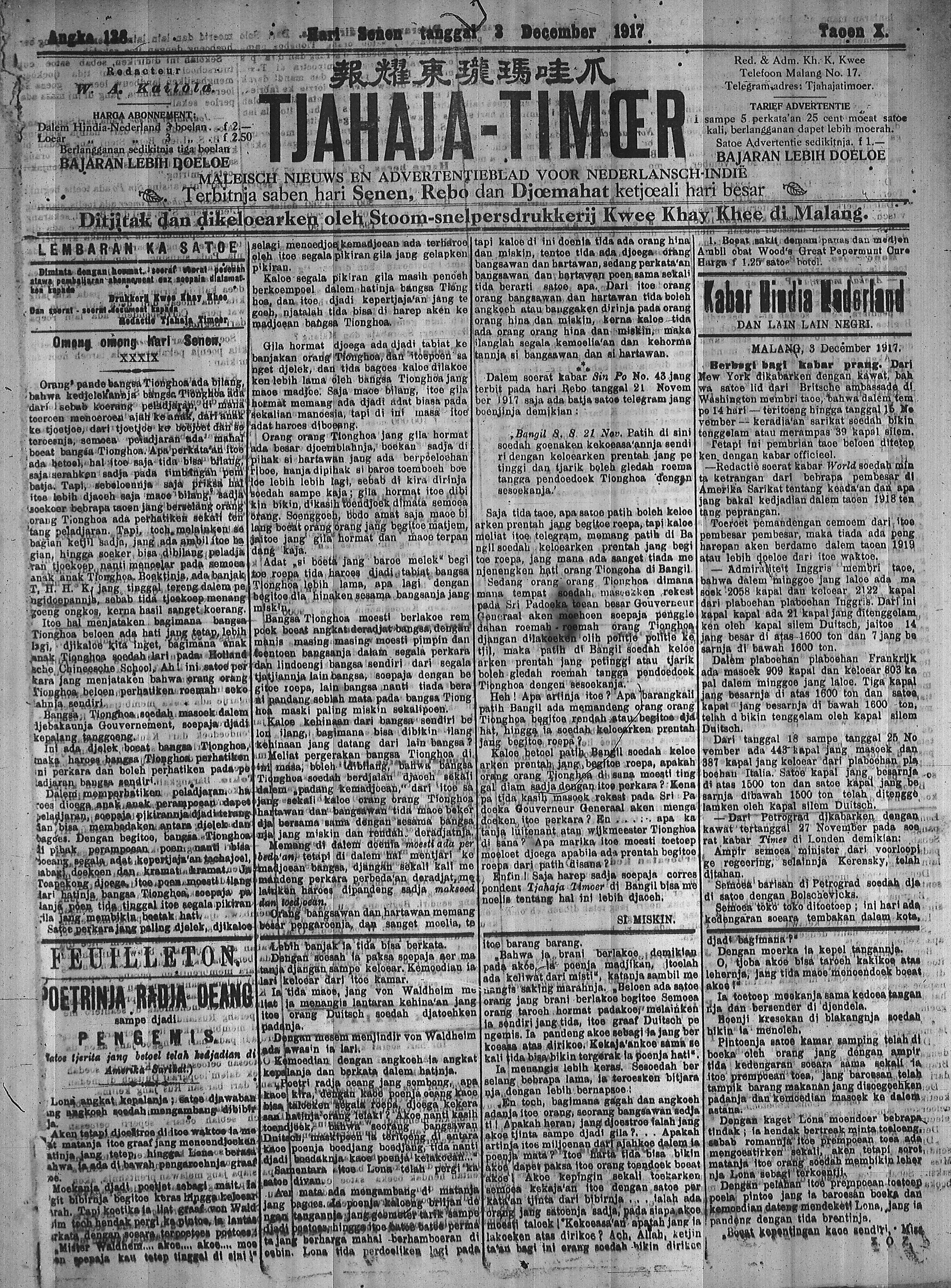
A 1917 issue of Tjahaja Timoer

During this period the number of independent vernacular language newspapers also increased greatly, from around 8 in 1890 to 36 in 1910, with a rapid increase in circulation as well. Most well known among these new papers was Medan Prijaji, founded in 1907 by Tirto Adhi Soerjo, considered the father of Indonesian journalism. The number of newspapers published in Malay by Chinese Indonesians grew rapidly as well, from only one in Java in 1905 to fifteen in 1911; these included Sin Po in Batavia and Tjahaja Timoer in Malang. Many of these newspapers were quite vocal in their criticism of the colonial order and of abuses by local officials, and they began to attract censorship and criminal prosecutions. When Governor General J. B. van Heutsz was replaced by Alexander Idenburg in 1909, repression increased and papers such as Medan Prijaji were targeted; the editor was exiled for two months and many advertisers abandoned the paper, forcing it to close in August 1912. Censorship became so endemic that some commentators said the public did not have a clear idea of the social disorder spreading throughout Java unless they read the press from Singapore or Penang. In 1913 Tirto Adhi Soerjo was exiled once again, this time to Ambon, only returning to Java in 1915 and giving up on journalism.

In 1914 the government also passed revisions to the Penal Code which related to press censorship. Among these were regulations banning the printing of any texts or images which might arouse hatred or agitation against the colonial government or of groups among the population. These are often called the "Hate-sowing" articles (called in Dutch the Haatzaai artikelen). These regulations, inspired by the 1910 British India Press Act, were quite broad, and carried potential sentences of five to ten years of hard labour for native Indonesians (with lesser sentences for Europeans, who were rarely targeted with these regulations anyhow). The result was that, before long, all journalists in the Indies knew these regulations quite well and censored themselves to avoid their harsh penalties. Parada Harahap, a journalist who would later be a tycoon of Indonesian journalism, published a Malay translation and guidebook of Press Offense laws and the hate-sowing articles in 1924. In his analysis he lamented the arbitrary nature of the statutes, and the fact that they relied on the subjective interpretation of the sitting judge or prosecutor as to what printed materials were incendiary or hateful. He also noted that the punishments sometimes came after a number of mild infractions had been printed, meaning that editors could not necessarily predict whether a given piece of writing would cause legal troubles or not.

=== World War I (1914–18) ===
The period of World War I in the Indies was one of increasing social instability and a rising anti-colonial movement led by the Sarekat Islam and other groups. Every new political party and mass organization launched its own newspaper, and these became the focus of extreme scrutiny by colonial authorities, who regularly jailed their editors over press offenses for printing materials critical of the state or its representatives. The outbreak of the war also severely disrupted the Indies administration, as it became quite isolated from Europe and was forced to work hard to maintain its neutrality between England and Germany. Shipments of mail were often confiscated by Germany, and mail and telegraph lines were delayed or censored by the British as well. Gradually, Indies newspapers were forced to rely only on news which had been provided (and censored) by the British, meaning that news of Europe was often quite limited portrayed Germans in a negative light. To keep the appearance of neutrality, the Indies censors began to ban anything which appeared too pro-British or pro-French, including the playing of films, propaganda newsreels or military marches associated with those countries.

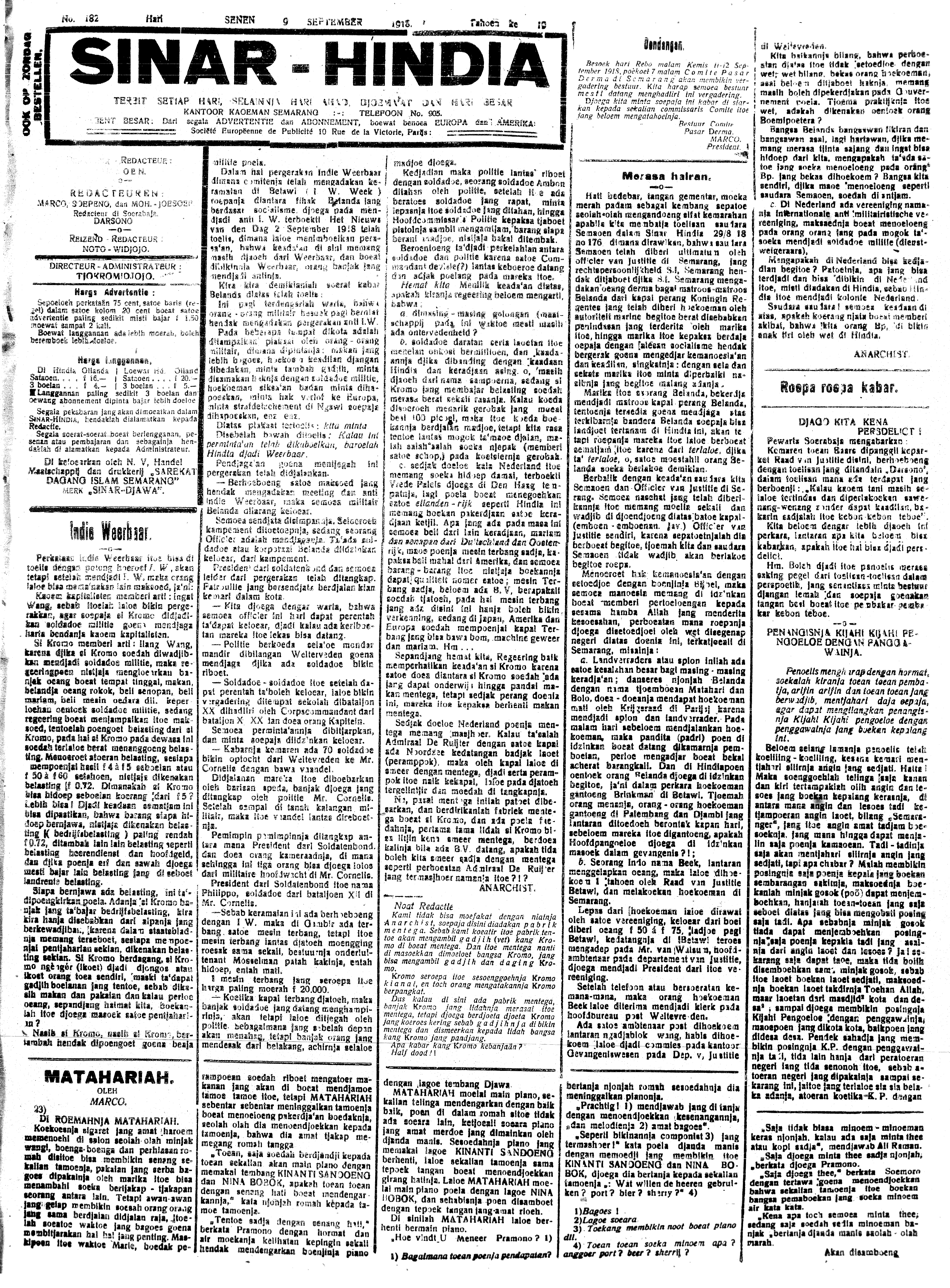
Sinar Hindia issue from September 1918

Governor General van Limburg Stirum, an aristocratic liberal who took office in 1916, wanted the censorship laws to become even stricter. He thought the current regulations and monitoring were not tough enough, and called for licenses for journalists, new criminal offenses, and temporary suspension of publishing rights for "offending" publishers. In the end, a new law was not passed but surveillance and repression of journalists did increase; anti-colonial journalists such as Marco Kartodikromo were repeatedly arrested and jailed for printing content critical of the colonial system, so often that journalists nicknamed jails the "Journalist's hotel". The "hate-sowing articles" of 1914 were often used as the legal pretext to punish native editors who printed articles critical of wartime policy or political repression. These native journalists would often be marched through town in shackles, unlike Dutch editors who would be transported by carriage; complaints by Mas Marco and others led to the abandonment of this practice in 1917. Radical editors learned how to publish articles which criticized the system without technically breaking the law; and when they were arrested and brought before the court they used it as a stage to rally others to their cause. Tjipto Mangoenkoesoemo, a radical intellectual, became a particular target of censors and authorities as he published pamphlets condemning the unjust press laws in the colony.

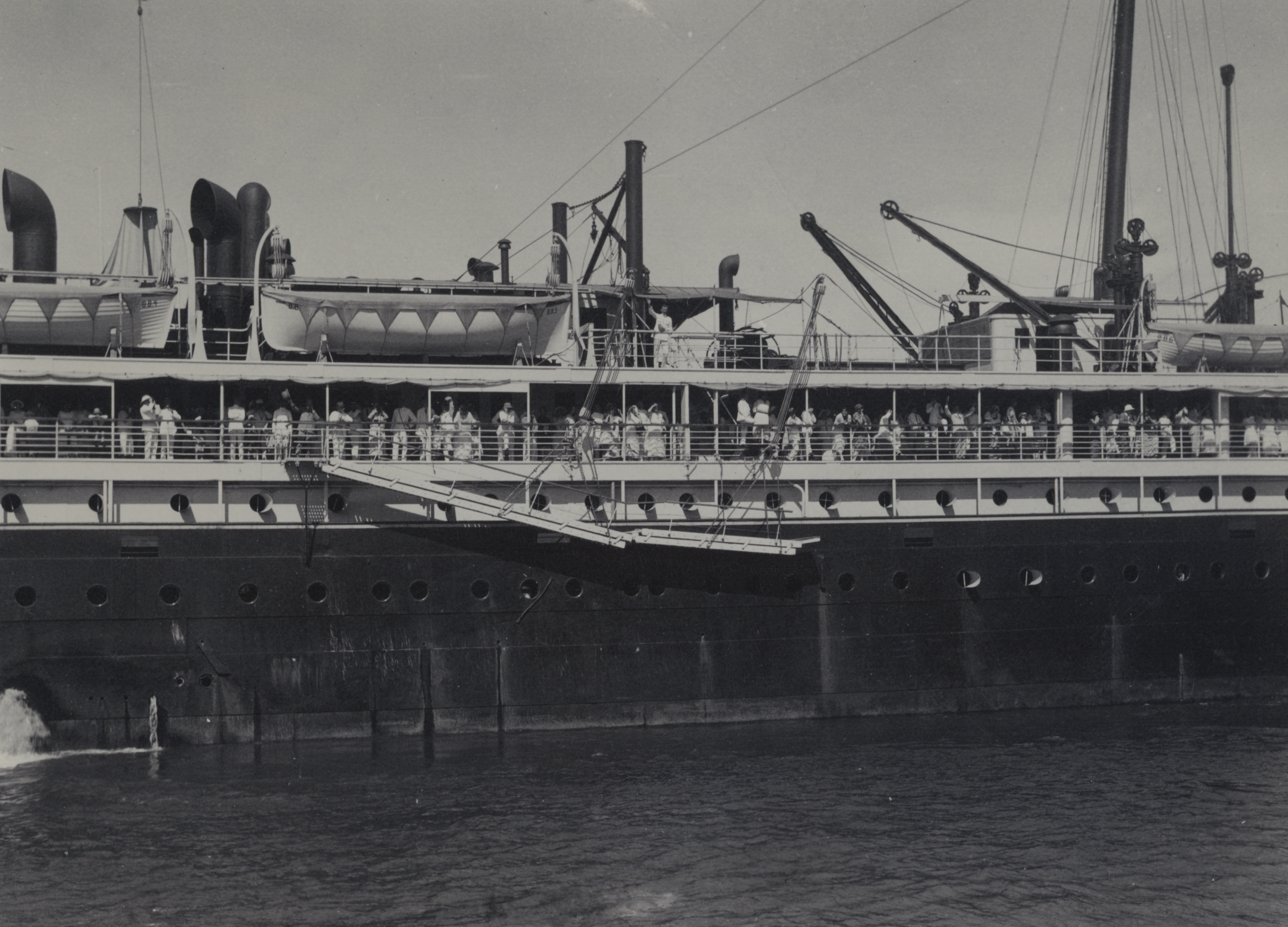
A ship at dock in Batavia, c.1917

Relations between the Netherlands and Britain deteriorated later in the war, and in October 1917 the British completely cut off the Indies from access to telegraph lines. Henceforth the only people in the Indies who could send or receive telegrams were citizens of Allied countries and Japanese citizens. Because of this, European businesses in the Indies entered a deep crisis. The Dutch government finally negotiated a reopening of telegram rights in February 1918, although the British still withheld communications when they felt like it.

Balai Pustaka, the state-supported vernacular language publishing house, also became involved in censorship during the war. In 1917, it began to monitor the native-language press on behalf of authorities, marking a drastic reorientation of its organizational goals; this publication Overzicht van de Inlandsche Pers (Overview of the Native Press) became required reading for colonial civil servants. In this publication, which began as mailed typewritten reports but eventually became higher-quality books in 1921, they began to publish translated reports on what was being printed in all of the major Malay- and Javanese-language newspapers in the Indies. Before long these were being used to identify and target "troublesome" vernacular-language newspapers. Balai Pustaka also launched new magazines such as Sri Poestaka in 1918, Pandji Poestaka in 1923, and the Javanese-language Kedjawen in 1926.

Another change in 1918 was that press offense charges had since 1856 always been tried in the Court of Justice (Raad van Justitie) but could now be heard in local courts. And freedom of assembly and political association were finally legalized in the Indies in 1915, although it did not come into effect until 1919.

=== Interwar period (1918–38) ===
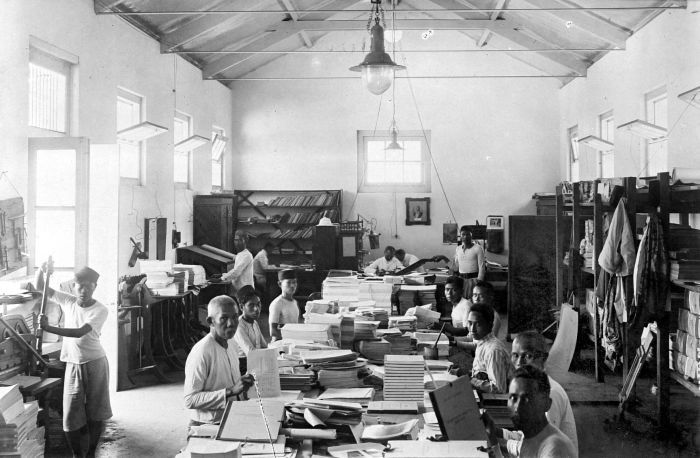
Bookbinding staff in the government printing house (Landsdrukkerij) Batavia, early 20th century

After the end of the war, Dutch officials in the Indies continued to be focused on the rising Indonesian National Awakening and debated whether new stricter censorship should be introduced, or if the penal code would continue to work as intended. Social disruptions and leftist agitation among the European population were also a major concern for censors; the Social Democratic newspaper Het Vrije Woord and some sailors' magazines were temporarily banned in 1918 to prevent uprisings by leftist sailors and soldiers. British censorship of international telegraphs finally ended in July 1919.

The new Governor General Dirk Fock, who took office in 1921, was in favour of keeping the existing regulations and not enacting a stricter regime. However, repression of journalists, nationalists and labour activists continued to intensify; the use of press offenses was often applied in conjunction with the arrests of strike leaders or the banning of freedom of assembly in major cities. Members of the newly-founded Communist Party of Indonesia were a particular target of persecution; their newspapers were repeatedly raided and their editors jailed, and party leaders were regularly arrested for giving speeches aimed at disrupting the colonial system. A 1924 memo which promised to fire any state employee who publicly criticized the government also had the effect of repressing political expression and union membership. The next Governor General, Andries Cornelis Dirk de Graeff, took office in March 1926 and was considered a liberal who might ease tensions with the nationalist movement. However, the communist uprisings in Java that happened that same year caused him to continue the policy of repression and confrontation, and in 1928 he submitted plans for harsher treatment of radical journalists and newspapers.

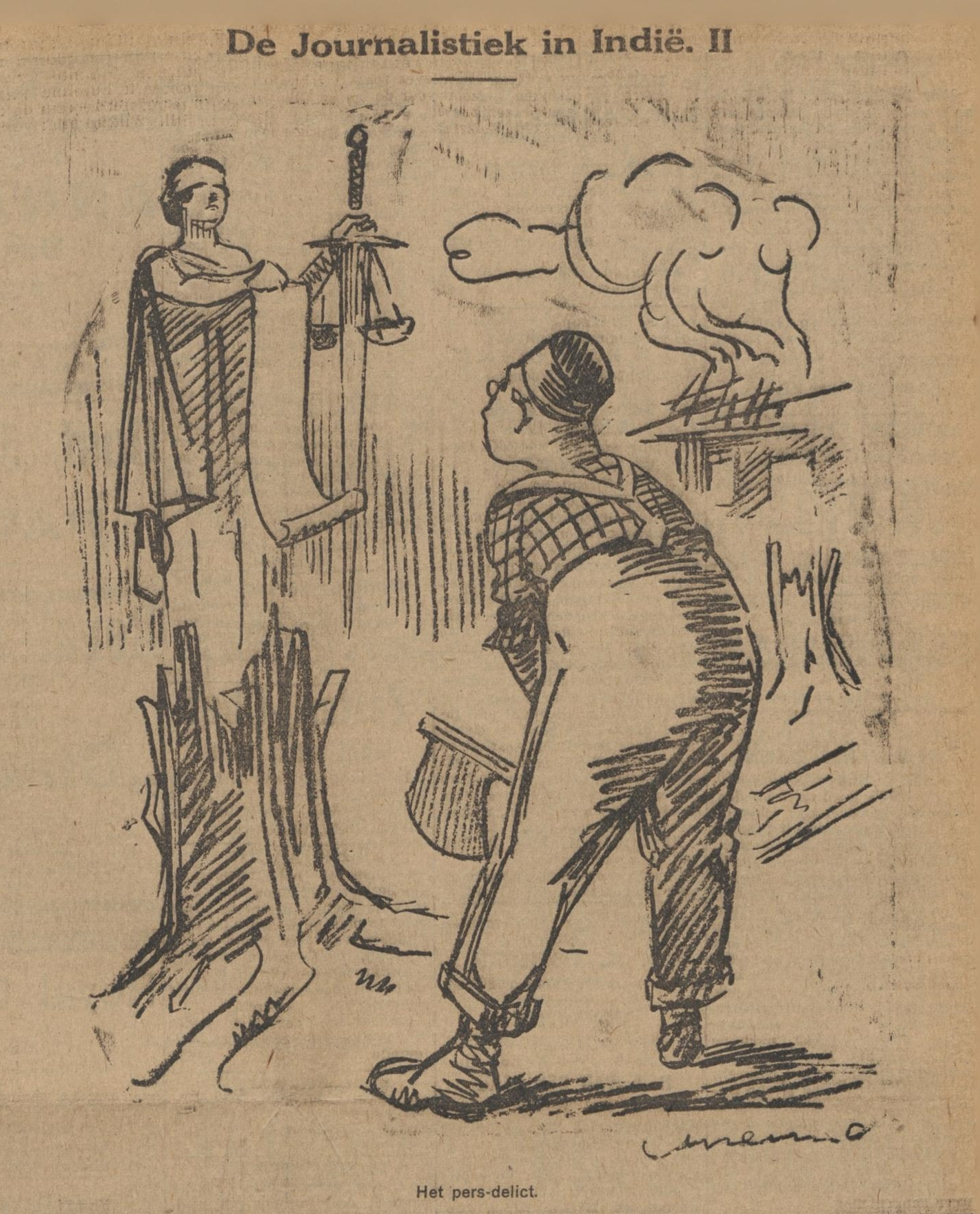
Political cartoon about press censorship, Dutch East Indies, 1922

In the 1930s, censorship and political repression, especially of Indonesians, escalated to the point of operating essentially as a police state, with regular intimidation, extralegal detention, and exile of journalists and intellectuals. Former approaches, such as the press surveillance carried out by Balai Pustaka, were considered to have failed. A new Press Curbing Ordinance (Persbreidelordonnatie) was passed in September 1931 which followed de Graeff's 1928 suggestions and once again gave the Governor General extreme powers to detain, blacklist, censor or imprison editors. The basis for censorship was extended from defamation and other such matters to include subversion and incitement. Therefore Indonesian nationalism became a taboo and many of its leaders were exiled or imprisoned. In the five years after it was passed, around 27 Indonesian nationalist newspapers were shut down, as well as 5 Dutch ones; whereas previous regulations had targeted journalists, these new ones allowed for the shuttering of publications as well. Chinese-owned newspapers were also targeted; the first paper to have been shut down under this law was Warna Warta from Semarang, which was ordered to cease printing for 2 months in 1932 after being accused of printing anti-Japanese content. Even Dutch- and Japanese-owned newspapers were eventually punished under this law, such as Nieuws van den Dag voor Nederlandsch-Indië which was temporarily closed in 1933 for reporting on a mutiny on a Dutch warship, the Zeven Provienciën. The 1931 law also gave the government new tools to ban the importation of almost any foreign materials it found subversive or dangerous. In the 1930s the government gazette De Javasche Courant regularly published lists of books and pamphlets which were banned from the Indies and which were to be turned back by the postal service. A particular focus was communist literature; authorities made use of the regulations several times in the mid-1930s to identify it before it entered the country.

=== World War II (1939–42) ===
With the outbreak of World War II in Europe in September 1939, colonial authorities changed their focus and returned to the World War I-era concern over maintaining official neutrality. Many Chinese Indonesian newspapers regularly printed anti-Japanese content, whereas some European newspapers (such as Het Licht in Sukabumi, West Java) were vocally pro-German.

After the Netherlands was invaded by Nazi Germany in May 1940, in June the Indies put in place new wartime regulations for control and surveillance based on a 1932 statute on censorship for national security reasons. The post, telephone, telegraphs, and travel became highly restricted. In May the government also launched the Regeerings Publiciteits Dienst, a centralized information bureau which had been proposed as far back as 1933. And the government stopped prosecuting newspapers under the 1931 press laws; with its wartime powers it simply shut down newspapers without trial. In other cases it used the 1931 Persbreidel statutes to forbid the printing of anti-French, anti-English or anti-Jewish articles; some pro-German political parties such as the Nationaal-Socialistische Beweging were also banned.

This situation persisted until the Japanese occupation of the Dutch East Indies in April 1942.
