= Hauw Tek Kong =

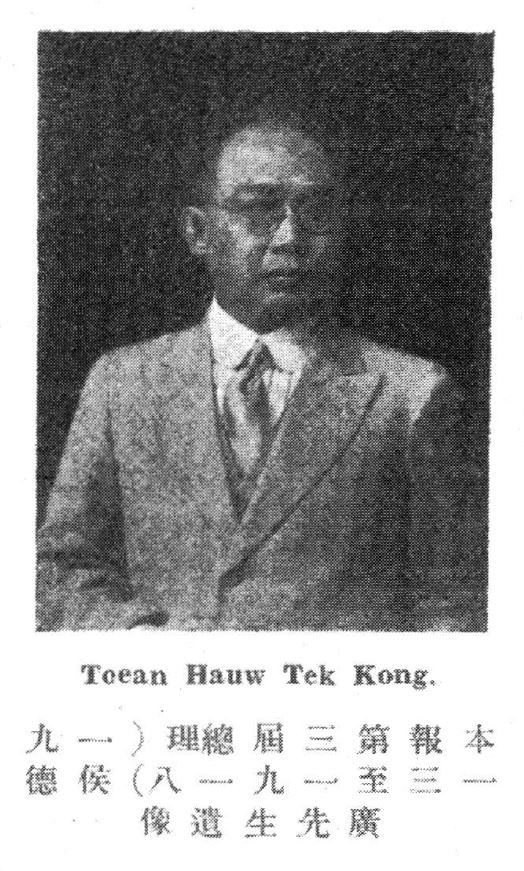
A portrait of Hauw Tek Kong, Chinese Indonesian newspaperman

Hauw Tek Kong (Chinese: 侯德廣) (1887-1928) was a Peranakan Chinese newspaper editor and publisher from the Dutch East Indies associated with Sin Po and later Keng Po.

== Biography ==
Hauw Tek Kong was born in Batavia, Dutch East Indies in 1887. He is thought to have studied at the Anglo-Chinese School in Singapore.

Around 1908 he became interested in silent film theatres and became director of a company aiming to open one in Batavia, the Solar Bioscope Company Ltd.. This company purchased the equipment that same year and toured it around various temporary venues in Batavia and as far afield as Bogor before having a permanent location built for it in Meester Cornelis by 1910. The films shown at the Solar Bioscore included English productions and those produced by Pathé.

=== Sin Po ===
In 1913, when Oey Tjioe Yong, the former director of the popular Indies Chinese newspaper Sin Po stepped down, Hauw, who was already a major shareholder in the paper, was appointed in his place. Under his tenure the paper became embroiled in a high-profile feud with some more conservative elements of the Chinese community due to its criticism of the colonial Chinese Officer system. That feud resulted in calls to boycott Sin Po. In particular the paper harshly attacked Phoa Keng Hek and Khouw Kim An, high-profile Chinese Officers, and accused them of corruption and abuse of authority.

In early 1919, Hauw became embroiled in a court case against J. R. Razoux Kühr, the former editor of Sin Po who was then at rival paper Perniagaan. It is unclear what the substance of the case was.

Hauw also became known as a high-profile opponent to Dutch proposals to grant citizenship or some sort of qualified subjecthood for Indies Chinese. In 1919 Sin Po sent him to China to negotiate with the government there about the matter of potential repudiation of that citizenship; when he tried to re-enter the Indies, the Dutch would not let him in. In his absence Sin Po appointed Tjoe Bou San both editor-in-chief and director of the newspaper, and Hauw resigned. By 1922, when Hauw had abandoned his public opposition to the Dutch citizenship law, he was allowed to re-enter.

=== Keng Po ===
In 1923, due to a disagreement with Tjoe Bou San of Sin Po, Hauw founded a new newspaper called Keng Po, which he launched on August 1. At first he appointed himself director and editor-in-chief, although he soon stepped aside from editorial duties. Khoe Woen Sioe, who would be director of the paper in later years, joined as an editor at some point in the early years.

In early 1928 Hauw was returning from a business trip to Tangerang he suffered some kind of health crisis and people remarked that he seemed different after that. He died in Batavia at age 51 on April 7, 1928, apparently of a stroke.
