= Koning Willem III School te Batavia =

Elite school in the Dutch East Indies

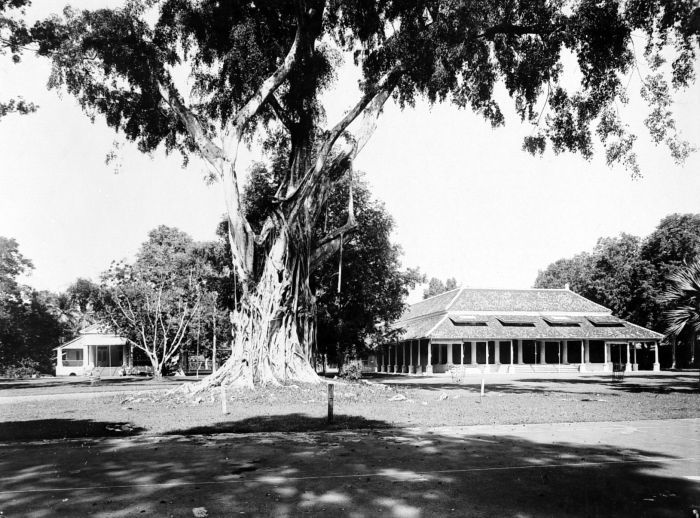
View of the grounds of the Koning Willem III school c.1910-1932

Koning Willem III School te Batavia, abbreviated as KW III School, was an elite school in the Dutch East Indies which operated from 1860 to 1942 at the 5-year Hogere Burgerschool level and with an extra component for training officers and civil servants for the colonial service. Among its students were a number of key members of the Indonesian National Awakening including Agus Salim, Achmad Djajadiningrat, Mohammad Husni Thamrin, Ernest Douwes Dekker, and Johannes Latuharhary.

It became a demobilization center later on where personnel after deployment would return, often for a celebratory meal. One such meal was held on August 31, 1948, hosting between 700 and 800 demoralizers.
