= The Siauw Giap =

The Siauw Giap (1922 in Malang, Dutch East Indies – 2002 in Leiden, Netherlands) was a Dutch sociologist and social historian of Chinese Indonesians.

== Early life ==
In 1935 The became a student at the Meer Uitgebreid Lager Onderwijs school in Malang. He studied history and sociology at the University of Indonesia from 1946 to 1949, which was during the period of the Indonesian National Revolution.

== Career and life in Europe ==
In 1948 he received a grant (Malino Scholarship) to study in the Netherlands, and studied sociology at the University of Amsterdam from 1951 to 1961, and from 1954 onwards was research assistant to Wim Wertheim. During this time The married Wertheim's daughter Marijke Wertheim. He then became a research-assistant at Yale University in 1961-1962 and at the Vrije Universiteit Brussel from 1963 to 1966. In 1963 The and Marijke Wertheim had a son, Wim Hay-ing.

In 1966 he became a research fellow at the Sinological Institute at the University of Leiden, where he remained until 1987.

The died in Leiden on February 20, 2002.

== Published works ==
- Het Indonesische vraagstuk en de Britse pers (1955)
- Urbanisatieproblemen in Indonesië (1960)
- Social change in Java, 1900-1930 (1962), with Wim Wertheim
- The Samin and Samat movements in Java : two examples of peasant resistance (1969)
- Rural unrest in West Kalimantan : the Chinese uprising in 1914 (1981)
- Religious adaption: the Moslem Chinese in Indonesia : a preliminary view (1985)
- Cina Muslim di Indonesia (1986), with Bahtiar Effendy and H Ridwan Saidi
