= Sin Po (newspaper) =

Former Indonesian newspaper

Sin Po 新報
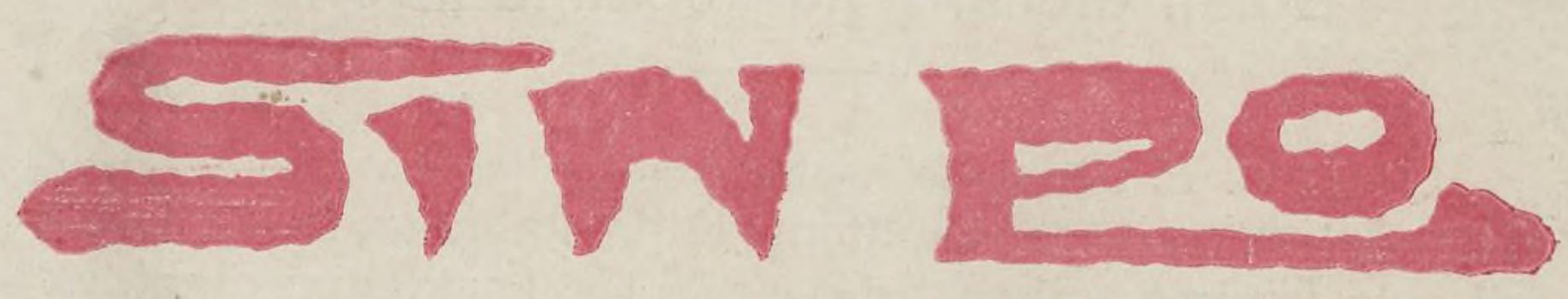
- Sin Po weekly edition 9 June 1923
- Type: Weekly newspaper (1910-1912); Daily newspaper (1912-1965)
- Format: Broadsheet
- Founder(s): Lauw Giok Lan and Yoe Sin Gie
- Founded: 1 October 1910
- Ceased publication: 1942 (first); 1 October 1965 (second and final)
- Relaunched: 1946 (second)
- Political alignment: Pro-Indonesian; Pro-Chinese
- Language: Malay
- Headquarters: Jakarta
- Country: Dutch East Indies; Indonesia

Sin Po
- Traditional Chinese: 新報
- Simplified Chinese: 新报
Transcriptions
Standard Mandarin
- Hanyu Pinyin: Xīn Bào
- Wade–Giles: Hsin1 Pao4
Southern Min
- Hokkien POJ: Sin-pò

Sin Po (Chinese: 新報; Pe̍h-ōe-jī: Sin-pò; lit. '(The) News') was a Peranakan Chinese Malay-language newspaper published in the Dutch East Indies and later Indonesia. It expressed the viewpoint of Chinese nationalism and defended the interests of Chinese Indonesians and was for several decades one of the most widely read Malay newspapers in the Indies. It existed under various names until 1965.

== History ==
=== Lauw Giok Lan ===
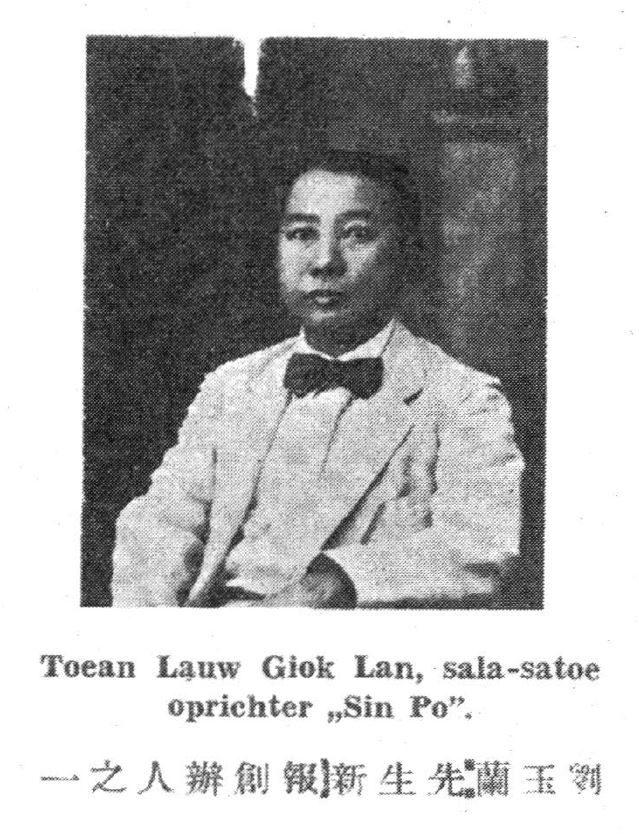
Toean Lauw Giok Lan

The paper was founded in Batavia on 1 October 1910 after Lauw Giok Lan came up with the concept and approached Yoe Sin Gie. The two men had worked at Perniagaan, a conservative Chinese newspaper closely allied with the Chinese Officer system and the Tiong Hoa Hwee Koan. When Sin Po launched, Lauw took on the editorial duties and Yoe took on the administrative aspects, with Hauw Tek Kong as director. At first it was only a weekly paper. The paper quickly became very successful.

Lauw was an experienced publisher who had worked for the Van Dorp Co., which had published Java Bode and Bintang Betawi. He had been editor of Perniagaan since 1907.

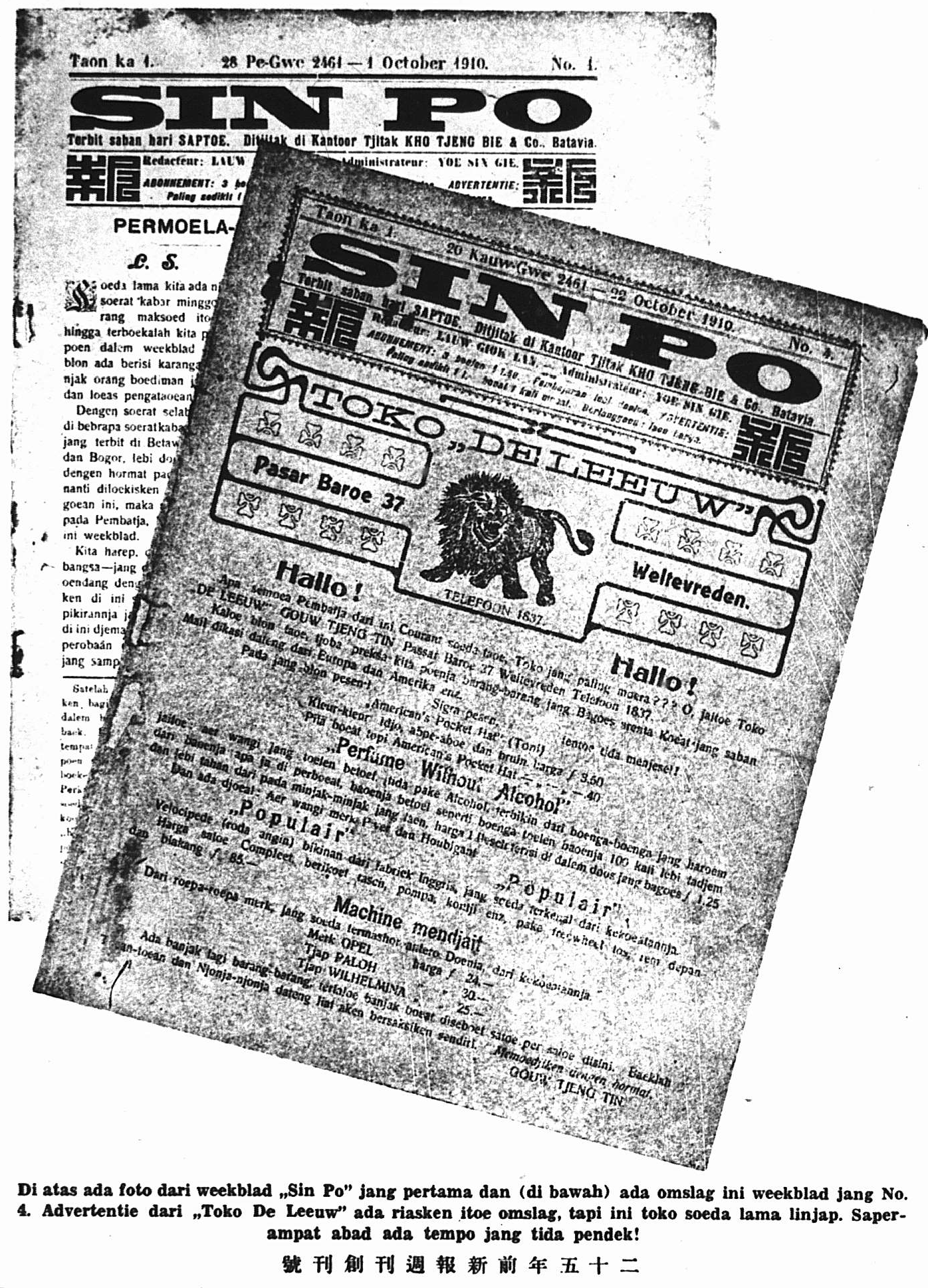
Front covers of the first and fourth issues of Sin Po, dating from October 1910

=== J. R. Razoux Kühr ===
In 1912, when Sin Po became a daily paper, it hired a European (Indo) editor-in-chief, J. R. Razoux Kühr. The higher legal status of Europeans made this standard practice in Malay newspapers of the time because legal punishments for contravening press laws would fall less harshly upon them. Razoux Kühr was a strange figure, a disgraced former civil servant who had written an English-language booklet denouncing the Dutch system of laws. However, he had good relations with the Peranakan Chinese community and was an excellent writer who spoke several languages.

By late 1912 he had already been called before the court for printing defamatory content in Sin Po. The article in question had described the murder of a Chinese person in Sukabumi, and by its factual description was said to stir up hatred against the Indies government.

In early 1913, Sin Po got into a feud with some more conservative elements of the Chinese community due to its criticism of the colonial Chinese Officer system. That feud resulted in calls to boycott Sin Po. In particular the paper harshly attacked Phoa Keng Hek and Khouw Kim An, high-profile Chinese Officers, and accused them of corruption and abuse of authority. One Sin Po editor was forced to resign from the board of the Tiong Hoa Hwee Koan and was then expelled as a member of the organization.

By 1915, rival newspaper Perniagaan was waging their war against Sin Po on a new front. They accused the paper, under Razoux Kühr's tenure, of accepting payment for its reporters to travel. One case that they printed proof of was a receipt for payment of a Sin Po journalist to Garut where they were hosted by the local Chinese community and directed to investigate a district head who had been mistreating them. Since Razoux Kühr was already a pariah in the European community at this point, it only added to their suspicions that he was an unscrupulous figure.

In March 1916 Razoux Kühr stepped down as editor, ostensibly for health reasons, and the paper got its first Chinese editor, Kwee Hing Tjiat. Although Razoux Kühr was announced as editor in chief of Sin Po's rival paper, Perniagaan in 1918, it was apparently short-lived, and he never again held a prominent editorial job.

=== Kwee Hing Tjiat ===
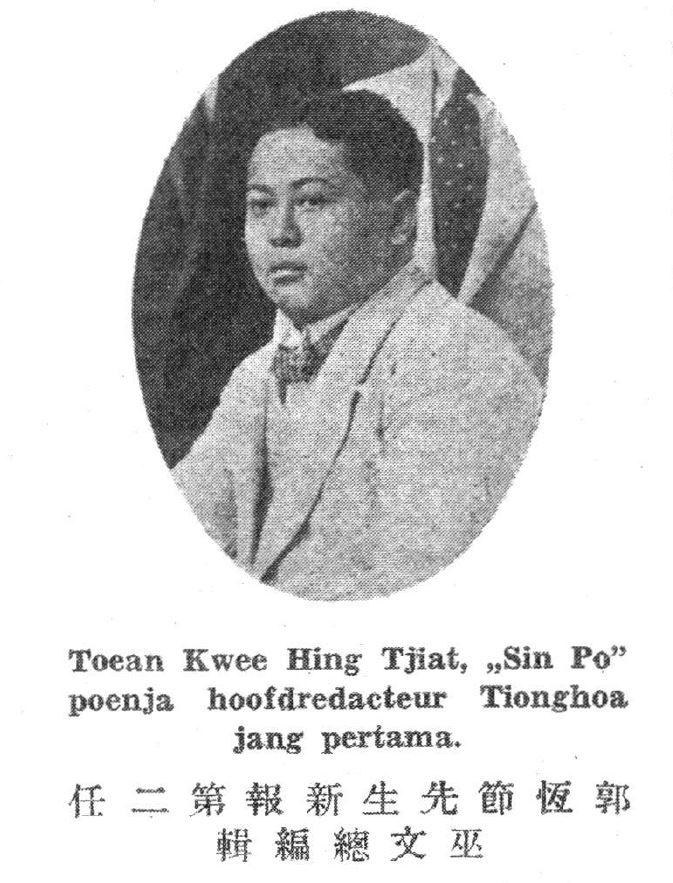
Toean Kwee Hing Tjiat

Kwee Hing Tjiat was a lifelong journalist who by 1916 had already been editor of Bok Tok and Tjhoen Tjhioe in Surabaya as well as Palita in Yogyakarta. Under his tenure the paper took on an even more aggressively Chinese nationalist line. The paper continued to develop its very pro-Peking and pro-Totok Chinese position and to harshly criticize the Chinese Officer system. Hence the paper's bitter feud with rival paper Perniagaan continued under Kwee's tenure. Historian Leo Suryadinata notes that Sin Po came to lead a distinct group at this time which he terms the Sin Po group. He states that this group believed in Peranakan-Totok unity, Chinese language education among Peranakan and non-participation in local Indies politics. Kwee stepped down from his position in 1918 and went to work for a private company called Hoo Tik Thay.

=== Tjoe Bou San ===
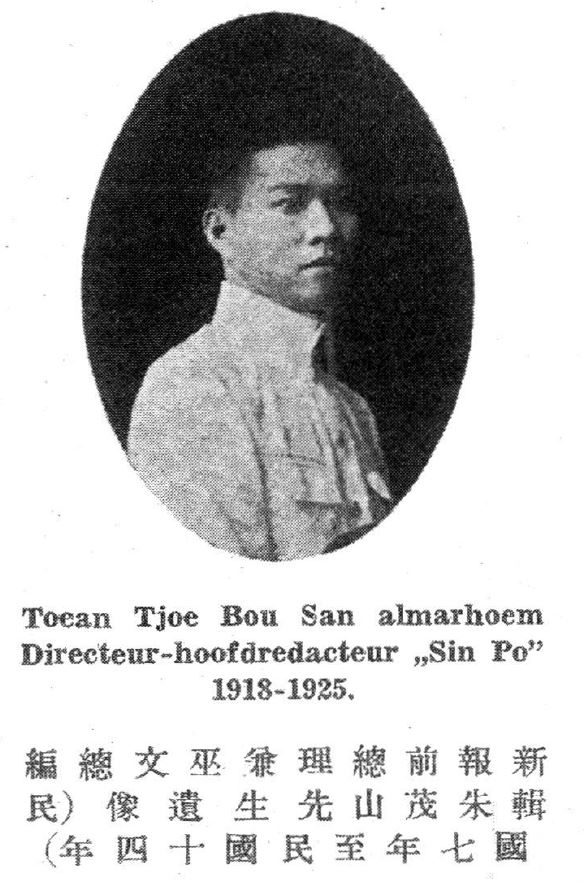
Toean Tjoe Bou San

In 1919 Tjoe Bou San, who had previously been editor-in-chief of Tjhoen Tjhioe and Hoa Tok Po, took up the position at Sin Po. He had already been working at Sin Po at a lower level since his return from China in 1918. It was at around this time that the former editor Razoux Kühr, now at Perniagaan, got into a legal dispute with director Hauw Tek Kong of Sin Po. It is unclear what the substance of the case was.

When Hauw Tek Kong was barred from re-entering the Indies after a visit to China, Tjoe briefly became director of the paper as well as editor-in-chief. It was under his tenure that Sin Po launched its Chinese language edition in February 1920. Lie Chen Fu was the first editor-in-chief of that edition, followed by Chuang Yu Lin from 1921–27, and Hsieh Tso Yi from 1927-29. That Chinese edition quickly became the most influential such paper in the Indies.

In 1922 Ang Jan Goan joined the editorial board of the newspaper. One of his first innovations was to launch an East Java edition of the paper in Surabaya in 1922, edited by Lim Bok Sioe, as well as a new paper called Bin Seng in Batavia. The purpose of Bin Seng, also a daily paper, was to cover local news in Batavia. Bin Seng was also edited by Tjoe Bou San under the pseudonym Oen Tjip Tiong; unfortunately, the paper did not last long. The paper also launched a new weekly publication in April 1923.

=== Kwee Kek Beng ===
When Tjoe Bou San died in 1925, Kwee Kek Beng became editor-in-chief while Ang Jan Goan was promoted to be director. Both men would be in those positions for several decades

Kwee Kek Beng was a Dutch-educated former schoolteacher who had been a contributor to Bin Seng and Java Bode before being hired as a junior editor at Sin Po in 1922. Like his predecessors, he was also a strong Chinese nationalist.

By the second half of the 1920s, with the Indonesian nationalist movement gaining strength, Sin Po moderated its pro-China line and became more sympathetic to the Indonesian perspective. Kwee himself was a close personal friend of Sukarno and other leaders of the movement. Their like-minded counterparts at Djawa Tengah in Semarang also become more Indies-oriented. Many of the Sin Po group who had advocated that Peranakan Chinese 'go back' to China for work and education gave up on this campaign.

In January 1927 the paper launched yet another publication, De Chineesche Revue. This was a weekly journal published in European languages, including but not limited to Dutch, in which Chinese intellectuals could discuss the issues of the day in a more serious manner. Kwee was the driving force behind the creation of this journal, as he had seen how many intellectual journals were published in the Netherlands and believed the Indies Chinese were capable of writing at that level as well. Henri Borel, a Sinologist, was influential in it for a time.

In the late 1930s Sin Po shifted its campaigning towards fundraising for China and spreading an anti-Japanese message among the Indies Chinese readership. The paper managed to raise 1.7 million guilders from 1937 to 1942 for the Chinese war effort against Japan. A comic strip Put On, by Kho Wan Gie, also started to be serialized in Sin Po from 1931 onwards.

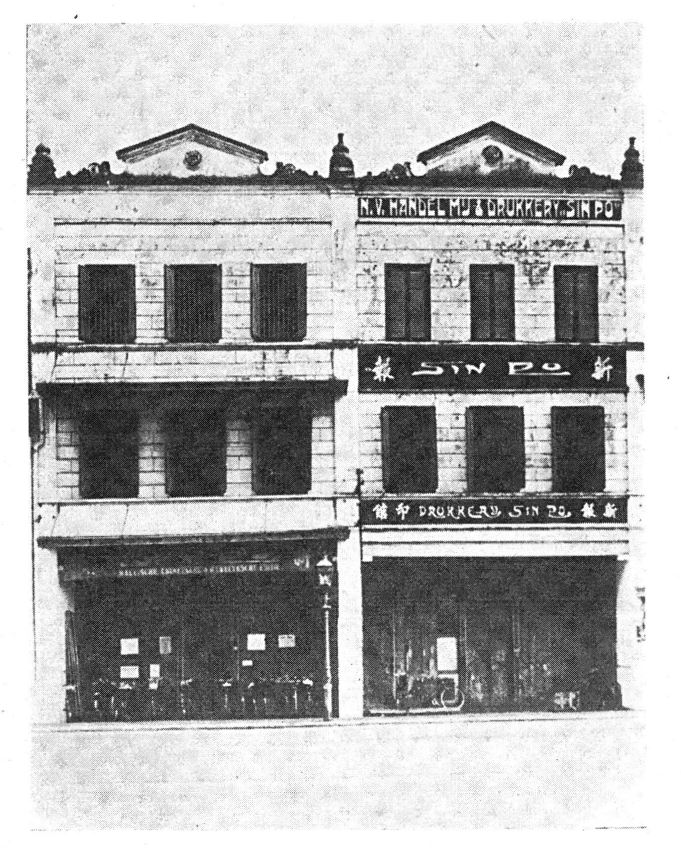
Sin Po office in Batavia, Dutch East indies c.1935

During the Japanese occupation of the Dutch East Indies, Kwee managed to avoid arrest and hid in Bandung from 1942-5. Sin Po continued to publish in a limited form, without an editor-in-chief and constrained by strict Japanese censorship. Another paper called Kung Yung Pao, edited by Oey Tiang Tjoei briefly took the place of Sin Po in Batavia society during this era. After the war ended the paper resumed publication and Kwee returned to his position, but he got into a feud with publisher Ang Jan Goan, and resigned as editor-in-chief in 1947.

=== Gouw Tiauw Goan ===
After Kwee resigned, he was briefly replaced by Thio In Lok, who departed after nine months. His more long-term replacement was a veteran journalist named Gouw Tiauw Goan. Chinese-educated, and having been interned by the Japanese during the war, his written contributions to the paper while editor focused more on China.

The paper continued after Indonesian independence. Several of its editors were arrested and held without charge as part of the mass arrests of leftists and Chinese Indonesians ordered by the Soekiman Cabinet in August 1951; this included editors A. Karim, Tjia Tjo Soen, Lieng Jing Chen, Lee Swie Kee and Oen Tek Hian, as well as the director Ang Jan Goan. It was forced to change its name in 1958 due to government regulations. It became Pantjawarta and then Warta Bhakti. In this era the paper took a pro-PKI line and was therefore banned in the crackdown after the September 30 Movement (G-30-S) in 1965.

== Legacy ==
Since 2023, two Indonesian companies, PT Catra Media Nusantara and PT Selaras Banten Bersama use Sin Po as the name of their news media: web portal SinPo.id and television channel Sin Po TV, respectively. Both are believed to be under the same ownership.
