= Warna Warta =

Defunct Dutch East Indies newspaper (1902–33)

Warna Warta (Malay: "various news", literally "colour news", known in Chinese as 综合新闻 Zònghé xīnwén, "general news") was a Malay language Peranakan Chinese newspaper published in Semarang, Dutch East Indies from 1902 to 1933. Alongside its more popular rival Djawa Tengah, it was highly influential among the Chinese Indonesian population of Semarang during this time.

== History ==
Warna Warta was founded in February 1902 with V.W. Doppert as its first editor and with Kwa Wan Hong as its director and administrator. The novelist F. D. J. Pangemanann was also an editor in its early years. Its managing company was called the N. V. Drukkerij en Handel in schrijfbehoeften, or in Chinese Hap Sing Kongsie. In its early years the paper billed itself as the mouthpiece of the Tiong Hoa Hwee Koan, a diasporic Chinese education movement.

Within a year, the paper was already suffering from the legal troubles that it would face during the coming decades. In 1903 one of the paper's journalists, Oh Boen Kwie, was arrested and fled his sentence of a month of chain-gang labour for fraud; he was also accused of printing a slanderous article in the pages of Warna Warta. The charges relating to that article were then filed against the editor, Njoo Goan Sioe; apparently it mentioned that a local official had been arrested for fraud. He was found guilty of defamation and sentenced to a month's imprisonment.

Before long, F. D. J. Pangemanann left the paper to work at Bintang Betawi in Batavia and later for Perniagaan. But his brother J. H. Pangemanann soon joined the paper as a new editor.

J. H. Pangemanann was summoned before the local court in Semarang several times during this era for printing unflattering coverage of local businessmen, first in July 1908 for reporting unfavorably on a local civil engineer, and then in March 1909 for printing a defamatory article about Tio San Hien, an important Chinese businessman from Surakarta. Apparently the article accused Tio of throwing a laving feast during the period of mourning after the death of the Guangxu Emperor the previous November.

In August 1909 it was announced that J. H. Pangemanann had fallen ill and was stepping down, and that editorship fell temporarily to Kwik King Hin and L. J. Mamahit. In September 1909, it was announced that F. D. J. Pangemanann would leave Perniagaan to return to Warna Warta as editor-in-chief. However, he was not in the position long as he died in 1910.

=== 1910s ===
In 1911 the new editor, Phoa Tjoen Hoay, nineteen years old, was given an extremely harsh punishment of six months of forced labour for printing an article questioning the value of Indies Chinese learning the Dutch language before they learned Chinese. For this he was said to have incited the population to hatred and disdain against the Government of the Indies and aroused contempt between the Chinese and Dutch. The sentence was later reduced from chain gang labour to a prison sentence of the same duration. Phoa's brother Phoa Tjoen Hoat was also hired as editor of the paper in 1914.

J.C. Weijde Muller became editor-in-chief after that, but stepped down in March 1919 Weidemuller and Phoa Tjoen Hoaij was temporarily appointed in his place. In June of the same year Tjio Peng Hong (formerly editor-in-chief of Andalas) would take on the role at Warna Warta. However, he apparently did not stay long in the position.

=== 1920s ===
A number of interesting figures worked at the paper in the early 1920s. Kho Tjoen Wan, a close ally of the communist Semaoen, was called to court in 1920 for writing critically about proposals for a native militia in the Indies. It seems that Kho was lead editor for a time but left the paper in January 1922. Tjondrokoesoemo, an upper class Javanese journalist, briefly became editor at Warna Warta in 1921 after clashing with his bosses at Djawa Tengah over matters of editorial independence. However, he resigned in 1922 for health reasons. As well, the translator, journalist and historian Liem Thian Joe was editor of Warna Warta for a time during the 1920s as well.

In 1922 some of the paper's editors involved themselves in efforts to create a new union for Chinese journalists in Semarang, the Chineesche journalistenkring. Lauw Kong Hoe, editor-in-chief, was chairman, while Louw Eng Hoey, another editor at the paper, was vie-president. Most of the other positions in on the board of the organization were held by editors from rival Semarang Chinese paper Djawa Tengah.

The paper was prosecuted by the government in a high-profile case in 1925 when the editor-in-chief, Lauw Kong Hoe, was arrested for printing an editorial entitled Apalah jang Pamerentah maoe (Malay: What does the government want) which was deemed to be "hateful". The article was apparently written in response to an possibly false ANETA (wire service) article which said that the government was banning the raising of funds to send to China. While in preventative detention he was handed a statement by a local prosecutor which he was invited to sign, stating that he would not publish such forbidden pieces in the future. He refused, stating that it went against the professional code of journalism to sign such a statement. The tone of Lauw's criticism of the government was deemed to be too harsh and he was reminded in court that he had promised in a past press censorship case to behave himself.

=== 1930s ===
The arrival of the Great Depression in the Indies caused financial difficulties for many newspapers, and Warna Warta was no exception. In 1931, a longtime editor Saroehoem left the board of the paper and left Semarang for his native Tapanuli, citing disagreements with his colleagues. Lauw Kong Hoey also stepped down as editor-in-chief at some point during this time. In early March 1932 the paper attempted to restructure, appointing Tan Boen Soan, formerly of Keng Po as editor-in-chief and Ong Lhee Soeij became the paper's new director. The paper shortened its format and deeply reduced its price, blaming the inability of readers to pay their subscription fees. However, by November of the same year Tan joined the management of the newspaper and Tan Hwa Bouw, who had previously edited both Warna Warta and more recently Siang Po in Batavia, became the new editor-in-chief.

He soon faced more of the legal problems which had hounded his predecessors. The Dutch frowned on the paper's coverage of the conflict between China and Japan, applying a new kind of press offence called persbreidel for the first time against Warna Warta, which forced the paper to briefly cease publication.

=== Djit Po ===
In March 1933, Warna Warta renamed itself Djit Po; Ong Lee Soei remained as director and Tan Hoa Bouw became editor. It continued publishing as a daily newspaper.

At the end of 1935 it was announced that the former editor Saroehoem was returning to become editor-in-chief of the paper. However, it is unclear how much longer Djit Po continued to publish. There are few mentions of it after 1935 and the National Library of Indonesia only has copies of it from 1933 to 1935.
