= Perniagaan =

Defunct Dutch East Indies newspaper (1907–30)

- Type: Newspaper
- Owner: Various (including Gouw Peng Liang)
- Founded: 1907
- Language: Malay
- Headquarters: Batavia, Dutch East Indies

Perniagaan (Malay: Commerce, known in Chinese as 商业新闻 Shāngyè xīnwén) was a Malay-language Peranakan Chinese newspaper in Batavia, Dutch East Indies, that ran from 1907 to 1930. The newspaper was the conservative rival of Sin Po and was closely associated with the Tiong Hoa Hwee Koan and the Chinese officer system.

== History ==
Perniagaan's history is closely associated with the Tiong Hoa Hwee Koan (THHK), an Indonesian Chinese reformist and educational movement that opened branches in many cities in the Indies during the first decades of the twentieth century. Many members of the Batavia THHK owned shares in the company that owned the newspaper, and the paper regularly covered THHK activities.

=== Kabar Perniagaan ===
An earlier iteration of the newspaper was called Kabar Perniagaan (Malay: Commerce News). The name may have been a simple translation of the common Dutch-language name for a business newspaper, Handelsblad. That paper was founded in 1903, printed in Batavia by Tjoe Toei Ijang press, and edited by F. Wiggers, Lie Kim Hok and Tan Kim Bo; it was closely associated with the Tiong Hoa Hwee Koan. It was then sold to another Indonesian Chinese printing company, N.V. Boekhandel en Drukkerij Hoa Siang In Kiok. Tan Kim Bo, who would later be an important THHK activist, was also briefly editor of the paper in 1904. It was printed under that title until 1906. A notable contributor of articles to this early version of the newspaper was Lie Kim Hok, the "Father of Sino-Malay"—a Chinese newspaperman and poet of an earlier generation. Another was Tio Ie Soei, who joined the paper in 1905 and would go on to have decades of work in Indonesian journalism. Phoa Tjoen Hoat became editor in 1905. A non-Chinese editor, F. D. J. Pangemanann (from Menado), was briefly editor during 1906 as well.

=== Perniagaan ===
It is unclear exactly when or why the newspaper shortened its name (around 1906 or 1907). Some histories, such as that of Ahmat Adam, treat them as two separate newspapers, while others consider them to be the same.

In 1907 Lauw Giok Lan, a journalist active in the Tiong Hoa Hwee Koan, became editor of Perniagaan. Lauw apparently had some disagreements with the owners of Perniagaan because around 1910 he started to discuss founding a competing paper with Yoe Sin Gie, who worked as a bookkeeper for the company. This new paper was called Sin Po, and it would eventually surpass Perniagaan and become its rival. When that paper started printing a daily edition in 1912, Lauw left his position at Perniagaan.

In the same year that Lauw had joined (1907), another young journalist named Gouw Peng Liang was appointed as an editor of Perniagaan. He would soon become an important figure in the paper's history. In 1909 he became editor-in-chief. And after stepping down from that position in 1916, he bought the newspaper in 1917 and made himself director. During the period of Gouw Peng Liang's editorship, the historian and journalist Liem Thian Joe worked for the paper. For a time in 1918, J. R. Razoux Kuhr, who had previously been editor of Sin Po, was appointed editor-in-chief of the paper, but he left before the year ended.

From 1926 to 1929, Thio Tjin Boen, who had previously been editor of Taman Sari and Warna Warta, became editor-in-chief of Perniagaan. During his time as editor, the longtime owner and director, Gouw Peng Liang, died. In 1928, two months before he died, Gouw sold Perniagaan to Liem Tiauw Goan. At around this time, H. Husino (AKA Oh Sien Hong) became editor-in-chief of Perniagaan.

In 1930 Phoa Liong Gie purchased the newspaper and renamed it Siang Po.
