= Tiong Hoa Hwee Koan =

Indonesian Chinese organisation

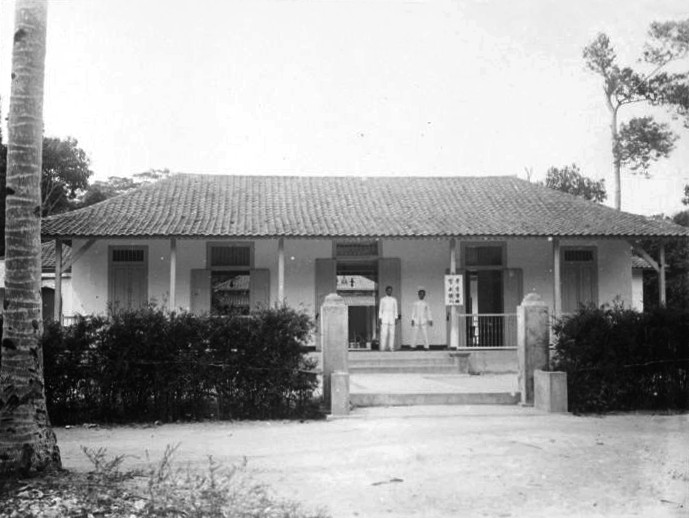
Tiong Hoa Hwee Koan building, ca. 1914

Tiong Hoa Hwee Koan (THHK, traditional Chinese: 中華會館; simplified Chinese: 中华会馆; Pe̍h-ōe-jī: Tiong-hôa Hōe-koán; pinyin: Zhōnghuá Huìguǎn; lit. 'The Chinese Guildhall') was an Indonesian Chinese organization founded on 17 March 1900 in Batavia, Dutch East Indies.

Its founders included former classmates Lie Kim Hok and Phoa Keng Hek Sia, both of whom had been educated at Sierk Coolsma's missionary school in the Dutch East Indies. At first its mission was to renew and spread Confucian ideas and the general level of knowledge among the Chinese-Indonesian population of the Indies.
