= Rumah Pemilu =

- Genre: News Programme
- Created by: Rosianna Silalahi; Sri Sumarni
- Developed by: Rosianna Silalahi; Sri Sumarni
- Presented by: Maydop Elfrina; Ihsan Sitorus
- Country of origin: Indonesia
- Original language: Indonesian
- No. of seasons: 3

Production
- Running time: 60 minutes

Original release
- Network: Kompas TV
- Release: August 3, 2018 – present

Related
- Kompas; Rumah Pilkada

Rumah Pemlu is the Indonesian flagship news program which broadcast on Kompas TV. This program is about elections for president of parliament at various levels of government.

== History ==
Through from program the "Rumah Pemilu" (English: House of Elections) Kompas TV will be one of the moments awaited by the people of Indonesia. The simultaneous elections, legislative elections, and presidential elections will become the nation's new historical record. Rumah Pemilu 2019, readers have a basis for consideration to determine their political choices in a five-yearly democratic party.

== Portal news ==
Kompas Gramedia launched the official website about the 2024 election on www.rumahpemilu.id

== Season overviews ==
- Season 1: August 3, 2018 - February 21, 2020
- Season 2: January 23, 2023 - July 12, 2024
- Season 3: TBA
