= Rumah Pilkada =

- Genre: News programme
- Created by: Rosianna Silalahi; Sri Sumarni
- Developed by: Rosianna Silalahi; Sri Sumarni
- Presented by: Maydop Elfrina; Ihsan Sitorus
- Country of origin: Indonesia
- Original language: Indonesian
- No. of seasons: 4

Production
- Running time: 30 minutes

Original release
- Network: Kompas TV
- Release: January 8, 2018 – present

Related
- Kompas; Rumah Pemilu

Rumah Pilkada is the Indonesian flagship news program which broadcast on Kompas TV. This program is about Elections in Indonesia in various regions that held from 2018. 2020. and 2024 local elections.

== History ==
Through the program Rumah Pilkada (English: House Of Pilkada), Kompas TV will presented with KPU a number of events for the community to get to know all the candidates for regional heads who will fight in the elections. Of course through this 'Rumah Pilkada' Kompas TV wants to make the momentum of the elections as a good, honest and fair democratic process like in a house, So the term house is taken to give context that we are in one house so that it is demanded by honesty, so we can compete but must be managed with the concept of kinship.

== Season overviews ==
- Season 1: January 8, 2018 - August 2, 2018
- Season 2: October 21, 2020 - December 25, 2020
- Season 3: July 15, 2024 - December 6, 2024
- Season 4: TBA
