= List of universities in Tangerang =

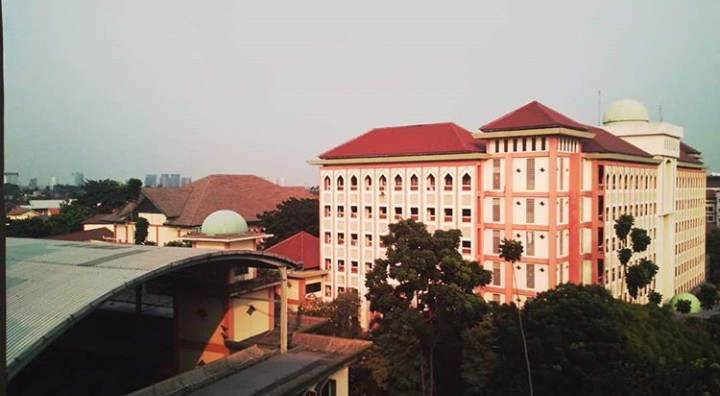
Syarif Hidayatullah State Islamic University Jakarta

This article presents a list of universities in Tangerang and South Tangerang in Indonesia. Most of them are private universities.

== Public universities ==
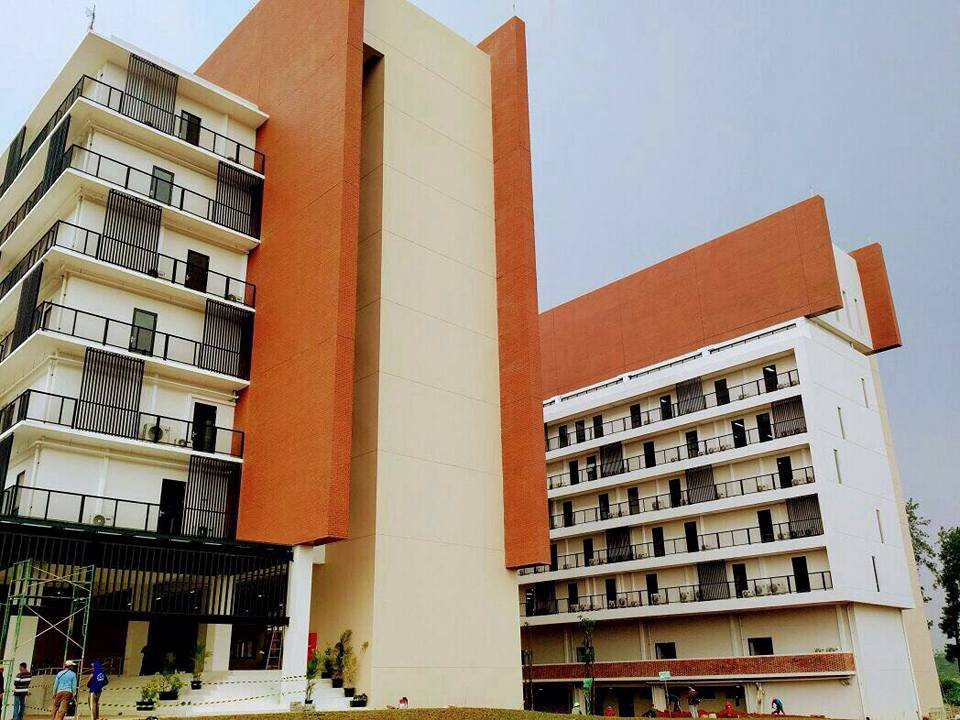
Atma Jaya Catholic University of Indonesia

- Syarif Hidayatullah State Islamic University Jakarta
- Sriwijaya State Hindu College

== Private universities ==
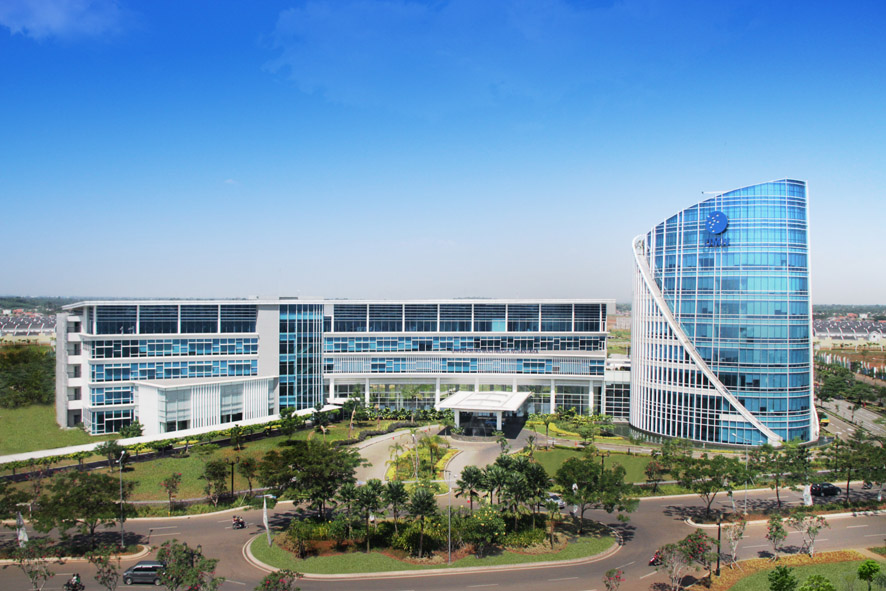
Universitas Multimedia Nusantara

- Indonesia Institute of Technology
- Pamulang University
- Atma Jaya Catholic University of Indonesia
- International University Liaison Indonesia
- Muhammadiyah University of Tangerang
- Syekh Yusuf Islamic University
- Pelita Harapan University
- Multimedia Nusantara University
- Pramita Indonesia University
- Swiss German University
- Prasetiya Mulya University
- Bina Nusantara University, Alam Sutera Campus
- Matana University
- Pradita University
- Bunda Mulia University
- Pembangunan Jaya University
- BINUS-ASO School of Engineering
- Monash University, Indonesia Campus
- Raharja University
