= Timothy Marbun =

Indonesian presenter (born 1982)

- Born: Timothy Marbun; March 21, 1982 (age 44); Lhokseumawe, Aceh, Indonesia
- Other name: Timmy
- Occupations: News anchor, journalist
- Years active: 2007–present
- Known for: Presenter Sapa Indonesia Pagi on Kompas TV

Timothy Marbun (born 21 March 1982, in Lhokseumawe, North Aceh, Nanggroe Aceh Darussalam) is an Indonesian presenter.

== Early life ==
He lived in Aceh, Jakarta, and in Oklahoma in his childhood, before finally settling in Jakarta. Marbun is the son of Dimpos Marbun and Rosliwaty Siregar.

He is an alumnus of Jakarta 70 Public High School and the University of East London/HELP University, Kuala Lumpur.

== Career ==
He began his journalism career at Indosiar. Marbun filled in at the Fokus Pagi on Indosiar and became one of the main male presenters in the program Fokus Pagi. He covered social upheavals in Middle Eastern countries and bloody demonstrations in Bangkok, Thailand.

Marbun is one of the owners of the "Sabang 16" Coffee Shop in the Tebet area of Jakarta. Marbun was chosen as the "Most Favorite Bachelor" in the 2011 version of Cleo Indonesia Magazine. He is active in Kompas TV as a producer and news reader, and hosted Kata Kita.

In 2011, he started working for Kompas TV. Marbun, Bayu Sutiyono, and Cindy Sistyarani from TV One all moved to Kompas TV. Marbun, Sutiyono and Glory Rosary Oyong guided the program Sapa Indonesia at Kompas TV.

On June 30, 2013, Timothy married Sumi Yang at the Shangri-La Hotel in Jakarta.

He has a son, Russell Marbun, named after a character from "Up!"

== TV Programs ==
- Fokus Pagi (Indosiar, 2007-2011)
- Halo Polisi (Indosiar, 2008-2011)
- Kompas Malam (Kompas TV, 2011–2014)
- Kompas Petang (Kompas TV, 2011–2014)
- Newstar (Kompas TV, 2011–2015)
- Sapa Indonesia Pagi (Kompas TV, 2015–2023)
- Talk With Timothy (Kompas TV, 2017–2018)
- Merdeka Ataoe Mati (Kompas TV, 2018)
- VVIP (Very-Very Interesting Person) (Kompas TV, 2020–2021)
