= Santika Indonesia Hotels & Resorts =

Hotel chain from Indonesia

PT Grahawita Santika
- Trade name: Santika Indonesia Hotels & Resorts
- Company type: Subsidiary
- Industry: Hospitality
- Founded: 22 August 1981
- Number of locations: 112
- Parent: Kompas Gramedia Group
- Website: mysantika.com

Santika Indonesia Hotels & Resorts is an Indonesian hotel group owned by mass media conglomerate Kompas Gramedia through its subsidiary PT. Grahawita Santika. Established in 1981, Santika Indonesia Hotels & Resorts has 112 hotels in 40 cities in Indonesia.

== History ==
PT Grahawita Santika was established to manage the hospitality industry under Kompas Gramedia Group on 22 August 1981. Investing in hospitality industry was a financial diversification plan for the group after the closure of its daily newspaper Pos Kota in 1978 which put many jobs at stake. The group's first purchase was the Hotel Soeti in Bandung, which was extended from 33 to 70 rooms in 1988, renamed Hotel Santika Bandung, and awarded 3 stars by the Minister of Tourism, Post and Telecommunications, Susilo Sudarman in 1989.

At the beginning, the proposal for establishing a hotel was not approved, because at that time, hotel business was considered a negative connotation and the Return on Investment (ROI) was progressing slowly. However, Binawarman Sardjan, who was a member on the investment team of Kompas Gramedia Group at that time, convinced the Chairman of the investment team of Kompas Gramedia Group, Indra Gunawan, to approve the proposal. Because of the persistence and hard work of Binawarman Sardjan, Hotel Santika was established.

Several years after the first Santika Indonesia Hotels & Resorts was inaugurated, Santika Indonesia Hotels & Resorts developed itself and reached about 40 properties across Indonesia. In accordance with its brand value, "Indonesian Home" and the service motto, "Hospitality from the Heart", Santika Indonesia Hotels & Resorts always emphasizes the value of Indonesian culture, including the hospitality to all guests.

== Activities ==
Santika Indonesia Hotels and Resorts has 7 main brands, namely The Samaya and The Kayana as The Royal Collection, The Anvaya Beach Resorts as a 5 star hotel (opened 2016), Hotel Santika Premiere as a 4 star hotel, Hotel Santika as a 3 star hotel, Kampi Hotel as an instagenic hotel 3 stars, Amaris Hotel is a 2 star smart hotel. The specialty of each Santika Indonesia Hotels & Resorts hotel unit lies in the strong characteristics of Indonesian culture both in terms of architecture and the services provided.

As of 2023, Santika Indonesia Hotels & Resorts operates a total of 112 hotels throughout Indonesia, spread over seven brands, from economy (Amaris), to midscale (Kampi and Hotel Santika), upper-midscale (Hotel Santika Premiere), upscale (Anvaya), and luxury (Kayana and Samaya). While Amaris, Hotel Santika, and Hotel Santika Premiere properties exist throughout the country, Bali houses the company's sole Anvaya and two Samaya properties, plus one of the two Kayana properties (the other one is located in the neighboring island of Lombok), while the only Kampi property is located in Surabaya.

== See also ==
- Tourism in Indonesia
