= TopSkor =

Indonesian sports daily newspaper

- Langsung • Lugas • Eksklusif! (Live • Straight • Exclusive!)
- Type: Daily sports newspaper
- Format: Broadsheet
- Owner: PT Sportjaya Sukses Lestari
- Founder(s): Entong Nursanto; Roni Pangemanan
- Founded: January 6, 2005; 21 years ago
- Ceased publication: March 23, 2020
- City: Jakarta
- Country: Indonesia
- Website: skor.id

Skor.id is an Indonesian online sports newspaper.

It was formerly a daily sports newspaper TopSkor (Top Score, stylized as topskor) published by PT Sportjaya Sukses Lestari. First published on 2005, the paper calls itself in its masthead "the first sports daily in Indonesia" (Indonesian: Harian Olahraga Pertama di Indonesia).

At its peak, TopSkor had reached 800,000 readers. According to AC Nielsen's survey in third quarter of 2010, it become the top newspaper by the number of readers in Jakarta alone.

== History ==
TopSkor was founded by Entong Nursanto, an entrepreneur in the printing and photocopying service, together with Roni Pangemanan. The paper was published in daily newspaper format, challenging other sports publication in Indonesia, including long-standing tabloid Bola. TopSkor hit the newsstands on 6 January 2005.

In 2010, TopSkor was awarded a Sanggraha Krida award by the Ministry of Youth and Sports, for its active role in "supporting sports development in the country through consistently constructive and motivating news".

Since March 2020, TopSkor "temporarily" ceased publication, as the COVID-19 pandemic impacts many aspects including sports. In its "last" edition on 23 March, editors stated that the paper will be "paused" and "will be back if the conditions are conducive" (sic). Despite the print closure, TopSkor still maintains its online portal.
