= Kontan =

Indonesian daily newspaper

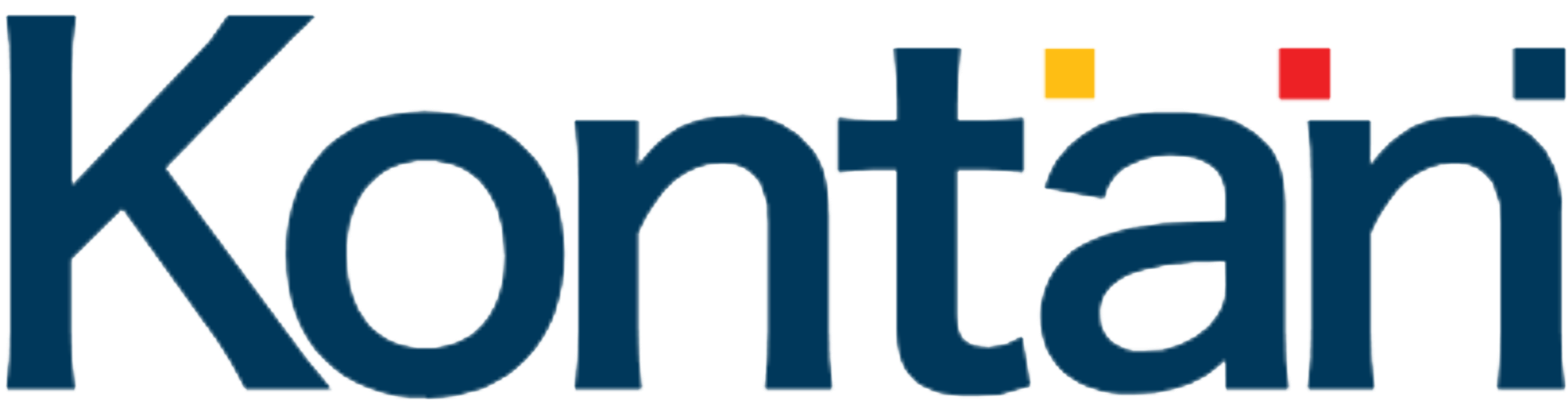
- Type: Daily and weekly newspaper
- Format: Broadsheet
- Owner(s): PT Grahanusa Mediatama (Kompas Gramedia)
- Founded: 30 September 1996; 29 years ago (weekly); 26 February 2007; 19 years ago (daily)
- Language: Indonesian
- Headquarters: Gedung Kontan; Jalan Kebayoran Lama 1119, South Jakarta
- City: Jakarta
- Country: Indonesia
- Sister newspapers: Kompas
- OCLC number: 221297917
- Website: www.kontan.co.id

Kontan (lit. 'Cash') is a business and financial regular publication in Indonesia published by PT Grahanusa Mediatama, owned by Kompas Gramedia. Kontan consists of two distinct publications: daily newspaper (as Kontan) and weekly tabloid-kind newspaper (as Tabloid Kontan), as well as an online portal.

Kontan was first published on 30 September 1996 as a weekly newspaper, covering Astra International ownership at its front page. The newspaper launched its own daily newspaper on 26 February 2007 as a "business and investment daily". Kontan launched its e-paper version a year later.
