= Domino mask =

Small mask covering only the area around the eyes

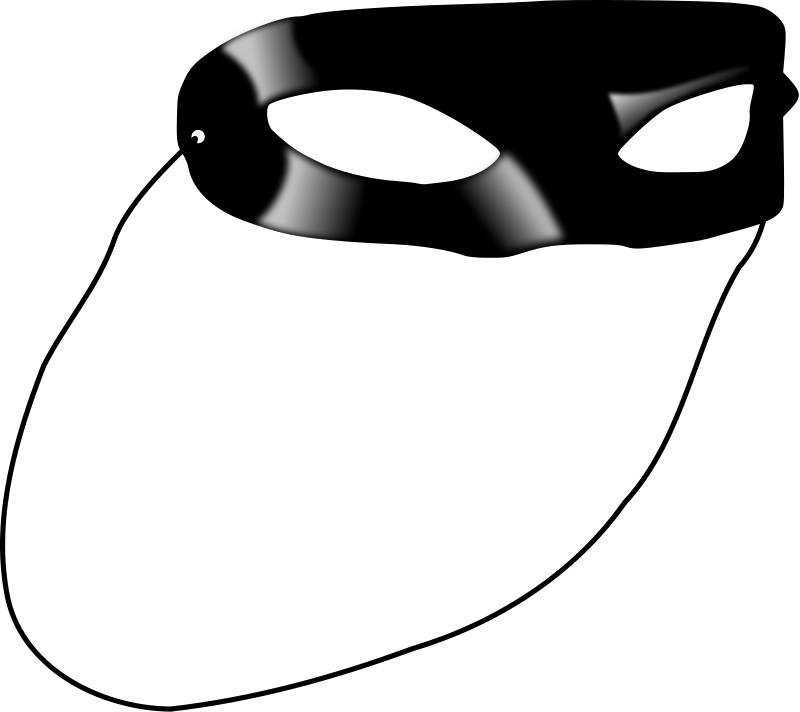

A domino mask is a small and often rounded mask covering only the area around the eyes and the space between them. The mask has seen special prevalence since the 18th century, when it became traditional wear in particular local manifestations of Carnival, particularly with Venetian Carnival, as part of a domino costume, which included the mask and a black cloak. Domino masks have found their way into a variety of high and popular art forms.

== History ==
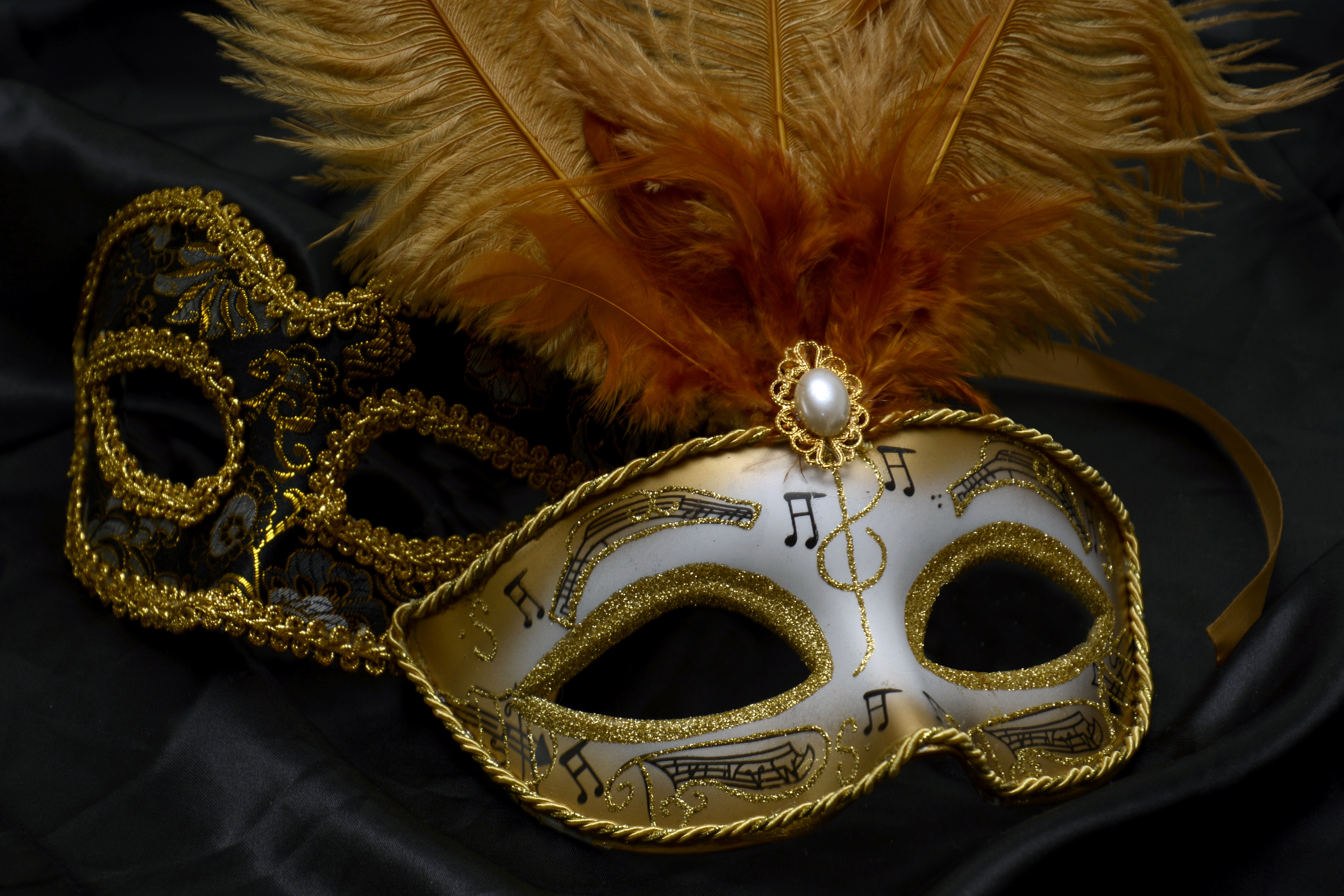
A carnival mask

Domino masks are worn during Carnival, e.g. at the Venetian Carnival, where it is part of the more extensive black (though occasionally white and blue) domino costume worn by both male and female participants. This fulfills the requirement of the masquerade that participants be masked or otherwise disguised, and achieves the elements of adventure, conspiracy, intrigue, and mystery that are distinctive of the masquerade atmosphere. The costume includes the mask, as well as a cloak to envelope the body, and sometimes a hood (bahoo).

The domino mask has also found its way into the political landscapes of non-Western cultures via political cartooning, though likely through the earlier influences of popular (and therefore exported) 18th century and later European and American purveyors of the same genre. For instance, Johnny Hidajat, the Indonesian New Order cartoonist (e.g., for Pos Kota and Stop in Jakarta), consistently features the character Djon Domino, and a relationship between this character and the domino mask has been argued.

The name is believed to derive from the Latin dominus, for "lord". The exact derivation is unknown.

== In art and other media ==
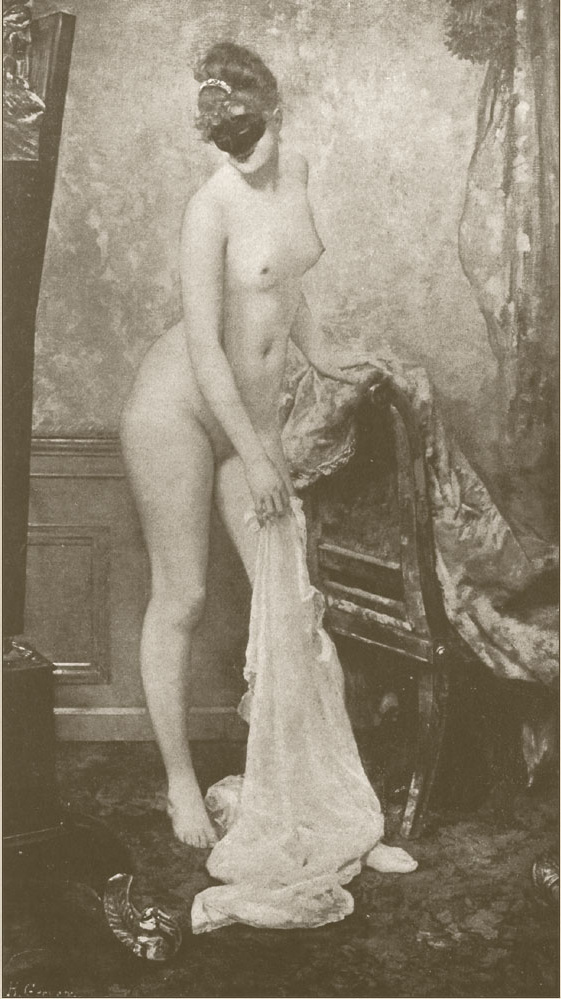
Gervex's 1885 portrait of Marie Renard in a domino mask, La Femme au Masque.

Domino masks have appeared in various images in art, such as La Femme au Masque, a painting by Henri Gervex in 1885. The subject is 22-year-old Parisienne Marie Renard, wearing only a domino mask.

In the 1910 novel Le Fantôme de l'Opera (The Phantom of the Opera), Christine Daaé instructs her childhood sweetheart, Raoul, to wear a "domino" (presumably a mask and cape) to meet her, as she is trying to hide their relationship from the jealous "Opera Ghost" who is stalking her.

The mask is popular in superhero comics, where it is often worn by costumed heroes and villains such as Zorro, the Lone Ranger, Robin the Boy Wonder and the Green Hornet, with the implication that they hide the hero's secret identity.

== See also ==
- Harlequin
