= Kompas (TV program) =

Indonesian television news program

- Logo used as of September 9, 2011
- Genre: News programme
- Created by: Jakob Oetama
- Developed by: Jakob Oetama; Taufik Mihardja
- Directed by: Yogi Arief Nugraha
- Presented by: Various
- Country of origin: Indonesia
- Original language: Indonesian
- No. of seasons: 8

Production
- Executive producer: Rosianna Silalahi
- Production location: Jakarta
- Running time: Various

Original release
- Network: Kompas TV
- Release: September 9, 2011 – present

Kompas (The Compass) is a television news program that broadcasts on the Indonesian TV station Kompas TV. This news program based newspaper same name. Its slogan is "Tegas, Terarah, & Menumbuhkan Harapan" (Decisive, Purposeful, & Raising Expectations).

== History ==
Kompas was launched on September 9, 2011 by Jakob Oetama. To greet all viewers, every articles reading always begins with "Saudara" (brother/sister), not "Pemirsa" (viewer) till present (Like Liputan 6).

Kompas also has an online news portal. The news portal, Kompas.com, was originally launched on September 14, 1995 to coincide with 16 years before Kompas TV's launched on September 9, 2011.

== Showtimes List ==
=== Kompas Pagi ===
- Everyday, 04.00 WIB - 07.00 WIB

=== Kompas Siang ===
- Weekdays, 11.00 WIB - 13.00 WIB
- Weekends, 11.00 WIB - 12.00 WIB

=== Kompas Petang ===
- Everyday, 16.00 WIB - 17.30 WIB

=== Kompas Malam ===
- Monday, Wednesday and Thursday, 21.30 WIB - 22.30 WIB
- Tuesday, 20.30 WIB - 21.30 WIB
- Friday, 22.00 WIB - 23.00 WIB
- Weekends, 21.00 WIB - 22.00 WIB

=== Kompas Sahur ===
- Everyday, 02.00 WIB - 03.00 WIB (Ramadan only)

=== Kompas Bisnis ===
- Weekdays, 09.00 WIB - 09.30 WIB

=== Kompas Sport ===
- Weekdays, 23.00 WIB - 23.30 WIB

=== Kompas Sport Weekend ===
- Weekends, 12.30 WIB - 13.00 WIB

=== Kompas Sepekan ===
- Weekend, 17.30 WIB - 18.00 WIB

=== Kompas Update ===
- Everyday, twelve or thirteen times a day (08.00 WIB - 23.00 WIB)

=== Kilas Kompas ===
- Everyday, 23.30 WIB - 00.00 WIB

=== Kompas Breaking News ===
- Everyday, Often (Kompas's Youtube broadcast)

== Sponsors ==
- Aquviva Kompas Siang
- Luwak White Koffee Kompas Petang
- Top Coffee Kompas Malam

== See also ==
- Liputan 6
- Kompas TV § Presenters
