= Ira Koesno =

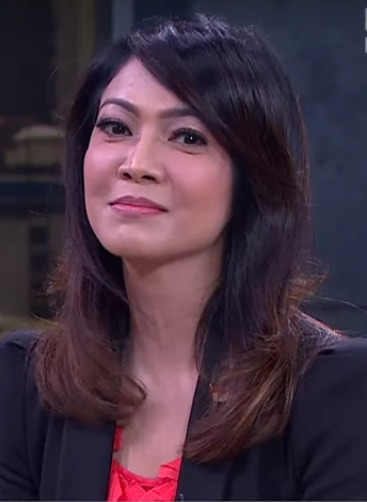
- Born: Dwi Noviratri Martoatmodjo; November 30, 1969 (age 56); Jakarta, Indonesia
- Education: University of Indonesia
- Occupation: TV presenters
- Years active: 1996–present
- Parents: Koesno Martoatmodjo (father); Sri Utami (mother)

Dwi Noviratri Martoatmodjo (born November 30, 1969), which is better known as Ira Koesno, is an Indonesian Communication Strategist, Public Relations (PR) & Media Practitioner, former television journalist/anchor, former broadcast auditor on Liputan 6, SCTV.

== Early life ==
Ira is the daughter of Koesno Martoatmodjo and Sri Utami. After completing her studies at Economic Faculty, University of Indonesia, She worked at a public accounting firm when she was aged 25. A year later, in 1996, she applied for a job at SCTV as a journalist. Ira earned a Master of Arts degree in Film and Television Production at University of Bristol in 2000, and earned a Master of Arts in International Journalism from the University of Westminster a year later.

== Career ==
Ira currently owns a Communication Strategy company (crisis management, campaigns, and marketing communications) with Oktofin RDB as Partner and Indiarto Priadi as Associate. The company, named irakoesnocommunications (IKComm), has served a wide range of clients, from government agencies and state-owned enterprises to private companies.

Toward the end of the New Order regime, Ira, as a journalist for SCTV, interviewed Sarwono Kusumaatmadja, then Minister of State for the Environment. In the interview, Sarwono used the term cabut gigi (pulling out teeth), referring to President Suharto's demand for his resignation. This incident led to her being summoned by SCTV officials and ordered to refrain from journalistic activities for several days. In 2003, Ira decided to take a break from the world of television and set up a business in the field of communication strategy services., Ira Koesno Production (IKPro). On January 13, 2017, she was appointed as moderator in the first round of the first debate of the 2017 Jakarta Gubernatorial Election. On April 12, 2017, she again moderated the second round of the 2017 Jakarta Gubernatorial Election. On January 17, 2019, she was again appointed as moderator in the first debate of the 2019 Presidential and Vice Presidential Candidates (with Imam Priyono).
