= Tadjus Sobirin =

Indonesian politician

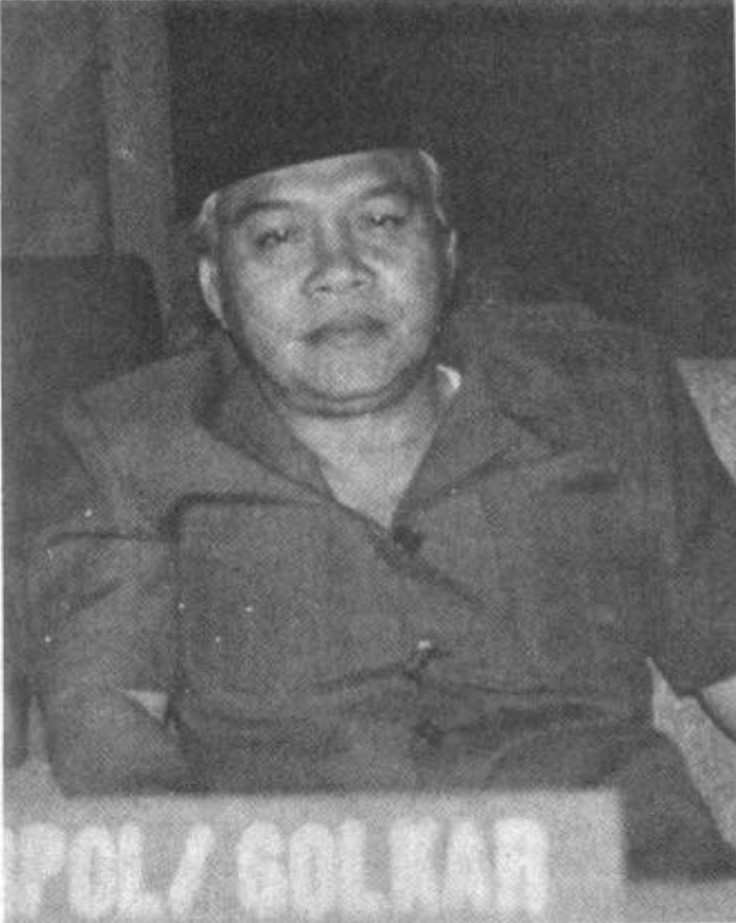
- Sobirin, c. 1993–94

Regent of Tangerang
- In office 14 March 1983 – 14 March 1993
- Preceded by: M. Syukur
- Succeeded by: Syaifullah Abdulrachman

Personal details
- Born: 2 February 1940 (age 86) Cirebon, Dutch East Indies

Military service
- Branch/service: Indonesian Army
- Years of service: 1964–1993
- Rank: Major general

Tadjus Sobirin (born 2 February 1940) is an Indonesian former military officer and politician who was the regent of Tangerang Regency between 1983 and 1993.

== Biography ==
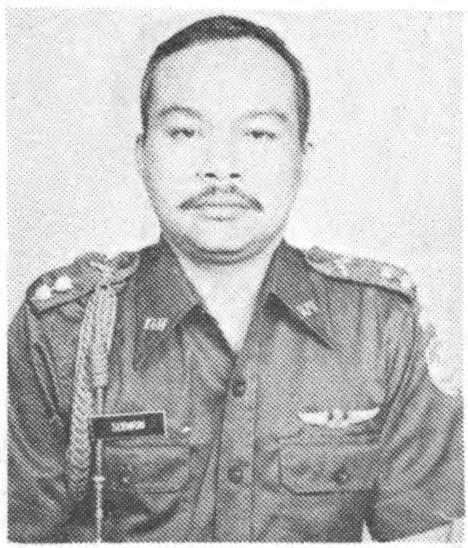
Tadjus Sobirin as the commander of the South Jakarta military district.

Sobirin was born in Cirebon, West Java, on 2 February 1940. He enrolled at the Indonesian Military Academy in Magelang, graduating in 1964 and being assigned to the cavalry units of the Indonesian Army.

He was sworn in as Tangerang's regent in March 1983. During one occasion in 1984, Sobirin personally beat up a policeman who were restricting entry for his motorcade into an unopened toll road. Due to this incident, there were reports that the Armed Forces considered to revoke his rank, but no such penalties occurred. His policies as regent included the implementation of a waste retribution fee for all households in the regency, and the development of the planned area Bumi Serpong Damai within the regency.

At the end of his tenure on 14 March 1993, the municipal council failed to elect the next regent on time, and hence his term was slightly extended. Following the expiry of his term, he was appointed by the armed forces commander as expert staff for economic and financial affairs. Sobirin retired from the armed forces with the rank of brigadier general in November 1993 and was subsequently elected as chairman for Golkar's Jakarta branch. He held the position until 2001 when he resigned. He also served within the Jakarta Regional People's Representative Council, and was a delegate to the People's Consultative Assembly representing Jakarta. Following the fall of Suharto, Sobirin called for then-chairman of Golkar Harmoko to step down, saying that Harmoko had betrayed Suharto by asking for the latter to resign the presidency. Suharto later resign and was replaced by Habibie. Several days after his ascension to power, Habibie gave Tadjus an honorary promotion to the rank of major general along with several other Golkar branch chairman.

As of 2019, Sobirin remained involved in Golkar's politics.
