= Intisari =

Indonesian magazine

- Editor-in-Chief: Jakoeb Oetama (1963-1995); Liliek Oetama (1997-2013); Mahandis Yoanata Thamrin (2014-2024)
- Categories: General Interest
- Frequency: Monthly (1963-2024); Online (2024-present)
- Format: Digest
- Circulation: 7,000 (2024)
- Publisher: Grid Network
- Founder: P.K. Ojong and Jakob Oetama
- First issue: August 17, 1963; 62 years ago
- Final issue Number: June 2024 (print); 741
- Company: Kompas Gramedia
- Country: Indonesia
- Based in: Jl. Gelora VII, Tanah Abang, Jakarta
- Language: Indonesian
- Website: intisari.grid.id
- ISSN: 0535-4900

Intisari (Digest) is an Indonesian general-interest online media owned by Kompas Gramedia via its specific interest magazine and online subsidiary Grid Network. It was previously a monthly magazine published since 1963 to 2024. The magazine has a format similar to that of Reader's Digest.

== History ==
Intisari was first published in 1963 by Petrus Kanisius Ojong (1920–1980) and Jakob Oetama (1931–2020), with assistance from J. Adi Subrata and Irawati. It was the company's first publication.

Intisari was intended to open the horizons of Indonesian society. Its first edition had no cover and was 14 x 17.5 cm in size, in black and white and 128 pages thick. In its first publication, 11,000 copies were printed. Later editions would reach 350,000 copies.

The online version of Intisari includes a variety of sections and categories, such as finance, career, unique, inspiration, wellness, and travelling.

The magazine was published the last issue in June 2024. Intisari magazine in print form is still published in special editions and at certain moments.

== Taglines ==
- Inspirasi Setiap Generasi (2009-2011)
- Smart and Inspiring (2012–present)
