= Gading Serpong =

Planned township in Tangerang Regency, Indonesia

Coordinates: 6.243°S 106.629°E

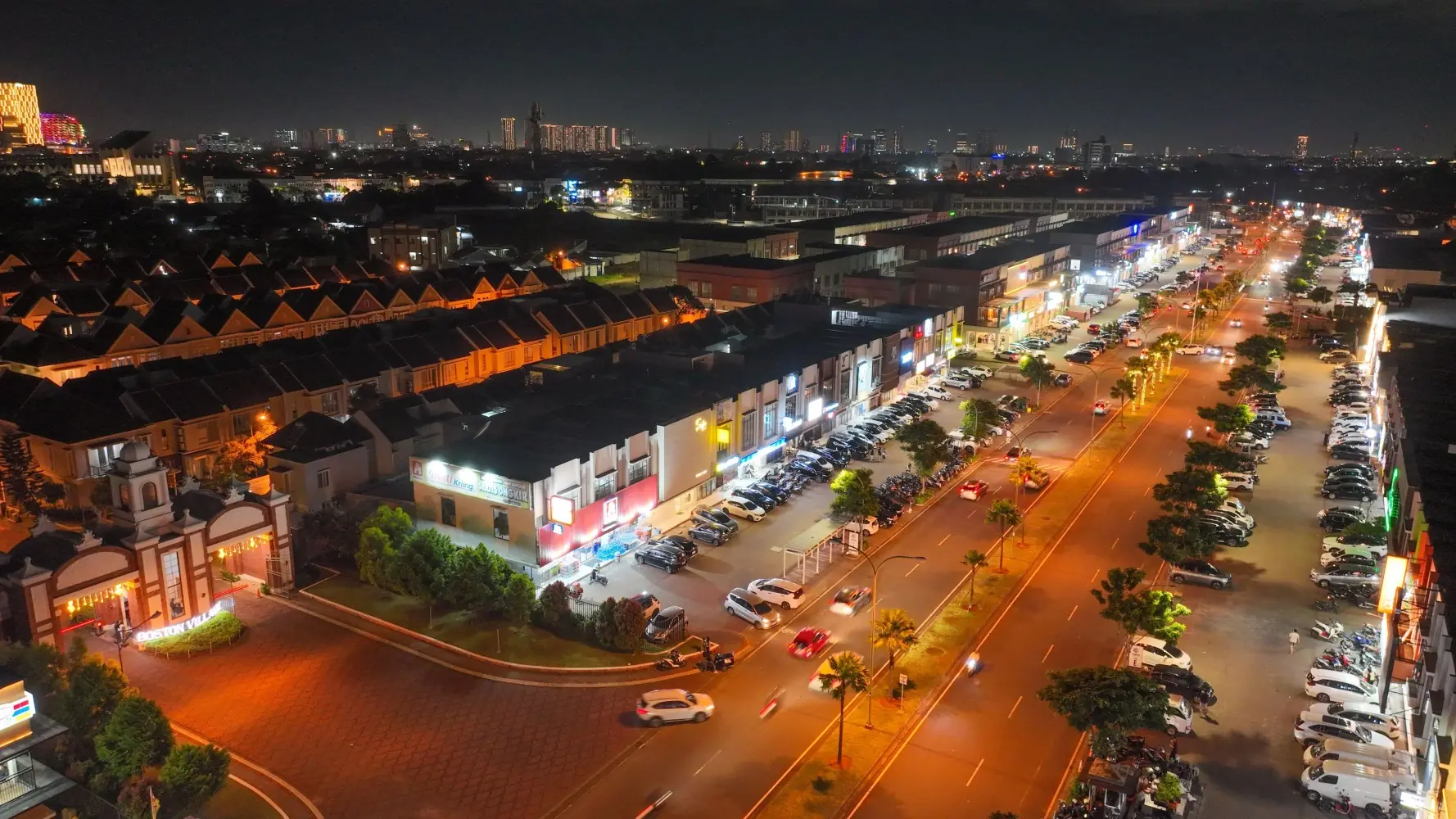
- Aniva and Madison Gading Serpong Areas
- Interactive map of Gading Serpong
- Other names: Summarecon Serpong; Paramount Serpong; GS
- Location: Kelapa Dua, Tangerang Regency, Banten, Indonesia

Companies
- Developer: Summarecon Serpong (PT Summarecon Agung Tbk); Paramount Land (PT Paramount Enterprise International)
- Planner: PT Jakarta Baru Cosmopolitan (joint venture of PT Summarecon Agung and Batik Keris Group)

Technical details
- Size: 1,500 hectares

Gading Serpong is a planned township at Kelapa Dua and Pagedangan districts of Tangerang Regency, Banten, Indonesia, 21 km west of the capital city Jakarta. With a total area of 1,500 hectares, Gading Serpong is one of the elite planned satellite cities in Western Greater Jakarta (South Tangerang and Tangerang Regency), adjacent to Lippo Karawaci to the west, BSD City to the south, and Alam Sutera to the east.

Since the township is co-developed, Gading Serpong consists of two main area, Summarecon Serpong (for area developed by PT Summarecon Agung Tbk) and Paramount Serpong (for area developed by PT Paramount Enterprise International or Paramount Land). However, it is often still refereed as Gading Serpong or shortened to GS.

== History ==
The township development started in 1998 by PT Jakarta Baru Cosmopolitan (JBC), which is a joint venture by Keris Group (who is known for their Batik Keris brand) and a reputable developer, Summarecon.

In 2004, to accelerate the development of Gading Serpong, Summarecon and Keris Group agreed to dissolve JBC, and separate the JBC's area equally, for each develop and manage their own respective area. The Summaercon part is known as Summarecon Serpong, while the Keris Group area was then known as Ambassador Gading Serpong. Both of the companies do not view each other as competitor, since both companies has a different view on development strategy.

In 2006, Ambassador Gading Serpong is taken over by Paramount Lake, and rename the area as Paramount Land.

Currently, development in Gading Serpong is being carried out by two developers, namely Paramount Land and Summarecon Agung.

== Educational facilities ==
Universities and Higher education

- Multimedia Nusantara University
- Pradita University
- Matana University
- Bunda Mulia School of Hospitality (formerly LaSalle College Jakarta – BSD branch)
- International European University (IEU) – Gading Serpong Campus
- Binus @Serpong (BINUS School Serpong)

International & National Plus Schools

- SPH – Sekolah Pelita Harapan Gading Serpong
- BINUS School Serpong
- Global Islamic School Gading Serpong
- Stella Maris School
- Tunas Bangsa Christian School (TBCS)
- BPK Penabur Gading Serpong

Regular National Private Schools

- SMAK Penabur Gading Serpong – Ranked one of the top private high schools in Tangerang
- Sekolah Tarakanita
- Sekolah Santa Ursula BSD (nearby)
- Sekolah Islam Al-Azhar BSD (nearby but relevant)

Public Schools (Negeri)

- SMA Negeri 1 Kelapa Dua
- SMP Negeri 3 Kelapa Dua
- SD Negeri Bojong Nangka (Multiple Branches)

Courses, Bootcamps & Learning Centers

- Kumon, Ganesha Operation, Primagama
- English First (EF), Wall Street English
- Coding Bootcamps & Robotics Clubs (e.g. Robotic Explorer, LOGIQUE)
- Music Schools & Art Studios

== Transport ==
Gading Serpong has direct access to Jakarta-Merak Toll Road and Jakarta Outer Ring Road. Transjakarta operates one premium feeder bus route known as "Royaltrans" from inside the township to Jakarta: route S14 (Summarecon Serpong–Lebak Bulus). Serpong, Rawa Buntu, Cisauk and Jatake stations of Jakarta Commuter Rail is located close to the township, to be precise located within BSD City in the south.

Gading Serpong will be served by the Jakarta MRT East–West Line plan, spanning from Cikarang in the east to Balaraja on the west, passing through the northern area of Gading Serpong along the Jakarta-Merak toll road. This line is set to enhance connectivity and ease of transportation for the residents and commuters in these regions.

== See also ==
Other townships nearby Gading Serpong:

- BSD City
- Alam Sutera
- Lippo Karawaci
