= Kawanku (magazine) =

Indonesian magazine

- Editor-in-chief: Trinzi Mulamawitri
- Categories: Teenage girls
- Frequency: Weekly (1970-2008); Biweekly (2008-2016)
- Publisher: Kompas Gramedia
- Founded: 5 August 1970
- Final issue: 21 December 2016
- Company: PT. Primamedia Kawanku
- Country: Indonesia
- Based in: Jakarta
- Language: Bahasa Indonesia, English
- Website: www.cewekbanget.id

Kawanku (My Friend) was an Indonesian weekly magazine for teenage girls. It was first published in 1970 as a children's magazine. Kawanku focused on fashion and celebrities and offered information about the latest entertainment and feature stories on current issues and events. The magazine was published by Kompas Gramedia. Its headquarters was in Jakarta.

== Taglines ==
- Pasti Tau Yang Cewek Mau (1993-2009)
- Unbeatable Fun Girl (2009-2015)
- Cewek Banget (2016)

== Website Revision ==
Before Kawanku magazine was stop publishing with Prilly Latuconsina last cover, a new website CewekBanget.id has launched in January 2017.
