= Rosianna Silalahi =

Indonesian news presenter

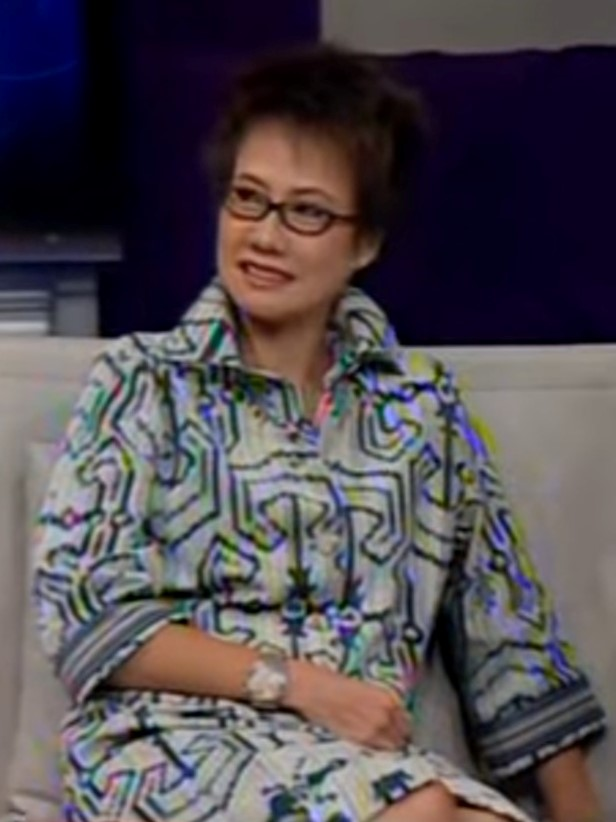
- Rosi in 2011
- Born: Rosianna Magdalena Silalahi; September 26, 1972 (age 53); Pangkal Pinang, Bangka Belitung, Indonesia
- Occupation: Journalist
- Years active: 1998–present

Rosianna Magdalena Silalahi (born September 26, 1972), also known as Rosi, is an Indonesian news presenter and former editor-in-chief of Liputan 6 SCTV. She is currently the editor-in-chief of the news channel Kompas TV.

== Career ==
Youngest of the five children of L.M. Silalahi and Ida Hutapea, Rosi was involved in journalism from an early age. While attending Santa Ursula High School, Silalahi participated in a wall magazine extracurricular activity and was active in a school magazine, Serviant.

Rosi failed to be accepted at the FISIP Communication Department of the University of Indonesia (UI) and was accepted into her second choice, Department of Japanese Literature, Faculty of Literature at UI.

After obtaining a bachelor's degree, Rosi sent a job application to TVRI. Having worked at an advertising company for several months, Rosi was called to undergo tests on TVRI and was accepted as a reporter. In 1998, she began working at Liputan 6 SCTV first as a reporter, then a year later began to make additional appearances as a news reader.

Rosi was promoted after Ira Koesno and Arief Suditomo left SCTV. She was one of six Asian TV journalists who interviewed US President George Bush at the White House in 2003 and received the title Host of Favorite Talk Show and News Event Carrier / Current Affair of the Panasonic Award in 2004. During the 2004 Election, Silalahi produced Kotak Suara, a program discussing money and politics so she won the "Indonesia Journalist Board" award that year. She was awarded the 2005 Panasonic News Presenter award and in November of that year, became editor-in-chief of Liputan 6.

Rosi married Dino Gregory Izaak at the Cathedral Church, Lapangan Banteng, Central Jakarta on July 30, 2005.

In 2007, Rosi again won the title of Favorite Favorite News / Current Affair at the Panasonic Award.

From September 1, 2014, Rosi joined Kompas TV, overseeing the TV newsroom as editor-in-chief, replacing Kompas senior journalist, Taufik Mihardja.
