= Tribun Network =

Indonesian newspaper chain

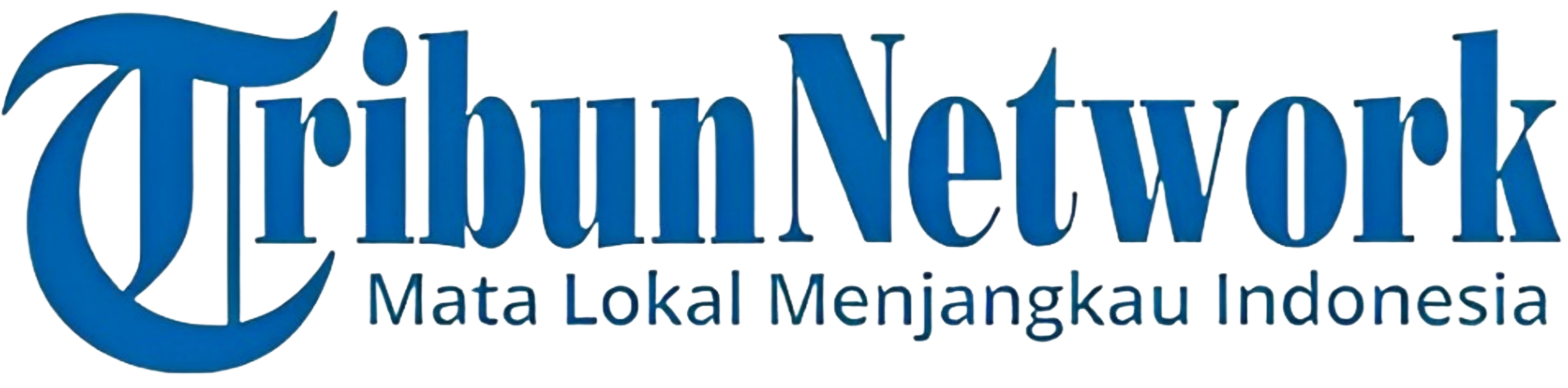
Tribun Network logo

Tribun Network is a newspaper chain and online news outlet in Indonesia owned by Kompas Gramedia. The group owns 22 local newspapers and one national newspaper across 24 cities and regencies in Indonesia.

== History ==
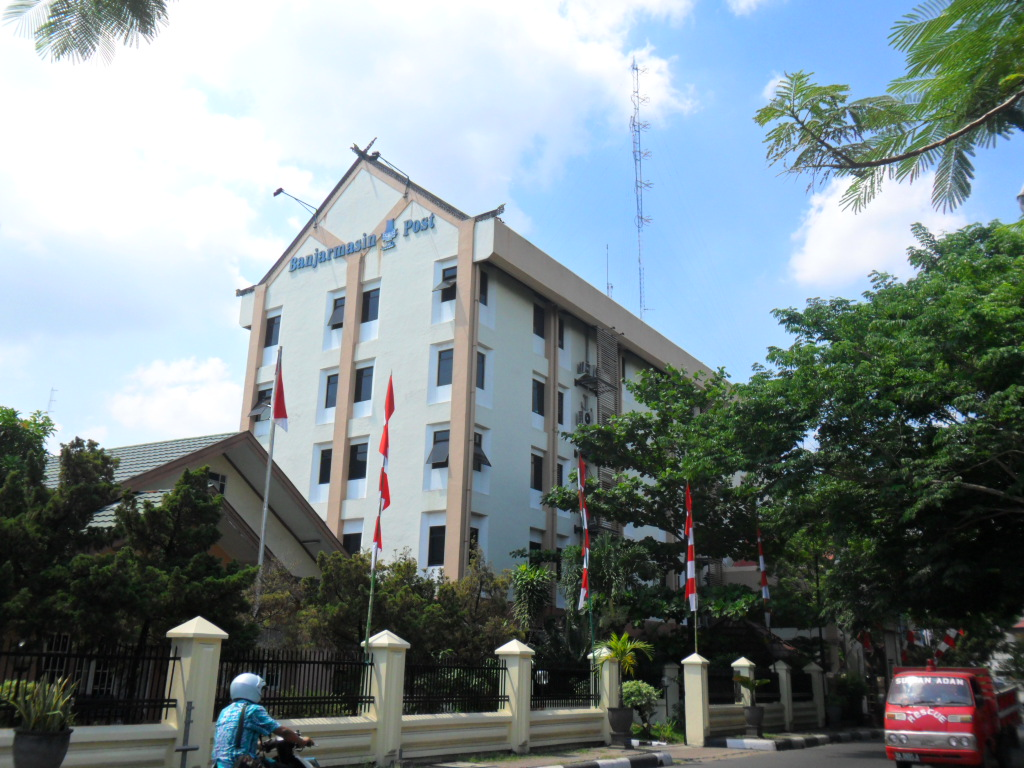
The headquarters of Banjarmasin Post in Banjarmasin, a part of Tribun Network

In the late 1980s, the Department of Information asked major newspapers to assist minor local newspapers that were hampered by press permit (SIUPP) issues. The government restricted advertising space to 30% of all content for newspapers not aiding minor newspapers.

In 1987, Kompas Gramedia acquired the Sriwijaya Post in Palembang and established the subsidiary PT Indopersda Primamedia (Persda) to assist regional newspapers in need. In 1988, the company acquired Mimbar Swadaya, a weekly newspaper in Banda Aceh—rebranding it as Serambi Indonesia—and Surya, a weekly newspaper in Surabaya that began publishing daily. Kompas Gramedia acquired the daily Pos Kupang in 1992 and the Banjarmasin Post in 1994.

Persda later strengthened its business by publishing its own regional newspapers in other cities under the Tribun brand. The first newspaper to hold the brand, Tribun Kaltim, was published in Balikpapan in 2003, followed by Tribun Timur (Makassar) and Tribun Jabar (Bandung), among others.

In 2010, Persda rebranded as Tribun Network and launched the unified online portal Tribunnews.com.

In 2014, Tribun Network published a nationally oriented sports newspaper, Super Ball, as a spin-off of the football sections of its members' newspapers. Its online portal, which was originally a subdomain of Tribunnews.com, is currently a subdomain of Bolasport.com.

== List of newspapers ==
Name	Locale	Notes
Serambi Indonesia	Banda Aceh, Aceh	
Tribun Medan	Medan, North Sumatra	
Tribun Pekanbaru	Pekanbaru, Riau	
Tribun Batam	Batam, Riau Islands	
Tribun Jambi	Jambi, Jambi	
Sriwijaya Post	Palembang, South Sumatra	
Tribun Sumsel	Palembang, South Sumatra	
Bangka Pos	Pangkalpinang, Bangka Belitung	
Pos Belitung	Tanjung Pandan, Bangka Belitung	
Tribun Lampung	Bandar Lampung, Lampung	
Tribun Jakarta	Special Capital Region of Jakarta	Digital publication, now defunct
Warta Kota	Special Capital Region of Jakarta	
Tribun Jabar	Bandung, West Java	
Tribun Jateng	Semarang, Central Java	
Tribun Jogja	Yogyakarta, Special Region of Yogyakarta	
Surya	Surabaya, East Java	
Tribun Pontianak	Pontianak, West Kalimantan	
Tribun Kaltim	Balikpapan, East Kalimantan	
Banjarmasin Post	Banjarmasin, South Kalimantan	
Tribun Timur	Makassar, South Sulawesi	
Tribun Manado	Manado, North Sulawesi	
Tribun Bali	Gianyar, Bali	
Pos Kupang	Kupang, East Nusa Tenggara	
Super Ball	Special Capital Region of Jakarta	National sports newspaper

== Online news ==
Tribunnews.com
- Website type: News website
- Available in: Indonesian
- Owner: Tribun Network (Kompas Gramedia Group)
- Website: www.tribunnews.com
- Commercial: Yes
- Launched: 22 March 2010; 16 years ago
- Current status: Active

Tribunnews.com is Tribun Network's online news portal, with the chain's newspapers publishing via subdomains.

In 2018, Tribunnews.com was the most popular nationally hosted website in Indonesia, averaging 183.2 million visits per month. It was 38th in the world's most popular websites by traffic as of April 16, 2020.

In January 2019, Tribunnews.com was among the seven Indonesian online media outlets with the highest viewership, reaching 150 million Indonesians, or 56% of the population.

=== Criticism ===
In 2023, the Makassar branch of the website, Tribun Timur, and its associated YouTube channel were criticized by BBC Monitoring and the Indonesian watchdog Remotivi for their pro-Russian coverage of the Russian invasion of Ukraine.
