= Multimedia Nusantara University =

Private university in Indonesia

Coordinates: 6.2567°S 106.6182°E

- Universitas Multimedia Nusantara
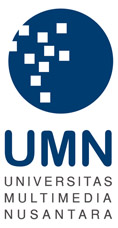
- Type: Private University
- Established: 20 November 2006
- Parent institution: Kompas Gramedia Group
- Chairman: Ir. Teddy Surianto
- Rector: Ir. Andrey Andoko, M.Sc., Ph.D
- Location: Tangerang, Indonesia
- Campus: Scientia Garden, Gading Serpong
- Colors: Blue
- Website: www.umn.ac.id

Multimedia Nusantara University (Indonesian: Universitas Multimedia Nusantara, abbreviated as UMN) is a private university located in Gading Serpong, Tangerang, Banten, Indonesia. The university was founded by Kompas Gramedia Group on 25 November 2005 and officially launched in a ceremony at the Hotel Santika, Jakarta on 20 November 2006.

== History ==
Multimedia Nusantara University had been established on the initiative of Dr. (HC) Jakob Oetama, the founder of Kompas Gramedia. The initiative was then come into realisation by works among the leaders of Kompas Gramedia, namely: Agung Adiprasetyo (CEO), Ir. Teddy Surianto (Business Development), the ranks of Kompas Gramedia Board of Directors and the Founding Committee, led by Dr. Ir. P.M. Winarno, M.Kom. (Chairman) and Ir. Y. Budi Susanto, M.M. (Vice Chairman). Furthermore, on November 25, 2005, UMN of operational permits issued by the Minister of National Education Republic of Indonesia and on November 20, 2006, and officially launched in a ceremony at the Hotel Santika, Jakarta. The ceremony was inaugurated by Dr. Ir. Dodi Nandika Secretary General of the Ministry of National Education.

Being relatively new, UMN had conferred degrees to its first batch of graduates on Saturday, 26 November 2011, with the appearance of Minister for Tourism and Creative Economy, Mari Elka Pangestu, who gave speech on this occasion. Two bachelors from the first batch were given international scholarships to continue with their studies by Tokyo Denki University Japan and Universiti Tunku Abdul Rahman Malaysia, with a full-tuition scholarship for these talented bachelors. In the other hand, almost 80% of the first UMN graduates has been welcomed and accepted in various professional working fields.

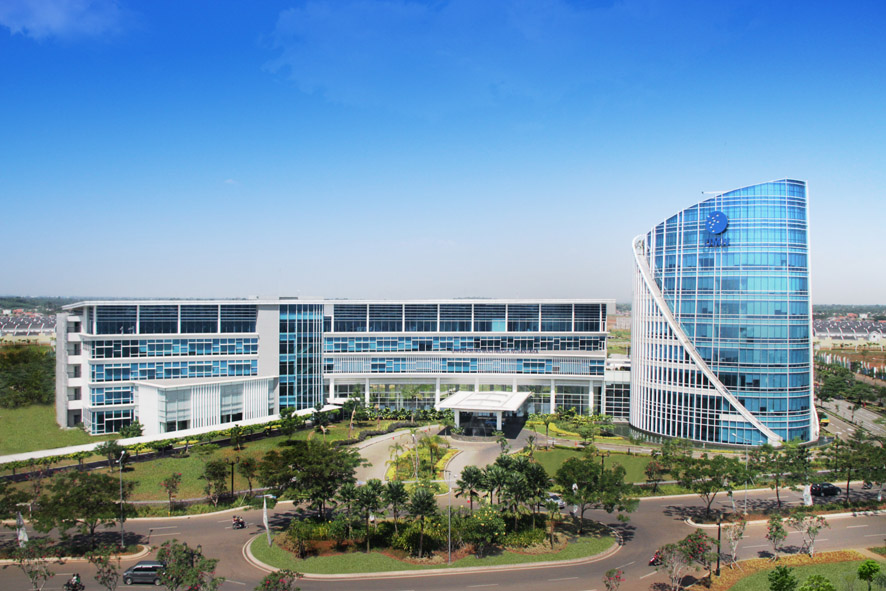
Multimedia Nusantara University.

== Faculties ==
- Faculty of Business
- Faculty of Information and Technology
- Faculty of Communication
- Faculty of Art and Design

== Facilities ==
=== Administrative Buildings ===
==== Original Campus: Rectorate & Classrooms ====
The UMN campus was inaugurated on December 2, 2009 with its original layout which included the classroom building and rectorate. The university's main entrance is located on the North side of the classroom building, with the main lobby located in the atrium between the two buildings.

==== New Campus: Raih Juara 1 ====
UMN's New Media Tower - 'Raih Juara 1' - is a 12-storey eco-friendly building that was inaugurated on September 8, 2012. The building - whose energy-saving features were designed by the energy efficiency consultancy Synergy Efficiency Solutions - was awarded the title of 'Most Energy Efficient New Building' in the 2013 National Energy Efficiency Awards.

==== Dormitories ====
The dormitories consists of three buildings: Building A (specifically for men), Building B and Building C (specifically for women). Each building contains two types of rooms: either single or double occupancy. Each room contains all accessories necessary for basic student life (beds, wardrobes, etc.). The dormitory buildings are also equipped with their own parking facilities, lounges with TVs, and welcome lobbies.

=== Educational Facilities ===
==== Photo Studio ====
The UMN photography studio is equipped with the newest professional equipment. Students can take advantage of high-resolution digital SLR cameras with a wide arrange of lenses. Also available are backdrops, professional lighting with flash triggers, umbrellas, softboxes, snoots, barn doors, filters, honeycombs, and much more. The photo studio is used for lectures, workmanship coursework, research, and a final projects.

==== TV Studio ====
The TV studios can be adapted to the needs of various media courses - both live and recorded television, news and entertainment. Tools available include teleprompters (screen monitor that displays texts to the presenter), Character Generator (computer graphics viewer and text on the television screen), a switcher (equipment to transfer images from one camera to another camera), and more.

==== Radio Studio ====
The radio study broadcasts daily via 107.7 FM (also accessible via online streaming at www.radio.umn.ac.id). The broadcast starts at eight in the morning until five in the afternoon, Monday to Saturday. Radio UMN is driven by students with a variety of quality programs such as Gogo Archipelago (program-me discussing cultural diversity in Indonesia), Serpong First, and Talk n Easy (discussing the successful young Indonesians).

==== Laboratories ====
Designed to accommodate a wide array of disciplines taught at UMN, labs are equipped with the necessary hardware and software to support the learning experience. The facility includes Game Development Lab, Artificial Intelligence Lab, Mobile Development Lab, Database System Lab, Certified Ethical Hacker Lab, Applied Network Computer Lab, Electronic Workshop Lab, Industry Automation Lab, Electronics Design Lab, Thermal & Fluids Science Laboratory, Big Data Lab and Basic Physics Laboratory for the faculty of Information and Technology; Newsroom, TV Studio, Collaboration Hub, FGD Room, Collaboration Space, Photography Studio and Radio Station for the Faculty of Communication; Skystar Ventures, UMN Tax Center, F&B Lab, Front Office Lab, Housekeeping Lab and Kitchen Lab for the Faculty of Business; while for the Faculty of Art and Design, there are Architecture Studio, Photography Studio, Green Screen Studio, Rendering Farm, Cinema Screening, Printing Lab, Sound Lab and Game Design Lab.

==== Library ====
Occupies an area of 600m2, UMN library has over 20,000 printed collection including course books, reference books, science texts, and magazines (domestic and foreign) - all equipped with RFID technology. The library also provides Knowledge Center, Discussion Rooms, Netflix services dan Reference Assistance. E-journals such as IEEE and Proquest are available, as well as the internally published journal such as Ultimart and Ultima InfoSys.

=== Sports Facilities ===
UMN's sports facilities include outdoor basketball and badminton courts and indoor soccer courts. These facilities are adaptable to various sports including martial arts, hockey, yoga, and more.

== Graduates ==
Multimedia Nusantara University has opened its new student's admission since the 2007 academic cohort. The inaugural lecture of the first batch was held on September 3, 2007, with the theme "Human Resource Development to Meet the ICT Era." In order to make the inaugural lecture a success, UMN invited guest lecturers such as Prof. Dr. Ir. Mohamad Nuh (Then Minister of Communication and Information), Dr(Hc) Jakob Oetama (Founder of Kompas Gramedia), Roy Suryo (Telematics Expert), Dra. Puspita Zorawar, M.PsiT (Communication and Psychology Expert).

Initially, it opened 7 study programmes (Management, Accounting, Information System, Informatics, Computer Engineering, Strategic Communication, and Visual Design Communication), but in 2016 it opened 4 more programmes (Electronics Engineering, Engineering Physics, Architecture, and Film), 2 more in 2017 (Hospitality and Journalism), 1 in 2019 (Master of Technology Management), 1 in 2021 (Strategic Communication by Distance Learning), and one more (Master of Communication Science) in preparation to the total of 16 study programmes.

Number of graduates per study programme
No	Study Programme	1st Graduation	2nd Graduation	3rd Graduation	4th Graduation	5th Graduation	6th Graduation	7th Graduation	8th Graduation	9th graduation	10th Graduation	Total
Date	-	26 11 2011	24 11 2012	18 05 2013	30 11 2013	07 06 2014	29 11 2014	30 05 2015	30 11 2015	04 06 2016	17 12 2016	-
1	Management	3	23	19	21	31	36	0	0	0	0	0
2	Accounting	6	13	46	31	60	22	0	0	0	0	0
3	Information System	3	13	14	34	18	41	0	0	0	0	0
4	Informatics	17	38	9	44	34	66	0	0	0	0	0
5	Computer Engineering	5	3	2	2	2	11	0	0	0	0	0
6	Strategic Communication	25	54	23	149	87	113	0	0	0	0	0
7	Visual Design Communication	16	50	22	157	47	223	0	0	0	0	0
-	Total	75	192	135	438	279	512	370	527	314	542	3384

== Notable people ==
- Anggi Marito (Singer)
- Audrey Tapiheru (Singer)
- Chandra Liow (Actor and Director)
- Gamaliel Tapiheru (Singer, Songwriter)
- Gritte Agatha (Actress, YouTuber)
- Kristo Immanuel (Actor, Impressionist, Director)
- Kevin Anggara (Actor, YouTuber)
- Jonathan Reginald (Dancer)
- Aulia Rizsa Wirizqi (Content Creator)
- Tiara Andini (Singer & Actress)
- Hasyakyla Utami (Actress, Singer, Dancer)
- Nadia Soekarno (Actress, Model, Journalist, News Anchor)
