= Benny & Mice =

Benny & Mice was an Indonesian comic strip made by Benny Rachmadi and Muhammad "Mice" Misrad.

== Background ==
Benny & Mice first appeared in 2003 in the Sunday edition of the Kompas newspaper. The comic strip features Benny as tall and frizzy-haired, while Mice has glasses and a big nose. Each comic strip has a different title picture which always resembles Benny and Mice.

The final Benny & Mice newspaper comic strip was published on 4 July 2010. The following week (11 July 2010), it was replaced by Mice Cartoon drawn solo by Muhammad "Mice" Misrad. Benny Rachmadi remains a working cartoonist despite the end of his partnership with Muhammad Misrad.

== Comic Books ==
Benny & Mice comic strips are also published as comic books:

- Kartun Benny & Mice: Jakarta Luar Dalem (Benny & Mice Cartoon: Jakarta Inside Out) (2007)
- Benny & Mice: Talk About Hape (Benny & Mice: Talk About Mobile Phones) (March 2008)
- Kartun Benny & Mice: Jakarta Atas Bawah (Benny & Mice Cartoon: Jakarta Up and Down) (September 2008)
- Benny & Mice: Lost In Bali (December 2008)
- Benny & Mice: Lost in Bali 2 (July 2009)
