= International University Liaison Indonesia =

Indonesian university

International University Liaison Indonesia (IULI)
- Universitas Lintas Internasional Indonesia
- Motto: Growing With Excelance
- Type: Private University
- Established: 2014
- Rector: Dr. Christin Agustina Purba, M.Si
- Location: Tangerang,, Banten, 15332, Indonesia
- Campus: Iuli Campus Gading Serpong
- Colors: Navy Blue
- Mascot: Klauss the Owl
- Website: iuli.ac.id
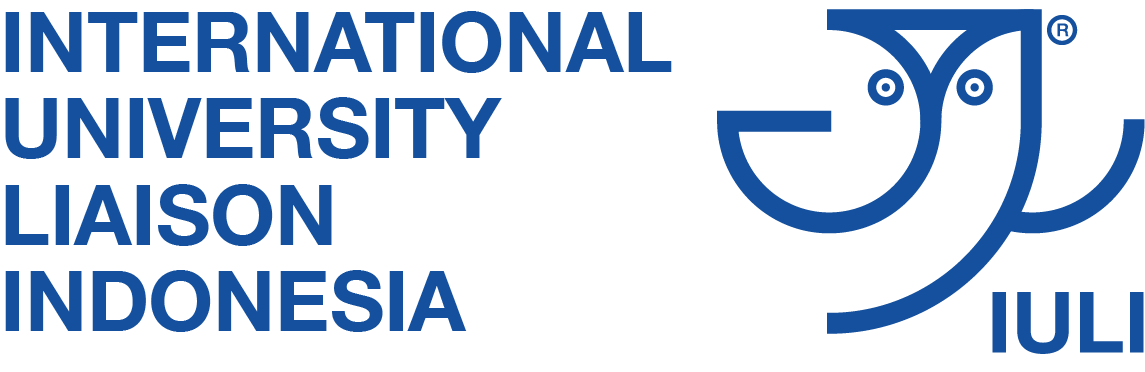

Universitas Lintas Internasional Indonesia (IULI), internationally known as the International University Liaison Indonesia, is a private university in Indonesia established in 2014. The university offers academic programs in engineering and technology; economics, business, and social sciences; as well as dentistry and health sciences.

IULI is currently operated by Yayasan Pendidikan Prima Internasional and is located in Gading Serpong, Tangerang Regency, Banten, Indonesia.}

== History ==
Universitas Lintas Internasional Indonesia (IULI) was established in 2014. Dr.-Ing. Ilham Akbar Habibie, MBA was among the figures involved in the establishment and early development of the university. From its early years, IULI was developed with an international orientation and academic cooperation with higher education institutions outside Indonesia.

The establishment of IULI was authorized through Decree of the Minister of Education and Culture of the Republic of Indonesia No. 425/E/O/2014 concerning the establishment of Universitas Lintas Internasional Indonesia in South Tangerang, Banten. At the time of its establishment, the university was operated by Yayasan International University Liaison Indonesia.

=== Change of management and institutional development ===
In 2025, IULI underwent a change in institutional management. Under Decree of the Minister of Higher Education, Science, and Technology of the Republic of Indonesia No. 1168/B/O/2025, the management of Universitas Lintas Internasional Indonesia was transferred from Yayasan International University Liaison Indonesia to Yayasan Pendidikan Prima Internasional. The decree was issued on 22 December 2025 and took effect on the date of its issuance.

Following the change in management, IULI continued its institutional and academic development and relocated its campus activities to Gading Serpong, Tangerang Regency, Banten.

As part of its academic development, IULI expanded into dentistry and health sciences through the Faculty of Dentistry and Health Sciences, which includes the Bachelor's Program in Dentistry, the Professional Dentist Program, and the Bachelor's Program in Physiotherapy. These programs complement the university's existing academic fields under the Faculty of Engineering and Technology and the Faculty of Economics, Business and Social Sciences.

== Academics ==
IULI organizes its academic programs through three faculties.

=== Faculty of Engineering and Technology ===
The Faculty of Engineering and Technology offers undergraduate programs in:

- Electrical Engineering
- Industrial Engineering
- Informatics Engineering
- Chemical Engineering
- Aviation Engineering
- Food Technology

=== Faculty of Economics, Business and Social Sciences ===
The Faculty of Economics, Business and Social Sciences offers undergraduate programs in:

- Business Administration
- International Relations
- Management
- Hospitality and Tourism Management

=== Faculty of Dentistry and Health Sciences ===
The Faculty of Dentistry and Health Sciences offers programs in:

- Bachelor of Dentistry
- Professional Dentist Program
- Bachelor of Physiotherapy

== International orientation ==
International education has been part of IULI's academic orientation since its establishment. The university develops international academic cooperation, student mobility, and other academic activities with higher education institutions outside Indonesia.

== Campus ==
IULI's current campus is located in Gading Serpong, Tangerang Regency, Banten. The campus is located at Jalan Gading Golf Boulevard Raya Blok G/002, Cihuni, Pagedangan, Tangerang Regency, Banten 15332.

== See also ==
- List of universities in Indonesia
- Education in Indonesia

== University Partners ==
- Technische Universität Ilmenau
- Fachhochschule Erfurt
- Regensburg University of Applied Sciences
- RPTU University Kaiserslautern-Landau
- Rhine-Waal University of Applied Sciences
- University of Aalen
- Harz University of Applied Sciences
- Otto von Guericke University Magdeburg
- Karlsruhe University of Applied Sciences
- Osnabrück University of Applied Sciences
- SRH Distance learning University
- SRH University Heidelberg
- SRH Hochschule Berlin
- SRH Hochschule Nordrhein-Westfalen
- Zurich University of Applied Sciences/ZHAW
- National Formosa University
- Universitas Prima Indonesia

IULI is supported by DAAD (German Academic Exchange Service) with funds from German Federal Ministry of Education and Research
