= Nova (tabloid) =

Indonesian women's newspaper

- Sahabat Wanita Inspirasi Keluarga (Women's Friends, Family Inspiration)
- Type: Weekly newspaper
- Format: Tabloid
- Owner(s): Kompas Gramedia
- Editor-in-chief: Indhira Dian Saraswaty
- Founded: February 25, 1988
- Language: Indonesian
- Ceased publication: December 29, 2022 (print)
- Headquarters: Jl. Gelora VII, Palmerah Barat, Tanah Abang; Jakarta 10270
- Country: Indonesia
- Circulation: 4,000 (2022)
- ISSN: 0853-0300
- Website: nova.grid.id

Nova was an Indonesia women's newspaper, published in Jakarta by Kompas Gramedia. It was founded in 1988.

On 29 December 2022, the tabloid published its last issue with cover Nike Ardilla, Prilly Latuconsina, Agnez Mo, Maudy Ayunda, Lydia Kandou, Dian Sastrowardoyo, Rossa, Cinta Laura and Nikita Willy — Nova brand currently only exists in its online portal Nova.grid.id.

== Taglines ==
- Mingguan Berita Wanita (1988–2012)
- Sahabat Wanita Inspirasi Keluarga (2012–2022)
