= Bola (tabloid) =

Indonesian sports newspaper

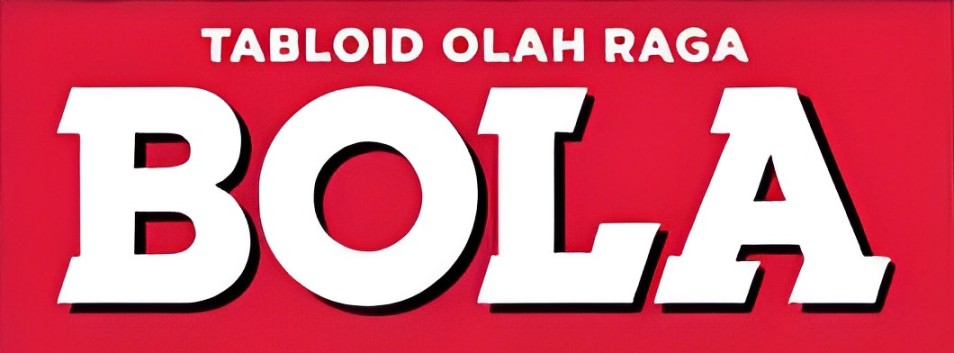
- Logo from 2009 to 2018
- Type: Weekly newspaper
- Format: Tabloid
- Owner: Kompas Gramedia
- Founder(s): Ignatius Sunito; Sumohadi Marsis
- Editor: Agung Adiprasetyo
- Founded: 3 March 1984
- Ceased publication: 26 October 2018 (print)
- Language: Indonesian
- Headquarters: Jl. Palmerah Barat 35-37; Jakarta
- Country: Indonesia
- Circulation: 25,000 (2017)
- ISSN: 0852-6729
- Website: www.bolasport.com

Bola (meaning Ball in Indonesian) is an Indonesian online sports newspaper, published in Jakarta by Kompas Gramedia. It was founded in 1984 as a pull-out section inside Kompas daily, and was then published separately. In 1997, it moved to twice editions a week (Tuesday and Friday), and in 2010 to 2013 it was published three editions a week. Issues usually had 48 pages (Monday and Thursday) and 32 pages (Saturday).

Starting 7 June 2013, Bola also published its daily version, called Harian Bola (Bola Daily). The daily was short-lived, ceased publication on 31 October 2015 and moved back to twice editions per week.

On 26 October 2018, the tabloid published its last issue. Before its final issue, Kompas Gramedia published another daily sports newspaper Super Ball (under Tribun Network newspaper chain), which was first published in 2014 and is still in publication.

== Tabloid ==
The last version of Bola covered a number of sporting competitions and events, including:

- The Indonesian Super League
- Various European Leagues and competitions, including Premier League, La Liga, Serie A, UEFA Champions League, UEFA Europa League, Bundesliga, Ligue 1 and Eredivisie
- Various international football leagues
- Formula One racing
- Grand Prix motorcycle racing
- Boxing
- Basketball
- Tennis
- Badminton
- The Olympic Games
- Various other sporting events, depending on on-going competitions

== Key People ==
- Amien Rais
- Rano Karno
- Abdurrahman Wahid

== Covers ==
List Of Football Players Appeared on Tabloid Bola

- Lionel Messi (22 March 2005, 25 November 2005, 7 March 2006, 5 December 2008, 24 January 2013, 29 April 2013, 26 September 2013, 8 January 2015, 9 July 2015, 7 January 2016, 7 March 2017, 21 March 2017)
- Gabriel Batistuta (20 November 1998, 4 May 1999, 30 May 2000, 19 January 2001, 9 February 2001, 27 April 2001, 25 May 2001, 8 February 2002, 31 January 2003)
- Alessandro Del Piero (March 1997, 2 June 1998, 24 August 1999, 5 November 1999, 25 February 2000, 12 May 2000, 31 October 2000, 23 February 2001, 28 September 2001, 16 November 2001, 25 January 2002, 13 September 2002, 15 October 2002, 26 October 2004, 11 February 2005, 14 September 2007, 23 September 2008, 3 February 2009)
- Pavel Nedvěd (7 April 2000, 5 February 2002, 8 November 2002, 18 April 2003, 31 October 2003, 30 December 2003, 19 October 2004, 17 December 2004, 1 November 2005, 11 November 2005)
- Cristiano Ronaldo (24 February 2006, 26 September 2006, 20 October 2006, 29 December 2006, 14 August 2007, 13 November 2007, 18 January 2008, 6 June 2008, 16 December 2008, 3 March 2009, 23 September 2010, 18 October 2010, 27 June 2013, 5 February 2015, 31 July 2018, 17 August 2018, 31 August 2018)
- Alessandro Nesta (7 December 1999, 15 February 2002)
- David Trezeguet (8 December 2000, 22 February 2002, 4 April 2003, 30 January 2004, 17 January 2006)
- Roberto Baggio (26 January 1999, 4 February 2000, 3 November 2000)
- Gianluigi Buffon (7 September 1999, 29 October 1999, 17 January 2003, 9 May 2003, 12 March 2004, 10 March 2016, 4 June 2016, 3 April 2018)
- Hernán Crespo (November 1997, 5 March 1999, 13 April 1999, 14 July 2000, 15 August 2000, 16 March 2001, 23 November 2001, 7 November 2003, 30 July 2004, 11 January 2005, 25 February 2005)
- Christian Vieri (26 June 1998, 27 August 1999, 7 December 2001, 8 March 2002, 11 June 2002, 10 January 2003, 11 April 2003, 25 January 2005)
- Andriy Shevchenko (8 October 1999, 26 October 1999, 8 August 2000, 30 April 2004, 27 August 2004, 6 December 2005, 27 April 2007, 25 December 2007)
- Paolo Maldini (13 March 2001, 3 August 2001, 22 November 2002, 16 September 2003)
- David Beckham (March 1997, 13 November 1998, 6 August 1999, 31 December 1999, 18 January 2002, 5 August 2003, 16 April 2004, 26 July 2005, 8 January 2010)
- Thierry Henry (14 April 2000, 21 August 2001, 15 April 2003, 26 March 2004, 23 April 2004, 10 December 2004, 29 July 2005, 10 November 2006)
- Francesco Totti (10 September 1999, 19 November 1999, 10 October 2000, 2 March 2001, 8 June 2001, 4 December 2001, 12 April 2002, 7 March 2003, 25 April 2003, 5 March 2004, 10 September 2004, 28 September 2007, 28 October 2008)
- Filippo Inzaghi (November 1997, 8 May 1998, 6 November 1998, 16 February 2001, 21 September 2001, 5 November 2002, 21 March 2003, 3 October 2003, 14 October 2005, 24 March 2006)
- Ronaldinho (25 July 2003, 12 September 2003, 19 November 2004, 22 February 2005, 25 April 2006, 5 December 2006, 20 February 2007, 11 July 2008)
- Dennis Bergkamp (18 December 1998, 10 August 1999, 26 October 1999, 5 April 2002, 20 August 2004)
- Marc Overmars (29 January 1999, 26 September 2000)
- Zinedine Zidane (May 1997, September 1997, 3 July 1998, 31 March 2000, 4 May 2001, 25 June 2004, 28 February 2006)
- Jacksen F. Tiago (November 1997)
- Sebastiano Rossi (March 1995)
- Gianluca Pagliuca (October 1996)
- Thomas Helveg (16 October 1998)
- Andrés Guglielminpietro (16 April 1999)
- Gianfranco Zola (1 October 1999)
- Pacho Rubio (11 July 2000)
- Angelo Peruzzi (8 September 2000)
- Paul Merson (16 January 2001)
- Enrico Chiesa (26 January 2001)
- Kevin Phillips (30 January 2001)
- Marco Di Vaio (2 February 2001)
- Fabien Barthez (27 February 2001)
- Sylvain Wiltord (6 March 2001)
- Steve McManaman (20 March 2001, 14 October 2003)
- Michael Owen (10 April 2001, 30 October 2001, 4 October 2002, 7 October 2003, 16 January 2004, 23 November 2004, 2 August 2005, 11 October 2005, 7 September 2007)
- Patrick Kluivert (24 April 2001, 27 February 2004)
- Giovane Élber (8 May 2001)
- Hidetoshi Nakata (11 May 2001)
- Vincent Candela (18 May 2001)
- Stefan Effenberg (17 April 2001, 22 May 2001, 24 July 2001)
- Oliver Kahn (20 November 2001, 1 October 2002, 18 October 2005)
- Jordi Cruyff (2 November 2001)
- Zé Roberto (6 November 2001)
- Oliver Bierhoff (9 November 2001)
- Robert Pires (25 December 2001, 17 October 2003)
- Nicolas Anelka (28 December 2001, 23 September 2003)
- Emmanuel Petit (31 May 2002)
- Darío Rodríguez (4 June 2002)
- Owen Hargreaves (10 September 2002)
- Rubén Baraja (11 October 2002)
- Ole Gunnar Solskjær (22 September 2000, 20 August 2002)
- Gennaro Gattuso (23 January 2001, 24 January 2003, 16 October 2009)
- Javier Zanetti (5 October 1999, 26 April 2002, 21 February 2003, 13 April 2004)
- Stefano Fiore (2 May 2003, 10 June 2003)
- Luis Figo (21 July 2000, 28 July 2000, 13 February 2001, 7 December 2004)
- Nicola Ventola (1 March 2002)
- Joe Cole (23 August 2002, 22 March 2005, 19 April 2005)
- Fabio Cannavaro (18 October 2002, 5 May 2006)
- Andrea Pirlo (22 October 2002)
- Claudio López (25 October 2002)
- Diego Forlán (1 November 2002)
- Vincenzo Montella (15 November 2002, 21 November 2003)
- John O'Shea (17 December 2002)
- Jaap Stam (13 December 2002, 4 June 2004)
- Damien Duff (21 January 2003)
- Zlatan Ibrahimović (18 March 2003)
- Edgar Davids (28 March 2003)
- Emre Belözoğlu (13 May 2003)
- Eiður Guðjohnsen (12 August 2003)
- Milan Baroš (15 August 2003)
- Tobias Rau (19 August 2003)
- Cristiano Doni (24 October 2003)
- Francesco Toldo (30 September 2003)
- Vicente Rodríguez (28 October 2003)
- Carles Puyol (14 November 2003)
- Rui Costa (12 January 2001, 27 September 2002)
- Ronaldo (3 December 2002, 1 June 2004)
- Juan Pablo Ángel (2 January 2004)
- Agustín Aranzábal (9 January 2004)
- Fredrik Ljungberg (20 January 2004)
- Mancini (23 January 2004)
- Juninho Paulista (22 August 2003, 27 January 2004)
- Patrik Berger (10 February 2004)
- Andy van der Meyde (30 March 2004)
- Santiago Cañizares (18 May 2004)
- Fernando Morientes (20 April 2004, 8 June 2004, 14 January 2005)
- Deco (29 June 2004)
- Javier Saviola (6 July 2001, 19 March 2004, 9 July 2004)
- Michael Ballack (13 November 2001, 19 November 2002, 22 June 2004, 7 September 2004, 5 April 2005, 14 June 2005)
- Didier Drogba (13 August 2004)
- Henrik Larsson (14 September 2004, 21 March 2006)
- José Mourinho (28 September 2004)
- Craig Bellamy (28 December 2004)
- Ryan Giggs (18 August 2000, 20 February 2001, 14 January 2003, 4 January 2005)
- Boaz Solossa (7 January 2005)
- Tim Howard (18 July 2003, 23 July 2004, 28 January 2005)
- Steven Gerrard (20 December 2002, 8 July 2005, 28 July 2006, 12 October 2007)
- Rio Ferdinand (3 September 2002, 4 March 2003, 23 December 2003, 17 September 2004)
- Raúl (1 May 2001, 6 September 2002)
- Juan Sebastian Verón (25 September 2001, 1 January 2002, 20 September 2002, 1 August 2003, 5 September 2003, 21 October 2003, 10 August 2004)
- Simone Inzaghi (4 November 2003)
- Luis García (15 April 2005)
- Paul Robinson (2 September 2005)
- Ruud van Nistelrooy (22 July 2003, 19 September 2003, 18 November 2003, 18 June 2004, 22 July 2005, 9 September 2005, 13 December 2005, 29 September 2006)
- Mateja Kežman (27 July 2004)
- Pauleta (29 March 2005)
- Márcio Amoroso (5 July 2005)
- Jay-Jay Okocha (19 July 2005)
- Frank Lampard (5 August 2005)
- Darren Bent (16 September 2005)
- Mido (21 October 2005)
- Harry Kewell (15 November 2005)
- Siniša Mihajlović (9 December 2005)
- Alberto Gilardino (20 December 2005)
- James Beattie (16 May 2003, 27 December 2005)
- Alex Ferguson (30 December 2005)
- Kaká (22 March 2004, 28 October 2005, 31 October 2008)
- José Antonio Reyes (3 January 2006)
- Ludovic Giuly (6 January 2006)
- Morten Gamst Pedersen (10 January 2006)
- Adrian Mutu (24 January 2006)
- Robbie Savage (30 January 2006)
- Luca Toni (7 February 2006)
- Adriano (10 February 2006)
- Sami Hyypiä (14 February 2006)
- Fernando Torres (3 March 2006)
- Julio Cruz (14 March 2006)
- Mark Viduka (23 May 2006)
- Miroslav Klose (19 July 2002, 30 May 2006, 21 November 2006)
- Bastian Schweinsteiger (10 April 2007)
- Robinho (27 January 2006, 13 April 2007)
- Carlos Tevez (29 June 2007, 8 November 2010)
- Bambang Pamungkas (13 July 2007)
- Daniele De Rossi (30 October 2007)
- Cesc Fàbregas (28 December 2007)
- Andrey Arshavin (2 September 2008)
- Gonzalo Higuaín (19 February 2010)
- Edinson Cavani (30 September 2010)
- John Terry (2 June 2011)
- Theo Walcott (20 August 2011)
- Stephan El Shaarawy (6 February 2012)

=== Special Cover ===
- Damon Hill & Michael Schumacher (November 1994)
- Ronaldo Nazario & Alessandro Del Piero (24 April 1998)
- Sonny Anderson & Luis Enrique (20 October 1998)
- Francesco Totti & Marcelo Salas (27 November 1998)
- Gabriel Batistuta & Hernan Crespo (15 December 2000)
- Ronaldo Nazario & David Trezeguet (3 May 2002)
- Juan Sebastian Verón & David Beckham (7 June 2002)
- Michael Owen & Rivaldo (21 June 2002)
- Oliver Kahn & Lee Won Jae (25 June 2002)
- Miroslav Klose & Ronaldinho (28 June 2002)
- Brazil national football team (2 July 2002, 1 July 2005)
- Paolo Maldini & Alessandro Del Piero (27 May 2003)
- Robert Pires & Thierry Henry (17 June 2003)
- David Beckham & Michael Owen (10 October 2003)
- Francesco Totti & Antonio Cassano (6 January 2004)
- Francesco Totti & Alessandro Del Piero (6 February 2004)
- Andriy Shevchenko & Christian Vieri (20 February 2004)
- Matías Almeyda & Julio Cruz (2 March 2004)
- Thierry Henry & Ruud van Nistelrooy (2 April 2004)
- Werder Bremen (11 May 2004)
- Michael Owen & Emile Heskey (14 May 2004)
- Michael Ballack & Jens Jeremies (15 June 2004)
- Greece national football team (6 July 2004)
- Kily González & Ulises de la Cruz (20 July 2004)
- Wayne Rooney & Thierry Henry (22 October 2004)
- Patrick Kluivert & Nicky Butt (9 November 2004)
- Zlatan Ibrahimović & Luis García (12 April 2005)
- Frank Lampard, Damien Duff & Eiður Guðjohnsen (22 April 2005)
- John Terry, Frank Lampard & Roman Abramovich (3 May 2005)
- Rogério Ceni & Fabão (12 July 2005)
- David Pizarro & Esteban Cambiasso (9 August 2005)
- Ruud van Nistelrooy, Didier Drogba, Djibril Cissé & Thierry Henry (12 August 2005)
- David Beckham & Alberto Gilardino (26 August 2005)
- Steven Gerrard & John Terry (3 February 2006)
- Rio Ferdinand & Peter Crouch (17 February 2006)
- Filippo Inzaghi & Adriano (14 April 2006)
- Ronaldinho & Thierry Henry (16 May 2006)
- Michael Ballack & Luca Toni (4 July 2006)
- Francesco Totti & Thierry Henry (7 July 2006)
- Italy national football team (11 July 2006)
- Fabio Cannavaro, Patrick Vieira & Luca Toni (18 July 2006)
- Cristiano Ronaldo & Dirk Kuyt (2 March 2007)
- Peter Crouch & Philippe Senderos (30 March 2007)
- AC Milan (25 May 2007)
- Robbie Keane & Wayne Rooney (12 September 2008)
- Karim Benzema, Cristiano Ronaldo & Kaká (14 July 2009)
- David Beckham & Wayne Rooney (16 February 2010)
- Samuel Eto'o & Frank Lampard (23 February 2010)
- AS Roma (4 March 2010)
- Didier Drogba & Diego Milito (15 March 2010)
- Dani Alves, Lionel Messi & Thierry Henry (5 April 2010)
- Cristiano Ronaldo & Gonzalo Higuaín (8 April 2010)
- Wesley Sneijder & Xavi (19 April 2010)
- Bojan Krkić & Lionel Messi (26 April 2010, 13 May 2010)
- Inter Milan (17 May 2010)
- Spain national football team (12 July 2010)
- Barcelona (19 May 2006, 30 May 2011)
- Diego Forlán & Luis Suárez (21 July 2011)
- Manuel Neuer & Sergio Romero (10-16 July 2014)
- France national football team (17 July 2018)
- Indonesia national football team (26 October 2025)

== Logos ==
From March 1984, there are two different logos for this tabloid. The first logo was in use from 1984 to 2009, the second and last logo was in use from 2009 to 2018.

== Bolasport.com and Superball.ID ==
Bola brand currently only exists in its online portal Bolasport.com. The Super Ball online portal, which was originally a subdomain of Tribunnews.com, is currently a subdomain of Bola portal with the name Superball.ID.
