= Pos Kota =

Newspaper from Indonesia

- Type: Daily newspaper
- Format: Broadsheet
- Owner: PT Media Antarkota Jaya
- Founder(s): Harmoko, Jahja Surjawinata, Tahar S. Abiyasa, Pansa Tampubolon
- Founded: April 15, 1970
- Language: Indonesian
- Headquarters: Jakarta
- City: Jakarta
- Country: Indonesia
- Website: www.poskota.co.id

Pos Kota (The City Post) is an Indonesia daily newspaper published in Jakarta, published by PT Media Antarkota Jaya since 1970. Generally, the newspaper contains local, crime, and society news, as well as sports and entertainment news targeted for the mid-lower society. One distinctive feature of the newspaper is the conspicuous and irregular layout.

== History ==
Pos Kota was founded by the former Minister of Information during the New Order, Harmoko, and several partners, including John Surjawinata, Tahar S. Abiyasa, and Pansa Tampubolon.

Before that, Harmoko made a survey in several places in Jakarta, such as Tanjung Priok, Jatinegara, Tanah Abang, and Senen. The survey found that people want the news relating to the real problems in their daily lives. Therefore, Pos Kota news content are ranging from crime, law, sexuality, and sports news. Pos Kota was first published on 15 April 1970 with 3,500 copies and got a good reception so that a few months later the circulation rose into 30.000-60.000 copies per month.

In 1999, Pos Kota published digital versions, named Pos Kota Online, and began targeting business sector as its market share. In its development, Pos Kota also covered political issues in its news coverage.

In May–June 2005, Cakram magazine published the results of Nielsen Media Research survey, which puts Pos Kota as the Indonesia's biggest-selling newspaper, with a circulation of 600,000 and 2,551 readers, thus defeating the national daily Kompas.
