= Harmoko =

Indonesian politician and journalist (1939–2021)

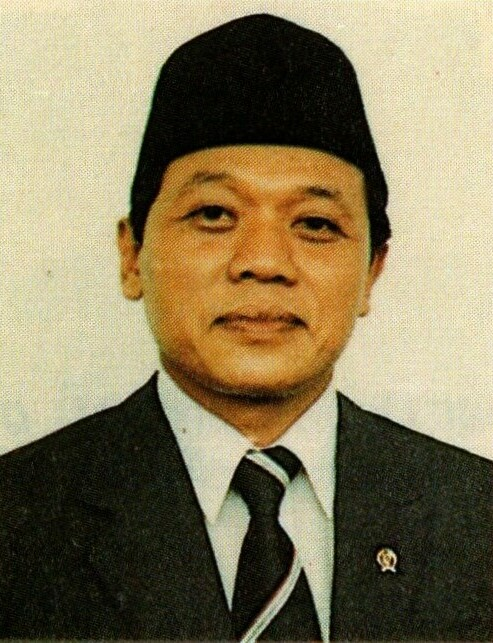
- Official portrait, 1992

9th Speaker of the People's Consultative Assembly
- In office 1 October 1997 – 30 September 1999
- Preceded by: Wahono
- Succeeded by: Amien Rais

12th Speaker of the House of Representatives
- In office 1 October 1997 – 30 September 1999
- Preceded by: Wahono
- Succeeded by: Akbar Tandjung

6th General Chairman of Golkar
- In office 24 October 1993 – 11 July 1998
- Preceded by: Wahono
- Succeeded by: Akbar Tandjung

22nd Minister of Information
- In office 19 March 1983 – 16 March 1997
- President: Suharto
- Preceded by: Ali Murtopo
- Succeeded by: R. Hartono

Personal details
- Born: 7 February 1939 Patianrowo, Nganjuk, Oost-Java, Dutch East Indies
- Died: 4 July 2021 (aged 82) Jakarta, Indonesia
- Cause of death: COVID-19
- Resting place: Kalibata Heroes' Cemetery
- Party: Independent
- Other political affiliations: Golkar (1977–2007); PKN (2007–2008)
- Spouse: Sri Romadhiyati (m. 1972; died 2021)
- Occupation: Politician; journalist

Harmoko (7 February 1939 – 4 July 2021), colloquially referred to as Bung Harmoko, was an Indonesian politician and journalist who was active during the New Order era. He served as the Speaker of the People's Representative Council from 1997 until 1999, and was a factor in president Suharto's resignation during the widespread student demonstrations which occurred at the end of the New Order.

Born from humble origins in East Java, on 7 February 1939, Harmoko graduated from journalistic school, and became a journalist. He was active during the Guided Democracy and New Order regimes, working in a number of different newspapers, including Merdeka, Merdiko, and Harian Mimbar Kita. In 1970, he founded his own newspaper, the Pos Kota in Jakarta. In 1970, he was elected as the General Chairperson of the Indonesian Journalists Association (PWI) branch in Jakarta, and two years later, he was elected as the General Chairperson of the entire PWI.

In 1977, Harmoko was elected a member of the People's Representative Council, as a member of the ruling Golkar organization. In 1983, he was appointed Minister of Information, likely due to his background in journalism. His skill at maintaining the New Order's image and Suharto's appearance led to him being dubbed the 'influencer-in-chief'. In 1993, Harmoko was elected as the Chairman of Golkar, becoming the first civilian to hold the post. In June 1997, he was appointed state minister for special affairs, a post he held for only three months as in October 1997, he was chosen to serve as the Speaker of the People's Consultative Assembly and People's Representative Council.

Despite years of loyalty to President Suharto, following widespread student demonstrations calling for a change of government, Harmoko caused great surprise at a press conference by asking the president to step down within five days. Likely because he may have been upset by his dismissal as information minister, his dismissal as a possible vice presidential candidate, and his house being burned down by protesters. Suharto saw Harmoko's request as a betrayal, while Tadjus Sobirin, the former chairman of Golkar's Jakarta branch called Harmoko "Brutus" during a leadership meeting of the party, a reference to Roman senator Marcus Junius Brutus, who assassinated his great-uncle Julius Caesar. Harmoko died on 4 July 2021 at the Gatot Soebroto Army Hospital due to COVID-19, and was buried the following day at Kalibata Heroes' Cemetery.

== Early life and education ==
Harmoko was born in Patianrowo Village, Nganjuk Regency, East Java, Dutch East Indies, on 7 February 1939. He was the third child of ten children. Harmoko was raised by both of his parents, his mother, Soeriptinah, and his father, Asmoprawiro. He began his education at the People's School (the equivalent of primary school today), before pursuing further education to the Junior High School (SMP), and High School (SMA). Harmoko eventually became actively involved in the Surakarta Cultural Association, and attended journalism education there. He took part in the VII Regular Program at the National Resilience Institute. He continued his journalistic endeavors, and attended a journalistic school in Jakarta.

== Journalism career ==
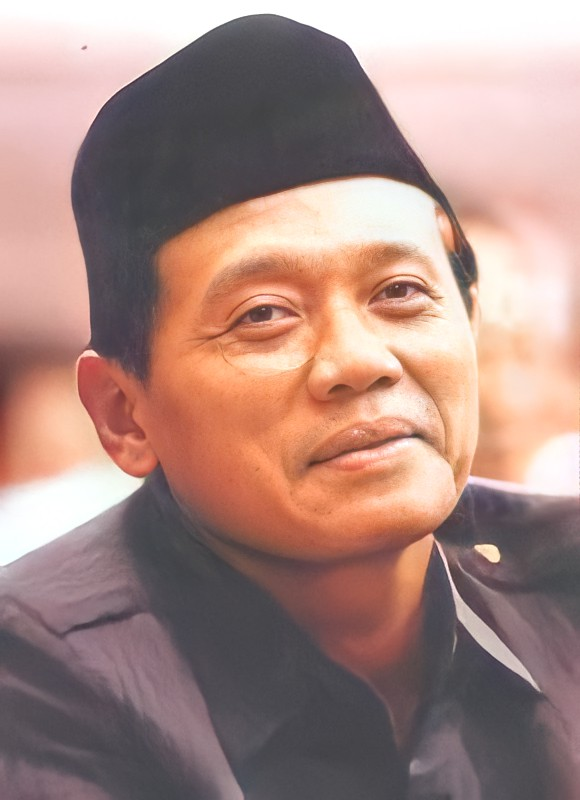
Harmoko, date unknown

After graduating from Journalistic school in Jakarta, he worked as a journalist and cartoonist at the Harian Merdeka (Merdeka Daily) newspaper, until 1962, when he left to work for the Berita Merdeka (Merdeka Magazine). In 1964, he left Berita Merdeka, and went to work at the Harian Angkatan Bersenjata (Armed Forces Daily). He continued his journalistic career at the API Daily in 1965, before serving as the editor-in-chief of the Javanese-language magazine, Merdiko. In the following year, he became the head of the Harian Mimbar Kita newspaper.

In 1970, he, together with some friends, founded his own newspaper, the Pos Kota (City Post). The post was designed as a daily paper, with a people's perspective, which was to report the events experienced by the "little people". The venture was highly risky, as the "little people" (the target audience of the paper), had little purchasing power. However, the business proved successful, and Harmoko made a considerable sum from the paper. The contents of Pos Kota discussed the various aspects of people's lives in the capital city of Jakarta, from politics, social affairs, and crime. Another distinctive feature of the Pos Kota was the appendix, which contained pictures of urban life which were presented in the form of cartoons, which conveyed Harmoko's social criticisms of people's daily lives. He was also responsible for the creation of the Terbit newspaper.

His paper's success made him a figure within the Indonesian press. In 1970, he was elected as the General Chairperson of the Indonesian Journalists Association (PWI) branch in Jakarta. He served as the chair of the branch from 1970 until 1972, when he was elected as General Chairperson of the Central PWI in 1973. He served as General Chairperson of the PWI from 1973 until 1983, becoming the longest serving chairperson of the PWI.

== Political career ==
=== Cabinet minister ===
In 1977, Harmoko was elected a member of the People's Representative Council (DPR), as a member of the ruling Golkar organization. He continued his career in DPR, eventually becoming the Chairman of the Golkar Central Executive Board (DPP). As chairman of the Golkar DPP, Harmoko succeeded in influencing the public during the 1982 elections, through the Safari Ramadhan program. In 1983, he was appointed Minister of Information, likely due to his background in journalism. He served as information minister in three successive cabinets (Fourth Development Cabinet, Fifth Development Cabinet and Sixth Development Cabinet) from 1983 until 1997, during which time it was said that his name was an abbreviation for hari-hari omong kosong (talking nonsense every day). Harmoko used his authority to extend the remit of the press publication enterprise permit (SIUPP). Withdrawal of the SIUPP from a publishing company meant it could no longer legally function, and it could also be used to effectively ban individual publications. After the weekly news magazine Tempo published an article critical of the purchase of 39 East German warships by Research and Technology Minister B. J. Habibie, the magazine's SIUPP was revoked on 21 June 1994 and it ceased publishing. Two other news publications, Detik and Editor, were banned at the same time.

Following a term as deputy chairman, Harmoko was chairman of the Golkar ruling political organization from 1993 to 1998, becoming the first civilian to hold this position. In June 1997, he was appointed state minister for special affairs, a post he held for only three months as in October 1997, he was chosen as chairman of the People's Consultative Assembly and People's Representative Council, a post he held until 1999. Despite years of loyalty to President Suharto, following widespread student demonstrations calling for a change of government, on 18 May 1998, Harmoko caused great surprise at a press conference by asking the president to step down within five days. This may have been because Harmoko was upset by his dismissal as information minister and his not being considered for the vice-presidency, or possibly because Harmoko was upset after rioters set fire to his house in Surakarta.

Suharto saw Harmoko's request as a betrayal, and when Harmoko attempted to visit Suharto on his deathbed in 2008, he was refused. Tadjus Sobirin, Golkar's Jakarta chairman in 1998, called Harmoko "Brutus" during a leadership meeting of the party.

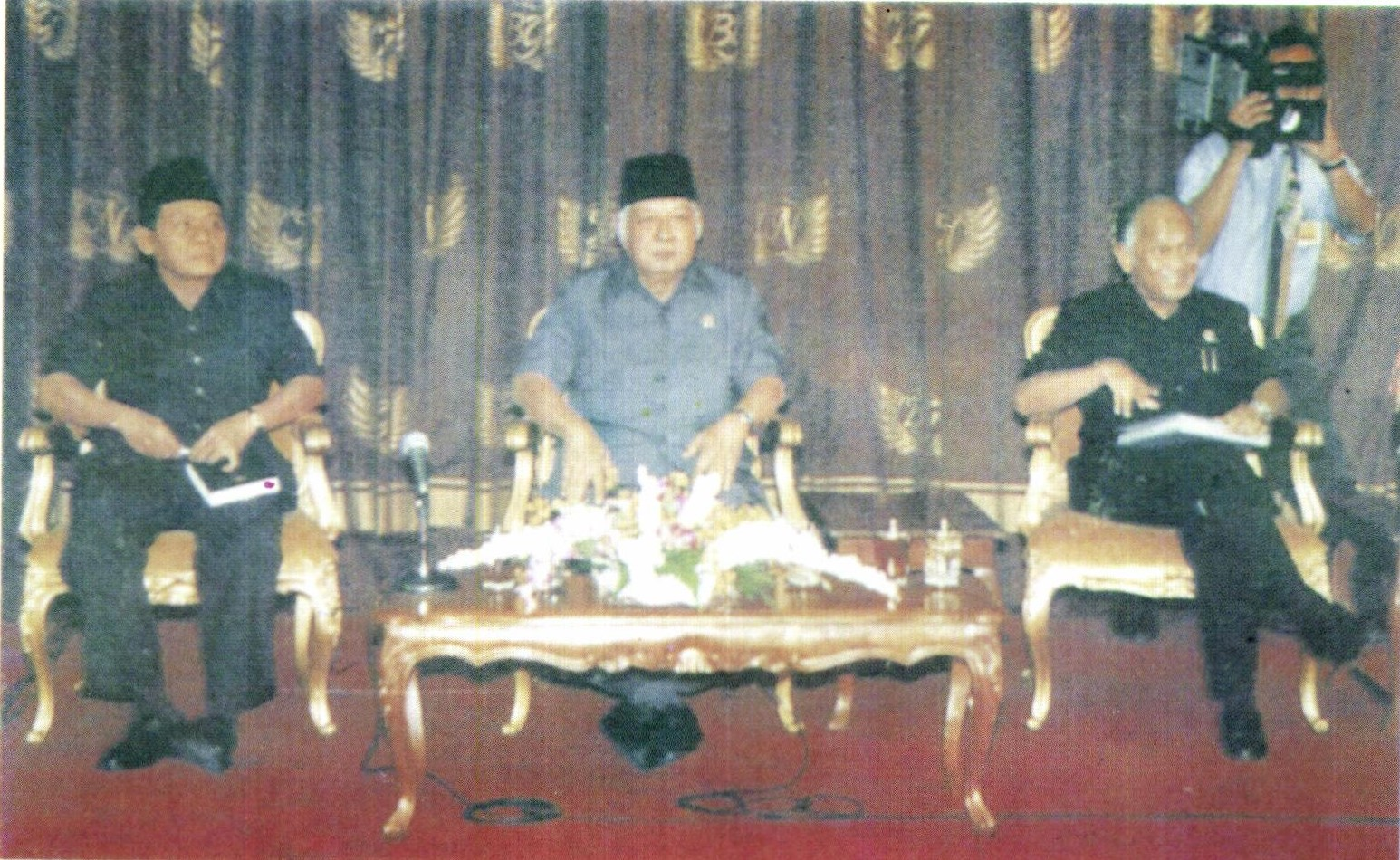
Harmoko (left) sitting alongside President Suharto and Vice President B. J. Habibie.

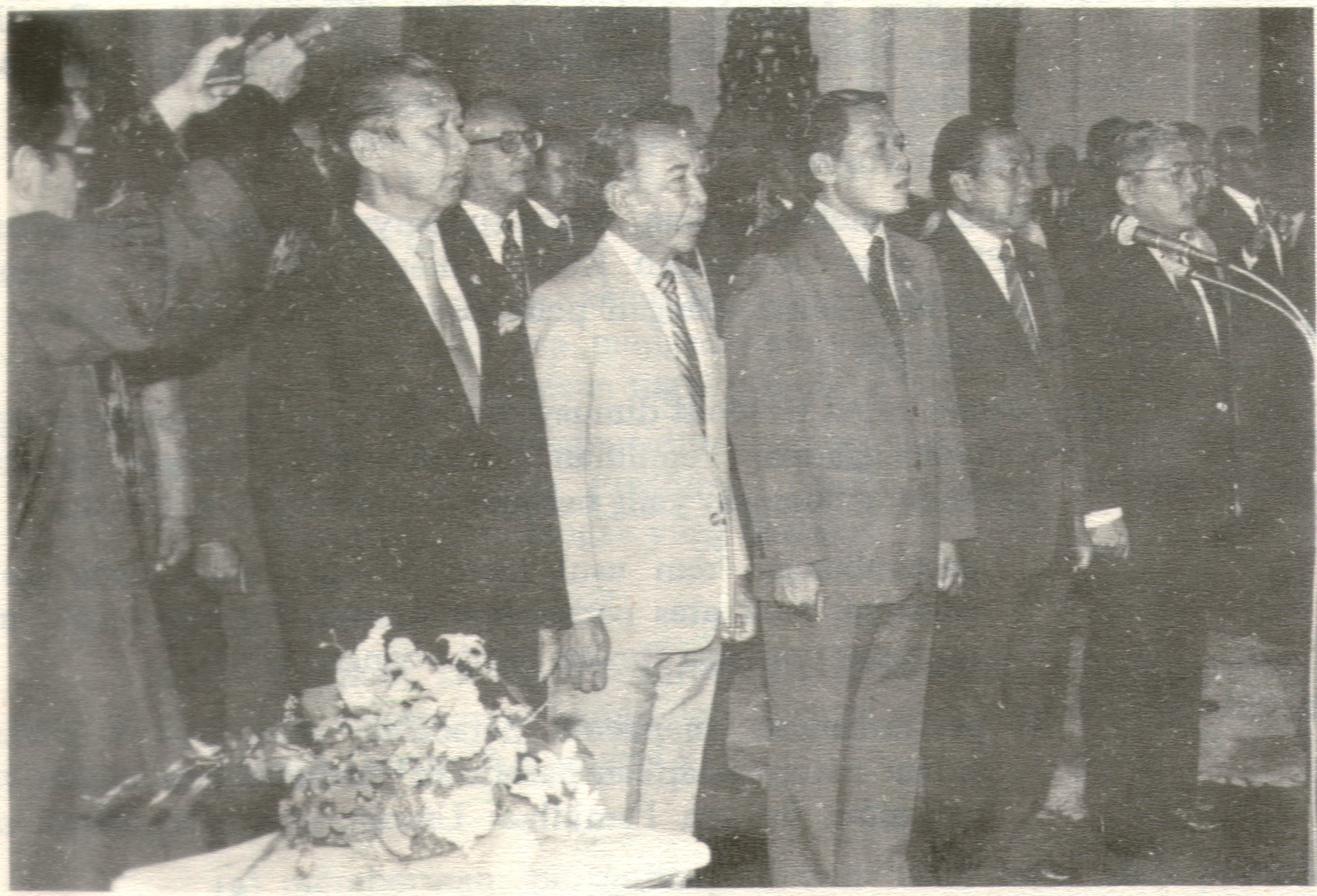
Harmoko (fourth from left) being sworn in as a functionary of the General Elections Institution.

== Death ==
Harmoko died on 4 July 2021 at the Gatot Soebroto Army Hospital due to COVID-19, and was buried the following day at Kalibata Heroes' Cemetery. He had previously suffered from progressive supranuclear palsy since 2013.

== Honours ==
=== National ===
Indonesia:

- Star of the Republic of Indonesia, 3rd Class (Indonesian: Bintang Republik Indonesia Utama) (1999)
- Star of Mahaputera, 2nd Class (Indonesian: Bintang Mahaputera Adipradana) (1987)

=== Foreign honours ===
- Austria:
  - Grand Decoration of Honour in Gold of the Decoration of Honour for Services to the Republic of Austria (1996)
- Malaysia:
  - Honorary Commander of the Order of Loyalty to the Crown of Malaysia (P.S.M.)

Political offices
| Preceded by Wahono | Speaker of the House of Representatives; 1997–1999 | Succeeded by Akbar Tandjung |
| Preceded by Wahono | Speaker of the People's Consultative Assembly; 1997–1999 | Succeeded by Amien Rais |
Party political offices
| Preceded by Wahono | General Chairman of Golkar; 1993–1998 | Succeeded by Akbar Tandjung |
