= Primagama Tutoring Institution =

Tutoring institution in Indonesia

- Founded: 10 March 1982
- Founder: Purdi E. Chandra
- Headquarters: Yogyakarta, Indonesia
- Number of locations: 766 (2011)

Primagama Tutoring Institution, known as Primagama, is the largest tutoring institution in Indonesia. It started on March 10, 1982, at an office in Yogyakarta. Primagama gives extra education to students from elementary and high school to gain academic success. Primagama has 300 branches across 21 cities, with more than 14,000 students and 3,200 tutors. Awards include ISO certificate 1998, Superbrand, Marketing Award, Franchise Award, and Top Brand for Kid.

== History ==
The institution has 766 branches throughout Indonesia. Almost every year, approximately 300,000 students join Primagama. Primagama is confirmed as Indonesia’ largest tutoring organisation by MURI (the Indonesian Record Museum). Primagama is also a holding company which has 20 subsidiaries in formal education, non-formal education, telecommunications, travel agents, restaurants, supermarkets, insurance, and golf courses.

== New Primagama Powered by Zenius ==
Zenius officially acquired Primagama by signing the memorandum of understanding (MoU) in February 2022. Through the acquisition, Primagama's name changed to “New Primagama Powered by Zenius,” which was announced on Primagama's 40th anniversary.

Through this new brand, New Primagama Powered by Zenius launched a hybrid learning method with a two-teachers model approach that allows students in all New Primagama branches to learn virtually with one master tutor at the same time. Meanwhile, offline tutor in New Primagama branches also accompany their students, and provide additional guidelines and mentoring directly.

This learning method has been introduced through a series of events dubbed Hybrid Edunation which was held in Surabaya in July. This event was also held collaboratively with the Deputy Governor of East Java Emil Dardak and content creator Jerome Polin.
