= Liputan 6 =

Indonesian television news program

- Logo used as of 1 October 2019, with font of the number "6" reused from the 1996 logo
- Created by: Ahmad Syarief
- Directed by: Retno Pinasti
- Country of origin: Indonesia
- Original language: Indonesian

Production
- Executive producer: Retno Pinasti
- Production location: Jakarta

Original release
- Network: SCTV
- Release: 7 November 1994 – present
- Network: Moji
- Release: 31 July 2023 – present

Related
- Fokus

Liputan 6 (The 6 Report) is an Indonesian television news program that broadcasts on SCTV and Moji. Its slogan is Aktual, Tajam, dan Terpercaya (Current, Sharp, and Trusted).

== History ==
The first program, Liputan 6 Petang, was launched on 20 May 1996, by the first news anchor, Riza Primadi. To greet all viewers, every articles reading always begins with "Saudara"'(brother/sister), not "Pemirsa" (viewer) till present (like Kompas).

Liputan 6 also has an online news portal, Liputan6.com, which was originally launched on 24 August 2000 to coincide with the channel's 10th anniversary.

Starting on 31 July 2023, Liputan 6 also began broadcasting on the Moji network through the morning program Liputan 6 Pagi Moji, which airs live every day at 06.15 WIB.

== Style news ==
This news program, the last daily news, is always negative or bad news, like disastercrime news (like Kompas).

== Timeslots List ==
=== Liputan 6 Pagi ===
- Everyday, 05.00 WIB - 06.00 WIB

=== Liputan 6 Siang ===
- Everyday, 12.00 WIB - 12.30 WIB

=== Liputan 6 Terkini ===
- Everyday, five times a day

=== Liputan 6 Breaking News ===
- Everyday, rarely

== Segments ==
=== Liputan 6 Pagi ===
- Laporan Utama
- Laporan Daerah
- Ekonomi & Bisnis
- Mancanegara
- Olahraga
- Musik & Hiburan
- Ilmu & Teknologi
- Sosial & Budaya
- Gaya Hidup
- Intisari Laporan Utama

=== Liputan 6 Siang ===
- Laporan Utama
- Laporan Daerah
- Ekonomi & Bisnis
- Mancanegara
- Gaya Hidup
- Sosial & Budaya

== See also ==
- Kompas
- Menyapa Indonesia
- Bingkai Kota
- SCTV (TV network) § Presenters
