= Jakob Oetama =

Indonesian journalist (1931–2020)

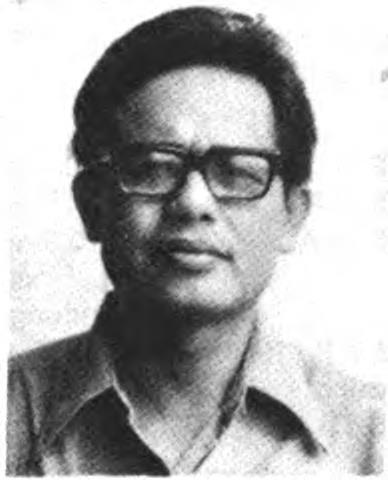
- Oetama, c. 1970

Member of the People's Consultative Assembly
- In office 1 October 1997 – 7 November 1998
- President: Suharto; B. J. Habibie

Member of the People's Representative Council
- In office 1 February 1967 – 1 October 1977
- President: Suharto

Personal details
- Born: 27 September 1931 Magelang, Dutch East Indies
- Died: 9 September 2020 (aged 88) Jakarta, Indonesia
- Resting place: Kalibata Heroes' Cemetery, Jakarta
- Education: Gajah Mada University
- Occupation: President director and founder of kompas daily

Jakob Oetama (27 September 1931 – 9 September 2020) was an Indonesian teacher, journalist, and businessman who was one of the co-founders and owners of Kompas Gramedia Group, the largest media group in Indonesia, together with P. K. Ojong. He served as President Director of Kompas Gramedia, Advisor to the Central Board of the Indonesian Journalists Association, and Advisor to the Association of Southeast Asian Nations Journalists Confederation. He was the recipient of the Honoris causa Doctorate in Communications from Gadjah Mada University and the Mahaputra Utama Star award from President Suharto in 1973.

The son of a retired teacher in Sleman, Yogyakarta, his journalistic career began when he became the editor of Penabur Weekly in 1956 and continued with the founding of Intisari magazine in 1963 with P. K. Ojong, who may have been inspired by America's Reader's Digest. Two years later, on 28 June 1965, together with Ojong, Oetama founded the Kompas daily newspaper which he managed until his death.

In the 1980s, the Kompas Gramedia Group began to develop rapidly, especially in the field of communication. In addition, together with Jusuf Wanandi, Muhammad Chudori, Eric Samola, Fikri Jufri, Goenawan Mohamad, and Harmoko, Oetama also co-founded The Jakarta Post, Indonesia's national English daily newspaper.

Oetama died on 9 September 2020, coinciding with Kompas Television's 9th anniversary, at Mitra Keluarga Hospital Kelapa Gading, Jakarta and was interred at the Kompas Gramedia Building. He was given a state funeral on 10 September 2020 at the Kalibata Heroes' Cemetery.

== Early life and education ==
=== Early life ===
Oetama was born on 27 September 1931 in Magelang, Central Java, to a Javanese family of Catholic background, in Jowahan hamlet, Wanurejo village, 500 metres east of the Borobudur temple, Magelang Regency, Central Java, during the Dutch East Indies era. His father was a school teacher in Sleman, Yogyakarta. His parents initially wanted him to be either a priest, or a teacher in his father's footsteps.

=== Education ===
Oetama finished his basic education in Yogyakarta, and continued his education at Seminary High School in Yogyakarta (1951). In his early career, he worked as a teacher in Mardiyuwana Junior High School in Cipanas, Cianjur, West Java, and then at Van Lith Junior High School in Jakarta. He continued teaching while majoring in history education, graduating in 1956. Oetama further studied journalism in Jakarta and graduated in 1959. He also studied at Gajah Mada University, also majoring in journalism, and graduated in 1961.

== Career ==
Oetama's journalistic career started when he became an editor of Penabur weekly in 1955. In 1963, he established the Intisari magazine with his business partner and also fellow journalist, P. K. Ojong, which was inspired by Reader's Digest. Two years later, on 28 June 1965, also with Ojong, Oetama established the Kompas daily. Oetama and Ojong based the journalistic team of Kompas from the staff they had recruited for Intisari. He successfully managed Kompas throughout Suharto's authoritarian regime (1965–1998), which repressed the press and media freedom. Especially during the 1970s, when a number of news outlets were censored by the government, Kompas under Oetama approached journalism with caution and reported political issues with a moderating view, and hence largely escaped censorship. One exception was a two-week period in 1978 when Kompas was banned for reporting on student protests, and a conflict erupted between Ojong who would have preferred to close down Kompas to submitting to government demands, and Oetama, who was willing to fall in line with the government.

Oetama became the general manager and the leading figure of Kompas following Ojong's death in 1980. Under Oetama's leadership, Kompas grew into a media conglomerate through extensive diversification and reinvestments of profits. By the early 1990s, the group under Kompas consisted of 38 subsidiaries and employed around 10,000 people. Beyond traditional print and publishing businesses the Kompas Gramedia Group under him also expanded into bookstores (i.e. Gramedia), hotels, and some manufacturing. Together with Jusuf Wanandi, Muhammad Chudori, Eric Samola, Fikri Jufri, Goenawan Mohamad, H. G. Rorimpandey and Harmoko; Oetama also established The Jakarta Post, an English language Indonesian newspaper, in 1983.

Between the 1978 censoring and the fall of Suharto in 1998, Kompas did not publish open criticism of the Suharto government, leading Rosihan Anwar to criticize Oetama's cautious stance as "crab journalism". Despite this, however, Kompas remained politically autonomous, and still criticized the government with more subtle allusions. Kompas still maintained good relations with government-controlled media outlets and was willing to sanction their journalists or close certain publications instead of triggering conflict with the government or draw public ire – one example was the shutdown of the Monitor magazine and the expelling of Arswendo Atmowiloto, which was recommended by a committee chaired by Oetama directly. Oetama remained editor-in-chief of Kompas until 2000, when he selected Suryopratomo as his replacement.

GlobeAsia estimated the net worth of Oetama and his son Lilik at US$1.65 billion in 2018, making them the 21st richest Indonesians. Oetama was major supporter of the arts, establishing Bentara Budaya under Kompas Gramedia in 1982 which had galleries in Jakarta, Yogyakarta and Bali. He is a recipient of the Star of Mahaputera, 3rd class in 1973. Oetama had additionally served as an appointee to the People's Representative Council between 1 February 1967 and 1 October 1977, and again in 1997 although he had resigned by 1998. He received an honoris causa in communication from his former alma mater Gajah Mada University on 17 April 2003.

== Death ==
On 22 August 2020, Oetama was admitted to Mitra Keluarga Hospital in Kelapa Gading, North Jakarta, in a critical condition, suffering from multiple organ disorders. He lapsed into a coma on 6 September and died on 9 September at the age of 88 from multiple organ failure. His funeral procession was held on 10 September 2020 at Kompas Gramedia headquarters in Jakarta, broadcast live on Kompas TV and attended by 60 people in compliance with COVID-19 prevention guidelines. He was buried after a state funeral at Kalibata Heroes' Cemetery in South Jakarta at the same day. The procession at Kalibata was led by former Vice President Jusuf Kalla.

== See also ==
- Bentara Budaya Yogyakarta
