= Kompas Gramedia Group =

Indonesian holding company

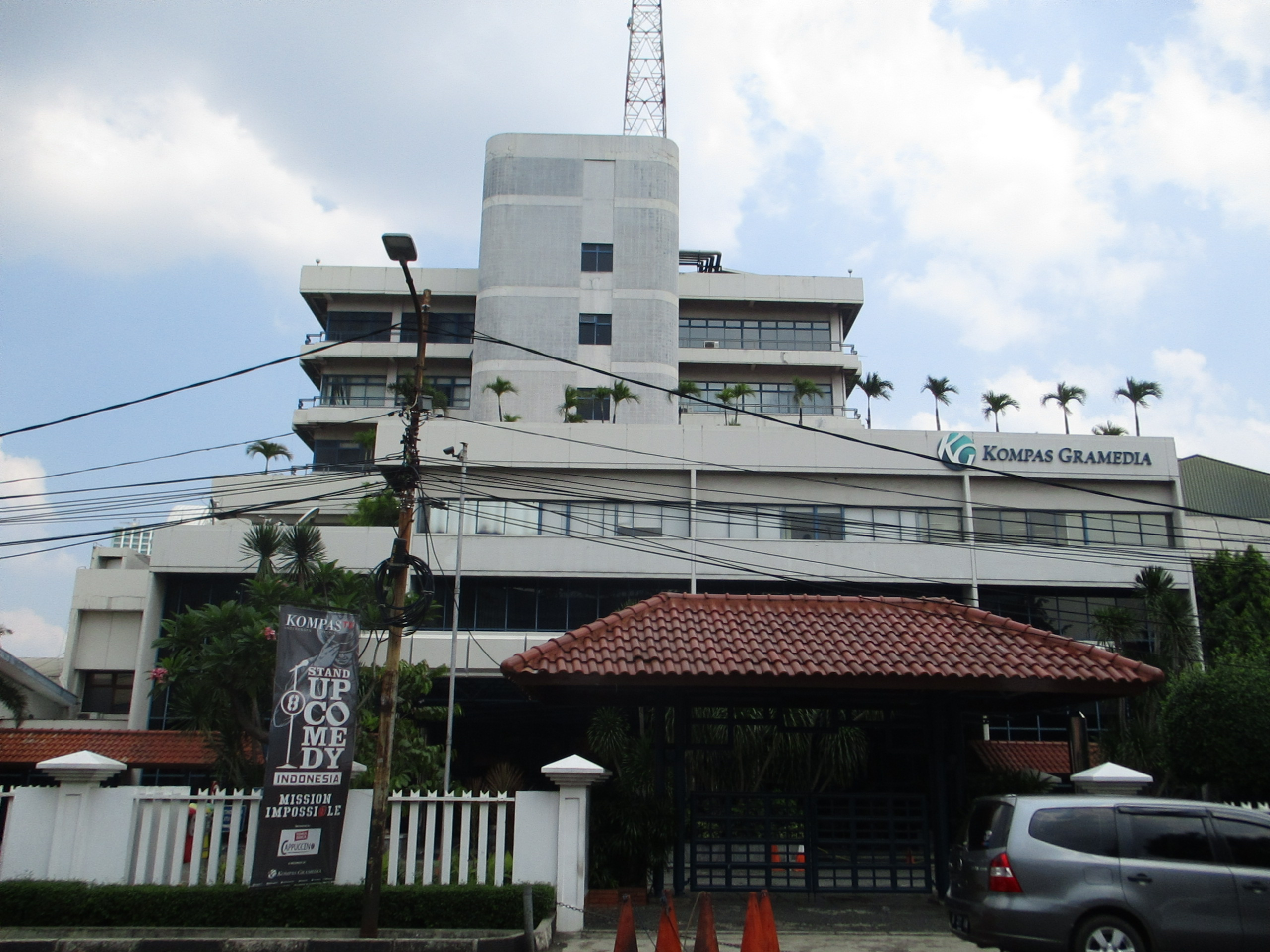
- Kompas Gramedia Building in Jakarta
- Type: Private
- Industry: Conglomerate
- Founded: 17 August 1963; 63 years ago
- Founder: Petrus Kanisius Ojong; Jakob Oetama
- Headquarters: South Palmerah road 22-26, Jakarta, Indonesia
- Area served: Indonesia
- Key people: Lilik Oetama (Chairman and CEO)
- Products: Media; Property; Event organizer
- Owner: Oetama family
- Subsidiaries: KG Media (Note: Kompas Media Nusantara, Gramedia Pustaka Utama); Dyandra Promosindo; Santika Indonesia Hotels & Resorts; Multimedia Nusantara University
- Website: kompasgramedia.com

Kompas Gramedia is a major Indonesian media company. It engages in several businesses, predominantly mass media, as well as hospitality, manufacturing, and event organizing.

The company's businesses consist of multiple divisions, such as media assets (including the Kompas daily newspaper; the Kompas TV television network; the Sonora radio network; the Gramedia bookstore chain, the Santika Indonesia hospitality chain, Dyandra event organization firm, and Graha Bumi Hijau, a tissue paper manufacturer known for its flagship brand, Tessa.

== History ==
After the success of the magazine Intisari (released 17 August 1963), Petrus Kanisius Ojong and Jakob Oetama launched a national newspaper called Kompas. The newspaper's first issue was released on 28 June 1965.

Their aim was to fill some of the huge gaps in daily news and information that existed at that time. Kompas has since become a large circulation newspaper with an audited circulation in 2005 of 600,000 copies a day. As the largest media company in Indonesia, the KGG operates the largest network printing service in Indonesia.

== Media ==
As of 2018, all media units of Kompas Gramedia is reorganized into one subsidiary, called KG Media.

=== Newspapers ===
==== Kompas ====
PT Kompas Media Nusantara published Kompas, the national daily newspaper. Kompas began its first issue on 28 June 1965. Since 1969, Kompas has dominated sales nationwide. As of 2013, Kompas had an average circulation of 500,000 copies per day, reaching an average of 1,850,000 people per day. Kompas is not just regarded as the largest circulating newspaper in Indonesia but is also the largest circulating newspaper in Southeast Asia.

==== Kontan ====
PT Grahanusa Mediatama published Kontan, the business and financial publication. Originally published in 1996 as a weekly newspaper (now called Tabloid Kontan), currently Kontan also published as a daily newspaper.

==== Tribun Network ====
PT Indopersda Primamedia, more known as Tribun Network, is the local newspaper chain founded by Kompas Gramedia. Operating regional newspapers since 1988, the chain currently publishes 22 regional newspapers — some of them bearing the unified name Tribun — as well as a national sports newspaper Super Ball.

===== Warta Kota =====
Warta Kota (The City News) is a daily Indonesian morning newspaper published in Jakarta, Indonesia, serving the Jabodetabek area. It is in a broadsheet format and published by PT Metrogema Media Nusantara, a subsidiary of Kompas Gramedia (KG), and part of The Tribun Network.

Warta Kota began publication after the Ministry of Information under the B.J. Habibie administration relaxed the procedures for applying for a business license (SIUPP) for print media. Indonesia's national newspaper, Kompas (a subsidiary of KG), up until 1998, had designated only two pages per issue for news in Jakarta and its surroundings which were mostly filled with advertisements, even though the newspaper was published in Jakarta. To fill this void, Warta Kota was created. Warta Kota was first published on May 3, 1999, amid the 1999 general election campaign.

=== Magazines ===
The magazine unit of Kompas Gramedia is organized under Grid Network subsidiary.

The business unit also handles 43 tabloids and magazine titles (30 originals and 13 licensed) as well as successful comic series and other books titles such as:

- Hai (1977–2017)
- Intisari (1963–2024)
- Kawanku (1970–2016)
- Nova (1988–2022)
- MotorPlus (1999–2018)
- Otomotif (1991–present)
- Travel Fotografi (2012–2015)
- Sinyal (2005–2016)
- CHIC (2005–2014)
- Nakita (1999–2017)
- Sekar (2009–2013)
- Bobo (1973–present)
- Bola (1984–2018)
- Commando
- Soccer (2000–2014)
- Citra (defunct)
- Angkasa (1990–2017)
- Scooteriz
- Mombi (1991–2022)
- Auto Expert (2008–2016)
- Jip (2002–2020)
- Car & Tuning Guide (1998–2016)
- Otosport (2000–2003, 2007–2012)
- Motor (1995–2016)
- Oto Plus (2003–2017)
- Rumah (2003–2017)
- Saji (2003–2021)
- Sedap (1999–2019)
- Girls (2005–2015)
- Info Komputer (1985–2020)
- Idea (2003–2020)
- Ide Bisnis (2010–2014)
- Flona (2003–2014)
- Bobo Junior (2002–2022)
- Mombi SD (2004–2022)
- Donal Bebek (1976–2020)

Licensed magazine titles include:

- Martha Stewart Living
- Auto Bild
- InStyle
- Disney Junior
- National Geographic Magazine
- Chip

As of December 2016, there are eight monthly printed magazines or tabloids (Kawanku, Sinyal, Chip, Chip Foto Video, What Hi Fi, Auto Expert, Car and Turning Guide, and Motor), which were transformed into online publications.

=== Publishing ===
In 1973 Kompas Gramedia formed Gramedia Pustaka Utama (GPU) and began publishing its first titles. This company enjoyed outstanding success and today publishes more than 600 titles a year.

==== Handbooks ====
The group has met demands for technological as well as educational publications. PT Elex Media Komputindo (EMK), founded in 1985, publishes books on computers and electronics. EMK also publishes technology-related business and management books, comics, educational books, and computer software. Annually EMK publishes about 1500 new titles, 51% of which are translations from foreign works. PT Prima Info Sarana Media issues computer magazine Infokomputer and Tabloid PC Plus as well as home and interior design tabloid Rumah.

==== Educational publishing ====
In 1990 PT Gramedia Widiasarana Indonesia, popularly known as Grasindo, started to concentrate on school textbooks and other educational materials for kindergarten, primary, and secondary schools. It now publishes around 300 new titles a year.

==== Others ====
Besides the aforementioned companies, the group also owned several other publishing companies, such as Kepustakaan Populer Gramedia (KPG, literally Gramedia Popular Books) and Penerbit Buku Kompas (published books under the Kompas brand).

=== Online media ===
==== Kompas.com ====
Kompas.com is the online news portal of Kompas, but of separate editorial staff. As of early 2014, Kompas.com is the second largest after detik.com.

==== Tribunnews.com ====
Tribunnews.com is the online news portal of Tribun Network. Tribunnews.com was cited by Andalas University in 2018 as the most popular nationally hosted website in Indonesia, with 183.2 million visits per month. It was ranked 38 in the world's most popular websites by traffic as of April 16, 2020 by Alexa Internet.

=== Broadcasting ===
==== Radio ====
1973 saw the inception of Radio Sonora which broadcast mainly into metropolitan Jakarta. Now RS has other radio stations in cities such as Surabaya (East Java), Yogyakarta (DI Yogyakarta), Pangkalpinang (Bangka Belitung), Pontianak (West Kalimantan), Palembang (South Sumatra), Bandung, Cirebon (West Java), Semarang, Solo, Purwokerto (Central Java), Bali, Palangkaraya, Banjarbaru, Makassar, and Medan.

==== Television ====
To complete its core business alignment, Kompas Gramedia founded PT Duta Visual Nusantara Tivi Tujuh, popularly known as TV7, in 2001. TV7 provides family entertainment programmes (news, children's programmes, sports, and movie films). In 2006, Trans Corp (currently Trans Media, a subsidiary of CT Corp) bought 55% of TV7 shares and changed its name to Trans 7.

On 9 September 2011, Kompas Gramedia launched another television network Kompas TV. The group also owns and operates local station KTV, a local TV station in Jakarta which the group bought in 2011 and became one of the initial affiliates of Kompas TV before it spun off as an independent station in 2015. Kompas Gramedia also founded K-Vision, a satellite television services provider, before its 60% stake was acquired by MNC Media in 2019.

== Bookshops ==
Gramedia was first established on 2 February 1970, owned and managed by PT Gramedia Asri Media (GAM), a wholly owned subsidiary of Kompas Gramedia. GAM is the retail distribution channel for the group which also handles foreign publishers and partners. The first bookstore is in Jalan Gajah Mada, West Jakarta.

Kompas Gramedia went on to set up PT Gramedia, a printing plant in Jakarta in 1972 in order to meet the ever-increasing needs of the newspapers and magazines. Gramedia offers books, stationery, office supplies, sports supplies, high-technology products, and others.

== Hospitality business ==
Since 1981, Kompas Gramedia Group spread to the hospitality business, under PT Grahawita Santika.

In 2026, Santika faced criticism from animal welfare organizations regarding its continued use of battery cages. Advocacy groups have called on the company to implement higher welfare standards, noting that several competitors have already committed to phasing out similar practices. The issue has been highlighted in consumer awareness campaigns and media reports.

== Education ==
Kompas Gramedia Group officially launched Multimedia Nusantara University in 2006. Located in Tangerang, Banten, the university offers ICT-based higher education.

The group also operates education training ELTI (short for English Language Training International) with branches spread across Indonesia. Founded in 1981, ELTI became part of the group in 1989.
