= Kompas TV =

Indonesian television broadcaster

KompasTV
- Type: Television broadcaster
- Country: Indonesia
- Broadcast area: Nationwide; Worldwide (via YouTube)
- Headquarters: Menara Kompas 6th Floor, Jalan Palmerah Selatan 21, Gelora, Tanah Abang, Central Jakarta, Indonesia

Programming
- Language: Indonesian
- Picture format: 1080i HDTV (downscaled to 16:9 576i for the SDTV feed)

Ownership
- Owner: KG Media
- Parent: Kompas Gramedia
- Key people: Rosianna M. Silalahi (President Director); Yogi Arief Nugraha (Editor in Chief)
- Sister channels: KTV; Gramedia TV

History
- Founded: 2008
- Launched: 1 August 2011 (trial broadcast); 9 September 2011; 15 years ago (official broadcast)
- Founder: Jakob Oetama

Links
- Website: www.kompas.tv

Availability

Terrestrial
- Digital Greater Jakarta: 24 (UHF); Channel 125
- Digital Regional branches: Check local frequencies (in Indonesian language)

Streaming media
- Vidio: Watch live
- IndiHome TV: Watch live (IndiHome customers only)
- MIVO: Watch live

PT Cipta Megaswara Televisi, operating as Kompas TV, is an Indonesian private terrestrial television news broadcaster. It is owned by the KG Media unit of Kompas Gramedia Group, and named after its flagship property, the Kompas daily newspaper. Kompas TV was founded in 2008 and launched on 9 September 2011 with a concert titled Simfoni Semesta Raya (The Symphony of the Universe). Kompas TV's current slogan is "Independent, Reliable" (Indonesian: Independen, Terpercaya).

On 28 January 2016, Kompas TV was relaunched as a news-oriented network during the Suara Indonesia special event.

== History ==
From 1 August until 8 September 2011, Kompas TV started its test broadcasts on KTV in Jakarta during 19 hours (05:00—19:00 WIT), and soon expanded into 7 cities (Surabaya, Bandung, Medan, Semarang, Surakarta, Yogyakarta, and Makassar) on 30 August 2011. Then, on 9 September 2011, Kompas TV was officially launched on Simfoni Semesta Raya. Jakob Oetama hoped during its launch that Kompas TV could "enlighten the nation and enrich the people". Despite this, the entrance of Kompas TV was not smooth, after receiving protests from Indonesian Broadcasting Commission, and Kompas TV soon removed the text "TV" on its logo on 11 September 2011. However, it was used again since 5 October 2012. Kompas TV is one of the earliest television networks in Indonesia to adopt high definition image quality.

The entrance of Kompas TV in Jabodetabek initially cooperates with a local television station from Banten, KTV, which operates on 28 UHF. At that time, KTV obtained its broadcasting licence in Serang, while its broadcasts were transmitted from Tangerang, following 19 December 2011, the government forced KTV to relocate its transmitters. As a result, KTV and Kompas TV could not be watched in Jakarta, until reobtaining its licence and returning to air on 22 June 2012. A thanksgiving was held on 28 June 2012 (matching the birthday of Kompas), and that date was made as its official birthday for a while until finally returning to 9 September few years later.

To prevent this from happening again, in 2014, Kompas TV took over TV Plus!, a local TV station from Bogor which operated on 25 UHF. Its legal entity (PT Cipta Megaswara Televisi) was made as the operator of Kompas TV and the parent of its network throughout Indonesia (previously, there was an attempt to create a new legal entity under PT Kompas TV Media Televisi and administered its licences, but it could not be realised and instead reused as the legal entity of its Gorontalo station). Actually, Kompas TV since 2012 had formally adopted networked stations system (under Kepmenkominfo No. 194/KEP/M.KOMINFO/04/2012 dated 9 April 2012), but its parent station was TVB (now Kompas TV Central Java) in Semarang.

On 28 June 2015, Kompas TV in Jakarta officially moved to 25 UHF, while TV Plus! changed its name into MGSTV, which broadcasts on 32 UHF. Following this frequency change, it hoped an increase of broadcasting quality, so that Kompas TV could increase its rating. Meanwhile, unlike KTV which later separated from its network, slowly since 2014, all member stations of its network (except RBTV (Yogyakarta)) changed their names to Kompas TV + province name, indicating its change from a content provider to a proper television network. It was estimated in 2016 that 30 local TV stations had become the members of Kompas TV network.

Initially, Kompas TV programming took emphasis on entertainment shows, especially those with educative and localised values, previously initiated by Indra Yudhistira. Because of this, its programming was dominated by documentaries, talk shows, edutainment, quiz shows, and others. Despite that, Kompas TV also had a larger proportion of news broadcasts than most other TV networks at that time. After receiving satisfying results, Kompas TV also tried airing other programmes, such as sports. In 2013, Kompas TV obtained broadcasting rights for Bundesliga (only for 2013–15 seasons and 2014–15 Serie A through cooperation with beIN Sports. Kompas TV had also aired the 2012–13 seasons of Formula One through cooperation with Fox Sports Asia and also broadcasting rights for other sport tournaments such as badminton, volleyball, and others.

== Regional stations ==
Just hours before the launch of the channel in 2011, the Indonesian Broadcasting Commission announced that Kompas TV did not have a broadcasting license. In response, Kompas TV stated that the channel was merely a "content provider" and was not required to have a broadcast license because its content could be aired on regional and international channels. Kompas TV started its broadcast through local television networks in some Indonesian provinces. The local television networks initially featured 70% of local content and 30% of Kompas TV national programs, but the majority now air national programming. RBTV (Yogyakarta) is a notable exception, since it has resisted absorption into Kompas TV brand and is not under majority ownership by KG Media.

Other Indonesian cities were expected to follow by establishing local stations that relay Kompas broadcasts. Since 9 September 2011, Kompas TV has been available through these pay television networks (but excluding local programs):

- Accola Play
- Biznet Home
- CubMu
- First Media
- IndiHome/IndiHome TV
- Transvision
- K-Vision
- MNC Vision
- Nex Parabola
- Vision+
- Vidio

Kompas TV can also be viewed through satellite broadcasts from Telkom-4.

== Digital broadcasting ==
PT Gramedia Nusantara proposed digital TV broadcasting, but the government postponed approval pending completion of its National TV Digital Broadcasting Policy.

== Partnerships ==
In July 2019, Kompas TV formed a rebroadcasting partnership with BBC News Indonesia, allowing it to broadcast the BBC television programme Click to its Indonesian-speaking audiences.

== Visual identity ==
=== Slogan history ===
- Inspirasi Indonesia ("Indonesia's Inspiration"), 9 September 2011 – 28 January 2016
- Berita dan Inspirasi Indonesia ("News and Indonesia's Inspiration"), 28 January 2016 – 19 October 2017
- Independen, Terpercaya ("Independent, Reliable"), 19 October 2017 – present

=== Logo history ===
Logo used from 9 September 2011 to 19 October 2017

Logo used from 28 January 2016 to 19 October 2017

Logo used since 19 October 2017

== See also ==
- List of television stations in Indonesia
