= Kompas =

Indonesian daily newspaper published in Jakarta

- Amanat Hati Nurani Rakyat (The Mandate of People's Conscience)
- Type: Daily newspaper
- Format: Broadsheet
- Owner: PT Kompas Media Nusantara (Kompas Gramedia Group)
- Founder(s): P. K. Ojong; Jakob Oetama
- Editor-in-chief: Sutta Dharmasaputra
- Founded: 28 June 1965
- Ceased publication: 1965, 1978 (temporarily)
- Political alignment: Secular
- Language: Indonesian
- Headquarters: Kompas Gramedia Building; Jl. Palmerah Selatan 22–28 Central Jakarta 10270
- City: Jakarta
- Country: Indonesia
- Circulation: Average of 500,000
- Sister newspapers: Kontan
- ISSN: 0215-207X
- OCLC number: 12594358
- Website: kompas.id kompas.com

Kompas (lit. 'Compass') is an Indonesian national newspaper published in Jakarta, founded on 28 June 1965. It is published by PT Kompas Media Nusantara, which is part of Kompas Gramedia Group. The paper's head office is located at the Kompas Multimedia Towers, Tanah Abang, Central Jakarta. It is considered Indonesia's newspaper of record.

The paper manages an online portal, kompas.id, which contains updated news and the digital subscription version of the paper, while Kompas Gramedia also manages another editorially separated portal, kompas.com. Kompas is one of two newspapers in Indonesia audited by the International Federation of Audit Bureau of Circulations.

== History ==
General Ahmad Yani, then commander of the Indonesian Army, first suggested the paper to Frans Seda, a government minister and leader of the Catholic Party. Yani encouraged Seda to publish a newspaper representative of the Catholic Party faction to counter the communist propaganda spearheaded by the PKI.

Seda sounded out the idea to his friends, P.K. Ojong and Jakob Oetama. Ojong subsequently agreed to undertake the project, and Oetama became its first editor-in-chief. Later, the newspaper's mission was focused on becoming independent and free from any political factions.

The publication was initially named Bentara Rakyat (People's Herald). At President Sukarno's suggestion, it was renamed to Kompas after the direction-finding instrument.

Kompas began its publication on 28 June 1965 from an office in central Jakarta. Its circulation grew from an initial circulation of 4,800 copies in 1965 to around 500,000 in 2014. Since 1969, Kompas has been the largest national Indonesian-language newspaper in the country. Its circulation peaked in 2004 when its daily circulation reached 530,000 copies, and its Sunday edition reached 610,000 copies sold. There were about 2.25 million readers in all. In 2014, its circulation reached 507,000, with 66% circulating in Greater Jakarta.

Like many daily newspapers, Kompas contains three parts: a front section containing national and international news, a business and finance section, and a sports section.

Kompas featured the Panji Koming and Benny & Mice comic strips every Sunday until 2010.

In 1988, Kompas was the first newspaper to trial sending news stories via an internet connection when the internet was still unknown in Indonesia. The newspaper's sports division first delivered news via the internet in September 1988, covering the Seoul Olympics that year. In 1993, while covering the Southeast Asian Games in Singapore, Kompas was the first Indonesian newspaper to send a picture online.

On 14 September 1995, Kompas launched its internet news division and website, Kompas Online. Initially, the website used a .co.id domain before switching to a .com domain a year later. In 1998, Kompas Online was rebranded as Kompas Cyber Media and again in 2008 as Kompas.com. Aside from the rebranding, the internet news division still uses the www.kompas.com domain to this day.

== Circulation ==
Kompas began its first issue with a circulation of 4,800 copies. In 2004, daily circulation reached 530,000 copies, and the special Sunday edition reached 610,000 copies. Kompas's print edition had an average circulation of 500,000 copies per day, and the average number of readers reached 1,850,000 people per day.

The paper is distributed throughout Indonesia. With an average circulation of 500,000 copies per day and reaching 600,000 copies for the Sunday edition, Kompas has the largest circulation of any newspaper in Southeast Asia. Kompas was the first print media in Asia to create a digital newspaper version for the iPad.

== Regional sections ==
The first regional section included in the paper was for East Java in 2003, followed by Central Java, Yogyakarta, West Java, and two other Sumatran regional sections. However, in January 2011, the newspaper closed down regional sections and returned to a uniform edition nationwide. No clear reason was given for the action.
