= Trisakti Museum =

Museum in West Jakarta, Indonesia

Coordinates: 6.168471°S 106.789090°E

Trisakti University 12 May 1998 Tragedy Museum
- Museum Tragedi 12 Mei 1998 Universitas Trisakti
- Location: Dr. Sjarif Thajeb Building, Trisakti University, Grogol Petamburan, West Jakarta, Jakarta, Indonesia
- Type: History museum
- Owner: Trisakti University
- Public transit access: Grogol; Grogol Reformasi

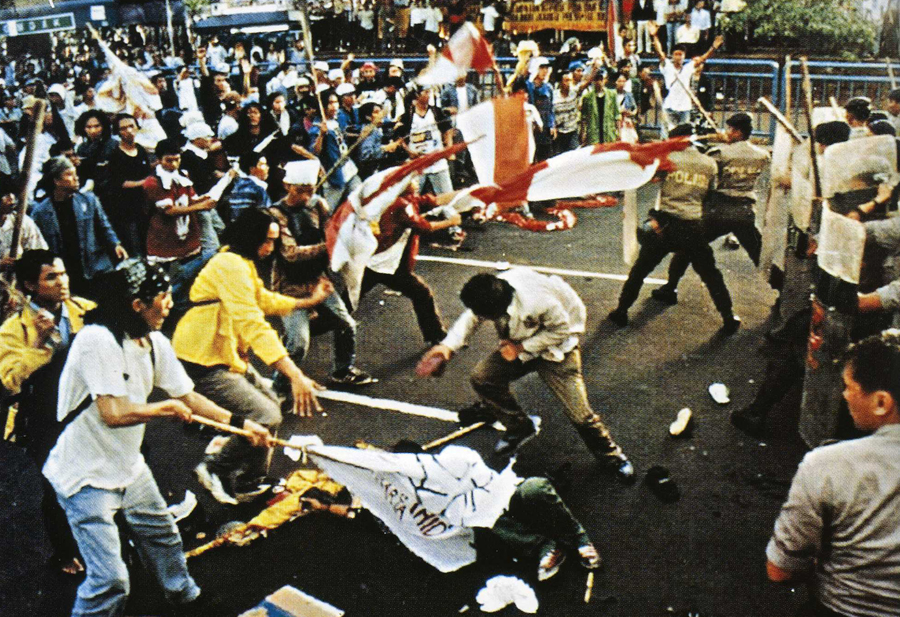
Trisakti University students clashing with police forces during the Indonesian riots of May 1998.

Trisakti Museum or May 12 Tragedy Museum is a human rights museum in Jakarta, Indonesia. The museum documents the active role of Indonesian students at Trisakti University in fighting for democracy and human rights.

The museum briefly tells about four students who were shot on May 12, 1998. In the museum there are short articles, a collection of news from newspapers, ornaments, demonstration photographs, photographs of the deceased, and their relics.

== History ==
Trisakti Museum was established with the background of the Indonesian university student movement in 1998, when the students across Indonesia rallied to demand reform.

The students at Trisakti University, as a part of the students in Indonesia as a whole, participated in a peaceful protest movement. The movement reach its peak when four students at Trisakti University were killed on May 12, 1998. This incident triggered the fall of Suharto.

To commemorate the tragedy, the museum was placed in the lobby of the Dr Syarif Thajeb building, on the campus of Trisakti University, Grogol, West Jakarta.

== See also ==
- Indonesian Revolution of 1998
- Trisakti shootings
- List of museums and cultural institutions in Indonesia
