= Putih Sari =

Indonesian politician (born 1984)

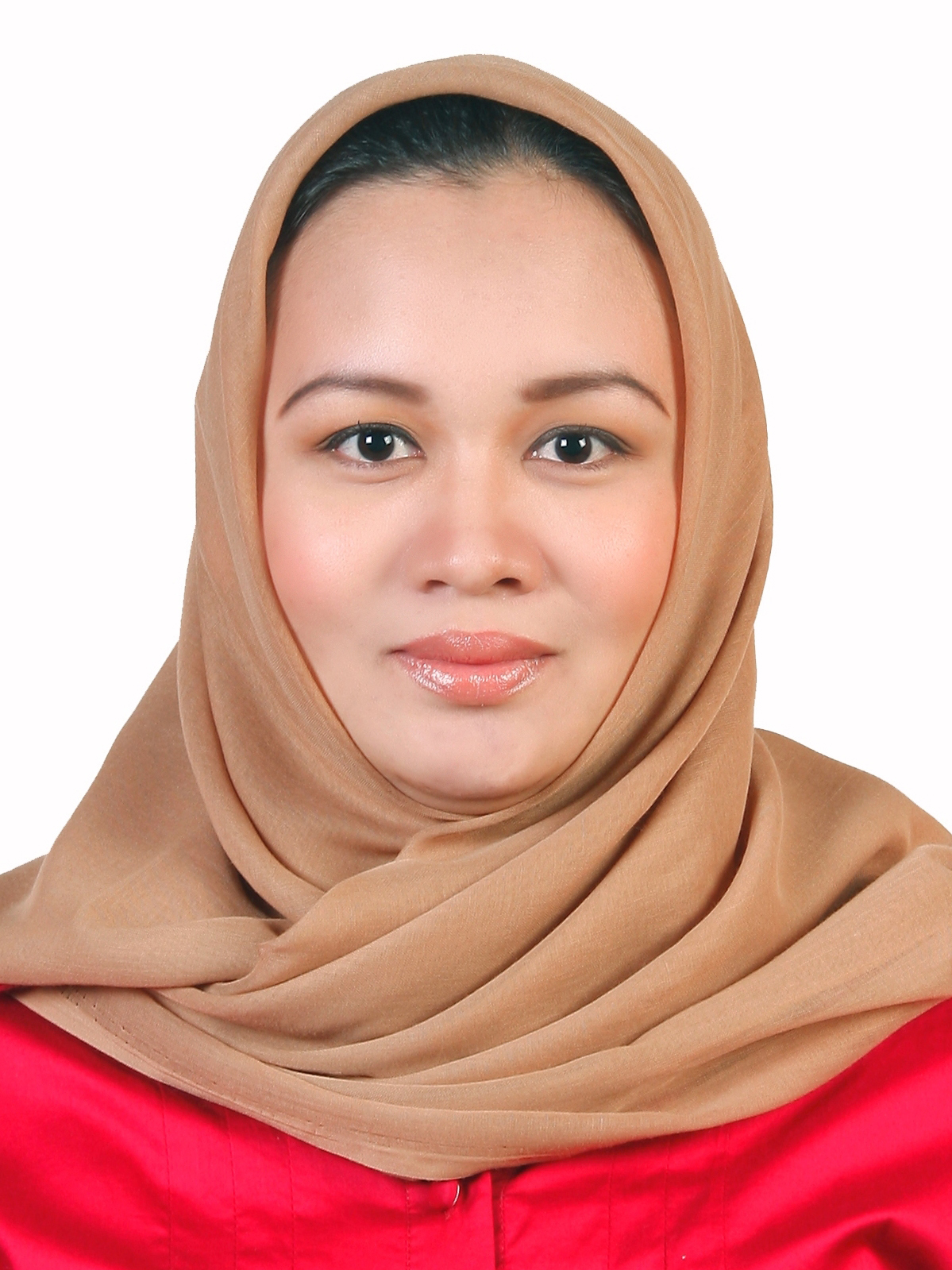
- Born: 20 July 1984; Jakarta
- Education: Trisakti University
- Occupation: Politician
- Political party: Gerindra Party

Putih Sari (born in Jakarta, 20 July 1984) is an Indonesian politician and legislator. She became a member of the Indonesian Parliament for the Gerindra Party in the national electoral district West Java VII. She was part of Commission IX (health, employment and population) of the DPR.

In May 2020, she condemned the increase of BPJS Kesehatan contributions for non-wage workers by the Jokowi government. She said to increase premiums during the COVID-19 pandemic in Indonesia is not wise, untimely and should be reviewed for alternative ways.

In 2020, she wrote an op-ed warning that the COVID-19 has taken away the focus away from the tuberculosis crisis by diverting emergency wards, resources and health workers to the Covid-19 response. She stated that immediate action is necessary to maintain the existing TB infrastructure. She was reelected for a second term in the 2024 election with 111,118 votes.

== Early life ==
She was born in Jakarta and completed high school at SMA Negeri 42 Jakarta. Her father was Haryanto Taslam, a prominent political activist who was kidnapped in 1998 during the pro-democracy movement. She went on to study dentistry at Trisakti University. Even before graduating in 2011, she ran in the 2009 Indonesian legislative election and became a member of the People's Consultative Assembly with only 25 years of age. She is part of Gerindra's women's wing PIRA (Perempuan Indonesia Raya, Great Indonesia Woman).
