= Trisakti shootings =

1998 Indonesian Army killings in Indonesia

- Part of the May 1998 riots of Indonesia
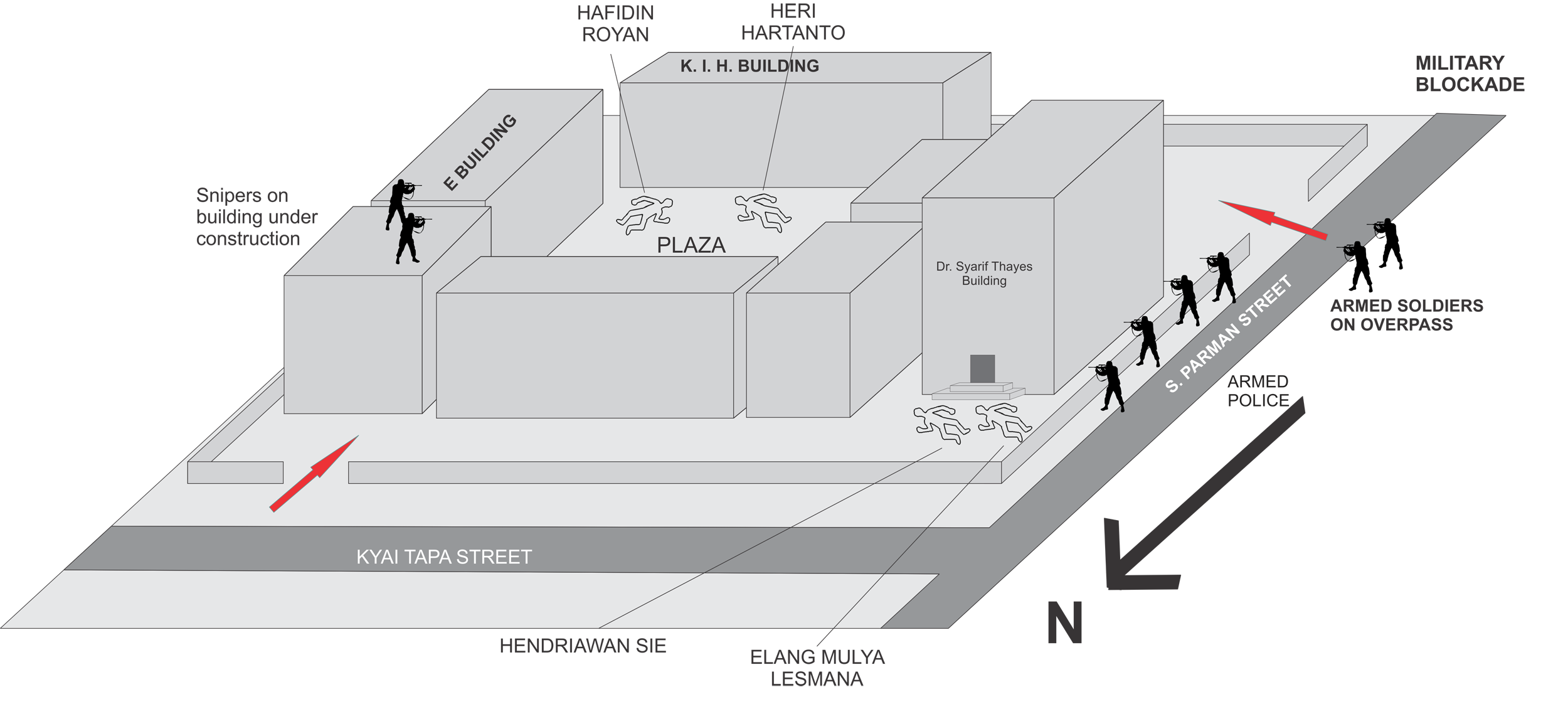
- A rough outline of the situation at Trisakti University during the shootings
- Location: 6.1675°S 106.79°E; Jakarta, Indonesia
- Date: 12 May 1998; 28 years ago
- Target: Students at Trisakti University
- Deaths: 4
- Injuries: 15
- Perpetrator: Indonesian Army

The Trisakti shootings, also known as the Trisakti tragedy (Indonesian: Tragedi Trisakti), took place at Trisakti University, Jakarta, Indonesia, on 12 May 1998. At a demonstration demanding President Suharto's resignation, Indonesian Army soldiers opened fire on unarmed protestors. Four students, Elang Mulia Lesmana, Heri Hertanto, Hafidin Royan, and Hendriawan Sie, were killed and dozens more were injured. The shootings triggered a riot and nationwide revolutionary wave, leading to Suharto's resignation later the same month.

== Background ==
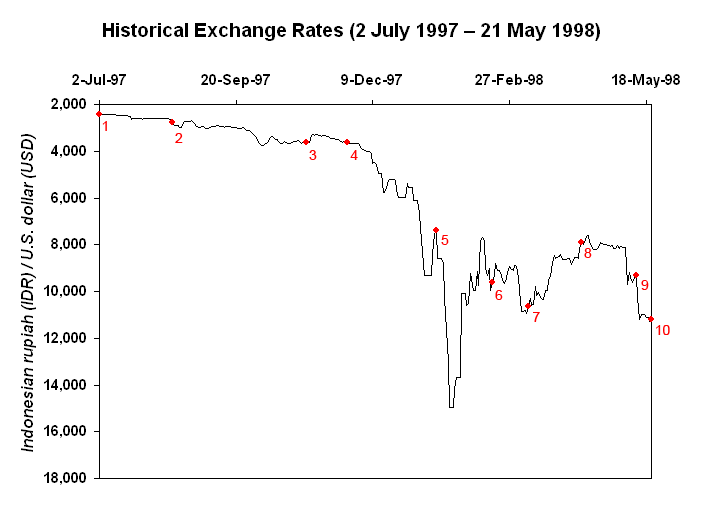
The exchange rate of the Rupiah plummeted during the 1997 Asian financial crisis

The economy of Indonesia suffered in 1997 and 1998 due to the 1997 Asian financial crisis. The value of the Indonesian rupiah plummeted, with a record exchange rate of 2,682 rupiah per United States dollar by 13 August 1997 and continuing to fall.

By 1998, hundreds of students from universities across the country were demonstrating calling for President Suharto's resignation. A demonstration on 16 May 1998 at the Bandung Institute of Technology saw 500 demonstrators, and by March, larger demonstrations had occurred at the University of Indonesia and Gadjah Mada University. On 9 May 1998, a police officer, Dadang Rusmana, was reported to have been killed at a demonstration at Djuanda University.

== Demonstrations and shootings ==
A planned non-violent protest against the Suharto government started at Trisakti University on 12 May 1998. By 10 a.m. WIB, over 6,000 students, lecturers, and staff had assembled in the university parking lot. The demonstrators began by lowering the Indonesian flag to half mast.

As noon approached, protestors prepared for a "long march" to the People's Representative Council Building (Indonesian: Gedung DPR/MPR). A few hundred metres from the campus, they were stopped by the Indonesian National Police in front of the West Jakarta Mayor's Office. In response, the protestors conducted a sit-in, completely blocking Letjen S. Parman Avenue. Military reinforcements for the police arrived not long after. At 3:30 p.m., Dean of the Faculty of Law Adi Andojo convinced the demonstrators to return to the Trisakti campus.

By that time, the security forces on-site at the time were the Police Mobile Brigade Corps, 9th Cavalry Battalion, 203rd Infantry Battalion, Kostrad Air Defence Artillery Battalion, 202nd Infantry Battalion, Kodam Jaya riot squad, and a motorised brigade. They were equipped with riot shields, tear gas, Steyr AUGs, and Pindad SS-1s.

By 5 p.m., most of the demonstrators had returned to the campus. Insults were then heard coming from the military and police; not long afterwards, they opened fire, causing the protestors to panic and scatter. Two students, Elang Mulya Lesmana and Hendriawan Sie, were shot and killed while attempting to enter the rectorate in the Dr. Syarif Thayeb building. During the shooting, Ganjar Pranowo was visiting the campus and witnessed a youth burning a truck in front of the gate. He then helped a journalist who was injured by gunfire.

An hour later, students who had not taken refuge within university buildings congregated in the open central plaza. Soldiers perched on the nearby rooftops continued shooting, wounding more students and killing another two, Heri Hartanto and Hafidin Royan. At roughly 8 p.m., the shootings stopped and the wounded were rushed to nearby hospitals.

At 10 p.m., Adi Andojo announced at a press conference broadcast live on the campus radio station MS3 FM that four students had been killed, and released their names.

Although the military has denied using live ammunition, autopsy reports indicated that the students had been shot with live rounds from a distance.

== Victims ==
Four Trisakti students, all men, were killed in the gunfire:

=== Elang Mulia Lesmana ===
Elang Mulia Lesmana (5 July 1978 – 12 May 1998) was a student at the Faculty of Architecture. On-campus, he was known for his humour, and during the demonstration was waving a sign saying "Lower the price of photocopies and perfume!" (Indonesian: "Turunkan harga fotokopi dan minyak wangi!"). He was shot outside the Dr. Syarif Thayeb building and buried in Tanah Kusir Public Cemetery, South Jakarta.

=== Heri Hertanto ===
Heri Hertanto (c. 1977 – 12 May 1998) was a student at the Faculty of Engineering. He was not known to be politically active. He was shot in the plaza near the Dr. Syarif Thayeb building, not far from Hafidin Royan. He was also buried in Tanah Kusir Public Cemetery, South Jakarta.

=== Hafidin Royan ===
Hafidin Royan (28 September 1976 – 12 May 1998) was a student at the Faculty of Civil Engineering, known amongst peers for being a devout Muslim. During the demonstration he had been standing in one of the back rows, clapping his hands. He was shot through the head in the plaza near the Dr. Syarif Thayeb building, not far from Heri Hertanto. He was buried in Sinargalih Cemetery, Bandung on 13 May 1998.

=== Hendriawan Sie ===
Hendriawan Sie Lesmana (3 May 1978 – 12 May 1998) was a student at the Faculty of Economics. He was shot outside the Dr. Syarif Thayeb building and later buried in Al Kamal Public Cemetery, West Jakarta.

== Aftermath ==
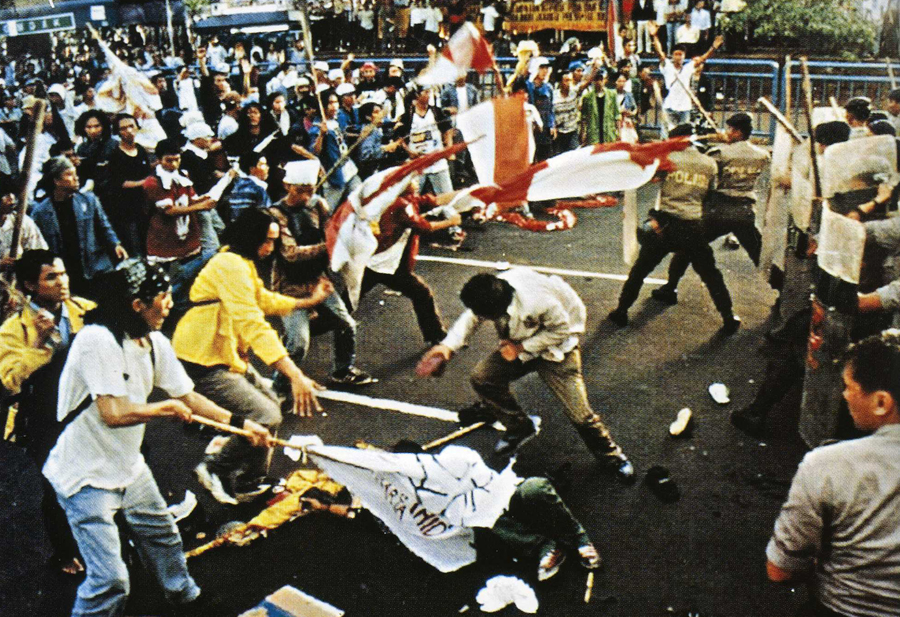
Trisakti University students and police forces clash in May 1998.

Public outrage against the shootings became a catalyst for the Indonesian riots of May 1998, which included a pogrom against Chinese-Indonesians. Approximately 1,200 people were killed, mostly trapped inside buildings that were set alight. As a result of the riots and similar ones nationwide, President Suharto resigned on 21 May 1998. Suharto's successor, B. J. Habibie, called Elang Mulia Lesmana, Heri Hertanto, Hafidin Royan, and Hendriawan Sie "reform heroes".

=== Investigation ===
In November 2000, it was announced that the eleven officers suspected of involvement would be summoned for questioning by military police. By year's end, however, none of the suspects had been questioned.

The Indonesian National Commission on Human Rights (Indonesian: Komisi Nasional Hak Asasi Manusia) reopened the investigation in 2008 and submitted their findings to the Indonesian Attorney General's Office. The Attorney General's Office declared the investigation incomplete and returned all documentation.

As of May 2011, the Indonesian government had not closed the investigation into the events or punished any of those responsible, even though there have been demonstrations, rallies, and calls for expedition in 2008, 2010, and 2011. The Deputy Attorney General of Indonesia, Darmono, promised to investigate the incident further.

=== Museum ===
Trisakti Museum, also known as May 12 Tragedy Museum, was established at Trisakti University in commemoration of the incident.

== Notes ==
1. Original: "Tragedi [Trisakti] telah memicu kerusuhan massa di Jakarta dan sejumlah kota lainnya pada 13–15 Mei 1998 dan aksi pendudukan mahasiswa di Gedung MPR/DPR sehingga Presiden Soeharto mengundurkan diri dari jabatannya.".
  Translation: "[The Trisakti shootings] caused widespread riots in Jakarta and other cities between 13 and 15 May 1998 as well as a sit-in of the People's Representative Council Building, to the point President Suharto had to resign from his position."
