= Trisakti University =

University in Jakarta, Indonesia

Universitas Trisakti
- Universitas Trisakti
- Motto: Takwa, Tekun, Terampil; Asah, Asih, Asuh; Satria, Setia, Sportif (Indonesian)
- Motto in English: Devotion, Diligence, Skill; Education, Nurture, Guidance; Nobility, Loyalty, Sportsmanship.
- Type: Private
- Established: 1965
- Rector: Prof. Dr. Ir. Kadarsah Suryadi, DEA
- Faculty: 902
- Students: 23,149
- Location: Jakarta, Indonesia; 06°10′03″S 106°47′24″E
- Campus: Urban A campus (Main) B campus (Medical and Dentistry) F campus (Economics) Sentul City campus (Economics)
- Colors: Blue
- Website: trisakti.ac.id

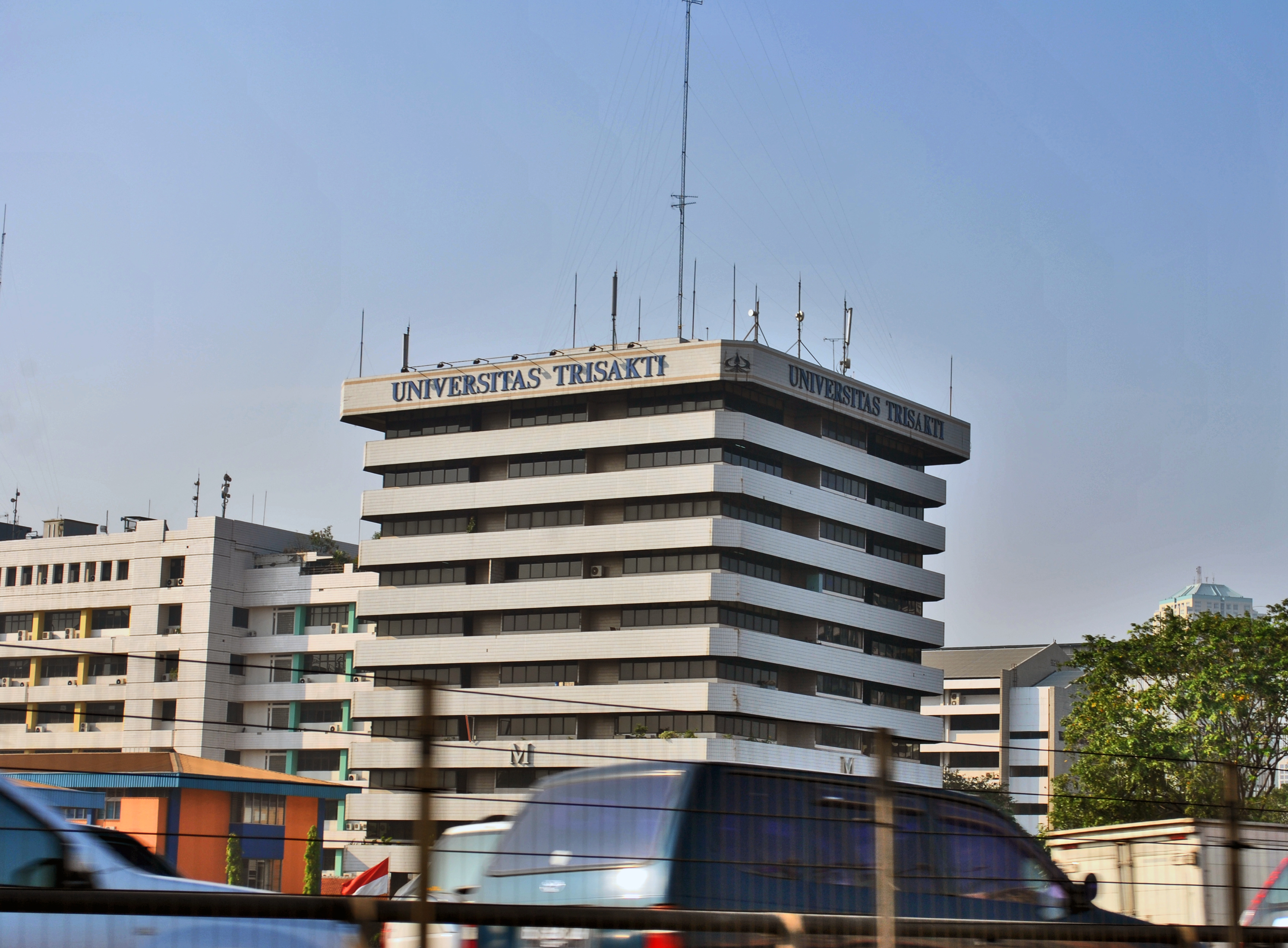
Campus building

Universitas Trisakti (Usakti, Trisakti) is a private university located in Jakarta, Indonesia. Founded on 29 November 1965, the university has more than 20,000 active students and has produced more than 100,000 alumni. Universitas Trisakti currently employs 742 tenured faculty members (82%) and 160 part-time lecturers (18%).

== History ==
=== Baperki University (1958–1962) ===
In 1958, Res Publica University was established as Baperki University by Baperki, an organization of Indonesians of Chinese descent.

=== Res Publica University (1962–1965) ===
The name "University Res Publica" was taken from a presidential address delivered by President Sukarno, and means "for the public interest". The school was destroyed after the attempted coup in Indonesia, Baperki banned, and Universitas Trisakti established to replace the destroyed university. Many former students were banned over allegations of ties to the Indonesian Communist Party (PKI).

=== Universitas Trisakti (1965–onwards) ===
There were originally five faculties at Universitas Trisakti:

- Faculty of Engineering with five departments (Mechanical Engineering, Electrical Engineering, Civil Engineering Architecture and Fine Arts)
- Faculty of Dentistry
- Faculty of Medicine
- Faculty of Economics with two subjects (Economics and Accounting)
- Faculty of Law and Knowledge Society

Since 1980, several additional faculties were established to cope with fast technological development in Indonesia. The university currently has nine faculties.

==== 1998 military shootings ====
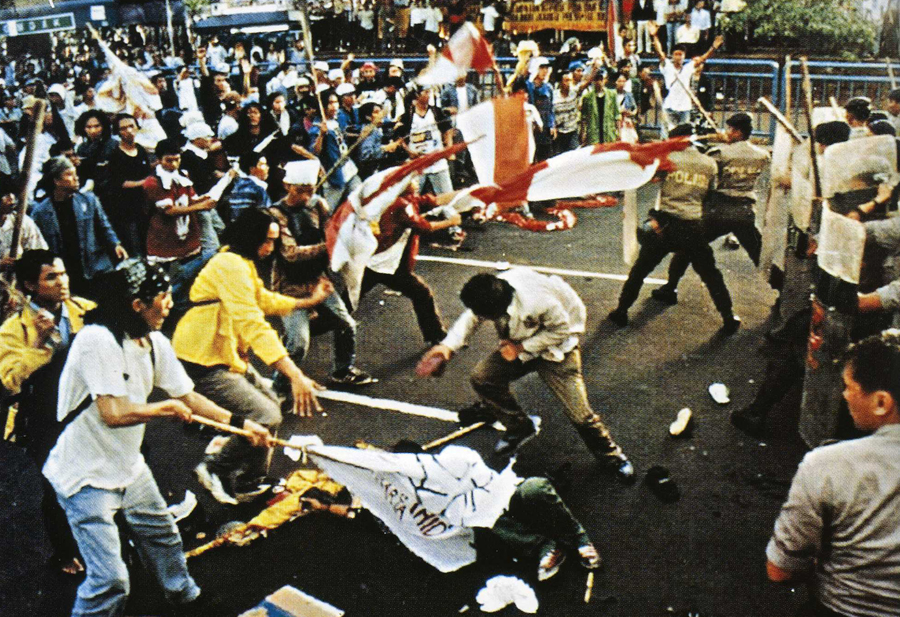
Universitas Trisakti students clash with police forces during the Indonesian riots of May 1998.

The Trisakti shootings occurred at Universitas Trisakti on 12 May 1998. At a demonstration demanding President Suharto's resignation, soldiers opened fire on unarmed protestors. Four students were killed and dozens more were injured. The shootings contributed to widespread student unrest and rioting during the Indonesian Revolution of 1998, which led to the resignation of President Suharto.

The Trisakti Museum was established in commemoration of the incident.

== Building and locations ==
Trisakti has several campuses around Jabodetabek.

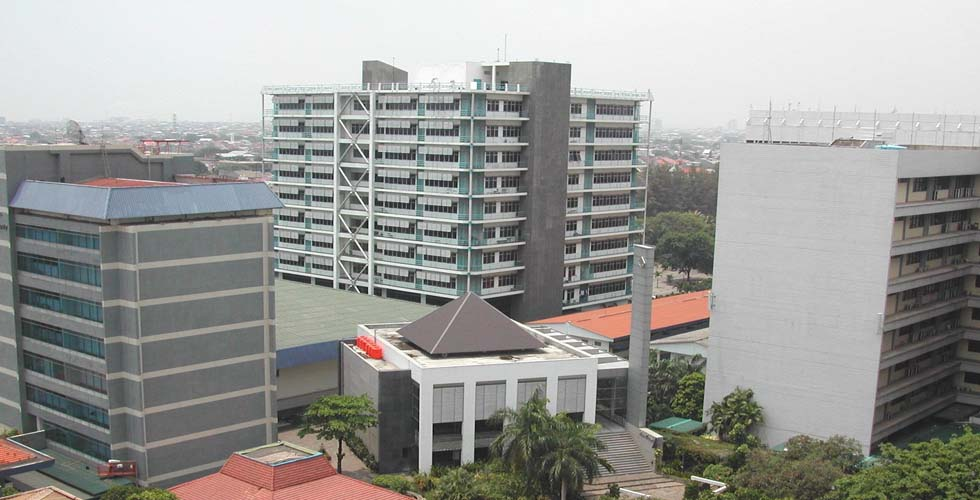
University buildings at campus A, Jakarta

=== Jakarta campuses ===
- A Campus is the main campus, located at Jl. Kyai Tapa no. 1 Grogol Jakarta Barat 11440. Administrative Center (Rektorat), Faculty of Law, Faculty of Economics, Faculty of Civil Engineering and Planning, Faculty of Industrial Technology, Faculty of Mineral Technology, Faculty of Landscape Architecture and Environmental Technology, Faculty of Arts and Design, and Graduate School Programs.
- B Campus, located at Jl. Kyai Tapa Kav 262 Grogol Jakarta Barat 11440. Faculty of Medical Sciences and Faculty of Dentistry.
- C Campus, located at Jl. A. Yani (By Pass) Kav. 85, Rawasari, Jakarta Timur 13210.
- D Campus, located at Jl. IKPN Tanah Kusir Bintaro Jakarta Selatan 12330. This is the main campus of Sekolah Tinggi Pariwisata Trisakti (STPT).
- F Campus, located at Jl. Jenderal Ahmad Yani No 107 By Pass, Rawasari, Jakarta Timur 13210. This campus has another part of Faculty of Economics.
- G Campus, located at Jl. Kyai Tapa no. 100 Grogol Jakarta Barat 11440. Trisakti Medical Center and some lecture halls for Faculty of Medical Sciences.

=== West Java campus ===
- Nagrak campus is the largest campus (124 ha), located at Jl. KH. Rafei-Alternatif Cibubur, Km 6, Bogor 16968. Temporary Management Office, Center of Science Technology and Community Development (CSTCD).

== Faculties ==
The university has nine faculties:

- Faculty of Law
- Faculty of Medical Sciences
- Faculty of Dentistry
- Faculty of Economics and Business
  - Department of Accounting
  - Department of Management
  - Department of Economics
- Faculty of Civil Engineering and Planning
  - Department of Civil Engineering
  - Department of Architecture
- Faculty of Industrial Technology
  - Department of Mechanical Engineering
  - Department of Electrical Engineering
  - Department of Industrial Engineering
  - Department of Informatics and Information Systems
- Faculty of Earth Technology and Energy
  - Department of Petroleum Engineering
  - Department of Geology Engineering
  - Department of Mining Engineering
- Faculty of Landscape Architecture and Environmental Technology
  - Department of Landscape Architecture
  - Department of Environmental Engineering
  - Department of Regional and City Planning
- Faculty of Arts and Design
  - Department of Photography
  - Department of Interior Design
  - Department of Product Design
  - Department of Cinematography

== Academic profile ==
=== Reputation and recognition ===
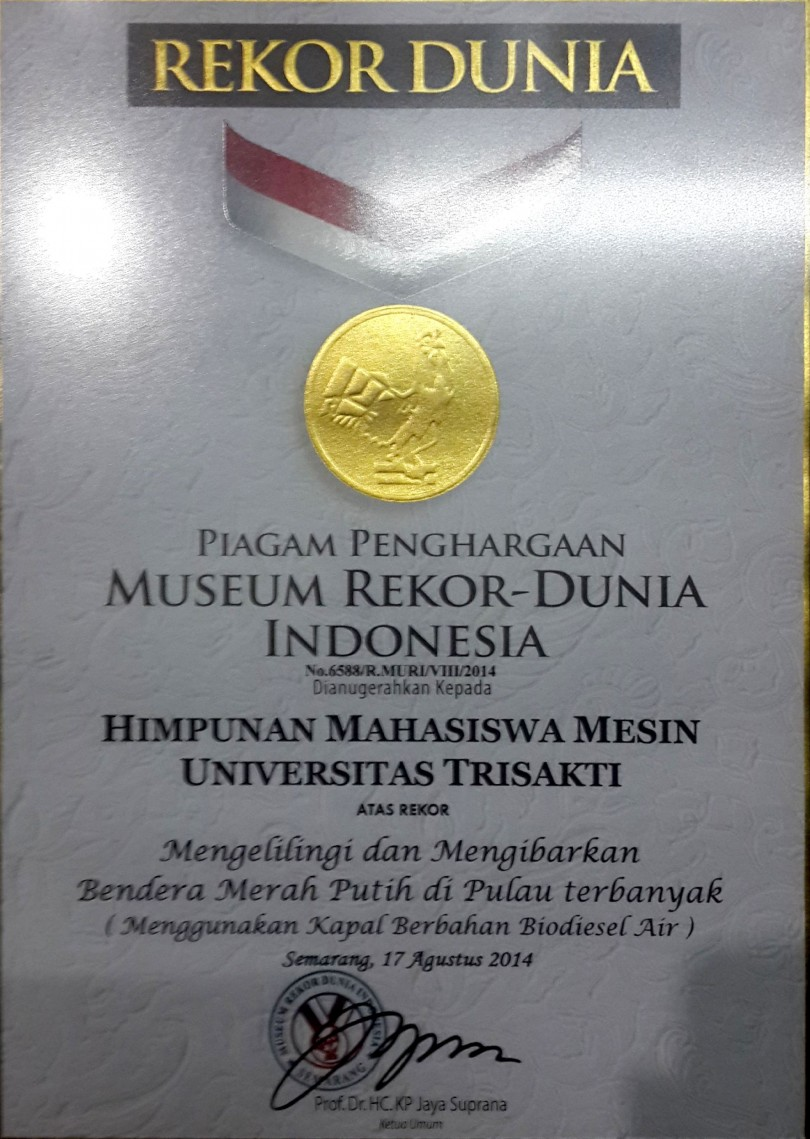
Indonesian World Records Museum certificate for Universitas Trisakti's Mechanical Engineering Department, which successfully toured 69 islands in Indonesia, uses a water-in-diesel-fueled fishing boat.

International recognition of the visible courses from Universitas Trisakti has held:

- Double Degree Bachelor Program on 12 courses with Indiana-Purdue University Indianapolis, US; University of Missouri St. Louis, US; Curtin University, Sydney, Australia; Hogeschool Utrecht, Utrecht, The Netherlands; Northampton University, United Kingdom, Koffie Annan Business School, The Netherlands, Saxion University of Applied Science of The Netherlands, Curtin University, Perth Western Australia, Inholland University of Applied Science The Netherlands.
- Double Degree Master of Management at the Maastricht School of Management, the Netherlands, Markfield Institute of Higher Education UK, La Trobe University in Australia, Prince of Songkla University Thailand, United Emirates University, and the Asian Institute of Management in the Philippines.
- International Class Doctoral Program with the Maastricht School of Management Netherlands, Colorado State University, US, Markfield Institute of Higher Education UK, La Trobe University in Australia.

In addition, the Faculty of Medicine of Universitas Trisakti, the result of Indonesia physician competency test (UKDI) is very good, with average passing grade to 90% equal annually with other faculty of medicine in leading universities such as University of Indonesia, Gadjah Mada University, and Airlangga University. The Faculty of Medicine Universitas Trisakti is the one and only faculty of medicine which currently the graduates own certificate from the Center of Work Development and Hiperkes, so that the graduates of the Faculty of Medicine Universitas Trisakti can directly work in the companies.

Universitas Trisakti lecturers are also trusted from the National Accreditation of University Board – Ministry of National Education is marked by the appointment of 15 tenured faculties of the faculty of the Universitas Trisakti to become national assessors. Some lecturers earn the trust as Assessor of Certification Expertise.

The uptake of the working world can be measured with the alumni position indicator, the waiting span to get a job, the suitability of science, and the recognition of user graduates. Based on the alumni search results year 2013/2014, data showed that the average waiting span to get a job for graduates is less than three months, and considered very good; and good on the attributes of integrity, professionalism, communication, cooperation, self-development, and IT skills ability. This achievement needs to be improved, especially in terms of suitability science.

Quality and quantity uptake world of work cannot be separated from the academic achievements in the form of hard skills and soft skills competence, as well as character development of Universitas Trisakti's graduates. Until the academic year 2013/2014, there are 104.247 graduates who occupy important positions in the country, such as Governor of Jakarta and the Chairman of the House of Representatives. Besides, there are alumni who work abroad, such as in America, Europe, Australia, Canada, Africa, Middle East, China, Malaysia and Singapore.

=== Research ===
In the field of research, in 2013 and 2014 Universitas Trisakti won the competition to obtain a grant from the Directorate of Research and Community Services, Dikti, total of 39 studies, with details MP3EI 2 studies, 3 Fundamental research grants, competitive grants: 11 studies, Leading Research Universities: 20 studies, RAPID: 1 and 2 studies Doctoral dissertation. Lecturers involved in 38 research over 120 lecturers of 742 lecturers at 16% overall. Additionally, obtained funds from outside of the ministry as much as Rp 283.400.000 and €18,156 or equivalent to Rp 290.496.000.

Universitas Trisakti also fund research conducted in each faculty lecturer in 216 studies, carried out by 277 lecturers and 70 students. So, the total of 252 research studies conducted at Rp 5.946.067.000. This amount has been far beyond the standard AIPT average amount of research funding per faculty per year to Rp 13 million (> Rp. 3 million). Although in terms of the amount of research still needs to be improved further.

The increase in the number and amount of research funding that can be obtained from the Dikti is possible because since 2012, in terms of research, Universitas Trisakti inserted into the top by the Dikti, which means that Universitas Trisakti has been appointed as the manager of the research program of decentralization of funds from Ditjen Dikti and have Internal Reviewer for that decentralization program.

Intellectual Property Rights (IPR) obtained Universitas Trisakti in the academic year of 2013/2014 amounted to 20. The good news in the field of research also occurred in the academic year 2013/2014 in which there is scientific papers presented at a national seminar were 58 papers and 18 papers at international seminars.

=== Community service ===
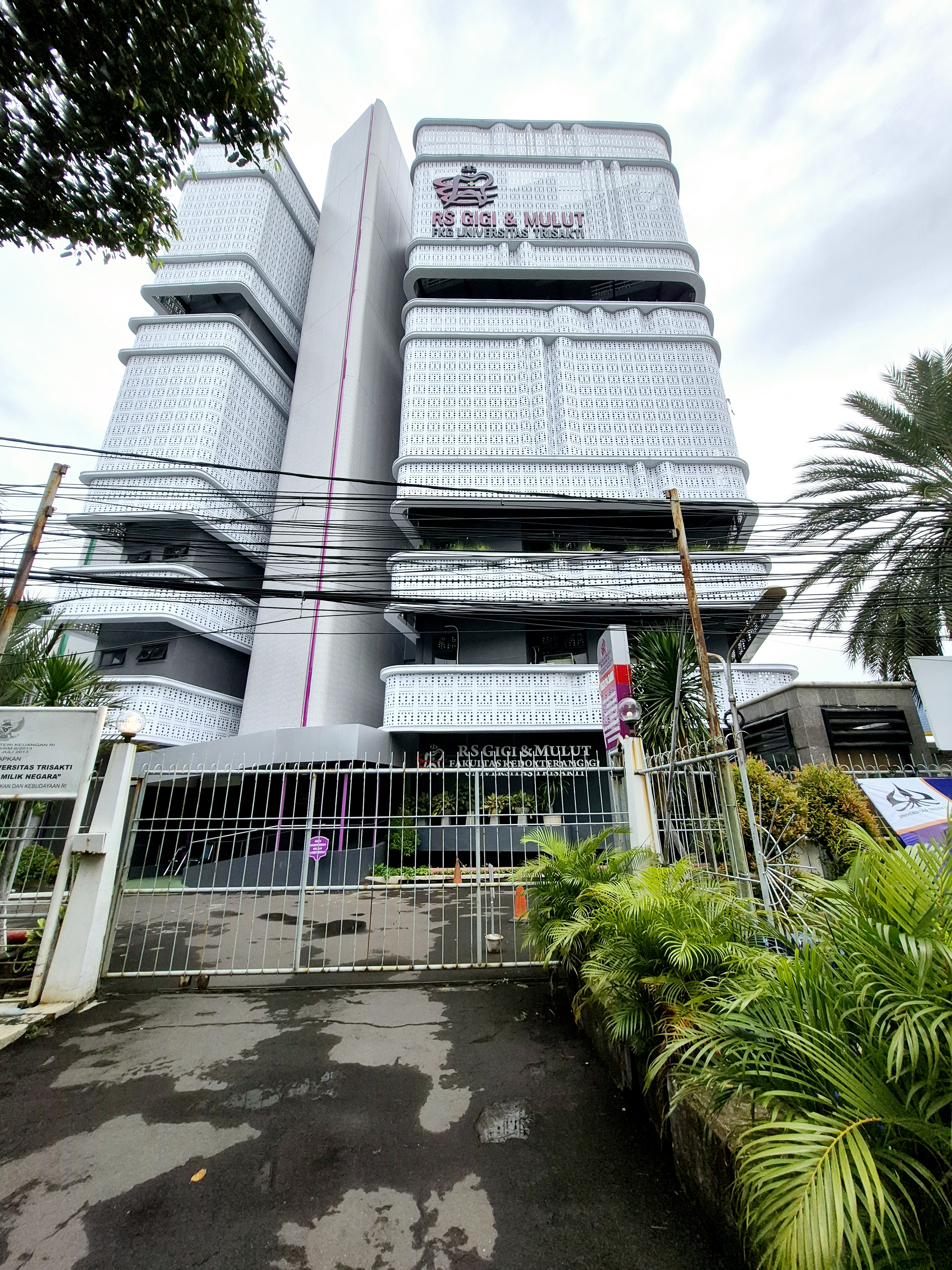
Trisakti Dental and Oral Hospital (RSGM Trisakti).

According to the vision and mission of the Institute of Community Services (LPKM), which refers to the vision and mission of the university, the purpose of LPKM is to support and accelerate the creation of a prosperous society and its environmental sustainability. During the academic year 2013/2014 Universitas Trisakti planned to implement the program amounted to 416 programs consisting of as many as 341 mono-discipline programs and multi-disciplinary program of 75 courses, or 115.2% of the plan, meaning there is an additional 15.2% as much as 55 activities. Lecturers involved in the implementation of the PKM program with a record number of 1.246 faculty lecturer can carry out more than one activity, while the number of students involved are 274 people.

Institute for Community Services is very responsive to emergency natural disasters that often occur in Jakarta, especially in Tambora Village, Bambu Utara Village, Tanjung Duren Utara Village, Jembatan Besi Village, Jati Pulo Village, Duri Pulo Village, Wijaya Kusuma Village, Jelambar Baru Village and Petojo Utara Village. In addition to regular PKM, there is also a working visit from Terengganu Malaysia University on 24–29 March 2014, chaired by Prof. Madya, Dr. Nur Azura Bt Sanusi.

The community service program is performed by students from various faculties / courses that exist in the scope Universitas Trisakti in the form of Independent Business Class program – Science Applied Technology (KUM-ITT). In the academic year 2013/2014 KUM-ITT program has been implemented in six villages locations of three districts in Pandeglang, Banten. KUM-ITT program was attended by 135 students who have passed the selection. The number of programs that have been implemented in KUM- ITT are 144 programs include 10 programs Applicable Technology (TTG) and other programs in the fields of law, health, economic, environmental, social, physical, and others.

Out of 77 multi-disciplinary programs, academic year 2013/2014 that work well and there is a link between the program with one another in terms of its integration in a multi-discipline in accordance with the substance of each well completion and management program implementation refers to the participation of technology.

At the international level, Community Services Institute cooperated with Colorado State University, especially in the field of Community Development.

== Notable alumni and academics ==
=== Notable alumni ===
==== Academics and scientists ====
- Ir. Henri Uranus, M.T., Ph.D. (Head of Electrical Engineering Department, Pelita Harapan University, Indonesia)
- Ir. Iman Herwidiana Kartowisastro, M.Sc., Ph.D. (Vice Rector Academic Development & Provost, Bina Nusantara University, Indonesia)
- Ir. Theresia Widya Suryaningsih, M.M. (First Rector, Bina Nusantara University, Indonesia)
- Prof. Wenny Rahayu (Head of School of Engineering and Mathematical Sciences, La Trobe University, Australia)

==== Business ====
- Ir. Bobby Gafur Umar, MBA (President Director of PT Maharaksa Biru Energi Tbk & former CEO of Bakrie & Brothers Tbk.)
- Andre Rosiade, S.E.

==== Lawyers ====
- Haris Azhar (Advocate, Director of Lokataru Foundation, Lecturer for law faculty of Universitas Trisakti and Sekolah Tinggi Hukum Jentera Indonesia, Head of Human Rights Division on Indonesian Bar Association, Former Coordinator of KontraS, Former of Executive Member of FORUM ASIA)
- Usman Hamid (Executive Director of Amnesty International Indonesia, Former Coordinator of Kontras)

==== Authors ====
- Dr. Marga Tjoa (Indonesian writer in popular romance and children's literature)
- Dr. Mira Widjaja (novelist)
- Dr. Nova Riyanti Yusuf (novelist, psychiatrist, member of People's Representative Council, 2009–2014)

==== Media and artists ====
- Griffiths Anna (TV actor)
- Lukman Sardi (actor)
- Bunga Citra Lestari (actress)
- Maria Harfanti (Miss Indonesia 2015)
- Alya Rohali (Puteri Indonesia 1996)
- Marissa Haque (actress)
- Hilbram Dunar (TV presenter)
- Sarah Sechan (actress)
- Pica Wiriahardja (newscaster)
- Ibrahim Imran (singer)
- Happy Salma (actress)
- Gista Putri (actor)
- Jessica Iskandar (actress)
- Igo Pentury (Winner Indonesian Idol 2010)
- Kerent Pagustian (Musicians)
- Arief Muhammad (novelist)
- Putri Titian (actress)
- Mira Widjaja (author)

==== Politicians ====
- Dr. H. Adhyaksa Dault, S.H., M.Si. (State Minister for Youth and Sport Affairs on United Indonesia Cabinet, 2004–2009)
- Ir. H. Alex Noerdin, S.H., (15th Governor of South Sumatra)
- M. Aziz Syamsuddin, S.E., S.H., MAF, M.H. (Head of Third Commission, People's Representative Council, 2014–2019)
- Ir. Basuki Tjahaja Purnama, M.M. (17th Governor of Jakarta)
- Dede Yusuf Macan Effendi, S.T. (Vice Governor of West Java province, 2008–2013)
- Primus Yustisio (DPR RI, 2009–current)
- Drg. Putih Sari (member of the Indonesia People's Representative Council)
- Drs. Setya Novanto, Ak. (speaker of the Indonesia People's Representative Council, 2014–2015)
- Yenny Wahid (Director of Wahid Institute)
- Wanda Hamidah (DPRD DKI Jakarta, 2009–2014)

==== Public servants ====
- Muhammad Sapta Murti, Deputy for Legislations, Ministry of State Secretariat of RI

==== Sport people ====
- Rudy Hartono (Badminton)
- Christian Ronaldo Sitepu (Basketball)

=== Notable academics ===
- Ir. Djiteng Marsudi (President Director of Perusahaan Listrik Negara, Indonesia, 1995–1998)
- Prof. Ir. Syamsir Abduh, MM, PhD (Member of National Energy Board, Indonesia)
- Sofyan Basir (President Director of Bank Negara Indonesia 2005–2010, President Director of Perusahaan Listrik Negara 2014-now)
- Ir. Hendra Santika, M.M (director of development Aneka Tambang ANTAM)
- Cahaya Dwi Rembulan Sinaga (Bank Mandiri commissioner)
- Pataniari Siahaan (Bank Negara Indonesia BNI commissioner)

== Symbol ==
In June 1966, Universitas Trisakti began using the symbol of a trident which was decided after holding a contest. The symbol is a refinement by Eko Purwoto, who was assigned to make improvements to the designs that came from the contest.

The trident logo covers:

- Political sovereignty
- Governmental economy
- Indonesian culture
