= Fall of Suharto =

1998 Indonesian presidential resignation

- Part of the 1997 Asian financial crisis and the Post-Suharto era in Indonesia
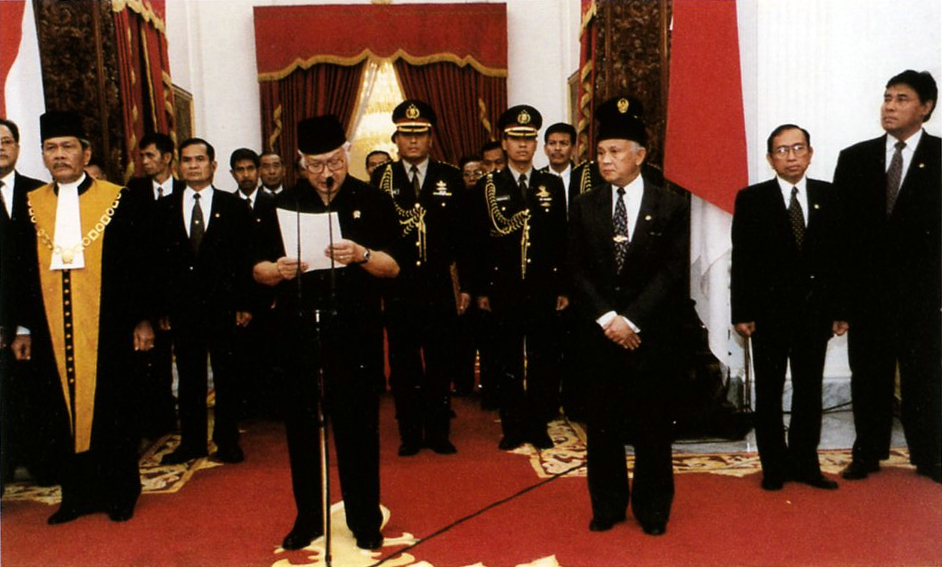
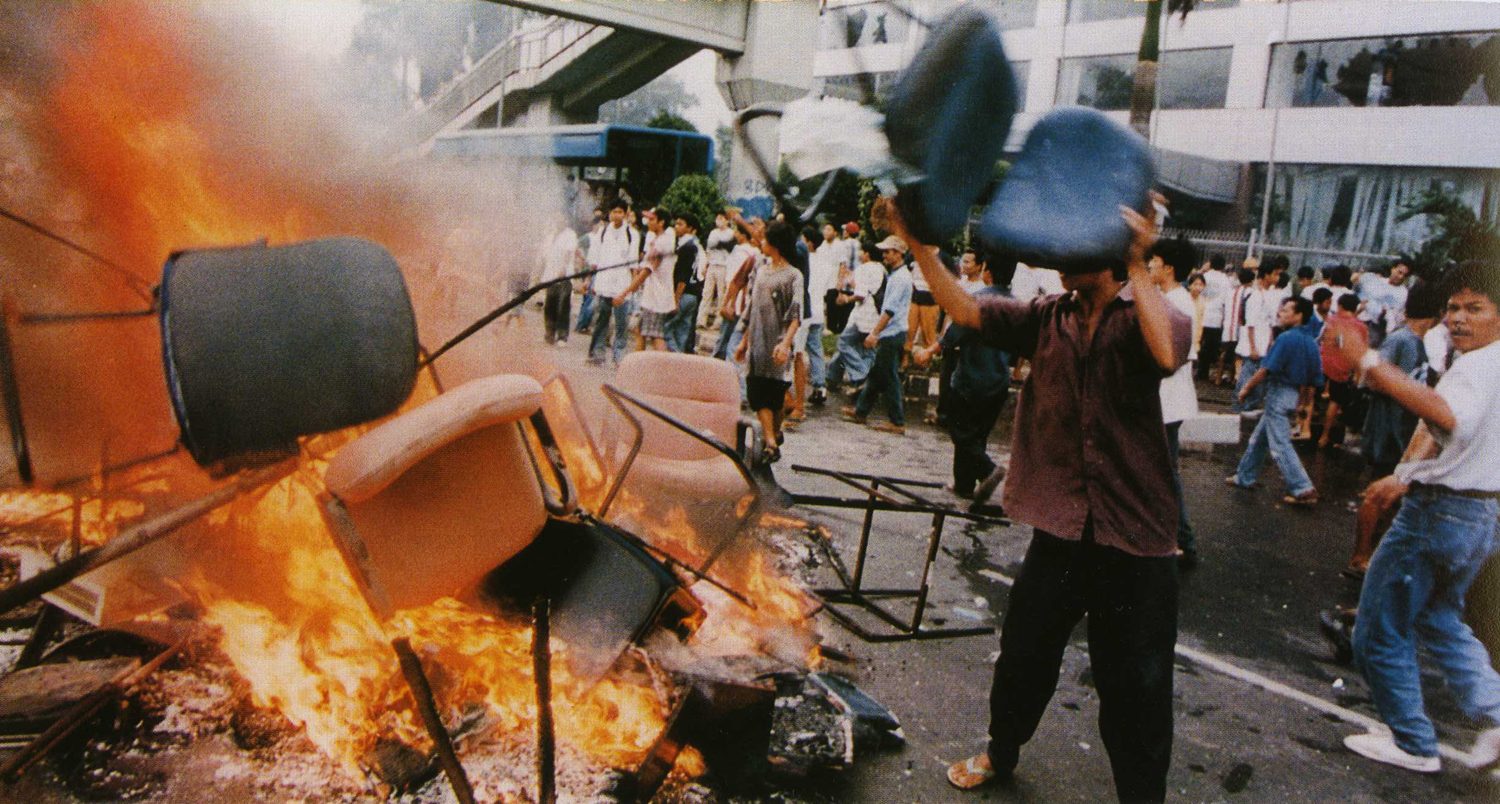
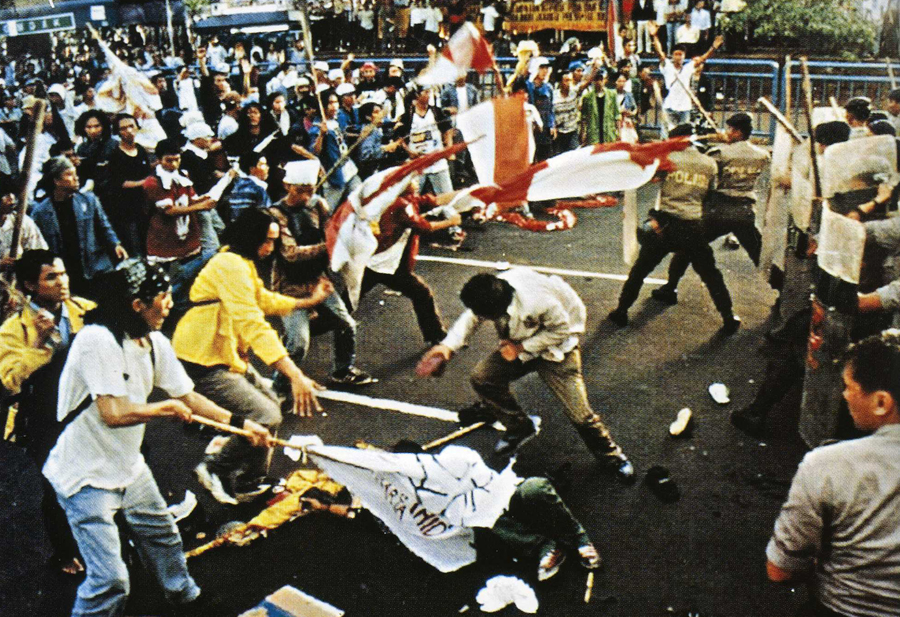
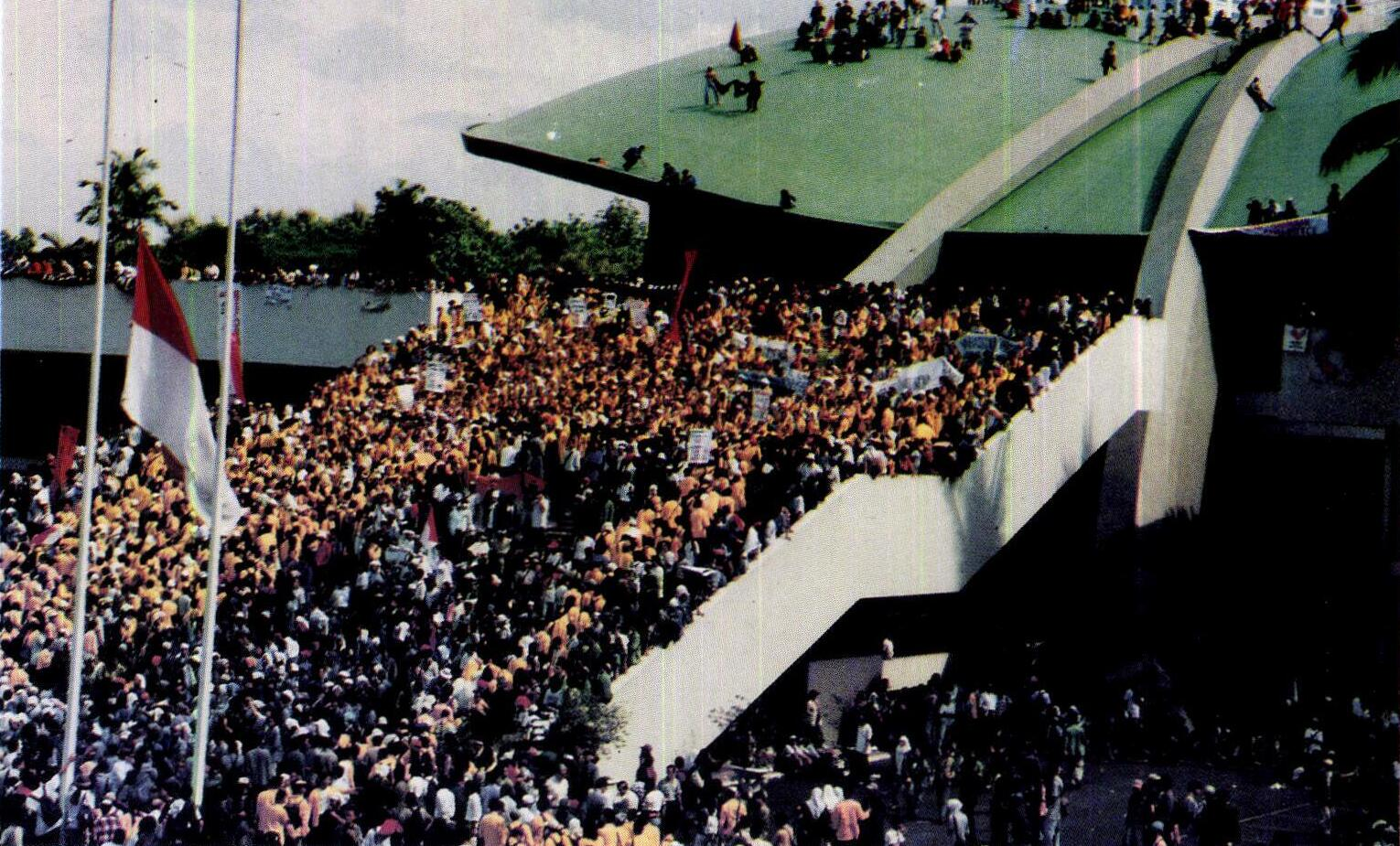
- Clockwise, from top: Indonesian president Suharto presenting his resignation from office; Rioters burning office furniture on the streets of Jakarta; Students occupying the MPR/DPR building; Trisakti University students and police forces clashing
- Date: 21 May 1998
- Location: Indonesia
- Result: Fall of the New Order: Resignation of Suharto as president; The inauguration of B. J. Habibie as Suharto's successor; Creation of the Development Reform Cabinet; Independence referendum for East Timor on 30 August 1999

Lead figures
(Indonesia) Suharto; (Indonesia) Feisal Tanjung; (Indonesia) Wiranto; (Indonesia) Prabowo Subianto; (Indonesia) Siti Hardiyanti Rukmana; Various other pro-Suharto politicians and generals	(Indonesia) Amien Rais; (Indonesia) Megawati Sukarnoputri; (Indonesia) Harmoko; (Indonesia) Taufiq Kiemas; Student leaders and other opposition politicians

The fall of Suharto refers to the resignation of Indonesian President Suharto on 21 May 1998, ending his 32‑year authoritarian rule under the New Order regime, which occurred following nationwide protests and severe economic collapse. His vice president, B. J. Habibie, assumed the presidency, launching a period of political reform known as Reformasi, which significantly transformed Indonesia's political institutions and ushered in democratic transition.

The fall of Suharto followed the 1997 Asian financial crisis, which triggered mass unrest and exposed rampant corruption under his administration. Student-led protests—sparked by events such as the July 1996 PDI office raid and the Trisakti shootings in May 1998—escalated into riots targeting the government and ethnic Chinese communities, particularly in Jakarta, Medan, and Surakarta.

The resignation precipitated the overthrow of the New Order's centralized power structure and began a Reformasi era characterized by institutional overhaul, increased civil liberties, and regional decentralization. Reforms included legal restructuring, electoral democracy and media liberalization. Indonesia's transition is frequently cited as a model of bottom-up democratic transformation in Southeast Asia.

== Historical background ==
=== Dissent during the New Order ===
Having consolidated power in 1967 in the aftermath of the attempted coup in 1965 which was launched by middle-ranking officers in the Indonesian army and air force but officially blamed on the Communist Party of Indonesia (PKI) resulting in purges, the government of Suharto adopted policies that severely restricted civil liberties and instituted a system of rule that effectively split power between the Golkar organisation and the military.

In 1970, price rises and corruption prompted student protests and an investigation by a government commission. Suharto responded by banning student protest, forcing the activists underground. Only token prosecution of cases recommended by the commission was pursued. The pattern of co-opting a few of his more powerful opponents while criminalising the rest became a hallmark of Suharto's rule.

Suharto stood for election by the People's Consultative Assembly every five years, beginning in 1973. According to his electoral rules, three entities were allowed to participate in the election: two political parties and Golkar. All other political parties were amalgamated into either the Islam-based United Development Party (PPP) or the nationalist Democratic Party of Indonesia (PDI). Golkar, Suharto's primary political vehicle, was officially not a political party. All senior civil servants were obliged to join employee associations linked to Golkar, while senior bureaucrats were banned from joining political parties. In a political compromise with the powerful military, Suharto banned its members from voting in elections but set aside seats in the legislature for their representatives. Suharto was unopposed in every election in which he stood (being 1973, 1978, 1983, 1988, 1993, and 1998).

In May 1980, a group called the Petition of Fifty (Petisi 50) demanded greater political freedoms and accused Suharto of misinterpreting the Pancasila state ideology. It was signed by former military men, politicians, academics and students. The Indonesian media suppressed the news, and the government placed restrictions on the signatories, some of whom were later jailed.

Following the end of the Cold War, Western concern over communism waned, and the West was less willing to tolerate Third World anti-Communist dictatorships. Consequently, Suharto's human rights record came under greater international scrutiny. In 1991, the murder of East Timorese civilians in a Dili cemetery, also known as the "Santa Cruz Massacre", caused US attention to focus on its military relations with the Suharto regime and the question of Indonesia's occupation of East Timor. In 1992, this attention resulted in the Congress of the United States passing limitations on IMET assistance to the Indonesian military, over the objections of US President George H. W. Bush. In 1993, under President Bill Clinton, the US delegation to the United Nations Human Rights Commission helped pass a resolution expressing deep concern over Indonesian human rights violations in East Timor.

=== The first cracks emerge ===
In 1996, the Indonesian Democratic Party (PDI), a legal party that had been used by the New Order as a benign prop for the New Order's electoral system, began to assert its independence under Megawati Sukarnoputri, the daughter of Indonesia's founding father, Sukarno. In response, Suharto attempted to foster a split over the leadership of the PDI, backing a co-opted faction loyal to deputy speaker of Parliament Suryadi against supporters of Megawati. After the Suryadi faction announced a party congress to sack Megawati would be held in Medan on 20–22 June, Megawati proclaimed that her supporters would hold demonstrations in protest. The Suryadi faction went through with the sacking, and the demonstrations manifested themselves throughout Indonesia.

Megawati's supporters then took over the PDI headquarters in Jakarta. On Saturday 27 July, a mob including soldiers in civilian clothing and thugs from the army-associated Pemuda Pancasila organization forcibly entered the building. According to the National Human Rights Commission, five people were killed, 149 injured and 74 missing – mostly from those arrested by the military. The attack was followed by two days of rioting, in which youths burned at least six buildings, including that of the Ministry of Agriculture. The political tensions in Jakarta were accompanied by anti-Chinese riots in Situbondo (1996), Tasikmalaya (1996), Banjarmasin (1997), and Makassar (1997); while violent ethnic clashes broke out between the Dayak and Madurese in West Kalimantan in 1997 during the Sanggau Ledo riots.

== Fall of Suharto ==
=== Monetary and financial crisis ===
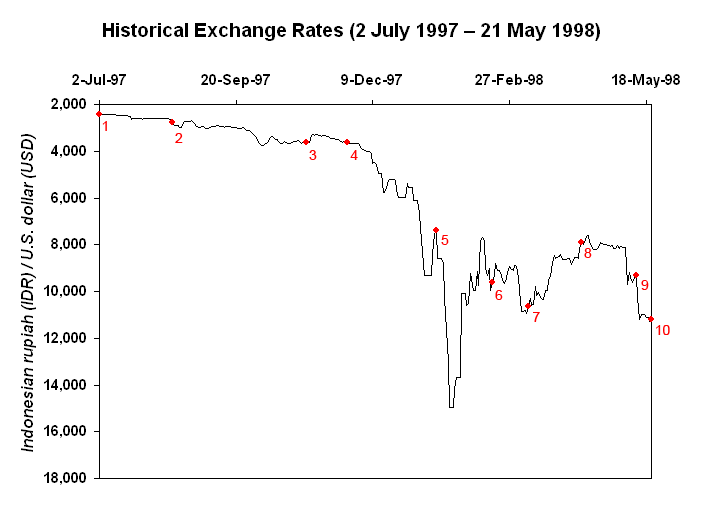
Indonesia followed the Kingdom of Thailand in abandoning the fixed exchange rate of its currency on 14 August 1997. The rupiah further devalued to its lowest point following the signing of the second IMF letter of intent on 15 January 1998.

In the second half of 1997, Indonesia became the country hardest hit by the 1997 Asian financial crisis. The economy suffered a flight of foreign capital leading to the Indonesian rupiah falling from Rp 2,600 per dollar in August 1997 to over Rp 14,800 per dollar by January 1998. Indonesian companies with US dollar-denominated borrowings struggled to service these debts with their rupiah earnings, and many went bankrupt. Efforts by Bank Indonesia to defend its managed float regime by selling US dollars not only had little effect on the currency's decline, but also drained Indonesia's foreign exchange reserves. Weaknesses in the Indonesian economy, including high levels of debt, inadequate financial management systems and crony capitalism, were identified as underlying causes. Volatility in the global financial system and over-liberalization of international capital markets were also cited. The government responded by floating the currency, requesting International Monetary Fund assistance, closing some banks and postponing major capital projects.

In December 1997, Suharto for the first time did not attend an ASEAN presidents' summit, which was later revealed to be due to a minor stroke, creating speculation about his health and the immediate future of his presidency. In mid-December, as the crisis swept through Indonesia and an estimated $150 billion of capital was being withdrawn from the country, he appeared at a press conference to assure he was in charge and to urge people to trust the government and the collapsing rupiah.

Suharto's attempts to re-instil confidence, such as ordering generals to personally reassure shoppers at markets and an "I Love the Rupiah" campaign, had little effect. Another plan was the setting up of a currency board, proposed by the then special counselor Steve Hanke from Johns Hopkins University. The next day, the rupiah went up by 28% against the US dollar on both the spot and one year forward market, hearing the proposed plan. However, these developments infuriated the US government and the International Monetary Fund (IMF). Suharto was told – by both the president of the United States, Bill Clinton, and the managing director of the IMF, Michel Camdessus – that he would have to drop the currency board idea or forego $43 billion in foreign assistance.

Evidence suggested that Suharto's family and associates were being spared the most stringent requirements of the IMF reform process, and there was open conflict between economic technocrats implementing IMF plans and Suharto-related vested interests, further undermining confidence in the economy. The government's unrealistic 1998 budget and Suharto's announcement of Habibie as the next vice president both caused further currency instability. Suharto reluctantly agreed to a wider-reaching IMF package of structural reforms in January 1998 in exchange for $43 billion in liquidity (with a third letter of intent with the IMF being signed in April of that year). However, the rupiah dropped to a sixth of its pre-crisis value, and rumours and panic led to a run on stores and pushed up prices. In January 1998, the government was forced to provide emergency liquidity assistance (BLBI), issue blanket guarantees for bank deposits, and set up the Indonesian Bank Restructuring Agency to take over management of troubled banks in order to prevent the collapse of the financial system. Based on the IMF recommendations, the government increased interest rates to 70% pa in February 1998 to control high inflation caused by the higher prices of imports. However, this action restricted the availability of credit to the corporate sector.

=== Unrest, violence, and riots ===
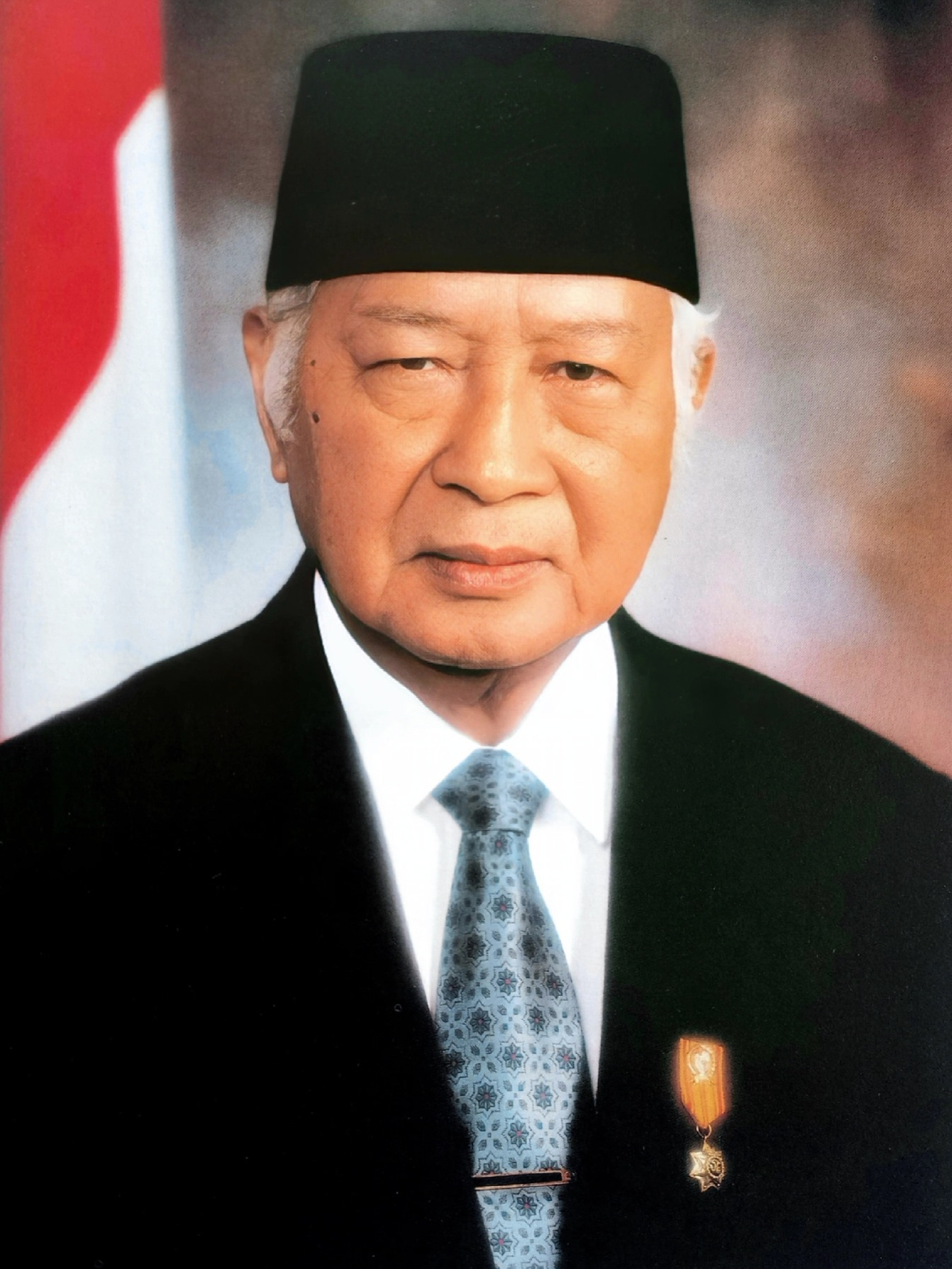
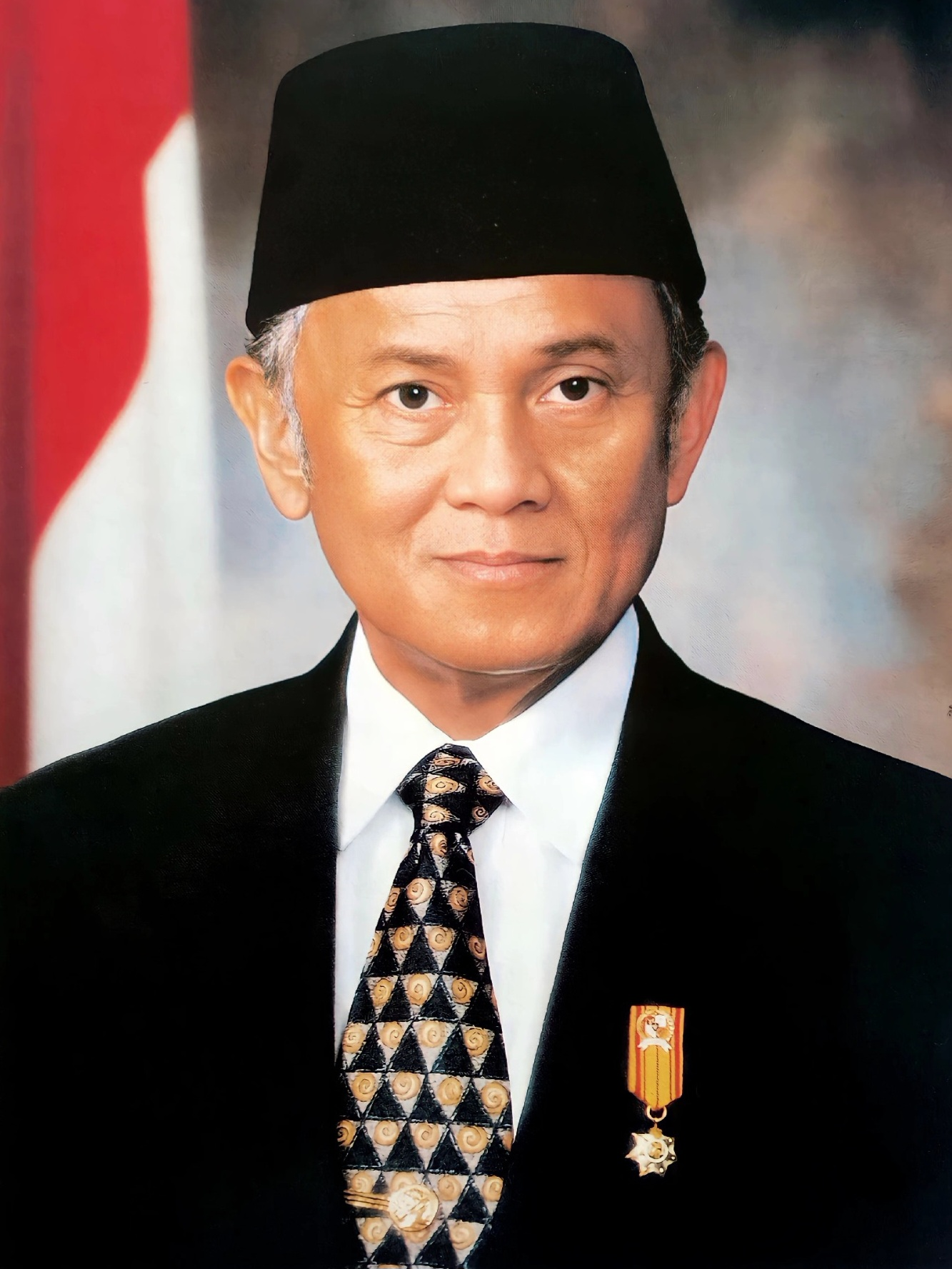
The newly elected pair of President Suharto (left), and Vice President B. J. Habibie (right), for Suharto's seventh and final term

Despite the worsening economic situation, during the 1998 General Session of the People's Consultative Assembly, Suharto was unanimously re-elected president, with vice president Try Sutrisno being replaced by minister and longtime confidant B. J. Habibie. Suharto's choice of Habibie was poorly received, causing the rupiah to continue its fall. All the while, he stacked the new Seventh Development Cabinet with several of his own family and business associates. The government's increase of fuel prices by 70% in May triggered rioting in Medan, North Sumatra. With Suharto increasingly seen as the source of the country's mounting economic and political crises, prominent political figures, including Muslim politician Amien Rais, spoke out against his presidency, and in January 1998, university students began organizing nationwide demonstrations.

A demonstration at the Bandung Institute of Technology saw 500 demonstrators, and by March, larger demonstrations had occurred at other universities. Including the University of Indonesia and Gadjah Mada University. On 9 May 1998, a police officer, Dadang Rusmana, was reported to have been killed at a demonstration at Djuanda University. These demonstrators were protesting against massive price rises for fuel and energy, and were demanding that President Suharto step down.

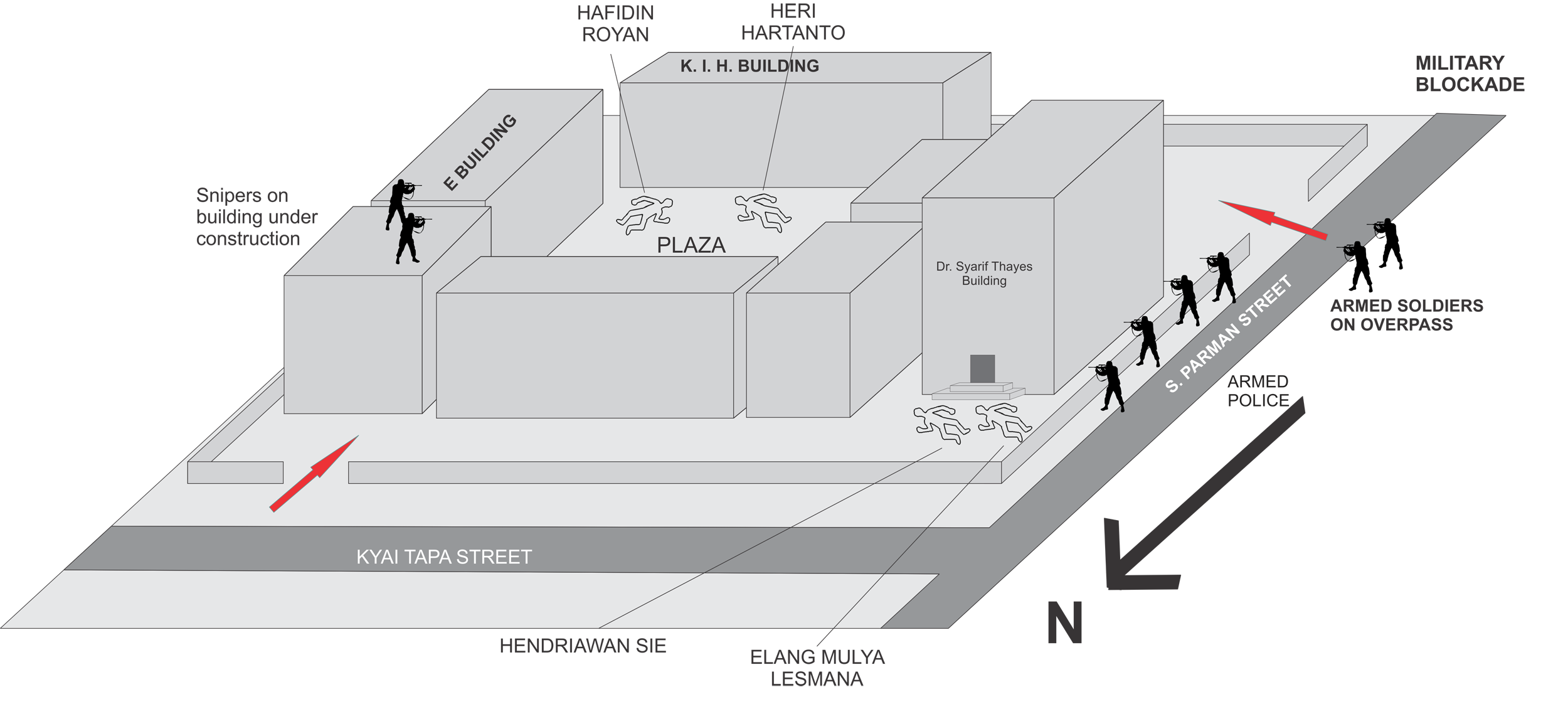
A rough outline of the situation at Trisakti University during the shootings

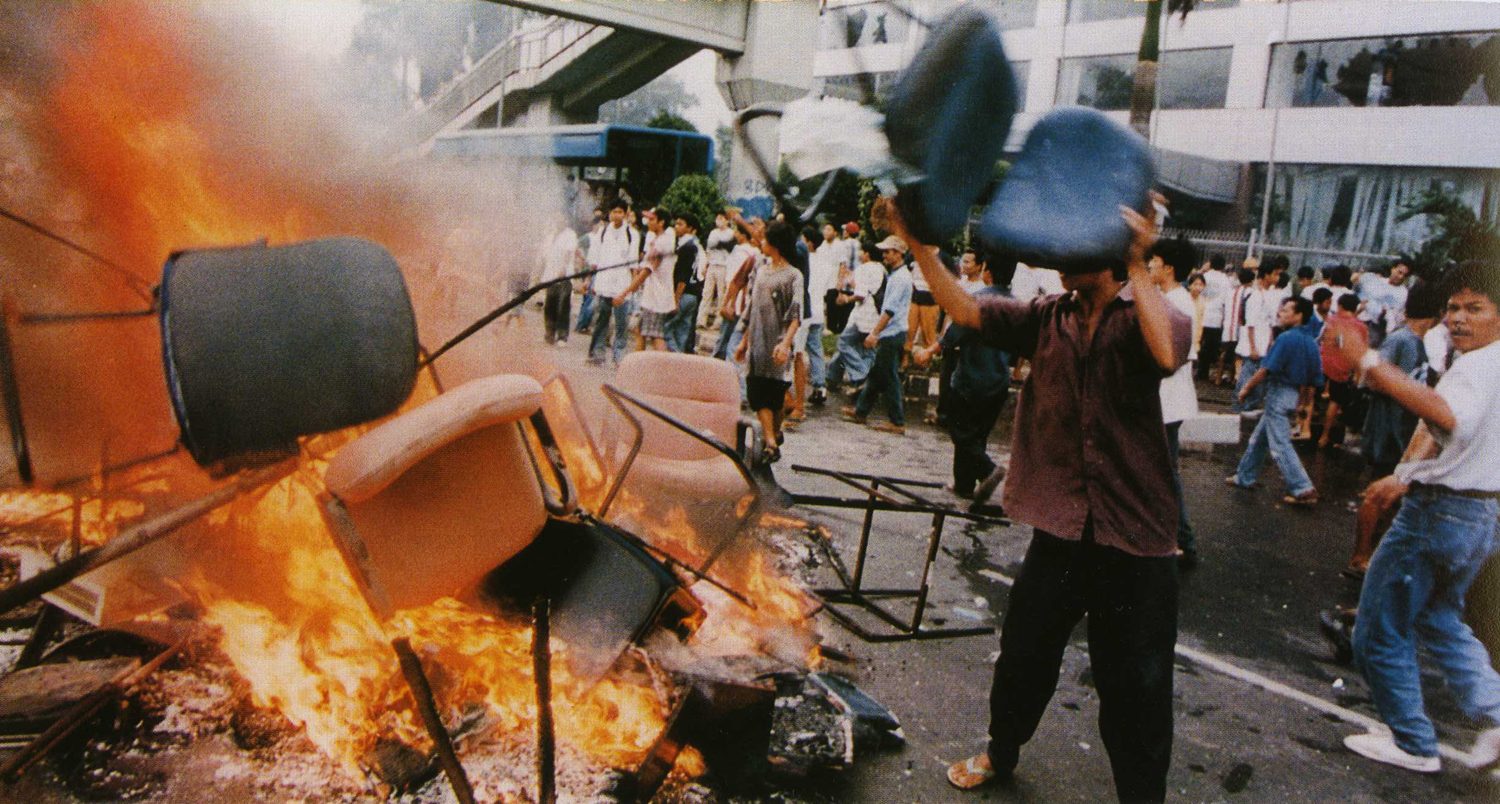
Rioters burning office furniture on the streets of Jakarta

On 9 May, Suharto left Indonesia for a Group of 15 summit in Cairo, Egypt. Meanwhile, at Jakarta's Trisakti University, university students planned to march towards the Parliamentary Complex, but security forces refused to allow them to leave the campus of the university. Students then conducted a sit-in outside the gates of the campus, there men in Mobile Brigade Corps uniforms appeared on the flyover overlooking Trisakti. They fired at the students, killing four (Elang Mulia Lesmana, Heri Hertanto, Hafidin Royan, and Hendriawan Sie), and injuring dozens more.

The student's deaths sparked mass violence and riots throughout Jakarta the following day, forcing Suharto to return on 14 May. Despite Suharto's return, riots occurred throughout the city. In Jatinegara, East Jakarta, a Matahari department store was barricaded and torched, killing around a thousand people. In Glodok, West Jakarta, mobs attacked Jakarta's Chinatown, with store owners being forced to pay local thugs to protect them from violence. Riots also occurred near the port of Tanjung Priok in Northern Jakarta, the city of Tangerang, Banten, and Kebayoran Baru in Southern Jakarta, with Chinese-owned property being the main targets. Over a thousand and as many as five thousand people died during these riots in Jakarta and other cities such as Surakarta. Many victims died in burning malls and supermarkets, but some were shot or beaten to death. The riots destroyed thirteen markets, 2,479 shop-houses, 40 malls, 1,604 shops, 45 garages, 383 private offices, nine petrol stations, eight public buses and minivans, 1,119 cars, 821 motorcycles, and 1,026 houses.

Indonesian Muslims who were considered to physically look Chinese were attacked by rioters, despite not identifying as Chinese at all and only being of distant Chinese descent. An Indonesian Muslim woman, Ruminah, mentioned she had a single Chinese grandfather (who had married a local Muslim woman), yet she and her family faced constant harassment from neighbours due to their physical appearance and assumed ethnicity. She did not identify as Chinese or speak Chinese. In the riots, her hair salon was ransacked and one of her sons died in a fire at a mall.

=== Military involvement in the riots ===
At the time, the Indonesian military had been split into two differing factions. The "red and white" nationalist faction led by Armed Forces commander General Wiranto, and the "green" Islamist faction headed by Prabowo Subianto. Prabowo, who was the commander of Kostrad (the strategic reserve, the division in which Suharto himself took power during the 1960's), was friends with Muchdi Purwopranjono, who ran the Kopassus (special forces), and another, Syafrie Samsuddin, headed the Jakarta Regional Command. During the riots, both Muchdi and Syafrie failed to order their troops to quell the riots, and a report subsequently emerged that Syafrie had actually been in radio contact with the gangs terrorizing the city. It is possible that Prabowo hoped the riots would discredit his rival Wiranto and result in Suharto appointing Prabowo to head the armed forces.

Meanwhile, other allegations surfaced of the military being actively involved with the riots. A security officer alleged that during the riots, Kopassus officers had ordered the burning down of a bank. A taxi driver reported hearing a man in a military helicopter encouraging people on the ground to carry out looting. Shop owners at a plaza claimed that before the riots, military officers tried to extract protection money. A teenager claimed he and thousands of others had been trained as protesters. A street child alleged that Kopassus officers ordered him and his friends to become rioters. There was a report of soldiers being dressed up as students and taking part in the rioting. Eyewitnesses spoke of the destruction being organized, with bands of men with short haircuts directing looters into shops, malls and banks, and of rioters being transported in military trucks. Rape victims testified that ethnic Chinese women were targeted, with assaults planned in advance.

In May 1998, thousands of Indonesian citizens were murdered and raped ...

The Joint Fact Finding Team established to inquire into the 1998 massacres found that there were serious and systematic human rights violations throughout Jakarta. The Team also found that rioters were encouraged by the absence of security forces, and that the military had played a role in the violence. The Team identified particular officials who should be held to account.

The Special Rapporteur on violence against women ... also pointed to evidence suggesting that the riots had been organised (E/CN.4/1999/68/Add.3, para. 45)

— Asian Human Rights Commission Press Release

=== Government response ===
The violence and riots, which occurred throughout the country, drew the government's attention. On 6 May, Wiranto, Prabowo's aforementioned rival, toured the affected areas, and helped restore calm to the streets. On 8 May, two days later, Prabowo himself, deployed one of his units "to support local troops and assured the public that others were ready to go into troubled areas should the need arise". However, neither efforts were able to fully contain the violence, as riots continued in Medan, fueling speculation from the public that very few orders were carried out by the deployed units.

Order was finally restored when regional military commander Yuzaini requested the help of community leaders and youth organizations to arrange for local patrols (siskamling), to patrol with security forces. However, inaction on the government's part continued, with responses to the violence being inconsistent. In the northern area of Mangga Besar, Jakarta, soldiers, allegedly stood by and allowed looters to walk away with stolen goods. While in Slipi, West Jakarta, soldiers reportedly risked their lives to protect civilians. In Surakarta (Solo), Armed Forces representative Colonel Sriyanto denied allegations of neglect, claiming that ground forces were limited and few due to units being transferred to Jakarta with only a few soldiers left to assist the police in controlling protesters at the Muhammadiyah University. For the most part, the military portrayed the violence "in terms of mobs gone mad, acting in an uncontrollable and spontaneous manner, outnumbering security forces".

=== Resignation of Suharto ===
Suharto's resignation speech
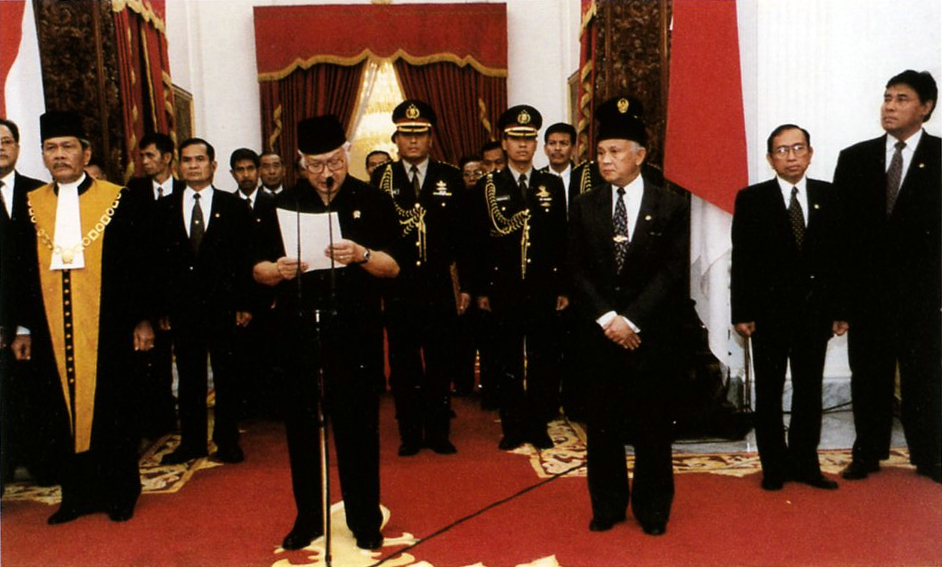
- President Suharto resigning from office. On his left, in the foreground, wearing a robe, is Chief Justice Sarwata, and on his right, in the foreground, is Vice President B. J. Habibie
- Date: May 21, 1998; 28 years ago
- Time: 9:00 am (Western Indonesia Time, UTC+07:00)
- Duration: 4 minutes
- Venue: Credential Room, Merdeka Palace
- Location: Jakarta, Indonesia
- Participants: Suharto
- Audio recording of Suharto's resignation speech

Presidential inauguration of B. J. Habibie
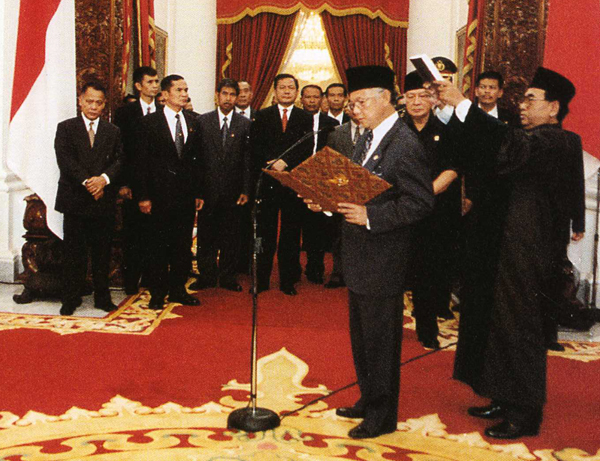
- President B. J. Habibie taking his presidential oath
- Date: 21 May 1998; 28 years ago
- Location: Merdeka Palace, Jakarta
- Participants: B. J. Habibie 3rd president of Indonesia; — Assuming office: Suharto 2nd president of Indonesia; — Leaving office

Following the riots, on 18 May, Suharto loyalists and speaker of the People's Representative Council Harmoko called for Suharto to step down from the presidency within five days, at a press conference. This was a great surprise to many, including to Suharto himself, and other loyalists of Suharto. Suharto himself saw Harmoko's request as a betrayal and loyalists referred to Harmoko as "Brutus", a reference to the Roman Senator Marcus Junius Brutus, who killed his great-uncle Julius Caesar. Meanwhile, Amien Rais, leader of the Islamic organisation Muhammadiyah, declared he would organize a demonstration of a million supporters to call for Suharto's resignation. This was planned for 20 May, celebrated as Indonesia's National Awakening. On the evening of 18 May, influential Muslim intellectual Nurcholish Madjid, who had held various meetings with generals and civilians, met with Suharto. The meeting ended with Suharto telling Nurcholish of his intention to resign "as soon as possible" following a meeting with Muslim leaders. This two-hour meeting took place on the morning of 19 May. Afterwards, Suharto announced to the nation that he would reshuffle the cabinet and set up a reform committee to plan new elections.

Following a warning from a Prabowo ally of possible bloodshed, Amien Rais called off the demonstration. On 20 May, there was a "massive show of force" from the military, with soldiers and armored vehicles on the streets of Jakarta. Prabowo wanted a robust response to the demonstrators, but Wiranto realized that the Suharto era was coming to an end and was more receptive to the students' demands. According to sources of The Jakarta Post, Wiranto visited Suharto at home and asked the president to resign. On the same day, some of Suharto's allies refused to serve in a new cabinet. Facing a threat of impeachment from Harmoko, and having received a letter from 14 cabinet members rejecting the formation of a new cabinet, Suharto decided to resign. At 9 a.m. on 21 May, Suharto made a short speech of resignation. He was immediately replaced by Vice President B. J. Habibie. Allegedly, late on the evening of 21 May, Prabowo arrived at the presidential palace and demanded that he be made head of the army, and that Wiranto be replaced as chief of the armed forces. Reportedly, Habibie escaped from the palace. The following day, Prabowo was sacked as head of Kostrad. Wiranto remained as chief of the armed forces, and his troops began removing the students from the parliament building.

==== Transcript ====
Indonesian
Sejak beberapa waktu terakhir, saya mengikuti dengan cermat perkembangan situasi nasional kita, terutama aspirasi rakyat untuk mengadakan reformasi di segala bidang kehidupan berbangsa dan bernegara. Atas dasar pemahaman saya yang mendalam terhadap aspirasi tersebut dan terdorong oleh keyakinan bahwa reformasi perlu dilaksanakan secara tertib, damai, dan konstitusional.

English
Since the last few years, I have been following closely the developments of our national situation, especially the aspirations of the people to carry out reforms in all areas of the life of the nation and state. On the basis of my deep understanding of these aspirations and driven by the belief that reforms need to be carried out in an orderly, peaceful and constitutional manner.

Demi terpeliharanya persatuan dan kesatuan bangsa serta kelangsungan pembangunan nasional, saya telah menyatakan rencana pembentukan Komite Reformasi dan mengubah susunan Kabinet Pembangunan VII. Namun demikian, kenyataan hingga hari ini menunjukkan Komite Reformasi tersebut tidak dapat terwujud karena tidak adanya tanggapan yang memadai terhadap rencana pembentukan komite tersebut.

For the sake of maintaining the unity and integrity of the nation as well as the continuity of national development, I have stated the plan to form the Reform Committee and amend the composition of the Development VII Cabinet. However, the reality to this day shows that the Reform Committee could not be realized because there was no adequate response to the plan to form the committee.

Dalam keinginan untuk melaksanakan reformasi dengan cara sebaik-baiknya tadi, saya menilai bahwa dengan tidak dapat diwujudkannya Komite Reformasi, maka perubahan susunan Kabinet Pembangunan VII menjadi tidak diperlukan lagi. Dengan memperhatikan keadaan di atas, saya berpendapat sangat sulit bagi saya untuk dapat menjalankan tugas pemerintahan negara dan pembangunan dengan baik. Oleh karena itu, dengan memperhatikan ketentuan Pasal 8 UUD 1945 dan secara sungguh-sungguh memperhatikan pandangan pimpinan DPR dan pimpinan fraksi-fraksi yang ada di dalamnya, saya memutuskan untuk menyatakan berhenti dari jabatan saya sebagai Presiden RI terhitung sejak saya bacakan pernyataan ini pada hari Kamis, 21 Mei 1998.

In the desire to carry out reforms in the best possible way, I consider that if the Reform Committee cannot be established, a change in the composition of the Development VII Cabinet is no longer necessary. Taking into account the situation above, I think it is very difficult for me to be able to carry out the duties of state government and development properly. Therefore, taking into account the provisions of Article 8 of the 1945 Constitution and seriously paying attention to the views of the leadership of the House of Representatives (DPR) and the parliamentary group leaders in it, I have decided to declare my resignation from my position as President of the Republic of Indonesia as of the time I read this statement on Thursday, 21 May 1998.

== Post-Suharto era ==
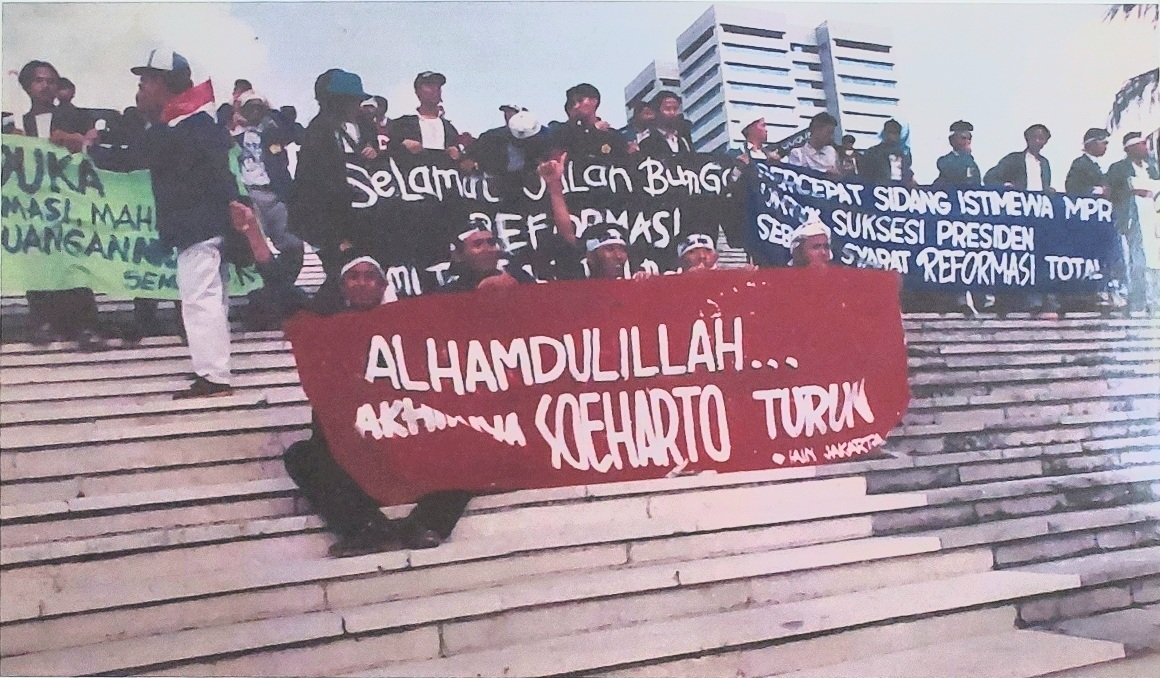
Students celebrating on the steps of the MPR Building, minutes after realizing that Suharto had resigned.

Not so often reported was the silent departure of families and wealth from the country. The emigrants were not exclusively of Chinese descent, but also included wealthy natives (pribumi) and Suharto's cronies. The immediate destination was Singapore, where some stayed permanently while others moved on to Australia, the US and Canada. Many of these families returned when the political situation stabilised a few years later.

Since the fall of the New Order, there has been a variety of state-sponsored initiatives to address the widespread abuses of human rights since the fall of Suharto. A report issued by the International Center for Transitional Justice and the Indonesian Commission for Disappeared Persons and Victims of Violence (KontraS) concluded that, that "senior government officials consistently failed to achieve truth, accountability, institutional reform and reparations for the most severe crimes.
