= May 1998 Indonesia riots =

- Part of the fall of Suharto, 1997 Asian financial crisis and anti-Chinese sentiment in Indonesia
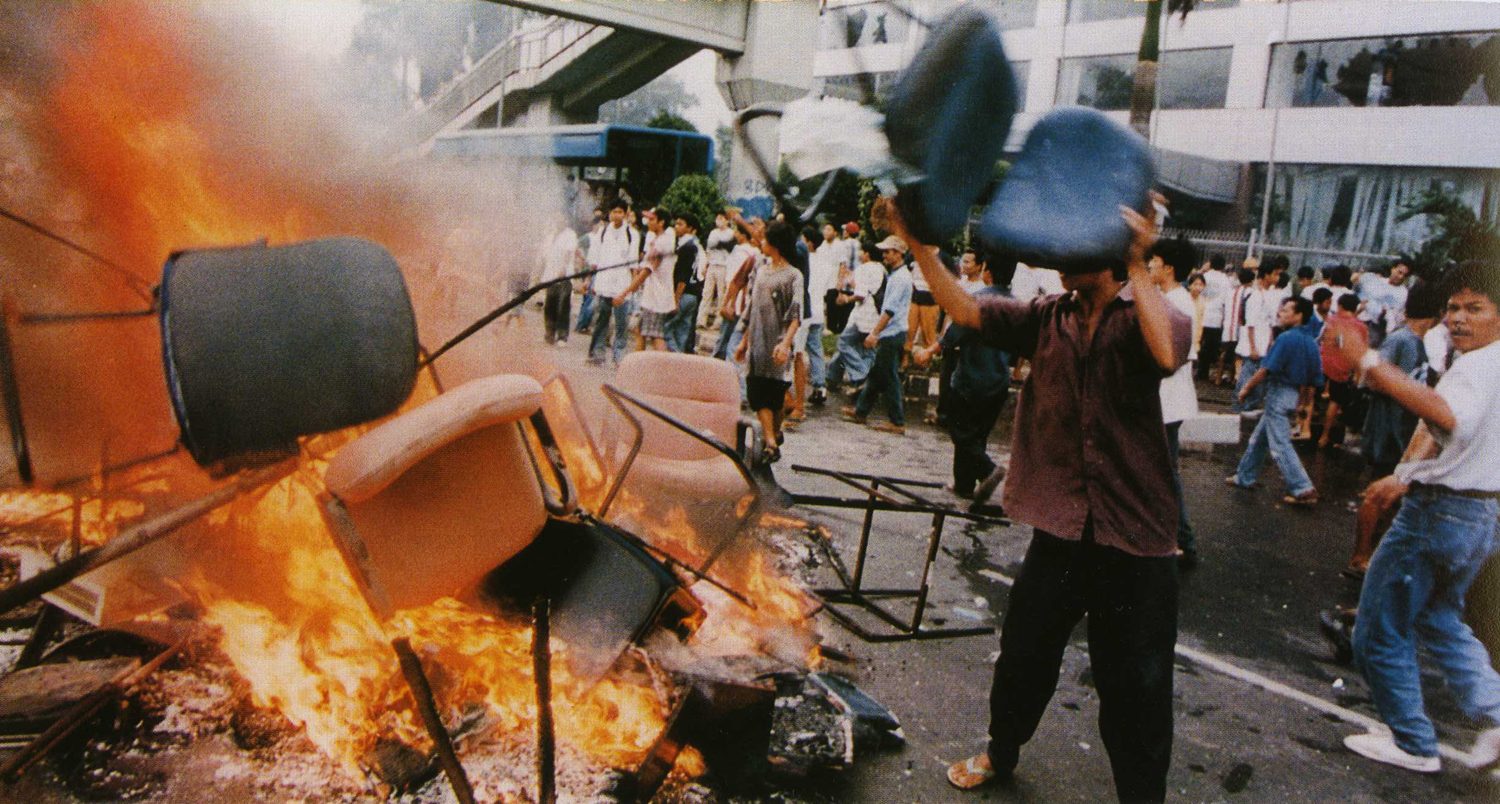
- Rioters burning office furniture on the streets of Jakarta on 14 May 1998
- Date: 4–8 and 12–15 May 1998
- Location: Major riots occurred in Medan, Jakarta, Surakarta, Palembang, and Surabaya with a number of isolated incidents elsewhere
- Caused by: Long-term discrimination against Chinese-Indonesians; Discontent over the New Order government; Alleged vote-rigging in the 1997 legislative election; Economic collapse as a result of the Asian financial crisis; Authoritarianism; Trisakti shootings
- Methods: Riot, civil disobedience, looting, arson, rape, vandalism
- Result: Resignation of President Suharto and the creation of a new Development Reform Cabinet under B. J. Habibie; 2,244 people killed, 168 rape cases, over 4,000 shops and markets destroyed, thousands of homes and vehicles set on fire; Timor-Leste independence; Beginning of the Reformation era

Parties
Government of Indonesia; Indonesian National Armed Forces; Indonesian Army; Indonesian Navy; Indonesian Marine Corps; Indonesian National Police; Mobile Brigade Corps; State Intelligence Agency	Native Indonesian civilians consisting of Megawati Sukarnoputri supporters, anti-government protesters and Arab Indonesian protesters	Chinese Indonesian civilians including some anti-Megawati and anti-Suharto supporters

Map of Indonesia showing locations of the May 1998 riots

The May 1998 Indonesia riots (Indonesian: Kerusuhan Mei 1998), also known colloquially as the 1998 tragedy (Tragedi 1998) or simply the 98 event (Peristiwa 98), were incidents of riots and civil unrest in Indonesia, many of which targeted the country's ethnic Chinese population. The events were mainly in the cities of Jakarta, Medan, Surakarta, Palembang, and Surabaya with smaller incidents in other parts of Indonesia.

Under the President Suharto regime, there had been widespread and systematic discrimination against ethnic Chinese in Indonesia. The riots were triggered by corruption and economic problems, including food shortages and mass unemployment. It eventually led to the resignation of President Suharto and the fall of the New Order government, which had been in power for 32 years and was heavily backed by Western powers such as the United States. The main targets of the violence were ethnic Chinese Indonesians, but most of the casualties were caused by a massive fire and occurred among looters.

It was estimated that more than 1,000 people died in the riots. At least 168 cases of rape were reported, and material damage was valued at more than Rp3.1 trillion (US$260 million). As of 2010, legal proceedings regarding the riots were stalled and not completed.

== Background ==
=== 1997 legislative election ===
On 27 July 1996, soldiers, police, and civilians attacked the headquarters of the Indonesian Democratic Party (Partai Demokrasi Indonesia, PDI) in Central Jakarta, which was occupied by supporters of party leader Megawati Sukarnoputri, daughter of former President Sukarno. Megawati had been selected as party leader in general congress in December 1993. Her selection, however, was seen as a threat by the New Order government, which suppressed free speech during its 32 years in power. Popular support of Megawati and the PDI was growing leading up to the 1997 legislative election and threatened the dominance of the ruling Golkar party. The government declared Megawati's appointment invalid and organised a new congress in June 1996, during which a new party leader was selected. The attackers said they were acting on behalf of the rightful party leadership. The incident evolved into two days of rioting in Jakarta that the government blamed on the illegal People's Democratic Party (Partai Rakyat Demokratik, PRD). Violence continued up to the election on 29 May 1997, which was won by Golkar with 74% of the votes. The divided PDI received only 3% of the votes, while the mostly Muslim United Development Party (Partai Persatuan Pembangunan, PPP) received 22%.

The election was marred by widespread cases of vote-rigging, causing public outcry especially among supporters of the PPP, which had called on the government to follow a democratic process lest the results be rejected by the public. At this time, Indonesia was experiencing an economic boom with its gross domestic product growing at a rate of 8% in 1996, led by the manufacturing sector. Five months after the election, however, it was caught in the Asian Financial Crisis which began when the Thai baht collapsed in July. The rupiah dropped from Rp2,450 to Rp4,000 to the US dollar between July and October, and economic growth slowed to 1.4% in the fourth quarter. Unable to stabilise the economy, the government sought assistance from the International Monetary Fund. The rupiah declined further to one-sixth of its original value by January 1998. With rising unemployment and inflated food prices, the public lost confidence in the government's ability to turn the economy around. Violence spread throughout the island of Java, but the government exercised its power in February and imposed a 25-day ban on street protests. Law enforcement officials were given the authority to imprison anyone found participating in political activities in violation of the ban.

Suharto was elected by the People's Consultative Assembly (Majelis Permusyawaratan Rakyat, MPR) to a seventh consecutive five-year term as president in March. Despite calls for economic and political reforms, his controversial Seventh Development Cabinet included his family members and cronies, including protégé B. J. Habibie as vice-president. Student demonstrations in campuses grew in intensity following these events.

== Riots ==
=== Medan (4–8 May) ===
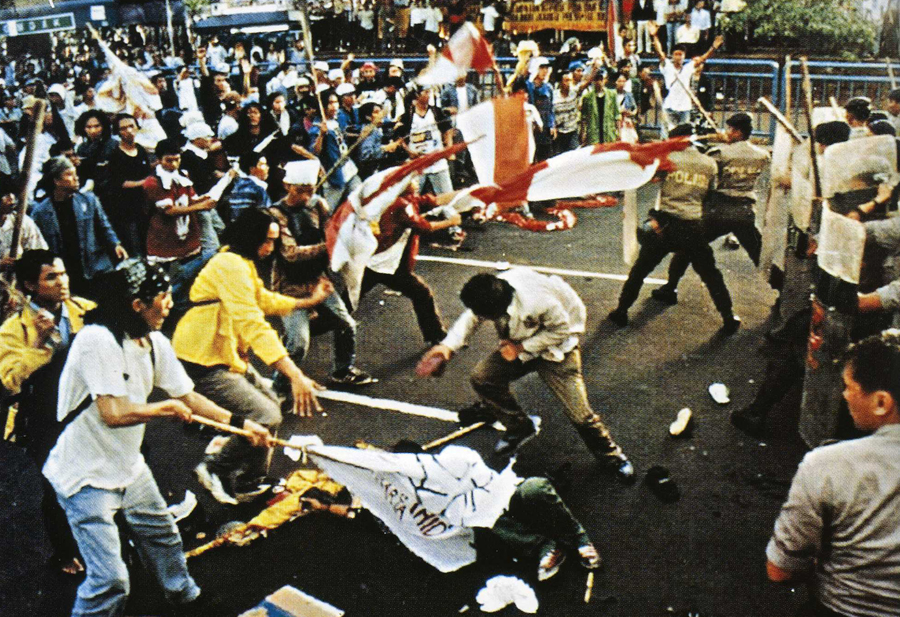
Trisakti University students and police forces clash in May 1998

By the beginning of May, students had been demonstrating on campuses throughout Medan for nearly two months. The growing number of demonstrators was coupled with increasing calls from the public for overall reforms. On 27 April, the death of a student in a vehicle accident was blamed on security officials who had fired tear gas on the campus. Over the next few days, the clashes between students and security forces grew. On 2 May, one of Timor's car showrooms was attacked due to its development being spearheaded by the President's son, Tommy Suharto.

When the government announced on 4 May that it would increase the price of gasoline by 70% and triple the price of electricity, campus groups reacted. More than 500 students gathered at the State Institute of Teacher Training and Education of Medan (IKIP Negeri Medan). Security forces barricaded the campus to prevent students from leaving and allegedly threw Molotov bombs at demonstrators through the day. Although the students had dispersed by late afternoon, replacement forces were brought in to keep them on campus through the night. When they were allowed to return home hours later, police reportedly stopped a group of students and assaulted them. Word of this attack spread through several witnesses, and a large group later attacked and destroyed a traffic police post. As the outnumbered police fled, protesters began attacking shopping malls and another police post. Thousands poured into the streets and burned cars and shops through the late night.

On the morning of 5 May, a crowd gathered at a police station where it was reported that more than 50 people suspected of involvement in the previous night's attack were detained. When more officers arrived to confront the group, the station was attacked. The crowd moved toward the nearby market of Tembung as they burned cars and attacked houses. Shops owned by Chinese Indonesians were looted, while they reportedly left those marked with the words "milik pribumi" (owned by the indigenous pribumi) in graffiti alone. When the Mobile Brigade arrived in the afternoon, the crowd was dispersed with tear gas. As businesses in Medan closed on the following day, thousands of people attacked markets throughout the city and its surrounding districts. Police and anti-riot soldiers fired rubber bullets at the crowd to disperse them but were unsuccessful. When the violence ended two days later, six people had died (two by gunshot) and one hundred were injured (nine with gunshot wounds). Police detained 51 people for questioning, and the damage was estimated in the hundreds of billions of rupiah. Many looted shophouses were mainly in nearby indigenous and outskirt areas like Jalan Aksara, Tembung, Pasar Baru, Brayan and Pancing. Meanwhile, in Chinese-majority areas such as Medan Kota and Maimun districts (Jalan Asia, Kesawan, Pandu, Cirebon, Wahidin, Sutrisno, Sumatra), Cemara, Sunggal, Setiabudi and several roads nearby were mostly safe from the mobs due to strict guarding by local residents.

Major locations of the 1998 Jakarta riots (12–15 May)
Trisakti shootings, 12 May; 13 May; 14 May;
Yogya Plaza fire, 14 May; 15 May

=== Jakarta (12–14 May) ===
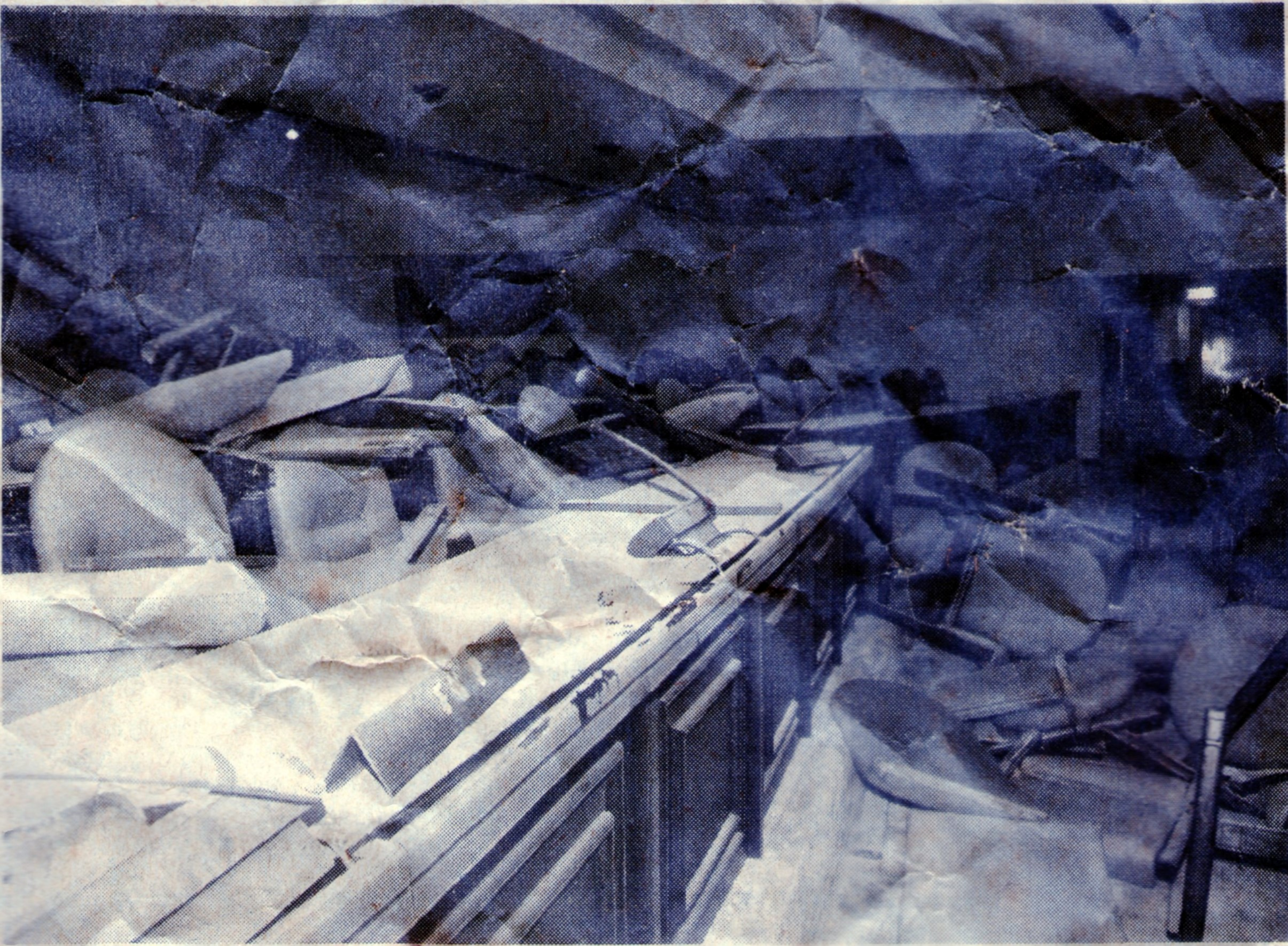
Destroyed DPR/MPR courtroom, after being occupied by students

On 9 May, one day after the violence in Medan ended, President Suharto left the country for a Group of 15 summit in Cairo, Egypt. Prior to his departure, he called on the public to end the protests. To the Suara Pembaruan daily newspaper, he said, "I judge that if we continue like this there will be no progress." He later returned to Indonesia earlier than scheduled on 14 May, when the worst violence occurred in Jakarta. The campus of Trisakti University in Grogol, West Jakarta, became the site of a gathering of 10,000 students on 12 May. They had planned on marching south toward the Parliament building, but security forces refused to allow them to leave the campus. The university students conducted a sit-in outside the campus gates, which the police fired shots at and demonstrators responded by throwing rocks at police. In the ensuing chaos, four students were killed.

Catalysed by the student deaths, mass violence occurred throughout Jakarta the following day. The Matahari department store in the eastern district of Jatinegara and Yogya Plaza in Klender were barricaded and deliberately torched. It was estimated that at least a thousand people died inside the buildings during the fires. Mobs also attacked Glodok in the northwestern part of the city, where the commercial area of Jakarta's Chinatown was severely damaged. Some store owners reportedly paid local thugs to protect them from the violence because security forces were mostly absent. Riots also occurred near the port of Tanjung Priok in the north, the city of Tangerang to the west, and Kebayoran Baru in the south. Properties owned by Chinese Indonesians were the most common targets.

=== Surakarta (14–15 May) ===
Student protests in Surakarta (also called Solo) began as early as March at the Muhammadiyah University of Surakarta (UMS) and the Sebelas Maret (11 March) University (UNS) and grew over the next two months, prompting the police to station officers outside both campuses to prevent them from entering the streets. On 8 May, later known as "Bloody Friday", a clash between UNS students and police forces resulted in hundreds of wounded students. There was also evidence of gunfire as police launched tear gas canisters and fired rubber bullets.

UMS students clashed with security forces on 14 May during a protest of the Trisakti shootings in Jakarta. A report of the incident claimed that the violence was provoked by students throwing objects at police from campus grounds. Security forces were unable to disperse the group, and the angered mob of 1,000 moved eastward into the city. A showroom of Timor cars was attacked, much like the violence in Medan earlier in the month. Kostrad (Army Strategic Reserve) forces arrived as the crowd attacked banks and public buildings in the city centre and prevented them from reaching the city hall. From there, they broke up into smaller groups and attacked the surrounding districts of Surakarta. More people poured into the streets when tires were lit on fire at intersections. Because 11 companies of the Brimob, crowd control forces, and Kostrad soldiers had remained on the UMS campus, downtown Surakarta was left unprotected. Additionally, members of the Kopassus (special forces) had left the city earlier in the day. A group of 15 "provocateurs" was said to have directed crowds using walkie-talkies and incited some of the violence using crowbars to open buildings and throwing Molotov bombs into them.

Because electricity was cut throughout the city that evening, residents were not able to receive television and radio coverage of the events. Instead, they relied on the local newspaper Solopos for accounts of the previous day on 15 May. As the attacks continued to a second day, 10,000 student protesters organised a separate peaceful protest and marched from the UNS campus to the city hall, explaining that they were not connected to the mob violence.

=== Other cities ===
On 14 May 1998, in Sidotopo, Surabaya, rioters targeted Chinese-owned stores and homes, burning their properties. After the riots, ten thousand Madurese patrolled the streets from further attempted riots, armed with celurit. The Joint Fact Finding Team (Tim Gabungan Pencari Fakta, TGPF) found two cases of rape and four cases of sexual assault.

On 14 May 1998, at least ten offices, banks, and showrooms in Padang, West Sumatra, had rocks thrown at them by student rioters on the way to the Provincial People's Representative Council (DPRD) office of West Sumatra.

On the same day, in Palembang, South Sumatra, ten shops were burned, more than a dozen cars were burned by rioters, and dozens of people were injured by rocks thrown by students marching to the DPRD office of South Sumatra. Thousands of police and soldiers were put on guard at various points in the city. The non-governmental Volunteer Team for Humanity (Indonesian: Tim Relawan untuk Kemanusiaan, or TRUK) reported that cases of sexual assault also took place.

On 15 May 1998, at roughly 14:20 WIB, thousands of rioters from Surakarta arrived in Boyolali, burning factories, cars and homes, as well as looting stores near the Boyolali market. Banks were closed due to threats to burn Bank Central Asia branch in Salatiga, rioters blocked the road from Semarang to Surakarta.

Some Pribumi Indonesians assisted Chinese Indonesians who were their "friends and neighbours" and "targets of the violence"; they protected their friends from "attacks and looting". While some neighbours and bystanders did not assist others, some neighbours helped each other by:

- building barricades together
- taking turns patrolling
- taking care of affected individuals

=== Death toll ===
Yogya Klender Mall in East Jakarta saw 400 looters burnt to death. The total death toll was around 1,188 according to one report, and at least 85 women were reported raped.

The violence was directed at destroying property owned by Chinese Indonesians and Chinese temples.

The majority of anti-Chinese violence in previous riots also involved only looting Chinese shops and property without killing the owners themselves. Anti-Chinese riots took the form of looting goods, burning houses, and killing on the spot those identified as Chinese. Most Indonesians believed that the Chinese have an infinite supply of products and thought that the shops would open again in the future despite the looting.

Indonesian Muslims who physically looked Chinese were attacked by rioters, despite them not identifying as Chinese at all and only having a distant Chinese ancestor. An Indonesian Muslim woman who had five sons, Ruminah, mentioned she had just one Chinese grandfather who married a local Muslim woman and she did not identify as Chinese at all or speak Chinese but she and her family were constantly harassed and hated by their neighbours just for their Chinese physical looks and her hair salon was ransacked and one of her sons died in a fire at the mall during the riots.

=== Allegations of false pictures ===
On 19 August, a group called the Reformasi Presidium Council of Youth and Students of Surabaya issued a statement claiming that the rape photographs were 'bohong belaka' (flat out lies) and part of a 'rekayasa' (political engineering) with the goal of inciting hatred against Indonesia. The following day, this story was picked up by Asia Wall Street Journal, and the story broke internationally. The story claims that the sources of some of these photographs were from a gory photo exhibit and a pornographic website, including one named "Sexy Asian Schoolgirls". This story made its way into an Indonesian national newspaper, Republika, a few days later and began to be widely disseminated in other local newspapers as well.

Scholars have since commented on the impact of these allegations. Following sharing of these photographs online, an intense debate broke out in online Chinese communities. Australian researcher Elaine Tay believes such discussions "do not give the sense that these participants are conscious of the issue of authenticity". As such, she argues that these commentators or "diasporic activists", have "unwittingly complicated the investigation into this issue".

American author Karen Strassler is concerned with the effect of these allegations on the Indonesian public discourse. She argues that although many Indonesians did not see the photos, the "discussion of them in the press served those who would deny the rapes particularly well." The campaign to question the veracity and authenticity of the photographs creates "extraordinary power to discredit the effort to gain recognition for the rape victims."

== Response ==
=== Government response ===
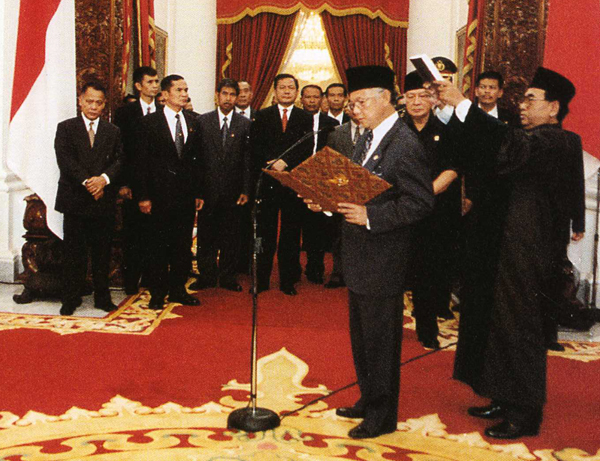
B. J. Habibie takes the presidential oath of office following Suharto's resignation, one week after the violence. He later appointed a fact-finding team to investigate the May riots.

Suharto's resignation
President Suharto announcing his resignation as president, 21 May 1998.

Violence in Medan drew the attention of national security officers. General Wiranto, Commander of the Armed Forces (Panglima Angkatan Bersenjata, Pangab, or Panglima ABRI), toured the affected areas on 6 May and committed his forces to help restore calm to the city. Two days later, Lieutenant General Prabowo Subianto of the Kostrad (Army Strategic Reserve) deployed one of his units "to support local troops and assured the public that others were ready to go into troubled areas should the need arise". Neither effort, however, was able to contain the violence as the riots continued in Medan for another three days following Wiranto's visit, leading the public to believe that few orders were carried out by the deployed units. Order was finally restored when regional military commander Yuzaini requested the help of community leaders and youth organisations to arrange for local patrols (siskamling) with security forces. Security inaction continued as violence escalated in Jakarta, and the military leadership in charge of security in the capital city—Wiranto, Prabowo, and General Susilo Bambang Yudhoyono—were absent. Military and police response in the capital was inconsistent. Soldiers in the northern area of Mangga Besar allegedly stood by and allowed looters to walk away with stolen goods. In Slipi to the west, soldiers reportedly risked their lives to protect civilians.

In Surakarta, Armed Forces representative Colonel Sriyanto denied allegations of neglect by the military. He claimed that ground forces were limited because some units were en route to Jakarta while the few left behind were assisting police in controlling protesters at the Muhammadiyah University. For the most part, the military portrayed the violence "in terms of mobs gone mad, acting in an uncontrollable and spontaneous manner, outnumbering security forces". Susuhunan Pakubuwono XII, the traditional monarch of Surakarta, condemned the violence as behaviour "not in line with the cultural values held by wong Solo (Solonese)". He also made a rare appearance on 19 May to demonstrate solidarity by the elites with victims of the violence. In a meeting with 5,000 students at his palace complex, he pledged a symbolic amount of Rp1,111,111 to support the students' calls for reform.

As it was evident that Suharto had lost control of his senior military leaders, he resigned one week after the violence on 21 May. Two months later, on 23 July, his successor B. J. Habibie appointed the TGPF to conduct an official investigation of the May riots. During the investigation, the team had difficulty finding witnesses who were willing to testify about the violence, and the team was only given three months to investigate riots in six cities. Data collected by the team mainly came from non-governmental organisations and the state-sponsored Communication Forum for National Unity (Badan Komunikasi Penghayatan Kesatuan Bangsa, Bakom PKB), which had compiled numerous police reports on the incidents. The full report totalling hundreds of pages was never distributed to the public and was only available to members of the team, relevant government ministers, and a few researchers. The media received a 20-page summary in both Indonesian and English, which was then distributed widely on the Internet.

To this day, government officials deny the occurrence of sexual violence, citing a lack of police reports despite overwhelming evidence from local human rights groups.

=== Public reaction ===
Chinese Indonesians in Medan became victims of the local preman (gangsters) who threatened the community with violence. Prior to the rioting, the Chinese commonly used extra-legal methods to ensure their protection and security. Consequently, groups who extorted money from the Chinese—sometimes agents of government—saw them as nothing but "cash cows". During the violence, however, intimidation was often followed by the looting of Chinese-owned stores and businesses. Most people believed that non-Chinese Indonesians were "safe", therefore many put up signs in the front of their businesses that said "Muslim Pribumi owned". Chinese Indonesians were angered and felt betrayed by the violence, and many fled the area for Malaysia, Singapore, Taiwan, Netherlands, Australia, United States, or other locations near Indonesia. Those who remained checked into indigenous-owned hotels or armed themselves to form a community defence group. However, local community members distinguished this incident from previous anti-Chinese violence because threats against the Chinese were "a part of the socioeconomic and political structure of the city". They believed that the riots were incited by either student demonstrations or thugs who sought to discredit the reform movement.

Although the Special Rapporteur was repeatedly told that the Chinese were rich and wealthy, many of the victims she met who had been raped during the May riots appeared to be from lower-middle-class backgrounds. Some were single women living alone, striving to make ends meet. It appeared that the victims were in fact poor.

— Radhika Coomaraswamy, United Nations Special Rapporteur on Violence Against Women

Stories of sexual violence with perpetrators shouting anti-Chinese slogans and other verbal abuses during the Jakarta riots shocked Indonesians. As the incidents were represented as state-sponsored violence, national and international groups became more vocal in calling for reform and the government to step down. Muhammadiyah leader Amien Rais denounced the violence in Surakarta, which he saw as more destructive than the riots on Jakarta. The Islamic organisation manages the UMS campus, where student clashes with police on 14 May prompted the ensuing violence. His statement that the Surakarta incident was orchestrated by a dalang (puppeteer) rather than unorganised masses became a national headline. Unlike in Jakarta, local citizens in Surakarta did not view the violence in their city as anti-Chinese. This image was further cultivated by the insistence of influential Chinese Indonesians that the causes were "multifaceted". Most Chinese who fled during the violence returned after it had subsided, unlike those in Medan and Jakarta.

=== International reaction ===
When the Jakarta riots began, the United States government ordered the evacuation of "dependents and non-essential personnel" of the consulate. The Department of State also recommended US citizens to leave the country using commercial flights or evacuation flights organised by US forces. The USS Belleau Wood and its "Flying Tigers" Marine Helicopter Squadron were stationed in the region as part of a contingency evacuation plan for US citizens and embassy personnel, known as Operation Bevel Incline. In the Department of State's "Indonesia Country Report on Human Rights Practices for 1998", the US accused Suharto's government of committing "serious human rights abuses". Between the 1997 election and the riots, students and human rights activists were kidnapped and tortured while in the custody of security forces. The report also mentioned that police stoned and fired at foreign journalists covering a clash between students and security forces on 6 May.

Previously, Chinese communities were more concerned with commercial and economic matters. The ethnic Chinese in Indonesia had been pummeled by rioting the past decades—but they had always absorbed the punishment meekly to preserve their commercial interests. This time around, a landmark shift occurred with modern communications technology becoming the unifying force.

— Felix Soh, The Straits Times

As news of attacks on Chinese Indonesians during the violence reached the international ethnic Chinese community, the riots were labelled as "anti-Chinese" in nature. In a letter to President Habibie, leader of the Hong Kong Democratic Party Martin Lee wrote, "The severity of these two days of mayhem evoked comparisons to the Nazi regime's attacks against Jews." Ethnic Chinese organised protests through the website Global Huaren, founded by Malaysian Chinese emigrant Joe Tan in New Zealand. Tan founded the website in response to "seeming indifference" around the world and spread news of the violence to professionals and colleagues. Members then coordinated rallies at Indonesian embassies and consulates in major Pacific Rim cities. Solidarity from the international community brought about a renewed awareness of ethnic and national identity—Indonesian and Chinese—among Chinese Indonesians "because for so long the one had been sacrificed for the other".

China's cautious response to the issue caused an uproar among human rights groups. Following protests at the Indonesian embassy in Beijing in August, Foreign Minister Tang Jiaxuan made a direct appeal to the Indonesian government to ensure the protection of Chinese Indonesian communities. During a visit to Jakarta in November, Chinese Communist Party General Secretary Jiang Zemin said that "Chinese Indonesians will not only serve ... the long term stability of Indonesia, but also ... the smooth development of the relationship of friendly cooperation with neighboring countries." China claims they have also urged airlines to operate three more flights out of Indonesia, which transported some 200 Chinese people away from Jakarta. The riots became known in China as "Black May" (黑色的五月), named after a VCD documentary of the events released by the China Radio and Television Publishing House in October. Compared to China's approach, Taiwan took on a more active role in demanding the trial of those involved in the violence and protection for victims. It threatened to withdraw investments from the country, estimated at US$13 billion in 1998, and block the entry of Indonesian workers, whose population in Taiwan had reached 15,000. Taiwan justified the threats "based on the principles of protecting overseas Chinese and protecting human rights". On 9 August, Minister of Investment Hamzah Haz flew to Taiwan and apologised for the violence while promoting Indonesia as an investment destination. At the same time, a Taiwanese delegation met with Wiranto, who was then the Defence Minister under Habibie, as well as several other government ministers.

== Aftermath and legacy ==
For more than a week after the riots in Jakarta, locals feared for their safety and stayed home. Most banks, businesses, and public buildings remained closed in major cities throughout the country. Some government offices reopened for the commemoration of National Awakening Day on 20 May. Despite fears that the riots could worsen, only three minor incidents occurred in smaller cities. Data compiled by the fact-finding team on the human toll of the violence in the capital was conflicting. TRUK reported 1,109 deaths from fire, 27 gunshot deaths, 91 wounded, and an additional 31 missing. Police reports counted 463 dead and 69 wounded, while the city government only reported 288 dead and 101 wounded. Property damage was estimated at Rp2.5 trillion (US$238 million), with the city government reporting 5,723 buildings and 1,948 vehicles destroyed, while police reports counted 3,862 buildings and 2,693 vehicles. Damage in Surakarta was estimated at Rp457 billion (US$46 million), with Chinese Indonesians suffering most of the material losses.

Members of TGPF appointed by Habibie believed their mandate for seeking the truth behind the violence included drawing conclusions and making recommendations. Although they were given access to members of the military elite, their findings came into conflict with the military and the government. Unwilling to let go of "the power to be gained by having a monopoly over ... 'representations' of the violence", government officials and the military elite inside and outside Soeharto's circle rejected or ignored the team's findings. Sections of the report were also challenged by the national media. The People's Representative Council (Dewan Perwakilan Rakyat, DPR) eventually declared the riots "ordinary crimes" during the Megawati administration (2001–2004). The collapse of Soeharto's government also led to the intensification of separatist movements in the outlying provinces of Aceh, Papua, and East Timor. Ethnic and religious conflicts also flared in Maluku and Central Sulawesi as law and order deteriorated. In a January 1999 poll by the daily newspaper The Jakarta Post, 77% of respondents rated public safety levels as bad or very bad. Economic conditions continued to fluctuate in the first few months of Habibie's presidency, and the National Police reported that crime increased by 10% during 1998.

=== Alleged military involvement ===
Based on reports of military inaction during the riots, the TGPF made an unprecedented allegation against the military elite. The team concluded that "the Armed Forces had failed to anticipate the riot, that there was a lack of adequate communications between those in command and those on the ground, and that, as a consequence, the forces had responded tardily in most cases and sometimes not at all". Soldiers allegedly allowed rioting to continue in some areas, while others were hesitant to fire at civilians under the Armed Forces doctrine. Evidence of decision making at the "highest levels" of government led the team to conclude the violence was "an effort to create a critical situation that required a form of extra-constitutional government to control the situation". However, its members admitted that the story lacked a crucial link between the military and rioters.

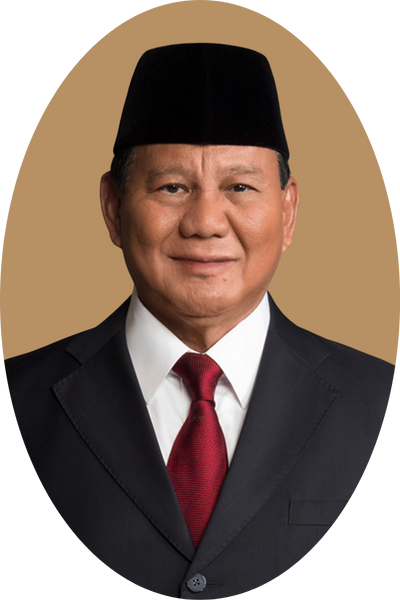
According to the fact-finding team, Lieutenant General Prabowo Subianto (later became president) was a key figure in military involvement with rioters in Jakarta.

Investigations revealed that violence in Jakarta was the result of an internal struggle within the military elite to become Suharto's successor, with evidence that some of the damaged areas were near military installations with reports that riot organisers had military-like characteristics. Many believed Kostrad commander Prabowo Subianto sought to become his father-in-law's successor and coveted the Commander of the Armed Forces position held by General Wiranto, who was favoured to succeed Suharto. He was also suspected of organising the kidnappings of students and activists prior to the 1997 election. Together with Operations Commander for Greater Jakarta (Panglima Komando Operasi Jakarta Raya, Pangkoops Jaya) Major General Sjafrie Sjamsoeddin, Prabowo aimed to terrorise opponents of the government and to show that Wiranto was "an incompetent commander who could not control disorder". During August and September, the fact-finding team interviewed Prabowo, Sjafrie, and other military commanders regarding their movements during the Jakarta riots. Prabowo asserted that he was unsure of the precise movements of military forces in the capital and deferred to Sjafrie. In the meantime, the Operations Commander was vague in his testimony and stated that security forces were protecting "priority locations".

In its final report, the fact-finding team suspected that, on the night of 14 May, Prabowo met with several Armed Forces and prominent civilian figures at the Kostrad headquarters to discuss the organisation of the violence. However, this was later refuted by several people who attended the meeting, including prominent human rights lawyer Adnan Buyung Nasution and TGPF member Bambang Widjojanto. Further testimonies by Prabowo in the years following the investigation contradicted the team's report and led to scepticism of the team's allegations. When Suharto resigned his mandate on 21 May, both Prabowo and Wiranto were bypassed in favour of a constitutional power transfer to Vice-president Habibie. Prabowo was transferred to a non-active position on the following day before being discharged from service in August. He and Wiranto denied that the discharge was a result of disciplinary action.

=== Effects on Chinese Indonesian communities ===
While the riot was triggered by an economic recession, its prime target was the ethnic Chinese community. The Chinese-Indonesian community was believed to have loyalties to both China and Indonesia, a sign that they had no national patriotism and were labeled as "traitors". During Suharto's New Order rule, multiple laws were passed against the ethnic Chinese community in Indonesia. These laws included prohibiting speaking any Chinese dialect publicly as well as the public display of Chinese characters, changing Chinese names to become Indonesian-sounding, and the restriction on celebrating the Lunar New Year. However, President Suharto kept a few Chinese-Indonesians by his side, primarily for business reasons. These individuals include "konglomerat" or business magnates such as Sofyan Wanandi, Sudono Salim, and Mochtar Riady. The image of the average Chinese-Indonesian became one of an affluent individual, sometimes seen by the public to be stealing wealth from Indonesians, although most were middle-class retailers. During this period, Chinese-Indonesians were increasingly contributing to the local retail industry. The resulting growth in income within the community led to the rise in prices of basic goods such as rice and oil to be associated with the Chinese, fuelling the existing anti-Chinese sentiment even more.

A portrait of ethnic Chinese tycoon Sudono Salim—one of the world's wealthiest men at the time—and his wife is burned by rioters when his Jakarta house was ransacked during the riots.

Provocateurs, suspected to be military, goaded rioters, screaming ethnic insults like "Cina babi!" (English: Chinese pigs!) and "Ganyang Cina!" (English: Slaughter/Massacre the Chinese!). The provocateurs also shouted commands, directing the riots towards Chinese-owned businesses and away from Native Indonesian-owned ones.

In this climate of fear, between 10,000 and 100,000 ethnic Chinese, who made up about 3–5% of Indonesia's Chinese population, fled the country. Thousands of foreign nationals and expatriates left Indonesia, some evacuated by their embassies.

==== Sexual violence ====
In the days during riots, many women suffered from sexual violence with most of the incidents taking place in Jakarta. The attacks appeared to be an organised campaign of assaults against ethnic Chinese women by the same groups that organised the riots. Accounts compiled by aid workers depicted a wide range of attacks from humiliation, child rape, and gang-rape followed by murder. More than a hundred women were reported to have been assaulted or killed. The Volunteer Team for Humanity recorded 168 cases of sexual assault, with 152 in Jakarta and the remaining 16 in Surakarta, Medan, Palembang, and Surabaya; of these victims, twenty had died by 14 July 1998.

The US State Department noted in its report:

Following the riots, allegations of mass rape of ethnic Chinese women were made, forcing the Government to establish a fact-finding team to investigate the riots and rapes. The team found that elements of the military had been involved in the riots, some of which were deliberately provoked. It also verified 66 rapes of women, the majority of whom were Sino-Indonesian, as well as numerous other acts of violence against women. The armed forces publicly acknowledged several areas of past human rights violations and launched still ongoing investigations into some of the worst violations.

The Indonesian government has responded with conflicting messages. President Habibie issued a statement acknowledging the violence and regretted it as "not in accordance with the cultural values of the Indonesian people" and condemned it in the name of the government and all Indonesians. However other authorities denied that any rape had taken place. The intelligence chief stated that the incident "was spread for political purposes to defame Indonesia" and the police commander threatened to prosecute any organisation publicising the rape issue on charges of spreading false rumours.

In the aftermath of the violence, JFF was tasked to document the rapes. After JFF reported that the violence had been organised, General Wiranto publicly apologised for the army's failure to prevent the violence and acknowledged that elements in the military were involved. In addition to government-mandated JFF, a special rapporteur was established by the United Nations to validate JFF findings and interview some of the victims. Both have officially reported that the sexual abuse in May 1998 did occur. The rapporteur noted that the difficulty of interviewing rape victims and lack of testimonials had been used to discredit the fact-finding effort and in one instance to twist it to portray that the incident was fabricated to raise resentment against Indonesian Muslims. In 2008, National Women Commission working together with the UN rapporteur issued recommendations to the government to adopt violence elimination, victim protection and recovery, gender awareness measures. These measures have been accepted and implemented into policies. However, the general public still refuses to acknowledge the rapes and legal proceeding against the perpetrators has stalled.

=== Legacy ===
To many Chinese-Indonesians, the event served as a reinforcement of the idea that they do not belong in Indonesia despite most of them having lived in the country all their lives. It is also believed that the event inspired change in the country's authoritarian policies that perpetuate the discrimination. The Reformasi period, when Suharto resigned and B.J. Habibie became president, saw a lot of changes in the country's values, including that of racial affairs. These changes include the abolishment of several laws that came into being during the New Order that specifically targeted the Chinese community, declaring Chinese New Year as a national holiday. Some believe that Indonesia is able to see an improvement in the implementation of its national motto "Bhinneka Tunggal Ika" which translates to "Unity In Diversity" and a greater acceptance of the Chinese-Indonesian community as a whole. This can be seen as greater forms of representation of the community in media, popular culture, and even politics that have been embraced by both the local community and the government. The rise of the Governor of Jakarta, Basuki Tjahaja Purnama, widely known as "Ahok", is an example of this. According to Leo Suryadinata, a professor focusing on Chinese Indonesian issues at the Nanyang Technological University in Singapore, "The lot of ethnic Chinese here has greatly improved since Suharto, but that doesn't mean the riots' underlying problems have been resolved." Others do still believe that the century-old tension between the native Indonesian community and the ethnic Chinese still persists within the Indonesian society while it does not affect one's day-to-day life.

== In popular culture ==
Dramas and other works of fiction have been written in response to the 1998 riots, especially regarding the racial aspects and rapes of Chinese Indonesian women. These include Putri Cina (English: Chinese Princess), by Indonesian Catholic priest and author Sindhunata, which deals with the loss of identity experienced by Chinese Indonesians after the riots and is written in part from the point of view of a rape victim. A more general view of the 1998 events is given in the film Di Balik Pintu Istana (Behind 98).

== See also ==
- Fall of Suharto
- Post-Suharto era in Indonesia

== Bibliography ==
=== Scholarly works ===
- McGlynn, John H.; et al. (2007) [2005]. Indonesia in the Soeharto Years: Issues, Incidents and Images (2nd ed.). Jakarta: The Lontar Foundation. ISBN 978-9971-69-358-9.
- Ong, Aihwa (2005). "Chinese Diaspora Politics and Its Fallout in a Cyber Age". In Ember, Melvin; Ember, Carol R. & Skoggard, Ian (eds.). Encyclopedia of Diasporas: Immigrant and Refugee Cultures Around the World. New York, N.Y.: Springer Science+Business Media. pp. 392–403. ISBN 978-0-387-29904-4.
- Purdey, Jemma (2006). Anti-Chinese Violence in Indonesia, 1996–1999. Honolulu, H.I.: University of Hawaii Press. ISBN 978-0-8248-3057-1.
- Setiono, Benny G. (2003). Tionghoa dalam Pusaran Politik [Indonesia's Chinese Community under Political Turmoil] (in Indonesian). Jakarta: Elkasa. ISBN 978-979-96887-4-3.
- Suryadinata, Leo (2004). "Chinese Migration and Adaptation in Southeast Asia: The Last Half-Century". In Ananta, Aris & Arifin, Evi Nurvidya (eds.). International Migration in Southeast Asia. Singapore: Institute of Southeast Asian Studies. pp. 71–93. ISBN 978-981-230-278-6.

=== Reports ===
- Hamid, Usman; Prasetyo, Stanley Yosep Adi; Zen, A. Patra M. & Hutapea, Hotma Timbul (2005). Menatap Wajah Korban: Upaya Mendorong Penyelesaian Hukum Kejahatan Terhadap Kemanusiaan Dalam Peristiwa Kerusuhan Mei 1998 (in Indonesian). Jakarta: Solidaritas Nusa Bangsa. ISBN 978-979-96038-4-5.
- Jusuf, Ester Indahyani & Simanjorang, Raymond R. (2005). Reka Ulang Kerusuhan Mei 1998 (in Indonesian). Jakarta: Tim Solidaritas Kasus Kerusuhan Mei 1998. ISBN 978-979-96038-5-2.
- Tim Gabungan Pencari Fakta (1998). Laporan Akhir Peristiwa Kerusuhan Tanggal 13–15 Mei: Jakarta, Solo, Palembang, Lampung, Surabaya dan Medan (in Indonesian). Jakarta: Tim Gabungan Pencari Fakta. OCLC 318092229.
