= Injo Beng Goat =

Injo Beng Goat

Injo Beng Goat (Chinese: 杨明月, 1902 - 1962) was a Chinese Indonesian journalist, lawyer, and political activist of the late Dutch East Indies and early independence era in Indonesia. He was editor-in-chief of Keng Po, one of the largest newspapers of the early independence period, until 1958.

== Biography ==
Injo Beng Goat was born in 1904, likely in Bengkulu, Sumatra, Dutch East Indies. He received his primary education in a Dutch-language school.

He studied law at the Rechts Hogere School in Batavia. After graduation he became a journalist, often publishing under the pen name Intipus or Intipias due to the colony's strict censorship laws. He also become involved in politics, serving as an executive member of the Ta Hsioh Sing Hwee in Batavia the second half of the 1920s. He became an editor at Keng Po in 1934; at some point he was promoted to editor-in-chief, although it is not clear when. During the prewar years he defended China in the pages of the paper and adopted a strong line against Japan and the Japanese invasion of China. He also wrote short stories, printing them in magazines such as Star Monthly.

In early 1939, Injo and fellow Keng Po editor Zain Sanibar were brought to court under a press offence over an article they had printed about the Regent of Pandeglang a year earlier. Almost immediately Injo was brought before the court once again for an insulting article he printed about Adolf Hitler, calling him a fool who had been unpopular in school, bad with women, constantly having suicidal thoughts, an illegitimate child, and so on. When brought before a magistrate in Batavia, Injo was unrepentant and did not think he had done anything wrong, but merely described Hitler accurately.

Like a growing minority of Chinese Indonesian intellectuals which included Kwee Hing Tjiat and Soe Hok Gie, Injo was increasingly sympathetic to Indonesian nationalism during the late colonial era, rather than being a Chinese nationalist focused more narrowly on overseas Chinese issues. Injo was imprisoned by the Japanese during the Japanese occupation of the Dutch East Indies and Keng Po was shut down along with most other independent press. Injo was arrested in May 1943 and sent to Serang in Banten and then to Cimahi. After Indonesia declared independence in 1945, despite Sukarno's former pro-Japanese stance, Injo joined the republican side and often gave pro-independence speeches in Purwokerto. During this time, in 1946-7, he worked for a Dutch-language republican magazine called Het Inzicht (the insight) which was edited by Soedjatmoko. Keng Po also resumed publication in 1946; it soon grew to become one of the most-read newspapers in Indonesia and an important source of independent critical coverage.

Injo was opposed to the Communist Party of Indonesia, which was a major component of the independence struggle against the Dutch; however, he was sympathetic to the Socialist Party of Indonesia. He was also involved in trade union activism and Chinese Indonesian politics via the Sin Ming Hui (New Light Association) which was founded in 1946. He was also elected as chairperson of the Federation of All-Indonesia Labour Unions (Indonesian: Federasi Perkumpulan Buruh Seluruh Indonesia), a federation of 12 mostly Chinese labour unions, in May 1947. However, this federation did not last long as tension between Communists and non-Communists, and the relative exclusion of non-Chinese members, made it gradually become irrelevant.

From 1948-50 and 1951-3 he was an executive member of the Chinese Indonesian Democratic Party (Indonesian: Partai Demokrat Tionghoa Indonesia). He was also involved in the Consultative Council for Indonesian Citizenship (commonly known by its Indonesian acronym Baperki), although he resigned from it in 1955 along with Tan Po Goan, Khoe Woen Sioe and Petrus Kanisius Ojong when they became convinced it was too much under the influence of the Communist Party.

In May 1957, not long after the shift towards so-called Guided Democracy and martial law over the press, Injo was arrested by Indonesian military police for something he had printed in Keng Po. He had reported on a statement by then-Prime Minister Djuanda Kartawidjaja about Lt. Col. Ventje Sumual's dismissal which was later denied by the Information Ministry. Hence it was not so much a matter of printing falsehoods as having repeated something from a non-official military source. Journalists Dick Joseph of Marinjo and Mochtar Lubis were arrested on similar charges. After spending some weeks in military custody, Injo was released under city arrest in Jakarta; he stepped down as editor-in-chief at Keng Po in 1958, finding the position of the paper untenable in the new political situation. That same year, under the new anti-Chinese policies Keng Po changed its name to Pos Indonesia (Indonesia Post); it ceased publication in the 1960s.

In March 1960 Injo, along with a group of ten Peranakan intellectuals which included Ojong, Ong Hok Ham and Tjung Tin Jan published a manifesto in Star Weekly entitled "Towards voluntary assimilation" (Indonesian: Menudju ke Asimilasi jang Wadjar) which opposed the politics of integration advanced by Siauw Giok Tjhan and others and suggested a policy of gradual and consensual assimilation into Indonesian society as a solution to ethnic conflict.

Injo died in Jakarta on 1 November 1962.
