= Tjung Tin Jan =

Indonesian politician and lawyer

Mr. Tjung Tin Jan
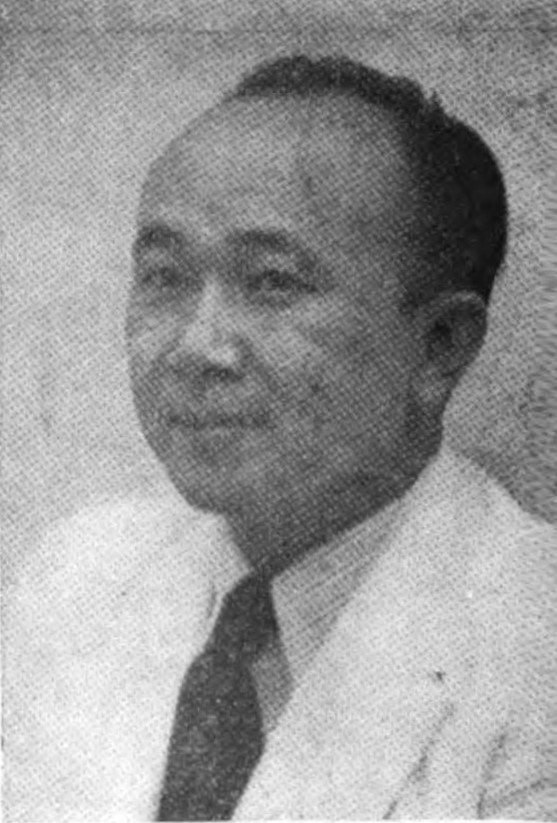

Member of People's Representative Council
- In office 1950–1960

United States of Indonesia Senator from Bangka
- In office 16 February 1950 – 16 August 1950

Personal details
- Born: Zhong Dingyuan 钟鼎远; 9 February 1919 Sungai Selan, Bangka, Dutch East Indies
- Died: February 1994 (aged 74–75) Jakarta, Indonesia
- Party: Catholic Party
- Education: Leiden University

Mr. Tjung Tin Jan (9 February 1919 – February 1994) or Jani Arsadjaja was an Indonesian politician and lawyer of Chinese Indonesian origin.

== Early life and education ==
Tjung was born in Sungai Selan, part of what is today Central Bangka Regency of Bangka Island, then part of the Dutch East Indies, on 9 February 1919. He studied at a Recht Hogeschool in Batavia, before heading to the Netherlands to study law at the Leiden University, and he received a Master of Laws degree.

== Career ==
After Tjung returned to the Indies, he had worked at a telephone company and became a lawyer before being appointed as a deputy prosecutor in Pangkal Pinang's court. He also founded, and later led, the Bangka branch of the Chinese Association. Additionally, he acted as a legal adviser to a Chinese school in Pangkal Pinang. In 1950, he was appointed as a Senator for the newly formed Senate of the United States of Indonesia, representing Bangka.

In 1950, following the Senate's dissolution and the defederation of the United States of Indonesia, Tjung was appointed to the Provisional People's Representative Council as a "minority representative", alongside several other Chinese Indonesian politicians. He joined the Catholic Party in 1953, and he served in the People's Representative Council as a member of that party until 1960. Within that party, he was a member of its central board between 1953 and 1959, and its deputy general chairman between 1956 and 1958.

During and after his time in the council, Tjung served as a director of several mining companies, including at Aneka Tambang where he was its financial director between 1968 and 1974. He died in February 1994.

== Views ==
Tjung was a proponent of the assimilation of Chinese Indonesians, and was critical of Yap Thiam Hien's writings on discrimination of the group within Indonesia. One example of such a critique was titled Indonesia Bukan Amerika (Indonesia is not the United States), published in 1960, in response to one of Hien's essays earlier that year. In the same year he was also a signatory to the manifesto "Towards voluntary assimilation" (Indonesian: Menudju ke Asimilasi jang Wadjar) published in Star Weekly. This manifesto, which may have been spearheaded by Ong Hok Ham, opposed the politics of integration advanced by Siauw Giok Tjhan and BAPERKI, which advocated for a distinct Chinese identity within a multiethnic Indonesia, and instead called for gradual and consensual assimilation into Indonesian society as a solution to ethnic conflict.
