= Star Weekly (Indonesian magazine) =

Indonesian magazine (1946–1961)

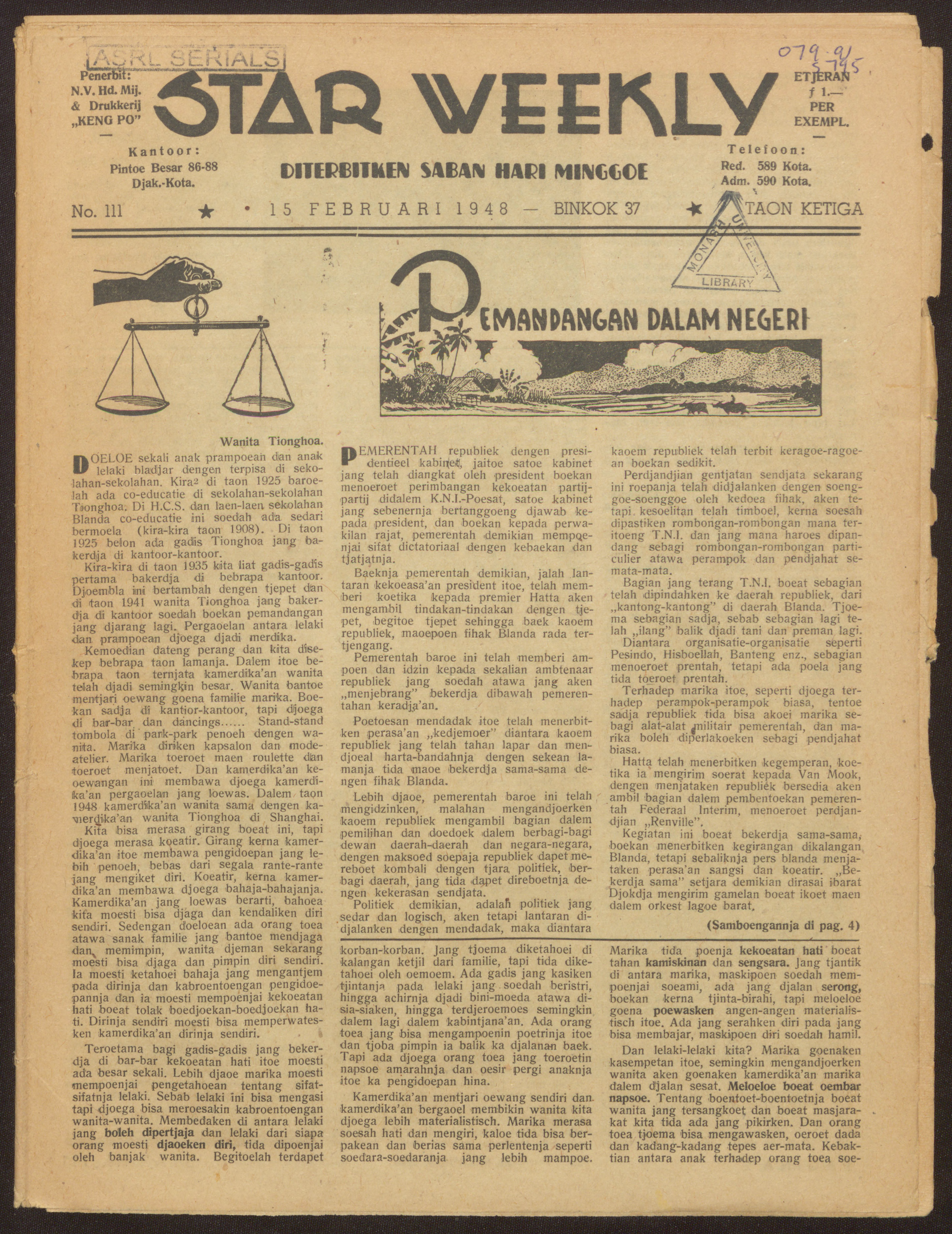
- Front page, 15 February 1948
- Editor: Tan Hian Lay, P. K. Ojong
- Frequency: weekly
- Circulation: 60,000 (1961)
- Publisher: Khoe Woen Sioe
- Founded: 1946
- Final issue: 8 October 1961
- Company: Keng Po
- Country: Indonesia
- Based in: Jakarta
- Language: Indonesian

Star Weekly was an Indonesian language magazine published in Jakarta, Indonesia from 1946 to 1961. The magazine was an offshoot of the popular newspaper Keng Po and is considered to be a precursor to today's Kompas. Through its charismatic editor P. K. Ojong it became a widely-respected forum for Chinese Indonesian intellectual discussion, cultural expression, and critical political coverage.

The magazine also printed pieces by a number of notable Indonesian writers of the early independence era, including Pramoedya Ananta Toer, Trisno Sumardjo, Onghokham, Suwarsih Djojopuspito, and Ajip Rosidi.

== History ==
=== Early years ===
Star Weekly was the group effort of a number of Peranakan journalists who had been active in the late colonial era in the Dutch East Indies but who had been censored or even imprisoned during the Japanese occupation of the Dutch East Indies. It was launched in January 1946 as a monthly magazine published by the daily newspaper Keng Po and its publisher Khoe Woen Sioe. (According to some sources, it was a relaunching of a short-lived magazine published by Keng Po from 1939 to 1941 called Star Magazine, although that publication had a different format and editorial board.) The first editor-in-chief of Star Weekly was Tan Hian Lay. Petrus Kanisius Ojong, a prominent businessman and journalist who was editor-in-chief of Keng Po, joined the editorial board and writers of Star Weekly and would soon become one of its key figures. Like Keng Po, Star Weekly was loosely affiliated with the Socialist Party (Indonesia). Because the Indonesian National Revolution was still underway, and Star Weekly was published in Dutch-held territory, it had to abide by censorship of military reports and be wary of seeming to be a tool of the Indonesian Republicans. During the wartime years the paper also advocated for the Chinese population of Displaced Persons in Java who did not have the support of a foreign embassy due to the ongoing Chinese Civil War.

As it established itself, Star Weekly joined a booming market of Chinese Indonesian magazines in the late 1940s, including Java Critic and Pantjawarna. It was less flashy than its competitors which had colourful glossy covers; Star Weekly's cover looked more like a newspaper. However, although it was not the most stylish publication, Star Weekly became known for its sophisticated debate and excellent writing on a variety of topics, and was soon considered required reading for young Chinese and non-Chinese Indonesian intellectuals. It also contained lighter fare, including food and cooking content, comics, fashion and fiction (including Kung Fu stories).

=== After Indonesian independence ===
After the Dutch–Indonesian Round Table Conference in 1949 Indonesia gained its independence and Star Weekly now found itself in the capital of the new republic. In the early independence era its parent newspaper Keng Po become one of the most-read papers and Star Weekly continued to build its readership as well. In 1951 P. K. Ojong, who had already been on the editorial board for several years, became editor-in-chief, and Tan Hian Lay remained as the second most senior editor. He became a driving force behind the magazine; he was very widely read, was a dedicated fan of British historian Arnold J. Toynbee, and socialized with many up-and-coming academics and intellectuals who he recruited to write for the paper. He also strongly believed that Chinese Indonesians should participate more closely in the politics and lives of their non-Chinese Indonesian neighbors, and he often steered the magazine's content towards this "assimilationist" approach.

Among its popular fare in this era was Siauw Tik Kwie's Wuxia comic Sie Djien Koei which ran weekly starting in 1954.The magazine continued to rise in popularity, reaching a circulation of around 51,000 in 1958.

In 1957 Ong Hok Ham, then a university student, was introduced to P. K. Ojong and was invited to write for the magazine. Among his early contributions in 1958 was a well-regarded series on Chinese Indonesian history. Over the next 3 years he wrote many more articles, including light promotional pieces and well-argued historical ones.

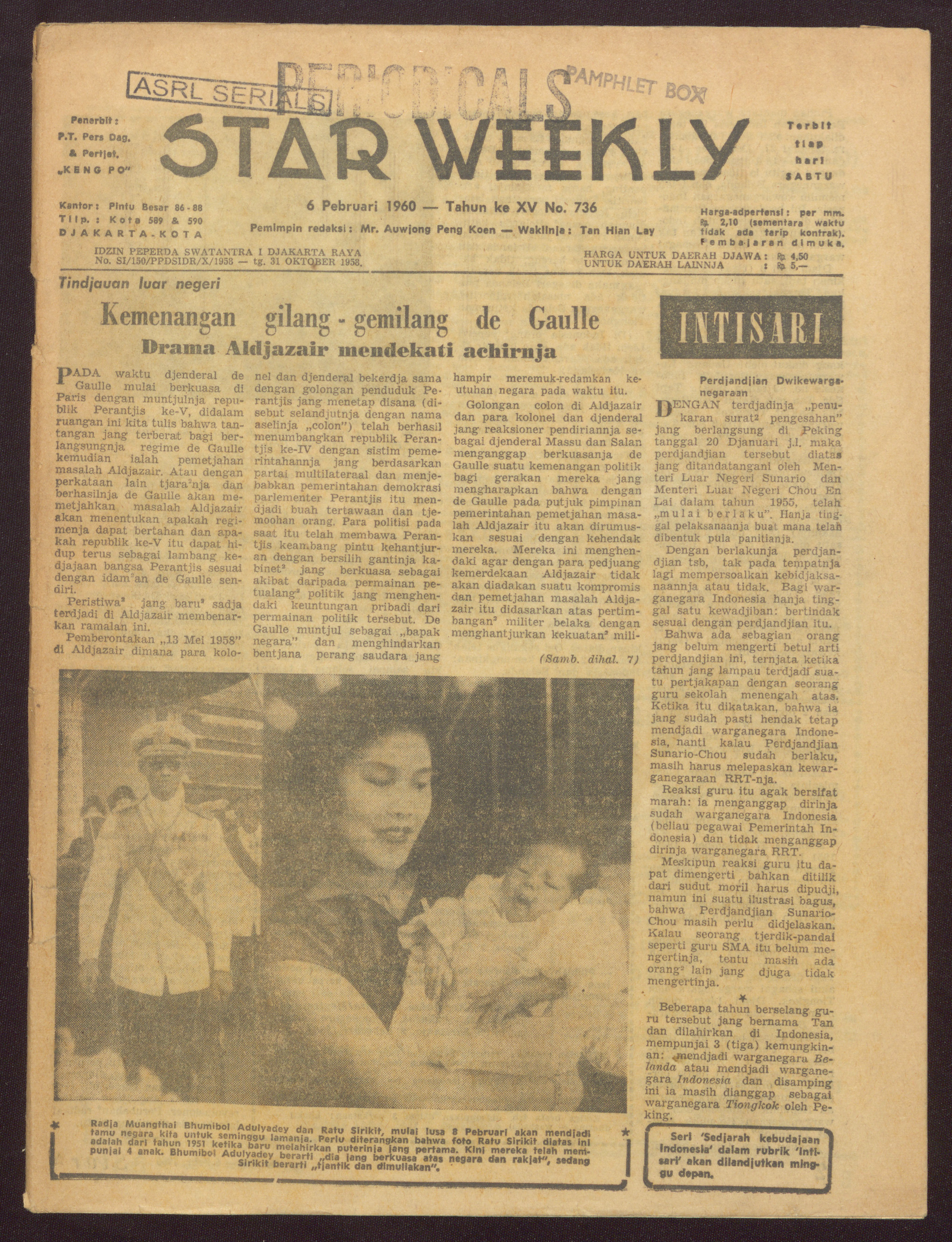
Star Weekly cover, 6 February 1960

In the late 1950s, with the transition to the Guided Democracy period, the magazine suffered from increased state censorship and persecution. It parent newspaper Keng Po rebranded itself Pos Indonesia (Indonesia Post) in 1958, and Star Weekly was likewise pressured to become more "Indonesian" and less Chinese. New press regulations introduced in 1960 required publications to declare loyalty to the government and its aims, which many serious publications balked at. The magazine started to be hit with repeated sanctions and printing restrictions from the government, and its editors started making plans for what to do if it was shut down completely.

=== Assimilation manifesto ===
As a magazine reflecting left-wing, pro-Indonesian Peranakan Chinese intellectuals, Star Weekly often printed political statements, discussions, and manifestos. A noteworthy one was printed in the 26 March 1960 issue called "Towards voluntary assimilation" (Indonesian: Menudju ke Asimilasi jang Wadjar). This manifesto, which may have been spearheaded by Ong Hok Ham, opposed the politics of integration advanced by Siauw Giok Tjhan and BAPERKI, which advocated for a distinct Chinese identity within a multiethnic Indonesia, and instead called for gradual and consensual assimilation into Indonesian society as a solution to ethnic conflict. This manifesto was signed by ten Peranakan intellectuals: editors P. K. Ojong and Injo Beng Goat, student Ong Hok Ham, university lecturer Lo Sian Hien, engineer Tan Bian Seng, economist Lauwchuantho, pharmacist Kwee Hwat Djien, lawyer Tjung Tin Jan, Tantekhian, and Tjia Dji Siong. The manifesto launched several weeks of debate and responses from other Chinese Indonesian publications, and drove Star Weekly and Ong Hok Ham to become more widely known. The circulation of the magazine rose to around 60,000 by its final year.

=== Closure ===
Despite growing its readership again after 1960, the magazine suffered greatly from censorship during the Guided Democracy period. Demoralized and blacklisted, P. K. Ojong struggled to remain as head of the magazine. The closeness of Ojong, Star Weekly and Pos Indonesia to the Socialist Party also made them a target. Star Weekly was finally shut down permanently by the Indonesian government in 1961; its final issue was printed on 8 October.

Khoe, the publisher of Star Weekly, directed some of the former leaders of the magazine to work for his new book publishing firm PT Saka Widya. P. K. Ojong, meanwhile, laid the groundwork to found a new publication which could survive in the new political and legal climate. In June 1965 he converted the conservative magazine Kompas into a daily with the support of prominent Catholic Indonesians; it was willing to sign the pledge of loyalty to the government and hence was able to survive through most of the Suharto era. It has since grown to become one of Indonesia's main publications. Another longtime editor at Star Weekly named Kho Tiang Hoen (Harjoko Trisnadi) also went on to found Tempo Magazine.
