= Tan Po Goan =

Chinese Indonesian lawyer and politician

- 陈宝源
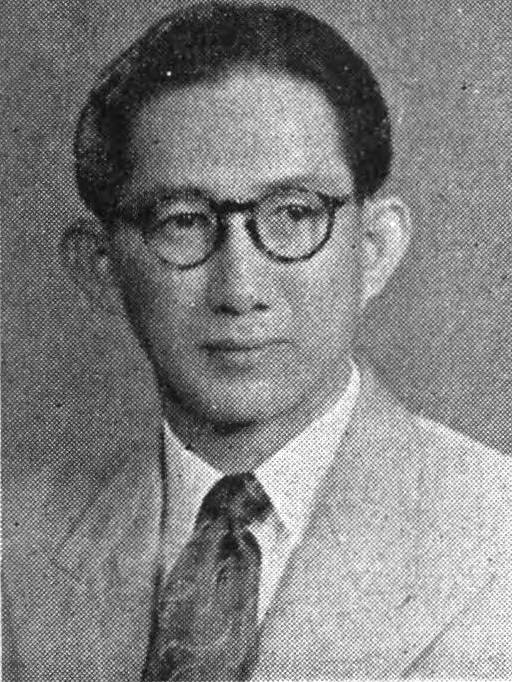
- Born: 24 October 1911; Cianjur, Dutch East Indies
- Died: November 1985 (aged 74); Sydney, Australia
- Occupations: lawyer, politician, writer

Tan Po Goan (Chinese: 陈宝源, 1911–1985), sometimes spelled Tan Po Gwan, was a Chinese Indonesian lawyer and Socialist Party of Indonesia politician. He was a Minister without portfolio representing the Chinese community in the Third Sjahrir Cabinet (1946–7), making him possibly the first Chinese Indonesian to be appointed to ministerial rank. As a Socialist Party representative in the Provisional House of Representatives from 1950 to 1956, he was involved in a number of high-profile matters relating to citizenship and civil rights.

== Biography ==
=== Early life and law career ===
Tan Po Goan was born in Cianjur, Batavia Residency, Dutch East Indies (now in West Java, Indonesia) on 24 October 1911. He was of Peranakan Chinese descent. He was educated at an Algemene middelbare school in Bandung. In 1932 he enrolled in the law program at the Rechtshoogeschool te Batavia, the precursor to today's Faculty of Law, University of Indonesia. He graduated in 1937 Master of Laws (Meester in de rechten) degree.

After graduating he moved to Makassar to open a law practice and become an officer of the court at the Raad van Justitie (a local higher court). He worked there for two years, and in January 1939 he requested and obtained an honorary discharge and returned to Java, taking up a similar post at the Raad van Justitie in Surabaya. During his time there, he became involved in journalism and started writing for the popular Chinese Indonesian newspaper Sin Po. He also joined the prestigious law firm of Lie Hwee Yoe, with which he would have a longstanding association. He continued working as a lawyer and writing for Sin Po until the Japanese invasion of the Dutch East Indies in 1942; during this era he was a popular and well-connected figure and known as a bon vivant. In 1942 he was then interned by the Japanese, along with many Chinese Indonesian intellectuals.

=== Indonesian national revolution and early political career ===
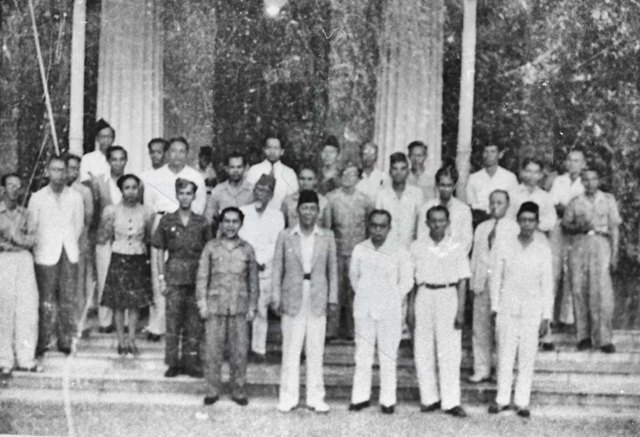
Members of the Third Sjahrir Cabinet in 1946

He was freed after the end of the war and became involved in politics in newly independent Indonesia, and was a supporter of the Republican side against the Dutch in the Indonesian National Revolution. The Indonesian Republic offered the opportunity for people of Chinese descent to become citizens; under the Dutch system, they had been considered subjects of China. Tan obtained Indonesian citizenship in the summer of 1946 and also joined the board of Sutan Sjahrir's Socialist Party of Indonesia. On 2 October 1946 he was appointed a Minister of state (Minister without portfolio) representing the Chinese community in the Third Sjahrir Cabinet. The purpose of his appointment was partly to try and work through the difficult relations between native Indonesians and Chinese Indonesians during the war against the Dutch. It was received positively by his old Sin Po, which saw it as a significant move and more than a token gesture by the Republican government. He did face some difficulties; in early 1947 he was accused of blocking the evacuation of Chinese Indonesians from Republican to Dutch-held territory; he denied it and insisted that it was the Dutch who had limited the number of refugees they were allowing into the parts of Java they controlled.

On 3 March 1947 he was appointed to the 47-member Working Committee of the Central Indonesian National Committee (KNIP), again representing the Chinese community. This was the fifth meeting of the KNIP which met in Malang and ratified the Linggadjati Agreement. In his role representing the Chinese he still had to intervene to help Chinese residents who were in some cases being persecuted by Republican forces, as in Demak Regency in July. Not long after, he stepped down from his position as advocate for the Chinese.

In August 1949 he traveled with a delegation to Schipol in the Netherlands to participate in the Dutch–Indonesian Round Table Conference.

=== Provisional House of Representatives (1950-1956) ===
Following the signing of the Round Table agreement and the passing of the Provisional Constitution of 1950, KNIP was expanded into the Provisional House of Representatives and a number of former KNIP members were appointed to it. Tan joined as a representative of the 15-member Socialist Party faction under Soebadio Sastrosatomo. He was also briefly a member of the Chinese Indonesian Democratic Party (Partai Demokrat Tionghoa Indonesia, PDTI) for a time, though he formally left it in 1953.

One of his most high-profile moments during that session was his public advocacy for left-wingers and Chinese Indonesians arrested and held without charge in the August 1951 mass arrests. After months of extralegal detention of thousands of citizens by the Soekiman Cabinet, he led an effort to put an official Interpellation to the government. He worried that hundreds of people had been held in Jakarta arrests since August and none had been convicted yet, due to the weak legal basis for their arrest. He led several rounds of debate with the government on this matter over a two month period. In November, Tan and some of the left-wing parties tried to pass a censure motion against Soekiman, but were voted down.

Another cause of his during that session was press freedom. At that time the censorship laws from the Dutch East Indies were still in force in Indonesia, and in late 1953 he advanced a motion to defend the national journalist's union from persecution by Minister of Information Ferdinand Lumban Tobing. It was supported by Masyumi and the Socialist Party, but voted down by a majority which included the Indonesian National Party (PNI) and the Communist Party of Indonesia (PKI). The following summer, he advanced a cross-party motion to finally do away with the Dutch press censorship laws; in this he enlisted the support parliamentarians Peris Pardede and Siauw Giok Tjhan (PKI), Yunan Nasution (Masyumi), Rasuna Said (unaffiliated). The House passed the motion and Minister Tobing agreed to pursue the abolishment of press laws after some consultation.

Another affair he became involved in was a Motion of no confidence he advanced against the Minister of Justice Djody Gondokusumo, who was involved in the deportation of two high-profile Kuomintang-supporting Chinese Indonesians, Tjong Hoen Ni and Chu Chan Tang. Part of the problem was that, according to regulations, the Minister had essentially unchecked power to deport foreigners from Indonesia. The case of Tjong in particular became a cause for members of Masyumi and the Socialist Party in the autumn of 1954, expressing their opposition to First Ali Sastroamidjojo Cabinet. Tan objected to the method in which Tjong had been deported for his political activities and that he had been officially deported to the People's Republic of China, which could have ended in a death sentence. The reason for this was that Indonesia recognized the PRC over Taiwan and considered Chinese Indonesians who had not taken on Indonesian citizenship after independence to be citizens of the PRC. With the help of the Philippines Embassy in Jakarta, Tjong was able to go to the Philippines and then to Taiwan instead, where Chu Chan Tang had also ended up. Tan's non-confidence measure was eventually defeated in the house in mid-April 1955, but the process revealed some embarrassing documents showing the government had mishandled the situation with Tjong. Sosrodanukusumo, the head of investigations in the Ministry of Justice, was fired as a result. Tan continue to pursue then ex-Minister Djody in the courts, accusing him of having accepted bribes in exchange for residency permits. Djody was eventually found guilty in the Supreme Court of Indonesia in January 1956 and sentenced to a year in prison.

Tan joined the Consultative Council for Indonesian Citizenship (BAPERKI), a progressive and pro-integration Indonesian Chinese organization, in 1954 and was nominated to run for it in the 1955 Indonesian legislative election. However, he withdrew his membership and candidacy with BAPERKI in May 1955, decided to run again with the Socialists (PSI). Supposedly part of his reason for withdrawing from BAPERKI was that they wanted to dictate which positions he was to take in the House, and also concerns that it was becoming increasingly close to the Communist Party. He campaigned in the 1955 election with Sutan Sjahrir, Injo Beng Goat, Maria Ulfah Santoso, and others from the PSI slate. The party only received 2% of the vote and sat five members in the House; Tan was not among them.

=== Later life ===
In March 1957, Tan was called in to face a Military Police commander along with 11 other civil servants who were suspected of corruption, although he does not seem to have been found guilty of anything. He was abroad in 1958 when the Permesta rebellion broke out, which implicated some of his Socialist Party colleagues. Feeling alienated by the direction of Indonesian politics thereafter, and possibly worried about being arrested in connection with the Permesta rebellion, he stayed abroad for a decade. He briefly returned after Sukarno's death. He had been living in Singapore and Thailand during that decade; when he tried to rejoin his old law firm, they refused, possibly out of fear of his political associations.

He decided to leave again and settled in Sydney, Australia. He died in Sydney in November 1985.
