= Siauw Tik Kwie =

Indonesian painter and comic artist (1913–1988)

- Born: 21 June 1913; Surakarta, Dutch East Indies
- Died: 16 April 1988 (aged 74); Indonesia
- Education: Batavia Kunstkring, Press Art School
- Known for: Sie Djien Koei martial arts comic series (1954–61), realist paintings and watercolours (1930s–80s)
- Style: realist
- Spouse: Tan Poen Nio

Siauw Tik Kwie (Chinese: 萧德贵, 1913–1988), who sometimes wrote under the pen name Ki Oto Suastika, was a Chinese Indonesian realist painter, translator, and illustrator. He is best known for his weekly Wuxia comic strip Sie Djien Koei which appeared in Star Weekly from 1954 to 1961. He continued to paint realist paintings, often of urban and working class scenes in Jakarta, until his death in 1988.

== Biography ==
Siauw Tik Kwie was born into a Chinese Indonesian family in Surakarta, Dutch East Indies on 23 June 1913. His parents were Siauw Gwan Lie and Poa Tjin Nio. He received a Chinese primary school education at a Tiong Hoa Hwee Koan in Surakarta from 1920–27. After dropping out of school he spent a few years working for his uncles' companies in Surakarta and Wonogiri Regency. A chance encounter with journalist and intellectual Kwee Tek Hoay at a Tridharma conference convinced him to get involved in the press, and he relocated to Batavia, living with Kwee and working for his magazines. In 1932–33 he studied art with the Bataviasche Kunstkring in Batavia, working with local artists such as Sterneberg, Velthuisen, van Hove and Frank. During this era he befriended Kho Wan Gie, a fellow student in the Kunstkring who would also later become a comic artist. In 1934–35 completed a correspondence course from the Press Art School in London. He displayed pieces in group exhibitions put on by the Kunstkring and the Tiong Hoa Hwee Koan in Batavia in 1937 and 1938, presenting watercolour paintings of the urban landscape of the city. In 1938 he married his wife Tan Poen Nio. For the last few years of Dutch rule he worked as a designer for various advertising firms around Java and as an illustrator for Chinese Indonesian publications. His final art show before the outbreak of war in 1942 seems to have been a joint show with Tan Liep Poen and other Chinese artists at the G. Kolff & Co. gallery in August 1941.

During the war, Siauw and his wife returned to Surakarta and he made a living teaching painting. During this time he worked at translating various philosophical Tridharma writings into Indonesian. During the Indonesian National Revolution he supported pro-republic Chinese groups in Surakarta, including Tony Wen's Chinese Rebel Front (Indonesian: Barisan Pemberontak Tionghoa). In 1949 Siauw and his wife moved back to Jakarta (formerly Batavia) and he returned to making designs for advertisements as well as illustrating for the new literary magazine Star Weekly.

In 1954 Star Weekly editors Tan Hian Lay and P. K. Ojong asked him to illustrate a weekly comic strip for the magazine. Siauw created the comic, called Sie Djien Koei after its titular character, based on Wuxia writer and translator Oey Kim Tiang's popular texts. It was set during the Tang dynasty in China; it followed the adventures of a commoner called Sie Djien Koei who caught the attention of a wealthy nobleman and had various adventures. The comic became very popular and helped kickstart a martial arts trend in Indonesian comics, displacing western comics such as Tarzan and Flash Gordon. Siauw had never been to China, so he illustrated the comics in India ink from his imagination, drawing references from martial arts clubs, temples, and Beijing opera in Indonesia. By the end of his run he had illustrated 700 pages of this incredibly popular comic. Siauw intended to write a sequel called Hong Kiauw-Lie Tan which would depict the lives of Sie Djien Koei's grandchildren, but the forced closure of Star Weekly in October 1961 due to government censorship denied him that opportunity. He did write another comic called Kang Lam Hiap Soe which was also a wuxia story adapted from Oey Kim Tiang's writings.

Due to the popularity of Sie Djien Koei, it continued to be printed in new book editions in the 1970s and 1980s; he donated the royalties to the Tridharma Foundation. During the Indonesian mass killings of 1965–66 he went into hiding for a time, but later reemerged. In his later years, Siauw became known for his realist paintings, with even President Sukarno being a fan of his. He often painted common people and workers in naturalistic urban settings. He held solo exhibitions with the Cultural Council (Indonesian: Balai Budaya) in Jakarta in 1965, 1968, 1969 and 1971. From the 1960s till the end of his life he took on students such as Jap Hian Tjay and Robby Lulianto, and often brought them to various parts of Jakarta to paint urban life.

With the support of Tjokroatmodjo, a collector of his art, he finally visited the setting of Sie Djien Koei, Kweilin, in late 1987. He died not long after his return to Indonesia, on 16 April 1988.
