= Censorship in Indonesia =

Censorship in Indonesia has varied since the country declared its independence in 1945. For most of its history the government of Indonesia has not fully allowed free speech and has censored Western movies, books, films, and music as well. However, partly due to the weakness of the state and cultural factors, it has never been a country with full censorship where no critical voices were able to be printed or voiced.

Indonesia inherited a number of strict press censorship laws from their former Dutch rulers which remained on the books until the 1950s. These included potential criminal charges for journalists who disturbed the peace or defamed government officials. During the early independence years and the Liberal democracy period in Indonesia there was a relative lack of censorship; it was only in the second half of the 1950s, during the transition to Guided Democracy in Indonesia, that journalists began to be imprisoned again and editorial policies were forced to be integrated with the interests of the state. That policy of integration and repression continued into the New Order period which lasted from 1966 to 1998; during that era the total number of news publications were severely limited and could have their licenses pulled for printing materials the government did not like. During that period films and books were also heavily censored, with novelists and journalists imprisoned in internment camps. After 1998 and the fall of the New Order, Indonesia has seen a period of liberalization of the press, publishing and filmmaking, although there have still been local efforts to censor some materials.

== Background ==
=== Dutch East Indies and Japanese occupation ===
Before the Twentieth century, censorship in the Dutch East Indies was mostly focused on the European-language press and books and ensuring that trade or military facts did not fall into the hands of enemy nations, or in protecting the reputation of government officials. Printed matter had to be inspected by censors before they could be distributed, and presses were often permanently closed by the state, or their publishers were subjected to endless court cases. It was only in the 1910s, with the rise of Indonesian nationalism, that Dutch authorities began to focus on the colony's growing vernacular press, which was printed mainly in Malay but also in Javanese, Chinese, and other languages. In 1914 it passed the so-called "Hate-sowing articles" (Haatzaai artikelen) which attached criminal consequences to any speech which was deemed to disturb the peace between races; this often included criticism of colonial officials or European rule. The "hate-sowing articles" were often used as the legal pretext to punish native journalists who printed articles critical of wartime policy or political repression.

In the 1930s, censorship and political repression, especially of Indonesians, escalated to the point of operating essentially as a police state, with regular intimidation, extralegal detention, and exile of journalists and intellectuals. A new Press Curbing Ordinance (Persbreidelordonnatie) was passed in 1931 which gave the Governor General extreme powers to detain, blacklist, censor or imprison editors. In the five years after it was passed, around 27 Indonesian nationalist newspapers were shut down, as well as 5 Dutch ones; whereas previous regulations had targeted journalists, these new ones allowed for the shuttering of publications as well.

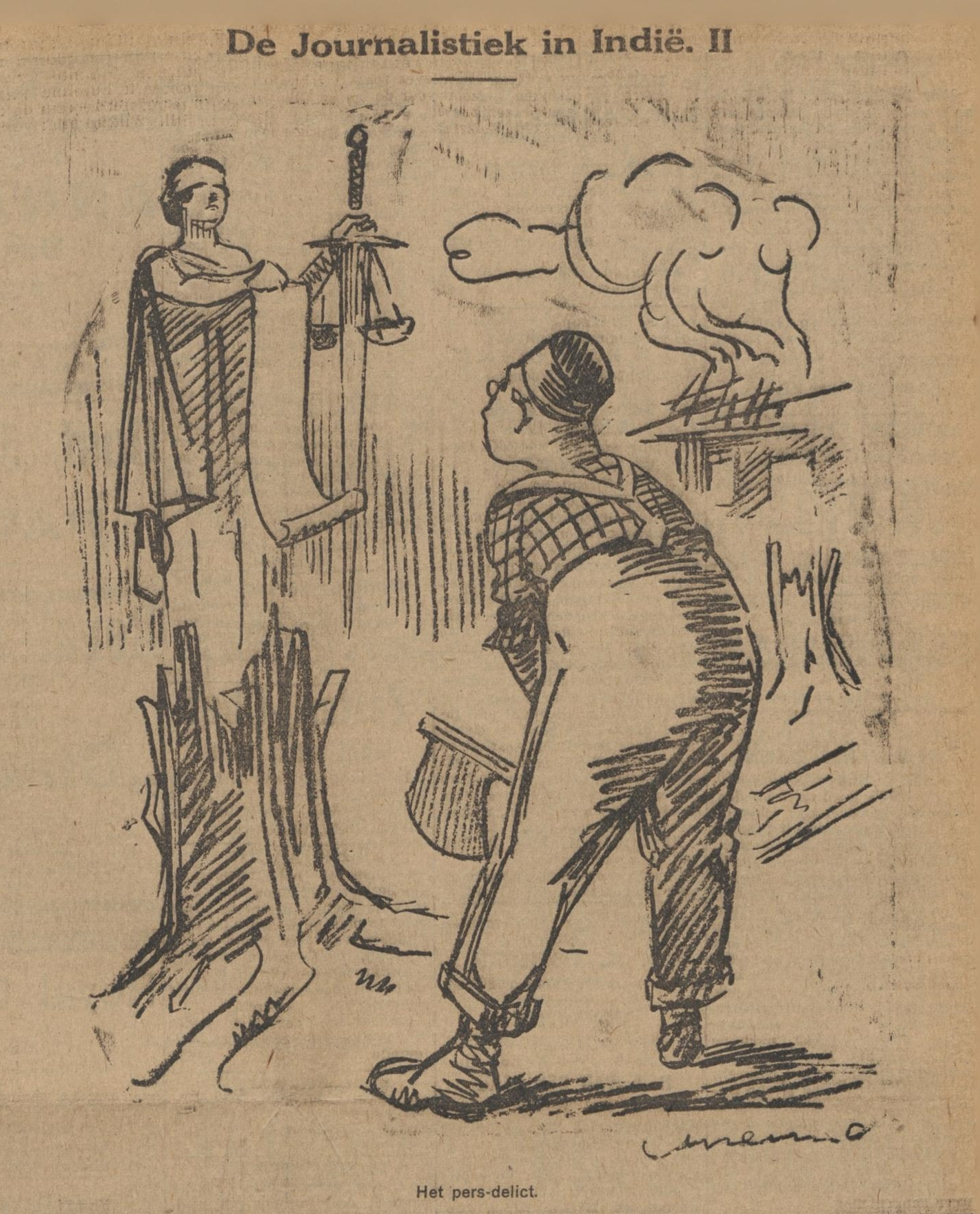
Censorship cartoon from Het nieuws van den dag voor Nederlandsch-Indië 29 July 1922

During the Japanese occupation of the Dutch East Indies which began in 1942, a new kind of strict censorship was enacted by the Kenpeitai and civilian police. The European press was completely closed down, and other press was spied on and subject to controls, but the Indonesian nationalist press and politicians were given some room to publish and make speeches. European editors and journalists at ethnically mixed publications were fired, and Indonesians promoted; the Indonesian language replaced Dutch almost immediately across the entire sector. The teaching of European history was banned. Indonesians were also mobilized or forced to support the Japanese effort and many artists and intellectuals were recruited to create propaganda or art that met strict constraints. Films were also censored, including pre-approval of scripts before production.

=== War for independence (1945–49) ===
After the Japanese withdrawal, the former territory of the Dutch East Indies was divided between the Dutch and the Indonesian nationalists during the period known as the Indonesian National Revolution. During this wartime situation, the developing Indonesian state did not have the ability or desire to censor systematically, and they were very aware that Indonesians were experiencing free expression after several years of Japanese repression. The 1945 Constitution of Indonesia guaranteed freedom of expression and assembly, but theoretically the colonial-era censorship laws were still in force. The republic established the Ministry of Information and a government radio station Radio Republik Indonesia in September 1945; that same month in Yogyakarta they established a Censorship Agency limited to the city itself which aspired to control inflammatory broadcasts and publications. Meanwhile, the Dutch side (the Netherlands Indies Civil Administration) also stated their support for freedom of the press and that they did not want to return to the strict censorship of the 1930s. But during the military occupation in Dutch zones, which included the capital Jakarta, Indonesian journalists and publications were often persecuted and forced to censor their reports, especially on military actions. Some pro-republic journalists fled to rural areas with their presses rather than continue to operate on the Dutch side. Nonetheless, the pro-republican newspapers remained the dominant force even in Dutch-held areas.

The republican government also published Berita Repoeblik Indonesia (Indonesian Republic News) and encouraged its officially-sanctioned contents to be quoted and reprinted in private newspapers, and hired celebrity journalists such as Parada Harahap to build public trust in their official publications.

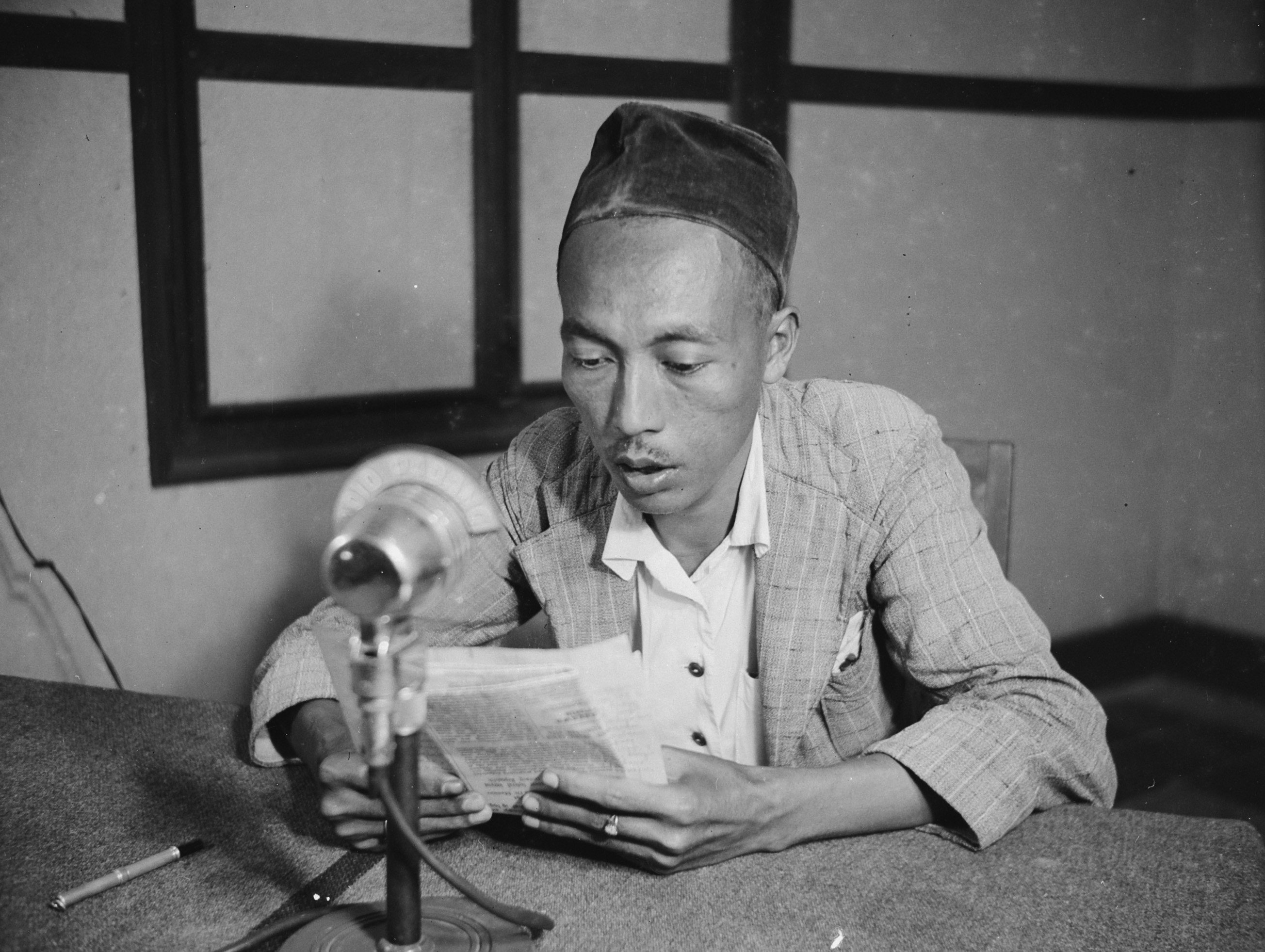
Abdul Rachman broadcasting on Radio Padang, 1948

== Liberal democracy era (1950–59) ==
Following the departure of the Dutch from most of Indonesia after the 1949 Dutch–Indonesian Round Table Conference, the Indonesian Republic began a period of Liberal democracy which initially had few forms of official censorship. The rapid turnover in governments during this period, and the general weakness of the new state also made a coherent policy of censorship impossible. There was also a general desire to avoid applying the Dutch legal regulations, which had been used aggressively against the Indonesian nationalists before the war, against the population. Nonetheless, they were occasionally applied, as in 1953 when incendiary political speeches were banned from publication under the old regulations. In August 1951 many journalists, trade unionists and left-wing politicians were also arrested without charge by the Soekiman Cabinet, although this relied on emergency powers and not censorship laws. It was only in 1954 that the 1930s press regulations were actually repealed, and were replaced by new regulations in the 1955 Penal Code which nonetheless drew heavily on their predecessors. For example, ambiguous regulations allowed journalists to be held responsible by local authorities for printing inaccurate facts which could cause public disorder. Another issue was the granting or withholding of resources and support to newspapers depending on their political loyalty; troublesome newspapers were often denied access to bank loans or printing paper. Dutch-language newspapers, of which a handful remained in the early independence era, also suffered unofficial forms of persecution and declined gradually in the first half of the 1950s.

In 1956 a new period of repression of the press and political repression began. In the fall of that year, the military issued a decree forbidding criticism of any official, or for printing anything which may confuse or agitate the population. The effect of these regulations was similar to the "Hate-sowing articles" of the late colonial era. Dutch schoolteachers began to be fired in 1956 as well. The situation for the press deteriorated in 1957 after Martial Law was declared, making it one of the worst years for censorship of the entire Sukarno era. In March 1957 the army was given expanded rights to ban newspapers and to imprison journalists or political activists. Local military commanders used this new authority very aggressively and arbitrarily; the army commander in Jakarta temporarily closed almost all of the city's daily papers in September, including Harian Rakjat, Pedoman and Bintang Timur; only four newspapers were excluded. The Dutch-language press, which had already dwindled in importance, was a major target as punishment over the West New Guinea dispute; editors were replaced or fired by government decree, some Dutch journalists who had been military veterans were deported, and editors were arrested by military police. Finally on 1 December 1957 a decree was issued completely banning Dutch-language publications; this affected all the remaining major dailies, including Dutch-owned papers like De Java-bode in Jakarta and De Preangerbode in Bandung, as well as Indonesian-owned papers De Nieuwsgier in Jakarta and De Vrije Pers in Surabaya. Because the law also affected other "foreign" languages, Chinese and English-language publications now needed a special license to publish.

== Guided Democracy era (1959–66) ==
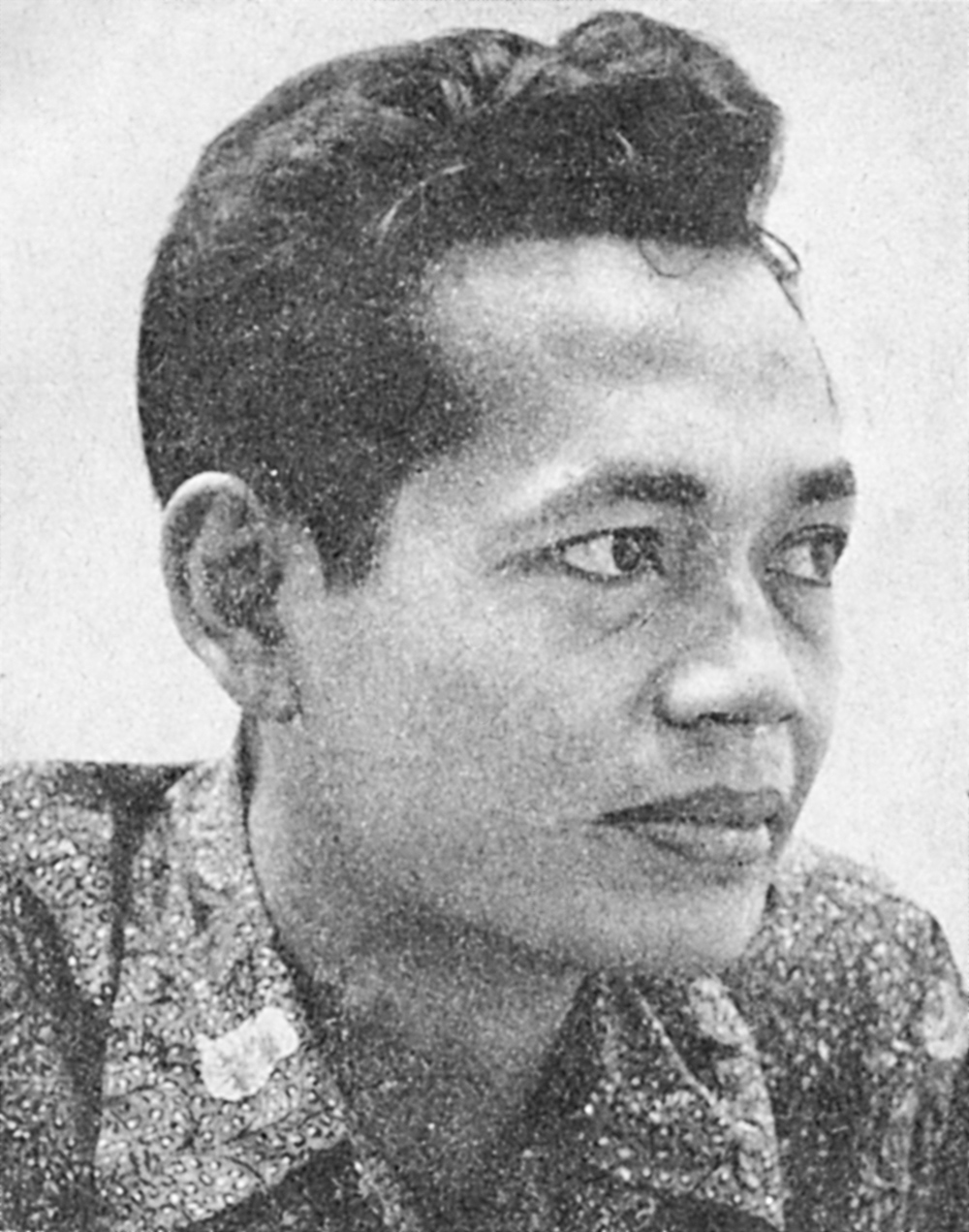
Mochtar Lubis, editor of Indonesia Raya, who was repeatedly jailed by the government

By the late 1950s, with the advent of a more centralized and undemocratic political system termed Guided Democracy, this new era of stricter censorship was enshrined in the political system. Despite this, Indonesia continued to have a vibrant press culture with dozens of newspapers and magazines representing a wide spectrum of viewpoints. In 1959 a Press-Military Contact Bureau was established with the goal of ensuring conformity among editors; and a 1960 presidential regulation banned criticism of the government without a license. Overly critical publications had their circulation or number of pages limited by decree, even if they were allowed to continue operating. The two largest opposition political parties, Masyumi Party and the Communist Party, were initially large enough to maintain their influence and even expand it; although the communist daily Harian Rakjat was regularly persecuted by military authorities and had dozens of issues pulled by censors in 1960, other communist publications rose in readership during the same period. Smaller parties such as the Socialist Party of Indonesia and affiliated newspapers such as Keng Po, Star Weekly and Indonesia Raya were hit hardest by the wave of repression; when Masyumi was banned in 1960 its publications also suffered. Other newspapers, such as Abadi and Pedoman, refused to comply with the new system of political control over the press and were shut down; others simply closed of their own accord. Books were also censored; the leftist novelist and historian Pramoedya Ananta Toer's 1960 book Hoa Kiau di Indonesia (overseas Chinese in Indonesia), which defended the Indonesian Chinese and criticized government discrimination at the height of an anti-Chinese campaign, was banned and he himself was imprisoned without charge for nine months by military authorities. Other academic works were also pressured and censored, as historians and journalists were expected to portray history in a way that matched the official ideology.

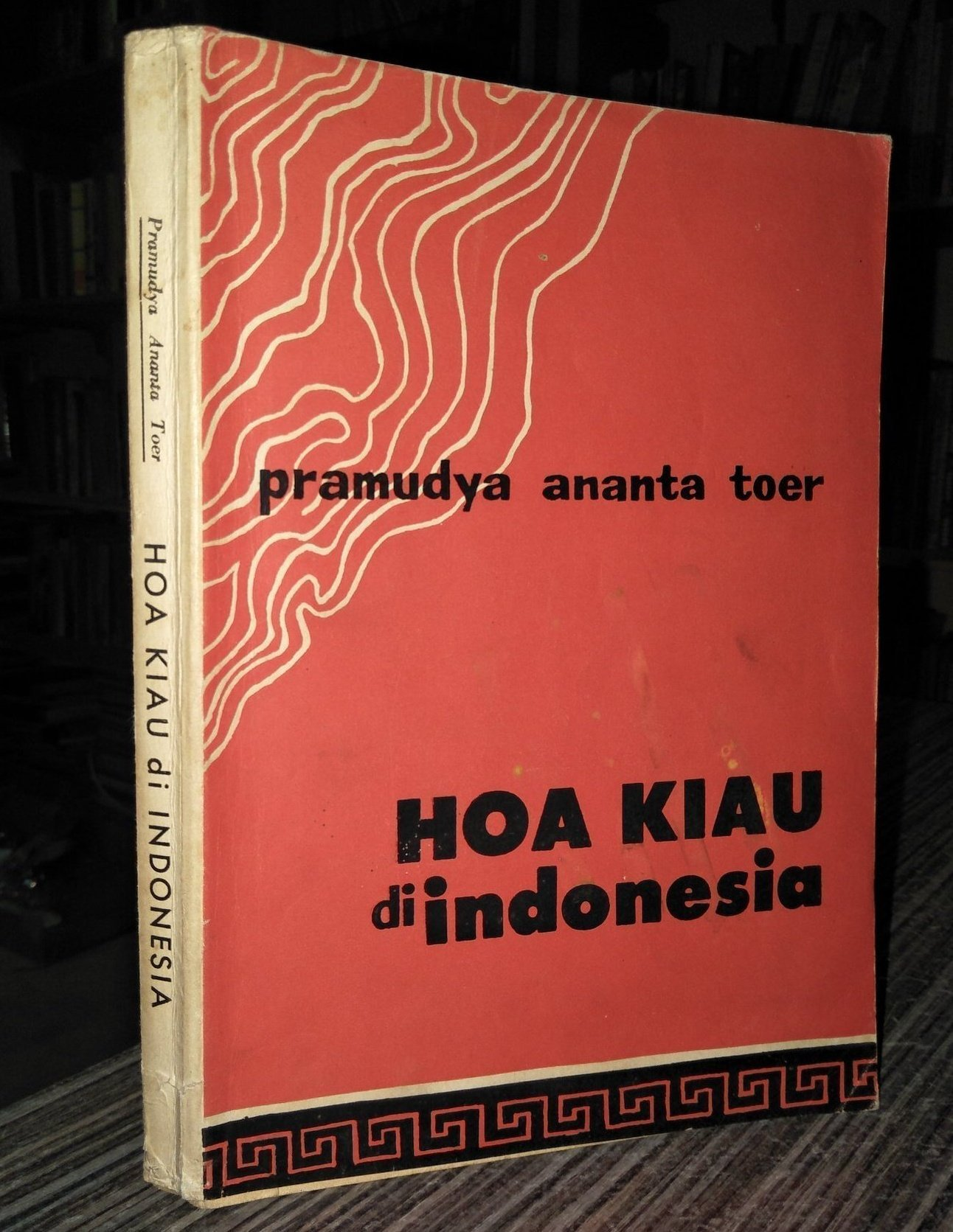
Hoa Kiau di Indonesia, which was banned by the government in 1960

New regulations continued to be introduced; a 1963 presidential decree by Sukarno (PP. No. 4/1963) also required book publishers to send copies of their book to local prosecutors within 48 hours of publication. The Attorney General was given new centralized powers to criminalize or seize printed works which were thought to disrupt public order or work against the Indonesian state. Ownership of banned materials was also covered in this decree, so that academics and writers could fear arrest for mere possession of targeted books. Resurgent anti-Western sentiment, shared by both Sukarno and his allies in the Communist Party, caused censorship and unofficial suppression of Western books, films and music as well. In early 1965, Sukarno also intervened repeatedly on behalf of the communists, closing many anti-communist newspapers and others which were affiliated with anti-communist groups. After that wave of closures the army, fearing a media landscape which was dominated by the communist press, opened new publications of its own, such as Berita Yudha, which was launched in February 1965. Kompas was founded as a magazine during this period by anti-communist Catholics.

== New Order era (1966–98) ==
The fall of Sukarno and the Transition to the New Order in 1966–67 ushered in a new period of political repression and censorship, especially against leftists, communists, or perceived enemies of the Suharto regime. During this period the trends that had begun in the late 1950s, where the press was forced to closely collaborate with the military, continued to be developed.

Following the failed 30 September Movement in 1965, the army immediately took revenge on the Communist Party and anyone remotely associated with them. In November 1965, while Sukarno was still technically in power, the Minister of Elementary Education and Culture for Technical Education banned a list of seventy books, and the army closed down more than 160 newspapers. The 1963 decree continued to be used to criminalize and censor printed works in the New Order. Any books associated with the Communist Party were soon banned, as well as anything by a list of 87 authors who were associated with the party; 31 newspapers, including the national press agency, were closed down. On the other hand, anti-communist, right-wing, Islamic, and even Liberal newspapers and writers were given more space to publish openly than they had in the Sukarno era. Nonetheless, these remaining publications heavily self-censored and continued to work closely with the military and government.

A new Basic Press Law (No. 11) passed in 1966 claimed to affirm freedom of the press, but also explicitly tied journalism to the interests of the state. Following this law, many regulations and ministerial decrees were put in place which gave the government strong powers to suppress or censor almost any printed materials it found objectionable, although the Press Council needed to be consulted before newspapers could be banned. Another 1966 law forbade the teaching of Marxism–Leninism. The state claimed to guarantee press freedom and framed closures as being about licensing; and the number of licenses issued to press organizations was limited to 289, meaning that the overall size of the press industry in the country declined to less than half of its pre-1965 size. To publish, newspapers or magazines actually had to secure two difference licenses; one from the Ministry of Information and another from the military security organization Kopkamtib. The publication of fiction and a rich cultural life continued during this period; however, novelists and writers often self-censored to fit with government regulations and ideology, or else remained quite marginal. As in the colonial era, publishers were required to send two copies of books to government censors within 48 hours of publication, and if they were found to be unfit they could be arbitrarily banned. Topics which were taboo for books or news publications included ethnicity, inter-group relations, politicized religion, the 1945 Indonesian constitution, the family of president Suharto, military activities, and many other thing which could be said to disturb social order. Bans on printed materials, which could be highly arbitrary and without judicial review, would be publicized widely to ensure they were enforced by local authorities.

By the early 1970s, the Indonesian press had recovered somewhat despite the strict control and regulations, and included a range of viewpoints including left-wing, conservative, military, religious, and apolitical popular magazines. Some events during this time, such as student demonstrations in 1973, and the Malari incident in 1974 caused new waves of censorship and repression, with licenses revoked and editors jailed; almost all of the left-wing student newspapers disappeared during this crackdown, and many journalists were blacklisted. Allegations of fraud in the 1977 Indonesian legislative election were also strictly censored, and in 1978 some newspapers including Kompas and Sinar Harapan were temporarily closed for coverage of student protests. Nonetheless, with an expanding middle class readership and developing economy, some large news organizations (such as Tempo) grew too large and respected for the government to easily close. There were no major periods of press repression in the 1980s, although some individual publications were still punished or closed for printing things the government objected to. The government also continued to be hostile to foreign or domestic scholars who researched or spoke publicly about taboo subjects; Benedict Anderson was blacklisted in the 1970s and was repeatedly expelled from Indonesia during the following decades; Audrey Kahin was also blacklisted until 1991. The academic Slametmuljana also had a book about the history of Islam in Indonesia banned by the government in 1971; because it of its thesis that Islam may have been introduced via China, it was thought to be inflammatory. Likewise Deliar Noer was blacklisted from teaching in 1974 for his historical writings, and in the 1980s a book of oral history on the 1948 and 1965 coup attempts written by Siauw Giok Tjhan was banned.

Novels published in the 1980s continued to attract the attention of censors. Pramoedya Ananta Toer's anti-colonial epic series Buru Tetralogy, starting with This Earth of Mankind (written while imprisoned in the 1970s and published in 1980), was banned by the Attorney General in 1981, although other similar novels such a Y. B. Mangunwijaya's The Weaverbirds (Burung-burung Manyar), published in 1981, was not banned. It was forbidden for Pramoedya's novels to even be reviewed or held by university libraries, and Pramoedya and his publisher were arrested and interrogated. Films were also censored; in 1973 the Japanese film Romusha was banned after pressure from the Japanese government, and in 1977 a Dutch-Indonesian film Saija dan Adinda, which was based on the novel Max Havelaar, was banned for portraying colonialism too positively. In 1982 the Australian film The Year of Living Dangerously was banned; it would not be shown in Indonesia until 2000.

The Basic Press Law was revised again in 1982, this time replacing the revolutionary language of the 1960s with new terminology focusing on stability and development. During the 1980s the press continued to be censored, often in order to protect the state and its leaders from being exposed to foreign criticism. Academic works and foreign books or textbooks continue to be banned as well, especially if they were deemed to contain criticism of the Suharto regime or other banned topics.

In the 1990s, the final decade of the New Order, the government's repressive policies around film and print materials became increasingly at odds with the expectations of the growing middle class. The government still banned academic works which contradicted official accounts or which made any mention of the communist party. One of the most dramatic examples of official censorship of the late New Order period took place in 1994, when the government pulled the licenses of Tempo, Editor, and Detik; this was the first major banning of publications since the 1970s. These closures spurred a surprisingly strong public reaction and international pressure; there were roughly 170 public protests around Indonesia over this matter. The government initially backtracked and promised to reverse the canceling of the licenses, although it did not do so once the public lost interest. Tempo journalists sued the government and won, although the ruling was overturned by the Supreme Court of Indonesia. Other publications continued to be censored occasionally; in 1995 the student newspaper Sintesa from Gadjah Mada University was shut down for printing an article about the 1965 coup attempt. In 1994 the film Schindler's List was also banned for its scenes of nudity and violence. The government was also more careful about book censorship in the second half of the 1990s; a new novel by Pramoedya Ananta Toer was allowed to be sold for several months in 1995 until the Attorney General finally banned it.

== Reform era (1998–present) ==
During the period of liberalization following the fall of the Suharto dictatorship, commonly known by its Indonesian name Reformasi, most forms of official censorship were abolished and there was a rapid expansion of new book publishing and news media. In May 1998, only two weeks after the fall of Suharto, the previous licensing system for the press was drastically simplified; from the previous limit of 289, new licenses were issued for more than 700 new media outlets over the following year. The Ministry of Information, which had been responsible for many forms of censorship, was abolished by President Abdurrahman Wahid in 1999, although it was reestablished in 2001 as the Ministry of Communication and Information Technology (or Kominfo) by President Megawati Sukarnoputri.

=== Books ===
Books, both fiction and nonfiction, saw a rapid expansion in publication following 1998 and for several years there was very little official, centralized censorship. A large number of new small presses opened in cities with vibrant university presences, including Yogyakarta, Jakarta, Bandung and Medan; the turnover in the industry was also influenced by the 1997 Asian financial crisis which had hit major publishers hard. The novels and nonfiction works of Pramoedya Ananta Toer and other left-wing writers, which had been banned for decades, were published in new editions in the early 2000s. Likewise the novels of Ahmad Tohari, which had been in print but heavily self-censored by the publisher Gramedia because of its sympathetic portrayal of communists, were re-released in their original form. A new generation of emancipated fiction writers emerged, including Ayu Utami, Dewi Lestari and Djenar Maesa Ayu. Former leftists or political prisoners who had been imprisoned during the New Order released new memoirs as well. Imported foreign books, and Indonesian translations of Western works, became more commonplace and popular. Even books about taboo topics such as Marxism were being published, although bookstores selling them were subject to local police raids in the early 2000s. Such raids were banned by the Ministry of Justice in May 2001, but regional governments or authorities continued to censor works.

During the first decade of the Reform-era, some books continued to be banned by the Attorney General's Office of Indonesia and the Deputy Attorney General for Intelligence (Jaksa Agung Muda Bidang Intelijen). These include history textbooks banned in 2004 and 2007, and a set of five books dealing with the Communist Party, the anti-Communist massacres of the 1960s, or religious minorities, in 2009. The banning of these books has been criticized for their reliance on the 1963 censorship law, which was supposed to be superseded by the Press Law No.40 of 1999.

=== Film, technology and video games ===
Unlike in the book publishing industry, films continued to be censored in the Reform era as regulated by Law No. 33/2009 on Film. Film censorship is conducted by the Film Censorship Board, which had been placed during the Prabowo Administration under the Ministry of Culture.

In 2020, the Kominfo Director General Semuel Abrijani Pangerapan and Johnny G. Plate introduced a law that requires foreign companies to register under the Electronic System Operator list which could give the government access to the citizen's personal info and threaten the company to block access from the country if the company did not register. The law was revised and passed in 2021. In July 2022, a ban was implemented for several notable websites such as PayPal, Epic Games, Steam, Origin, and Yahoo, and games such as Counter-Strike: Global Offensive and Dota 2 as they did not register under the ministry's new law. The ban was quickly lifted, however, after each company registered under the Electronic System Operator by early August 2022.

=== Internet and press freedom ===
Tempo, which had still been refused the right to publish since 1994, resumed publication in October 1998 and revised its editorial style to match the new, more open era. The number of journalists increased rapidly in the country, from an estimated five thousand in 1997 to more than fifteen thousand in 2003, with approximately 1300 news licensed news organizations. Without centralized state censorship, opponents of free expression turned to libel lawsuits and civil court to silence critical coverage. Nonetheless, previously taboo topics such as human rights abuses were now openly covered in the press. The 2002 broadcasting law did put some limits on the free speech of broadcasters, including news broadcasters; it directed them to "maintain and enhance the morality and religious values and national identity" and required television stations to obtain certificates from censors and adhere to their rules.

The internet is also widely and arbitrarily censored in Indonesia; the Kominfo, which is responsible for it, bans or shuts down websites and services with no due process if they are deemed to be illegal, provocative, or even critical of the government. Reform-era news organizations sometimes self-censor, especially when the topic may impact the business interests of the owner, or when it relates to sensitive political topics such as the independence movement in Papua. An example of this type of self-censorship occurred during the 2025 protests; on August 30 TikTok parent company ByteDance temporarily disabled livestreaming functions on the pretext that violence was taking place in protests.

In 2026, Indonesian authorities threatened to block access to Wikipedia during disputes concerning online content regulation and government registration requirements.

=== Protests and freedom of expression ===
On 10 June 2020, Human Rights Watch urged the Indonesian authorities to drop all charges against seven Papuan activists and students, who are on trial for their involvement in anti-racism protests last year in August. On 2 December 2019, four students along with the other 50 students, peacefully protested against the human rights abuses in Papua and West Papua, asking the Indonesian government to release the Papuan political prisoners. A civil lawsuit was filed against 4 student activists following their expulsion from their university. On 13 July 2020, the police charged one of the four students with "treason" and "public provocation." Human Rights Watch urged the Indonesia's Khairun University to reinstate the four students who were expelled and support academic freedom and free expression.

On 6 December 2022, the People's Representative Council unanimously passed a new criminal code that placed heavy restrictions on freedom of speech and the right to protest, a move that was widely condemned by activists and human rights organizations. Before it was passed, the Press Council of Indonesia attempted to convince President Joko Widodo to halt it's enactment. The law reintroduced a ban against insulting the president, vice president, Indonesian flag, government institutions, or Pancasila (the official state ideology of the country). It instituted requirements that protesters receive permission to protest from the police, or else face imprisonment for up to 6 months. It also introduced major restrictions to abortion rights and partially criminalized consensual sex outside of marriage.
