= Yap Thiam Hien =

Indonesian lawyer and rights advocate

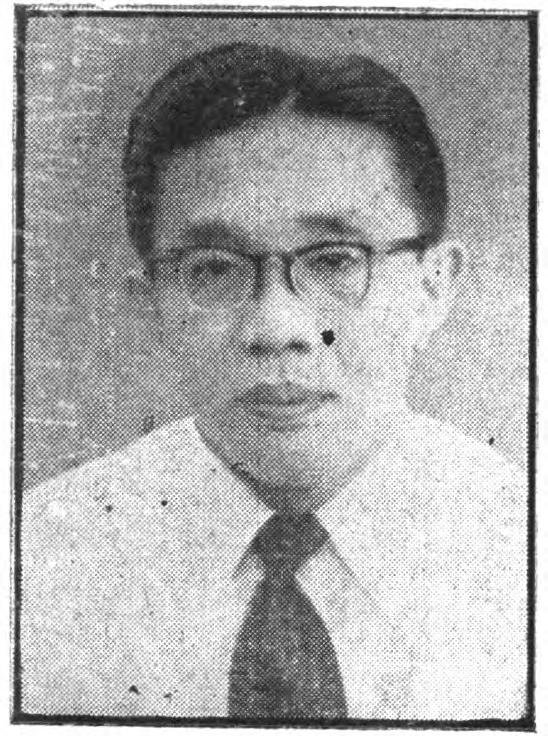
- Portrait, c. 1955
- Born: 25 May 1913; Kutaraja, Aceh, Dutch East Indies
- Died: 25 April 1989 (aged 75); Brussels, Belgium
- Education: Leiden University
- Occupation: Human rights lawyer
- Political party: Baperki (1954–1966)
- Spouse: Tan Gien Khing Nio
- Children: 2

Chinese name
- Traditional Chinese: 葉添興
- Simplified Chinese: 叶添兴
- Hanyu Pinyin: Yè Tiānxìng
- Romanization: Ya̍p Thiâmhîn

John Yap Thiam Hien (25 May 1913 – 25 April 1989) was an Indonesian human rights lawyer.

== Life ==
Born in Kutaraja, Aceh, Dutch East Indies, his father was Yap Sin Eng and his mother was Hwan Tjing Nio. Yap's family, living in genteel but reduced circumstances, was part of the Cabang Atas or the local Chinese gentry; through his father, Yap was a great-grandson of Yap A Sin, Luitenant der Chinezen of Kutaraja from 1901 until 1922, a high-ranking position in the colonial civil bureaucracy.

Of Chinese Indonesian heritage, Yap was an advocate for human rights. He believed achieving minority rights needed to be part of the larger struggle for the rights of all people. Despite his Cabang Atas background, he turned down an offer to join the influential political party Chung Hwa Hui due to his skepticism of the latter's elitist outlook.

== Career ==
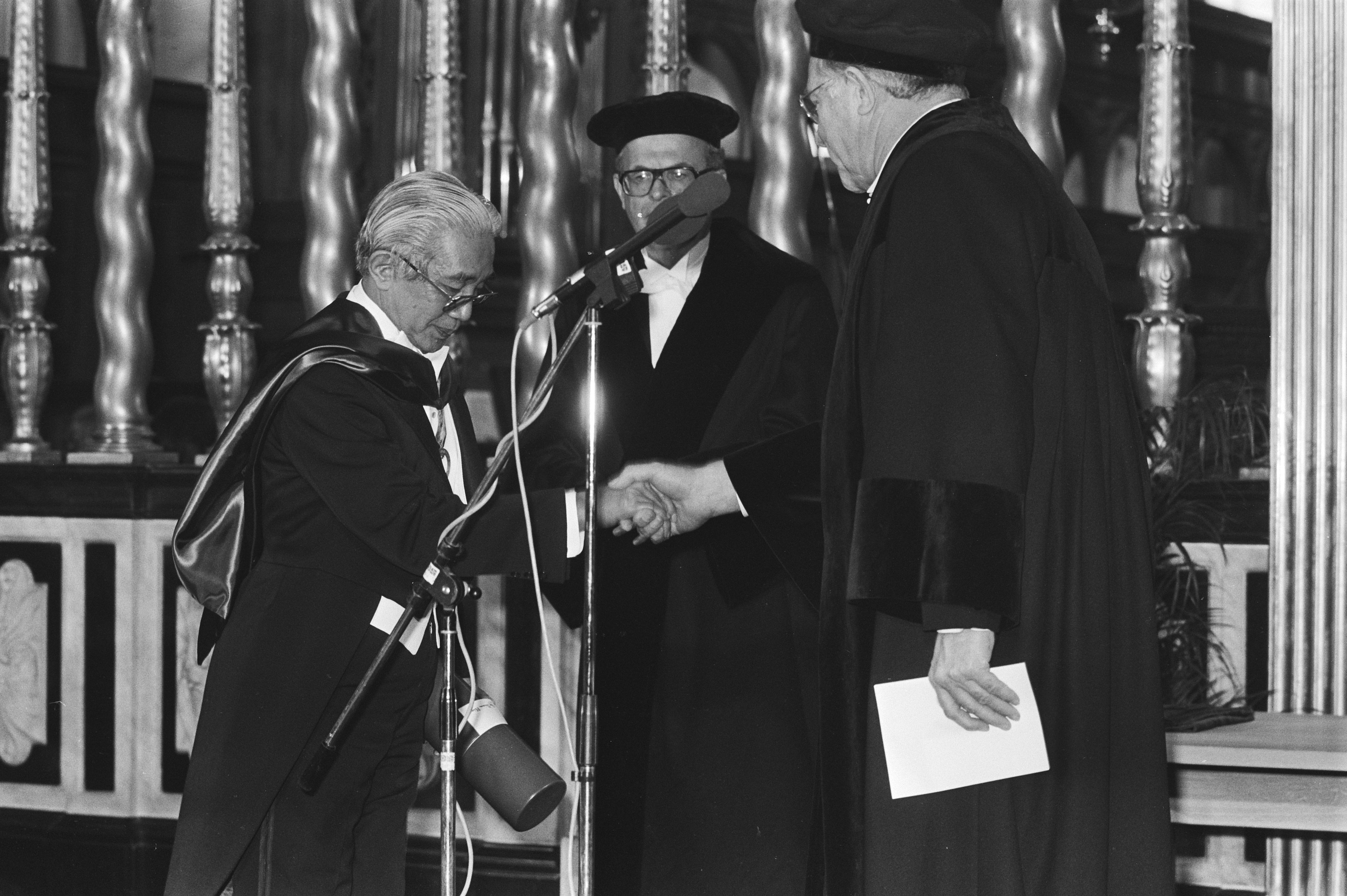
Yap Thiam Hien receiving an award during dies natalis of Vrije Universiteit Amsterdam, 1980

Yap moved often when he was young in pursuit his studies. He obtained the Meester der Rechten degree from the Faculty of Law, Leiden University in the Netherlands in 1947. He returned to Indonesia and started his career as a lawyer in Jakarta. He opened a law firm together with John Karwin in 1950, and later joined the firm of Lie Hwee Yoe. He opened his own law firm in 1970. Since then, he has fought for human rights and for justice and equality for ethnic minorities and the poor. He was one of the founding members of PERADIN (Persatuan Advokat Indonesia) and served as the leader.

Together with Adnan Buyung Nasution, Mochtar Lubis, P.K. Ojong, Victor D. Sibarani, Albert Hasibuan, Bambang Widjojanto, Johannes Cornelis Princen and other notable human rights activists and lawyers, Yap was one of the founders of Yayasan Lembaga Bantuan Hukum Indonesia (YLBHI), formerly known as Lembaga Bantuan Hukum (LBH), which was a legal aid society to help the poor.

In order to fight discriminative action toward Indonesian Chinese, in 1954 Yap was an early member of BAPERKI Badan Permusjawaratan Kewarganegaraan Indonesia, an organization originally dedicated to obtaining citizenship for ethnic Chinese. After the 1965 fall of the Sukarno regime, BAPERKI was accused of having links with the Indonesian Communist Party (PKI) and was banned by the new Suharto regime.

== Death and legacy ==
While attending the International NGO Forum on Indonesian Development conference in Brussels, Yap suffered from internal bleeding and was treated at St. Augustin Hospital for two days before he died on April 25, 1989.

The Yap Thiam Hien Award is a human rights award named after him to commemorate his steadfastness and commitment. The Yap Thiam Hien Award Program has been managed by the Human Rights Study Center Foundation (Yayasan Pusat Studi Hak Asasi Manusia or YAPUSHAM) since 1992.
