= Poncke Princen =

Indonesian independence fighter (1925–2002)

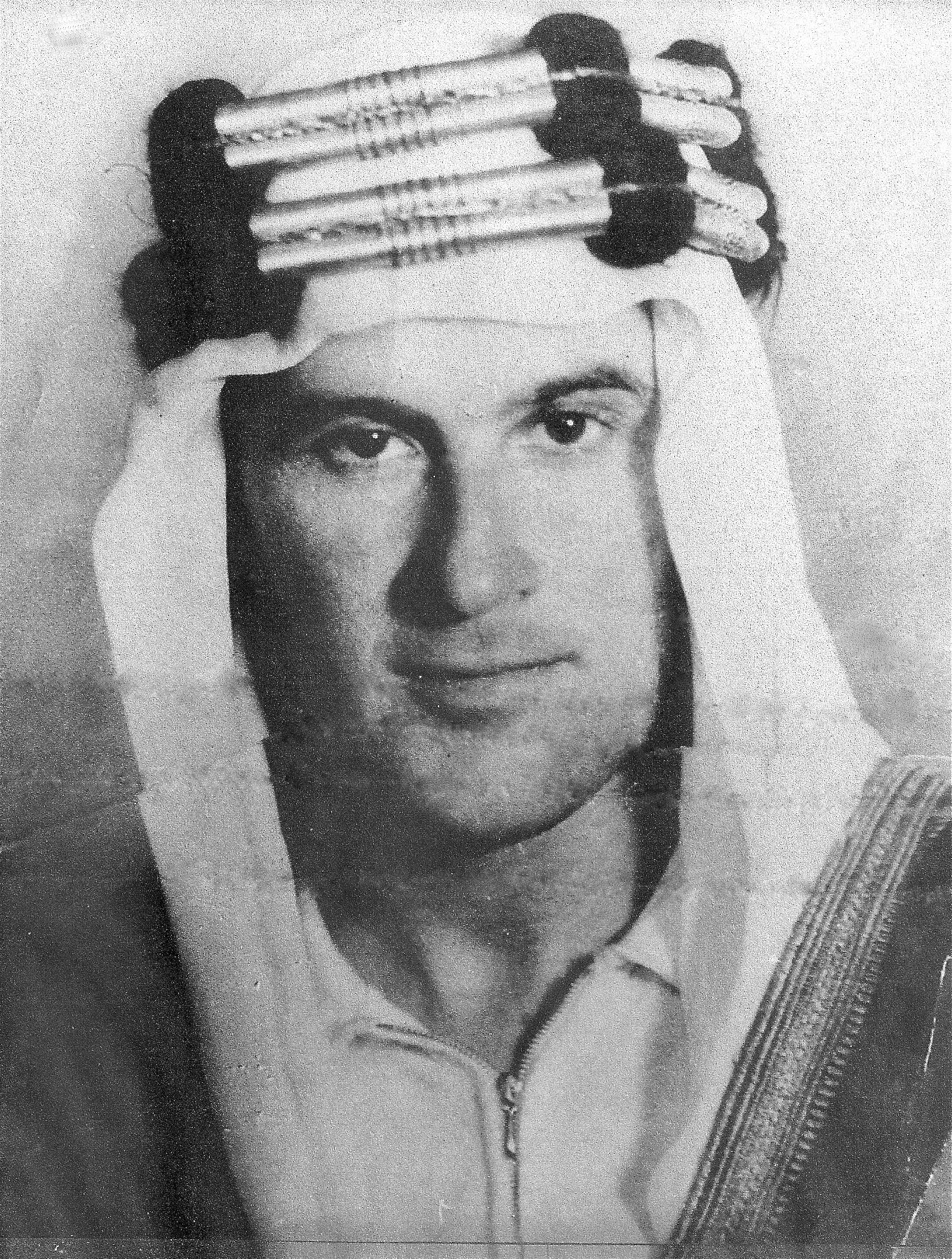
- Born: Johannes Cornelis Princen; 21 November 1925; The Hague, Netherlands
- Died: 2 February 2002 (aged 76); Jakarta, Indonesia

Johannes Cornelis Princen (21 November 1925 – 2 February 2002), also known as Poncke Princen, was a Dutch anti-Nazi fighter and activist. In 1948, he deserted the Dutch military, and joined the Indonesian independence guerrillas in the Dutch Indies.

For his anti-Nazi activities, he was imprisoned in several Nazi prisons and camps in the Netherlands and Germany. After defecting to the Indonesian guerrillas who opposed Dutch rule, he lived the rest of his life in Indonesia, where he became a human rights activist and political dissident. Owing to his activism, he spent time in detention in Indonesia.

== Early life ==
Princen was born in The Hague, Netherlands to socialist parents. His great-grandfather had been a deserter from military service and had long been chased by the authorities.

Despite his upbringing, Princen took interest in Catholicism, influenced by his grandmother, Theresia Princen-Van der Lee. In 1939, he entered the Holy Ghost Seminary at Weert – where he was followed by his younger brother Kees Princen, with whom he was to maintain correspondence throughout his life. In 1940, while he was at the seminary, Nazi Germany invaded and occupied the Netherlands.

In 1942, at age 17, he was accepted as an economic counselor at Teppemaand Vargroup Groothandel voor Chemische Producten, a chemical company in The Hague. Eventually, he quit the job to take up arms against the Nazi occupation of the Netherlands.

== Nazi imprisonment and liberation ==
In 1943, Princen was arrested by the German occupation authorities in Maastricht while trying to travel to Spain. He intended to travel to Britain from Spain and enlist in an Allied army fighting the Nazis. He was convicted by the occupation authorities of "attempting to aid the enemy" and in early 1944 was sent to the notorious Vught Camp.

On June 6, 1944, he was transferred to the Kriegswehrmachtgefängnis (Wehrmacht military prison) at Utrecht. While there, he entertained fellow prisoners by reading from a favorite book, Pastoor Poncke ("Pastor Poncke") by Jan Eekhout. This led to his nickname of "Poncke", which he was to keep for the rest of his life.

He was transferred to the prison camp at Amersfoort and from there to Beckum, Germany. Before being liberated by the arrival of Allied forces, he passed through seven Nazi prisons and camps.

After being freed from Nazi imprisonment, Princen joined the Stoottroepen Regiment Brabant (Brabant Stormtroop Regiment), based in the southern Dutch province of North Brabant.

In 1945, he worked for the newly founded Bureau voor Nationale Veiligheid (Bureau of National Security nl:Bureau Nationale Veiligheid), forerunner of the Dutch Security Service – mainly involved in hunting down collaborators and war criminals, but also surveilling natives of the Dutch Indies who lived in the Netherlands, who were sympathetic with the rebellion against Dutch rule that was spreading in their homeland.

== Colonial service ==
In March 1946, Princen was called up to join the ranks of the Royal Netherlands Army and take part in what Dutch histories still call 'Police Actions' (politionele acties) but which became better known as the Indonesian National Revolution.

Reluctant to take part in the war, Princen fled to France – but upon hearing that his mother was ill, came back and was arrested by the Marechaussee and detained at Schoonhoven. On December 28, 1946, he was put on board the troop ship Sloterdijk. Also aboard the Sloterdijk was the Communist Piet van Staveren, likewise a reluctant conscript who would eventually desert and join the Indonesian rebels. Both of them did meet during the trip and sharing their anti-colonial ideas.

When he arrived in the Indies, Princen was charged with desertion. On 22 October 1947, he was sentenced to twelve months' imprisonment for desertion, but he was returned to active service after four months at the Tjisaroea Prison Camp, the remainder of his sentence being suspended. He was increasingly unhappy with the haughty and contemptuous attitude of fellow soldiers to the local population, and he was present at some violent incidents which greatly increased his disaffection. As he many years later explained, "An adolescence under Nazi rule and two years in German imprisonment has directed my life and made me fight against cruelty. I thought the Indonesians were right. I thought they should be the ones to decide their own future. (...) I was disgusted with the Dutch killing people I admired".

In January 1948, the United Nations brokered a fragile cease-fire, but almost immediately both sides violated the truce in multiple incidents and the Dutch forces made preparations for a new operation against the rebel forces. It was at this time, while being on leave at Sukabumi, that Princen crossed the Line of Demarcation into rebel-held territory, and via Semarang reached Yogyakarta, the provisional capital of the self-proclaimed Indonesian Republic – where the suspicious Indonesian nationalists threw him into prison.

== As an Indonesian guerrilla ==
In December 1948, the Dutch army launched Operation Kraai (Dutch for "Crow"), captured Yogyakarta, and imprisoned Sukarno and other most nationalist leaders. During the assault upon the provisional capital, the nationalist rebels released Princen from their prison and gave him the chance to enlist in the Tentara Nasional Indonesia (TNI, Indonesian Republican Forces). When he joined them, the pro-independence forces' fortunes seemed at their nadir, with their political leadership captured and most of the territory of Indonesia under a re-established Dutch military rule. They conducted an intensive guerrilla campaign and gained considerable international sympathy and support.

Princen was fully committed to his new cause, seeing front-line service under Kemal Idris and taking part in the fighting retreat of the Siliwangi Division under then-Colonel A. H. Nasution, from Central Java to "guerrilla cantons" established in West Java – an action which came to be known as the Long March Siliwangi (derived from the famed Long March of Mao Zedong's Chinese Communist Party). He was appointed staff officer in the Second Brigade of Grup Purwakarta, active in the environs of the city of Purwakarta.

On one occasion in the beginning of August 1949, Dutch troops shot Princen's wife Odah, with Princen narrowly avoiding being killed. When asked in a press interview many years later "Did you actually shoot at Dutch soldiers? Did you kill some of them?" he answered forthrightly "Yes, I did."

Princen became famous (or notorious, according to point of view). In a struggle decided as much in the international public opinion and diplomatic forums as in the field, the presence of an articulate ex-Dutch soldier with an anti-Nazi past in the rebel ranks had a political and propaganda significance. Princen's act aroused bitter hostility against him from the Netherlands. Some accused him of having allowed himself to be used as bait to draw Dutch soldiers into an ambush which led to a high number of KNIL (Koninklijk Nederlands Indisch Leger - Royal Netherlands East Indies Army) fatalities. A Dutch court martial sentenced him to death in absentia, and when the Dutch finally decided to evacuate Indonesia, they made a demand for his extradition. Sukarno, the first president of Indonesia, did not agree. Instead, on October 5, 1949, he awarded Princen the Guerilla Star, the highest decoration of Indonesia.

Princen's career as a rebel and dissident continued. He was imprisoned repeatedly, both by Sukarno and by Sukarno's rival and successor Suharto, spending a total of eight and a half years in prison. The decoration he received from Sukarno – a small five-pointed bronze star on which were etched the words "Pahlawan Gerilja" (Guerrilla Hero), and which Princen conspicuously displayed until the end of his days – was to give him at least some protection from the most harsh forms of repression to which successive Indonesian regimes resorted against many other dissidents and political opponents.

== As dissident parliamentarian, political prisoner ==
After the war Princen married again – this time to a Dutch woman named Janneke Marckmann (until 1971) and later to Sri Mulyati, who was to remain his companion until his death. He had four children: Ratnawati, Iwan Hamid, Nicolaas and Wilanda.

His desire to "immerse himself in Indonesia" was manifested in a conversion to Islam, the predominant religion in Indonesia. Asked why he had changed his religion, he later explained to a visitor: "I wanted to feel a part of what everyone else was doing". In later life, his name was on some formal occasions preceded by the Muslim honorific Hajji, usually bestowed upon those who had gone on pilgrimage to Mecca.

Between 1950 and 1953 Princen was an official at the Indonesian Immigration Office. In 1956 he became a Member of the Indonesian Parliament on behalf of the League of Upholders of Indonesian Independence (IPKI), and was considered a representative of the foreign minority in Indonesia. As a parliamentarian he repeatedly posed questions to the Sukarno Government, on such issues as the unequal division of national resources and income between the central island of Java and the outlying islands. He was apparently one of the "obstructing parliamentarians" whom Sukarno found annoying and whose activity was among the factors which led the President to replace the Western-type parliamentary system with "guided democracy" in 1959.

Princen's outspoken criticism caused him to be arrested and imprisoned in 1957–58. He spent Sukarno's final years, characterized by increasingly violent power struggles in Indonesia, again serving a prison term 1962–66.

== Human rights activism ==
Having come to strongly oppose Sukarno, Princen initially placed some hopes in Suharto, who overthrew him in the Transition to the New Order following the 1965 attempted coup d'état of the 30 September Movement and whose coming to power had the incidental effect of getting Princen released from prison after four years. The Suharto regime proved both extremely brutal and highly corrupt: "My opinion of Mr. Suharto changed at the moment he started gathering as much money as he could for himself."

In the late 1960s, Princen was a correspondent for Netherlands Radio and several Dutch newspapers. This was directly connected with his work as a human rights activist, in which he was to spend most of his time and energy for the remainder of his life. In 1966 Princen founded and headed Lembaga Pembela Hak-Hak Azasi Manusia (Indonesian Institute for the Defense of Human Rights). It was the first human rights organization in Indonesia, and which handled many high-profile cases during the years of the Suharto dictatorship and provide a reliable alternate source of news to Western journalists in Jakarta. Among the earlier campaigns which Princen conducted was on behalf of the left-wing writer Pramoedya Ananta Toer, imprisoned and tortured by the Suharto regime. At the end of 1969 he published, jointly with the journalist Jopie Lasut, an extensive report on the mass murder of Communist sympathizers at Purwodadi in Middle Java – for which Princen and Lasut were arrested and interrogated.

This was followed in the early 1970s by Princen's prominent role in creating a larger organization, the Indonesian Legal Aid Institute (LBHI), where he met with many other human rights figures including Adnan Buyung Nasution, Frans Winarta, Besar Mertokusumo, Yap Thiam Hien, Victor D. Sibarani, Mochtar Lubis, Albert Hasibuan and members of the younger generation of activists.

The eulogy published after his death by the Indonesian oppositional news and commentary website Laksamana. Net noted that

Princen's work as a lawyer never earned him much in the way of material wealth. Unlike other prominent human rights lawyers whose careers benefited from their high profile on the human rights front, Princen remained a figure whose only interest was in defending the rights of the small. Visitors to his succession of small offices in the early '90s remember calling on him to find themselves welcomed by Princen resting in his underwear, and his close friends recall that it was seldom that they were able to leave before parting with a contribution to help pay his driver or his phone bill.

=== Prisoner again, labor advocate, political reformer ===
As under Sukarno, Princen was jailed several times under Suharto – mainly on charges of organizing illegal political protests. In January 1974, the visit of the Japanese Prime Minister Tanaka Kakuei led to riots in Jakarta. Ostensibly fuelled by resentment of Japanese exploitation of Indonesia's economy, and to start with possibly encouraged tacitly by some Army commanders, this so-called "Malari Affair" escalated and came to express repressed resentment about the growing gap between rich and poor in Indonesian society and the bureaucratic capitalists connected with the regime. Involved as an outspoken human rights activist, Princen was imprisoned, where he spent the next two years (1974–1976).

In early 1990 Princen had a major role in founding the Merdeka Labor Union (Serikat Buruh Merdeka – "Merdeka" means "Independence") – together with Dita Indah Sari, an Indonesian labor activist and Amnesty International Prisoner of Conscience. He conducted extensive correspondence with the International Labour Organization (ILO) regarding the conditions of Indonesian workers. Max White, Princen's friend and coworker, stated that "Poncke believed that 'Labor rights are human rights', he saw no distinction". In the early 1990s, he was a founding member of the Petition of Fifty, a movement for democratic reform which included conservative military figures who had fallen out with Suharto and which for the first time in decades raised a real challenge to his rule. Along with other members of the group including Ali Sadikin and Hoegeng, Princen again found himself persona non-grata with the regime, although he joked to his visitors that by that time he was "too old to put in jail again".

In 1992 he won the Yap Thiam Hien Human Rights Award – named for the Chinese Indonesian lawyer Yap Thiam Hien, a fellow human rights activist.

In 1996 he was involved in protests against Suharto's crackdown on the Indonesian Democratic Party (PRD). Visiting delegations of international human rights organizations at the time found him "a source of accurate information about those who were attacked at the PRD headquarters".

Much of his time in the following years was spent in writing open letters to President Suharto, on such issues as demanding the abolition of extrajudicial bodies, asking for answers about "disappearances" in East Timor (and in the capital Jakarta itself), and affirming that political change needed to take place before the Indonesian economy could recover. His once-isolated legal aid organization had become part of a large and growing network of NGOs working for political and social change.

He became known as "the man in the wheelchair at political rallies, who is rarely absent from a courtroom during political trials, and at mention of whose name students around the country were smiling with admiration.

== Princen and East Timor ==
In 1994 Princen flew to Geneva to testify before the United Nations Commission on Human Rights about the use of torture by Indonesian forces in East Timor and Aceh.

José Amorim Dias, a later senior member of the East Timor Foreign Service gave the following reminiscence:

Princen had some contact with the Timorese leader Xanana Gusmão (later president of independent East Timor) when Gusmão was leading the guerilla struggle in East Timor's mountains. After Gusmão's capture by Indonesian forces in 1992 and his transfer to a Jakarta Prison, the two corresponded and developed a friendship, though being able to have a face-to-face meeting only after Reformasi movement gained force in 1998.

== Attitudes to Princen in the Netherlands ==
Though branded a traitor, Princen was not completely cut off from the Netherlands. The death sentence passed on him in absentia was no longer in force, but he was considered to be banned from entering the Netherlands, having forfeited his Dutch citizenship and the right to visit. By one account, he did briefly and unobtrusively visit the Netherlands in the 1970s, while in Europe on a human rights mission. By other accounts, he met with family members just across the German border, and on a later date a TV crew took footage of him standing over the border itself, one foot extended on to Dutch soil.

Throughout the years Princen maintained correspondence with his younger brother Kees, as well as with his mother, who in the 1940s had tried to intercede for him with the Dutch military authorities – a correspondence eventually deposited, together with many of his other papers, at the Amsterdam-based International Institute of Social History (IISH).

He was a valued reporter for various Dutch communications media. Some Dutch politicians are reported to have tacitly asked him for information on the East Timor situation, on which he had detailed information not available elsewhere.

Interest and controversy over "The Poncke Princen Affair" were re-ignited in the Netherlands by the 1989 publication of Princen's autobiographical book Poncke Princen: Een kwestie van kiezen ("Poncke Princen, a Matter of Choice"), which had been narrated to Joyce van Fenema.

Dutch left-wing activists defended Princen strongly, and asserted that his continuing rejection was an indication of the country's refusing to come to terms with its dark colonial heritage.

It was the associations of Dutch veterans who had fought in the Indies who remained to the last the most intransigent in their hatred of "Princen The Traitor", undiminished by the passage of half a century. They voiced a vociferous protest whenever the possibility of his visiting the Netherlands was mooted.

In 1994, then Dutch Foreign Minister Hans van Mierlo finally overruled the officials at the Dutch Embassy in Jakarta and personally authorised the issuing of a visa to Princen "on humanitarian grounds" – on condition (which was kept) that he maintain "a low profile" during his visit to the Netherlands and devote it mainly to meeting family members who he had not seen for many decades.. This visit took place at nearly the last moment when Princen's fast-failing health could still stand the long trip. A planned second visit in 1998, which again aroused protests by war veterans, was prevented by his stroke that year.

After Princen's death in 2002 did a Dutch cabinet minister, Jan Pronk, pay a cautious tribute to him. "Poncke Princen was no hero, martyr or saint, but first and foremost a human rights activist," the minister told Radio Netherlands

In February 2009 the documentary The White Guerrilla made by the Dutch research-journalist Bart Nijpels appeared on Dutch television (Katholieke Radio Omroep), reconstructing his life and giving an impartial opinion about his political choices. The documentary was received positively in general by the Dutch public.

== Deteriorating health and final years ==
In March 1998, the 73-year-old Princen – on a wheelchair and undergoing what was described as "mutilating surgery" for his skin cancer – was among some 150 activists who openly violated a ban on political protests in the capital Jakarta, demonstrating against the undemocratic re-election of Suharto and defying the police to arrest them. As it turned out, that was a last effort in the long struggle, and Suharto fell from power two months later. Later in the same year Princen suffered the first in a series of near-fatal strokes and remained bedridden, tended by his daughter Wilanda Princen, for his remaining years. Yet "his luminous spirit shone through his crippled wreck of a body, and he continued his work as before", as Australian journalist Jill Jolliffe who knew him well put it.

On 22 February 2002, Princen suffered his final stroke and died at the age of 76, in his home on Jl. Arjuna III No. 24 in Pisangan Baru, Utan Kayu Selatan in East Jakarta. He is survived by his wife, Sri Mulyati, and four children – two sons and two daughters (some of them residing in the Netherlands).

Before his death, Princen had specifically requested that he be buried alongside ordinary people in the public cemetery at Pondok Kelapa in East Jakarta, and renounced the place in the Heroes' Cemetery at Kalibata to which he was entitled by the Guerrilla Star which Sukarno gave him. Many friends from the years of his struggle against the excesses of successive Indonesian governments attended his funeral – "from the movements of 1945 [Indonesian Independence struggle], 1966 [Fall of Sukarno] and 1974 [Malari Affair]". There were noted activists and human rights lawyers such as Luhut Pangaribuan, Muchtar Pakpahan, Hariman Siregar, Jopy Lasut and Gurmilang Kartasasmita.

His American friend Max White remarked: "When I learned who was at the memorial service, and at the mosque and cemetery, I was struck by how wide a swath of Indonesia mourned him: from former 'tapols' [political prisoners] to members of the government and military". "We will miss him deeply ... a person of such fine quality, rich life experience and persistence in defending his belief in human rights," said Munir, Princen's young colleague at the Commission for Missing Persons and Victims and Violence (Kontras).

He was also mourned in the East Timorese capital Dili, where Xanana Gusmão – soon to be inaugurated president – said that he was deeply saddened by Princen's death: "He was my friend, and he encouraged us in our struggle. East Timor owes a lot to him." Jose Amorim Diaz added: "He was a great friend, a friend who gave us courage and inspiration. A friend who taught us moderation, tolerance and dialogue. Above all, a friend who shared our pain and grief.(...) With immense sadness we bow our heads to this noble man who has devoted his entire life for the cause of Human Rights, Democracy and Peace."

== Princen archives in Amsterdam ==
Hersri Setiawan – Indonesian poet, left-wing activist and former political prisoner, who knew Princen and who presently resides in the Netherlands – collected many Indonesian testimonies and documents for the Amsterdam-based International Institute of Social History.

Among many other Indonesian collections, Poncke Princen's archives were deposited in the institute in 1998, the year when a stroke left him bedridden for his remaining years. They include:

- Correspondence with Kees Princen 1989–96 and with other family members 1944–73
- Diary 1947
- Personal documents 1961, 1963, 1990s
- Letters and other documents on his 70th birthday 1995
- Biographical documents, including reports and notes 1987–92
- Files on his support of the opposition in East Timor 1982–93
- On the activities of the LPHAM 1987–90
- On his trade union activities, including correspondence with the ILO 1990–95
- On politics and political parties in Indonesia 1991–96
- Files concerning Indonesian political prisoners and ex-tapols 1993
- Documents regarding the death of Poncke Princen 2002

Also included are manuscripts and academic papers, such as :

- `Waarom kreeg J.C. `Poncke' Princen geen visum?, of De last van het koloniaal verleden' (Why did J.C. `Poncke' Princen get no visa?, or the burden of the colonial past) by Kaj Hofman, 1994.
- "De affaire-Poncke Princen" (The Poncke Princen Affair) by Julika Vermolen, 1993.
- "Chronologisch overzicht van het bezoek van Poncke Princen aan Nederland" (Chronological overview of Poncke Princen's visit to the Netherlands) made by Jan de Vletter, December 1994.
- "De verwerking van de politionele acties" (Working out the politionele acties) by Job Spierings, Martijn Gunther Moor and Thomas Dirkmaat, 1995.
- "Poncke Princen, een gemoedelijke radicaal in Indonesie" (Poncke Princen, a good-mooded radical in Indonesia) by Kees Snoek.
- The unpublished manuscript of a novel about Poncke Princen by Hannah Rambe.

== See also ==
- History of Indonesia
- Human rights in Indonesia
- Indonesian National Revolution
- Police Actions (Indonesia)
- Royal Netherlands East Indies Army
