= Kemal Idris =

Indonesian general

- Born: 10 February 1923; Singaraja, Bali, Dutch East Indies
- Died: 28 July 2010 (aged 87); Jakarta, Indonesia
- Spouse: Ny. Herwinoer Bandriani Singgih
- Children: 3
- Military career
- Allegiance: Indonesia
- Branch: Indonesian Army
- Service years: 1942–1972
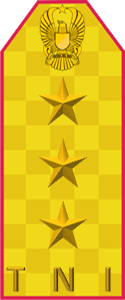
- Rank: Lieutenant General
- Unit: Infantry
- Conflicts: Indonesian National Revolution; March Offensive

Ahmed Kemal Idris (10 February 1923 – 28 July 2010) was a prominent Indonesian Army general during the 1950s and 1960s. He was an Indonesian guerrilla leader during the Indonesian National Revolution, who, in 1949, continued resistance to the Dutch forces after they occupied Yogyakarta.

Poncke Princen, the Dutch soldier who went over to the guerrillas, served under Idris's command.

Idris participated in the 17 October 1952 affair in which a group of Indonesian Army officers staged a failed coup attempt that would have forced the dissolution of the People's Representative Council (DPR, the parliament) and put President Sukarno as the supreme leader of Indonesia. Due to his actions, Idris failed to receive any significant promotion within the Army for 13 years.

In 1965–1966, Idris was chief of staff of the Strategic Reserve Command (KOSTRAD) and had an important role in the overthrow of Sukarno and the rise of General Suharto to power.

Nevertheless, by 1980 Idris had a falling-out with Suharto. He was part of a group of senior Indonesian retired generals and politicians to signed a petition highlighting their concerns against Suharto's increasing authoritarian rule. This group was later known as the Petisi 50 group, highlighting the number of its signatories.

As a result of his involvement with Petisi 50, Idris and his colleagues were sidelined and isolated by the Suharto government. Nevertheless, he set up a waste collection company in Jakarta, earning him the nickname of jenderal sampah ("waste general").

Idris died in Jakarta on 28 July 2010, due to complications from pneumonia.

== Honour ==
=== Foreign honour ===
- Malaysia:
  - Honorary Commander of the Order of Loyalty to the Crown of Malaysia (P.S.M.) - Tan Sri (1972)
