= Res Publica University =

University in Jakarta, Indonesia (1960–65)

Res Publica University (Indonesian: Universitas Res Publica, URICA) was a short-lived Indonesian university founded in Jakarta in 1960. It was sponsored by the group Baperki (Badan Permusjawaratan Kewarganegaraan Indonesia), an organization mainly of Indonesian citizens of Chinese descent including members of the Indonesian Communist Party (PKI). The university was established in response to ethnic quotas on university enrollment implemented in the 1950s. After a coup attempt in Indonesia, the Res Publica campus was attacked by anti-communists in 1965. Students barricaded themselves in the college of technology building, which was burned down by the attackers along with the rest of the campus. A new private HEI, Trisakti, was established on the site and many of the former students are barred from entry due to alleged Communist ties.

== See also ==
- Chinese Indonesians
