= Jan Eekhout =

Dutch writer, poet and translator

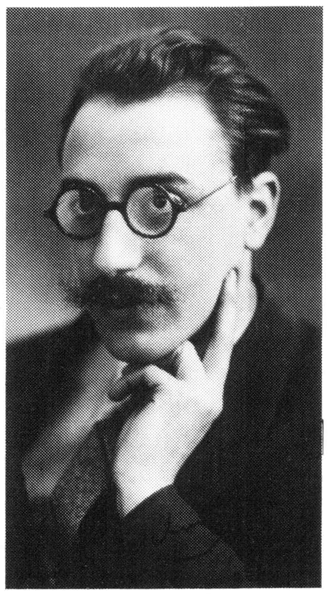
- Eekhout (1930)
- Born: 10 January 1900; Sluis, The Netherlands
- Died: 6 March 1978 (aged 78); Amsterdam
- Occupations: Writer and translator
- Writing career
- Language: Dutch
- Notable work: Pastoor Poncke

Jan Henrik Eekhout (born 10 January 1900 in Sluis - died 6 March 1978 in Amsterdam) was a Dutch writer, poet and translator, particularly known as the author of the novel Pastoor Poncke ("Pastor Poncke"). During the Second World War Eekhout was a staunch Nazi. However, the Dutch resistance fighter Jan "Poncke" Princen gained his nickname by reading aloud from this book to fellow-prisoners in a Nazi prison during World War II.
