= Gramedia =

PT Gramedia Asri Media
- Gramedia Logo (2015 – Now)

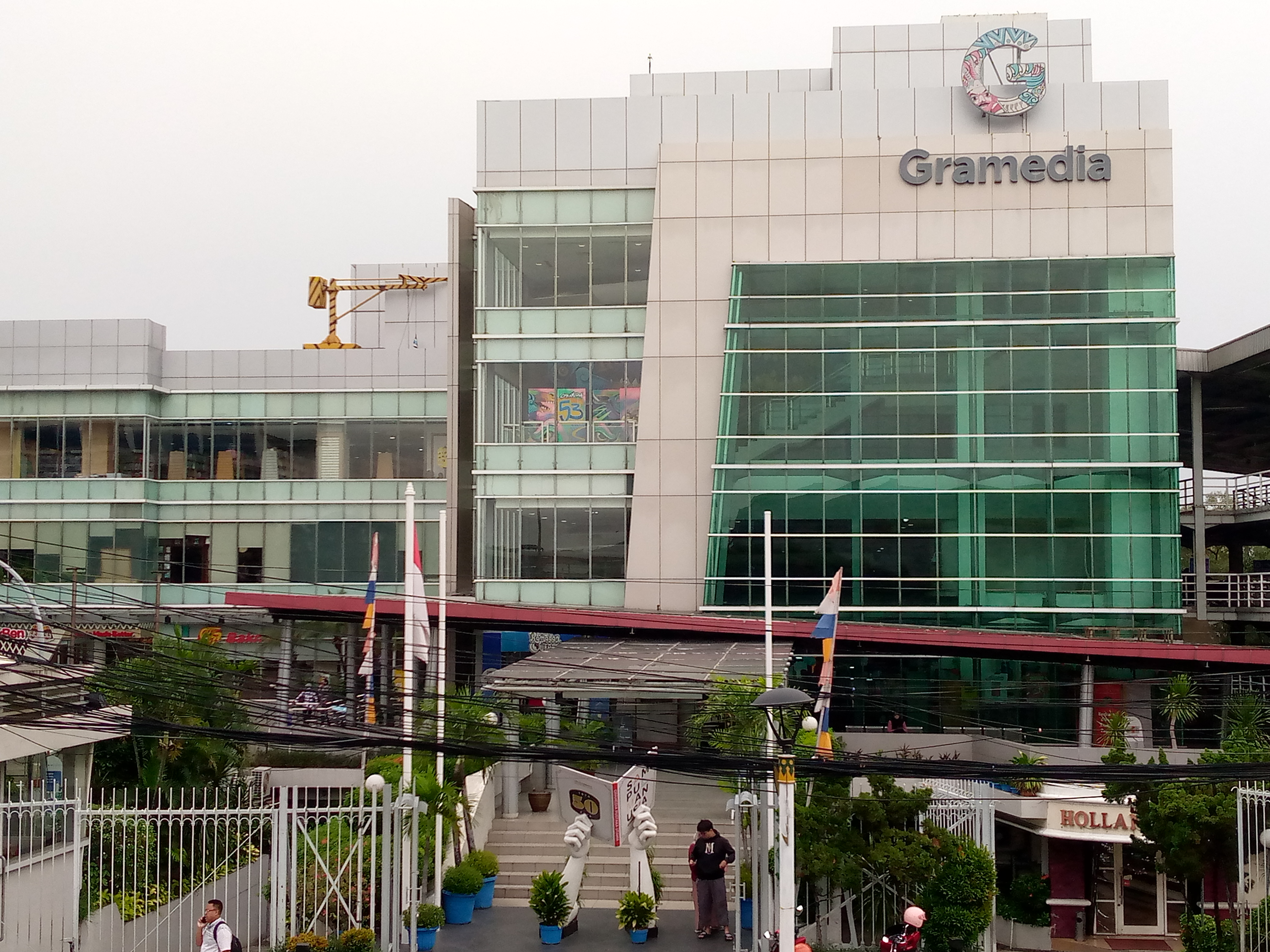
- A Gramedia store in Matraman, East Jakarta
- Trade name: Gramedia
- Type: Subsidiary
- Industry: Bookstore
- Founded: February 2, 1970; 56 years ago
- Founder: P. K. Ojong
- Headquarters: Jakarta, Indonesia
- Parent: Kompas Gramedia
- Website: www.gramedia.com (online store); www.gramedia.id (official site)

Gramedia Asri Media (commonly known as Gramedia) is a subsidiary of Kompas Gramedia Group that operates a chain of bookstores under the name Toko Buku Gramedia in several cities across Indonesia. The company was founded on 2 February 1970, starting with a small 25 m² bookstore in West Jakarta, and by 2023 it had grown to more than 120 stores spread across Indonesia. In addition to books, Gramedia Bookstore offers a variety of other products such as stationery, office supplies, sports equipment, musical instruments and computer products

Gramedia Bookstore was established by the founder P.K. Ojong since his goal was to distribute books across Indonesia.

== History ==
=== Inception ===
Gramedia Bookstore was founded on 2 February 1970, by P.K. Ojong and Jakob Oetama under the Kompas Gramedia Group. The first retail unit operated in a 25 m² shophouse located on Gajah Mada Road, Jakarta. The establishment of this entity was driven by a strategic mission to build a "civilization infrastructure" by providing affordable literacy access for the Indonesian people.

=== Expansion ===
Entering the 1980s, Gramedia executed a vertical integration strategy by strengthening its publishing line through the formation of several entities, including Gramedia Pustaka Utama (GPU), Elex Media Komputindo, and Grasindo. The company continued to expand across various cities and regions in Indonesia. As of 2023, Gramedia operates 120 branches across 33 cities in Indonesia and continues to expand to this day.

== Innovations To Retail Stores ==
=== New Experience ===
On 9 May 2015 Gramedia launched a new concept and logo; this new concept carries the "New Experience", a Gramedia bookstore concept divided into rooms or "chambers" based on diverse themes. This concept was first implemented at the Gramedia Bookstore, Central Park Branch, Jakarta. Meanwhile, the new logo is a logotype with the letter "G" and the word "Gramedia," which carries the meaning of creativity, flexibility, progress, change, and the strength to provide ideas and inspiration in educating the life of the Indonesian nation.

=== Jalma ===
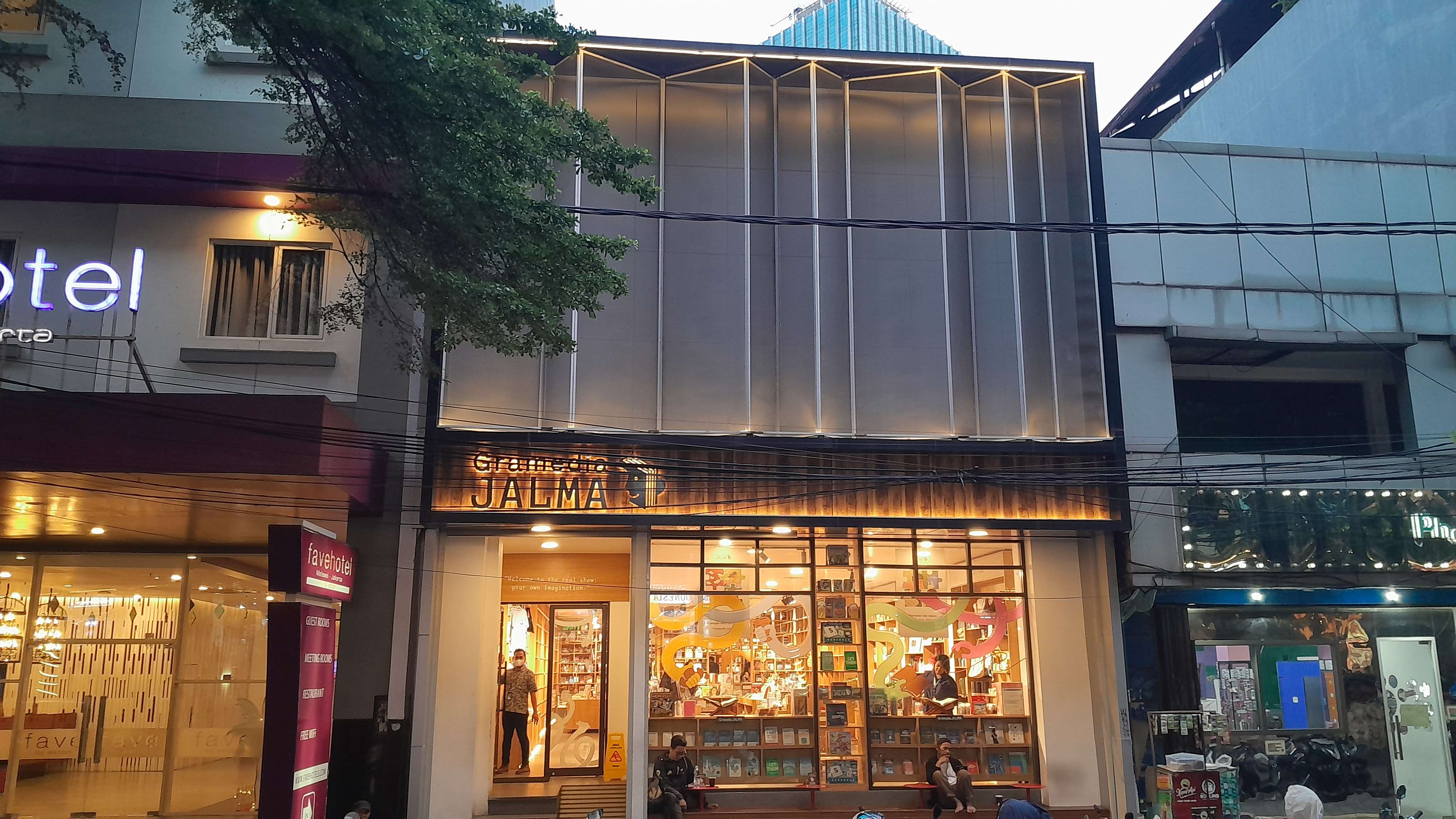
Gramedia Melawai (Blok M) Branch Under New Concept "Jalma"

In 2025 Gramedia launched its latest store concept called "Jalma," which was first implemented at the Gramedia Melawai Branch (Blok M) in South Jakarta. The name ‘Jalma’ is adapted from the Sundanese and Javanese languages, meaning "human", reflecting the company's vision to provide a space for individual interaction through literacy.

This format differs from other conventional Gramedia retail outlets as it emphasizes the functionality of community spaces, creator collaboration areas, and aesthetic interior design to optimize the customer experience. The store integrates a curated collection of literature with lifestyle areas, stationery, and public discussion spaces to facilitate various literacy activities such as book clubs, seminars, and art exhibitions.
