= Ministry of Communication and Digital Affairs =

Government ministry of Indonesia

- Kementerian Komunikasi dan Digital

Ministry overview
- Formed: 19 August 1945 as Department of Information; 9 August 2001 as State Ministry of Communication and Information
- Preceding agencies: Department of Information (1945–1999); State Ministry of Communication and Information (2001–2005); Department of Communication and Informatics (2005–2009); Ministry of Communication and Informatics (2009–2024)
- Jurisdiction: Government of Indonesia
- Headquarters: Jalan Medan Merdeka Barat No. 9 Jakarta Pusat 10110 Jakarta, Indonesia
- Minister responsible: Meutya Hafid, Minister of Communication and Digital Affairs
- Deputy Ministers responsible: Nezar Patria, First Deputy Minister of Communication and Digital Affairs; Angga Raka Prabowo, Second Deputy Minister of Communication and Digital Affairs
- Parent department: Coordinating Ministry for Political and Security Affairs
- Website: www.komdigi.go.id

Current logo in Indonesian version

The Ministry of Communication and Digital Affairs (MCDA; Indonesian: Kementerian Komunikasi dan Digital; abbreviated as Komdigi) is an Indonesian government ministry that is responsible for digital communications, information affairs and internet censorship. The ministry reports to the president and is currently led by Meutya Hafid, the Minister of Communication and Digital Affairs.

The current form of the ministry was established in 2001 by President Megawati Sukarnoputri after its predecessor, the Department of Information (Indonesian: Departemen Penerangan, lit. 'Department of Enlightenment', abbreviated Deppen), was abolished by President Abdurrahman Wahid in 1999. Deppen itself was created on 19 August 1945, during the National Revolution.

== Organization ==
Former logo as Ministry of Communication and Information Technology, used from 2007 until 2024

By Presidential Decree No. 174/2024 and as expanded by Coordinating Ministry for Infrastructure and Regional Development Decree No. 1/2025, the Ministry is organized as follows:

- Office of the Minister
- Office of the First Deputy Minister
- Office of the Second Deputy Minister
- Board of Experts
  - Senior Expert to the Minister on Law
  - Senior Expert to the Minister on Social Affairs, Economics, and Culture
  - Senior Expert to the Minister on Communications and Mass Media
  - Senior Expert to the Minister on Technological Affairs
- General Secretariat
  - Office of the General Secretary
  - Bureau of Planning
  - Bureau of Human Resources and Organization
  - Bureau of Finance and State Properties
  - Bureau of Legal Affairs
  - Bureau of General Affairs
  - Bureau of Public Communication
  - Centers (attached to the Secretariat General)
    - Center of Data and Information Infrastructures
    - Center of International Relations
    - Center of Strategic Policies
    - Secretariat of Indonesian Central Broadcasting Commission
    - Secretariat of Press Council
    - Secretariat of Indonesian Central Information Commission
- Directorate General of Digital Infrastructures (Directorate General I)
  - DG I Secretariat
  - Directorate of Strategies and Policies for Digital Infrastructure
  - Management Directorate of Spectra, Radio Frequencies, Satellites Orbit, and Digital Infrastructure Standards
  - Directorate of Digital Infrastructure Services
  - Directorate of Digital Infrastructure Acceleration
  - Directorate of Digital Infrastructure Control
  - Indonesian Center for Telecommunication Devices Testing (also known as Indonesian Digital Test House)
  - Class I Radio Frequency Spectrum Monitoring Institutes (located at Jakarta, Tangerang, Medan, Pekanbaru, Palembang, Bandung, Semarang, Surabaya, Yogyakarta, Denpasar, Kupang, Samarinda, and Makassar)
  - Class II Radio Frequency Spectrum Monitoring Institutes (located at Batam, Pontianak, Manado, Jayapura, Merauke, Padang, Jambi, Bengkulu, Lampung, Banjarmasin, Palangkaraya, Mataram, and Palu)
  - Radio Frequency Spectrum Monitoring Stations (located at Pangkal Pinang, Gorontalo, Mamuju, Manokwari, and Tanjung Selor)
  - Agency for Telecommunication and Information Accessibility (Supervised Organization)
    - Directorate of Resources and Administration
    - Directorate of Finance
    - Directorate of IT Services for Enterprises
    - Directorate of IT Services for Public and Government
    - Directorate of Infrastructure
    - Internal Investigation Unit
- Directorate General of Digital Governance Technology (Directorate General II)
  - DG II Secretariat
  - Directorate of Strategies and Policies for Digital Governance Technology
  - Directorate of Digital Governance Infrastructure
  - Directorate of Digital Governance Applications
  - Directorate of Regional Digital Governance Technology Acceleration
- Directorate General of Digital Ecosystems (Directorate General III)
  - DG III Secretariat
  - Directorate of Digital Ecosystem Development
  - Directorate of Artificial Intelligence and Novel Technologies Ecosystem
  - Directorate of Postal Services and Broadcasting
  - Directorate of Digital Ecosystem Services
  - Directorate of Digital Ecosystem Control
- Directorate General of Digital Space Supervision (Directorate General IV)
  - DG IV Secretariat
  - Directorate of Strategies and Policies for Digital Space Supervision
  - Directorate of Certification and Electronic Transactions Supervision
  - Directorate of Digital Investigation
  - Directorate of Digital Space Control
- Directorate General of Public Communications and Media Affairs (Directorate General V)
  - DG V Secretariat
  - Directorate of Public Information
  - Directorate of Public Communication
  - Directorate of Interinstitutional Communication Partnerships and Public Relations
  - Directorate of Media Ecosystem
- Inspectorate General
  - Inspectorate General Secretariat
  - Inspectorate I
  - Inspectorate II
  - Inspectorate III
  - Inspectorate IV
- Agency for Human Resource Development of Communication and Digital Affairs
  - Agency for Human Resource Development of Communication and Information Technology Secretariat
  - Center of Ecosystem and Human Resources Development for Communication and Digital Affairs
  - Center of Talent Development
  - Center of Digital Literation Development
  - Center of Apparatuses Development for Center for Talent Development
  - "MMTC" Multimedia College
  - Indonesian Center for Human Resource Development and Research in Communication and Informatics, Medan
  - Indonesian Center for Human Resource Development and Research in Communication and Informatics, Makassar
  - Indonesian Institute for Human Resource Development and Research in Communication and Informatics, Jakarta
  - Indonesian Institute for Human Resource Development and Research in Communication and Informatics, Bandung
  - Indonesian Institute for Human Resource Development and Research in Communication and Informatics, Yogyakarta
  - Indonesian Institute for Human Resource Development and Research in Communication and Informatics, Manado
  - Indonesian Institute for Human Resource Development and Research in Communication and Informatics, Banjarmasin
  - Indonesian Institute for Human Resource Development and Research in Communication and Informatics, Surabaya
  - Indonesian ICT Training Center, Cikarang

== Controversy ==
The ministry is often criticized for its censorship, as it blocks websites "to protect its citizen from hoax" [sic]. In 2020, the Director General Ministry Semuel Abrijani Pangerapan and Johnny G. Plate introduced a law that requires foreign companies to register under the Electronic System Provider (Penyelenggara Sistem Elektronik; PSE) list which could give the government access to the citizen's personal info and threaten the company to block access from the country if the company did not register. The law was revised and passed in 2021.

In July 2022, a ban was implemented for several notable websites such as PayPal, Epic Games, Steam, Origin, and Yahoo, and games such as Counter-Strike: Global Offensive and Dota 2 as they did not register under the ministry's new law. Access to PayPal, Steam, CSGO, Dota 2, and Yahoo would later be allowed for once more by 2 August 2022.

=== Censorship of Wikipedia ===
Since 25 February 2026, Minister of Communication and Digital Affairs Meutya Hafid has ordered a controversial ban to access to Wikimedia's authentication domain (auth.wikimedia.org) due to the foundation's non-compliance of registering themselves under the Electronic System Provider law. This prevents users from logging in or creating accounts on all Wikimedia projects, including Wikipedia. Rights groups have condemned the ministry decision as digital authoritarian abuse and called for the restoration of normal access.

On 25 March 2026, Wikimedia Commons domain was also blocked in the country; it has since been unblocked, while Wikimedia's authentication portal is still blocked.

On 16 April 2026, the Indonesian government threatened to block the entire Wikipedia and all other Wikimedia Foundation subsidiaries within 7 business days, citing the PSE law.

== See also ==
- Antara
- Indonesian Broadcasting Commission
- National Cyber and Crypto Agency
