= Keng Po (newspaper) =

Malay-language Peranakan Chinese newspaper published in Batavia, Dutch East Indies

Keng Po (Chinese: 競報; pinyin: Jìng bào) was a Malay language Peranakan Chinese newspaper published in Batavia, Dutch East Indies (later Jakarta) from 1923 to 1958. During most of that time it was the second-most popular Malay-language Chinese newspaper in the Indies after Sin Po. It was also an important paper in the early period of Indonesian independence in the 1950s.

== History ==
=== Dutch East Indies ===
Keng Po was founded in Batavia, Dutch East Indies in 1923 by Hauw Tek Kong, an English-educated journalist and Chinese activist who had been director of the competing paper Sin Po in the 1910s, and had been banned from the Indies from 1919 until 1922 for his anti-Dutch views. Hauw apparently founded the paper in the midst of disagreement with Tjoe Bou San of Sin Po. Upon founding the paper he appointed himself director and editor-in-chief. Khoe Woen Sioe, who would be director of the paper in later years, joined as an editor at some point in the early years.

In 1925 Khoe was arrested in a high-profile Persdelict (press offense) case for an article he published which criticized the hate speech laws in the Indies which fell very harshly upon native and Chinese editors and writers. His case itself was not noteworthy, but rather his poor treatment in the Glodok prison became the subject of discussion in the Dutch language press of the Indies, which took offense at the sight of a 20-year-old journalist being paraded in front of the public in shackles and chains without having been found guilty of anything. He was eventually sentenced to 3 months imprisonment.

When Hauw Tek Kong, the founder of Keng Po, died in April of 1928, one of his former colleagues from Sin Po, Lauw Giok Lan, became the new editor-in-chief. However, he fell ill and did not stay in the position for long. Nio Joe Lan, who had recently been invited to the paper by Lauw, a family friend, was then made editor-in-chief.

In the spring of 1932 another editor of Keng Po, Tan Boen Soan, left to become editor-in-chief of a competing paper, Warna Warta. In 1935 Keng Po went through a period of further reorganization; among the changes, Nio Joe Lan left the paper to join Sin Po. After the reorganization, in 1938, lawyer and journalist Injo Beng Goat became one of the new editors of the paper.

In early 1939, two editors of Keng Po, Zain Sanibar and Injo Beng Goat were brought to court under a Persdelict (press offence) over an article they had printed about the Regent of Pandeglang a year earlier. Almost immediately Injo was brought before the court once again for an insulting article he printed about Adolf Hitler, calling him a fool who had been unpopular in school, bad with women, constantly having suicidal thoughts, an illegitimate child, and so on. When brought before a magistrate in Batavia, Injo was unrepentant and did not think he had done anything wrong, but merely described Hitler accurately.

=== Indonesia ===
Keng Po emerged in the new era of Indonesian independence as one of the most popular newspapers in the country, and a strong voice of independent opposition. However, before long the paper chafed against the increasingly restrictive treatment of the press by the Indonesian government. Injo Beng Goat, who remained editor in the new era, was arrested in the 1957 for printing content that was seen as disloyal to President Sukarno. The newspaper was also temporarily banned from publication during that time.

Khoe Woen Sioe remained director of Keng Po in the independence era, as well as its weekly magazine Star Weekly.

In 1958, in the middle of an official campaign against Chinese language and symbols from the Indonesian government, Keng Po changed its name to Pos Indonesia (Indonesian: Indonesia Post). It ceased publication in the 1960s.
