= Khairun University =

Indonesian public university in Ternate City, North Maluku

- Universitas Khairun
- Type: Public
- Established: 15 August 1964
- Rector: Husen Alting
- Location: Ternate, North Maluku, Indonesia; 0°45′45.2″N 127°20′10.6″E
- Website: unkhair.ac.id

Khairun University is an Indonesian public university in Ternate City, North Maluku. Named after Sultan Khairun, it was founded in 1964 initially as a partner of the Sam Ratulangi University in Manado. The university was nationalized in 2004, making it a state-operated institution. In 2016, the university claimed a student count of 1,120 with 115 teaching staff, over double of 550 in 2014. The university offers both undergraduate and postgraduate programs.

In 2017, following the prohibition of Hizbut Tahrir Indonesia, the university demanded all its teaching staff affiliated with the organization to resign.
