= Albert Hasibuan =

Indonesian lawyer and politician (1939–2022)

Member of the Presidential Advisory Council
- In office 2012–2015

Member of the People's Representative Council
- In office 1977–1997

Personal details
- Born: 25 March 1939 Bandung, Dutch East Indies
- Died: 1 September 2022 (aged 83) Jakarta, Indonesia
- Education: Christian University of Indonesia; Waseda University; Gadjah Mada University
- Occupation: Lawyer, Politician
- Known for: Co-founder of PAN (Partai Amanat Nasional), Co-founder of Komnas HAM

Albert Hasibuan (25 March 1939 – 1 September 2022) was an Indonesian politician. He served on the People's Representative Council from 1977 to 1997.

Hasibuan died in Jakarta on 1 September 2022, at the age of 83.
