= Onghokham =

Indonesian historian and public intellectual (1933–2007)

- 王福涵
- Portrait, c. 1980s
- Born: 1 May 1933; Soerabaja, Dutch East Indies (now Surabaya, Indonesia)
- Died: 30 August 2007 (aged 74); Jakarta, Indonesia
- Education: University of Indonesia; Yale University
- Scientific career
- Fields: History
- Workplaces: University of Indonesia
- Thesis: The Residency of Madiun: Priyayi and Peasant in the Nineteenth Century (1975)
- Doctoral advisor: Harry J. Benda

Chinese name
- Chinese: 王福涵
Transcriptions
Standard Mandarin
- Hanyu Pinyin: Wáng Fúhán
- Wade–Giles: Wang Fu-han
Southern Min
- Hokkien POJ: Ông Hok-hâm

Onghokham (Note: In 1961, Ong changed his name by joining Ong Hok Ham into Onghokham.) (Chinese: 王福涵; pinyin: Wáng Fúhán; 1 May 1933 – 30 August 2007), formerly spelled as Ong Hok Ham, was an Indonesian historian and public intellectual of Chinese-Indonesian descent. He was an expert in Indonesian history who wrote and published extensively. He was also a hedonist known for his eccentric lifestyle. He was one of Indonesia’s most famous historians.

Onghokham was considered one of the leading experts on Indonesian history during the 19th century Dutch colonial rule. His particular area of knowledge centered on events in Java during the period, and he authored a number of works dealing with the subject.

A native of Surabaya, East Java which, until the founding of Indonesia in 1945, was a part of the Dutch East Indies, Ong Hok Ham lived in the city of his birth for the first twenty-five years of his life. Ong's family was upper-middle class, but through his maternal grandmother, Han Loen Nio, Ong hailed from the patrician Han family of Lasem, part of the baba bangsawan or the Chinese gentry of colonial Indonesia, and from a long line of Chinese officers who served in the civil bureaucracy in the Dutch East Indies. Ong could, thus, trace his lineage in Java back, through Han Bwee Kong, Kapitein der Chinezen (1727–1778), to Han Siong Kong (1673–1743), a Chinese-born migrant of ancient lineage. Like others from old Peranakan Chinese families, Ong grew up between Chinese, Javanese and Dutch cultures.

In 1958, Ong moved to Bandung, West Java, where he received his schooling and began his writing career. He became increasingly well known for the historical and cultural articles he wrote for the Jakarta-based magazine Star Weekly. In 1975, he received his Ph.D. in history from Yale University with the dissertation The Residency of Madiun: Priyayi and Peasant in the Nineteenth Century.

He was a regular contributor to the Indonesian magazine Tempo and a collection of his pieces for the magazine written between 1976 and 2001, Wahyu yang Hilang, Negeri yang Guncang (A Lost Mandate, an Agitated Country) was published in 2002.

He wrote a series of other books, mostly a collection of essays and articles, including Runtuhnya Hindia Belanda (The Fall of the Netherlands Indies), Negara dan Rakyat (The State and the People), and Dari Soal Priayi sampai Nyi Blorong—Refleksi Historis Nusantara (From Priayi to Nyi Blorong—Historical Reflections on the Indonesian Archipelago).

An English-language collection of his writings, The Thugs, the Curtain Thief, and the Sugar Lord, received publication in 2003. The book chronicled power, politics and culture in colonial Java.

In 1989, he retired from his duties as professor of history at the University of Indonesia. His final responsibility was as chairman of the Lembaga Studi Sejarah Indonesia (the Indonesian Institute of Historical Studies).

Ong Hok Ham suffered a stroke in 2001 and died six years later at Dharmais Cancer Hospital in West Jakarta at the age of 74.

== See also ==
- List of Chinese Indonesians
