= Petrus Kanisius Ojong =

Indonesian journalist and businessman

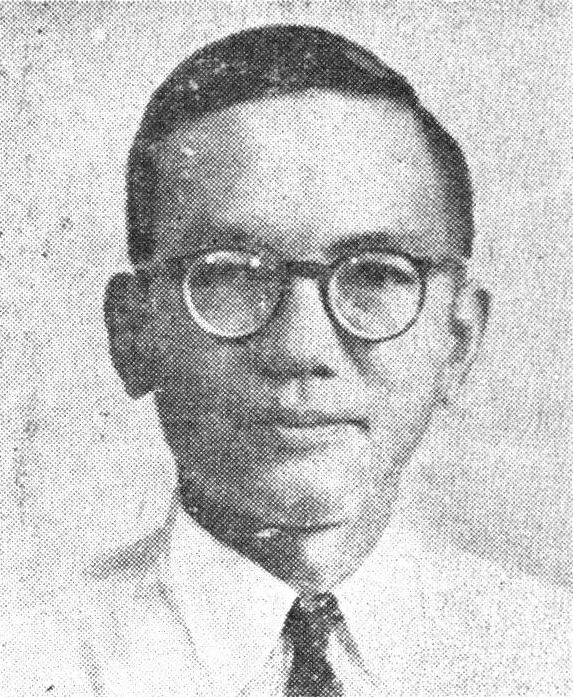
- Born: Auwjong Peng Koen; 25 July 1920; Fort de Kock, Dutch East Indies
- Died: 31 May 1980 (aged 59); Jakarta, Indonesia
- Education: University of Indonesia
- Years active: 1965–1980
- Known for: Founder of Kompas daily & Gramedia
- Spouse: Catherine Oei Kian Kiat
- Children: 6

P. K. Ojong
- Traditional Chinese: 歐陽炳昆
- Simplified Chinese: 欧阳炳昆
Transcriptions
Standard Mandarin
- Hanyu Pinyin: Ōuyáng Bǐngkūn
- Wade–Giles: Ouyang Ping-k'un

Indonesian name
- Indonesian: Auwjong Peng-koen

Petrus Kanisius Ojong (25 July 1920 – 31 May 1980), better known as P. K. Ojong, was an Indonesian journalist and businessman who was one of the founders of Kompas Gramedia Group, Indonesia's largest conglomerate and Kompas, one of Indonesia's most circulated daily newspapers, together with Jakob Oetama.

== Early life ==
Auwjong Peng Koen was born in Bukittinggi on July 25, 1920. He belonged to the Minnan (Hokkien) ethnic group with ancestry from Kinmen (Quemoy) island. Since childhood, his father, Auwjong Pauw, always taught him to be disciplined, economical, and hard working. His father was a farmer in Quemoy Island (part of Fujian Province, Taiwan). He moved to Sumatra, Dutch East Indies (now Indonesia) to get a better job.

Even though Auwjong Pauw eventually became a tobacco lord, he never pampered his children. His teachings had really shaped Peng Koen's character, molding him into a serious and straightforward person.

Peng Koen attended the Hollandsche Chineesche School (primary school for the Chinese), when he was introduced to Catholic teachings, and finally converted to Catholicism and received the baptismal name of Andreas.

== Higher education ==
Peng Koen went to Hollandsche Chineesche Kweekschool to pursue his study. During this time, he was appointed as a leader of students organization. His task was to prepare reading material for the members and planning the Chinese New Year celebration and year-end picnic.

He loved to read newspapers and magazines. Whereas other students just read the articles, Peng Koen tried to digest the writing styles and the ideas of every article. It is said that Peng Koen was a bit 'stiff' when he faced the opposite sex. One of his ex-classmates, Oei Yin Hwa, who owned a sweets shop in Cianjur, recalled that Peng Koen was known as verstrooide professor or "forgetful professor". He was also known for having a serious demeanor.

== Career life ==
Peng Koen was a teacher before he became a journalist. He studied at a teacher's college in Jakarta and worked as a teacher from 1940 to 1942. His career as teacher was ended when Japan attacked Indonesia and closed all the existing schools at that time.

He also worked for Star Weekly, a Malay-language weekly which targeted non-Chinese-speaking Indonesian Chinese, starting in 1946. He continued working there (while sometimes working for other magazines as well) until it was banned in 1960. During that time he also had an opportunity to work with Felix Tan.

== Social Work ==
PK Ojong actively took part in a social organization called Sin Ming Hui, which was established by Khoe Woen Sioe and Injo Beng Goat. The organisation was housed in one of Jakarta's best-known historic landmarks, Candra Naya.

== Post life ==
PK Ojong died in Jakarta in 1980. His biography, PK Ojong: Hidup Sederhana, Berpikir Mulia was published in 2001. The author of the book is Helen Ishwara. The book contains PK Ojong's experiences with the background of Old Order and New Order

== See also ==
- Famous Indonesian Chinese
- Indonesian Chinese
