= Consultative Council for Indonesian Citizenship =

Political organization in Indonesia (1954–1966)

Consultative Body for Indonesian Citizenship Badan Permusjawaratan Kewarganegaraan Indonesia
- Abbreviation: Baperki
- Chairman: Siauw Giok Tjhan
- Founded: 13 March 1954
- Banned: 12 March 1966
- Ideology: Minority interests
- Political position: Left-wing

The Consultative Body for Indonesian Citizenship (Indonesian: Badan Permusjawaratan Kewarganegaraan Indonesia), (Note: Spelling under the Republican Spelling System that was used from 1947 to 1972. Under modern Indonesian orthography the word permusjawaratan would be spelled as permusyawaratan.) better known by the Indonesian abbreviation Baperki, was a political organisation in Indonesia that was formed to promote the rights and interests of Chinese Indonesians. Baperki stood in the 1955 Indonesian legislative election, winning 0.5% of the vote, and was awarded one seat in the People's Representative Council. The organization sponsored schools including Res Publica University (1960). The group was associated with the Indonesian Communist Party (PKI). After the 1965 coup attempt in Indonesia, Res Publika was burned down and replaced by a new school, Trisakti, and the group was banned.

== See also ==
- Chinese Indonesians
