= Siauw Giok Tjhan =

Indonesian politician and activist (1914–1981)

- 蕭玉燦
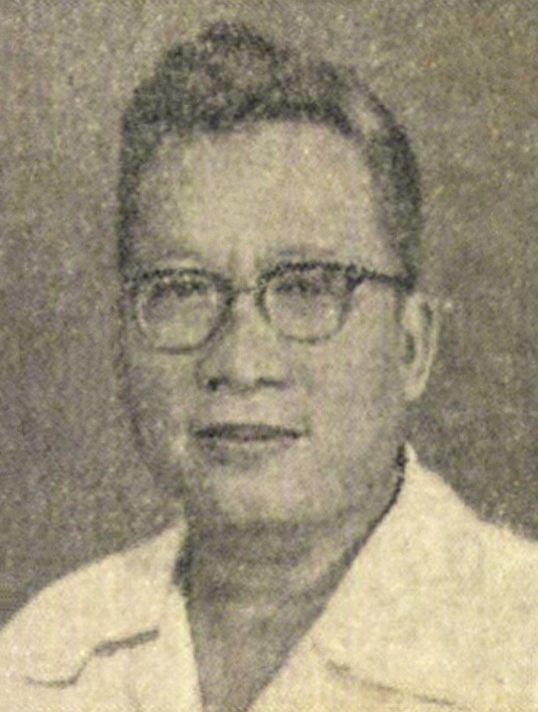
- Official portrait, c. 1956

Chairman of Baperki
- In office 13 March 1954 – 12 March 1966
- Preceded by: Office established
- Succeeded by: Office abolished

Member of the House of Representatives
- In office 17 February 1950 – 1 April 1966

Member of the Constitutional Assembly
- In office 9 November 1956 – 5 July 1959

Personal details
- Born: 23 March 1914 Surabaya, Dutch East Indies (present-day Indonesia)
- Died: 20 November 1981 (aged 67) Leiden, Netherlands

Chinese name
- Chinese: 蕭玉燦
Transcriptions
Standard Mandarin
- Hanyu Pinyin: Xiāo Yùcàn

Siauw Giok Tjhan (Chinese: 蕭玉燦; pinyin: Xiāo Yùcàn; 23 March 1914 – 20 November 1981) was a Chinese Indonesian activist and politician. Born in Kapasan, Surabaya, East Java, Indonesia, he was an independent member of the Provisional House of Representatives in the early 1950s. He was briefly detained without charge during the August 1951 mass arrests. He became a cabinet minister under Indonesian president Sukarno and was imprisoned for 12 years by the subsequent president, Suharto for his left-wing beliefs. He was active in rights campaigning and was critical against the assimilation policies enacted towards Chinese Indonesians by Suharto. As a part of Baperki and the group's leader. He supported the Communist takeover of China, opposed to Taiwan, and was a Marxist, following his release he moved to the Netherlands where he remained till his death.
