= List of newspapers in Indonesia =

This is a list of newspapers in Indonesia.

== National newspapers ==
All newspapers listed below are in Indonesian.

=== General newspapers ===
Name	Format	First published	Owner	Circulation readership	Notes
Jawa Pos	Broadsheet/Tabloid (Note: Monday-Saturday edition in broadsheet, Sunday edition in tabloid.)	1949	Jawa Pos Group	450,000	
Kompas	Broadsheet	1965	Kompas Gramedia Group	880,990	
Koran Jakarta	Broadsheet	2008	PT Berita Nusantara		
Media Indonesia	Broadsheet	1970	Media Group	250,000	
Rakyat Merdeka	Broadsheet	1997	Jawa Pos Group		Political news daily

=== Business newspapers ===
Name	Format	First published	Owner	Notes
Bisnis Indonesia	Broadsheet	1985	Bisnis Indonesia Group	
Investor Daily	Broadsheet	2001	B Universe	
Kontan	Broadsheet	2007	Kompas Gramedia Group	Daily version of Kontan weekly newspaper

=== Sports newspapers ===
Name	Format	First published	Owner
Super Ball	Broadsheet	2017	Kompas Gramedia Group

=== Tabloids ===
Name	First published	Last published	Owner	Category
Nyata	1971	2026	Jawa Pos Group	Women's
Bola	1984	2018	Kompas Gramedia Group	Sports
Nova	1988	2022	Kompas Gramedia Group	Women's
Soccer	2000	2014	Kompas Gramedia Group	Football
Libero	1999	2001	Unknown	Football
Cempaka	1990	2019	Suara Merdeka Group	Women's
Exotica	2003	2006	Unknown	Men's Lifestyle
Buah Bibir	2002	2006	Unknown	Men's Lifestyle
Motor Plus	1999	2018	Kompas Gramedia Group	Automotive
Keren Beken!	2000	2012	Aneka Yess! Group	Teen
Otomotif	1991	present	Kompas Gramedia Group	Automotive
Komputek	1990	2014	Jawa Pos Group	Computer
Bintang	1991	2019	Media Bintang Indonesia	Entertainment
Wanita Indonesia	1989	2019	Citra Media Persada	Women's
Nakita	1999	2017	Kompas Gramedia Group	Family
Oto Plus	2003	2017	Kompas Gramedia Group	Automotive
Saji	2003	2021	Kompas Gramedia Group	Cooking
Genie	2005	2017	MNC Media	Women's
Realita	2006	2017	MNC Media	Reality
GO	1994	2006	Media Go	Sports
Sinyal	2005	2016	Kompas Gramedia Group	Mobile phone
Rumah	2003	2017	Kompas Gramedia Group	Housing
Kontan	1996	present	Kompas Gramedia Group	Business
PcPlus	2000	2013	Kompas Gramedia Group	Computer
Cek & Ricek	1998	2019	Cek & Ricek	Entertainment
Koki	2003	2020	Jawa Pos Group	Cooking
Femme	2009	2016	Jawa Pos Group	Women's
Nurani	2000	2017	Jawa Pos Group	Women's
Modis	2008	2017	Jawa Pos Group	Women's
Ototrend	2001	2018	Jawa Pos Group	Automotive
Posmo	1999	2019	Jawa Pos Group	History
Info Kecantikan	2006	2013	Jawa Pos Group	Women's
Gaul	2002	2014	Emtek	Teen
Pulsa	2003	2021	Pulsa Indomedia Pratama	Mobile phone
Hoplaa	1994	2000	Media Bintang Indonesia	Children
Mama Mia!	2007	2008	Emtek	Women's
Bintang Home	2003	2019	Media Bintang Indonesia	Housing
Cantiq	2006	2012	Jawa Pos Group	Women's
Media Umat	2009	present	Yayasan Halqah Islam	Islam
Kompetisi	1992	1997	Jawa Pos Group	Sports

== Local newspapers ==
All newspapers listed below are in Indonesian.

=== Newspaper chain ===
Note: Some members of these chain are shown below this sub-section.

- Jawa Pos News Network – owned by Jawa Pos Group
  - Sumatera Ekspres Group
  - Riau Pos Group
  - Fajar Indonesia Network
- Tribun Network – owned by Kompas Gramedia

=== List of newspapers ===
(*) indicates a local insertion of Jawa Pos

Aceh

- Prohaba
- Rakyat Aceh
- Serambi Indonesia
- Aceh News
- Media Andalas
- Seputar Aceh
- Pos Aceh

North Sumatra

- Analisa
- Metro Siantar
- Pos Metro Medan
- Sinar Indonesia Baru
- Sumut Pos
- Tribun Medan
- Waspada
- Metro Tabagsel
- Metro Asahan
- Mimbar Umum
- Metro 24
- Media 24 Jam
- Jurnal Asia
- Realitas
- Batak Pos
- Metro Tapanuli
- Harian Andalas
- Medan Pos
- Harian Mistar

West Sumatra

- Haluan
- Padang Ekspres
- Pos Metro Padang
- Rakyat Sumbar
- Singgalang
- Mimbar Minang
- Metro Andalas

Riau

- Haluan Riau
- Riau Pos
- Tribun Pekanbaru
- Metro Riau
- Dumai Pos
- Pekanbaru Pos
- Posmetro Indragiri
- Posmetro Rohil
- Posmetro Mandau
- Riau Pesisir
- Rakyat Riau
- Riau Mandiri
- Pekanbaru MX
- Koran Riau

Riau Island

- Haluan Kepri
- Pos Metro Batam
- Tanjungpinang Pos
- Batam Pos
- Tribun Batam

Jambi

- Bungo Independent
- Bute Ekspres
- Jambi Ekspres
- Jambi Independent
- Metro Jambi
- Tribun Jambi
- Radar Bute
- Bungo Pos
- Pedestrian Jambi
- Jambi One
- Halo Jambi

South Sumatra

- Lahat Pos
- Linggau Pos
- Palembang Independent
- Palembang Ekspres
- Palembang Pos
- Pos Metro Palembang
- Radar Palembang
- Rakyat Palembang
- Sriwijaya Post
- Sumatera Ekspres
- Tribun Sumsel
- Prabumulih Pos
- Enim Ekspres
- Harian Oku Selatan
- Pagaralam Pos
- Harian Musi Banyuasin
- Harian Banyuasin
- Oku Timur Pos
- Rakyat Empat Lawang
- Harian Silampari
- Oki News
- Suara Pancasila

Bangka Belitung

- Babel Pos
- Bangka Pos
- Pos Belitung
- Belitong Ekspres
- Babel News
- Negeri Laskar Pelangi
- Rakyat Pos

Bengkulu

- Bengkulu Ekspress
- Curup Ekspress
- Radar Lebong
- Radar Kepahiang
- Radar Seluma
- Radar Utara
- Rakyat Bengkulu
- Radar Bengkulu
- Rakyat Benteng
- Radar Kaur
- Radar Mukomuko
- Radar Pat Petulai
- Radar Selatan

Lampung

- Lampung Ekspress
- Lampung Post
- Radar Lampung
- Radar Lambar
- Radar Lamsel
- Radar Lamteng
- Tribun Lampung
- Radar Tanggamus
- Cakra Lampung
- Radar Kotabumi
- Radar Way Kanan
- Fajar Sumatera
- Pikiran Lampung
- Kupas Tuntas
- Medinas Lampung
- Haluan Lampung
- Rilis.id Lampung

Banten

- Banten Pos
- Banten Raya
- Radar Banten
- Tangerang Ekspres
- Tangsel Pos
- Kabar Banten
- Tangerang Raya
- Kontak Banten
- Tangsel Xpress
- Satelit News

Special Capital Region of Jakarta

- Poskota
- Warta Kota
- Pelita Baru
- Koran Jakarta
- Jaya Pos

West Java

- Cianjur Ekspres
- Galamedia
- Jabar Ekspres
- Pasundan Ekspres
- Pikiran Rakyat
- Radar Bandung
- Radar Bekasi
- Kabar Priangan
- Radar Bogor
- Radar Cirebon
- Radar Depok
- Radar Karawang
- Radar Sukabumi
- Radar Tasikmalaya
- Sumedang Ekspres
- Tribun Jabar
- Galura
- Inilah Koran
- Debar News
- Rakyat Bogor
- Bogor Today
- Suara Cirebon
- Harian Metropolitan
- Radar Garut
- Fajar Cirebon
- Koran Gala
- Radar Cianjur
- Cikarang Ekspres
- Seputar Jabar
- Radar Indramayu
- Radar Kuningan
- Radar Majalengka
- Rakyat Cirebon
- Kabar Cirebon
- Karawang Bekasi Ekspres
- Bandung Pos

Central Java

- Semarang Post
- Suara Merdeka
- Solopos
- Tribun Jateng
- Wawasan
- Radar Tegal
- Radar Semarang*
- Radar Pekalongan
- Radar Banyumas
- Radar Kudus*
- Radar Solo*
- Radar Purwokerto
- Jateng Pos
- Lingkar
- Rakyat Jateng
- Magelang Ekspres
- Purworejo Ekspres
- Joglo Jateng
- Joglosemar
- Warta Jateng
- Meteor

Special Region of Yogyakarta

- Harian Jogja
- Kedaulatan Rakyat
- Koran Merapi
- Minggu Pagi (weekly)
- Radar Jogja*
- Tribun Jogja
- Merapi

East Java

- Harian Bhirawa
- Malang Post
- Malang Posco Media
- Memorandum
- Radar Banyuwangi*
- Radar Mojokerto*
- Radar Jember*
- Radar Madiun*
- Radar Bromo*
- Radar Kediri*
- Radar Bojonegoro*
- Radar Malang*
- Radar Madura*
- Radar Tulungagung*
- Radar Semeru*
- Radar Surabaya
- Surabaya Pagi
- Surya
- Bisnis Surabaya
- Malang Ekspres
- Memo X
- Duta Masyarakat
- Suara Media Nasional
- Kabar Madura
- Koran Madura
- Harian Bangsa
- Disway
- Surabaya Post
- Jatim Mandiri

Bali

- Bali Post
- Tribun Bali
- Radar Bali
- Bali Express
- Denpost
- Fajar Bali
- Media Bali
- Paswara
- Nusa Bali
- Bali Tribune

West Nusa Tenggara

- Lombok Post
- Suara NTB
- Radar Sumbawa
- Bimeks
- Radar Lombok
- Radar Mandalika

East Nusa Tenggara

- Pos Kupang
- Timor Ekspres
- Flores Pos
- Ekora NTT
- Erende Pos

West Kalimantan

- Kapuas Pos
- Metro Pontianak
- Pontianak Post
- Tribun Pontianak
- Harian Equator
- Berkat
- Rakyat Kalbar
- Suara Pemred

Central Kalimantan

- Kalteng Pos
- Radar Sampit
- Tabengan
- Palangka Pos
- Palangka Ekspres
- Borneonews
- Radar Pangkalan Bun
- Media Kalteng
- Kalteng Ekspres

East Kalimantan

- Balikpapan Pos
- Bontang Post
- Kaltim Post
- Koran Kaltim
- Samarinda Pos
- Tribun Kaltim
- Swara Kaltim
- Berau Post
- Kata Kaltim
- Metro Samarinda

South Kalimantan

- Banjarmasin Post
- Kalselpos
- Radar Banjarmasin
- Barito Post
- Mata Banua
- Kalimantan Post
- Metro Banjar

North Kalimantan

- Radar Tarakan
- Kaltara Pos
- Bulungan Post

North Sulawesi

- Bolmong Raya
- Koran Manado
- Manado Post
- Radar Manado
- Tribun Manado
- Radar Bolmong
- Posko Manado
- Harian Komentar
- Sulut Post

South Sulawesi

- Berita Kota Makassar
- Fajar
- Palopo Pos
- Pare Pos
- Rakyat Sulsel
- Radar Bone
- Radar Selatan
- Tribun Bone
- Tribun Timur
- Ujungpandang Ekspres
- Koran Seruya
- Radar Makassar
- Celebes News
- Pedoman Rakyat

Southeast Sulawesi

- Buton Pos
- Kendari Ekspres
- Kendari Pos
- Rakyat Sultra
- Sultra Satu
- Berita Kota Kendari
- Kolaka Pos
- Baubau Post

Central Sulawesi

- Luwuk Post
- Palu Ekspres
- Radar Palu
- Metro Sulawesi
- Mercusuar
- Sulteng Raya
- Poso Raya
- Kaili Post
- Pos Palu
- Banggai Raya

Gorontalo

- Gorontalo Post
- Radar Gorontalo
- Rakyat Gorontalo

West Sulawesi

- Radar Sulbar
- Sulbar Express
- Polman Ekspres

Maluku

- Ambon Ekspres
- Siwalima
- Rakyat Maluku
- Berita Kota Ambon
- Kabar Timur

North Maluku

- Malut Post
- Radar Halmahera
- Fajar Malut
- Posko Malut

West Papua

- Radar Papua

Southwest Papua

- Radar Sorong
- Papua Barat Pos

Papua

- Cenderawasih Pos
- Koran Jubi (weekly)

Central Papua

- Radar Timika
- Timika Express

South Papua

- Radar Merauke

== Foreign-language newspapers ==
=== Chinese ===
- Harian Indonesia
- Harian Inhua
- Harian Nusantara
- Indonesia Shang Bao
- Yinni Guoji Ribao (International Daily News)
- Xun Bao
- Kun Dian Ri Bao

=== English ===
- International Bali Post
- The Bali Times
- The Jakarta Post
- Independent Observer

=== Japanese ===
- The Daily Jakarta Shimbun (じゃかるた新聞)

== Defunct and historical newspapers ==
=== Malay/Indonesian ===
==== Contemporary (1945–present) ====
- Bernas (Yogyakarta) – ceased publication in 2018, continued online
- Harian Bola – daily version of Bola
- Harian Pelita (Jakarta) – ceased publication in 2019, continued online
- Indonesia Raya (Jakarta)
- Indopos (Jakarta) – ceased publication in 2020, continued online
- Koran Sindo (Jakarta) – ceased publication in 2023
- Koran Tempo (Jakarta) – ceased publication in 2020, digital version ceased in 2024
- Republika (Jakarta) – ceased publication in 2022, continued online
- Sinar Harapan (Jakarta) – ceased publication in 2015, continued online
- Suara Pembaruan (Jakarta)
- Sin Po (Jakarta, Indonesian-language edition)
- Suara Karya – continued online
- Surabaya Post (East Java)
- Warta Bhakti (Jakarta)

==== Historical (defunct before 1945) ====
- Djawa Tengah (Central Java)
- Han Po (Palembang)
- Medan Prijaji
- Neratja
- Pemandangan
- Perniagaan
- Selompret Melajoe (Central Java)
- Sikap
- Tjahaja Timoer (East Java)
- Tjhoen Tjhioe
- Warna Warta (Central Java)

==== Party-owned ====
- Abadi (Masyumi)
- Harian Rakjat (Communist Party of Indonesia)
- Pedoman (Indonesian Socialist Party)
- Suara Katolik (Catholic Party)
- Suluh Indonesia (National Party of Indonesia)

=== Chinese ===
- Hua Chi Pao
- Keng Po (競報)
- Sin Po (新报, Chinese-language edition)

=== Dutch ===
- Bataviaasch Nieuwsblad
- De Indische Courant
- De Locomotief
- Het Vrije Woord
- Nieuws van den Dag voor Nederlandsch-Indië
- Soerabaijasch Handelsblad

=== English ===
- Bali Daily
- Indonesia Observer
- Jakarta Globe – ceased publication in 2015, continued online
- Times of Indonesia

== See also ==
- List of magazines in Indonesia
- Media of Indonesia
