= Mass media in Indonesia =

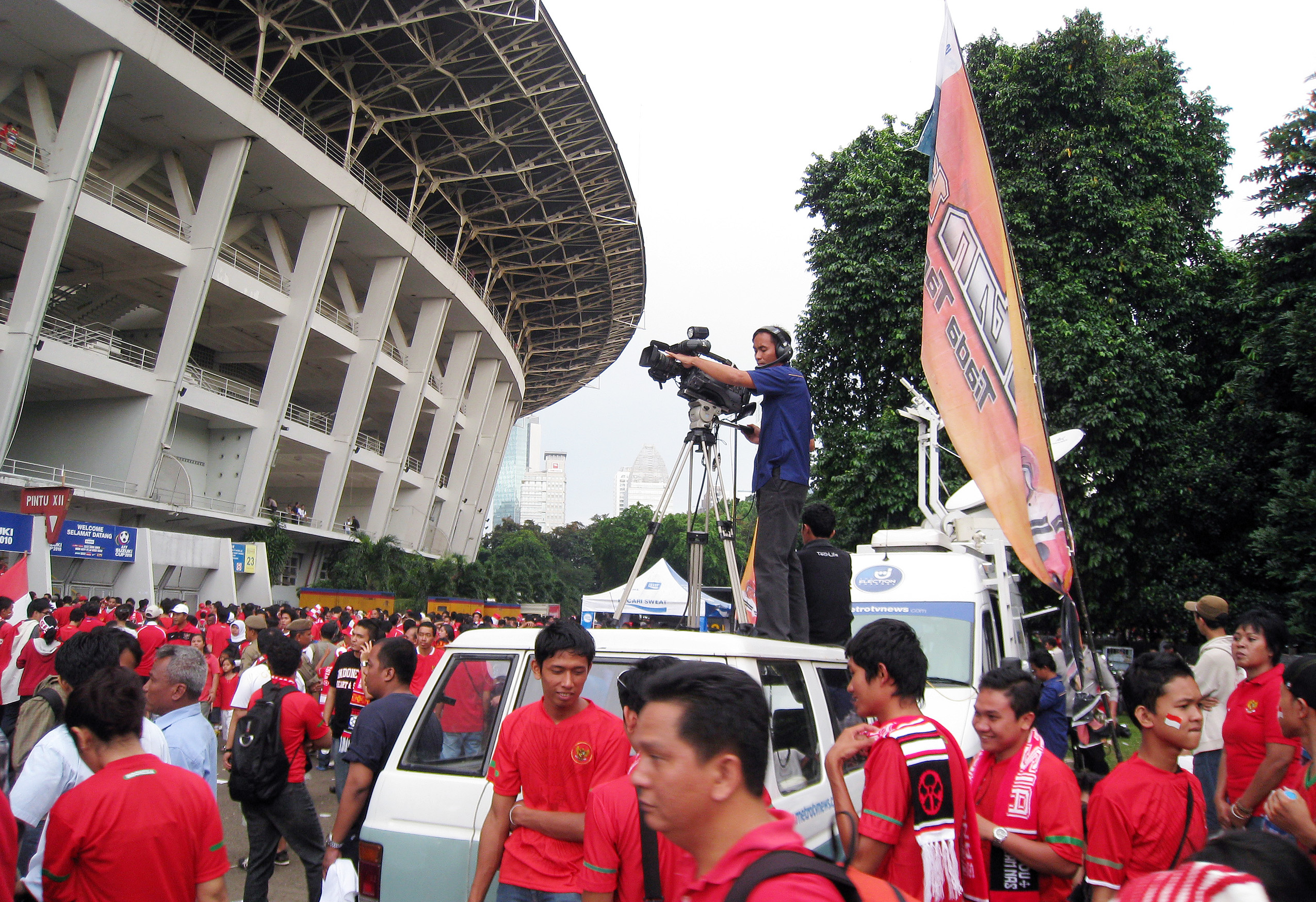
An Indonesian TV channel in Jakarta Stadium, reporting a football match.

The mass media in Indonesia consist of several different types of communications media: television, radio, cinema, newspapers, magazines, and Internet-based websites.

== History ==
Media freedom in Indonesia increased considerably after the end of President Suharto's rule, during which the Ministry of Information monitored and controlled domestic media and restricted foreign media. Long suppressed and harassed by the New Order, the Indonesian press is now among the freest and liveliest in Asia. The trend toward somewhat greater pluralism and openness had begun in the late New Order, when the regime allowed the founding of a number of new television and radio stations. The television stations all had to be Jakarta-based at first.

Many of the new television stations enjoyed penetration rates of around 70 to 75 percent of the population within a few years. Although the television licenses were all given to various Suharto family members, cronies, and other wealthy conglomerates, competition for advertising revenue and a large potential national audience meant that some of these stations were tempted to push the boundaries, especially regarding the ban on news programs other than those produced by the then state-run Televisi Republik Indonesia (TVRI).

These stations were very lucrative, so it became difficult for the regime to punish its own cronies by shutting down a station if it crossed the line by broadcasting independently produced news. Surya Citra Televisi (SCTV) and Rajawali Citra Televisi Indonesia (RCTI) news programs, in particular, were very popular with viewers across the country as an alternative, albeit still relatively tame, to the stultifying TVRI.

In 2003 the authorities reported that more than 2,000 illegal TV and radio stations were broadcasting across the country. The government urged them to apply for licenses, or face closure.

== News media ==
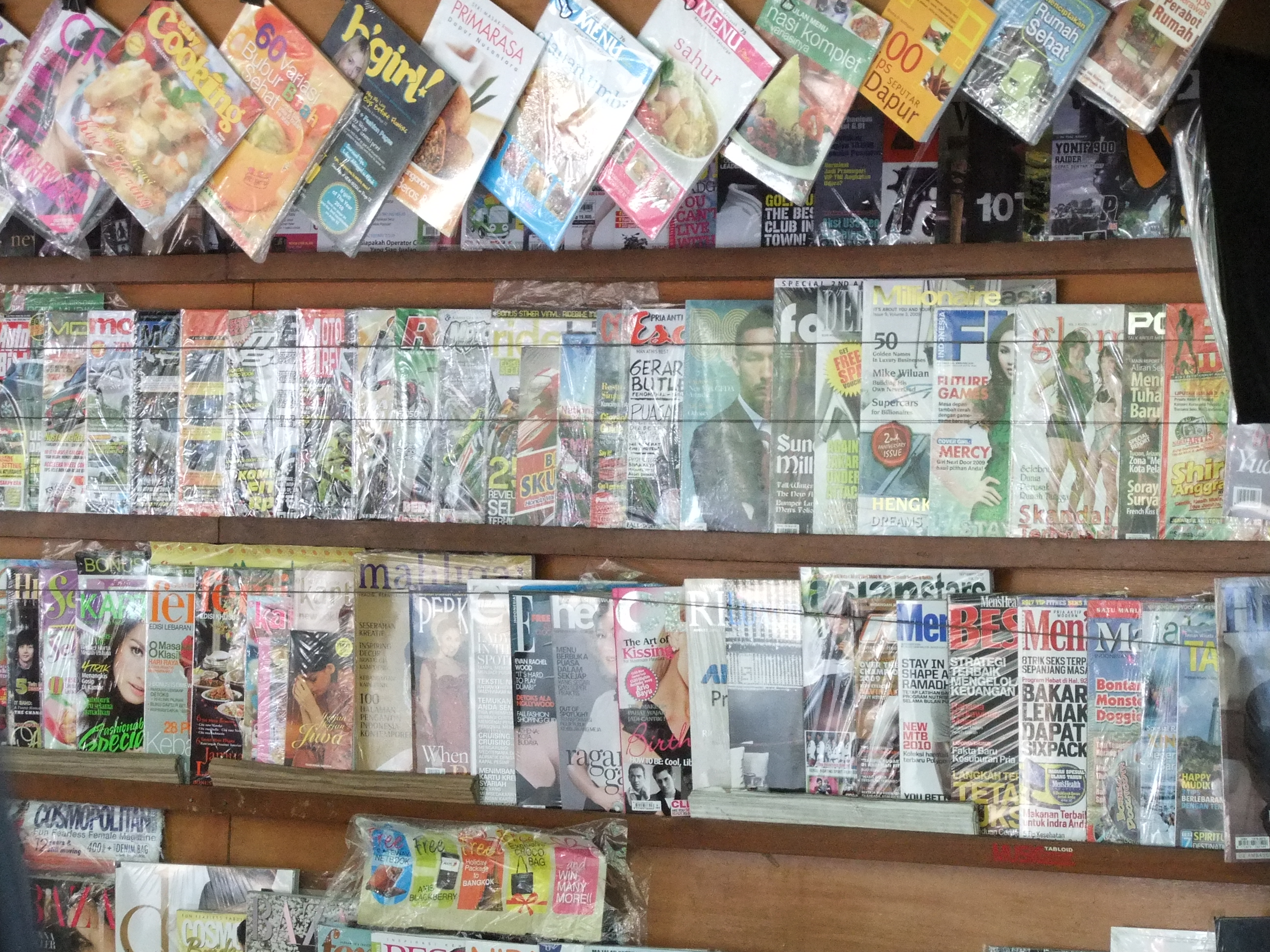
Printed mass media, such as magazines in Indonesian news stand.

The number of printed publications has increased significantly since 1998. There are hundreds of new magazines, newspapers, and tabloids. More than 50 principal daily newspapers are published throughout the archipelago, the majority in Java. Those with the largest readership are Kompas (Jakarta), circulation of 523,000; Suara Merdeka (Semarang), circulation of 200,000; Berita Buana (Jakarta), circulation of 150,000; Pikiran Rakyat (Bandung), circulation of 150,000; and Sinar Indonesia Baru (Medan), also with a circulation of 150,000.

The largest English-language dailies, both published in Jakarta with print runs of 40,000, are the Jakarta Post and the Jakarta Globe. As of 2003, newspapers have a penetration rate of 8.6 percent. The principal weekly news magazines are Tempo, which also produces an English-language edition, and Gatra. All of these newspapers and magazines have online editions as well.

Several leading Indonesian newspaper such as Kompas can be obtained at digital newspaper printing services in several foreign countries. Some large newspapers also use remote digital printing to solve the distribution problems in remote areas in Indonesia.

ANTARA is the national news agency of Indonesia. Formerly under the Department of Information, it is currently organized as a statutory corporation under the Ministry of State Owned Enterprises.

The National Press Monument in Surakarta, Central Java has a collection of over a million newspapers and magazines, as well as a variety of exhibitions and artefacts related to the history of the press in Indonesia.

== Radio ==
Before the reform, radio was regulated by the government through Directorate General of Radio, Television, and Film of the Department of Information. Radio is currently regulated by the independent Indonesian Broadcasting Commission (KPI) for content matters as well as the Ministry of Communication and Information Technology for frequency matters. There are about 3,000 live radio stations throughout Indonesia, but only a few broadcast nationally.

Examples include Sonora and Prambors in the nation's capital, Radio Istara in Surabaya, Swaragama in Yogyakarta, and Global FM Bali in Denpasar. Private radio stations carry their own news bulletins and foreign broadcasters can supply programmes.

Radio Republik Indonesia (RRI) is the public radio network of Indonesia. It has a national news network, as well as regional stations in major cities throughout the country. Voice of Indonesia is its division for overseas broadcasting.

There are now also several digital radio stations in Jakarta and Surabaya, based on Digital Audio Broadcasting (DAB) and Hybrid HD-Radio (IBOC). There are also several Indonesian radio stations that stream live on the internet.

== Television ==
Like the radio, before the reform era television broadcasting was also regulated by the government through Directorate General of Radio, Television, and Film of the Department of Information, but currently regulated by the KPI for content matters as well as the Ministry of Communication and Information Technology for frequency matters. Television and radio traditionally have been dominated by government networks, but private commercial channels have been emerging since the introduction of RCTI in the Jakarta area in 1988. By early in the new century, the improved communications system had brought television signals to every village in the country, and most Indonesians could choose from 11 channels.

In addition to the public broadcaster TVRI, which operated three national channels, there were dozens of national private channels, the best known are Indosiar, RCTI, SCTV, Metro TV, and Trans7. Some channels have a specific orientation, for instance, Global TV, which initially offered broadcasts from MTV Indonesia, and MNCTV (formerly Indonesian Educational Television, or TPI) which originally carried only educational programming but expanded into quiz programs, sports, reality shows, and other popular entertainment. There were also 54 local television stations in 2009, such as Bali TV in Bali, Jak TV in Jakarta, and Pacific TV (now Kompas TV Manado) in Manado.

== Internet ==
In 2016, 88 million Indonesians used the Internet, of which 93% used smartphones, 5% tablets and 11% computers. Broadband reached 8% of the households.

== Media freedom ==
Since the transition to democracy, thousands of new print publications and radio stations have started up across the country, and more television broadcasters, including regional stations, have licenses. The government cannot revoke these publishing and broadcasting licenses based on what the outlets write and say. President Abdurrahman Wahid further weakened the government's ability to control the media when he abolished the Ministry of Information at the outset of his administration.

The censorship board for motion pictures (Film Censorship Board, Lembaga Sensor Film) remained in existence, however, mainly to police "public morality" (nudity, sexuality) rather than political statements, and President Megawati Sukarnoputri reestablished the information-matter ministry into Ministry of Communication and Informatics on her ascension to power.

In the absence of significant government repression, spurious defamation lawsuits by private individuals have become the principal means of stifling media scrutiny. The most prominent of these cases involved businessman Tomy Winata, who sued Tempo editor-in-chief Bambang Harymurti. Harymurti was convicted and given a one-year prison sentence, which the Supreme Court overturned.

As of 2018, foreign journalists still require permission from the government to visit Papua.

== See also ==
- Public broadcasting in Indonesia
- Cinema of Indonesia
