= Shoeb Kagda =

Indonesian journalist and businessman

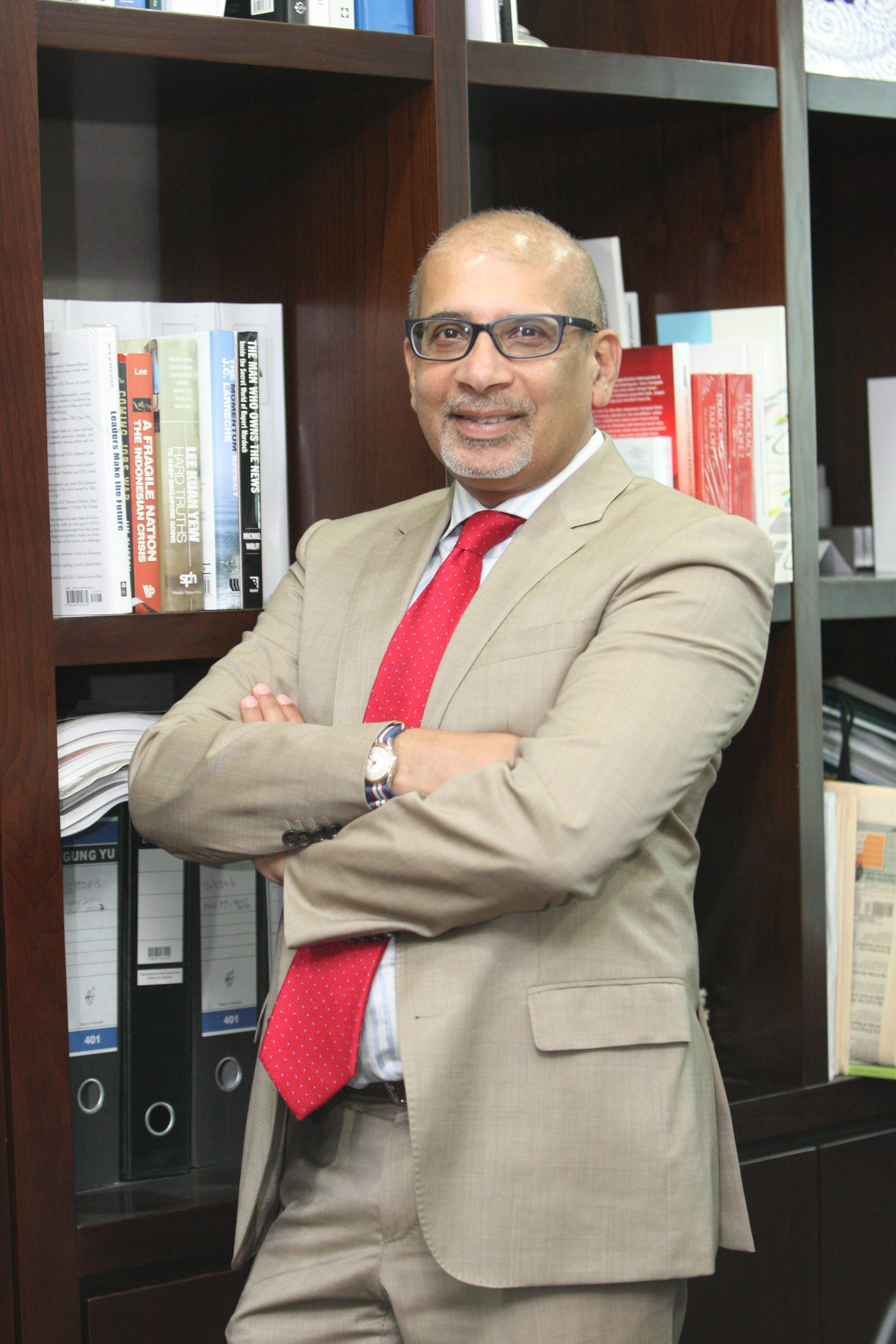
Shoeb Kagda

Shoeb Kagda is an Indonesian journalist and businessman. Kagda completed his BA degree at Indiana University, in Bloomington, United States, graduating with a double major in journalism and political science.

== Journalism career ==
He started his career in economic journalism in 1988 as a reporter for the Singapore Business Times. He moved to Jakarta in 1998 to cover the Asian financial crisis during which time he wrote on the political and economic climate of Indonesia.

== Publishing ==
In 2007, he launched Globe Asia, which annually publishes the 150 Richest Indonesians and the 100 Top Companies lists. The magazine today has a circulation of 60,000.

== Media business ==
After serving as the group editor in chief for BeritaSatu Media Holdings (which includes Globe Asia, the Jakarta Globe, Investor Daily) for three years, Kagda started a media and political consulting firm, Synthesis Indonesia, in 2013.

== Forum ==
In 2014, he established the Indonesia Economic Forum, a forum in which businesses, economists and government officials can discuss Indonesian economic affairs.
