= Sie Hian Ling =

Sie Hian Ling (d. c. 1928), who sometimes signed his works H.L. Sie, was a Peranakan Chinese journalist from Semarang, Dutch East Indies (now Indonesia). He was one of the first Chinese journalists in the Indies and an early translator of Chinese novels.

== Biography ==
Earlier in his career, he worked for the Malay language newspaper Slompret Melajoe as well as Tamboer Melajoe, which he became editor of in around 1888. Apparently a Chinese editor was still unusual at that time as some Eurasian editors expressed unhappiness that the position had not been given to one of them, as was customary. The paper mostly reprinted news from overseas Chinese and European papers, and the paper did not do well and closed in 1889. After that he was also editor of other papers, such as Pembrita Semarang and later Bintang Semarang. In around 1899 or 1900 he founded his own paper Sinar Djawa (which after 1917 became a mouthpiece for the Communist Party of Indonesia).

In 1902, he was also made an official interpreter of Chinese at the Dutch court (Raad van Justitie) in Semarang and in this capacity, in 1904, he was made a Luitenant der Chinezen on an honorary basis by the Dutch East Indies government. He was also apparently a Christian, somewhat unusually for Peranakan Chinese at the time. After 1910, he started writing fictionalized novels based on current events (a popular genre of literature among Chinese Indonesians at the time). In 1913, he sold his newspaper Sinar Djawa to the early Indonesian nationalist organization Sarekat Islam.

He died in Semarang in 1928.
