= Bali Post Media Group =

Indonesian daily newspaper

- Pengemban Pengamal Pancasila (Bearer [and] Practitioner of Pancasila)
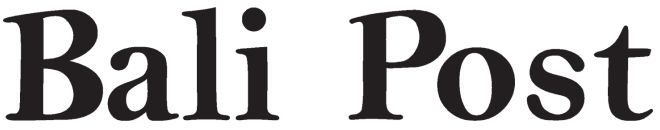
- Type: Daily newspaper
- Format: Broadsheet
- Owner: Bali Post Media Group
- Founder: Ketut Nadha
- Publisher: Satria Naradha
- Founded: 16 August 1948; 77 years ago
- Language: Indonesian
- Headquarters: Denpasar, Bali
- City: Denpasar
- Country: Indonesia
- Website: www.balipost.com

Bali Post Media Group (BPMG) is an Indonesian media conglomerate founded by Ketut Nadha in 1948. Bali Post Media Group is said to be the largest media holder in Bali, Indonesia. It is led by ABG Satria Naradha, the son of Ketut Nadha, and has diversified businesses and interests in the Bali media industry. BPMG businesses include broadcast media, print media, online media, and a variety of other businesses.

== History ==
=== Early years (1942-1948) ===
During WWII, when Imperial Japan occupied Indonesia, the Japanese took control of information and news media agencies in Indonesia. As a result, newspaper names and management changed, many of which had existed since the Dutch colonial era in Indonesia.

Japanese occupiers created new newspapers in several cities in Indonesia, including: Kita Sumatera Shimbun (Palembang), Lampung Shimbun (Lampung), Sinar Matahari (Ambon), and Bali Shimbun (Bali). Bali Shimbun Newspaper was first published on 8 March 1944. The company recruited local journalists as members of the editorial team.

Bali Shimbun ceased its publication following Japan's Pacific surrender in August 1945. In 1946, one of the editorial team members from Bali Shimbun Newspaper, Ketut Nadha, established a library and bookstore to preserve and produce articles to document the history of Indonesia's independence movement. Two years later, on 16 August 1948, Ketut Nadha published this work in magazine format under the title Suara Indonesia, with the help of two of his colleagues, I Gusti Putu and Made Arka Sarya Udaya.

=== Name Changes (1965-1972) ===
In 1965, Suara Indonesia was affiliated with Partai Nasionalis Indonesia (PNI), the most significant political party in Bali at that time. Suara Indonesia changed to Suluh Indonesia Edisi Bali in 1966. One year later, Suluh Indonesia changed to Suluh Marhaen and would remain under that name from 1966 to May 1971. Then, in 1972 Suluh Marhaen changed to its current name: Bali Post Media Group.

=== Development (1972-Present) ===
Starting in 1972, the BPMG established a daily publication schedule with a license from the PT Bali Press (0359/PER/SK/DIR PP/SIT/71, dated 2 September 1971). The media group also became part of the press company union, Serikat Penerbit Surat Kabar. At this point, BPMG defined its official leadership: Ketut Nadha (General Manager), Raka Wiratma (Chief Editor), and Widminarko (Vice Chief Editor).

The first publication of the newspaper Bali Post included the "Pengemban Pengamal Pancasila." At first, the paper only published four pages, the industry standard for newspaper magazines. From 1985 to 1988, the estimated circulation range of Bali Post was between 19,200 and 24,500 copies per day. In 1989, circulation numbers had climbed to around 39,000 copies per day.

The collapse of the New Order, entering the Reformation Era, brought the emergence of Undang-Undang Pokok Pers No. 40 Tahun 1999. This law allowed and enabled people to establish their own publishing companies. Press publications became more various and included daily newspapers, weekly tabloids or magazines, and monthly press publications. Some BPMG print media from that period continues to be published, including Bali Post, Denpost, and Bisnis Bali.

In 1999, BPMG expanded from solely print media into electronic publication. The first BPMG broadcast media established was Global Radio FM on 30 May 1999, under a subsidiary company of PT Radio Swara Kinijani.

The founder of BPMG, Ketut Nadha, died on 5 January 2001. Nadha's only son, ABG Satria Naradha, led BPMG, serving as its current Vice Chief Editor and the Director of Bali Post Corporation. During his decade of leadership, Naradha developed a media conglomeration to reach more diverse age groups.

BPMG established Bali TV, which began officially airing on 26 May 2002, under PT Bali Ranadha Televisi. In 2007, the Bali Post editorial office moved to a building in Jalan Kebo Iwo No. 63 A, Denpasar. The building is known as the Ketut Nadha Press Building in dedication to Ketut Nadha.

In 2008, BPMG opened their online news portal at www.balipost.co.id.

== Print Media ==
=== Newspaper ===
BPMG publishes various daily news segments, including: Bali Post, Denpost, Bisnis Bali, Suara NTB, Suluh Indonesia and Bisnis Jakarta. Bali Post remains the oldest newspaper in BPMG's publication and is still its main newspaper. Bali Post publications feature articles that comment on politics, economy, sports, entertainment, and public opinion. Denpost covers crime news, while Bisnis Bali and Bisnis Jakarta focus on economy and business. Suara NTB is published in Mataram, and Bisnis Jakarta is published in Jakarta. Suluh Indonesia was previously featured as an insert in Bisnis Jakarta newspaper, but it is now sold separately. Newspapers of BPMG are the following:

- Bali Post
- Denpasar Post (Denpost)
- Bisnis Bali
- Bisnis Jakarta
- Suara NTB
- International Bali Post (English edition of Bali Post)
- Bisnis Bandung
- Bisnis Surabaya

=== Tabloid ===
Tabloids published by BPMG include several segments. In the children's segment, BPMG published Lintang. This tabloid is published weekly and inserted in Bali Post Minggu. Wiyata Mandala Tabloid is published twice a month. This tabloid is for adolescents. The reporters are not only daily journalists of Bali Post but including student reporters from schools in Bali. BPMG published Tokoh Tabloid once a week in the segment of women and families. While in the tourism segment, BPMG published weekly English tabloids, Bali Travel News. Tabloids of BPMG are the following:

- Lintang
- Wiyata Mandala
- Tokoh
- Bali Travel News

== Broadcast media ==
=== Television ===
Beginning on 26 May 2002, BPMG entered the world of television by launching Bali TV, a television group that provides cultural content and local arts empowerment in Indonesia. Its broadcast range covers Bali, most of West Nusa Tenggara, and east Java. Bali TV grew by developing television station networking followed by several local television stations in various regions in Indonesia. TV stations of BPMG are the following:

- Bali TV
- Bandung TV
- Jogja TV
- Semarang TV
- Sriwijaya TV
- Aceh TV
- Sumut TV
- Surabaya TV

=== Radio ===
Global Radio Kinijani is the first established radio of BPMG. The variety of programs on Global Radio Kinijani is a mostly interactive dialogue with the audience about a particular topic, including discussions related to politics, economics, culture, and public service. The success of Global Radio Kinijani was followed by the establishment of BPMG radio in other areas of Bali, such as Radio Suara Besakih in Karangasem, Radio Genta FM in Denpasar, Radio Singaraja FM in Singaraja, Radio Fajar FM and Suara Banyuwangi in Banyuwangi, Radio Lombok FM in Mataram Nusa Tenggara Barat, Negara FM in Jembrana, and two other radios in Yogyakarta. In addition, some of these entertainment stations take song requests from audience members. BPMG radio stations include the following:

- Global Kini Jani
- Genta FM
- Global FM
- Lombok FM
- Fajar FM
- Suara Besakih
- Singaraja FM
- Negara FM
- Suara Banyuwangi
- Bali Radio
- Suara Denpasar
- Radio Nasional Denpasar
- Radio Televisi Denpasar
- Perusahaan Siaran Denpasar

== Other Business ==
Beyond engaging in Print and Broadcast Media, BPMG also has other subsidiaries. There are Bali Mart in Jl. Imam Bonjol Denpasar, Koperasi Krama Bali, and a Souvenir center in Kuta, Bali.

== Criticism and Controversies ==
=== Advertising Issues ===
Bali Post claimed to circulate 100,000 copies per day in the advertising offers. However, on 20 August 2003, SWA magazine countered that statement, attesting that Bali Post's daily circulation was 90,000 copies or Rp 64.8 billion per year. Meanwhile, according to research conducted by Santra in 2006, the daily circulation of Bali Post was 87,500 copies. This circulation was spread across the districts and cities in Bali, Jakarta, Surabaya, Mataram, and Kupang.

=== Media Bias ===
As the most prominent media in Bali, BPMG has mastered almost all media segments. In the electronic media, BPMG manages Bali TV, which reaches the entire region of Bali, and five radio stations that reach the whole area. Therefore, this conglomeration is seen as a monopoly of public opinion. On Thursday, 2 May 2013, several groups rallied to express their anger about the biased coverage of Bali Post Media Group within their publications, especially in Bali TV and the daily newspaper, Bali Post. Hundreds of Bali citizens and nine Hindu priests held a ritual, "Pralina," that featured the symbolic cremation of copies of the Bali Post newspaper in front of the Bali Post office. The protestors believed that Bali Post no longer stood as an ideal mass media representation. Later on, from 8 May to 11 May 2013, the Indonesian Broadcasting Commission (KPI) Bali branch placed a ban on Seputar Bali news program after receiving public complaints about one-sided coverage of a gubernatorial election and the incumbent candidates. Bali Post was also accused of violating law no 32/2002 on Broadcasting Rules and Standards, according to the Jakarta Post.
