= Student Hidjo =

Book by Marco Kartodikromo

Student Hijo
- Cover of 2002 Bentang edition
- Author: Marco Kartodikromo
- Language: Malay
- Genre: Novel
- Publisher: Sinar Hindia (serial); Masman & Stroink (book)
- Publication date: 1918 (serial); 1919 (book)
- Publication place: Dutch East Indies
- Media type: Print (Serial, hardback, & paperback)
- Pages: 132
- OCLC: 63225475

Student Hidjo (Perfected spelling Student Hijo, both meaning Student Green) is a 1918 novel by Marco Kartodikromo. Originally published as a serial in the newspaper Sinar Hindia, it was republished in book form in 1919 by Masman & Stroink.

Written while Kartodikromo was in prison, Student Hidjo tells the story of Hidjo, a Javanese student sent to the Netherlands to study but eventually falls for a Dutchwoman. An intersecting plotline, which unfolds parallel to the main story, follows Dutch administrator Willem Walter in his romantic life. Written in Malay, the novel was one of several by Javanese authors which helped popularise the word "saya" as a first-person personal pronoun.

Described by Kartodikromo as an extended simile, Student Hidjo has been noted as depicting a new Indonesian youth culture which has adopted Western cultural and lingual facets. Traditional Javanese and Dutch cultural values are contrasted; from this contrast, Kartodikromo advocates a view that the two are incompatible. This includes love, which is described in the novel as something only those with a Dutch education would attempt to find; the traditional view being that marriage is to be used for social mobility.

== Background ==
Student Hidjo was written by Marco Kartodikromo, a journalist from Blora who began his career in Bandung and was strongly opposed to the policies of the Dutch East Indies government. For several years he worked as an editor at the Surakarta-based newspaper Doenia Bergerak; the city later served as the novel's setting. He spent five months in the Netherlands, from late 1916 to early 1917; upon his return, he was arrested by the Dutch governmental authorities for "sowing hatred" and sentenced to a year in prison in Weltevreden, Batavia (now Sawah Besar, Jakarta). It was while in prison that Kartodikromo wrote Student Hidjo.

In the early 20th century, the introduction of Western technology and culture was leading to the fragmentation of the traditional Javanese lifestyle. Meanwhile, the Dutch Ethical Policy, which guaranteed certain rights and freedoms – such as the right to education and some press freedoms – was leading to social unrest. The tighter controls put on the press after 1906 led to Student Hidjo being published with the text "not to be quoted" ("tak boleh dikoetip") on the cover.

== Plot ==
Hidjo is a young man from Surakarta, Central Java, who is engaged to Biroe, in accordance with his father's wishes. His father, a merchant named Raden Potronojo, orders Hidjo to go to the Netherlands and attend university; this is hoped to give the family greater status, as generally only priyayi (noble) families send their children abroad for schooling. Meanwhile, Dutch administrator Willem Walter, who views the Javanese positively, is engaged to a Dutch woman named Jet Roos; Roos is pregnant with his child.

In the Netherlands, Hidjo stays with a local family and enjoys the beauty of the Netherlands. The family's daughter, Betje, finds him intriguing because of his ethnicity. Although Hidjo initially receives her coldly, the two later become romantically and sexually involved. In Surakarta, Walter becomes attracted to Biroe and breaks off his engagement with Roos, who in turn aborts their child. This, and Biroe's rejection, leads him to return to the Netherlands, where he and Hidjo meet.

Hidjo, who has become increasingly distracted from his studies by his relationship with Betje, is recalled to the Indies by his family. He ends his relationship with the Dutchwoman, paying her his savings to make amends for doing so. When Hidjo returns to Surakarta, he marries Woengoe – who originates from a higher-class family than Biroe. Two years later, Hidjo has become district attorney of Djarak. Meanwhile, Walter has married Betje and returned to Surakarta to become assistant resident. Biroe marries Woengoe's brother Wardojo, who has become regent of the area. Roos marries the area's administrator, Boeren.

== Style ==
Student Hidjo was written in Malay. When the novel was written, and indeed for numerous years afterwards, the Dutch colonial government was attempting to standardise Malay; the standardised form has been described by Hendrik Maier, a lecturer at Leiden University, as stilted. However, Kartodikromo did not attempt to follow these standards. According to Meier, unlike writers who used standardised Malay such as Armijn Pane and Haji Abdul Malik Karim Amrullah in a "sad" manner, the language in Student Hidjo showed only "the enjoyment, the excitement, the thrill" of the writer, who "bubbled with anger".

Tsuyoshi Kato, a Japanese scholar of Indonesian literature, notes that Kartodikromo, like other Javanese authors, preferred to use the term "saya" when writing in the first-person, as opposed to Minangkabau writers who preferred "hamba". He writes that "saya" was preferred over a Javanese word due to first person pronouns having highly different levels of politeness in that language. He writes that through works such as Student Hidjo and Rasa Merdika (A Sense of Freedom; 1924; by Soemantri), Javanese writers popularised the term; he describes "saya" as more active than "hamba" but more "contemplative and self-reflective" than the Javanese ngoko (crude) pronoun "aku".

== Themes ==
Maier writes that the names of the main characters imply Student Hidjo should be read allegorically, with the names Hidjo (green), Woengoe (violet), and Biroe (blue) showing an interconnection between the characters. Kartodikromo described it as an extended simile.

The novel depicts a younger generation of Indonesians (kaoem moeda) as being "those who understand Dutch". (Note: Original: "... jang mengerti Bahasa Belanda.") Maier writes that this understanding is not limited to the language used, but also actions; this includes holding hands in public and drinking lemonade, activities which traditional Indonesian society does not involve. Student Hidjo also contrasts Dutch and Javanese peoples. Maier finds that, through its alternating events, the novel shows that the Dutch and Javanese are incompatible; Maeir sums it up as "Javanese do not feel at ease in Holland, [and] Dutch do not feel at ease in Java." According to Maier, the novel views the gap between the two cultures as "unbridgeable".

Maier writes that the novel includes themes of love, with Hidjo's love for Woengoe, Betje, and Biroe paralleling that of Walter's love for Roos, Woengoe, and Betje. He also notes that there is a theme of social mobility, where Hidjo's relationships with noble women are fostered by his merchant father to grant the family a greater social position; bride prices also feature prominently, showing that one can become a noble through marriage if one has enough money. He notes that, towards the end of the novel, love is described as something only those with a Dutch education would attempt to find, as the social-financial meaning of marriage remains predominant among the traditional Javanese. The characters, despite not all marrying for love, are happy with their eventual partners and have a comfortable life.

== Release and reception ==
Student Hidjo was first published in 1918 as a serial in the Semarang-based daily Sinar Hindia, which Kartodikromo edited. The story was then collected in a book format and published by Masman & Stroink, a Semarang-based company, in 1919. When it was published, politically themed works were limited to smaller publishers. Works published by Balai Pustaka, the state-owned publisher of the Dutch East Indies, tended to be apolitical.

Kato writes that the novel is "unremarkable in terms of radical activism", but unrivaled in its imagination when compared to Sitti Nurbaya (1922; Marah Rusli), Salah Asuhan (Wrong Upbringing; 1927; Abdoel Moeis), and Rasa Merdika.

It was translated into English as A Student Named Hijo by Paul Tickell in 2015.
