= Bisnis Indonesia =

Indonesian daily business newspaper

- Navigasi Bisnis Terpercaya (Reliable Business Navigation)
- Type: Daily newspaper
- Format: Broadsheet
- Owner: PT Jurnalindo Aksara Grafika (Bisnis Indonesia Group)
- Founder(s): Sukamdani Sahid Gitosardjono; Ciputra; Anthony Salim; Eric FH Samola
- Founded: December 14, 1985; 40 years ago
- Language: Indonesian
- Headquarters: Wisma Bisnis Indonesia; Jalan K.H. Mas Mansyur Kav. 12A; Karet Tengsin, Tanah Abang, Central Jakarta
- City: Jakarta
- Country: Indonesia
- Sister newspapers: Solopos; Harian Jogja; Indonesia Shang Bao; Monitor Depok
- Website: www.bisnis.com

Bisnis Indonesia (lit. 'Indonesian Business') is a daily business newspaper published in Jakarta, Indonesia. It is published by PT Jurnalindo Aksara Grafika, a subsidiary of Bisnis Indonesia Group originally founded by three conglomerate businessmen in Indonesia: Sukamdani Sahid Gitosardjono (Sahid Group), Ciputra (Ciputra Group), Anthony Salim (Salim Group), and media veteran Eric FH Samola. The first business newspaper in the country, its first edition was published on December 14, 1985.

Bisnis Indonesia primarily covers Indonesian financial and business news and related issues. The paper also provides news content for international news agencies including Japan-based NewsNet Asia, Factiva, ISI Emerging Markets, Chinese news agency Xinhua, and Bloomberg.

== History ==
Bisnis Indonesia opened its first office in a former Singer's sewing machine service center at Jalan Kramat V/8, Central Jakarta. The newspaper gained its momentum from the rise of the stock market in 1987 and a new policy in banking known as Paket Oktober (Pakto) 1988. Bisnis Indonesia shifted their coverage to focus on micro-economics and business news at a time when most competitors were reporting heavily on macro-economics issue. This strategy proved fruitful as the stock exchange authority ordered all public listed companies to publish their financial reports and corporate actions.
