= Solopos =

Indonesian daily newspaper published in Surakarta

- Panduan Informasi Terpercaya (Trusted Information Guide)
- Type: Daily newspaper
- Owner: PT Aksara Solopos (Bisnis Indonesia Group)
- Founded: 1997
- Language: Indonesian
- Headquarters: Surakarta, Central Java
- City: Surakarta
- Country: Indonesia
- Sister newspapers: Bisnis Indonesia; Harian Jogja; Indonesia Shang Bao; Monitor Depok
- Website: www.solopos.com

Solopos is an Indonesian daily newspaper published in the city of Surakarta, Central Java. First published in September 1997, it is published by PT. Aksara Solopos (which is mostly owned by the business daily Bisnis Indonesia). The daily is known as the major newspaper in the city and surrounding areas.
