= Bali TV =

- Denpasar, Bali; Indonesia
- Channels: Digital: 30 UHF; Virtual: 7

Programming
- Affiliations: Indonesia Network

Ownership
- Owner: Bali Post Media Group
- Operator: PT Bali Ranadha Televisi
- Sister stations: Aceh TV; Bandung TV; Jogja TV; Semarang TV; Sriwijaya TV; Sumut TV; Surabaya TV

History
- First air date: 26 May 2002
- Former channel numbers: 39 UHF (analog); 37 UHF (analog); 49 UHF (analog); 51 UHF (analog, Buleleng)

Technical information
- Licensing authority: Kementerian Komunikasi dan Informatika Republik Indonesia

Links
- Website: www.balitv.tv

Bali TV
- Country: Indonesia
- Headquarters: Pers Bali K. Nadha Building, Jl. Kebo Iwa 63 A Denpasar, Bali

Programming
- Languages: Indonesian, Balinese

Availability

Streaming media
- IndiHome TV: Watch live (IndiHome customers only)

Bali TV first logo (2002-2012)

Bali TV is a privately owned Indonesian television station that belongs to Bali Post Media Group, and covers the island of Bali.

The station became well known for regularly broadcasting in the Balinese language. Some examples include the broadcast of Balinese songs and ceremonies. The station also broadcasts in the Indonesian language.

== Presenters ==
- Oka Permadi
- Arna Suputra
- Aura Gizela
- Dwi Vera
- Jagat Raya

== Controversies ==
=== Ban on Seputar Bali ===
From 8 to 11 May 2013, the Seputar Bali news programme was banned from airing by Indonesian Broadcasting Commission Bali Branch because of its biased coverage of the gubernatorial election and the candidates.

== See also ==
- List of television stations in Indonesia
- Media of Indonesia
