= Suara Karya =

Former newspaper in Indonesia

- Suara Rakyat Membangun (Voice of the Developing People)
- Type: Online newspaper
- Founder: Golkar
- Founded: 11 March 1971
- Ceased publication: 2 May 2016 (print)
- Political alignment: Traditionally pro-Golkar and Suharto (Centre-right)
- Language: Indonesian
- City: Jakarta
- Country: Indonesia
- ISSN: 0215-3130
- OCLC number: 34583137
- Website: www.suarakarya.id

Suara Karya (lit. 'Voice of Work') is an online-only daily newspaper published in Indonesia. Established in 1971 to assist Golkar in winning that year's legislative election, it became required reading for all civil servants and the voice of Golkar. After its circulation increased from 55,700 in 1971 to 300,000 in 1998, the fall of Suharto's dictatorship caused circulation to plummet to 3,000. As of 2005, it was attempting rebranding to present cleaner, less biased news. It ceased print publication in 2016, although is still available online.

== History ==
Former masthead of Suara Karya

=== New Order (1971–1998) ===
The first issue of Suara Karya was published on 11 March 1971 by the Suara Karya Foundation under direction of Golkar (Functional Group), prior to the July legislative election to assist the group. It took three days of preparation and Rp 50 million (at the time US$130,000) in start-up costs for the newspaper to be established. Its chief executive was Sumiskun, and the head editor was Jamal Ali. Other members of the editorial staff included Syamsul Bisri, Rahman Tolleng, Sayuti Melik, David Napitupulu, and Cosmas Batubara.

For the first edition, 25,000 four-page copies were printed and sold at Rp. 10 each. A quarter of the front page was dedicated to a congratulatory note from President Suharto, while the main story was "Presiden Jawab Pertanyaan-pertanyaan Sekitar Supersemar" ("President Answers Questions regarding Supersemar"), which covered Suharto's explanation of Supersemar and offered support for it. It also provided the paper's mission statement, which has been described as being "explicit that Suara Karya wanted to be a partisan paper". (Note: Original: "... memang ingin menjadikan dirinya sebagai koran partisan ...")

Suara Karya's influence resulted in Golkar winning their first election and securing their political power. The newspaper afterwards became required reading for all government employees. It soon came into direct competition with Kompas, which became its biggest competitor.

From 1971 to 1988, total circulation (shown in blue) grew to 112,312 copies

With the support of Golkar, circulation expanded rapidly. By 1972, Suara Karya was selling 57,400 copies a day, 90.6% to the general public. During the succeeding years circulation varied, sometimes rising, sometimes falling drastically. By 1987, circulation had reached 124,079. At that time, Suara Karya employed 81 reporters, giving a ratio of one reporter for every 1,500 copies sold. It reached a circulation of 300,000 by 1998 and was considered the voice of Golkar Most of the subscribers were civil servants, who were required to do so by Golkar.

In 1983, together with Kompas, Suara Pembaruan, and Tempo, Suara Karya founded the Jakarta Post. In 1994, Suara Karya was estimated to own a 35% share of the company, making it the largest shareholder.

In 1989, Suara Karya received light sanctions from the Ministry of Information after running an article on the Sultan of Brunei. The article was considered likely to cause the Sultan emotional distress.

=== Since 1998 ===
When Suharto was forced to resign from office in 1998, Suara Karya's circulation dropped sharply from 300,000 to 3,000. After Golkar received the largest number of votes in the 2004 legislative election, it attempted a revamp of the newspaper and vowed not to promote the party's political interests through the daily; Dirk Tomsa considers their efforts unsuccessful, as Suara Karya was still often used as a way for Golkar members to express their opinions. As of 2005, Golkar claimed a circulation of 80,000.

Suara Karya ceased print publication in 2016, although is still available online.

== Function ==
Rizal Mallarangeng notes that Suara Karya's original function was to help establish strong public support for Golkar; the paper is described as being "the paper of Golkar and the New Order". (Note: Original: "... korannya Golkar dan Orde Baru.") Meanwhile, Syamsul Bisri considered Suara Karya a form of social control, dedicated towards "an idea ... the return to pure form of Pancasila and the 1945 Constitution". (Note: Original: "... kepada ide. ... pemurnian kembali Pancasila dan UUD 1945.")
