= Minggu Pagi =

Indonesian weekly newspaper

- Mingguan Enteng Berisi ('Light, Full-content Weekly')
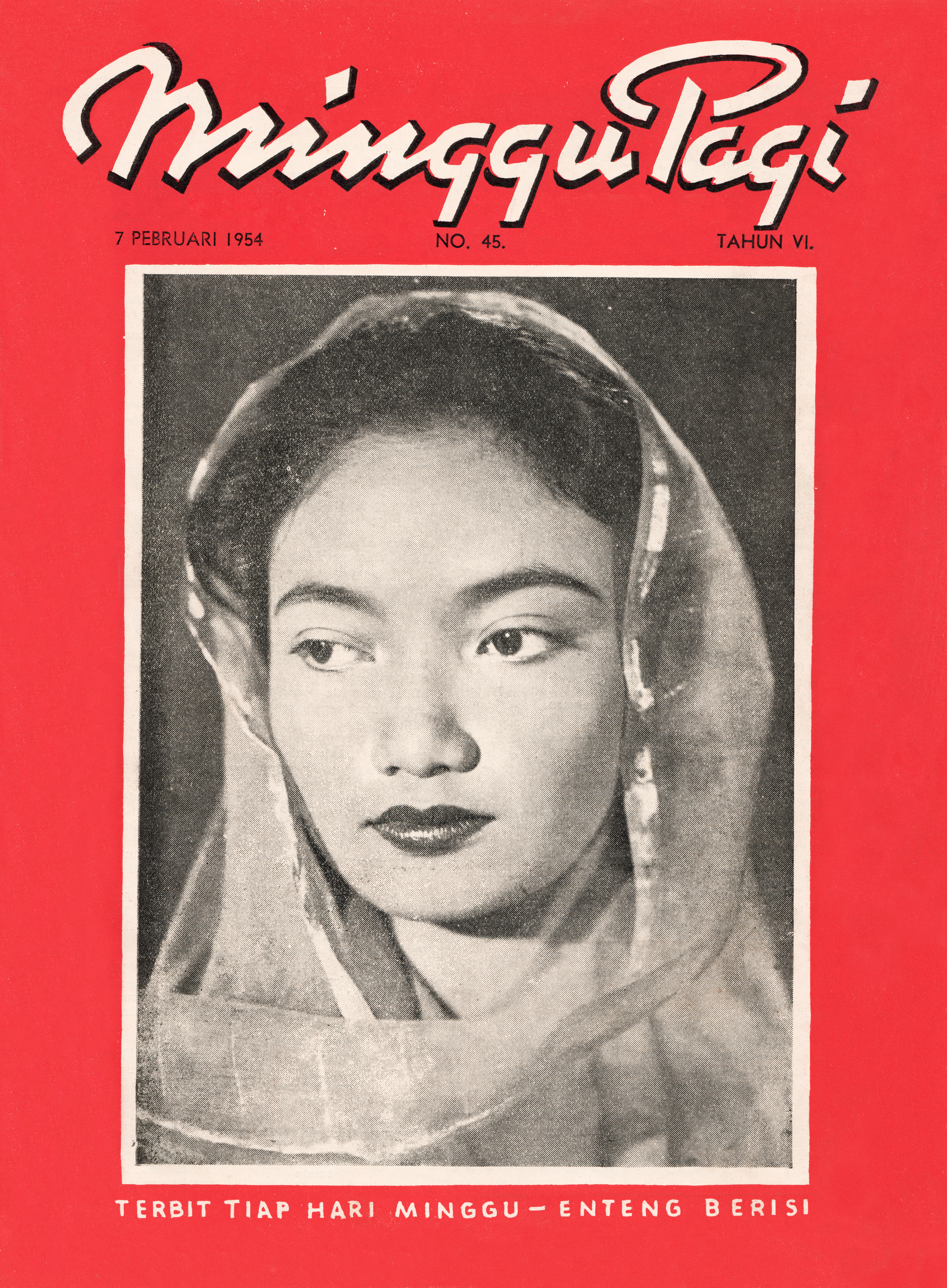
- Cover of the Minggu Pagi magazine featuring actress Lies Noor, 7 February 1954
- Format: Tabloid
- Owner: PT. BP Kedaulatan Rakyat
- Founded: December 1948; 77 years ago
- Language: Indonesian
- Headquarters: Jl. P. Mangkubumi No. 40-46
- City: Yogyakarta
- Country: Indonesia
- Website: www.minggupagi.com

Minggu Pagi (Indonesian for Sunday Morning) is an Indonesian general interest weekly newspaper published by the Yogyakarta-based Kedaulatan Rakyat Group. It began in 1948 as a magazine, switching to the tabloid format in the 1980s.

== History ==
Minggu Pagi was established as a magazine in Yogyakarta on 7 December 1948 by M. Wonohito and H. Samawi; the former was the editor in chief of the newspaper Kedaulatan Rakyat. Afterwards, the magazine did not publish again until 1950. The issues published through early 1951 were listed as Volume 2. In April 1953 Minggu Pagi jumped from Volume 4 to Volume 6, thus bringing the number of volumes in-line with the years since the magazine was established.

During a period of hyperinflation in the early 1960s, Minggu Pagi ceased publication as a standalone magazine. It was reduced to eight pages and included as a supplemental with the newspaper Kedaulatan Rakyat; as a result, the magazine's subscribers were required to pay extra for the newspaper. As the economy improved in the 1970s, Minggu Pagi was again issued as a stand-alone publication. It ultimately migrated to the tabloid format in the 1980s.

In 1992 the United States Information Service described Minggu Pagi, which by then consisted of twelve pages, as one of the oldest extant press publications in Indonesia. At this time it was one of several media published by Kedaulatan Rakyat Group, together with the newspaper Kedaulatan Rakyat, the children's magazine Gatotkaca, and the Javanese-language magazine Mekar Sari.

== Contents ==
In its early years, Minggu Pagi included articles on a variety of topics, including science, film, traditional culture, tourism, and sports. It also included space for literary works, primarily short stories. Among short story writers and other authors, the magazine was seen as providing an alternative space for publication, one accessible to those who had not yet been recognized by the Jakarta-based "rulers" of the Indonesian literary canon. Given this opportunity, as well as the honorariums paid to authors, Minggu Pagi soon became a popular medium in which local writers could publish their works.

In the 1950s, the Indonesian author Nasjah Djamin described Minggu Pagi as a "cesspool", a descriptor that the academic Will Derks characterises as "embracing the low status and insignificance [the magazine] might have had in the eyes of scholars and critics". Nevertheless, by 1988 more than four hundred writers had contributed their literary works to the magazine and its successor. These included Motinggo Busye, Satyagraha Hoerip, Rendra, Bakri Siregar, and Djamin, who published his novel Hilanglah Si Anak Hilang in Minggu Pagi between 1960 and 1961 on request of the editors. (Note: The novel was published in Volume 13, issues 39–42 (Kratz 1988, p. 158).)

In the 1990s, Minggu Pagi had a column on sexuality, "Liku-Lika Seksualitas", managed by a "Dr. Rosi". It also regularly featured information on miraculous healing, sacred sites, and invulnerability practices.

== Works cited ==
- Browne, Kevin (1999). Landscapes of Desire and Violence: Storied Selves and Mental Affliction in Central Java, Indonesia (PhD. dissertation). University of Wisconsin. OCLC 42751443.
- Budiman, Kris (2000). Feminis Laki-Laki dan Wacana Gender [Male Feminists and Gender Discourse] (in Indonesian). Magelang: Indonesiatera. ISBN 978-979-9375-14-8.
- Derks, Will (2002). "Sastra Pedalaman: Local and Regional Literary Centres in Indonesia". In Foulcher, Keith; Day, Tony (eds.). Clearing a Space: Postcolonial Readings of Modern Indonesian Literature. Leiden: KITLV Press. pp. 325–348. ISBN 978-90-6718-189-1.
- Kratz, Ernst Ulrich (1988). A Bibliography of Indonesian Literature in Journals: Drama, Prose, Poetry. Yogyakarta: Gadjah Mada University Press. ISBN 978-979-420-108-4.
- "Minggu Pagi". Ensiklopedi Sastra Indonesia (in Indonesian). Ministry of Education and Culture. Archived from the original on 15 June 2017.
- Swift, Ann (1989). The Road to Madiun: The Indonesian Communist Uprising of 1948. Ithaca, NY: Cornell Modern Indonesia Project publications. ISBN 978-0-87763-035-7.
- United States Information Service (1992). A Brief guide to the Indonesian Media. Jakarta: United States Information Service. OCLC 26101027.
