= Suara Pembaruan =

Former newspaper in Indonesia

- Memihak Kebenaran (Siding with the Truth)
- Type: Daily newspaper
- Format: Broadsheet
- Owner: BeritaSatu Media Holdings
- Founded: October 4, 1987
- Ceased publication: January 31, 2021
- Language: Indonesian
- Headquarters: BeritaSatu Plaza 11th Floor; Jalan Jenderal Gatot Subroto Kav. 35-36, South Jakarta
- City: Jakarta
- Country: Indonesia
- Sister newspapers: Jakarta Globe; Investor Daily
- Website: www.beritasatu.com subscribe.investor.id (e-paper)

Suara Pembaruan (lit. 'Voice of Renewal') was an Indonesian daily newspaper. Founded in 1987, it was one of the largest newspapers in Indonesia. Suara Pembaruan brand is owned by BeritaSatu Media Holdings, a subsidiary of Lippo Group, who also owned business daily Investor Daily and television channel BeritaSatu.

== History ==
Suara Pembaruan was first published as an evening newspaper on 4 February 1987. The paper was published as a replacement for Sinar Harapan, which had been shut down on 9 October 1986 for making political commentary critical of the New Order regime. It maintained many of the same key people, although a member of the People's Representative Council was chosen as General Director.

In 1991, Suara Pembaruan reported a circulation of roughly 340,000, ranking as the fourth largest selling daily behind Kompas, Pos Kota, and Jawa Pos. The following year it ranked second in advertising revenue, trailing behind Kompas. Suara Pembaruan formerly holds shares in The Jakarta Post, which was co-founded by its progenitor Sinar Harapan.

Suara Pembaruan remains in publication, even after some staff were leaving the paper to revive Sinar Harapan in 2001. Since then, both were competing each other as the same evening newspapers until Sinar Harapan ceased publication and went online-only in late 2015.

In 2006, Mochtar Riady of Lippo Group sat as one of the stakeholders of Suara Pembaruan. This is the beginning of the group ownership of the paper in the next years to come, through its subsidiary Globe Media Group which was later transformed into BeritaSatu Media Holdings.

Starting 13 January 2020, Suara Pembaruan turned from evening into morning newspaper. As of 2020, the paper was published Monday to Saturday, with no Sunday edition.

In a release by BeritaSatu Media Holdings on January 21, 2021, Suara Pembaruan will ceased publication starting on 1 February 2021, citing "digital technology that change people's behavior in obtaining information". In addition, Beritasatu Media Holdings admits that the group has long prepared a systematic media migration from print to digital. However, Suara Pembaruan brand would be retained and "would return to the public one day in a different format in line with the information technology development".

== Style ==
David Hill describes Suara Pembaruan's management as being commercially pragmatic and politically cautious, with marketing focused on the secular middle class. Its Christian character has received much discussion in Indonesia.
