= Sahid Group =

Indonesian hospitality conglomerate

Sahid Group is an Indonesian conglomerate with the hotel industry as its core business, based in Jakarta. The group was founded in 1953 by Sukamdani Sahid Gitosardjono. Under the Sahid Hotels chain, the group operates 11 hotels across Indonesia, plus one hotel in Bukhara, Uzbekistan. It also manages three more hotels in partnership with other companies: the Ascott-branded Yello Hotel Beachwalk Bali, and the Marriott-branded Aloft Kuta Bali and Sheraton Bali Kuta.

Aside from accommodation, Sahid has delved into media (Bisnis Indonesia), healthcare, textiles, real estate, and education industry. Sahid Sudirman Center, a skyscraper in Jakarta, was funded by a joint venture of Sahid Group, Pikko Group, and Tan Kian Konsorsium which is known as KSO Sahid Megatama Karya Gemilang and was finished in 2015.
