= Marco Kartodikromo =

Indonesian journalist and writer

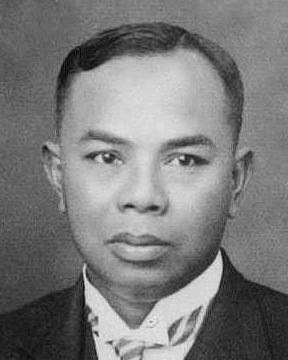
- Kartodikromo in the early 1920s
- Born: 1890; Blora, Central Java, Dutch East Indies
- Died: 18 March 1932 (aged 41–42); Boven-Digoel, Papua, Dutch East Indies
- Other names: Mas Marco (pen name)
- Occupations: Journalist, writer
- Years active: 1911–1926

Marco Kartodikromo (1890 – 18 March 1932), also known by his pen name Mas Marco, was an Indonesian journalist and writer.

Born to a low-ranking priyayi (noble) family in Blora, Dutch East Indies, Kartodikromo's first employment was with the national railway. Disgusted by the racism shown there, in 1911 he moved to Bandung and found work as a journalist for Medan Prijaji. The following year he moved to Surakarta and worked with two publications, Saro Tomo and Doenia Bergerak; he soon began to write pieces critical against the Dutch colonial government, which led to his arrest. After a period as a correspondent in the Netherlands, Kartodikromo continued his journalism and critique of the government; he also wrote several pieces of fiction. Involved with the Communist Party of Indonesia, after a 1926 communist-led revolt Kartodikromo was exiled to Boven-Digoel prison camp in Papua. He died in the camp of malaria in 1932.

Kartodikromo, who preferred writing in Malay, experimented with new phrasings at a time when the state-owned publisher Balai Pustaka was attempting to standardise the language. According to literary critic Bakri Siregar, he was the first Indonesian writer to openly criticise the Dutch colonial government and the traditional form of feudalism practised in the country. For this vocal criticism, the Dutch government decried him as a "crazy" man who could spark unrest among the native populations.

== Biography ==
=== Early life and career ===
Kartodikromo was born in Blora, Central Java, Dutch East Indies, in 1890 to a low-ranking priyayi (noble) family. At the age of fifteen, he took up a job at the Nederlandsch-Indische Spoorweg, the national railway company of the Indies, in Semarang. In 1911 he chose to leave the company as he was disgusted by its racist policies, including the use of race as a basis for the amount paid in wages.

Kartodikromo made his way to Bandung, West Java, where he found employment at Medan Prijaji, a newspaper run by Tirto Adhi Soerjo. When the paper was closed by the Dutch, in 1912 Kartodikromo went to Surakarta. There, he joined Sarekat Islam, an organisation of Muslim merchants, and found employment at the Sarekat Islam-backed weekly Saro Tomo. In 1914 he took lead of the magazine Doenia Bergerak. The paper was the mouthpiece of the Native Indonesian Journalists' Group (Inlandse Journalisten Bond), which Kartodikromo led and had helped establish with Tjipto Mangoenkoesoemo and Darnakoesoemo. That same year, he published the three-volume work Mata Gelap (Dark Eyes); this led to a long polemic between Doenia Bergerak and the Chinese-owned Tjoen Tjioe in Surabaya due to perceived racism.

While with Doenia Bergerak, Kartodikromo wrote an attack on the Dutch Advisor on Native Affairs R.A. Rinkes; in his editorial, he wrote that the Dutch loved themselves far more than the natives they were subjugating. On 26 January 1915, Kartodikromo came under investigation by the Justice Office of the Dutch East Indies for publishing several further anti-Dutch editorials. The journalist unsuccessfully attempted to raise money to protest this at the Dutch parliament in The Hague. He was convicted of revolutionary activity and sentenced to nine months at Mlaten Prison; however, due to public outcry he was released after 100 days. When Doenia Bergerak went bankrupt, Kartodipuro then headed the Saro Tomo.

=== Further career, exile, and death ===
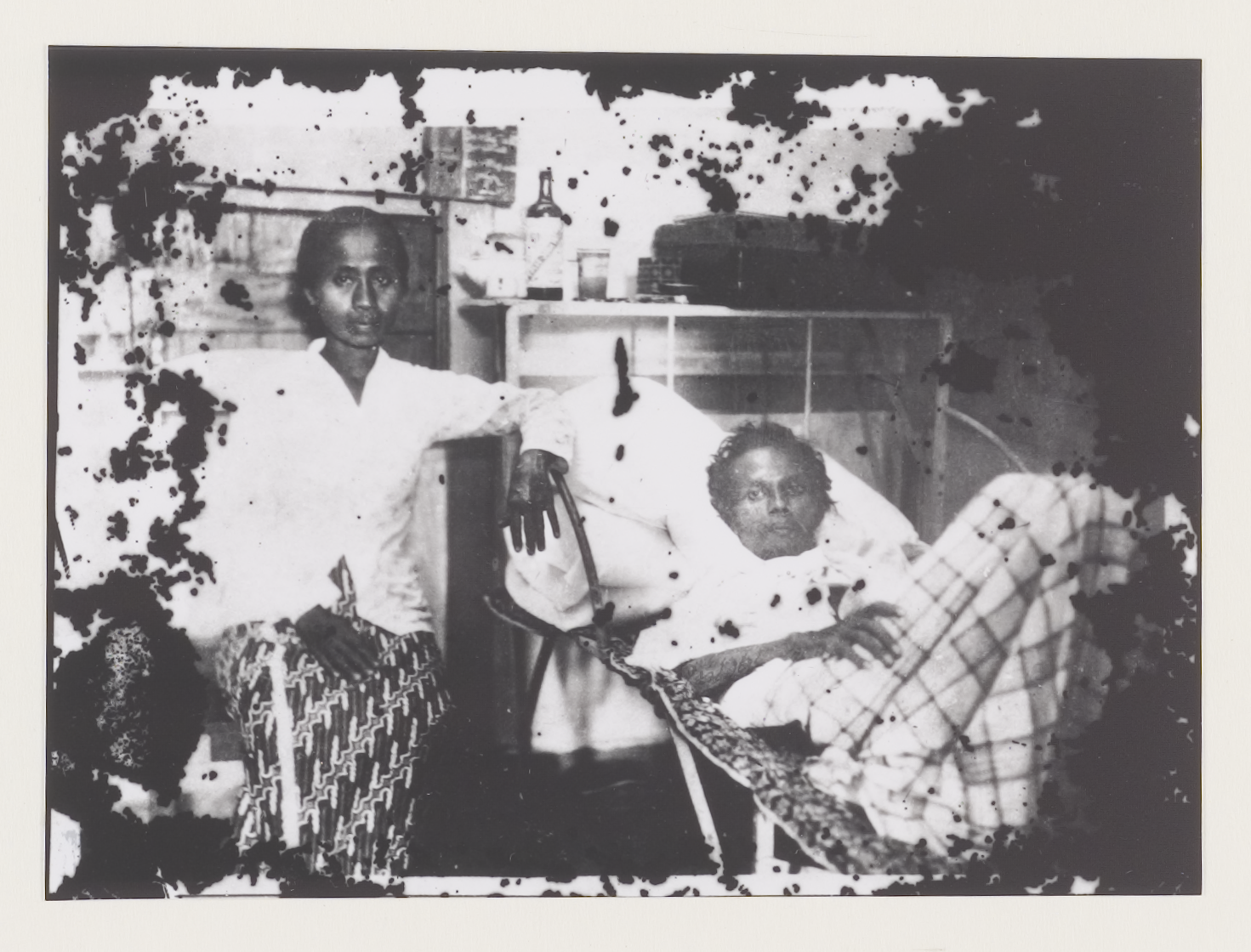
Kartodikromo with his wife in 1932, in the internment camp at Tanamerah (Boven-Digoel).

Kartodikromo was soon chosen by Goenawan, chief editor of the daily Pantjaran Warta, to go to the Netherlands as a correspondent. In his five months there at the end of 1916 and beginning of 1917, the journalist published Boekoe Sebaran Jang Pertama (The First Publication Book). After his return to Indonesia, he became an editor for Pantjaran Warta and based himself in Batavia (now Jakarta). Within a month he was imprisoned again for his writing.

On 21 February 1918 Kartodikromo was released from prison. He moved to Semarang and became a commissioner of the Sarekat Islam with Semaun; he also joined the newspaper Sinar Djawa (later Sinar Hindia). In a conference that year, Kartodikromo stated that there were two kinds of press in Indonesia: the "black press" (pers item), which struggled against the imperialistic Dutch; and the "white press" (pers putih), which worked to subjugate the Indonesian people.

In 1918 he published Student Hidjo (Student Green), which told of a young Indonesian student who falls in love while studying in the Netherlands despite already having a fiancée in Indonesia. The work, originally published as a serial, was novelised in 1919. Also in 1918 he published a collection of poems, Sair-sair Rempah (Poems on Spices).

Kartodikromo published another novel, Matahariah, in 1919. It was based on the life of the Dutch spy Mata Hari. On 15 December 1919, Kartodikromo left Sinar Hindia and took a position as head of Soero Tamtomo, published by the Forestry Union Staff Union Wono Tamtomo. He was imprisoned for six months for one of his writings, Sjairnja Sentot (Sentot's Poem), with the paper. In 1921 Kartodikromo moved to Salatiga and became involved with the press there. He was sentenced to two years in a Batavian prison for another of his writings.

In 1924, Kartodikromo published Rasa Merdika (A Sense of Independence), which dealt with a young man who goes against his priyayi father, a tool of the Dutch colonial government, and tries to find personal independence. Another novel, Cermin Buah Keroyalan (Mirror of the Fruit of Royalty), and stage play, Kromo Bergerak (Kromo is Moving), were published not long after.

Kartodikromo was exiled to Boven-Digoel, Papua, in 1926 for his writings and involvement in the 1926 revolt led by the Communist Party of Indonesia. He died there of malaria on 18 March 1932.

== Themes and styles ==
Most of Kartodikromo's fictional works took place in Bandung or Surabaya. He was an early Indonesian example of the social realist movement. Like most nationalist writers at the time, Kartodikromo preferred writing in Malay (the predecessor of modern Indonesian) rather than his native Javanese; however, he did write several pieces in Javanese. While the state-owned publisher Balai Pustaka was attempting to standardise Malay, Kartodikromo experimented with the language, using words, phrases, and scenes which had never before been used.

Socialist literary critic Bakri Siregar writes that Kartodikromo drew on his experiences while visiting the Netherlands in writing Studen Hidjo. He also writes that, unlike writers published by Balai Pustaka, Kartodikromo was heavily against the "white superiority" (Note: Original: "... superioritet kulitputih ...") which the Dutch impressed upon native Indonesians; this was achieved through showcasing the "depravity of bourgeois morals and the Dutch colonials." (Note: Original: "... kebedjatan moral bordjuasi dan Belanda kolonisator.")

== Reception ==
Due to his vocal criticism of the Dutch, the East Indies government banned Kartodikromo's books several times. In response to his critiques in Doenia Bergerak, they described him as a "crazy" man who could spark unrest among the native populations. Kartodikromo himself enjoyed baiting the colonial government, reportedly inviting his readers to work together and criticise the Dutch for their "mismanagement and caprice".

Siregar described Kartodikromo as the first Indonesian writer to openly criticise the Dutch colonial government and the traditional form of feudalism practised in the country; he also notes that the writer was the first Indonesian to consciously depict class struggles in his works. As Siregar considered Indonesian literature to have been born from a nationalist understanding, he considered Marco one of the first truly Indonesian writers.

Hendrik Maier, a lecturer at Leiden University, writes that Kartodikromo was "primarily inspired by dreams and ideals", noting that the writer intended to create a community of politically aware Indonesians to work against the colonial government in solidarity and equality. Kartodikromo described his ideal political state as having "sama rata sama rasa" ("the same standards, the same feelings").

== Works ==
- Mata Gelap (Dark Eyes; 1914; novel in three volumes)
- Sair-sair Rempah (Poems on Spices; 1918; poetry anthology)
- Student Hidjo (Student Green; 1918; novel)
- Rasa Merdika (A Sense of Independence; 1924; novel)
- Cermin Buah Keroyalan (Mirror of the Fruit of Royalty; 1924; novel)
- Kromo Bergerak (Kromo is Moving; 1924; stage play)
