= Hua Chi Pao =

Hua Chi Pao (Chinese: 火炬报, 'Flame of the Revolution') was a short-lived Chinese language daily newspaper published in Jakarta, Indonesia from 1963 to 1965. Publishing of the newspaper began on 2 December 1963. It was the third Chinese-language newspaper established in Jakarta in 1963 under the April 1963 new media law. The newspaper was tied to the Indonesian Nationalist Party (PNI). Hua Chi Pao had a circulation of around 10,000 copies. The paper was shut down in October 1965 during a wave of repression against left-wing and minority newspapers following the failed 30 September Movement.
