= Jatingaleh =

Subdistrict in Semarang City, Central Java, Indonesia

Coordinates: 7°01′35″S 110°25′25″E

Jatingaleh (Indonesian pronunciation: [d͡ʒat̪iˈŋalɛh]; Javanese: Jatingalèh) is a village in Candisari district, Semarang city, Central Java, Indonesia. Its population is estimated at around 12,500 residents. Although it was historically a distinct village, due to urbanization it is now surrounded by the greater city of Semarang.
