= Selompret Melajoe =

Newspaper

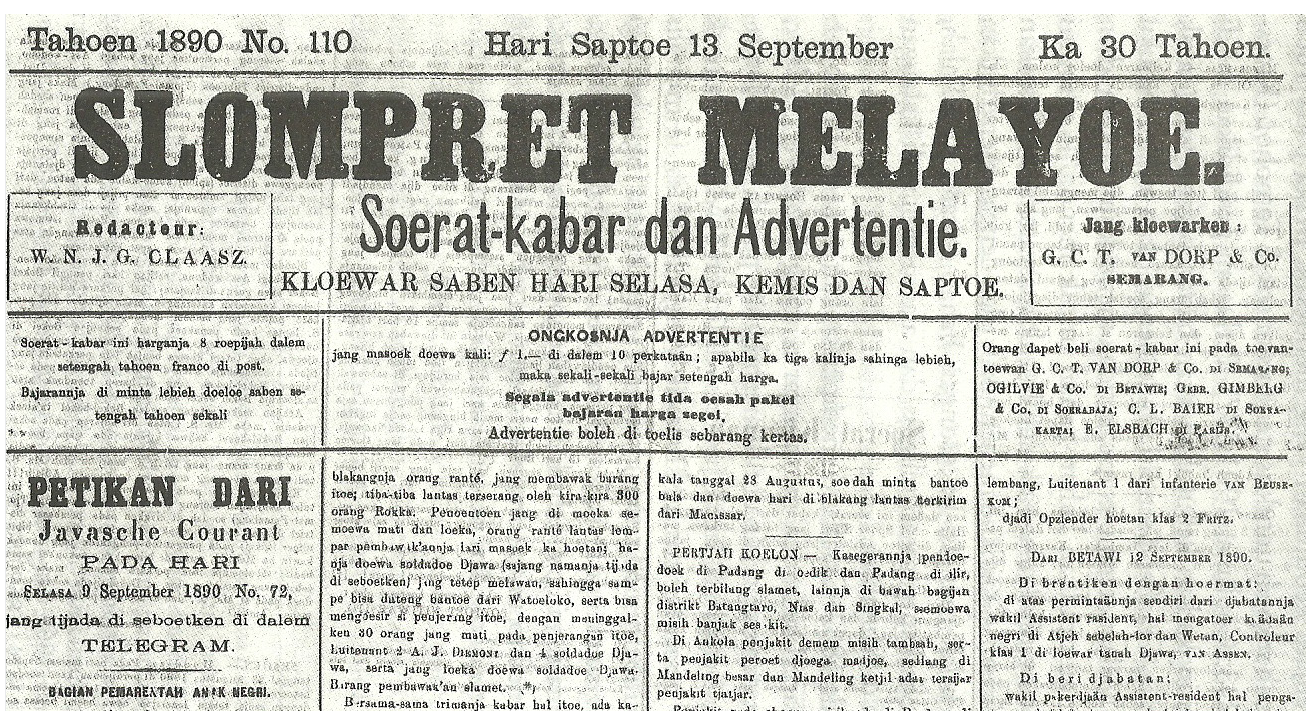
Front page of Slompret Melayoe, September 13 1890

Selompret Melajoe (Malay for 'Malay trumpet') was one of the first Malay language newspapers to publish in the Dutch East Indies. It was printed in Semarang, Central Java from 1860 to 1920.

Due to the lack of a standard spelling for the Malay language in the Latin alphabet prior to the introduction of the Van Ophuijsen Spelling System, the name of the newspaper was variously spelled Slompret Melajoe, Selompret Melajoe, Selompret Melaijoe, or Slompret Melayoe during its history. The spelling in modern Indonesian orthography would be Selompret Melayu.

== History ==
Selompret Melajoe was one of the first Malay-language newspapers published in the Dutch East Indies. The very first is thought to be Kabar Bahasa Melaijoe ('Malay language news'), launched in Surabaya, East Java in January 1856, followed by Soerat Chabar Betawi (Batavia newspaper) in Batavia in April 1858. Selompret Melajoe was launched in Semarang, Central Java on February 3, 1860 by G.C.T. van Dorp & Co, a bookshop owner. The company also printed a Dutch-language paper called Semarangsch Courant ('Semarang news'). Many of its readers in the early years were Peranakan Chinese and Priyayi, although its editors were Europeans and Indos. In its early years it was quite careful to focus mainly on business and civil service topics, since coverage of politics could cause the Dutch to close down the paper. Due to those strict laws, the owners kept the identity of the editors secret, and the publisher took legal responsibility for any infractions. It was only from 1866 onwards that the name of the editor appeared on the paper itself; the first named editor was D. Appel. In those years a newspaper in Low Malay was still considered to be something of a curiosity, especially as it came to comment more and more on social topics, since Dutch and Javanese were generally considered the languages of sophisticated discussion.

Along with its rival Malay-language paper Bientang Timoor, the paper prospered greatly during its first twenty years, until other Malay papers began to appear in Java and Sumatra. In the 1870s it was estimated to have a circulation of 4–600. In 1871 the paper's editor, along with that of the Samarangsche Courant and a writer at De Locomotief, were charged with press offenses in district court for slandering the name of the village head (Lurah) of Jatingaleh, a village not far from Semarang. Their crime was that they described him as an arsonist despite his having been acquitted.

In April 1882 a retired assistant resident of Kendal Regency named G.R. Lucardie took over as the new editor of the paper. His independent nature and high-profile among the Priyayi were said to be assets at the time of the announcement. He was also fluent in not only Malay but also Javanese, and worked as a translator for local officials. In 1883 Lucardie was charged under the strict press regulations by the Raad van Justitie for his coverage of a court case involving the District Chief (Wedana) of Ambarawa and some village heads (Lurah). Lucardie was sentenced to two months in prison.

In January 1887 a retired colonial controlleur named G.L. Hilling took over as editor of the paper from Lucardie, who was quite ill and who would die only two months later. However, by August he had already announced his resignation. In the 1890s the editor was W.N.J.G. Claasz.

In August 1901 then-editor J.J.P. Halkema brought his son J. Halkema on board as a co-editor. As his health failed, the elder Halkema stepped down from his editorial position in late 1903 and was temporarily replaced by his son until D. Appel, an employee of the Van Dorp Co. who had edited the paper decades earlier, was appointed. Halkema died in 1904.

In the 1910s the paper struggled to compete with the dozens of new, politically charged Malay language papers which arose in response to Tirto Adhi Soerjo's groundbreaking Medan Prijaji. The paper apparently employed its first Javanese editor during this time, Mas Soekardjo, who also edited the Poro Tjitno and was involved in the Sarekat Islam movement in the mid-1910s. Selompret Melajoe printed its final issue in 1920.
