= Koran Manado =

Newspaper

- Type: Daily Newspaper
- Format: Print
- Owner: Lintas Manado Group
- Publisher: Lintas Manado Group
- Political alignment: Secular
- Language: Indonesian
- City: Manado
- Country: Indonesia

Koran Manado is an Indonesian-language daily newspaper based in Manado, Indonesia, published by Lintas Manado Group.

== People ==
The editor-in-chief as well as managing director is Adry Mamangkey. Regularly contributing are senior editor Hermanto Maindoka, and Ram Makagiansar.

== Issues and style ==
The Koran Manado has a big section for Politics and Law. Economics are under-represented. Opinions and commentaries are also a major part of the paper. There are some authors who contribute regular columns. Every day the paper has an interview with some prominent politician, author, scientist or artist. Koran Manado has a circulation of around 17,000 copies.
