= Han Po =

Defunct Dutch East Indies newspaper

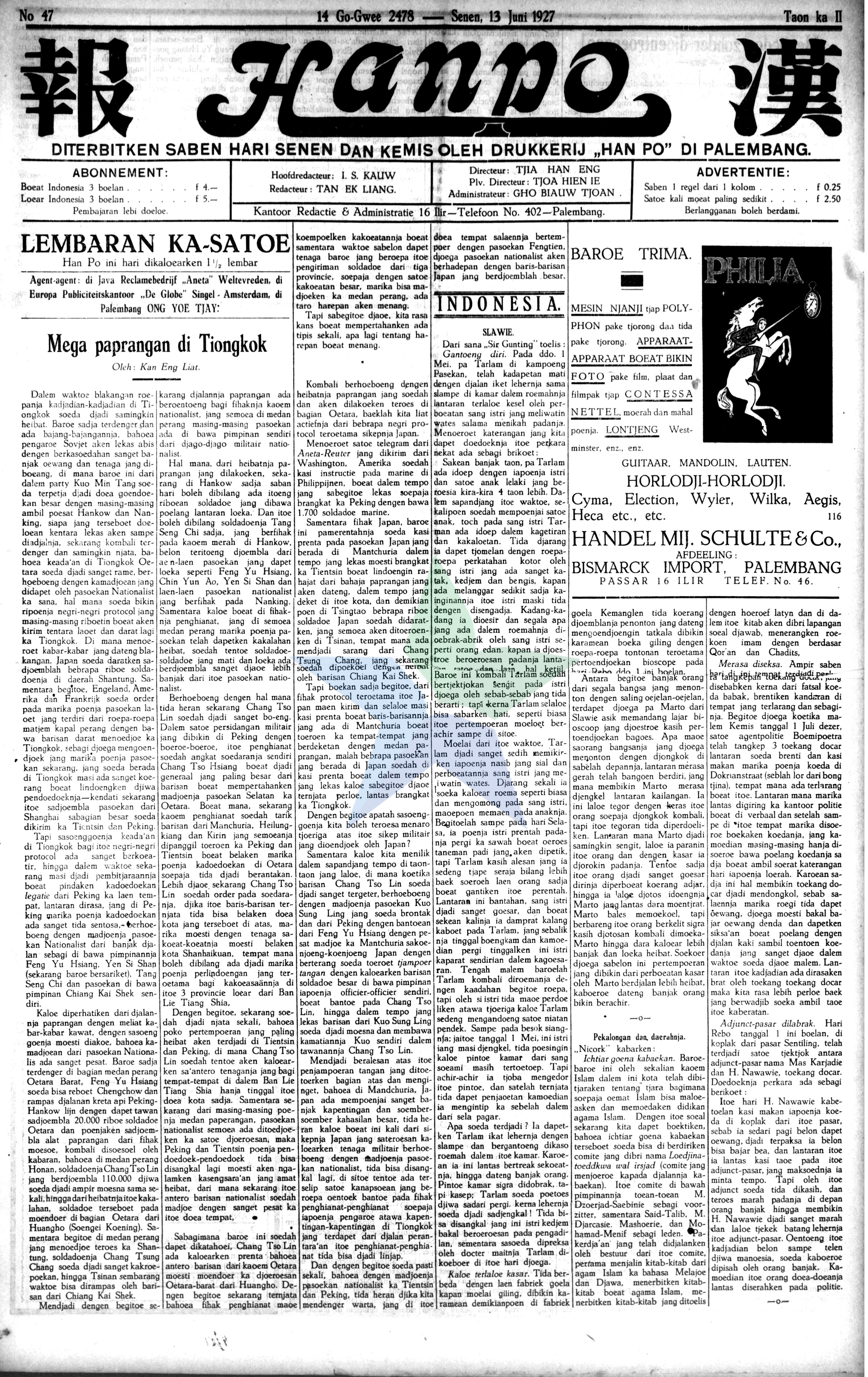
- Front page of Han Po, 13 June 1927
- Type: Twice weekly newspaper
- Format: Broadsheet
- Founded: 8 November 1926
- Ceased publication: 18 January 1934
- Language: Indonesian
- Headquarters: Palembang
- Country: Dutch East Indies

Han Po was a twice-weekly Chinese Indonesian newspaper based in Palembang which was published between 1926 and 1934. The newspaper began publication on 8 November 1926 after initially publishing several sample editions. It was a primarily commercial newspaper and focused on commercial news, charging f 4 per three months for subscribers within the Indies. It published on Mondays and Thursdays.

Early in its publication, along with other Chinese Indonesian newspapers such as Sin Po, Han Po opted to reject the use of the Van Ophuijsen Spelling System in its orthography in favor of older, nonstandardized spelling systems. The paper was a vocal critic of the colonial government's policy to deny Chinese Indonesians citizenship, even if they had been born within the colony. It also adopted a pro-assimilation editorial stance in contrast to Sin Po. Following the Great Depression, reduced revenues forced the newspaper to cease publication, its final edition being on 18 January 1934.
