= Sinar Hindia =

Newspaper in Dutch East Indies 1900 to 1924

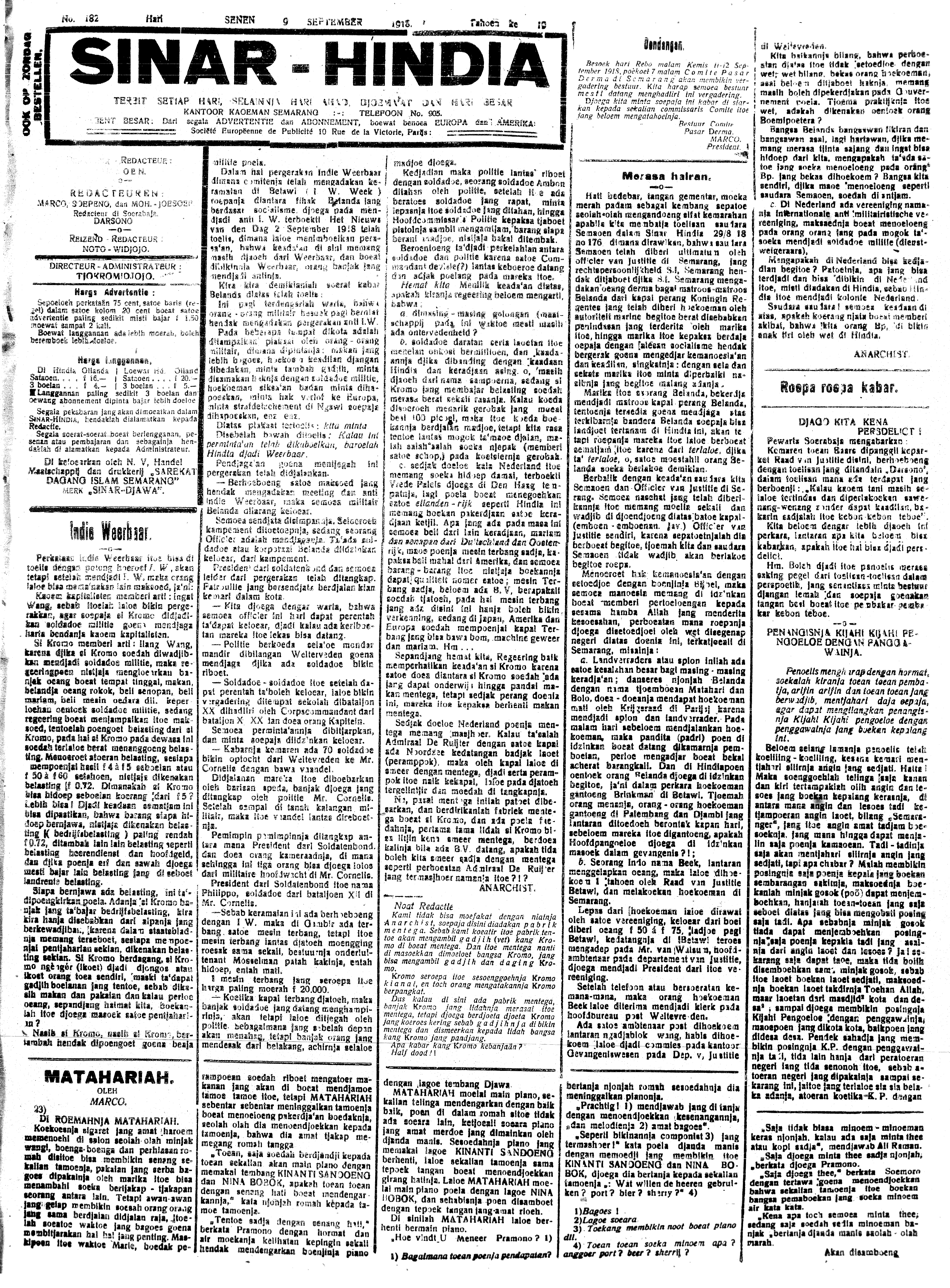
The front page of Sinar Hindia, September 9, 1918

Sinar Hindia (known as Sinar Djawa until 1917) was a left-wing Malay language newspaper from Semarang, Dutch East Indies, which published from 1900 to 1924. In its later years it was the mouthpiece of the left wing of the Sarekat Islam and its editors Mas Marco Kartodikromo and Semaun were instrumental in the rise of the Communist Party of Indonesia.

The paper, then known as Sinar Djawa, was founded in 1899 or 1900 by Sie Hian Ling, a Peranakan Chinese businessman who had been editor of various other local papers in Semarang over the previous decade. He, and the owners Hoang Thaif & Co. agreed to sell it to the early Indonesian nationalist organization Sarekat Islam in 1913 or 1914. It had a more moderate political line until 1917 when the owners gave editorial control from Mohammad Joesoef to Semaun, the radical protégé of Sarekat Islam leader Tjokroaminoto. The name was changed to Sinar Hindia (light of the Indies). Although the paper was still tied to the Muslim identity based Sarekat Islam, it took an explicitly Marxist turn. It saw society as a struggle between the kaoem boeroeh (Malay: working class) or rajat (Malay: populace) and the capitalist class.

Some of Mas Marco's novels were originally serialized in the pages of Sinar Hindia such as Semarang Hitam and Student Hidjo.

In 1924 the paper was relaunched as Api (Malay: fire) and more explicitly tied to the Communist Party of Indonesia.
