= Sinar Indonesia Baru =

Indonesian daily newspaper

- Untuk Demokrasi, Persatuan, dan Pembangunan (For Democracy, Unity and Development)
- Type: Daily newspaper
- Format: Broadsheet
- Owner: PT Sinar Indonesia Baru
- Founder: GM Panggabean
- Founded: May 9, 1970; 55 years ago
- Language: Indonesian
- Headquarters: Jl. Brigjen Katamso No 66 AB Medan, North Sumatra 20151
- City: Medan
- Country: Indonesia
- ISSN: 0215-3157
- Website: hariansib.com

Sinar Indonesia Baru (New Rays of Indonesia, also known by its abbreviation SIB) is an Indonesian daily newspaper published in Medan, North Sumatra. The newspaper was founded on 9 May 1970 by GM Panggabean, a former contributor at Waspada; it claims itself as the only newspaper founded by a Bataknese. Besides printed edition, Sinar Indonesia Baru also maintain its online presence.

In a 2011 writing, Sinar Indonesia Baru was among the largest circulated daily newspaper in Indonesia, with the circulation of about 150,000.
