= The Bali Times =

Newspaper in Bali, Indonesia

- Type: Daily newspaper
- Format: Broadsheet
- Owner: PT. Lestari Kala Media
- Founded: March 18, 2005
- Language: English
- Headquarters: Seminyak, Bali
- City: Badung
- Country: Indonesia
- Website: www.thebalitimes.com

The Bali Times was the first English-language newspaper published in Bali in broadsheet format. It was founded by journalist William J. Furney, a former international newswire correspondent based in Jakarta, and launched its first edition on March 18, 2005.

After about a decade in print, the newspaper transitioned to an online-only publication. Its coverage includes local, national and international news; commentary; features; business; health; the arts; and sport.

The newspaper is published by PT Lestari Kala Media in Seminyak, Bali.
