= Bakri Siregar =

Indonesian literary critic

- Siregar in 1980
- Born: 14 December 1922; Langsa, Atjeh, Dutch East Indies
- Died: 19 June 1994 (aged 71); Jakarta, Indonesia
- Known for: criticism of Indonesian literature, short story and playwright
- Scientific career
- Fields: literary criticism
- Institutions: University of Warsaw, University of North Sumatra, Peking University

Bakri Siregar (14 December 1922 – 19 June 1994) was an Indonesian socialist literary critic and writer.

== Biography ==
Siregar was born in Langsa, Aceh, Dutch East Indies, on 14 December 1922. He was active writing by the Japanese occupation in the early 1940s, as evidenced by one of his short stories, "Tanda Bahagia" ("Sign of Happiness"), being published in Asia Raja on 1 September 1944.

After Indonesia's independence, Siregar went to the Soviet Union to further study socialism. He considered their system efficient and beneficial to the populace, which reaffirmed his ideology. He also praised Soviet writers who rejected cosmopolitanism and abstractionism. He published several dramas after returning to Indonesia, including the original Tugu Putih (White Monument; 1950), Dosa dan Hukuman (Sin and Punishment, based on Crime and Punishment by Fyodor Dostoyevsky), and Gadis Teratai (Lotus Blossom Maiden, based on a Korean folktale).

By 1951 Siregar had reached Medan, the capital of North Sumatra. While there, he took up a position as a high school teacher and, in 1952, joined the leftist oriented Institute of People's Culture (Lembaga Kebudajaan Rakjat, or Lekra). Siregar published his first analysis of Indonesian literature, Ceramah Sastra (Lectures on Literature), in 1952. In 1953 he published a collection of short stories, entitled Jejak Langkah (Footsteps); that same year, he became the head of the North Sumatran branch of Lekra. The following year he released the stageplay Saijah dan Adinda, based on a story in Dutch author Multatuli's novel Max Havelaar. While a high school teacher, Siregar used his position to spot upcoming actors and direct them to Lekra's stage production company Dinamo.

From 1956 until 1957, Siregar taught Indonesian language at the University of Warsaw in Poland. Afterwards, he returned to Indonesia and taught Indonesian at the University of North Sumatra in Medan until 1959. His final teaching position was as a lecturer on the history of Indonesian literature at Peking University in China, a position which he held until 1962. While he was in Peking, he also sat on Lekra's board of directors; after returning to Indonesia in 1962, he continued in this capacity and in 1965 became the institute's director. In 1964 he published Sedjarah Sastera Indonesia Modern I (History of Modern Indonesian Literature I). Sedjarah focused on the Balai Pustaka and Poedjangga Baroe eras and applied a strong Marxist view. The work was the first history of Indonesian literature, as well as the last published work to apply Marxist theory to Indonesian literature up until 2000.

After the failed coup d'état – described by the government as having been led by the Indonesian Communist Party – on 30 September 1965, leftists were hunted by the military and the general public, while such institutions were closed. Siregar himself was arrested and spent twelve years in prison. His manuscript from the period, Angkatan-Angkatan dalam Sastra Indonesia (Periods in Indonesian Literature), remains unpublished.

Siregar died in Jakarta on 19 June 1994.

== Views ==
Siregar defined Indonesian literature as works written in Indonesian which reflected the nation's struggle for continued independence. Although he recognised earlier literary works in local languages and Malay, he believed that modern Indonesian literature began with the Indonesian National Awakening in the 1920s. He viewed the early institutions of Indonesian literature poorly, describing Balai Pustaka as using "language politics, ... used to divide the Indonesian people on ethnic lines" (Note: Original: "... Politik bahasa ... dititikberatkan pada usaha mengobar-obarkan perasaan kesukuan.") while Poedjangga Baroe was described as a bourgeois work which was unable to objectively understand the needs of the people and therefore unfit to truly reflect the struggle for independence.

Siregar divided Indonesian literature into four periods, as follows:

1. Early 20th century until 1942, beginning with the works of Marco Kartodikromo and continuing through the founding of Balai Pustaka and publication of Poedjangga Baroe
2. 1942 until 1945, during the Japanese occupation of the Dutch East Indies; literature was published by the Cultural Centre (Keiman Bunka Sidosho)
3. 1943 until 1949, during the Indonesian National Revolution; represented by Chairil Anwar's Gelanggang group
4. After 1950, a period which he describes as "half colonial and half feudalist"; (Note: Original: "... setengah djadjahan dan setengah feodal ...") he describes the period as being full of conflict between socialists and nationalists

== Legacy ==
After the 30 September Movement failed, the Indonesian Communist Party, its followers, and other leftists were written out of history Soeharto's New Order government. Siregar's writings, although influential in their time, were also buried. His Sedjarah was banned, and as of 2010 was still difficult to obtain.
