= Waspada =

Indonesian daily newspaper published in Medan

- Demi Kebenaran dan Keadilan (For the Sake of Truth and Justice)
- Type: Daily newspaper
- Format: Broadsheet
- Owner: PT Penerbitan Harian Waspada
- Founder(s): Mohammad Said & Ani Idrus
- Founded: January 11, 1947; 79 years ago
- Language: Indonesian
- Headquarters: Jalan Letjen Suprapto/Brigjen Katamso No. 1 Medan, North Sumatra 20151
- City: Medan
- Country: Indonesia
- ISSN: 0215-3017
- Website: www.waspada.co.id

Waspada (Aware) is an Indonesian daily newspaper published in Medan, North Sumatra by PT Penerbitan Harian Waspada. Having first published on 11 January 1947, it is the third oldest continuously published newspaper in Indonesia, only behind Kedaulatan Rakyat of Yogyakarta and Mimbar Umum of Medan. It is one of the largest newspapers in the city.

== History ==
Waspada was first published by Mohammad Said and his wife Ani Idrus on 11 January 1947, in the midst of Indonesian National Revolution. The name Waspada comes from Mohammad Said advice to the public to be "aware" in facing various possibilities in the nation's struggle against the Dutch, especially the Dutch strategy which resulted in huge losses for the Republic of Indonesia sovereignty and its fighters. Its first numbers only consisted of two pages. Issuance of the second number on Monday (because the paper was not published on Sunday) had to be compacted, on the opposite page only a notice was displayed.

The newspaper was firmly declared itself to be the supporters of Indonesian independence. This stance was shown through firm and sharp news and articles against the Dutch who continued to try to exert their influence and grip on occupying Medan and its surroundings in order to control plantation lands, such as the tobacco area or spice commodities.

In September 1964, the leadership of Waspada were passed to Tribuana Said, the eldest son of Mohammad Said and Ani Idrus. Tribuana Said's sympathetic appearance led many publishers of Medan-based newspapers to appoint him as chairman of the Medan branch of Association for Promoting Sukarnoism (BPS). However, on 17 December 1964 President Sukarno issued a decree to disband the BPS; followed later by the Decree of Minister of Information on 23 February 1965 concerning the ban of 21 newspapers who participated in the BPS, including Waspada. On 17 August 1967 Waspada, led again by Mohammad Said, began publishing again.

Waspada has repeatedly changed its motto. The current motto Demi Kebenaran dan Keadilan (For the Sake of Truth and Justice) has appeared since 1 February 1969. This motto was chosen because it is in accordance with the paper's mission, such as exercising control, criticism and constructive correction in accordance with the law.

The online portal Waspada Online was officially established on 11 January 1997 to coincide with the 50th anniversary of the paper. On 24 June 2009 Waspada Online was re-launched and inaugurated by Vice President Jusuf Kalla.
