= Indopos =

Indonesian daily newspaper

- Type: Online newspaper
- Owner: PT Indonesia Digital Pos
- Founded: February 25, 2003
- Ceased publication: December 30, 2020 (print)
- Language: Indonesian
- Headquarters: Komplek Puri Pakkita, Kavling 18 No. A.4; Jalan AMD-X, Kreo, Larangan, Tangerang, Banten
- City: Tangerang
- Country: Indonesia
- Circulation: 103,720 (2019)
- OCLC number: 73638807
- Website: www.indopos.co.id www.indoposco.id

Indopos is an Indonesian online newspaper based in Tangerang, Banten, and formerly a local daily newspaper in Jakarta. It is currently owned by PT Indonesia Digital Pos, headquartered in Puri Pakkita complex in Tangerang.

== History ==
Indopos newspaper was first published 25 February 2003. It was published by PT Indopos Intermedia Press, a subsidiary of Jawa Pos Group. Indopos at the time was considered as "the Jakarta version of Jawa Pos", as Jawa Pos is also owned a number of local newspapers across the country. At the time, Indopos was headquartered in Graha Pena Jawa Pos Jakarta building in West Jakarta.

Indopos was circulating mainly within Special Capital Region of Jakarta as well as Banten and West Java province, with total circulation of 103,720 as of 2019. The paper was not published on Sunday. Besides newspaper, it was published a tri-monthly lifestyle magazine iFACE.

Indopos ceased publication on 30 December 2020. Its online portal was managed by PT Tunas Intermedia Globe, before it was managed by PT Indonesia Digital Pos.
