= SWA (magazine) =

- Editor: Kemal E. Gani
- Categories: Business
- Frequency: Biweekly
- Circulation: 39,172 (2022)
- Publisher: PT Grafiti Pers
- Founded: 1985; 41 years ago
- First issue: 1 February 1985
- Company: Sembada Swakarya Foundation
- Country: Indonesia
- Based in: Jakarta
- Language: Indonesian
- Website: SWA Online
- ISSN: 2339-1855

SWA is a biweekly business magazine based in Jakarta, Indonesia. Established in 1985, the magazine was first named as SWA Sembada. It has attracted thousands of readers across the archipelago. The magazine is part of Sembada Swakarya foundation and is published by PT Grafiti Pers, a subsidiary of the foundation.

== Logos ==
From 1985, there are three different logos for this magazine. The first logo was in use from 1985 to 2003, the second logo was in use from 2003 to 2011, and the third and current logo was in use from 2011.
