= Sinar Harapan =

- Memperjuangkan Kemerdekaan dan Keadilan, Kebenaran dan Perdamaian Berdasarkan Kasih (Struggling for Freedom and Justice, Truth and Peace based on Love)
- Type: Online newspaper
- Owner: PT Sinar Harapan Persada
- Founded: 27 April 1961 (21,703 issues)
- Ceased publication: 2 October 1965 (first); 2 January 1972 (second); 20 January 1978 (third); September 1986 (fourth); 31 December 2015 (final, in print)
- Relaunched: 8 October 1965 (first); 12 January 1972 (second); 4 February 1978 (third); 2 July 2001 (fourth and final)
- Language: Indonesian
- City: Jakarta
- Country: Indonesia
- Website: www.sinarharapan.co

Sinar Harapan (Rays of Hope) was an Indonesian evening daily newspaper published by PT Sinar Harapan Persada and is currently an online-only portal. First published on 27 April 1961, Sinar Harapan underwent several bans during both Old Order and New Order before the last ban in 1986 left the paper in vacuum for more than 10 years. The paper reappeared in 2001 after the Reform era, and published its last print issue on 31 December 2015.

== History ==
=== Initial ===
Sinar Harapan was first published on 27 April 1961. The figures involved in the establishment of Sinar Harapan were Dr. Komang Makes, Lengkong, Ds. Roesman Moeljodwiatmoko, Simon Toreh, Prof. Dr. Soedarmo, J.B. Andries, Dr. J. Leimena, Supardi, Ds. Soesilo, Ds. Saroempaet, Soehardhi, Ds.S. Marantika, Darius Marpaung, Prof. Ds. J.L.Ch. Abineno, J.C.T. Simorangkir SH, Ds. W.J. Rumambi, H.G. Rorimpandey, Sahelangi, A.R.S.D. Ratulangi and Dra. Mrs. B. Simorangkir. H.G. Rorimpandey was appointed as the paper's first general manager.

Sinar Harapan underwent several bans from the government and military during its lifetime. On 2 October 1965 Sinar Harapan was banned so that the September 30 Movement was not freely exposed by the media, only certain media can be published. The ban was lifted and published again on 8 October 1965.

=== New Order and closure ===
In July 1970 the New Order government highlighted Sinar Harapan report that exposed Commission IV of the DPR report on corruption. The government considers that Sinar Harapan has violated the press code of ethics because it preceded the President, because the President's report was only to be read out by the President Suharto on his state speech on 16 August 1970. However, several parties praised Sinar Harapan for being superior in news getting. In this case, the Honorary Council of PWI concluded that they did not have sufficient reason to say that there was a violation of the press code of ethics by Sinar Harapan.

In January 1972, Sinar Harapan again dealt with the Honorary Council of the Press because of its 31 December 1971 news. On 2 January 1973 the chief of Kopkamtib temporarily revoked the Sinar Harapan permit relating to the state annual budget plan reporting, the paper was allowed to publish again on 12 January 1973. In connection with the 1974 Malari incident, several media outlets were again banned, including Sinar Harapan. On 20 January 1978 Sinar Harapan was ordered via telephone by Kodam Jaya Public Affairs Office (Pendam V Jaya) to not published for the next day, probably because its reporting on student activities which were deemed to heat up the political situation. On 4 February 1978, Sinar Harapan was allowed to publish again.

What hit the hardest was the ban and, subsequently, cancellation of the press permit by the government on 9 October 1986 as a result of the headline "Government to Revoke 44 Trade Decree on Import Sector" published by Sinar Harapan a day before. After the ban, H.G. Rorimpandey continues to look for ways to be able to re-publish the paper. On 4 February 1987, after going through long negotiations with the government he was allowed to re-publish a newspaper, albeit with much difference from the former paper. Suara Pembaruan, the name of the new paper, was published with the new publisher PT Media Interaksi Utama and the new editors. The new paper has a quite similar concept from the previous paper, including its logo and section. The ban was forced Sinar Harapan, as well as its publisher PT Sinar Kasih, to not publish it again, at least until the fall of New Order.

Initially Sinar Harapan circulation was only about 7,500 copies, but jumped to 25,000 copies at the end of 1961. Over time Sinar Harapan continued to develop into a leading national newspaper and is known as "the king of evening newspaper". As an illustration, in 1985 Sinar Harapan had published around 250,000 copies per day. The original number of employees in 1961 was around 28, in 1986 the number increased to around 451.

=== Revival ===
Sinar Harapan was published again on 2 July 2001 by H.G. Rorimpandey and Aristides Katoppo under the auspices of PT Sinar Harapan Persada. Even though it was "buried" for about 14 years, the revival of Sinar Harapan has received a positive response from various parties, including government elites, political elites, business people, professionals, advertising agencies to newspaper agents. Several journalistic awards have also been received by several Sinar Harapan journalists.

While Sinar Harapan was revived, Suara Pembaruan remains in publication; since then both were competing each other as the evening newspaper.

Sinar Harapan officially stopped print publication starting in 2016 due to problems with leaving investors in the paper. In the final edition on 31 December 2015, Daud Sinjal as the general manager says his farewell, gratitude and apologize to its loyal readers. Though the statement also announced the discontinuation of its online presence, in fact Sinar Harapan still retains its online portal until the present day.

== See also ==
- Manila Chronicle - A newspaper in the Philippines that was also forcefully closed down by the government.
