= Kedaulatan Rakyat =

Indonesian daily newspaper published in Yogyakarta

- Suara Hati Nurani Rakyat (Voice of the People's Conscience)
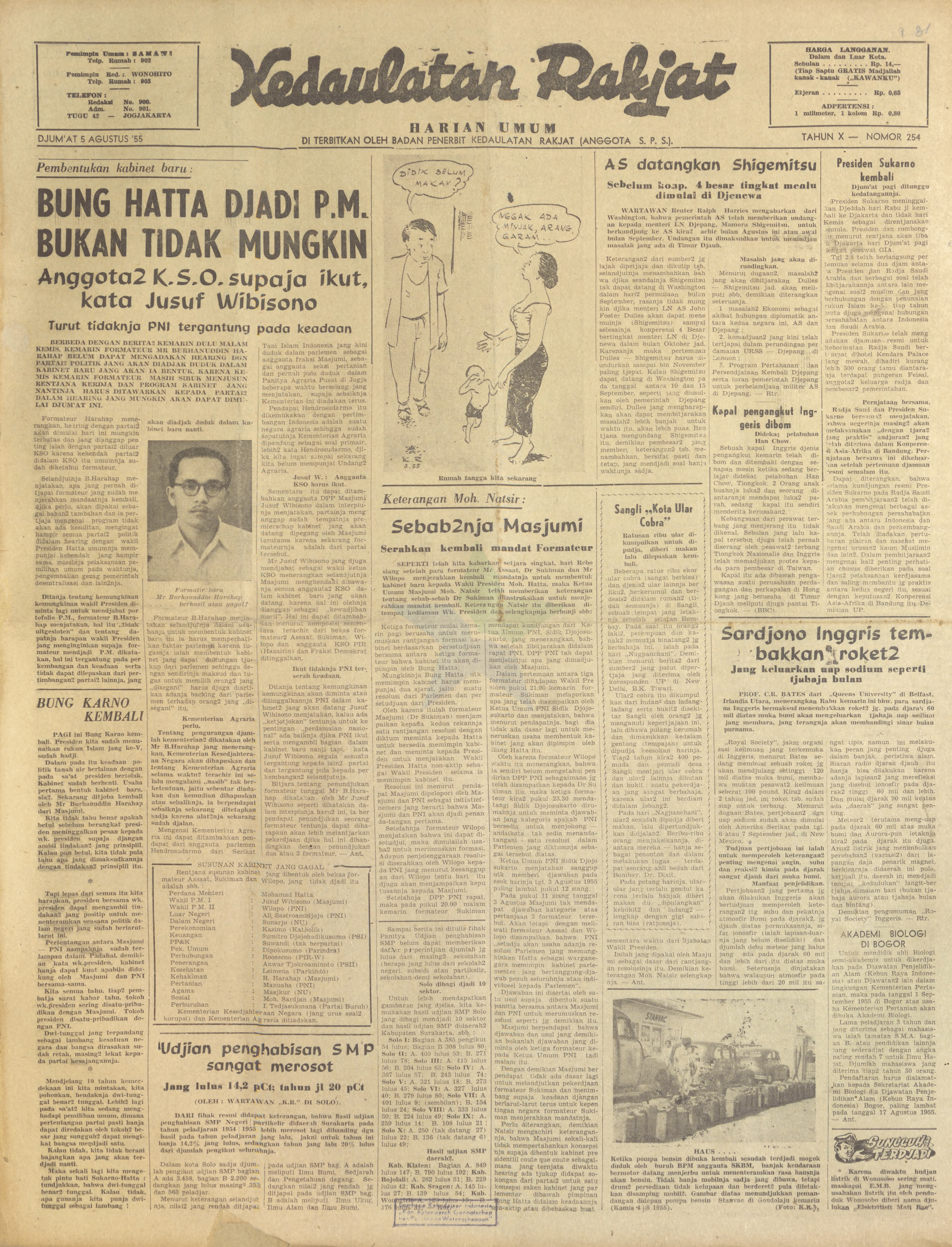
- Front page, 5 August 1955
- Type: Daily newspaper
- Format: Broadsheet
- Owner: PT. BP Kedaulatan Rakyat
- Founder(s): H. Samawi and M. Wonohito
- Editor-in-chief: Dr. Gun Nugroho Samawi
- Managing editor: Mussahada, Drs Hudono SH, Joko Budhiarto
- Founded: September 27, 1945; 80 years ago
- Headquarters: Jl. P. Mangkubumi 40-42, Jetis, Yogyakarta
- City: Yogyakarta
- Country: Indonesia
- Sister newspapers: Koran Merapi, Minggu Pagi
- ISSN: 0852-6486
- Website: www.krjogja.com

Kedaulatan Rakyat (lit. 'People's Sovereignty', abbreviated as KR) is a daily newspaper in Yogyakarta, Indonesia. The paper was founded by H. Soemadi and M. Wonohito. The newspaper was first published on September 27, 1945 and is still in print, making it the first newspaper published after Indonesian independence, as well as the oldest continuously published newspaper in Indonesia.

Initially, Kedaulatan Rakyat consisted of 16 pages. Recently, it has become the largest newspaper in Yogyakarta and southern Central Java, and at one time circulates 125,000 copies.

Its motto is Suara Hati Nurani Rakyat (Voice of the People's Conscience).

== History ==
A November 1945 "quick publication" of Kedaulatan Rakyat concerning the early days of national revolution

KR is the second newspaper to be published in Yogyakarta after the Javanese-language newspaper Sedya Tama, was published biweekly. When Sedya Tama was banned by the Japanese, the Japanese army established a new newspaper called Sinar Matahari (Sunlight).

Driven by the desire to publish an Indonesian-owned newspaper by the Indonesian government, after its independence H. Soemadi, M. Wonohito and Sinar Matahari staff members - who were mostly Indonesian - took over the paper and established a new daily called Kedaulatan Rakyat. The phrase Kedaulatan Rakyat is taken from the Preamble to the 1945 Constitution.
