= Pikiran Rakyat =

Indonesian daily newspaper published in Bandung

- Dari Rakyat - Oleh Rakyat - Untuk Rakyat (From the People - By the People - For the People)
- Type: Daily newspaper
- Format: Broadsheet
- Owner: Grup Pikiran Rakyat
- Founded: 24 March 1966; 59 years ago
- Language: Indonesian
- Headquarters: Bandung, West Java
- City: Bandung
- Country: Indonesia
- Sister newspapers: Galamedia
- Website: www.pikiran-rakyat.com

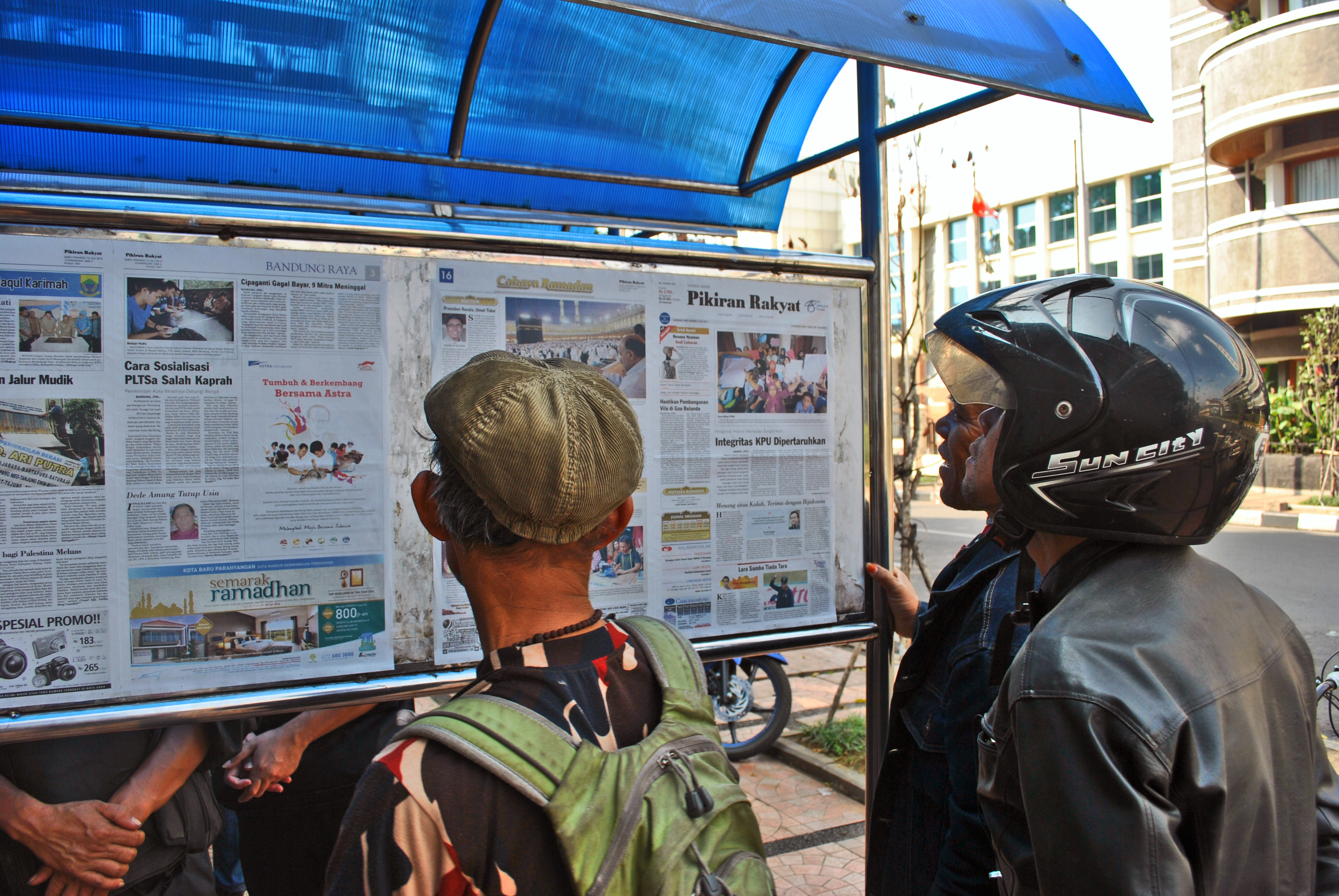
People in Bandung reading Pikiran Rakyat

Pikiran Rakyat (Indonesian: People's Thought) is a daily newspaper published in Bandung, West Java, Indonesia. Its circulation covers West Java and Banten Province.

== History ==
Pikiran Rakyat was first published on 30 May 1950 by director and editor-in-chief Djamal Ali and A.Z. Palindih and an editor named Indra Soemarsono joined the newspaper in the early 1950s. It was published by Bandung N.V., located on what is now called Jalan Asia Afrika in Bandung. Its motto was Mengadjak Pembatja Berpikir Kritis (Indonesian: "Invites Readers to Think Critically").

Politically speaking, the newspaper had a left nationalist stance, but it wasn't affiliated with any political party.

There were various other newspapers published under this name in Indonesia. There was a short-lived political magazine by Sukarno in 1932 called Fikiran Ra'jat in which he promoted his ideology of Marhaenism. The magazine ended its run in under a year when Sukarno was exiled from Java. In the 1950s, there were multiple newspapers publishing at the same time under this name including one in Padang called Fikiran Rakjat, Pikiran Rakjat published in Makassar, and Fikiran Rakjat published in Palembang.

=== Liberal Democracy Period ===
Pikiran Rakyat was founded shortly after the end of the Indonesian war of independence against the Netherlands, and it quickly rose to prominence during the Liberal democracy period in Indonesia. During its early years the paper expressed the notion that the government should be a third force in society to balance the political forces of the left and the right in order to obtain an even evolution of both ideology, the newspaper also noted that the army should be a non-political force. The director of the newspaper, Djamal Ali, was a high-profile journalist in Indonesia, he was chairman of the Newspaper Companies Union (Indonesian: Serikat Perusahaan Surat Kabar), and by 1955 was a council member of the Indonesian Journalists Association (Indonesian: Persatuan Wartawan Indonesia).

In September 1954, the paper expressed support for Sutan Sjahrir, leader of the Indonesian Socialist Party, stating that he should lead the opposition to the government which had few worthy figures in it. They published an editorial soon after calling on president Sukarno to resign due to his marriages to multiple women in quick succession which they believed to be unlawful. They continued to attack him editorially, saying the radical Sukarno of the past was long gone, and that he was too mired in compromises and complacency.

=== Guided Democracy Era ===
The paper continued to have conflicts with Sukarno during the Guided Democracy era. During his visit to the United Nations in September 1960 he preemptively seized the printing presses of Pikiran Rakyat as well as Abadi, Suara Rakjat, and other papers. The papers were permitted to resume publication after his return.

=== New Order Era ===
In January 1966, Pikiran Rakyat had to stop printing because they are unable to meet the requirement that dictates every newspaper had to have an affiliation with a certain "political power" or choose to join with another newspaper assigned by then Ministry of Enlightenment (now Ministry of Communication and Informatics). With the help of Panglima Kodam Siliwangi, Ibrahim Adjie at the time, the journalists that were out of work, guided by Sakti Alamsyah and Atang Ruswita, published a new newspaper called Angkatan Bersenjata West Java Edition with affiliation to the daily Angkatan Bersenjata that published in Jakarta with a publishing rights (Indonesian: Surat Izin Terbit (SIT)) No. 021/SK/DPHM/SIT/1966. The first edition of the newspaper published on 24 March 1966, this coincides with the 20th anniversary of the Bandung Sea of Fire event.

Not one year after the dissolution of the original newspaper, the Ministry of Enlightenment revoked the requirement that a newspaper entity had to be affiliated. Panglima Kodam Siliwangi therefore release the newspaper dependency with Kodam. With this development, as of March 24, 1967, the newspaper changed their name to Pikiran Rakyat, shortened to PR which is the newspaper known-as until today with then daily circulation of 20.000 newspapers although it does not have its own independent printing press. In April 1973 the paper was restructured into an independent company once again under the name PT Pikiran Rakyat Bandung, acquired its own printing press and was able to greatly increase circulation with Press Publishing Business License (Indonesian: Surat Izin Usaha Penerbitan Pers) for PT. Pikiran Rakyat Bandung No. 035/SK. MENPEN/SIUPP/A.7/1986.

== Award ==
In December 2011, Pikiran Rakyat has got award of "The Most Responsible Media Group".
