= Jakarta Globe =

Indonesian English-language newspaper

- Type: Online newspaper
- Owner(s): B Universe (Enggartiasto Lukita)
- Founded: November 2008; 17 years ago
- Language: English
- Headquarters: Tokyo HUB PIK 2, Jl. Otista, Pantai Indah Kapuk 2, Tangerang, Banten, Indonesia
- City: Jakarta
- Country: Indonesia
- Sister newspapers: Suara Pembaruan; Investor Daily
- ISSN: 2087-9431
- OCLC number: 272545308
- Website: jakartaglobe.id

The Jakarta Globe is a daily online English-language newspaper in Indonesia, launched in November 2008.

The paper initially came out as a print newspaper with an average of 48 pages a day, and was published Monday through Saturday. It had three sections. Section A contained a range of general news, including metropolitan, national and international coverage, as well as commentaries. Section B featured Indonesian and world business, news, sports and a classified advertising section. Section C offered extensive features and lifestyle content, as well as entertainment, listings, reader service and puzzle/cartoon pages. The newspaper later added a Sunday edition of the Jakarta Globe. It converted from broadsheet to tabloid format in May 2012, and then transitioned to an online-only publication from 15 December 2015.

The newspaper's owner, PT Jakarta Globe Media, is part of Enggartiasto Lukita's B Universe (formerly Globe Media Group and BeritaSatu Media Holdings, both of which are associated companies of Lippo Group).

== See also ==
- List of newspapers in Indonesia
- Media of Indonesia
