= The Jakarta Post =

Indonesian daily English language newspaper

- The front page of The Jakarta Post on 30 August 2025, with the headline about the August 2025 Indonesian protests
- Type: Daily newspaper
- Format: Broadsheet
- Owner: PT Bina Media Tenggara (Kompas Gramedia Group)
- Founded: 25 April 1983; 43 years ago
- Language: English
- Headquarters: Jl. Palmerah Barat 142–143; Jakarta, Indonesia
- Country: Indonesia
- ISSN: 0215-3432
- Website: www.thejakartapost.com

The Jakarta Post is a daily English-language newspaper in Indonesia. The paper is owned by PT Bina Media Tenggara and based in the nation's capital, Jakarta.

The Jakarta Post started as a collaboration between four Indonesian media groups at the urging of Information Minister Ali Murtopo and politician Jusuf Wanandi. After the first issue was printed on 25 April 1983, it spent several years with minimal advertisements and increasing circulation. After a change in chief editors in 1991, it began to take a more vocal pro-democracy point of view. The paper was one of the few Indonesian English-language dailies to survive the 1997 Asian financial crisis and currently has a circulation of about 40,000.

The Jakarta Post also features an online edition and a weekend magazine supplement called J+. The newspaper is targeted at foreigners and educated Indonesians, although the middle-class Indonesian readership has increased. Noted for being a training ground for local and international reporters, The Jakarta Post has won several awards and has been described as being "Indonesia's leading English-language daily". The Jakarta Post is a member of the Asia News Network.

== History ==
=== Founding and development ===
The former logo of The Jakarta Post. Used until 31 March 2016.

The Jakarta Post was the brainchild of Information Minister Ali Murtopo and politician Jusuf Wanandi, who were disappointed at the perceived bias against Indonesia in foreign news sources. At the time, there were two English-language dailies in the country, The Indonesia Times and The Indonesian Observer. However, as these existing papers were poorly perceived by the public, they decided to create a new one. To ensure credibility, the two convinced a group of competing newspapers (the Golkar-backed Suara Karya, the Catholic-owned Kompas, the Protestant-owned Sinar Harapan, and the weekly Tempo) to back the nascent paper. They hoped it would become a quality English-language paper in Southeast Asia, similar to The Straits Times in Singapore, the Bangkok Post as well as the now-defunct The Nation in Thailand as well as The Star, the now-defunct The Malay Mail, and New Straits Times in Malaysia.

After PT Bina Media Tenggara decided to back the paper, Wanandi spent several months contacting influential figures at the competing newspapers. In exchange for their cooperation, Kompas requested a 25 percent share in the new newspaper, for which it would handle the daily business operations, such as printing, circulation, and advertising. Tempo offered to assist with management in return for a 15 percent share, while Sabam Siagian of Sinar Harapan was hired as the first chief editor, for which Sinar Harapan received stock. The establishment of the paper was further aided by incoming Information Minister Harmoko, who received five percent interest for his role in acquiring a license. In total, the start-up cost Rp 500 million (US$700,000 at the time). Muhammad Chudori, a co-founder of The Jakarta Post who formerly reported for Antara, became the newspaper's first general manager.

Further details, including Sinar Harapan's share of stock and the paper's publisher, were decided at a meeting at Wanandi's office in March 1983. The next month, on 25 April, the first edition—totalling eight pages—was published. The first newsroom of the new paper was located in Kompas's former laundry room, a one-story warehouse; the first employees had to do the layout by hand, using pica poles as straight edges. During the first few months, the writers translated and recycled previously published stories from Indonesian media, which were later picked up by foreign wire services. Original reporting was rare at first as the editors did not want to deal with the censorship of Suharto's New Order government.

In the early years of its publication, The Jakarta Post had difficulty attracting advertisers, to the point that some editions ran without ads. However, circulation increased dramatically, from 8,657 in 1983 to 17,480 in 1988. Although it was originally hoped that the paper would begin to turn a profit within the first three years, the recession in the early 1980s led to the start-up funds being depleted. Eventually, in 1985 the paper took out an interest-free loan and received Rp. 700 million from its owners. After advertising increased, The Jakarta Post was able to turn a profit by 1988, and was considered "one of the most credible newspapers" in Indonesia.

=== Activism ===
Susanto Pudjomartono, the former chief editor of Tempo, became The Jakarta Post's second chief editor on 1 August 1991, after Siagian was chosen to be Indonesia's ambassador to Australia. Under Pudjomartono's leadership, the paper began publishing more original work and doing less translation; reporters were also asked to take a more active role in the day-to-day operations of the paper. The paper also became more vocal regarding politics, taking a pro-democracy stance like Tempo. It soon converted its offices into a new, two-story building built using the Kompas pension fund and expanded to 12 pages.

In 1994, The Jakarta Post signed a distribution agreement with the British news service Reuters and the American Dialog Information Services, allowing its stories to be more easily promoted overseas. By the mid-1990s, it had established a workshop to assist its new, foreign-born staff in learning the local culture. By December 1998, The Jakarta Post had a circulation of 41,049, and was one of the few English-language dailies in Indonesia after the 1997 Asian financial crisis; six other English-language dailies had failed. That year it also became a founding member of the Asia News Network.

== Political stance and editorial opinion ==
The Jakarta Post officially endorsed the Joko Widodo-Jusuf Kalla ticket in the 2014 Indonesian presidential election, their first time doing so in its 31-year history. Kompas noted that it was the first time official support for a presidential candidate by a media outlet in Indonesia. The Press Council considered The Post endorsement as "normal and valid".

The newspaper earned a reputation for testing the limits of censorship. In July 2014, The Jakarta Post published a cartoon showing the ISIL flag with its oval shape replaced by a skull and crossbones, with the words Allah and Muhammad (which are sacred to Muslims and found on IS flags) displayed inside the skull shape. The paper apologised and retracted the cartoon following accusations by police and some Muslim groups that the cartoon insulted Islam. Editor-in-chief Meidyatama Suryodiningrat defended its publication as a "journalistic piece" criticising ISIL.

== Partnerships ==
The newspaper has a partnership agreement in place with state media outlet China Daily to repost its content. The Jakarta Post in 2020 was one of eight news publishers selected by the US-based Google News Initiative and FTI Consulting for a four-month programme to grow its reader revenue and strengthen digital subscription capabilities.

== Editors-in-chief ==
Till today, The Jakarta Post has had seven editors-in-chief: Sabam Pandapotan Siagian (1983–1991), Susanto Pudjomartono (1991–2002), Raymond Toruan (2002–2004), Endy Bayuni (2004–2010), Meidyatama Suryodiningrat (2010–2016), Endy Bayuni (2016–2018), Nezar Patria (2018–2020) and M. Taufiqurrahman (October 2020 – present).

== Editions and other publications ==
=== Sunday edition and J+ ===
The Jakarta Post's Sunday edition was launched on 18 September 1994. The Sunday edition included more in-depth stories, as well as entertainment and fiction that would not be published in the weekday editions. As part of cost-cutting measures amid declining print advertising revenue, the Sunday edition ceased publication in April 2016. It was replaced by a lifestyle and culture magazine called J+, which is included with the newspaper's Saturday edition.

=== Online edition ===
The Jakarta Post features an online edition, which includes both print and internet exclusive stories that are free to access. There are also news flashes that are developed as they happen. The paper hopes to digitise the entirety of its printed stories, with at least 50,000 articles dating to June 1994 already digitised. In 2017, The Jakarta Post began charging subscriptions in order to access "premium" online content.

=== Bali Daily ===
On 9 April 2012 The Jakarta Post launched Bali Daily, a four-page daily newspaper produced in Bali, after noting that 4,900 of the flagship paper's subscribers lived on the resort island. Bali Daily ceased printing in 2014.

== Market ==
The Jakarta Post is targeted at Indonesian businesspeople, well-educated Indonesians, and foreigners. In 1991, 62 per cent of the paper's readers were expatriates. Under Pudjomartono's leadership, it began targeting more Indonesian readers. As of 2009, approximately half of its 40,000 readers were middle class Indonesians.

In 1996, The Jakarta Post faced invigorated competition when media tycoon Peter Gontha bought a controlling stake in rival paper The Indonesian Observer and revamped the publication. However, The Indonesian Observer was unable to match The Jakarta Post's quality of independent reporting because of Gontha's business connections to the Suharto family. He stopped printing The Indonesian Observer in June 2001.

In 2008, The Jakarta Post faced new competition, dubbed "a wake up call", when BeritaSatu Media Holdings, an associated company of billionaire James Riady, began publishing a rival English-language daily newspaper, the Jakarta Globe. The Jakarta Globe even hired several defectors from The Jakarta Post, paying them higher salaries, and the Globe's print run was 40,000. However, by May 2012, The Jakarta Globe converted from broadsheet to tabloid size, and in December 2015 it became an online only publication.

When launched in 1983, a single edition of The Jakarta Post cost Rp175. By 2018, the newspaper cost Rp7,500 in Jakarta and Rp9,500 in Bali and Nusa Tenggara. As of 2018, subscriptions cost US$11/month for the online version and US$12/month for the printed version.

== Layout and style ==
The Jakarta Post follows a broadsheet format. In the beginning, it featured an index on the front page, as well as short offbeat stories under the title "This Odd World". The lifestyle section had eight comic strips, and it used more photographs and graphics than was normal for Indonesian publications at that time. The editorials tended to be shorter than their Indonesian counterparts.

The Jakarta Post uses the inverted pyramid style of reporting, with the most important information at the beginning of the article; during the 1980s, many Indonesian papers put the lead further down. Bill Tarrant attributes this to the different writing styles in English and Indonesian, with English favouring the active voice and direct statements, while respectful Indonesian favours the passive voice and a circuitous approach. Regarding this topic, Wanandi has said that "You cannot bullshit in English, like the Javanese way."

== Public opinion ==
Peter Gelling, of The New York Times, notes that The Jakarta Post has been considered a "training ground" for local reporters, and offers apprenticeship programs. In 2009, six former The Jakarta Post reporters worked for Bloomberg. In 2014 The Jakarta Post was behind Kompas in terms of online visits.

== Awards and recognition ==
In 2006, the Reporters Union of Indonesia recognised The Jakarta Post as being one of the Indonesian newspapers that best followed journalism ethics and standards; other papers recognised were Kompas and Indo Pos. The paper received the Adam Malik Award in January 2009 for their reporting on foreign politics; the coverage was considered accurate and educated, with good analysis. The following year three reporters received the Adiwarta Award from Sampoerna for excellent photography in the fields of culture, law, and politics. Another journalist received the Adam Malik Award in 2014 for his writings which assisted the ministry to distribute information regarding foreign policy implementation.

The Union of Print Media Companies (SPS) conferred on The Jakarta Post two awards of the 2020 Indonesian Print Media Awards (IPMA) in a National Press Day event in Banjarmasin, South Kalimantan, on 7 February 2020. The Post brought home the gold award for the Best of Investigation Reporting for its 29 October 2019 edition. The publication featured a special report written by reporters Victor Mambor and Syofiardi Bachyul titled "Wamena investigation: What the government is not telling us". The report was a collaboration among journalists of the Post, Jakarta-based Tirto.id and Jayapura-based Jubi. They conducted an investigation in the field in Wamena, Jayawijaya regency, from 3 to 10 October and discovered what the government had failed to reveal.
