= Nine Dragons (Indonesia) =

Group of businessmen in the 1960s to 1990s

Nine Dragons (Indonesian: Sembilan Naga Chinese: 九龙 ) is a term referring to a group of influential businessmen of Chinese descent in Indonesia, especially those who had close ties with the New Order government. This term is often associated with significant economic and political power, although there is no consensus as to which specific businessmen constitute the "Nine Dragons".

== History ==
The term "Nine Dragons" emerged during the New Order era, which was characterized by mutually beneficial relationships between businessmen and the government. Initially, this term, also known as the 'Gang of Nine', had negative and mysterious connotations. The group was associated with illicit businesses such as gambling, drugs, and smuggling, and was considered above the law due to strong backing from authorities. After the New Order ended, the connotation of "Nine Dragons" shifted to become more neutral, referring to businessmen who dominated the Indonesian economy, considered as a result of mutualistic symbiosis with the New Order government.

=== New Order era ===
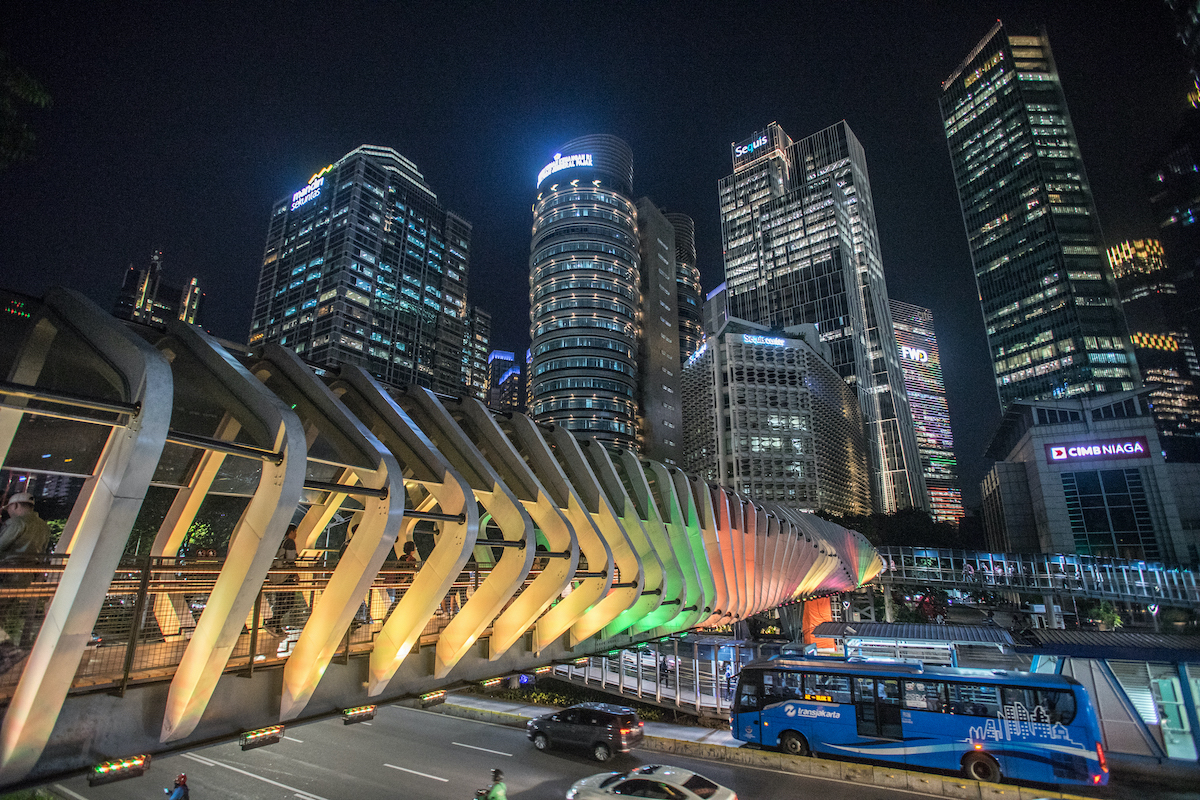
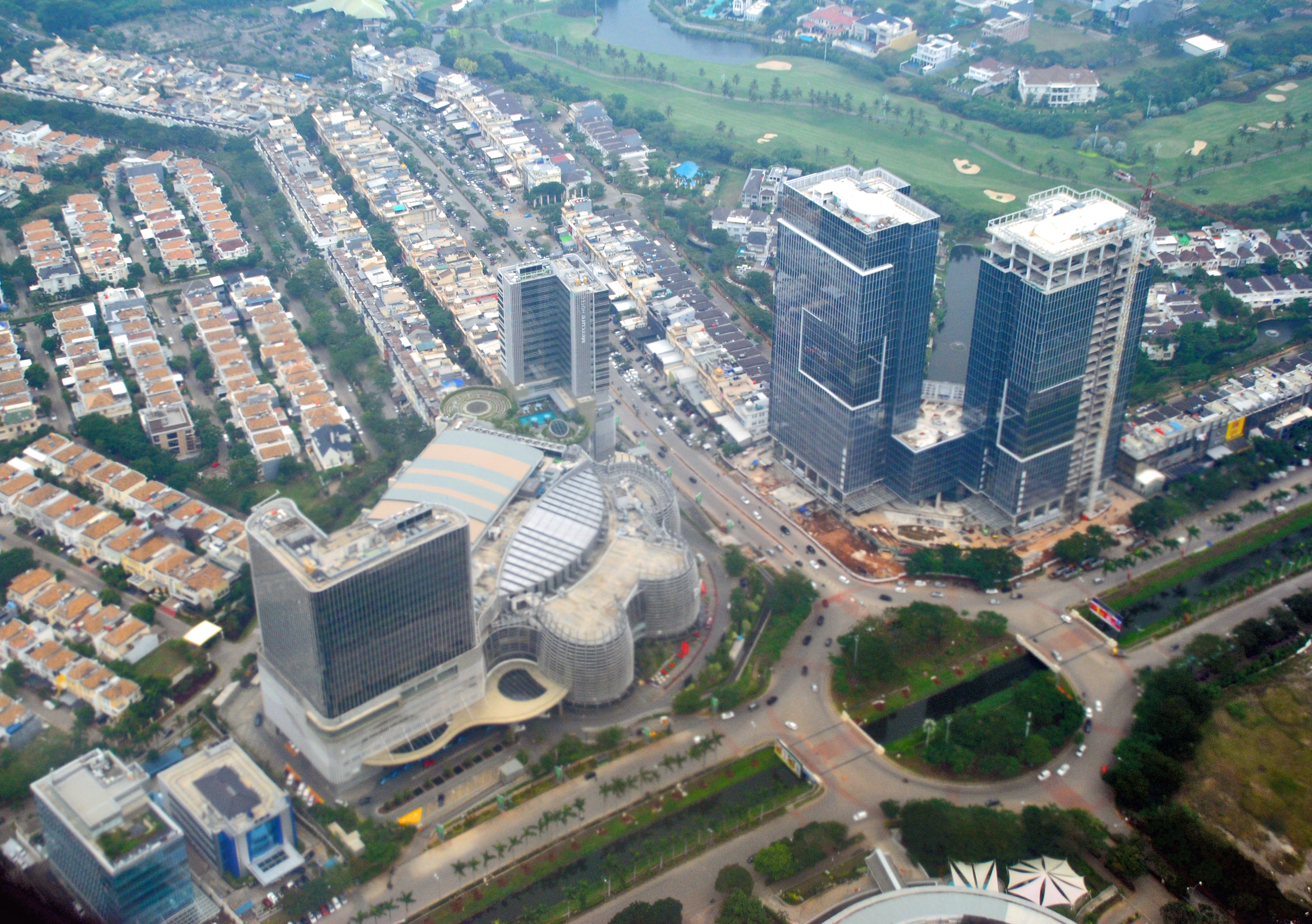
Sudirman Central Business District (left) and Pantai Indah Kapuk (right) owned by Tomy Winata and Sugianto Kusuma respectively

According to Tempo, the term "Nine Dragons" was first to be coined by former criminal turned Islamic preacher Anton Medan. The article published in 1999 was also mentioned Tomy Winata and Sugianto Kusuma to be the godfather of "Nine Dragons" due to their activities since 1970s. Their names came into spotlight after the news about both together taking over financially strapped Bank Propelat that was once owned by the armed forces.

In the New Order Era, Tomy Winata is very well known with his connection with armed forces high rankings including General Gatot Nurmantyo, who back then was the adjudant to Major General Edi Sudradjat. Tomy first contact with the military started when he was tasked to build a military barrack in Singkawang. Tomy also being trusted to supply military logistics in some region. Tomy would later cause national shockwave after the attorney general are investigating his collusion with Bank Indonesia officials for the takeover of Bank Arta Prima.

Sugianto Kusuma at the beginning started an import business. While his name was not really common in media during 1990s until 1998 when Salim Group who developed a land in Pantai Indah Kapuk are struggling financially in aftermath of 1997 Asian financial crisis. Kusuma agreed to offer help to Anthoni Salim who was recently appointed to lead Salim Group after his father, Sudono Salim fled the country for Singapore and Los Angeles due to the riot of 1998, taking over majority stake of Salim Group property business.

Aside from those two names, there are several names that are tied to the original Nine Dragons mentioned in Tempo invesitigative article such as Kwee Haryadi Kumala, Iwan Cahyadi, Yorrys, Arief Cocong, Edi Porkas, Arie Sigit, Jony Kusuma. Those names were said to be running the nightlife businesses in Jakarta ranging from nightclub and gambling as well as smuggling. Kwee Haryadi Kumala, along with his brother Kwee Cahyadi Kumala would later enter real estate business by establishing Sentul City, a planned town within the foot of Mount Salak in 1994, some speculates that the Kwee Brothers went into real estate business to launder its reputation away from illegal businesses.

=== Post-Suharto era political influence ===
After the fall of Suharto in 1998, the "Nine Dragons" still retain political influences within the government circle and the term has evolved into a group of prominent wealthy Chinese Indonesian businessmen in the country. In 2011, WikiLeaks published a leak of United States diplomatic cable exposing the corruption within the government of President Susilo Bambang Yudhoyono. The leak also highlighted the close relations between Yudhoyono and businessman and chairman of Artha Graha Group Tomy Winata. According to then Coordinating Ministry for Human Development and Cultural Affairs Agung Laksono, Yudhoyono used T. B. Silalahi to be the middleman between himself and Winata. Winata would later deny every accusation made by WikiLeaks and The Age against him.

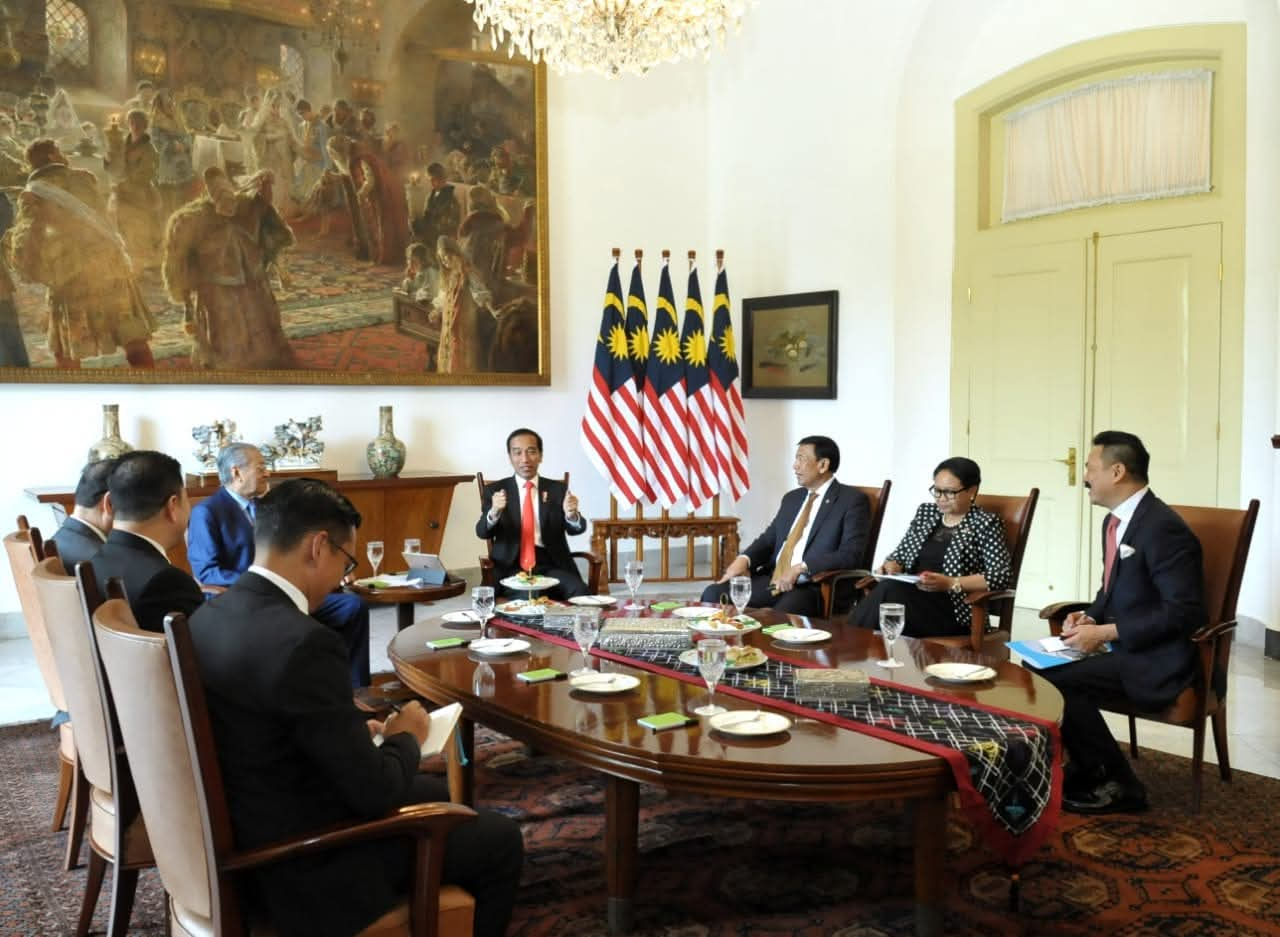
Rusdi Kirana of Lion Air Group who was an Indonesian ambassador to Malaysia at the time accompanying President Joko Widodo during Malaysian Prime Minister Mahathir Mohamad visit to Indonesia

The influence of "Nine Dragons" would continue under Joko Widodo and Prabowo Subianto presidency. During the 79th Indonesian Independence Day ceremony held in Nusantara Capital City, Chairman of Agung Sedayu Group, Sugianto Kusuma; Chairman of Sinar Mas, Franky Oesman Widjaja; and Chairman of Barito Pacific, Prajogo Pangestu was seen attending the ceremony with. Kusuma attendance was seen as a sign of his consolidation of investment in the newly built capital as he and other businessmen in attendance announced an investment consortium called "Konsorsium Nusantara". In 2024, Lippo Group chairman James Riady along with his father Mochtar Riady and his other family made a visit to Widodo private residence in Surakarta months after the end of his presidency, many speculates that Riady visit was to secure his business interest and bridging relationship between Lippo Group and the newly inaugurated President Prabowo Subianto.

Recently, Minister of Housing and Residential Area Maruarar Sirait joined forces with 4 of alleged group members such as Sugianto Kusuma, Prajogo Pangestu, Franky Oesman Widjaja and Garibaldi Thohir to build 3 million subsidized housings. During the interview, Maruarar stated that he is not giving the project tender to businessmen entirely but only contact them to partially help the government's program. Due to Maruarar closeness to the alleged members of "Nine Dragons", many people are worried about his connection could cause friction between government and people due to potential conflict of interest.

Several alleged members of "Nine Dragons" were also held political positions within the government since Widodo presidency. Lion Air Group founder Rusdi Kirana who is a member of National Awakening Party that are in coalition with Widodo government was appointed by Widodo to serve as Indonesian Ambassador to Malaysia from 2017 until 2020. Kirana also was elected as member of House of Representatives since 2024 and currently serve as Deputy Speaker of the People's Consultative Assembly. Mayapada Group founder Tahir was given a position as member of Presidential Advisory Council for Widodo government since 2019.

== Members ==
There are no conclusive sources or evidence that precisely identify the members of the Nine Dragons. Nevertheless, several names are often mentioned as potential members, including:

- Robert Budi Hartono (Djarum Group)
- Anthoni Salim (Salim Group)
- Tahir (Mayapada Group)
- Sugianto Kusuma (Agung Sedayu Group)
- Tomy Winata (Artha Graha Group)
- James Riady (Lippo Group)
- Rusdi Kirana (Lion Air Group)
- Edwin Soeryadjaya (Saratoga Investama Sedaya)
- Jogi Hendra Atmadja (Mayora)
- Peter Sondakh (Rajawali Corpora)
- Kiki Barki (Harum Energy)
- Bachtiar Karim (Musim Mas Group)
- Alexander Tedja (Pakuwon Group)
- Franky Widjaja (Sinar Mas Group)
- Prajogo Pangestu (Barito Pacific)
- Hilmi Panigoro (MedcoEnergi)
- Harun Hajadi (Ciputra Group)
- Prijono Sugiarto (Astra International)
- Arif Rachmat (Triputra Group)
- Eddy Kusnadi Sariaatmadja (Emtek Group)
- Low Tuck Kwong (Bayan Resources)
- Hermanto Tanoko (Tancorp)
- Hary Tanoesoedibjo (MNC Group)
- Martua Sitorus (Wilmar International)
- Susilo Wonowidjojo (Gudang Garam)
- Putera Sampoerna (HM Sampoerna)
- Husain Djojonegoro (ABC Holding)
- Bambang Sutantio (Cimory Group)
- Eddy William Katuari (Wings Group)
- Kuncoro Wibowo (Kawan Lama Group)
- Djoko Susanto (AlfaCorp)
- Peter Soekianto Sosrodjojo (Rekso Group)
- Soedomo Mergonoto (Kapal Api Group)
- Alim Markus (Maspion Group)
- Sudhamek (Garudafood)
- Mucki Tan (Rodamas Group)
- Otto Toto Sugiri (DCI Indonesia)
- Agoes Projosasmito (Amman Mineral Internasional)
- Arsjad Rasjid (Indika Group)
- Garibaldi Thohir (Alamtri Resources Indonesia)
- Anindya Bakrie (Bakrie Group)
- Hashim Djojohadikusumo (Arsari Group)
- Chairul Tanjung (CT Corp)
- Haryanto Adikoesoemo (AKR Corporindo)
- Muki Hamami (Trakindo Group)
- Sjamsul Nursalim (MAP)
- Jusuf Hamka (Citra Marga Nusaphala Persada)
- Irwan Hidayat (Sido Muncul)
- Siti Hartati Murdaya (Central Cipta Murdaya)
- Handojo Selamet Muljadi (Tempo Scan)
- Martias Fangiono (First Resources)
- Hapsoro Sukmonohadi (Rukun Raharja)
- Hariyadi Sukamdani (Sahid Group)
- Vidjongtius (Kalbe Farma)
- Soetjipto Nagaria (Summarecon)
- Widarto Oey (Sungai Budi Group)
- Renaldo Santosa (Japfa)
- Lim Gunawan Hariyanto (Harita Group)
- Chandy Kusuma (FKS Group)
- Sukanto Tanoto (RGE Group)
- Marcel Menaro (Meratus Line)
- Bayu Priawan Djokosoetono (Bluebird Group)
- Sri Prakash Lohia (Indorama Corporation)
- Manoj Punjabi (MD Entertainment)
- Surya Paloh (Media Group)
- Nurhayati Subakat (ParagonCorp)

Some of the mentioned businessmen have denied their involvement, such as Tomy Winata and Sugianto Kusuma, who considers it a damaging imagination.

== Impact ==
The existence of the "Nine Dragons" demonstrates the concentration of economic and political power in the hands of a few businessmen. Their dominance is reflected in various important sectors such as banking, real estate, manufacturing, and retail. The "Nine Dragons" are considered to have made significant contributions to Indonesia's economic growth, especially during the New Order era, with their massive investments in various sectors. However, their dominance has also raised concerns about monopolistic practices, economic inequality, environmental damages, and lack of fair competition.

=== Criticism and controversies ===
Despite its contribution to national economy, the existence of "Nine Dragons" has gained much controversies surrounding it with many allegations of unethical business practices and the usage of law enforcements and criminal groups to ease their business interests. Tomy Winata has long been accused of using his political and military connections to secure his business interest. The accusation against Winata came when he was accused of using law enforcers to blackmail the former Board of Directors of Bank Arta Prima due to his connection with Bank Indonesia officials. Winata would deny the allegations during his interview with Tempo and said that he does not blackmail other businesspeople.

Aside from the usage of law enforcement, the usage of land mafia also being highlighted lately. Sugianto Kusuma was accused of hiring land mafias in order to secure land to develop Pantai Indah Kapuk 2 that is located in Teluknaga, Tangerang. A local resident Charlie Chandra reported to the authorities about the allegations of the land mafia use to take over his land that was inherited from his parents. Chandra would later be arrested for allegations of faking the land certificate he showed when making reports.

In the midst of Meikarta scandal, James Riady and Lippo Group became a subject of a book called 'The Lippo Way' that was never published physically. The book mostly cover the unethical business practices done by Riady such as the acquisition of Matahari Department Store and Suara Pembaruan as well as well as allegations of land grab to develop Kemang Village. In 2018, human rights activist Nelly Rosa Yulhiana Siringo-ringo was sentenced to one year imprisonment for defamation after she shared 'The Lippo Way' on her Facebook account.

=== Countermeasures ===
Recent economic trends in Indonesia had seen the rise of non-Chinese conglomerates that many Indonesians believed can counter the influence of the Nine Dragons. These conglomerates stemmed their influence away from Jakarta and in their own lands and had the wealth that could equal or even rivaled the Nine Dragons. They came from areas rich of natural resources and they were dubbed as the Nine Hajjis. The honorific title of Hajji given to them not only shows their religious status, but also as a symbol of rural economic growth. The term was coined by Mardigu Wowiek Prasantyo and the names he mentioned were:

- Abdul Rasyid/Haji Rasyid (Citra Borneo Indah Group)
- Abdussamad Sulaiman/Haji Leman (Hasnur Group)
- Andi Syamduddin Arsyad/Haji Isam (Jhonlin Group)
- Aksa Mahmud/Haji Aksa (Bosowa Corp)
- Jusuf Kalla/Haji Kalla (Kalla Group)
- Muhammad Hatta/Haji Hatta (Gunung Mulia Binuang)
- Musannif/Haji Anif (Anugerah Langkat Makmur)
- Robert Nitiyudo Wachjo/Haji Robert (Nusa Halmahera Minerals)
- Zaini Mahdi/Haji Ijai (Batu Gunung Mulia)

== See also ==
- Chaebol
- Cronies of Ferdinand Marcos
- Four big families of Hong Kong
- Four big families of the Republic of China
- Zaibatsu
- Russian oligarchs
- White monopoly capital
- Conglomerate (company)
- Family business
- Bamboo network
- Gang of Four (Indonesia)
