= List of Indonesians by net worth =

This is a list of Indonesians ordered by their net worth. According to Forbes (2007), there were only two Indonesians who were listed among the world's billionaires. Robert Budi Hartono (and family) was ranked 664th with a total net worth of US$1.5 billion. They made profit from kretek (clove cigarettes) company Djarum and their shares in Bank Central Asia, respectively.

== 2025 Indonesia's 50 Richest People ==
Indonesia's 50 richest people and their net worth
Rank	Name	Net worth (U.S. Dollars billions)	Residence	Source of wealth
1	Robert Budi Hartono and Michael Hartono	43.8	Kudus	Bank Central Asia, Djarum, Blibli
2	Prajogo Pangestu	39.8	Jakarta	Barito Pacific Group, Chandra Asri Pacific
3	Widjaja family	28.3	Jakarta	Sinar Mas Group
4	Low Tuck Kwong	24.9	Jakarta	Bayan Resources
5	Anthoni Salim	13.6	Jakarta	Salim Group, First Pacific
6	Otto Toto Sugiri	11.3	Jakarta	DCI Indonesia
7	Tahir	9.8	Jakarta	Mayapada
8	Marina Budiman	8.2	Jakarta	DCI Indonesia
9	Wijono Tanoko and Hermanto Tanoko	8.1	Surabaya	Avia Avian
10	Sri Prakash Lohia	8	London	Indorama Corporation
11	Haryanto Tjiptodihardjo	6.2	Jakarta	Impack Pratama Industri
12	Han Arming Hanafia	5.3	Bogor	DCI Indonesia
13	Agoes Projosasmito	5	Jakarta	Amman Mineral Internasional
14	Lim Hariyanto Wijaya Sarwono	4.9	Jakarta	Harita Group, Cita Mineral Investindo
15	Theodore Rachmat	4.45	Jakarta	AlamTri Resources
16	Chairul Tanjung	4.4	Jakarta	CT Corp
17	Dewi Kam	4.3	Jakarta	Bayan Resources
18	Bachtiar Karim	4.2	Medan	Musim Mas
19	Garibaldi Thohir	3.8	Jakarta	AlamTri Resources
20	Mochtar Riady	3.75	Jakarta	Lippo Group
21	Sukanto Tanoto	3.7	Singapore	Royal Golden Eagle
22	Setiawan family	3.6	Jakarta	Kalbe Farma, Mitra Keluarga
23	Martua Sitorus	3.55	Singapore	Wilmar International
24	Jogi Hendra Atmadja	3.5	Jakarta	Mayora Indah
25	Susilo Wonowidjojo	3.2	Surabaya	Gudang Garam
26	Peter Sondakh	3.1	Surabaya	Rajawali Corpora
27	Ciliandra Fangiono	3.05	Jakarta	First Resources
28	Hilmi Panigoro	2.9	Jakarta	MedcoEnergi
29	Sjamsul Nursalim	2.8	Singapore	Mitra Adiperkasa
30	Djoko Susanto	2.7	Jakarta	Alfamart
31	Manoj Punjabi	2.6	Jakarta	MD Media
32	Putera Sampoerna	2.5	Jakarta	Sampoerna
33	Arini Subianto	2.4	Jakarta	AlamTri Resources
34	Bambang Sutantio	2.35	Jakarta	Cimory Group
35	Alexander Ramlie	2.3	Jakarta	Amman Mineral Internasional
36	Eddy Kusnadi Sariaatmadja	1.8	Jakarta	Emtek
37	Hamami family	1.7	Jakarta	Tiara Marga Trakindo
38	Ciputra family	1.6	Jakarta	Ciputra Group
39	Husodo Angkosubroto	1.5	Jakarta	Gunung Sewu Group
40	Sulistyo family	1.45	Jakarta	Fajar Surya Wisesa
41	Jenny Quantero and Engki Wibowo	1.4	Jakarta	Bayan Resources
42	Soegiarto Adikoesoemo	1.35	Surabaya	AKR Corporindo
43	Lim Chai Hock	1.3	Balikpapan	Bayan Resources
44	Siti Hartati Murdaya	1.25	Jakarta	Central Cipta Murdaya
45	Edwin Soeryadjaya	1.2	Jakarta	Saratoga Investama Sedaya
46	Irwan Hidayat	1.15	Jakarta	Sido Muncul
47	Eddy Sugianto	1.1	Jakarta	Prima Andalan Mandiri
48	Hary Tanoesoedibjo	1	Jakarta	Media Nusantara Citra
49	Eddy Katuari	0.995	Surabaya	Wings
50	Husain Djojonegoro	0.92	Jakarta	Orang Tua

Source: Forbes Magazine (2025)

== See also ==
- List of Southeast Asian people by net worth
