= Adikoesoemo =

Adikoesoemo is a surname. Notable people with the surname include:

- Haryanto Adikoesoemo (born 1962), Indonesian businessman and art collector, son of Soegiarto
- Soegiarto Adikoesoemo (born 1938/39), Indonesian billionaire businessman
