= Newmont Nusa Tenggara =

Indonesian mining company

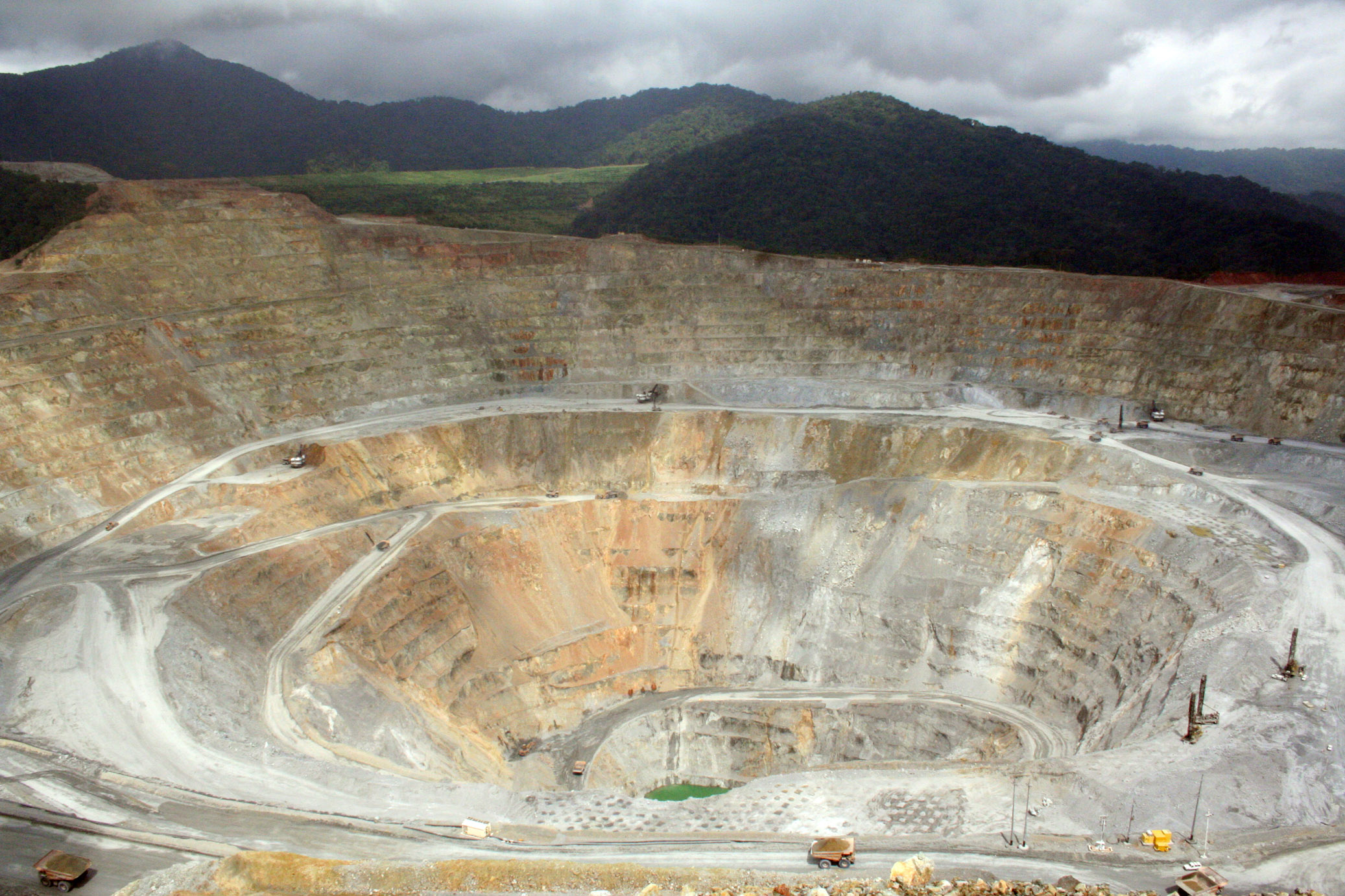
The Batu Hijau mine from the viewing platform

PT Newmont Nusa Tenggara is a subsidiary company of Newmont Mining Corporation that operates their Batu Hijau mine in Indonesia on the island of Sumbawa.

Newmont holds a 45% stake in the company while the Sumitomo Corporation from Japan holds an additional 35% and Indonesian company P.T. Pukuafu Indah holds the remaining 20%. Newmont and Sumitomo are required to divest 51% of their stake in the joint venture Indonesian parties by 2010 by the agreement signed under the Indonesian government of Suharto. The Indonesian government declined to purchase 10% of the company between 2006 & 2007 because of lack of funds, and Newmont declined to sell to local governments because the governments were backed by unnamed private parties, and Newmont wished to have more control over potential buyers. In 2008 Newmont sold a 2% stake in P.T. Newmont to the local governments in Sumbawa.

== Award ==
The company received the Aditama Award in 2011, as the best mining company in terms of mineral mining environment management.
