= Artha Graha Peduli Foundation =

Indonesian philanthropic organization

- Type: Social, humanitarian, environmental
- Founded: 2010
- Founder: Tomy Winata
- Headquarters: Artha Graha Building Jl. Pangeran Jayakarta 115; Jakarta, Indonesia
- Website: www.arthagrahapeduli.org

The Artha Graha Peduli Foundation (AGP Foundation) is an Indonesian social, humanitarian, environmental and philanthropic foundation whose activities began during the 1990s. It was founded in 2010 by Tomy Winata, an Indonesian businessman and philanthropist with a vision "to be able to feed at least three million people throughout Indonesia". The foundation focuses on environmental activities to mitigate the effects of global climate change.

== Foundation Activities ==
The social, humanitarian and environmental activities of Artha Graha Peduli began in Jakarta and other parts of Indonesia and was organized by employees of the Artha Graha group of companies and the Artha Graha Network, owned by Winata. Activities include the weekly (since the 1990s) Beras Jumat-an program (Friday Rice Donation), providing food for poor residents of Jakarta and other parts of Indonesia, disaster relief and environmental activities.

In 2010 the Artha Graha Network formed a non-profit organization, the Artha Graha Peduli Foundation, with five main activities: disaster relief, education and health, environmental activities, support for small and medium enterprises (SMEs) and legal aid for the poor. The foundation's philosophy is that it is privately owned to help the public.

The AGP Foundation has participated in relief efforts following the Aceh tsunami, the 2010 eruptions of Mount Merapi, the 2009 Sumatra earthquakes, the Rokatenda and Lokon-Empung eruptions, landslides in Wasior and the Jember and Tasikmalaya Regencies, floods in Jakarta and fires. Aid has been provided to Atambua (bordering East Timor), Merauke (near the border with Papua New Guinea), Nunukan Regency (bordering Malaysia), Rote Island and Miangas.

Since 2004, the foundation has encouraged the cultivation of hybrid paddy to increase productivity. The November 2008 harvest in Sukabumi Regency set a record of about 16 tons per hectare. Indonesian President Susilo Bambang Yudhoyono, First Lady Ani Bambang Yudhoyono and several government ministers attended the harvest festival. The foundation supplied aid in the wake of the March 2011 Tōhoku earthquake and tsunami.

In 2015 the AGP Foundation held a low-cost Ramadan market in Indramayu, Indonesia in order to give the local poor population access to cheap meat and basic foods towards the Eid-ul-Fitr holidays.

In 2016, the foundation started performing eye-checks and free cataract surgeries in Bali as part of the AGP team outreach.

== Environmental activities ==
Since 1997 the foundation has run Tambling Wildlife Nature Conservation (TWNC), a tiger-rescue center which attempts to reintroduce "conflict tigers" (tigers who have attacked, or killed, humans) into the wild. The TWNC has released five Sumatran tigers (a critically endangered species) into its forest.

The TWNC has 45,000 hectares (110,000 acres) of forest and 14,500 hectares (36,000 acres) of sea-conservation area. Representatives the United Nations Office on Drugs and Crime (UNODC) have visited the sanctuary, which conducts a drug-rehabilitation program in cooperation with Badan Narkotika Nasional (BNN, the Indonesian Narcotics Institution). The program, which encourages former addicts to work in conservation and eco-tourism, was presented by Winata to the 2013 UNODC annual meeting in Vienna. UNODC executive director Yuri Fedotov expressed his appreciation for the program, saying that his office would encourage other countries to learn from it.

In March 2013 in Madrid, Winata appointed Cristiano Ronaldo "Ambassador of Mangroves". He and Ronaldo agreed to plant and conserve existing mangroves, particularly in Bali. The Bali Mangrove Care Forum's motto is "Save Mangroves, Save Earth".
