= Lee Shin Cheng =

Malaysian businessman (1939–2019)

Yang Berbahagia Tan Sri Dato' Lee Shin Cheng 李深靜
- Born: 3 June 1939; Kuala Lumpur, Malaysia
- Died: 1 June 2019 (aged 79)
- Citizenship: Malaysian

Lee Shin Cheng
- Traditional Chinese: 李深靜
- Simplified Chinese: 李深静
Transcriptions
Standard Mandarin
- Hanyu Pinyin: Li Shēnjìng
Yue: Cantonese
- Jyutping: Lei5 Sam1 Zing6
Southern Min
- Hokkien POJ: Lí Chhim-chēng
- Tâi-lô: Lí Tshim-tsīng

Lee Shin Cheng (3 June 1939 – 1 June 2019) was a Malaysian business magnate, investor, and philanthropist. Lee Shin Cheng headed IOI Corporation Berhad, better known as IOI Group, as its executive chairman. IOI is a conglomerate managing oil palm plantations, producing specialty fats and oleochemicals, and is developing properties in Malaysia, Indonesia, the United States, and Europe. The IOI refinery in Rotterdam, Netherlands is the largest palm oil refinery in Europe. IOI's oil palm plantations in Malaysia and Indonesia produce palm oil and palm kernel oil. These oils are made into specialty oils, metallic stearates and fats that are used in soaps, detergents, cosmetics and food additives. IOI Group is a leading real estate developer in Malaysia. Projects include townships, shopping malls, condominiums, office towers, and resorts.

== Early life ==
Lee grew up northeast of Kuala Lumpur on a rubber plantation, where his father ran a small Chinese food shop. He left school at the age of 11 to help support his family, selling ice cream on a bicycle for four years before returning to finish high school. At the age of 22, he sought work with the Dunlop Estate—a European-owned oil palm plantation company—for a supervisory job, but was turned down as he did not speak English fluently. He went on to get a field supervisor's job with at another palm oil company.

Twenty years later, Lee bought Dunlop Estate. In 2008, he recalled the happiest day of his life in an interview with the New Straits Times, saying, "My happiest day was in 1989 when I bought Dunlop Estate from Multi-Purpose Holdings Bhd. This was because during the late 1960s, I had applied for a job at Dunlop Estate but they did not employ me because I was not adequately qualified. If they had employed me, I would probably not have owned the entire asset of Dunlop Estate today. This purchase marked a significant milestone in my life".

== Tree whisperer ==
Lee adopted a hands-on managerial style and focused on maximizing palm oil yields. Lee's walkabouts on IOI's 152,000 hectares of oil palm plantations in Malaysia and Indonesia earned him the "tree talker" moniker among journalists, rival plantation companies, and bankers in Malaysia.

At an awards reception speech in July 2009, Lee remarked on his moniker, saying, "I am always quoted as talking to the trees, so it looks like I have to continue talking to the trees to get another award". https://www.popularonline.com.my/default/catalog/product/view/id/198254/s/9789672949206/?did=67.

== Family ==
Lee has two sons and four daughters. All were trained as lawyers. Lee and his family's control of IOI is held via Progressive Holdings Sdn Bhd. Although all six of Lee's children work in the company holding managerial positions, sons Dato' Lee Yeow Chor and Lee Yeow Seng are more prominent by virtue of their presence on IOI's board of directors.

His youngest son Lee Yeow Seng married Yeo Bee Yin, the Minister of Energy, Science, Technology, Environment and Climate Change on 11 March 2019.

== Financial worth ==
In 2009, Lee was reported to be Malaysia's third richest person and the world's 234th richest person. His net worth was then reported to be US$3.2 billion by Forbes.

In 2019, his position dropped to the fifth spot on the list, as his wealth fell by US$200 million to US$5.4 billion (RM22 billion).

== Social contributions ==
Lee was given the FIABCI Malaysia Property Man of the Year award in 2001. In February 2002, he was conferred an honorary doctorate degree in agriculture by Universiti Putra Malaysia in recognition of his contributions to the palm oil industry.

Lee served as a board member of Universiti Putra Malaysia, an adviser to the KL & Selangor Chinese Chamber of Commerce and Industry, a council member of the Malaysian Palm Oil Association (MPOA), a member of the Malaysia-China Business Council, the honorary president of the Association of Eng Choon Societies of Malaysia, and the Federation of Hokkien Association of Malaysia.

Since 1998, Lee has provided scholarships and educational grants to students via IOI Foundation (formerly known as Yayasan Tan Sri Dato’ Lee Shin Cheng).

Lee has contributed RM27.5 million in building a school in Puchong, which changed its name to "SJKC Shin Cheng (Harcroft) in August 2016.

== Death ==
Lee died on 1 June 2019, two days shy of his 80th birthday.

== Honours ==
=== Honours of Malaysia ===
- Malaysia
  - Commander of the Order of Loyalty to the Crown of Malaysia (PSM) – Tan Sri (1993)
