= Bumitama Agri =

Company of Indonesia

Bumitama Agri Ltd
- Type: Public (SGX: P8Z )
- Industry: Food processing
- Founded: 1996
- Key people: Lim Gunawan Hariyanto
- Products: Crude palm oil, palm kernel
- Revenue: ▲USD 634 million (2020)
- Net income: ▲USD 95 million (2020)
- Total assets: ▲USD 1.27 billion (2020)
- Total equity: ▲USD 734 million (2020)
- Number of employees: 31,400
- Subsidiaries: Bumitama Gunajaya Agro
- Website: http://www.bumitama-agri.com/

Bumitama Agri Limited is a Singapore-based holding company for Bumitama Gunajaya Agro, an Indonesian oil palm plantation company engaged in the cultivation of oil palm trees and the production of crude palm oil (CPO). It was established in 1996 by the Harita Group with its first acquisition of land in Central Kalimantan. Bumitama owns roughly 230,000 hectares and has planted 187,000 hectares of oil palm trees, primarily in Central and West Kalimantan. Bumitama owns 14 CPO mills (13 in Kalimantan and 1 in Riau), which produce more than 1,000,000 tons of CPO a year. Primary purchasers of their CPO include Wilmar International, the Sinar Mas Group and Musim Mas. In April 2012, Bumitama Agri presented an IPO on the Singapore Stock Exchange.

== History ==
Bumitama is part of the Harita Group, which was founded in 1915 by Lim Tju King. His son, Lim Hariyanto Wijaya Sarwono (President and Chair of Harita Group), took over and developed a timber business. He built a small factory and began manufacturing plywood in 1983.

With the help of his two sons, Lim Gunawan Hariyanto (CEO of Harita Group) and Gunardi Hariyanto Lim (Deputy CEO of Harita Group), the Group entered the coal mining industry through the 1985 Kelian Equatorial Mining gold project (a joint venture, Rio Tinto owned 90% and the Harita Group 10%) and the 1988 Lanna Harita coal project.

In 1996, Bumitama was established by the Harita Group with its acquisition of 17,500 hectares in Central Kalimantan and the company began its through acquisitions, and by 2007 Bumitama had 50,000 hectares of planted area. As of March 2012, just before the IPO, Bumitama had 118,000 hectares of planted area. For comparison, Singapore (where Bumitama is publicly traded) covers roughly 69,300 hectares (693 km^{2}).

In 2007, IOI Corporation bought 33% of PT Bumitama Gunajaya Agro as part of its plan for strategic investment in Indonesia. Bumitama would benefit from IOI's technical expertise and management support, since IOI has operations throughout the palm oil supply chain and markets in more than 65 countries.

== Business ==
=== Land bank and plantations ===
Bumitama's primary business is cultivating oil palm trees, harvesting fresh fruit bunches (FFB) and processing it into crude palm oil, and the company owns roughly 230,000 hectares of land in Central and West Kalimantan. Of this, 187,000 hectares have been planted on and nearly 40,000 hectares are dedicated to conservation. In 2020 Bumitama's plantations produced 3,314,128 metric tons of FFB, and had a FFB yield of 19 metric tons per hectare. The company generally transports its harvested FFB to the CPO mills within 24 hours to ensure maximum freshness and yield.

=== CPO Mills ===
Bumitama owns 14 CPO mills in Kalimantan and Riau, with a combined FFB processing capacity of 5,850,000 tons per year. In 2019 the company's CPO mills had an average oil-extraction rate (extracted CPO per unit of FFB) of 23%, one of the highest in the industry.

== Sustainability and corporate social responsibility ==
=== Education ===
As of 2020 the group has developed 38 schools in Central Kalimantan, West Kalimantan and Riau, and provides scholarships for elementary- to tertiary-level students and sponsors training for teachers and principals. There are almost 5,300 students enrolled at Bumitama schools and the company provides free tuition, books, and school-bus transportation to all students at these schools.

=== Medical care ===
Since 2004, Bumitama has provided free medical services to employees and community residents by building medical centers and supplying drugs and doctors. The company sponsors periodic basic medical check-ups and medication from local doctors.

=== Bumitama Biodiversity and Community Project (BBCP) ===
Bumitama collaborated with IDH – the Sustainable Trade Initiative to develop the BBCP. The programme was established in 2016 to conserve areas in a subsidiary, PT Gemilang Makmur Subur (GMS). Bornean orangutans and other rare species thrive in the landscape and the aim of this project was to create a wildlife biodiversity migration corridor between the Sungai Putri peat swamp forest and the protected Gunung Tarak forest that directly links Gunung Palung National Park. Bumitama acquired PT Damai Agro Sejahtera (PT DAS) and immediately released a stop work order to prevent further destructive land clearing. Assessments were conducted with the help and support of expert organisations and these confirmed the existence of habitats of high-conservation species and carbon stocks. These were set-aside to be managed under the BBCP, enhancing and protecting the landscape’s biodiversity. Bumitama is also working with PONGO Alliance to explore new concepts in orangutan habitat management.

=== Roundtable on Sustainable Palm Oil ===
Bumitama has been a member of the Roundtable on Sustainable Palm Oil (RSPO) since October 2007. The RSPO is a non-profit organization formed in 2004 to promote the growth and use of sustainable oil-palm products with credible global standards and shareholder engagement.

== Initial public offering ==
On 12 April 2012, Bumitama launched its initial public offering on the Singapore Stock Exchange. HSBC and DBS Bank were bookrunners for the IPO.

A total of 327,324,000 shares (297,570,000 shares and an additional 29,754,000 in greenshoe) were issued during the listing. During the book building phase the IPO was reportedly 31 times oversubscribed, the highest by any IPO in Singapore since 2007.

Bumitama's shares were priced at $0.745 for the IPO. On its first day of trading the stock closed at $0.98, 32 percent above its IPO price, valuing Bumitama's market capitalization at 1.7 billion Singapore dollars. Cornerstone investors for the IPO were Wilmar International, UOB Asset Management, Value Partners Hong Kong, Hwang Investment Management and Target Asset Management.

== Management ==
1. Lim Gunawan Hariyanto - Executive Chairman and Chief Executive Officer
2. Lim Christina Hariyanto - Executive Director
3. Sie Eddy Kurniawan - Chief Financial Officer
4. Roebbianto - Chief Operating Officer
5. Lim Sian Choo - Chief Sustainability Officer
