= IOI Group =

Malaysian conglomerate

IOI Corporation Berhad

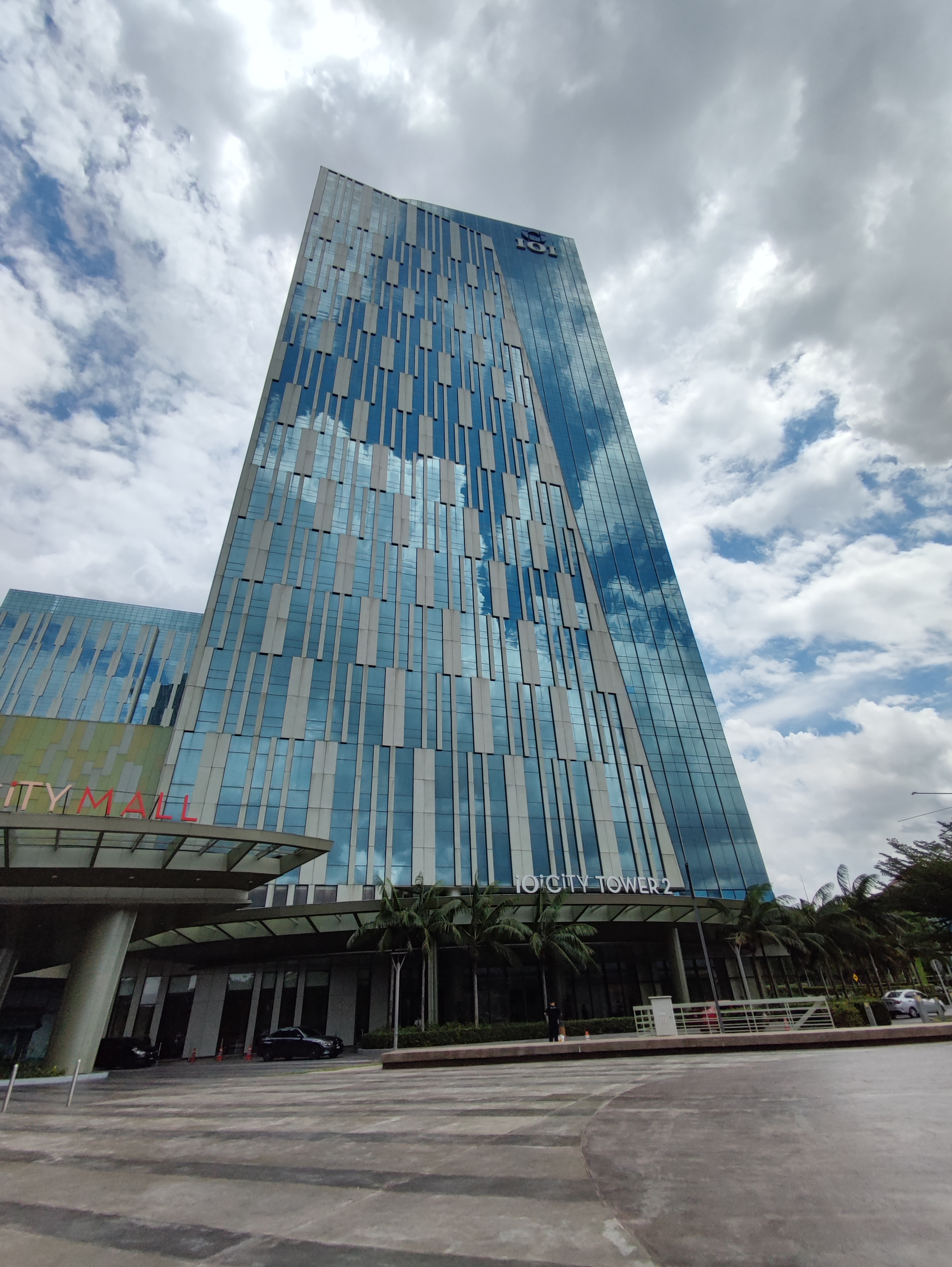
- IOI City Tower 2
- Type: Public limited company
- Traded as: MYX: 1961
- ISIN: MYL1961OO001
- Industry: palm oil; chemical manufacturing; property development; investment; resort management
- Founded: 1969
- Founder: Lee Shin Cheng
- Headquarters: IOI City Tower 2, IOI Resort City, 62502 Putrajaya, Malaysia
- Area served: Southeast Asia
- Key people: Lee Yeow Chor(Chief Executive Officer); Tan Sri Peter Chin Fah Kui(Chairman)
- Revenue: ▼RM 11.58 billion(2023); RM 15.58 billion(2022)
- Operating income: ▼RM 1.82 billion(2023); RM 2.5 billion(2022)
- Net income: ▼RM 1.13 billion(2023); RM 1.77 billion(2022)
- Total assets: ▼RM 17.58 billion(2023); RM 19.17 billion(2022)
- Total equity: ▲RM 11.33 billion(2023); RM 10.94 billion(2022)
- Number of employees: 30,000
- Subsidiaries: IOI Plantation; IOI Management; IOI Commodity Trading; IOI Palm Biotech; IOI Investment; IOI Ventures; IOI Biofuel
- Website: www.ioigroup.com

IOI Corporation Berhad, commonly referred to as IOI, was incorporated on 31 October 1969 as Industrial Oxygen Incorporated Sdn Bhd. IOI is one of Malaysia's biggest conglomerates. It ventured into oil palm plantations in 1983, followed by property development in 1984 and refineries in 1997. IOI was listed on the Kuala Lumpur Stock Exchange (KLSE) and trading as MYX: 1961 – now known as Bursa Malaysia – in 1980.

The group was founded and headed by Lee Shin Cheng, the executive chairman, until his death in 2019. Lee Yeow Chor is currently the chief executive.

Its diverse businesses extend from the upstream plantation in Malaysia and Indonesia, to downstream manufacturing of oleochemicals, specialty oils and fats which are exported to over 70 countries.

== Core businesses ==
=== Palm oil plantations ===
Palm oil plantations are IOI's biggest income generator. As of 2023, about 63 percent of the conglomerate's profits came from its oil palm plantations. The group has more than 200,000 hectares of oil palm plantations in Malaysia and Indonesia. IOI extended its activities to Indonesia in 2007, one of its associate companies in Indonesia is Bumitama Gunajaya Agro. It has 15 palm oil mills and 98 estates throughout Malaysia and Indonesia.

With oil yield of some six tonnes per hectare per year at its mature estates, IOI is the most efficient plantation company in the world. Malaysia's oil palm average yield for the last 20 years has been stagnant at four tonnes per hectare per year.

=== Real estate ===
IOI develops real estate and makes property investments in commercial, hospitality and leisure, launching its maiden 930-acre Bandar Puchong Jaya township in 1990. IOI announced a demerger of its property businesses in 2013, and relisted it on its own as IOI Properties Group Berhad on the Main Market of Bursa Malaysia on 15 January 2014.

=== Oleochemicals and speciality fats ===
IOI is the largest vegetable oil-based oleochemical manufacturer in Asia – held under wholly owned entities IOI Oleochemical Industries Bhd and Pan Century Oleochemical Sdn Bhd with a combined capacity of over 890,000 MT per annum. In 2021, IOI was ranked 8th on the Global Top 30 Specialty Oil Companies list.

These plants produce fatty acids and esters, glycerine, soap noodles, fatty alcohols, and metallic stearates. These have various industrial applications in the production of food, pharmaceutical, cosmetics, personal care, home care, industrial detergent-surfactants and lubricant products.

IOI's specialty fats businesses are operated by its 20%-owned associate Bunge Loders Croklaan (formerly IOI Loders Croklaan), with manufacturing facilities in the Netherlands, North America, and in Malaysia (with a combined production capacity of more than a million tonnes per year). Bunge Loders Croklaan's customer base includes global food giants like Unilever, Nestle, Cadbury and Kraft. Speciality fats are used in pastries, confectionery, snack foods, and ready-to-eat meals.

=== Refineries ===
IOI owns 2 refineries in Malaysia, with a combined capacity of 1.80 million MT per annum.

== Critics ==
Greenpeace first documented the destruction of orangutan habitat and peatland forest in the 2008 report Burning up Borneo, followed by a second report in 2015, Under Fire. The company also faced allegations in 2014 from Finnish NGO Finnwatch of serious labour issues on its Malaysian plantations, like confiscating workers' passports, providing contracts in unfamiliar language, restricting freedom of association and paying salaries below the minimum wage. In September 2016, Greenpeace published a damning indictment of IOI entitled, A Deadly Trade-Off; IOI's Palm Oil Supply and its Human and Environmental Costs. On 27 September 2016, Greenpeace blockaded the IOI refinery in the Netherlands to force IOI to adopt a more sustainable plantation policy.

IOI is a co-founder of the Roundtable on Sustainable Palm Oil (RSPO) and has played an active role in shaping the scheme. The company has several of its estates in Malaysia certified as complying with RSPO standards. According to Friends of the Earth in March 2010, IOI Corporation failed to live up to its claims of green stewardship. Following a complaint filed by AidEnvironment in April 2015, the RSPO certificates of the IOI Group were suspended as of 1 April 2016. In response, many consumer companies like Unilever, Nestlé and Mars cancelled contracts with the company. IOI was reinstated in August 2016 by RSPO after it was judged to have fulfilled the group's demands to improve its environmental performance. In 2017, Greenpeace suspended its active campaign against IOI. IOI addressed Finnwatch's allegation of labour rights issue in 2014 and 2021.
