= Artha Graha Network =

Company of Indonesia

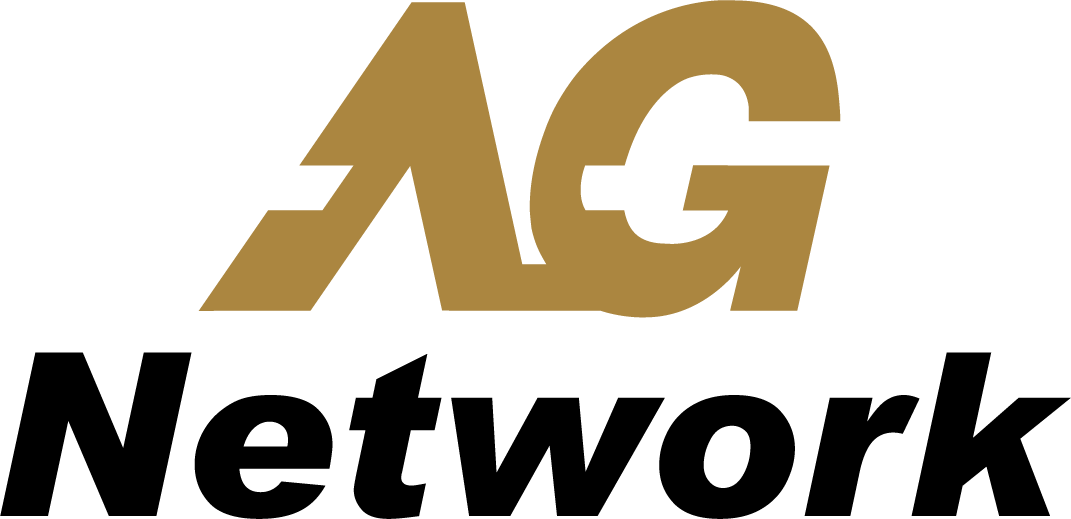
- Type: Private
- Industry: Conglomerate
- Founded: 1989; 37 years ago
- Founder: Tomy Winata
- Headquarters: Jakarta, Indonesia
- Key people: Tomy Winata; Kiki Syahnakri; Sugianto Kusuma
- Products: Real estate, media, telecommunications, electronics, property, finance, health, education
- Services: Financial services, property development, construction, insurance, mining, telecommunication
- Website: arthagraha.net

Artha Graha Network (shortened as AG Network), also known as Artha Graha Group, is an Indonesian conglomerate founded by Tomy Winata and Armed Forces Foundation (with the help of Tomy business partner, Sugianto Kusuma). The business mainly focused on real estate, financial, agrobusiness, hotel, mining, entertainment media, retail, technology, and others.

== History ==
This group started from a bank called Bank Artha Graha (different from the new Bank Artha Graha Internasional, because this bank was previously called Bank Interpacific). Bank Artha Graha was originally called Bank Propelat which was owned by one of the Indonesian Armed Forces foundations, namely the Siliwangi Foundation in West Java.

In 1986, Bank Propelat experienced financial difficulties and was almost closed by Minister of Finance Radius Prawiro . Facing this difficulty, Indonesian armed forces then asked for help from a Chinese businessman from Pontianak , named Tomy Winata. Coincidentally, several senior armed forces officials (especially the army) such as T. B. Silalahi and Edi Sudradjat knew this young entrepreneur, who initially only worked as a contractor and supplier of various Army needs in West Kalimantan. Tomy then agreed to this, and in 1989 Tomy, with assistance from his colleague, namely Sugianto Kusuma, whom he met after he moved to Jakarta in 1983. acquired and restored this bank. Winata and Kusuma got 60% of the shares, while another foundation which is also under Indonesian armed forces control, namely the Kartika Eka Paksi Foundation (YKEP) got the remaining 40%. The money all came from Winata's pocket, while the armed forces did not spend a single cent. On May 16 1989, Bank Propelat changed its name to Bank Artha Graha, and under Winata's control, the bank became healthy and began to expand into various fields and regions. The name Artha Graha means house of money, which Winata probably took from the name of his adoptive parent in Sukabumi named Bisri Artawinata.

Since then, Winata business with the armed forces runs well. Winata contacted any infantery from the armed forces for the project, but later partnered with its foundation for bigger projects. With the support from Sudradjat and Silalahi, both were top brass within the armed forces, Winata then expanded its business to real estate business. It was all started in the 1990s, when Artha Graha was involved in state-owned enterprise named Jakarta International Hotels & Development (JIHD) that runs Hotel Borobudur in Jakarta. Next, Artha Graha expanded to build a luxury resort in Bali and Matahari Island, Thousand Islands. But shockingly in 1992, when JIHD acquired a company named Danayasa Arthatama that was in charge of developing the Sudirman Central Business District (SCBD) in Jakarta. At the end of 1990s the project was a massive success with massive skyscrapers being built in the area that existed until today, ranging from Indonesia Stock Exchange building, Bapindo Plaza, Artha Graha Tower, hotels, malls, and luxury. the project estimated to cost US$ 3,25 billion and being developed within the 40 hectares of land, Winata invited Taspen and Danareksa to invest in his new project.

Winata's business that once limited to property and finance expanded to other sectors. In the insurance sector, he acquired Tjahjana Insurance dan and renamed it to Artha Graha General Insurance. In telecommunications, Artha Graha hold ownership stake in PT Danatel Pratama, PT Artha Graha Telekomindo dan Satelindo (via PT Bimagraha Telekomindo), in fisheries, PT Tingsheen Bande Sejahtera, and for electronics, Artha Graha took over a company owned by Winata's business partner, Sugianto Kusuma in television manufacturing like Sony. It was later merged to PT Artha Graha Investama Sentral (later sold to Bhakti Investama and become PT Agis Tbk, then sold to become PT Sigmagold) that committed Initial public offering in the stock exchange. In the aviation industry, Artha Graha acquired Transwisata Prima Aviation, and mass media with Pilar magazine and other sector such as construction. Total companies under the holdings of Artha Graha saat has now reached 40 companies. Not just owning Bank Artha Graha, Winata then acquired two other banks: in 1997 acquired Bank Arta Prima (Then turned into Bank Arta Pratama, and merged with Bank Artha Graha) and Bank Interpacific in 2003, that changed name to Bank Artha Graha Internasional after merger with old Bank Artha Graha that undergo reverse merger.

Even after the 1997 Asian financial crisis, Artha Graha Network keep expanding. Most notably Artha Graha Network used to be sole distributor to Korean car brand Kia (PT Kia Mobil Indonesia) and planned to build marbles min, roads, and palm oil plantation in Morowali, Central Sulawesi. After the 2005 Susilo Bambang Yudhoyono government reform that bar active armed forces members to do businesses, Winata become the sole controller of Artha Graha Network But still hold cordial relations with armed forces personnel who once do business with him such as General Gatot Nurmantyo and Kiki Syahnakri who holds important positions in the Artha Graha Network. In 2006, Winata with AG Network said to be involved in hybrid rice business in partnership with Chinese agrobusiness company Hao Seed Industry Co Ltd.to create new variety of rice from China in Indonesia. Winata also tried to involve in the construction of Sunda Strait Bridge and reclamation of Benoa Bay in Bali that were controversial at the time.

== Business units ==
Artha Graha network was said to own more than 40 unit of businesses. Some few notable businesses owned by Artha Graha Network are the following.

- Bank Artha Graha Internasional
- Arthagraha General Insurance
- Jakarta International Hotels & Development
- Artha Graha Telekomindo
- Pasifik Agro Sentosa
- Danapati Abinaya Investama (Jak TV), joint venture with Mahaka X
- Danatel Pratama
- Danayasa Arthatama
- Electronic City
- Multiagro Pangan Lestari
- Makmur Elok Graha
- Sumber Agro Semesta
- UAF Credit
- Tirta Wahana Bali Internasional
- Qoin Digital Indonesia

Artha Graha also owned several notable properties such as Pacific Place, Menara Global, Sudirman Central Business District, Mal Artha Gading in Jakarta, and Discovery Kartika Plaza Hotel in Bali
