= Tambling Wildlife Nature Conservation =

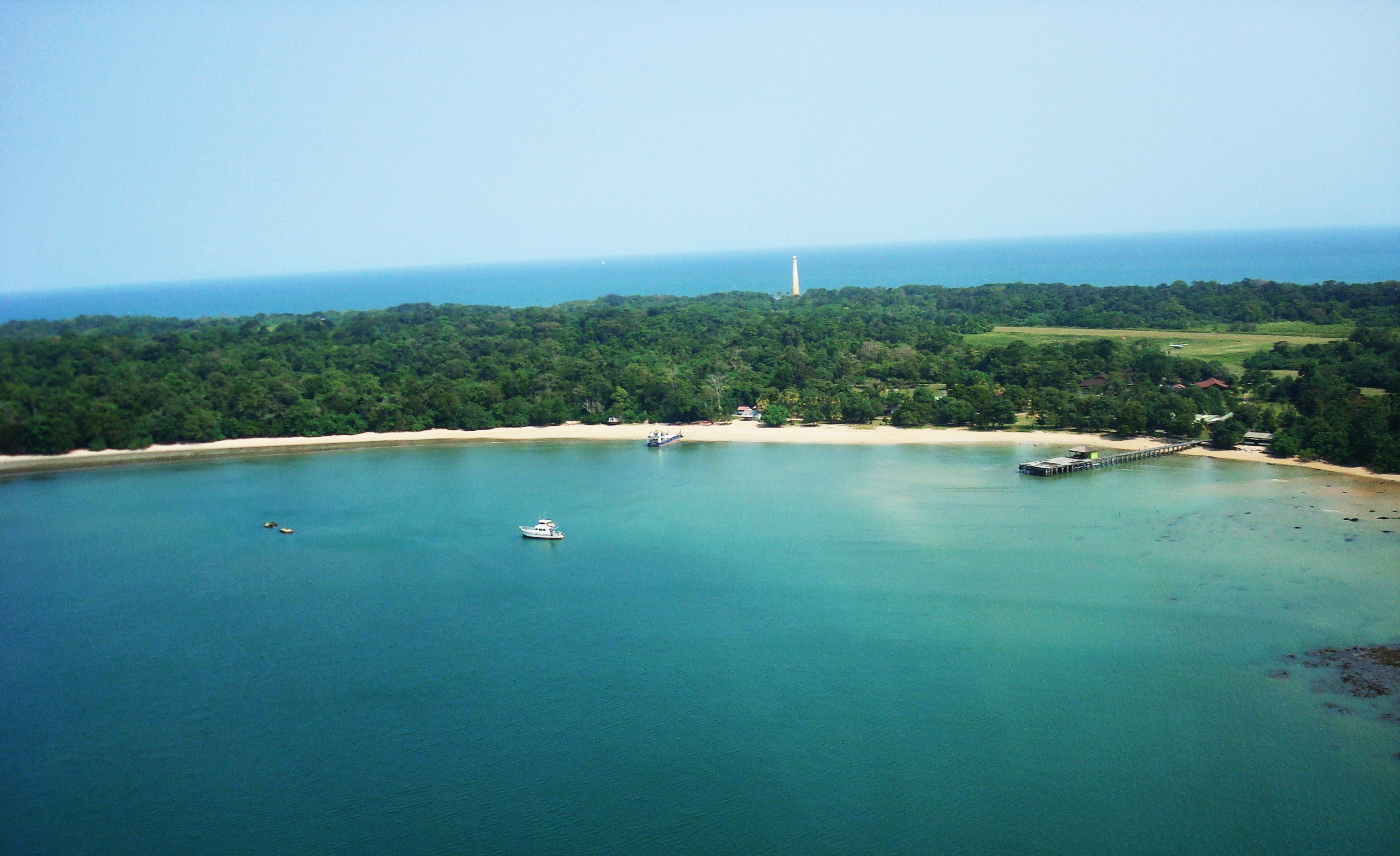

- Location within Sumatra Location within Indonesia
- Location: Sumatra, Indonesia
- Nearest city: Semangka
- Coordinates: 5.916°S 104.556°E
- Area: 45,000 hectares (170 sq mi)
- Website: www.tamblingwildlife.com

Tambling Wildlife Nature Conservation (TWNC) is a 45,000-hectare forest and 14,082-hectare marine conservation area on the southern tip of Sumatra. The area is remote, with no public transportation available. TWNC was founded by Tomy Winata, an Indonesian businessman and philanthropist. Owner and chairman of the Artha Graha Group and Network, Winata also founded the nonprofit Artha Graha Peduli Foundation.

Since 1996 (followed by a 2010 agreement), TWNC has been funded and managed by the foundation. As part of a July 2008 agreement with the Indonesian Ministry of Forestry, TWNC is part of the 365,000-hectare (1,410 sq mi) Bukit Barisan Selatan National Park.

== History ==
The area has experienced illegal activity, including poaching, illegal fishing and unauthorized logging and land use. As a result of these activities, deforestation in the national park has destroyed about 20 percent of the forest. Coral reefs were damaged by an exponential increase in fishing over an approximately 20,000-hectare (77 sq mi) area around the TWNC.

== Forest, wildlife and marine conservation ==
The Go-Green Society began the foundation’s program to restore TWNC in 1998. The recovery progress was relatively slow because of extensive damage caused by illegal activity in the area, and the foundation spent years reducing and stabilizing the rate of deforestation in the conservation area.

Foundation programs and efforts implemented in TWNC include:

- Reforestation, planting more than 10,000 trees of endemic species including waru, bayur (Pterospermum javanicum) and nyamplung since 1998
- Assisting Indonesian forest patrols with additional personnel and equipment to protect TWNC Conservation and provide training and information about conservation to villagers surrounding TWNC.
- Rescue of Sumatran tigers. According to a 2010 WWF-IUCN estimate, the Sumatran tiger population numbers less than 300. The foundation and TWNC are working with Panthera, an international nongovernmental organisation focused on big cats. Since 1998 the foundation and TWNC have moved eight Sumatran tigers, and five have been returned to their natural habitat. In the TWNC area there are 30–40 Sumatran tigers, which are occasionally photographed. In 2011, three cubs were born in the area to rescued Sumatran tigers.
- Return of endangered species, including sea turtles and the Sunda pangolin, to their natural habitats
- A program encouraging local residents to support the foundation’s go-green activities, reversing deforestation
- A drug-rehabilitation program, employing former addicts in conservation-based activities in cooperation with the National Anti-Narcotics Agency (BNN) to reduce the rate of relapse. The program combines drug rehabilitation with TWNC's conservation work, encouraging former addicts to pursue careers in conservation and ecotourism. The program was presented by Winata at the United Nations Office on Drugs and Crime (UNODC) 2013 annual meeting in Vienna.
- A limited ecotourism program, providing biodegradable products and tree-planting activities.

== Forest conservation ==
As indicated by its absence of tigers in conflict, TWNC's natural forest is an example of a complete food chain. Its marine conservation has attracted individual visitors and national and international institutions such as UNESCO, the IUCN, the World Bank, Panthera, and UNODC. In 2012, Kylie Minogue visited Tambling during her visit to Indonesia. Fifteen foreign ambassadors visited TWNC during the 2009 Krakatau Festival. Media outlets, including The New York Times, have visited TWNC.

== Challenges ==
The mantangan plant (Meremia peltata), a flowering vine in the morning glory family which limits trees' access to sunlight, is an environmental challenge. Another challenge is the loss of TWNC's coastal area. Several areas in TWNC have eroded as much as 20 metres (66 ft) due to rising sea levels triggered by global warming. Indonesia had comprised 17,508 islands, but the loss of small islands to rising seawater has reduced its total to about 17,400.

== International support ==
Although it is the third country classified as a "lung of the world", Indonesia faces a challenge in sustaining funding for its conservation activities.

== Award ==
On 16 July 2014 TWNC received an award from Panthera for its success in Sumatran tiger conservation at the annual Tigers Forever meeting in Jakarta.
