= Bumitama Gunajaya Agro =

Species of palm

Bumitama Gunajaya Agro is a palm oil company from South Jakarta, cultivating palm oil trees in Kalimantan. It is a member of Roundtable on Sustainable Palm Oil. The company was founded in 1997. It is a subsidiary of Bumitama Agri Ltd. The Malaysian IOI Group is one of the key investors in their holding company, Bumitama Agri Ltd. Bumitama Gunajaya Agro (BGA) has cleared Borneo rainforest areas, decreasing the habitat of the Orangutans.
