= William Soeryadjaya =

Chinese Indonesian businessman

- Born: Tjia Kian Liong; December 20, 1922; Majalengka, Dutch East Indies
- Died: April 2, 2010 (aged 87); Jakarta, Indonesia
- Occupation: Businessman
- Spouse: Lily Anwar Soeryadjaya (1924-2021, m.1945-2010, his death)
- Children: Edward Soeryadjaya (Tjia Han-Sek); Joyce Soeryadjaya (Tjia May-Ling); Judith Soeryadjaya (Tjia May-Lan)

William Soeryadjaya, also known as Tjia Kian Liong (Chinese: 謝建隆; pinyin: Xiè Jiànlóng; Wade–Giles: Hsieh⁴ Chien⁴-lung²; 20 December 1922 – 2 April 2010), also known as Om (Uncle) William, was a Chinese Indonesian businessman who co-founded Astra International, Indonesia's largest conglomerate.

He lost his parents at the age of 12 and had to cease his education at 19; despite that he continued his education by studying at Leder & Schoenindustrie in the Netherlands.

Soeryadjaya co-founded Astra in 1957, then a trading company, with his younger brother Tjia Kian Tie. The company grew to become Indonesia's largest automobile retailer and the country's biggest company by market value. The company, which also owns finance, plantation, auto parts manufacturing, automotive businesses, and heavy machinery and mining services, sells Honda motorcycles, BMW, Daihatsu, Peugeot, Citroën and Toyota vehicles throughout Indonesia. In March 2010, Astra overtook Telkom Indonesia to become Indonesia's most valuable company.

Soeryadjaya lost control of Astra in 1992, when he sold most of his family's shares to rescue Summa Bank, which was owned by his eldest son Edward Soeryadjaya, that had suffered from a credit crisis and finally collapsed. He personally guaranteed all Summa Bank depositors their money back, and all depositors received their money back with interest without using any bailout package from the government at the expense of his ownership in Astra.

In 2009, Forbes magazine rated the Soeryadjaya family as Indonesia's 18th-wealthiest family.

William Soeryadjaya died in Jakarta on 2 April 2010, at the age of 87 and was buried in San Diego Hills in the following days.

== Legacy ==
One of the buildings in Universitas Prasetiya Mulya's BSD Campus is named after him. Universitas Kristen Indonesia also has a building called Graha William Soeryadjaya.
