= Tomy Winata =

Indonesian businessman

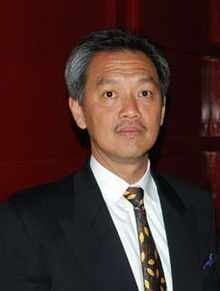
- Born: Guo Shuo Feng 郭說鋒; 23 July 1958 (age 68); Pontianak, Indonesia
- Occupations: Entrepreneur; philanthropist
- Known for: Founder of Artha Graha Network and Artha Graha Peduli Foundation

Tomy Winata (Indonesian pronunciation: [ˌt̪omi wiˈnat̪a] and sometimes misspelled as Tommy Winata; born Guo Shuo Feng, Chinese: 郭說鋒 on 23 July 1958) is an Indonesian businessman with interests in banking, property, and infrastructure, whose wealth comes from his business deals for the Indonesian Military. His philanthropic interests include the environment, particularly the Tambling Wildlife Nature Conservation a 45,000 hectare forest, endangered wildlife and sea conservation area, located in southern Sumatra.

In 2006, he was listed as #35 on a Forbes list of "Indonesia's 40 richest", with net worth of $110 million In 2016, he was ranked 43rd on GlobeAsia's list of 150 Richest Indonesians, with wealth of $900 million.

== Early life ==
Winata was born on 23 July 1958 in Pontianak, West Kalimantan. There are conflicting versions of his early life. One claim is that he is the son of an automobile spare parts trader and left school in the seventh grade upon which he sold ice pops to support his family. According to The Washington Post, he started out as a "car washer and office boy". Indonesian media reports have said Winata came from a poor family and was orphaned in his early childhood. Author Sam Setyautama wrote that Winata had an adoptive father named Bisri Artawinata, who was a village head in Takokak, Sukabumi, West Java. Conversely, author Joe Studwell wrote that Winata's "father built barracks for the Army although Winata prefers to say he got his start selling ice lollies and washing cars".

== Business career ==
A widely copied online biographical spiel states that in 1972 when aged 15, Winata was introduced to the chief of Singkawang Subdistrict Military Command in West Kalimantan, resulting in him being asked to build an office for the military. The online biography states his business relationship with the military grew and he was asked to build barracks and Army schools, and distribute goods to provincial Army headquarters in places such as Irian Jaya, Ujungpandang and Ambon. Tempo magazine in 1999 reported that Tommy started his business when 15 years old after receiving an order for the construction of military dormitory barracks in Irian Jaya. Tempo suggested his business success was due to his closeness to General Tiopan Bernard (T.B.) Silalahi, former secretary general of the Mining and Energy Ministry and minister of State Apparatus Empowerment in President Suharto's sixth Development Cabinet.

Winata's business empire developed under the Artha Graha Group. He came to national prominence in the late 1980s when he worked with the Indonesian Army's Kartika Eka Paksi Foundation to rescue a troubled local bank, Bank Propelat. In 1986, Finance Minister Radius Prawiro threatened to close Bank Propelat because it was suffering losses. Propelat had started out in 1967 as Propelad, a hospitality company formed by a foundation of the Army's Siliwangi Military Command. As PT Propelat, it became a major contractor for state oil company Pertamina's construction projects in West Java and later became a bank. When the bank faced closure, General Raden Ahmad Kosasih intervened by proposing to Army chief General Edi Sudradjat that Kartika Eka Paksi Foundation get involved in recapitalizing the bank. The bank was taken over by the Army and Winata was invited to take part in its restructuring in 1987, as he already had a long record of doing business with the military and was an associate of Edi Sudradjat and T.B. Silalahi. According to a 2008 biography of Silalahi, Bank Propelat was purchased through Winata and his partner Sugianto Kusuma (better known as Aguan). The Army took a 40% stake, for which it paid nothing, while companies of Winata and Aguan each took a 30% stake. Bank Propelat subsequently changed its name to Bank Artha Graha.

In mid-1997, in cooperation with Bank Indonesia Winata bailed out Bank Arta Prima, which was then merged with Bank Artha Graha. In 2003, Artha Graha Group took over Bank Inter-pacific, Tbk (a publicly listed company). In 2005, Bank Inter-pacific, Tbk acquired Bank Artha Graha becoming Bank Artha Graha Internasional, Tbk (INPC.JK).

Winata is involved in the property sector through PT Jakarta International Hotels and Development, Tbk (JIHD.JK, a publicly listed company), which owns Borobudur Hotel in Central Jakarta, and PT Danayasa Arthatama, Tbk (SCBD.JK, a publicly listed company), which owns the Sudirman Central Business District (SCBD) in the heart of Jakarta. SCBD includes the Indonesian Stock Exchange Building. Winata plans to build the Signature Tower Building-Jakarta, a 111-storey skyscraper, which will be the fifth tallest building in the world, in the center of the SCBD. He has said the mega-project is part of his mission to show the world that "Indonesia can". His vision is to make SCBD the "Manhattan of Indonesia".

He is active in the infrastructure sector, through the company PT Bangungraha Sejahtera Mulia, which obtained support from the governors of Banten and Lampung provinces to be the lead investor for the Sunda Strait Bridge project which, if it proceeds, will be the largest single infrastructure project ever undertaken in Indonesia. Based on Indonesian Presidential Regulation Number 86, dated 2 December 2011, the Lampung-Banten consortium with PT Bangungraha Sejahtera Mulia was appointed to be the Project Initiator to work on a feasibility study for the Sunda Strait Bridge Project and Strategic Area Development. Following the Presidential Regulation, Banten and Lampung provinces together with PT Bangun Sejahtera Mulia established a joint venture company called PT Graha Banten Lampung Sejahtera (GBLS) to conduct the Sunda Strait feasibility study. Based on its pre-feasibility study, Sunda Strait Project construction cost was estimated around US$10 billion and will take around 8 to 10 years to develop.

The Sunda Strait Bridge Project has progressed from an "impossible dream" in 2002 to becoming "almost a possible reality" in 2012, but in 2014 new president Joko Widodo shelved the project.

Winata also has business ventures outside of Indonesia, including in Timor Leste, where he was given approval in secret to build a hotel and shopping complex on government-owned land without having to submit his bid to a tendering process.

Besides his legal operations, Tomy is also a member of the so-called "nine dragons", a group comprising the major individuals behind Jakarta's gambling industry, despite the practice being banned in Indonesia. In April 2000, President Abdurrahman Wahid ordered police to arrest Winata for allegedly running gambling activities on a cruise ship in waters off Jakarta. Police refused to make the arrest, claiming there was a lack of evidence. Attorney General Marzuki Darusman later said the cruise ship owner was a businessman named Sugeng Prananto. In an interview with Tempo magazine in April 2002 on the subject of gambling, Winata said, "Every illegal business that could still survive must have backing. Whether it is government or non-government it all depends on the type of illegal business. Gambling is like a mistress. It is taken care of, financed, protected and consumed, but they never want to expose her." In an interview with Forum magazine in November 2001 he denied any involvement in illegal activities. In an interview with tvOne in September 2020, he said he enjoys the accusations because they raised his profile and dealing with insults helped him to mature as a person.

Aside from his businesses, Winata has established a social non-profit foundation called Artha Graha Peduli Foundation (AG Peduli Foundation), which has five major social activities: provision of emergency relief to victims of natural disasters in Indonesia and abroad; humanitarian programs in food resilience, education and health; programs to save the environment; people empowerment through Small and Medium Enterprises (SMEs); and provision of legal assistance for the underprivileged.

== Political alliances ==
Winata has long cultivated relationships with Indonesia's political elite, since the regime of former president Suharto, whose family was referred to as 'Cendana' after the name of the Central Jakarta street where they lived. Winata himself acknowledged that Indonesia's ethnic Chinese conglomerates benefited from patronage from Suharto's New Order regime, but that doing business became more complex after the regime collapsed in 1998.

During the New Order, everything was easy for Chinese big business: there was one pot of money, contracts and opportunities, and the pot was with the Cendana; now the pot is spread to thousands of people. The political landscape has changed a lot and is more complex than before. Now the social cost of doing business is much higher.

— Tomy Winata, September 2004 interview with Christian Chua

Winata has said he will be loyal to the government, whoever is in power. He was close to former president Megawati Sukarnoputri through a business connection with her husband Taufiq Kiemas. He was also close to Megawati's rival and successor, Susilo Bambang Yudhoyono, through Bank Artha Graha former president commissioner T.B. Silalahi, who became one of President Yudhoyono's key advisors. Economist Faisal Basri believed Winata was a donor to the presidential campaigns of both Megawati and Yudhoyono. Winata himself said:

Up to now businessmen don’t want to be seen as supporting just one party... It will be the end for many businessmen who supported the wrong person. You cannot put all money on one horse, because the uncertainty of winning is too high. Besides this the president now changes at least every 10 years.

Author Christian Chua's 2008 book Chinese Big Business in Indonesia: The State of Capital claims that political patronage secured preferential treatment for Winata's businesses, with economist and future finance minister Chatib Basri alleging it is an "open secret" in Jakarta that cigars and other luxury goods in a shop at Winata's Borobudur Hotel were substantially cheaper because the owner did not have to pay taxes on the goods.

Indonesian media reported that Winata in 2019 supported President Joko Widodo's ultimately successful campaign for re-election, although some political observers had claimed the tycoon's support could harm Widodo's popularity.

Winata also reportedly sought to obtain influence in US politics. In late 1995, Winata told Yah Lin “Charlie” Trie, a fundraiser for President Bill Clinton's 1996 re-election effort, that he wanted a private meeting with Clinton. Trie could not arrange such a meeting but offered Winata a seat next to Clinton at a 19 February 1996 fundraiser at the Hay-Adams Hotel in Washington, DC. Winata did not attend because he wanted a more private meeting and instead sent two of his employees. Trie requested funds for the event, so Winata sent $200,000 in travelers checks via his right-hand man, Santosa Gunara. The Los Angeles Times in February 2000 reported on details of an FBI report in which Trie said he used some of the money to make illegal contributions to the Democratic National Committee and reimburse donors to Clinton's legal defense fund.

== Environmentalism ==
Winata runs a rescue center for the critically endangered Sumatran tiger in Tambling Wildlife Nature Conservation, a park in Lampung Province, Sumatra. Here he tries to reintroduce "conflict tigers"—tigers that have attacked or killed humans—into the wild. TWNC has released five Sumatran tigers back to the TWNC forest, and was also able to release other protected wildlife and animals such as crocodiles and turtles. In addition to 45,000 hectares of forest, TWNC includes 14,500 hectares of sea conservation area.

Cristiano Ronaldo becomes ambassador for Mangrove Care Forum Bali

In March 2013, in Madrid, Spain, Winata together with the Bali Mangrove Care Forum appointed "Cristiano Ronaldo" (CR7), the top Real Madrid soccer player, to be the Ambassador of Mangroves. Winata and Ronaldo agreed to conserve existing mangroves and plant new ones, especially in Bali surrounding areas.

Winata has cooperated with the Indonesian Narcotics Agency (Badan Narkotika Nasional-BNN) to organize a drug rehabilitation program in TWNC. The program combines rehab and environmental conservation, encouraging former drug users to re-establish their lives and livelihoods through work in TWNC conservation and eco-tourism. This program was presented by Winata at the UNODC (United Nations Office on Drugs and Crime) 2013 Annual Meeting in Vienna, Austria. UNODC's Executive Director, Yuri Fedotov, expressed appreciation to Winata for the TWNC program, and said UNODC will encourage other countries to visit Tambling to study its drug rehabilitation program.

== Controversies ==
=== Tempo libel lawsuit ===
Winata was involved in a high-profile libel case against Tempo news magazine after it ran a cover story questioning whether he was involved in the February 2003 burning of the Tanah Abang textile market in Jakarta. In response to the article, a group of thugs was deployed to attack Tempo's office. Winata later commented that "it’s much easier to influence decision-making in a democratic environment, specifically in Indonesia. Famished and poor people will do everything to maintain their survival."

Winata filed libel charges against PT Tempo Inti Media, editor-in-chief Bambang Harymurti, deputy chief editor Toriq Hadad, reporters Ahmad Taufik, Bernarda Rurit and Cahyo Junaidi, publisher Fikri Jufri and corporate director Zulkifli Lubis. On 16 September 2004, Bambang Harymurti was found guilty of "defamation and false reporting" and sentenced to a year in prison, but article author Ahmad Taufik and editor Iskandar Ali were exonerated. Central Jakarta District Court ordered Tempo to publicly apologize and to pay a fine of 500 million rupiah (US$59,000). The presiding judge stated that Tempo failed to find the truth by covering both sides before publishing the article". However, the ruling was later overturned on appeal.

BBC News described the case as being "widely criticised as an attack on Indonesia's press", and Amnesty International declared Harymutri to be a prisoner of conscience. On 9 February 2005, Harymutri's sentence was overturned by the Supreme Court of Indonesia, a spokesperson for which stated, "We want to ensure that journalists are protected."

=== Relationship with SBY ===
A leaked diplomatic cable described Winata as having "a specially close relationship" with President Susilo Bambang Yudhoyono and alleged that he was the head of a crime syndicate called "The Gang of Nine" or "The Nine Dragons". The cable also alleged that Winata had funneled money to Yudhoyono for "questionable political purposes". Winata denied the allegations, dismissing them as the gossip of rival politicians and stating, "I would prefer to lick your shoes [...] than for you to believe the WikiLeaks rumors." He stated that his relationship with the President was that of "any other citizen".

=== Travelers checks in Bank Indonesia case ===
The Indonesian media alleged that Winata's conglomerate, Artha Graha Group, was involved in the provision of travelers checks used in 2004 to bribe Indonesian politicians to elect Miranda Swaray Goeltom as Senior Deputy Governor of the Indonesian central bank, Bank Indonesia. Miranda denied knowing the owner of Bank Artha Graha.
