= Mardigu Wowiek Prasantyo =

Indonesian businessperson and social media personality

- Born: Madiun, East Java, Indonesia
- Other names: Bossman Mardigu, Bossman Sontoloyo
- Education: San Francisco State University
- Occupation: Businessman
- Known for: YouTube Bossman Mardigu

YouTube information
- Channel: Bossman Mardigu
- Years active: 2019–sekarang
- Genres: Geopolitik; Geoeconomics
- Subscribers: 2.05 million
- Views: 450 million
- Last updated: 4 August 2026

Mardigu Wowiek Prasantyo or better known as Bossman Mardigu (born 1960s) is a businessman from Indonesia who is active on Instagram and YouTube social media. One of the thoughts of Mardigu Wowiek Prasantyo that is most quoted is suggesting Bank Indonesia to issue a Digital Rupiah or e-Rupiah which is considered to be a solution for the Indonesian economy. Mardigu Wowiek gave birth to "cyronium" which could be the first cryptocurrency in Indonesia. Even though he received a stern warning from Bank Indonesia and the Financial Services Authority. This is because until now no entrepreneur or company has dared to openly issue digital money. Until now, Bank Indonesia and OJK have been reluctant to grant permits for all cryptocurrencies in Indonesia for various reasons.

Apart from the cyronium issue, he also has an idea in terms of finance, namely by applying the MMT (Modern Monetary Theory) concept which according to him can reduce the country's dependence on the US dollar, namely by creating a new currency "Dinar" with gold underlaying, so that its value is more stable.

Apart from being a businessman, Mardigu Wowiek is also a terrorism observer. He claims to have interviewed around 400 terrorist members. With his background, he became a hypnotherapist, namely a mental, emotional, behavioral and thought therapist who is carried out in a hypnotic state. In the Indonesian government, he also "claimed" to be an assistant to the ministry's expert staff from 2014 to 2019. Not only that, he is also active as a business motivator through the Millionaire Mindset Washing Boot Camp program. In the midst of his busy life he also became a writer and published several books. Mardigu Wowiek also introduced himself as a philanthropist with the Indonesian Orphan House program which has 1000 students.
