= Sugianto Kusuma =

Indonesian businessman

Sugianto Kusuma (a.k.a. Aguan, Chinese: 郭再源; born 10 January 1951 in Palembang), is an Indonesian business tycoon. He owns Agung Sedayu Group, one of Indonesia's largest property developers.

== Career ==
Kusuma started off by selling electronic goods via Palembang. He became a business partner with Tomy Winata. Kusuma is a member of the so-called "nine dragons", a group comprising individuals behind Jakarta's gambling industry during the New Order.

Kusuma became wealthy in the 1980s by working with military financier Robby Sumampouw to conduct an unlicensed lottery (toto gelap) and casino in Surabaya.

=== Business ===
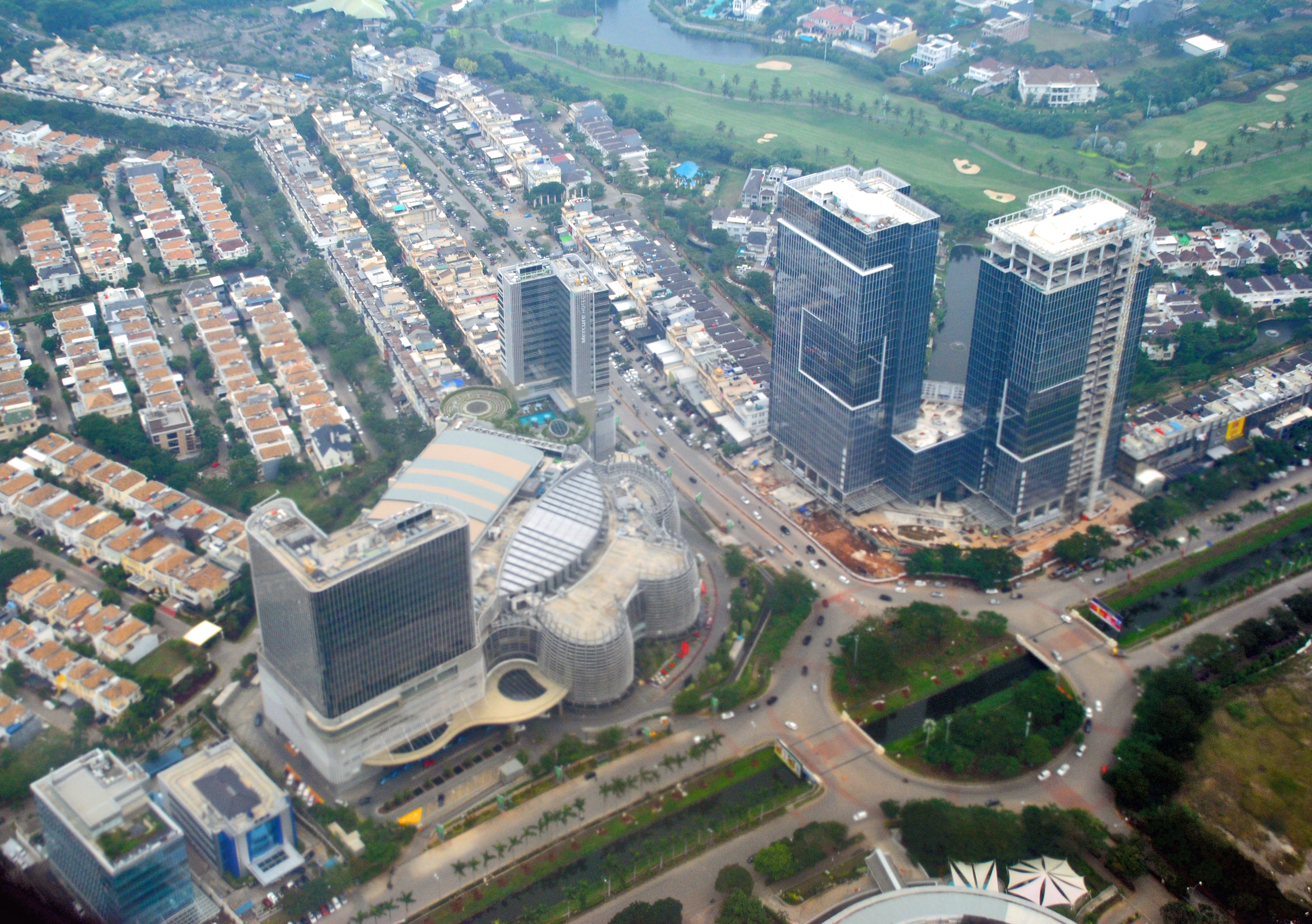
Aerial view of Pantai Indah Kapuk, Jakarta

Kusuma and Winata own PT Danayasa Arthatama, through Jakarta International Hotels & Developments Tbk, which developed and owns the Sudirman Central Business District.

Kusuma and his family own PT Agung Sedayu. Through PT Multi Artha Pratama, PT Agung Sedayu also owns 89% Pantai Indah Kapuk Dua (previously named Pratama Abadi Nusa Industri), which went public in 2018. Pantai Indah Kapuk Dua, or PIK2 is a new development area in Tangerang Regency.

== Land reclamation controversy ==
In mid-2015, North Jakarta officials refused permission for developers to proceed with the construction of offshore islands. However, despite this denial, some developers continued their work. Concurrently, Governor Basuki Tjahaja Purnama proposed a draft Regional Regulation (Perda) on land reclamation to the DPRD. This legislation aimed to clarify spatial planning rules, facilitating developers in obtaining necessary permits. However, it also proposed an increase in the percentage of tax from land sales. This adjustment, from the previously set level of five percent by President Soeharto to 15 percent. Kusuma estimated an additional cost of Rp12 trillion due to this change.

In December 2015, according to investigations by the Corruption Eradication Commission, DPRD members convened at Kusuma's residence. Allegedly, during this meeting, Kusuma influenced senior provincial legislators to pass the spatial planning legislation without the provision for increased land contribution. Some witnesses, as reported by the press, claimed that developers offered sums ranging from Rp2.5-5 billion to each DPRD member who cast the appropriate vote. Kusuma and his son, Richard Halim, have undergone questioning by the KPK multiple times, and were put on an international travel ban in April-October 2016.

According to Tempo, Agung Sedayu made four payments to Prasetyo Edi Marsudi, the speaker from PDI-Perjuangan and a former employee of Kusuma, who then distributed the funds to others, including Ongen Sangaji. A wire-tapped conversation presented in court by KPK prosecutors revealed an Agung Sedayu executive informing Sanusi that Kusuma would exert pressure on Marsudi to ensure the passage of the perda on spatial planning. Sanusi, in turn, expressed dissatisfaction with Marsudi's distribution of bribe money, claiming it hindered cooperation among DPRD members.

In December 2016, Gerindra legislator and speaker of the local parliament, Mohamad Sanusi, received a sentence of 7 years and a fine 250 million Rupiah. The head of Agung Podomoro Land, Ariesman Widjaja, received a three-year prison sentence for having paid a Rp. 2 billion bribe to Sanusi. His assistant, Trinanda Prihantoro, received a sentence of 20 months while confirming Sanusi's purchase of multiple assets from Agung Podomoro Land, including apartments and buildings. Additionally, investigators seized evidence from Sanusi, including luxury vehicles and cash, suspecting that he received inducements from developers and distributed payments to other DPRD members.

== Personal life ==
Sugianto Kusuma is married to Rebecca Halim. They have 4 children. Kusuma and his wife joined Tzu Chi in 2002, after a trip to Hualien, Taiwan in 2001.

Sugianto Kusuma's brother Susanto Kusuma, is also a shareholder of Agung Sedayu. His nephew Steven Kusumo, is the CEO of Agung Sedayu.
