= Ciliandra Fangiono =

Indonesian businessman

- Born: 1976
- Alma mater: University of Cambridge
- Parent(s): Martias Fangiono
- Relatives: Wirashery Fangiono, Wirasneny Fangiono, Ciliandrew Fangiono, Wirastuty Fangiono
- Awards: Tatler 500 Indonesia; Asia's Most Influential Indonesia (2021)

Ciliandra Fangiono is an Indonesian businessman and palm oil investor. He is the chief executive officer of First Resources, a palm oil company registered in Singapore with plantation assets located entirely in Indonesia. His family owns a majority stake in the company, which was founded by his father in 1992. According to Forbes, he has an estimated networth of $2.35B.

== Career ==
He has a Bachelor's and Master of Arts in Economics degree from Cambridge University, UK. During his studies at Cambridge, he was a Senior Scholar in Economics and won the PriceWaterhouse Book Prize.

Ciliandra first started working at Merrill Lynch in Singapore.

== Personal life ==
His brother Cik Sigih Fangiono is the deputy chief executive of First Resources. Fangiono is married to Serene Lim Mei Jin and has four children.
