= Soegiarto Adikoesoemo =

Indonesian businessman

- Born: 1937 or 1938 (age 88–89)
- Occupation: Businessman
- Known for: Founder of AKR Corporindo
- Spouse: Married
- Children: 2, including Haryanto Adikoesoemo
- Website: www.akr.co.id

Soegiarto Adikoesoemo (Chinese: 翁鈺鶯; born 1937 or 1938) is an Indonesian billionaire businessman and the founder of AKR Corporindo.

== Career ==
Soegiarto started a small chemical trading business in Surabaya and incorporated PT Aneka Kimia Raya in 1978, which traded and distributed basic chemicals in Indonesia.

Soegiarto built Sorini a manufacturing plant for sorbitol in Indonesia and Khalista in China, and grew both plants to become one of the biggest producers in Asia.

He is president commissioner of PT AKR Corporindo TBK.

== Personal life ==
He is married, with two children, and lives in Surabaya, Jakarta, Indonesia.

His son Haryanto Adikoesoemo opened the Museum of Modern and Contemporary Art (Museum MACAN) in Kebun Jeruk, a suburb of Jakarta, with 800 contemporary and modern art works from his collection.
