= Lim Gunawan Hariyanto =

Indonesian businessman Conglo

- Born: 1960 (age 65–66); Kalimantan, Indonesia
- Citizenship: Indonesian
- Occupations: President Director and CEO, Harita Group

Lim Gunawan Hariyanto (born in 1960) is an Indonesian businessman whose business is in the natural resources sector. He is currently CEO of Harita Group, a family conglomerate, which has companies in plantations, mining, smelters, and refineries.

He is also the CEO of Singapore-listed palm oil company Bumitama Agri.

== Profile ==
Gunawan was born in Samarinda, East Kalimantan, Indonesia. He graduated as a Bachelor of Business Administration from the University of Southern California in 1981 and started his career in 1982 by helping his father in the family business. He later expanded the business into mining and palm oil plantations through organic growth and strategic joint venture partnerships. Gunawan is known for his vibrant personality and win-win philosophy of doing business. He is an avid golfer and singer, and has produced 4 of his own music CD albums to date.
