= Batu Hijau mine =

Mine in Indonesia

Batu Hijau mine Amman Mineral
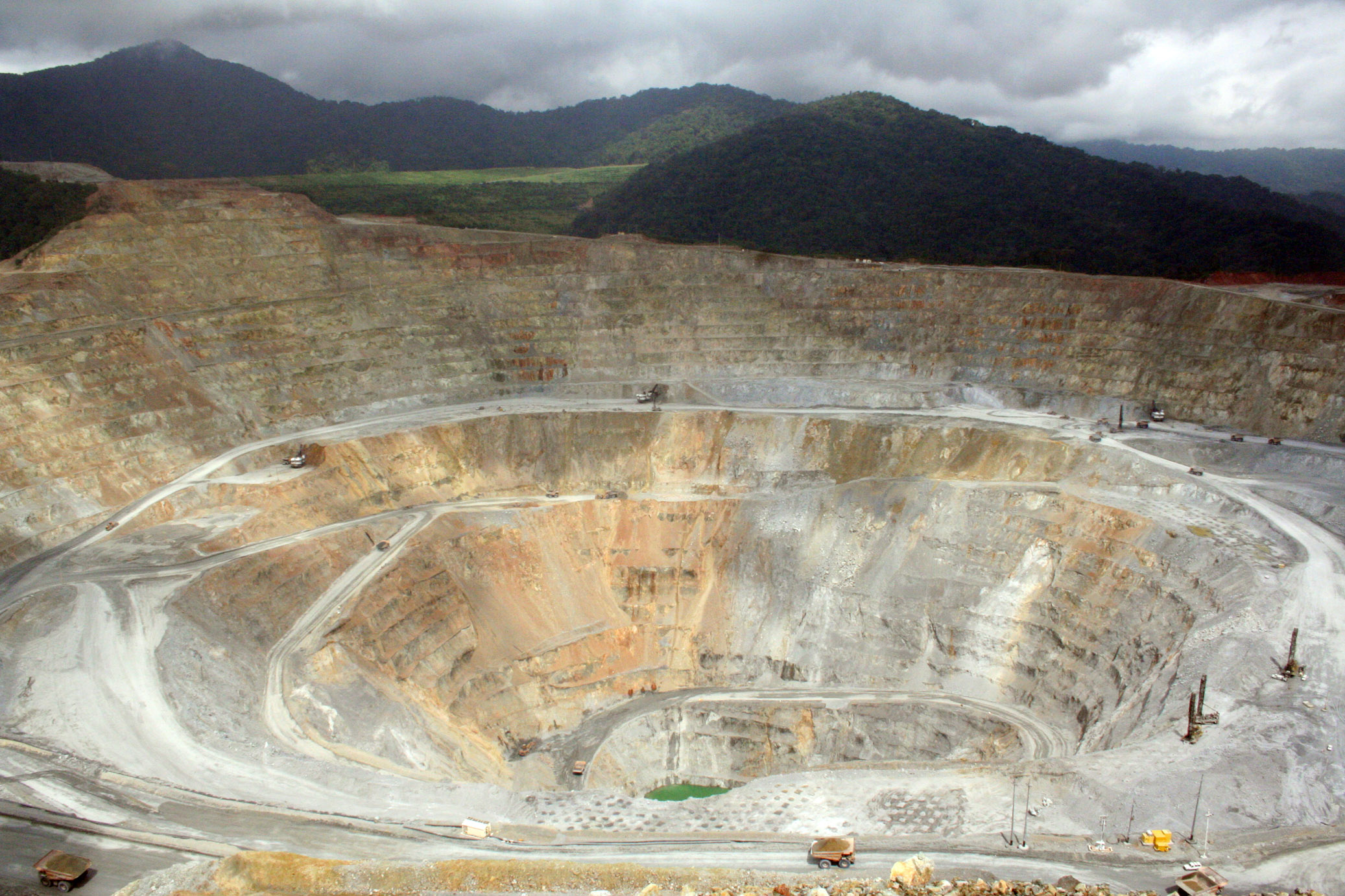
- Batu Hijau pit in 2006

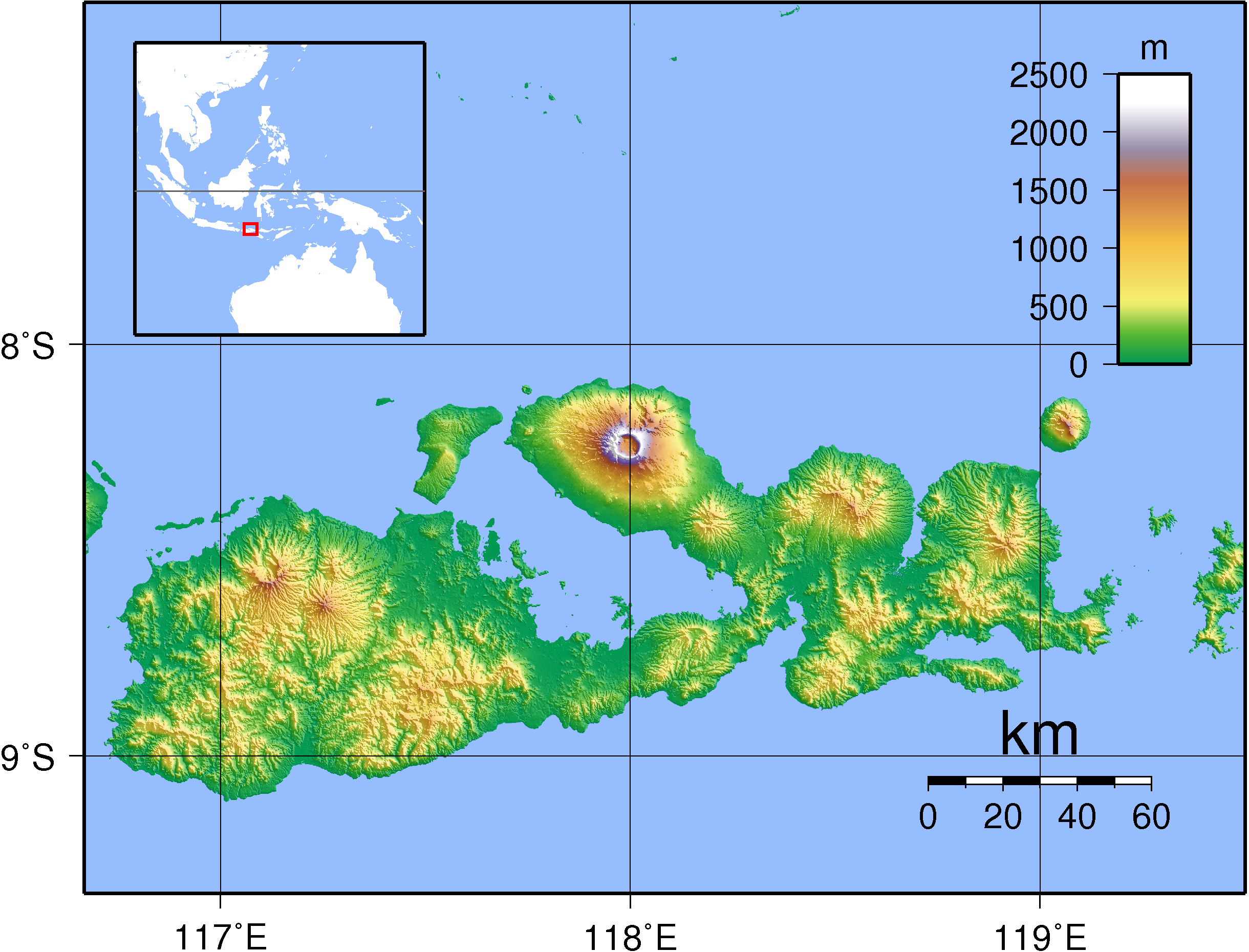
- Location in Sumbawa Location in Lesser Sunda Islands Location in Indonesia
- Location: West Sumbawa Regency, West Nusa Tenggara, Indonesia; 08°58′S 116°52′E
- Products: Copper; Gold; Silver
- Production: 463,900,000 pounds copper 730,700 ounces gold 2,170,400 ounces silver
- Financial year: 2022
- Opened: 2000
- Closed: 2032
- Company: PT. Amman Mineral Nusa Tenggara
- Website: PT. Amman Mineral Nusa Tenggara

The Batu Hijau mine is an open pit copper-gold mine operated by PT. Amman Mineral Nusa Tenggara (previously known as PT Newmont Nusa Tenggara). The mine is the second largest copper-gold mine in Indonesia behind the Grasberg mine of PT. Freeport Indonesia. The mine is located 1,530 kilometres (950 mi) east of the Indonesian capital Jakarta on Sumbawa, an island in West Nusa Tenggara Province, more precisely in the southern part of West Sumbawa Regency. The mine is the result of a ten-year exploration and construction program based on a 1999 discovery of the porphyry copper deposit. Production began in 2000.

The mine utilizes a "truck and shovel" open-pit mining method, with ore reporting to semi-Autogenous Grinding and ball mills, followed by a flotation circuit. The finished product is a thickened copper-gold concentrate, which is pumped to a filtration and storage facility at the Benete port.

== History ==
During 1984, Newmont undertook conceptual studies and identified the island arc terrain to the east of Bali as being prospective for epithermal gold mineralization. A joint venture was formed with PT. Pukuafu Indah in September 1985, and tenement applications lodged over the islands of Lombok and West Sumbawa Regency. In 1986, a Contract of Work with the Government of Indonesia was signed.

During 1987, a regional geochemical sampling program commenced. Due to the mountainous and jungle-covered terrain, samples primarily comprised silt stream-sediment samples. A total of 36 gold anomalies were generated, and prioritized for additional exploration. In 1989, a significant copper and gold anomaly was identified in the Sejorong drainage located near the southwest coast of Sumbawa. Field checking of the anomaly identified altered and Copper-stained diorite float samples in the river bed, and subsequently, strong quartz pyrite stockworking and abundant Copper staining in outcrops within Green Creek.

In 1990 mineral exploration on the island of Sumbawa resulted in the discovery of copper mineralization that would be developed into the Batu Hijau mine. The deposit was named for the discovery outcrop, a bright-green oxide-copper occurrence; in Indonesian, "Batu Hijau" means "green rock." Over the next ten years PT Newmont Nusa Tenggara delineate the resource and began developing the mine and building the required infrastructure. In 1991, core drilling commenced, and continued to 1996. A feasibility study was completed in February 1996. The feasibility study was amended in July 1996 to reflect an updated mine plan based on additional drilling data, a change from fresh water to sea water processing, and a change from distributed diesel power generation to a central, coal-fired power plant. A partnership agreement was entered into with Sumitomo in July 1996, under which Sumitomo became equity partners and co-managers of the Batu Hijau Project.

The Indonesian government approved the feasibility study in 1997, allowing construction to commence in the same year. Additional drilling programs continued to define the deposit from 1996 to 1998. Total capital costs for the initial Batu Hijau Project were $1.8 billion. The Batu Hijau mine was the largest "green-fields" mining project ever built. In 1999 construction was completed and by the next year Batu Hijau was producing ore.

In 2016, Newmont Mining Corporation successfully completed the sale of its ownership stake in PT Newmont Nusa Tenggara, which operates the Batu Hijau copper and gold mine in Indonesia, to PT Amman Mineral Internasional.

== Geology and ore reserves ==
The orebody at Batu Hijau is a porphyry copper type and includes a high gold component, which is common for such copper deposits in southeast Asia. The host rock for porphyry copper deposits in southeast Asia is typically diorite and quartz diorite. Copper sulphides such as chalcopyrite and bornite are frequently associated with the gold component of these deposits.

As of the end of 2022, Batu Hijau had an ore reserve of 803Mt of ore at 0.37% Cu and 0.31g/t Au containing 6,609 Mlbs copper and 8.1 Moz gold.

== Mining & milling ==
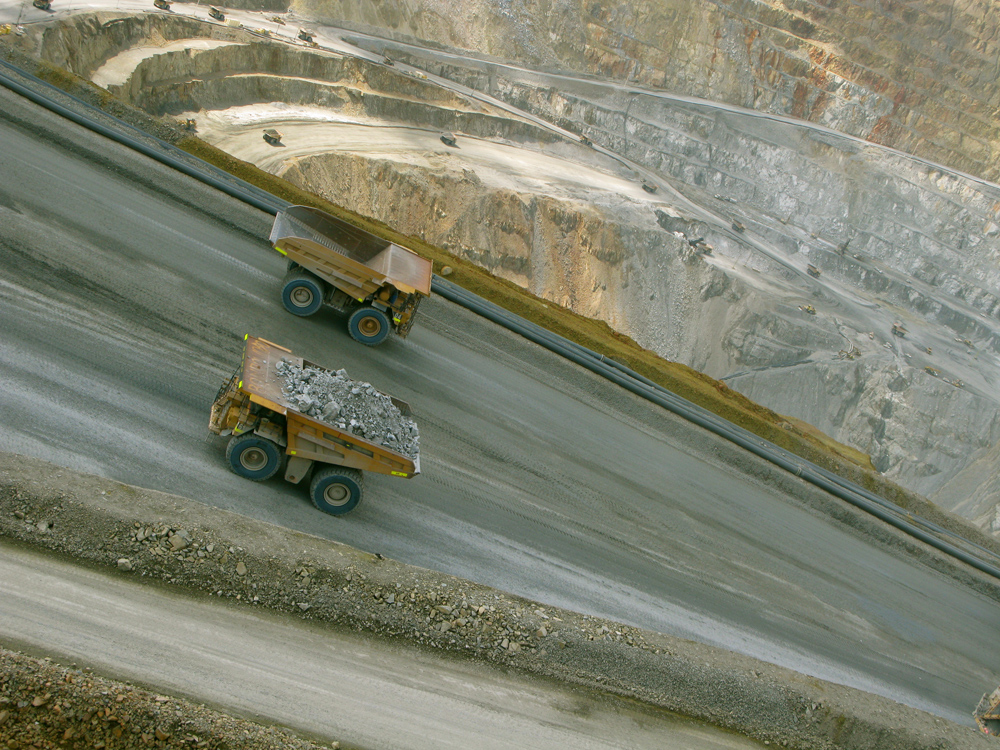
Haul trucks at the Batu Hijau mine

Batu Hijau is an open-pit mine. Ore is removed from the mining face using P&H 4100 electric shovels and loaded into Caterpillar 793C haul trucks (pictured). Each haul truck can move a payload 220 t (240 short tons) of ore. The trucks haul ore from the shovel to primary crushers. Crushed ore is sent by a conveyor 1.8 m (6 ft) wide and 6.8 km (4.2 mi) long to the mill. Daily production from the mine is an average of 600,000 t (660,000 short tons) ore and waste combined. Ore from the mine has an average copper grade of 0.49% and an average gold grade of 0.39g/t.

Crushed ore is further reduced in size by Semi-Autogenous Grinding and ball mills. Once milled it is sent through a flotation circuit which produces a concentrate with a grade of 32% copper and 19.9g/t gold. The mill realizes a copper recovery of 89%. The slurry concentrate is thickened and piped 17.6 km (10.9 mi) to the port at Benete where water is recovered from the slurry. The concentrate storage at the port can hold 80,000 t (88,000 short tons) of copper-gold concentrate.

== Environmental issues ==
Waste rock from the Batu Hijau mine is disposed of in the rainforest, with space for newly produced waste rock running out. Environmentalists are raising concern with the declining population of the yellow-crested cockatoo.

Disposal of tailings from the processing operation of the Batu Hijau mine takes place in the ocean, using a process called Submarine Tailings Disposal (STD). Indonesia is currently the only location that uses this process, PT. Amman Mineral Nusa Tenggara claiming that this practice is more environmentally sound despite being more costly to the company. The process involves piping the tailings 2.1 miles (3.4 km) off the coast to a drop-off of 400 feet (120 m), which carries the waste down another 10,000 feet (3,000 m).

The reasoning behind the environmental claim is that in deeper waters, oxygen levels are low enough to substantially reduce the oxidation reactions that release heavy metals from the mine waste into the environment. This claim for environmental conservation is most controversial: it does not take into account the fact that very little is known about the ecology of the ocean floors; nor does it account for underwater currents, or that geologic activity can disperse the waste into shallower waters (especially keeping in mind that the region is highly volatile in terms of volcanic activity); and it is very much challenged by that this mine's discharge has had at least three pipe breaks since its opening in 1999.
