= Museum of Modern and Contemporary Art in Nusantara =

Museum MACAN (Modern and Contemporary Art in Nusantara)

- Location within Jakarta
- Established: 7 November 2017
- Location: AKR Tower Level MM, Kb. Jeruk, Kota Jakarta Barat, Jakarta
- Coordinates: 6.1909071°S 106.767875°E
- Type: Art museum
- Founder: Haryanto Adikoesoemo
- Director: Venus Lau
- Public transit access: Kebon Jeruk
- Website: https://www.museummacan.org/

The Museum of Modern and Contemporary Art in Nusantara (or Museum MACAN) is an art museum at Kebon Jeruk in Jakarta, Indonesia.

Opened in November 2017, the museum is the first in Indonesia to have a collection of modern and contemporary Indonesian and international art. It has a floor area of 7,107 m^{2} (76,500 sq ft) with display area of about 4,000 m^{2} (43,000 sq ft). The museum is included in a list of the World’s 100 Greatest Places 2018 released by Time magazine.

== Artworks ==
The museum displays around 90 works from a collection totalling 800 modern Indonesian and contemporary artworks from around the world including 'Infinity Mirrored Room' by Japanese artist Yayoi Kusama.

=== Paintings ===
The museum houses collections of paintings such as:

- Great Criticism: Coca-Cola, Wang Guangyi
- Baguio Market, Fernando C. Amorsolo
- Peta Bali dengan Mata Angin, Miguel Covarrubias
- Wipe Out #1, FX Harsono
- China China, Zhu Wei
- Lanskap Hindia, Raden Saleh
- Kantor Pos Jawa, Raden Saleh
- Swallow's Nest, Yayoi Kusama
- Thought and Method, Xu Bing

=== Performance and installation arts ===
Contemporary and modern art displayed by the MACAN museum is not limited to paintings, but also includes contemporary styles using various media, techniques, and installation art.

Various performances and installation art in the museum:

- Art Turns, World Turns, Exploring the Collection of the Museum Macan
- Seven Stories, Lee Mingwei
- One Million Years, On Kawara
- The Past Has Not Passed, Arahmaiani
- Life Heart Rainbow, Yayoi Kusama
- Dunia Dalam Berita
