= Haryanto Adikoesoemo =

Indonesian businessman and art collector

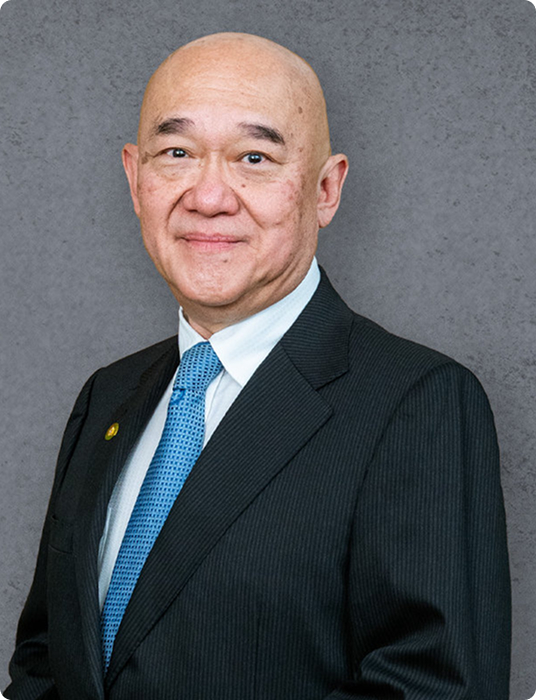
- Born: 1962 or 1963 (age 63–64)
- Education: University of Bradford
- Occupations: Businessman and art collector
- Known for: Founder of Museum of Modern and Contemporary Art
- Title: President and director, AKR Corporindo
- Spouse: Married
- Children: 5
- Parent: Soegiarto Adikoesoemo

Haryanto Adikoesoemo (born 1962) is an Indonesian businessman and art collector.

== Early life ==
He is the son of Indonesian billionaire Soegiarto Adikoesoemo, the founder of AKR Corporindo. He earned a degree from the University of Bradford in 1983.

== Career ==
Adikoesoemo succeeded his father as president of AKR Corporindo in 1992.

He was awarded the 2008 Indonesian Entrepreneur of the Year by Ernst & Young, Businessman of the Year 2012 by Forbes Indonesia magazine, and Best CEO 2012 by Corporate Governance Magazine Hong Kong.

== Art collector ==
In November 2017, he opened the Museum of Modern and Contemporary Art (Museum MACAN) in Kebun Jeruk, a suburb of Jakarta, Indonesia, with 800 contemporary and modern art works from his collection. His collection contains works by artists such as Jeff Koons, Andy Warhol, Mark Rothko, and Gerhard Richter. He also collects regional artists such as the Indonesian artists Affandi, Srihadi Soedarsono, FX Harsono, and Entang Wiharso.

== Personal life ==
Adikoesoemo is married and has five children.
