= Edwin Soeryadjaya =

Indonesian businessman

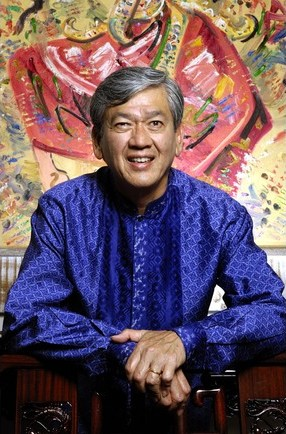
- Edwin Soeryadajaya
- Born: 17 July 1949 (age 76); Jakarta, Indonesia
- Education: University of Southern California (BA, BS)
- Occupations: Businessperson; investor
- Known for: Saratoga Investama Sedaya, Adaro Energy
- Children: 3
- Father: William Soeryadjaya

Edwin Soeryadjaya (born 17 July 1949) is an Indonesian businessman, He is the son of the late William Soeryadjaya, who founded automotive group Astra International.

== Education ==
Seoryadja graduated from the University of Southern California, United States.

== Career ==
Soeryadjaya set up investment firm Saratoga Investama Sedaya in 1998. Today, through his private equity firm, PT Saratoga Investama Sedaya, he holds an ownership in coal miner Adaro Energy. He also has a stake in cell tower company Tower Bersama Infrastructure and bought Mandala Airlines in 2011 with his partner Sandiaga Uno.

== Wealth ==
Currently Edwin was known as the 12th richest person in Indonesia and the #913 in the world according to Forbes.
