= Harita Group =

Indonesian business conglomerate

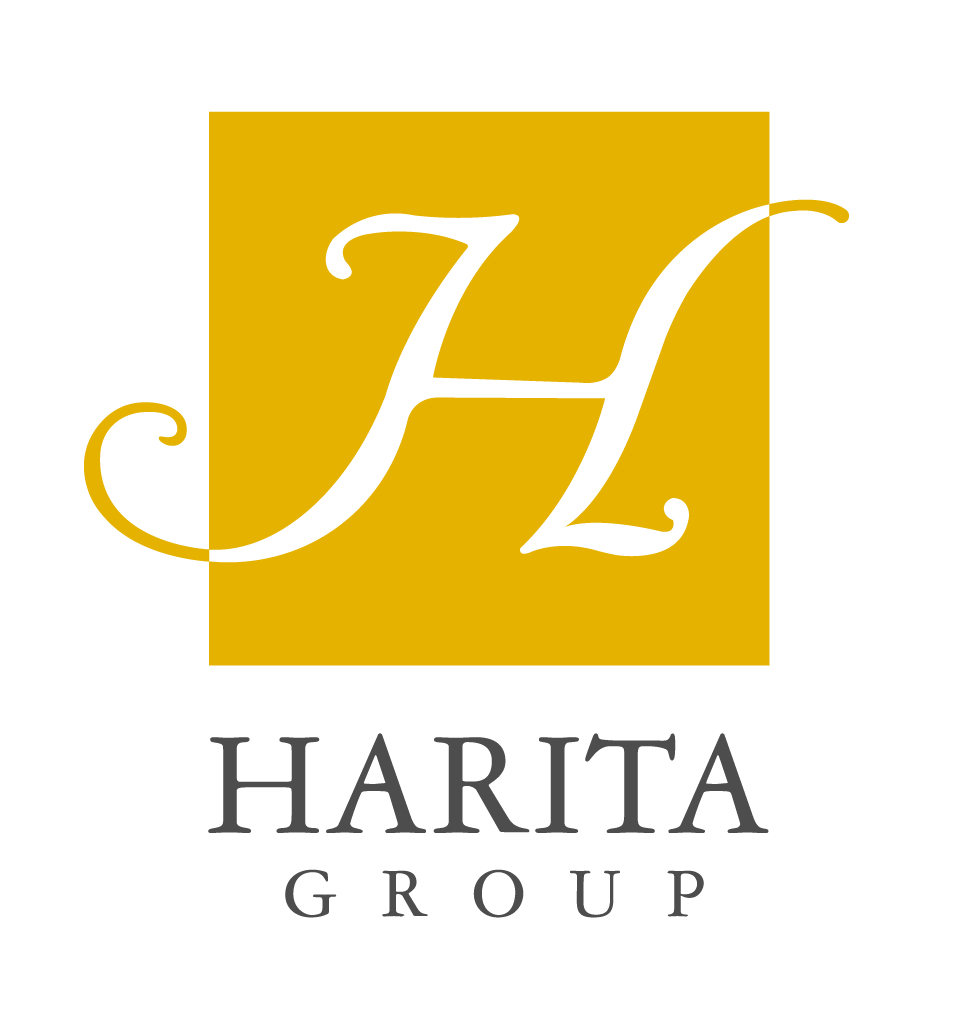
- Type: Private Company
- Industry: Natural Resources
- Founded: 1915; 111 years ago
- Headquarters: Jakarta, Indonesia
- Key people: Lim Gunawan Hariyanto (CEO); Gunardi Hariyanto Lim (Deputy CEO)
- Number of employees: 40,000

The Harita Group is an Indonesian business conglomerate owned and controlled by the Lim family. The group's core businesses are in the natural resources sector, which operates throughout Indonesia. Today, the Harita Group has businesses in nickel mining, ferronickel smelters, bauxite mining, alumina refineries, palm oil plantations, shipping, timber, coal and property. The current CEO of Harita Group is Lim Gunawan Hariyanto.

== History ==
The group was started in 1915 by Lim Tju King, an immigrant from China. He started with a small trading shop in Long Iram inland of the Mahakam River in East Kalimantan, Indonesia. His son Lim Hariyanto Wijaya Sarwono took over and moved into the timber business, first by trading timber and later going into timber concessions and in manufacturing of plywood in 1983.

Starting in the late 1980s, Lim Hariyanto started rapidly expanding the business through joint venture partnerships. They expanded their timber and plywood division, entered into gold mining in 1988 through a joint venture project with Rio Tinto Group named Kelian Equatorial Mining (KEM) and later into coal mining in 1988. From there, the group continued to diversify into palm oil plantations (1998), bauxite mining (2003), and nickel mining (2004).

After the Indonesian government banned the export of raw minerals in 2014, Harita Group and its partners built a $400 million ferronickel smelter and Indonesia's first alumina refinery for $900 million. In December 2019, Glencore became a partner of the group's aluminium business after buying an 18% stake in Indonesian-listed PT Cita Mineral Investindo Tbk via a rights issue for $93 million. In June 2021, Harita commissioned the first HPAL (High Pressure Acid Leaching) plant in Indonesia, which produces Mixed Hydroxide Precipitate, a raw material for electric vehicle batteries. The project had an estimated cost of $1 billion.

== Businesses ==
Core businesses
Sector	Company Function	Company name	Remarks
Aluminium	Holding company	PT Cita Mineral Investindo Tbk	Listed in Indonesia in 2002; As of 2025, the Group holds 61% and Glencore holds 32%
Aluminium	Smelter company	PT Well Harvest Winning	Originally built to a capacity of 1 million tons per year (mtpa), capacity was expanded to 2 mtpa and operational by 2022; The Group owns 30% via PT Cita Mineral Investindo Tbk, 56% is held by China Hongqiao Group
Aluminium	Mining company	PT Karya Utama Tambang Jaya	
Nickel	Holding company	PT Trimegah Bangun Persada Tbk (TBP)	Listed in Indonesia in 2023; The 2023 IPO raised 10 trillion Rupiah ($670 million) for 12.7%; As of 2025, the Group holds 84.7% of the company
Nickel	HPAL smelter	PT Halmahera Persada Lygend (HPL)	A joint venture between TBP (45%), China's Lygend Resources (36%) and Kang Xuan Pte Ltd (18%); In 2023, HPL was the first company in Indonesia to successfully produce battery-grade nickel sulfate; In 2024, HPL achieved its full year production of 65,000 tons of metallic metal
Nickel	Mining companies	1. PT Gema Kreasi Perdana; 2. PT Gane Permai Sentosa	
Nickel	Ferronickel smelter	PT Halmahera Jaya Feronikel	Has a production capacity of 829,000 tons/year of ferronickel
Palm Oil	Holding company	Bumitama Agri Ltd	Listed in Singapore in 2012; Bumitama owns 14 CPO mills in Kalimantan and Riau, with a combined FFB processing capacity of 5,850,000 tons per year; As of 2025, the Group holds 52% via Wellpoint Pacific Holdings Ltd and Malaysian IOI Corporation Berhad holds 32%
Timber	Holding company	PT Tirta Mahakam Resources	Listed in Indonesia in 1999, delisted in 2025

Other businesses: Harita Group also has a coal division, which was set up in 1996 with Thai coal producer Lanna Resources Pcl to develop coal deposits in Indonesia. In 2018, the group also partnered with Singapore listed company Perennial Real Estate Holdings Ltd to develop a property project in Sentul City, Indonesia.
