= Bachtiar Karim =

Indonesian businessman

- Born: November 5, 1957 (age 68); Medan, Indonesia
- Citizenship: Indonesian
- Education: NUS Business
- Occupations: Owner, Musim Mas
- Parent(s): Anwar Karim & Mikie Wijaya
- Relatives: Burhan Karim (brother); Bahari Karim (brother)

Bachtiar Karim (born November 5, 1957) is an Indonesian businessman and palm oil tycoon He is the chairman of Musim Mas, one of the world's leading palm oil conglomerates headquartered in Singapore. Karim was listed as Indonesia's #10 richest man, with a net-worth of $3.5B in 2021. He was also listed in Tatler as one of Asia's Most Influential in 2021.

== Education ==
He studied in Singapore at the Hwa Chong Junior College and completed a degree in Mechanical Engineering at the National University of Singapore.

== Notable transactions ==
In 2019, Karim bought over the entire Darby Park Executive Suites (a 6-story serviced residence building in Singapore) in prime area Orange Grove near Orchard Road for $160 million from Royal Group Holdings Pte Ltd, one of the largest private property transactions in Singapore that year. His family's real estate investment company, Invictus Developments, is redeveloping the plot of land under the Standard Hotels chain into a luxury boutique 143-room hotel, slated to be open in 2023.

In 2022, Karim's family bought the House of Tan Yeok Nee (a mansion building designated as a national monument of Singapore) in the Museum Planning Area through a competitive Expression of Interest exercise (EOI). It is one of just five privately owned commercial national monuments. Chayadi Karim, the spokesperson of the Karim family, said they are "exploring various investment strategies for ... this conservation marvel." Currently, it remains the campus of Amity Global Institute.

== Family ==
His father Anwar Karim founded the Nam Cheong Soap Factory in Medan in 1932. He has three brothers: Burhan Karim, Bahari Karim, Bachrum Karim. His family founded an entrepreneur center, which operates in the University of North Sumatra.

== Philanthropy ==
Karim is actively involved in philanthropy, having his own entrepreneur and training center in Medan, and having donated back to his alma mater, the NUS Business School.
