= Otto Toto Sugiri =

Indonesian businessman

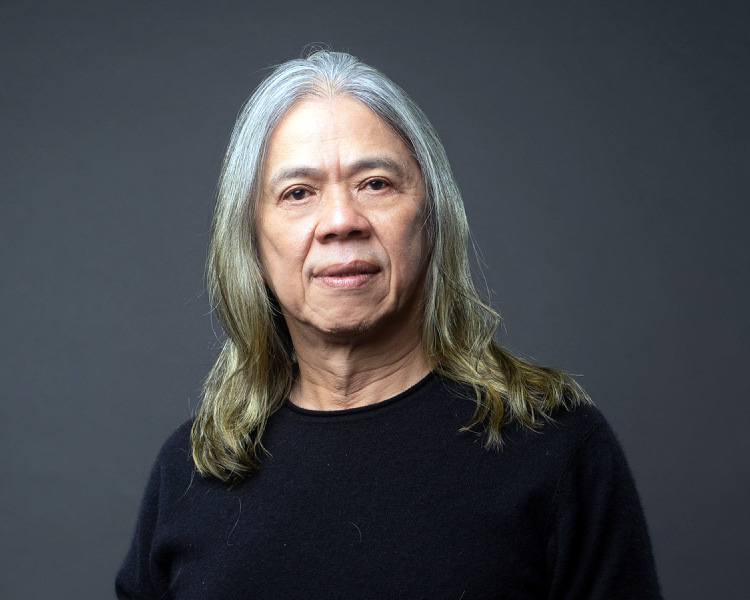
- Otto Toto Sugiri
- Born: September 23, 1953 (age 72); Bandung, Indonesia
- Occupation: CEO of Data Center Indonesia

Otto Toto Sugiri (born 23 September 1953) is an Indonesian billionaire businessman. He is the CEO of Data Center Indonesia (DCI), a company that provides data center services and solutions in Indonesia. He is ranked as the 19th-richest person in Indonesia by Forbes magazine, with a net worth of US$12.5 billion, as of August 2025.

== Early life and education ==
Sugiri was born on 23 September 1953. He graduated from RWTH Aachen University in 1980.

== Career ==
=== Early career ===
Otto Toto Sugiri's career began in 1983 as General Manager of IT at Bank Bali. This experience provided a strong foundation for developing expertise in information technology.

In 1989, he founded PT Sigma Cipta Caraka (Sigma), a company that pioneered technology development in Indonesia. Under his leadership, Sigma grew rapidly and became a pioneer in IT services.

Furthermore, in 1999, he founded PT Sigma Karya Sempurna (Balicamp), a globally oriented software development company located in Pacung village, Bali. Balicamp became a platform for young Indonesian talent to compete on the international stage.

In 2009, he founded Data Center Indonesia, a company that offers data center infrastructure, cloud computing, network connectivity, and managed services. Data Center Indonesia operates four data centers in Jakarta and Surabaya, with a total capacity of more than 10 megawatts. In 2020, Data Center Indonesia became the first company in Southeast Asia to receive the Tier IV Certification of Constructed Facility from the Uptime Institute.

=== Business development ===
His success led Otto Toto Sugiri to various strategic positions:

2016–present: President Director of PT DCI Indonesia Tbk, leading the company to become a leader in the data center industry in Southeast Asia.

2012–2016: President Commissioner of PT DCI Indonesia.

2016–present: Founder and President Commissioner of PT Fortress Data Services.

2018–present: Commissioner of PT Tiga Daya Digital Indonesia.

2018–present: Commissioner of PT Redkendi Andalan Mitra.

2019–present: Commissioner of PT Smartfarm Agro Indonesia.

2012–present: Commissioner of PT Sarana Pactindo.

1994–2024: Vice President Commissioner of PT Indointernet Tbk.

== Awards ==
His success in the technology industry has earned him national recognition. On September 11, 2023, Otto Toto Sugiri was awarded the Satyalancana Pembangunan (Development Award) in Information and Digital Technology, a prestigious award from the Indonesian government for his contributions to the development of digital infrastructure.

In August 2024, Otto Toto Sugiri was awarded the Bintang Jasa Utama (Star of Main Services) by the 7th President of the Republic of Indonesia, Joko Widodo. This award was given in recognition of Otto Toto Sugiri's dedication to the advancement of the technology industry in Indonesia, particularly in the field of data centers.
