= Musim Mas =

Indonesian food processing company

Musim Mas Group
- Company type: Private
- Industry: food processing, agribusiness, palm oil, biofuel
- Founded: 1932
- Founder: Anwar Karim
- Area served: Indonesia, Brazil, Germany, Malaysia, India, China, Vietnam, Spain, Singapore, Italy, Netherlands, United States, United Kingdom
- Key people: Bachtiar Karim (Executive Chairman and CEO); Burhan Karim (COO); Bahari Karim (CFO
- Revenue: $7.6 billion (2018)
- Number of employees: 37,000
- Website: www.musimmas.com

Musim Mas Group is an Indonesian food processing company operating globally in the palm oil industry, with a presence in 13 countries spanning Asia-Pacific, Europe, North America, and South America. The group owns a significant network of palm oil refineries and is involved in vegetable oil refining. Additionally, it manufactures consumer goods such as soap and cooking oil brands in Indonesia. The company employes 37,000 people and utilizes a logistics network that includes chemical and coastal tankers, barges, tugboats, and bulk installations at major ports in Indonesia and other locations worldwide.

Musim Mas is a privately owned company managed by the Karim brothers: Bachtiar Karim, Bahari Karim, and Burhan Karim. In addition to its involvement in the palm oil industry, the company has interests in real estate and owns the 4-star Mikie Holiday Resorts in Berastagi, North Sumatra.

== History ==
In 1932, Anwar Karim founded the Nam Cheong Soap Factory in Medan, North Sumatra, what would later become Musim Mas.

In 1970 the company commissioned its first palm oil refinery in Belawan, Indonesia. In 1972, PT Musim Mas was officially established in Tanjung Mulia, Medan. The company expanded its operations in 1988 by starting its plantation in Rantau Prapat, North Sumatra. Two years later, in 1990, Musim Mas set up its first kernel-crushing plant in Medan and in 1991, it established its first palm oil mill in Rantau Prapat.

In 2002, Musim Mas set up its first subsidiary office, Inter-Continental Oil and Fats Pte. Ltd. (ICOF) in Malaysia. ICOF is a part of the Musim Mas Group and merchandises and distributes Musim Mas products.

In 2003, Musim Mas commenced operations for its oleochemicals plant located in the Medan Industrial Area II (KIM II). The following year, Musim Mas was the first company in Indonesia to achieve Roundtable on Sustainable Palm Oil (RSPO) certification.

The company opened its first office in Europe in 2007 and in the US in 2008.

In 2013, Musim Mas opened its first office in Vietnam.

In 2014, the company inaugurated three biodiesel plants in Europe and its first refinery in Tanjung Langsat, Malaysia. In 2016, Musim Mas acquired the company Dutch Glycerin Refinery in Groningen, The Netherlands.

In 2017, the company established a joint venture with Genting Plantations to set up a refinery in Lahad Datu, Malaysia, and acquired a sulfation plant in Barbastro, Spain.

In 2019, the company launched the Novel IDEAS Center, an R&D and Innovation facility located in Singapore.

== Cooking oil export corruption scandal ==
In April 2022, Musim Mas was named as one of several palm oil companies implicated in a corruption case brought by Indonesia's Attorney General's Office (AGO) over the issuance of crude palm oil export permits. Prosecutors alleged that Musim Mas, Wilmar Group, and Permata Hijau Group had conspired with a trade ministry official, Indrasari Wisnu Wardhana, to obtain export approvals without meeting the government's domestic market obligation during a nationwide cooking oil shortage. The company's general manager, Togar Sitanggang, was named a suspect in the case.

In March 2025, a Jakarta court acquitted the three companies of the charges. The acquittal was subsequently linked to a bribery scheme in which lawyers for the companies were alleged to have paid around 60 billion rupiah (about US$3.6 million) to judges and court officials to secure a favourable ruling, leading to the arrest of several judges and lawyers in April 2025. On 15 September 2025, Indonesia's Supreme Court granted the prosecutors' appeal and overturned the acquittals, convicting Musim Mas, Wilmar, and Permata Hijau of corruption.

== Products ==
Musim Mas offers a wide range of products including biodiesel, bleaching earth, bypass fats/rumen bypass fats, commodities, cooking oils, emulsifier-stabilizer blends, emulsifiers, esters, fatty acids, fatty alcohols, household products, margarine/shortening, medium-chain triglycerides, palm wax, refined glycerine, soap/skin care/hygiene products, soap noodles, specialty application oils, specialty fats, surfactants, and vitamin E.

The company owns more than 70 branded products that are distributed globally, including cooking oils, margarines, and soaps. Brands include Lervia, Medicare, and Harmony soaps, Sunco cooking oil, and Surya Gold, Margareta, Rajni Gold, and Kevolve Dr MCT.

== Sustainability ==
In 2014, Musim Mas introduced a new sustainability policy, stating a commitment to producing deforestation-free palm oil.

The company says it takes measures to mitigate its greenhouse gas emissions by capturing and converting methane gas into energy to power their mills and estates. According to the company, all of Musim Mas' mills are equipped with methane capture facilities, known as biogas plants.

In 2019, Musim Mas attained POIG (Palm Oil Innovation Group) verification and one of ifs processing mills was certified with RSPO (Roundtable on Sustainable Palm Oil) P&C (Principles and Criteria) 2018.

In 2021, Musim Mas announced a partnership with AAK and Nestlé to address deforestation outside of plantation concession areas in Aceh, Indonesia. The partnership aims to engage approximately 1,000 independent oil palm smallholders within two years, enrolling them in Musim Mas' smallholders program supported by a Smallholders Hub.

In early 2026, a Dutch subsidiary of Musim Mas, Dutch Glycering Refinery (DGR), was accused of dumping ten-thousands of tons of waste salt as a 'soil improver' via a fraudulent network of manure traders, knowing the salt could not be used as soil improver, to save millions of euros in waste processing.

== Awards ==
Musim Mas received the "Indonesian Best Exporter Award (Primaniyarta Award)" in 1992.
