= Tahir (Indonesian businessman) =

Indonesian billionaire and banking and property magnate

Tahir SSAP
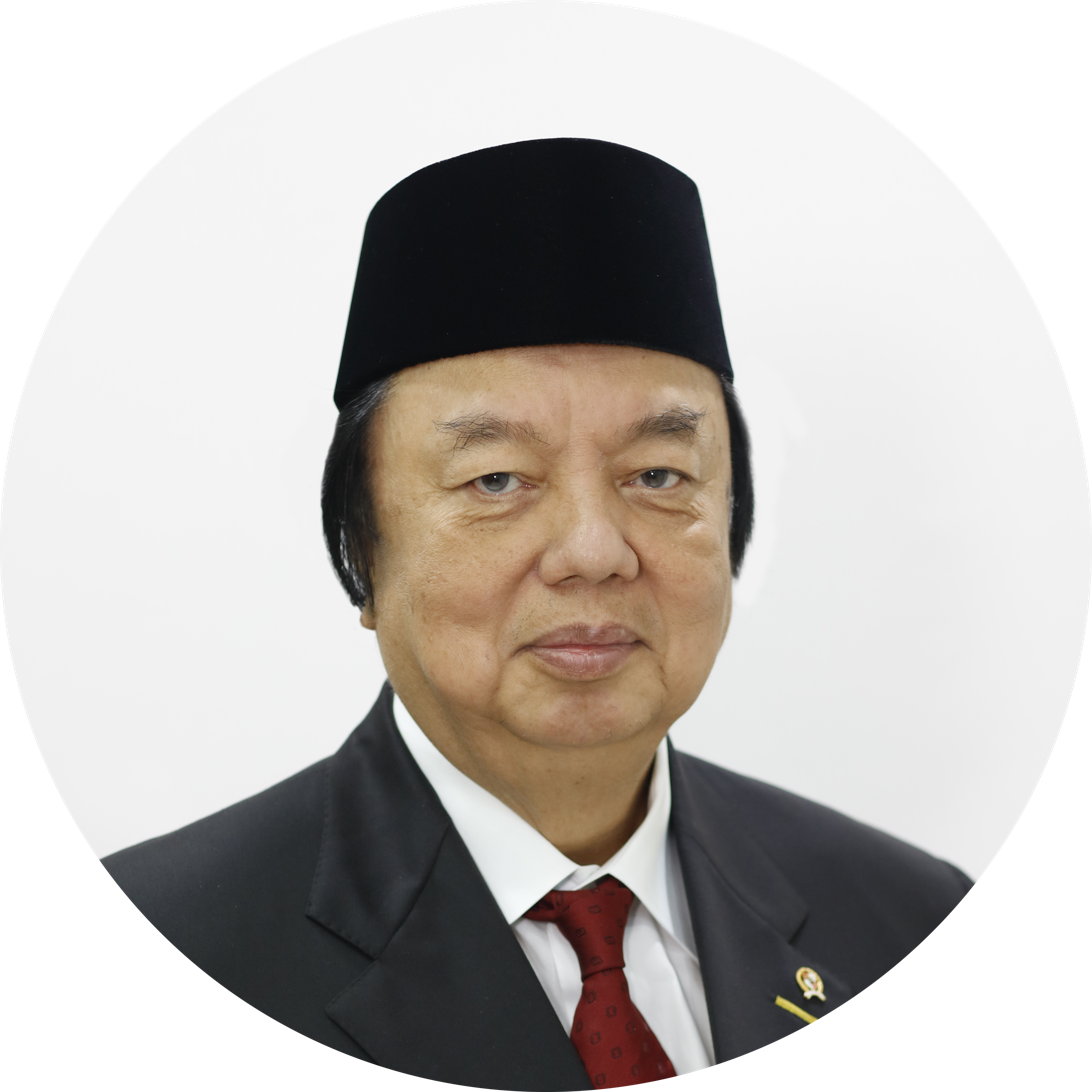

Member of Presidential Advisory Council of the Republic of Indonesia
- Incumbent
- Assumed office 13 December 2019 Serving with List: Wiranto (chairman); Sidarto Danusubroto; Agung Laksono; Tahir; Putri Kuswisnuwardhani; Muhamad Mardiono; Arifin Panigoro (2019–2022); Soekarwo
- President: Joko Widodo

Personal details
- Born: Ang Tjoen Ming 翁俊民; 26 March 1952 (age 74) Surabaya, East Java, Indonesia
- Citizenship: Indonesia
- Spouse: Rosy Riady (m. 1974)
- Children: Jane Tahir; Grace Tahir; Victoria Tahir; Jonathan Tahir
- Parent(s): Ang Boen Ing; Lie Tjien Lien
- Relatives: Mochtar Riady; James Riady
- Education: Nanyang Technological University; Golden Gate University
- Occupation: Businessman
- Website: www.mayapadagroup.com

Dato' Sri Tahir, born Ang Tjoen Ming (Chinese: 翁俊民; Pe̍h-ōe-jī: Ang Tsùn Bîn; born 26 March 1952) is an Indonesian billionaire, and a banking and property magnate. He is the founder of the Mayapada Group. On 13 December 2019, President Joko Widodo appointed Tahir to the Presidential Advisory Council. He is married to the daughter of Indonesian billionaire Mochtar Riady.

== Early life and education ==
Tahir was born in Surabaya, East Java, in 1952, in a slum area. He was raised by his parents who made a living by constructing pedicabs, known as becak. In 1971, he graduated from Petra Kalianyar Christian High School in Surabaya. Tahir wanted to be a medical doctor, but when his father fell sick and could not afford his medical school tuition, Tahir dropped out of college to focus on helping with his father's business.

He received a scholarship from Nanyang Technological Institute (now Nanyang Technological University) in Singapore, earning a Bachelor of Arts/Science. At the age of 35, he went to Golden Gate University in California and completed his Master's degree in financial education.

== Business career ==
During his studies in Singapore, Tahir started small trade business, buying merchandise from Singapore and selling it in Surabaya when he went home for vacation. This business was his introduction to import trading. In 1986, he established The Mayapada Group and expanded the business to many sectors including garments, finance, automobiles, health and media. During the 1997-98 Asian monetary crisis, Mayapada Bank survived even though many other banking corporations collapsed, because the bank was not taking credit from international sources.

== Philanthropy ==
In 2013, Tahir contributed more than US$100 million to the Bill & Melinda Gates Foundation, an organization that provides funding for efforts to fight major diseases such as HIV/AIDS, Tuberculosis, polio and malaria.

== Honours ==
=== National ===
- Indonesia:
  - Star of Mahaputera, 5th Class (Indonesian: Bintang Mahaputera Nararya) - 2018
  - Bintang Jasa Utama - 2015

=== Foreign ===
- Malaysia:
  - Pahang :
    - Grand Knight of the Order of Sultan Ahmad Shah of Pahang (SSAP) – Dato' Sri
