= Mayapada =

Indonesian conglomerate

Mayapada Group
- Mayapada Tower 1 in Jakarta, the headquarters of Mayapada Group
- Type: Holding company
- Industry: Conglomerate
- Founded: 1986
- Founder: Dato Sri Tahir
- Headquarters: Jakarta, Indonesia
- Key people: Dato Sri Tahir (Chairman); Jonathan Tahir (CEO)
- Products: Retail property telecommunication media
- Services: Financial services
- Owner: Tahir family
- Website: mayapadagroup.com

The Mayapada Group is an Indonesian-based conglomerate founded by Dato Sri Tahir in 1986. Tahir started this with a garment and textile manufacturing business, and four years later, he founded Bank Mayapada . The garment business no longer exists. The bank went public at the Jakarta Stock Exchange and survived the 1997 economic crisis and managed to expand further after the crisis. With foreign investment partners from the US, UAE and Singapore, the bank now has over 100 branches throughout Indonesia, and in 2007 has been voted as the second best public bank outside state-owned banks by InfoBank magazine, a banking magazine in Indonesia. Mayapada also concerns;

- The retail industry through partnership with Duty Free Shoppers owned by LVMH, with shops in Jakarta and Bali.
- The property industry with four office towers in the Jakarta CBD area, Mayapada Tower, Menara Topas, Permata Tower 1 and Sona Topas Tower. In Bali, Mayapada developed Mal Bali Galleria, the largest mall in the island, and all-suites Regent Bali Hotel and Residence in Sanur district.
- The healthcare industry, running a hospital and building another one called Mayapada Hospital.

Tahir is a Christian and lives in Jakarta with his family. He has also been appointed to the board of trustees at the University of California, Berkeley, becoming the first man from Southeast Asia to hold this position. Through the Tahir Foundation, Tahir has made charitable donations to numerous fields including healthcare, education, legal reformation and has contributed a combined $200 million investment alongside the Bill & Melinda Gates Foundation into tacking social and welfare problems in Indonesia.

Tahir earned his MBA from Golden Gate University in 1987. His doctorate is an honorary degree from the University of Surabaya in 2008.

== History ==
Mayapada Group first operation was said to have been started in the 1980s, while Tahir started his first business venture by becoming a distributor of Suzuki cars in Indonesia in which ended in failure. After failure in car distribution, Tahir shifted his business focus to textile industry and founded PT Mayatexdian Industry with financial aid from his father-in-law Mochtar Riady who's a founder of Lippo Group. After its founding in 1987, Mayatexdian become one of the largest textile players in the country which has exported its products to United States, European Union, and Japan. Due to the need of efficiency, Mayatexdian merged 3 other textile companies that are also owned by Tahir all located in Jakarta. In 1990s, Tahir handed his textile business to other businessman Robby Tjahjadi to focus in another business venture.

After the October 1988 decree that liberalized banking sector in Indonesia, like other conglomerates, Tahir entered the banking industry by launching his own bank, Bank Mayapada in 1990. In 1997, Bank Mayapada made an initial public offering to the Jakarta Stock Exchange and at the same year became one of very few banks that were unaffected by the 1997 Asian financial crisis.

== Donation ==
In April 2011, Tahir donated $1 million to the University of California, Berkeley, for international student fellowships for students in the full-time MBA program at Berkeley-Haas. He was a member of the university's board of trustees.

== Business units ==
- PT Banten Media Global Televisi (Loka TV)
- PT Intermedia Promosindo (Guo Ji Ri Bao 國際日報)
- PT Wahana Mediatama (Forbes)
- PT Elia Mediatama Indonesia (Elle)
- PT Bank Mayapada Internasional Tbk (Bank Mayapada)
- PT Mayapada Pratama Kasih
  - PT Sompo Insurance Indonesia (Sompo)
- PT Mayapada Prasetya Prakarsa
  - PT Zurich Topas Life (Zurich Life)
- PT Sejahteraraya Anugrahjaya Tbk (Rumah Sakit Mayapada)
  - PT Mayapada Clinic Pratama (Mayapada Clinic)
  - PT Agave Biomedi Investama (Biomedilab)
- PT Mayapada Properti Indonesia Tbk
  - PT Precise Pacific Realty (Mayapada Tower)
    - Mayapada Tower 1
    - Mayapada Tower 2
  - Mayapada Banua Center
    - The Grand Banua
    - Sky Pavilion
    - Mayapada Office Tower
  - Regent Bali Hotel and Residence
  - Fairmont Sanur Beach Bali
  - Mall Bali Galleria
- PT Sona Topas Tourism Industry Tbk (Sonatour)
  - PT Inti Dufree Promosindo (DFS)
- Tahir Foundation

== Former business ==
- PT Karya Kreatif Bersama (Topas TV)
- PT Metropolitan Televisindo (RTV) (sold 20% minority to Rajawali Corpora)
