= List of Chinese Indonesians =

This is a list of notable Chinese Indonesians. It contains the names of various Chinese Indonesian figures, by both ethnicity and ancestry. The list is sorted by the first letter of their name (Alan Budikusuma) and family name (Goei Djien Phang).

== Academics ==
- Arief Budiman (Soe Hok Djin; Chinese: 史福仁), sociologist, professor at the University of Melbourne, formerly at Satya Wacana Christian University, and brother of Soe Hok Gie
- Aggy Tjetje (Jauw Tjoe Gie), Indonesian academician
- Hadi Soesastro (Tan Yueh Ming; Chinese: 陳余明), economist, political scientist, founder and former executive director of Centre for Strategic and International Studies (Indonesia)
- Indrawati Oey, food scientist
- James Danandjaja (Chinese: 陳士林; pinyin: Tan Soe Lien), anthropologist
- Jusuf Wanandi (Lim Bian Kie; Chinese: 林綿基), political scientist
- Leo Suryadinata (Liauw Kian Djoe; Chinese: 廖建裕), sinologist
- Ong Hok Ham (Chinese: 王福涵), historian
- Tjan Tjoe Som (Chinese: 曾珠森), sinologist
- Mely G. Tan (Tan Giok Lan; Chinese: 陳玉蘭), sociologist
- Merlyna Lim, professor and Canada Research Chair
- Soe Tjen Marching (Chinese: 史曾), academic, composer, and writer
- Wang Gungwu, historian (simplified Chinese: 王赓武; traditional Chinese: 王賡武)
- Yohanes Surya, psychist and author

== Activists ==
- Aw Tjoei Lan, social activist, philanthropist, community leader, and founder of the charity organization Ati Soetji
- Dede Oetomo (Chinese: 溫忠孝; pinyin: Un Tiong Hau), gender and LGBT rights activist
- Lie Eng Hok (Chinese: 李英福), Indonesian independence activist and political prisoner, declared a Pioneer of Independence in 1959
- Melki Sedek Huang, activist and politician; formerly served as chairman of the Student Executive Board at University of Indonesia
- Phoa Keng Hek (Chinese: 潘景赫), social activist, founding president of Tiong Hoa Hwe Koan, and one of the founders of Institut Teknologi Bandung
- Soe Hok Gie (Chinese: 史朱義), activist
- Thung Sin Nio (Chinese: 湯新娘), women's rights activist, physician, economist and politician
- Yap Thiam Hien (Chinese: 葉添興), human rights lawyer

== Architect ==
- Liem Bwan Tjie, pioneering figure of modern Indonesian architecture

== Authors ==
- Clara Ng, novelist
- Kho Ping Hoo (Chinese: 許平和), short story writer and novelist
- Khoe Trima Nio, short story writer and novelist
- Kwee Kek Beng (Chinese: 郭克明), journalist and writer
- Kwee Tek Hoay (Chinese: 郭德怀), writer, important proponent of Tri-Dharma, credited with the publication of Dharma Moestika (1932–1934) and a list of publications
- Lie Kim Hok (Chinese: 李金福), teacher and writer who authored Tjhit Liap Seng and Malajoe Batawi
- Lie Loan Lian Nio (Chinese: 李來蓮娘), translator of Chinese novels into Malay
- Lie On Moy, translator of Chinese stories into Malay and journalist
- Lie Sim Djwe (Chinese: 李心志), translator and novelist
- Marga Tjoa (Tjoa Liang Tjoe; Chinese: 蔡良珠), novelist
- Mira W., novelist
- Myra Sidharta (Auw Jong Tjhoen Moy; Chinese: 歐陽春梅), writer and academician
- Nio Joe Lan (Chinese: 梁友蘭), writer, journalist, and history teacher
- Nyonya The Tiang Ek, real name Lie Djien Nio, writer, journalist and translator
- Oen Tjhing Tiauw (Chinese: 温清兆), writer, playwright, cultural activist and politician
- Tan Boen Soan (Chinese: 陳文宣), writer and journalist
- Tan Gin Ho, writer and associated with the influential Tan family of Cirebon
- Tan Hong Boen (Chinese: 陳豐文), writer and translator
- Tan Tjeng Nio, author of a book of Syair poems published in 1897
- Thé Tjong-Khing (Chinese: 郑宗琼), Dutch children's book artist, and author
- The Liep Nio, writer
- Thio Tjin Boen (Chinese: 張振文), journalist and author of Tjerita Oeij Se
- Tio Ie Soei (Chinese: 趙雨水), writer and author of Sie Po Giok

== Beauty queens ==
- Astrid Yunadi, contestant of Miss Indonesia 2011 and top 15 finalist of Miss World 2011
- Ayu Gani, winner of Asia's Next Top Model (cycle 3)
- Imelda Fransisca, contestant of Miss Indonesia 2005 and runner up Miss ASEAN 2005
- Karenina Sunny Halim, half-American contestant of Miss Indonesia 2009
- Kevin Lilliana, half-Sundanese contestant of Miss Indonesia International 2017 and winner of Miss International 2017
- Kezia Warouw, contestant of Miss Universe Indonesia 2016 and top 13 finalist of Miss Universe 2016
- Maria Selena, contestant of Miss Universe Indonesia 2011
- Nadine Chandrawinata (Chinese: 曾納丁; Pe̍h-ōe-jī: Zēng Nà Dīng), actress, model, and contestant of Puteri Indonesia 2005
- Natasha Mannuela Halim, contestant of Miss Indonesia 2016 and 2nd runner-up of Miss World 2016
- Sandra Angelia, contestant of Miss Indonesia 2008
- Sonia Fergina Citra, contestant of Miss Universe Indonesia 2018, top 10 finalist of Miss Oriental Tourism 2012, and contestant of Miss Universe 2018
- Vania Larissa, contestant of Miss Indonesia 2013 and top 10 finalist of Miss World 2013

== Businesspeople ==
- Alexander Tedja, businessman, founder of Pakuwon Jati
- Alim Markus (Liem Boen Kwang; Chinese: 林文光), businessman, founder and owner of Maspion
- Anthoni Salim (Liem Hong Sien; Chinese: 林逢生), businessman and investor, current chairman of First Pacific
- Andrew Darwis, entrepreneur and founder of Kaskus
- Arsyad Rasjid, chairman of the Indonesian Chamber of Commerce and Industry (KADIN)
- Bachtiar Karim (Liem Jah Kian; Chinese: 林益建), businessman and owner of Musim Mas
- Boenjamin Setiawan (Khouw Liep Boen; Chinese: 許立文), businessman and owner of Kalbe Farma
- Burhan Uray (Bong Swan An; Chinese: 黃雙安), entrepreneur and philanthropist
- Carlo Tabalujan (Tan Tjin Hin; Chinese: 譚欣下巴), founder of PT Nestlé Indonesia, Danmotor Vespa and Kawasaki Motor Indonesia
- Cherie Nursalim (Chinese: 林美金; Pe̍h-ōe-jī: Lîm Bí Kim), vice chairman of Giti Corporation
- Ciputra (Tjie Tjin Hoan; Chinese: 徐振焕), philanthropist, founder of Ciputra Development, and Forbes' 23rd richest Indonesian
- Djoko Susanto (Kwok Kwie Fo; Chinese: 郭貴和), conglomerate and businessman, founder of AlfaCorp
- Eddie Lembong (Ong Joe San; Chinese: 汪友山), businessman and founder of Pharos Indonesia
- Edwin Soeryadjaya (Tjia Han Phoen; Chinese: 謝重生), businessman and the owner of Saratoga Investment
- Eka Tjandranegara (Tjan Kok Hui; Chinese: 曾國奎), one of the founders and the current owner of Mulia Group
- Eka Tjipta Widjaja (Oei Ek Tjhong; Chinese: 黃奕聰), businessman and conglomerate, founder of Sinar Mas
- Hary Tanoesoedibjo (Chinese: 陳明立; Pe̍h-ōe-jī: Tân Bîng Li̍p), founder of MNC Group and Perindo Party
- James Riady (Lie Zen; Chinese: 李白), businessman, deputy chairman of the Lippo Group, a major Indonesian conglomerate
- Jusuf Hamka (Chinese: 周安; Pe̍h-ōe-jī: Jauw A Loen), Chinese Muslim businessman and politician
- Kan Keng Tjong, businessman and tycoon
- Khouw Khe Hien (Chinese: 許启興), pioneering aviator
- Kimun Ongkosandjojo (Ong Kiem Oen; Chinese: 王金温), co-founder of Jamu Air Mancur
- Liem Seeng Tee, businessman, founder of Sampoerna
- Liem Sioe Liong (Chinese: 林绍良), founder Salim Group and BCA
- Leo Ko Guan (Chinese: 廖凯原), founder of SHI International Corp, the 3rd largest shareholder in Tesla, Inc.
- Low Tuck Kwong, businessman, founder of Bayan Resources
- Michael Bambang Hartono (Oei Hwie Siang; Chinese: 黄惠祥), founder of Djarum and owner of BCA
- Mochtar Riady (Lie Mo Tie; Chinese: 李文正), founder of Lippo Group
- Njoo Han Siang (Chinese: 楊漢祥), pioneer of Indonesian banking and filming industry
- Nyonya Meneer (Lauw Ping Nio), businesswomen, founder of the Nyonya Meneer Jamu company
- Oei Tiong Ham (Chinese: 黃仲涵), business magnate and tycoon
- Oei Tjie Sien (Chinese: 黃志信), tycoon, founder of Kian Gwan
- Prajogo Pangestu (Phang Djoen Phen; Chinese: 彭雲鵬), business magnate, investor, philanthropist
- Robert Budi Hartono (Oei Hwie Tjhong; Chinese: 黄惠忠), founder of Djarum and owner of BCA
- Sofjan Wanandi (Lim Bian Khoen; Chinese: 林綿坤), owner of Gemala Group
- Sugianto Kusuma (A guan; Chinese: 郭再源), business tycoon and owner of Agung Sedayu group.
- Sukanto Tanoto (Tan Kang Hoo; Chinese: 陳江和), founder of Raja Garuda Mas International (now Royal Golden Eagle)
- Surya Wonowidjoyo (Tjoa Ing Hwie Chinese: 蔡雲輝), cigarette entrepreneur and founder of Gudang Garam
- Susilo Wonowidjojo (Tjoa Too Pieng Chinese: 蔡道平), cigarette entrepreneur and owner of Gudang Garam
- Sutanto Djuhar (Liem Oen Kian; Chinese: 林文鏡), co-founder of Salim Group
- Tahir (Ang Tjoen Ming; Chinese: 翁俊民), founder of Mayapada Bank
- Tan Khoen Swie (Chinese: 陳坤瑞), publisher
- Teddy Yip (Jap Tek Lie; Chinese: 葉德利), founder of Macau Grand Prix
- Tio Tek Hong, Colonial era businessman, pioneer of the Indonesian music recording industry and founder of the Tio Tek Hong store
- Tjong A Fie (Chong Yeu Hian; Chinese: 張鴻南), businessman and banker
- Tjong Yong Hian (Chinese: 張爵幹), businessman
- Tong Djoe (Chinese: 唐裕), businessman
- Tomy Winata (Kwek Seh Hong; Chinese: 郭說鋒), businessman and founder of Artha Graha Group
- William Soeryadjaya (Tjia Kian Liong; Chinese: 謝建隆), founder of Astra International
- William Tanuwijaya, entrepreneur and founder of Tokopedia
- Yap Goan Ho (Chinese: 葉源和), translator and publisher

== Criminals ==
- Anton Medan (Tan Hok Liang), former crime boss
- Djoko Tjandra (Tjan Kok Hui; Chinese: 曾國輝, businessman and felon
- Eddy Tansil (Tan Tjoe Hong; Chinese: 陳珠芳), businessman and runaway criminal
- Oey Tamba Sia (Chinese: 黃陶謝), playboy, tycoon's heir and criminal
- Rudy Kurniawan, wine fraudster

== Economists ==
- Christianto Wibisono (Oey Kian Kok; Chinese: 黃建國), economics analyst
- Thee Kian Wie (Chinese: 戴建偉), economic historian and founder of LIPI

== Entertainers ==
- Abimana Aryasatya, actor
- Agnez Mo (Chinese: 楊詩曼; Pe̍h-ōe-jī: Iûnn Si Bān), singer-songwriter, record producer, composer, actress, presenter, rapper, author, businesswoman, dancer, model, and philanthropist
- Ateng (Kho Tjeng Lie; Chinese: 邱誠烈), comedian
- Ayu Ting Ting, dangdut singer
- Baim Wong, actor
- Brandon Salim, actor and musician
- Boy William, actor
- Chelsea Olivia Wijaya, actress and model
- Christian Sugiono, actor and model
- Chrisye, singer
- Clarine Clay, actress and writer
- Claudia Emmanuela Santoso, singer
- Daniel Mananta, presenter, model, and fashion designer
- David Noah, musician, member of the band Noah
- Deddy Corbuzier, presenter and magician
- Didik Nini Thowok (Kwee Tjoen An), dancer
- Dion Wiyoko, presenter and actor
- Eriska Rein, actor and model
- Ernest Prakasa, comedian
- Fendy Chow, model and actor
- Ferry Salim, model, actor and philanthropist
- Fitria Yusuf, fashion model and writer
- George Rudy (Tjwan Hien), actor and presenter
- Gisella Anastasia, actress, singer, and model
- Glenn Alinskie, actor
- Goh Soon Tioe (Chinese: 吴顺筹), conductor, pedagogue, and violinist
- Hamzah Sulaeman, actor
- Heaven Tanudiredja, fashion designer
- Henky Solaiman (Ong Han Kie), actor, producer and screen writer
- Hessel Steven, model and actor
- Hoo Eng Djie (Chinese: 何荣日), songwriter and poet
- Ian Antono (Jauw Hian Ling), Rock musician and songwriter, member of God Bless
- Jahja Ling (Chinese: 林望傑; pinyin: Lín Wàng Jié), conductor, music director
- Jaya Suprana (Phoa Kok Tjiang; Chinese: 潘郭蔣), businessman, head of Jamu Jago, comedian, composer, and musician
- Jenny Tan, presenter
- Joe Taslim, actor, model and martial artist
- Julie Estelle, actress and model
- Jonas Rivanno, actor and model
- Kevin Anggara, actor and writer
- Kevin Lim, singer and songwriter
- Leila Tong (Kong Lai Na; Chinese: 江麗娜), actress
- Lo Lieh (Chinese: 罗烈), actor
- Livi Zheng, film producer and director
- Malea Emma, singer, actress
- Mariana Renata, actress and model
- Melvis (Kwok Lam Sang; Chinese: 郭琳生), Elvis impersonator
- Mey Chan, singer
- Mike Lewis, actor and model
- Morgan Oey, actor, singer
- Natasha Wilona, actress
- Nathan Hartono (Chinese: 向洋; pinyin: Xiàng Yáng), singer
- Nicky Astria, singer
- Okan Kornelius, actor and model
- Peter Sudarso, actor
- Rafael Landry Tanubrata, singer, songwriter, dancer
- Rich Brian, rapper, singer, record producer, and songwriter
- Roy Kiyoshi, actor and television personality
- Sandra Angelia, presenter and model
- Sandra Dewi, actress and presenter
- Saridjah Niung, also known as Ibu Sud, musician, teacher, radio announcer, playwright and batik artist
- Shavlyne, actress
- Shanice Margaretha, actress and model
- Shindy Huang, actress and model
- Sisca Kohl, internet celebrity
- Stefan William, actor and singer
- Tan De Seng, musician and artist, maestro of Karwitan
- Tan Tjeng Bok, actor
- Tan Tjoei Hock, journalist and director
- Teguh Karya (Steve Liem Tjoan Hok; Chinese: 林廉鹤), director
- Teguh Slamet Rahardjo (Kho Tjien Tiong), actor and comedian
- The Teng Chun (Chinese: 郑丁春), director
- Titi DJ, pop singer, songwriter, and beauty pageant titleholder
- Vania Larissa, singer
- Verdi Solaiman, actor
- Willy Dozan (Chuang Chen Li; Chinese: 庄陳力), actor and martial artist
- Wilbert Ross (born Wilbert Marcelo Rosalyn), Filipino actor, singer and dancer whose paternal grandfather is an Indonesian of Chinese descent who migrated to Davao, Philippines
- Warren Hue, rapper, singer, record producer and songwriter
- Wim Umboh, director
- Wong Brothers (Nelson, Joshua, and Othniel Wong), directors
- Yoshi Sudarso, actor
- Zack Lee, actor and model

== Journalists ==
- Ang Jan Goan (Chinese: 洪渊源), journalist, publisher, political thinker, and director of Sin Po (1925–1959)
- Auw Jong Peng Koen (Chinese: 歐陽炳昆), co-founder of Kompas
- Hauw Tek Kong (Chinese: 侯德廣), newspaper editor and founder of Keng Po
- Kho Tjoen Wan (Chinese: 許俊源), journalist for Perniagaan, Sinar Hindia and Warna Warta
- Lauw Giok Lan (Chinese: 劉玉蘭), journalist, writer and one of the founders of the newspaper Sin Po
- Phoa Tjoen Hoat (Chinese: 潘春發), journalist and editor of Perniagaan, Warna Warta and Sinar Sumatra
- Phoa Tjoen Hoay (Chinese: 潘春怀), journalist and translator
- Siem Piet Nio (Chinese: 沈泌娘), early feminist writer and journalist under the pen name Hong Le Hoa for Panorama and other magazines

== Military personnel ==
- Daniel Tjen, neurologist and mayor general of the Indonesian Armed Forces
- Djoni Matius (Liem Wong Siu; Chinese: 林王小)), chief warrant officer of the Indonesian Marine Corps
- John Lie (Lie Tjeng Tjoan; Chinese: 李約翰), a national hero who served the Indonesian Navy by setting up clandestine weapons procurement operations during the Dutch blockades from 1947 to 1949, continued serving the Navy during the 1961–1963 Mandala campaigns before retiring as rear admiral
- Kuntara, former general commander of Kopassus and former Indonesian ambassador to China
- Rudi Taran (Rudi Tjong), air marshal of the Indonesian Air Force
- Teddy Jusuf (Him Tek Jie; Chinese: 熊德怡), first Chinese-Indonesian to attain the rank of brigadier general on the Indonesian Army
- Kyai Ronggo Ngabehi Soero Pernollo (Han Tjien Kong; Chinese: 韓錢江), nobleman, police chief, bureaucrat and founder of the Muslim branch of the Han family of Lasem

== Nobility ==
- Han Siong Kong, patriarch and founder of the Han family of Lasem
- Kang Cing Wie, 12th-century Chinese woman who married the Balinese king Jayapangus; goddess of prosperity in traditional Balinese culture
- Pati Unus, Second Sultan of the Demak Sultanate
- Raden Patah, the First Sultan of the Demak Sultanate
- Soero Adinegoro, nobleman and government official, temenggong of Bangil, ronggo of Besuki, and regent of Malang, Sidayu and Tuban

== Politicians ==
- Abdurrahman Wahid, 4th president of Indonesia
- Acep Purnama, regent of Kuningan (2016–2018, 2018–2023)
- Alex Indra Lukman, member of the House of Representatives (2014–2019, 2024–), member of the PDI-P
- Albertina Ho, former judge of the Supreme Court of Indonesia
- Alvin Lie (Lie Ling Piauw; Chinese: 李寧彪), member of Indonesian National Mandate Party (PAN)
- Amir Syamsuddin (Tan Toan Sin), former Indonesian Minister of Law and Human Rights (2011–2014)
- Andrei Angouw, mayor of Manado, member of the Regional House of representative of North Sulawesi (2009–2019)
- Angela Tanoesoedibjo, Vice Minister of Tourism and Creative Economy 2019–2024
- Han Bwee Kong, Kapitein der Chinezen of Surabaya, magnate, government official, and landlord in East Java, part of the Han family of Lasem
- Han Chan Piet, second Kapitein der Chinezen of Surabaya, magnate, government official and landlord, part of the Han family of Lasem
- Han Kik Ko, Kapitein der Chinezen of Pasuruan, Regent of Probolinggo, magnate, government official and landlord in East Java, part of the Han family of Lasem
- Han Tiauw Tjong Sia, prominent colonial Indonesian politician, engineer, community leader and a member of the influential Han family of Lasem
- Bob Hasan (The Kian Seng), former Minister of Forestry
- Basuki Tjahaja Purnama (Tjoeng Van Hok; Chinese: 鍾萬學), former governor of Jakarta (2014–2017) and CEO of Pertamina (2019–2024)
- Basuri Tjahaja Purnama (Tjoeng Wan Joe; Chinese: 鍾萬有), politician, former regent of East Belitung (2010–2015)
- Benny Alexander Liteloni (Chinese: 李振光), former vice governor of East Nusa Tenggara (2013–2018), former vice regent of South Central Timor Regency (2008–2013)
- Benny Laos, politician and businessman who served as the regent of Morotai (2017–2022)
- Budhi Sarwono (Sie Wing Tjien), former regent of Banjarnegara (2017–2022)
- Bong Ming Ming, vice regent of West Bangka (2021–2025), and former member of the Bangka Regional House of Representatives
- Cen Sui Lan, member of the House of Representatives (2020–2024), regent of Natuna (2025-present)
- Christiandy Sanjaya (Bong Hon San; Chinese: 黃漢山), former vice governor of West Kalimantan (2008–2013, 2013–2018), and Indonesia's first Chinese deputy governor
- Charles Honoris, member of House of Representatives and the Indonesian Democratic Party of Struggle
- Darmadi Durianto (Lin Dechun; Chinese: 林德純), member of the House of Representatives
- David Gee Cheng, Deputy Minister for City Planning and Construction (1964–1966)
- Enggartiasto Lukita (Loe Joe Eng; Chinese: 呂有恩), former Indonesian Minister of Trade
- Erick Thohir, current Minister of State Owned Enterprises
- Edward Tannur, politician and businessman, former member of the House of Representatives
- Hanny Sondakh, politician, mayor of Bitung (2006–2011, 2011–2016)
- Hendrawan Supratikno, politician and member of the House of Representatives
- Hermawi Taslim, politician
- Hok Hoei Kan (Chinese: 福輝舍簡), colonial politician, landlord, patrician and founding president of Chung Hwa Hui
- Hidayat Arsani, vice governor of Bangka Belitung Islands (2014–2017) and the current governor of Bangka Belitung Islands (2025–2029)
- Ignasius Jonan, Minister of Energy and Mineral Resources (2016–2019)
- Jusuf Hamka (Jauw A Loen), politician, motivational speaker and businessman
- Jusuf Wanandi (Liem Bian Kie; Chinese: 林綿基), former student activist and former representative in the People’s Consultative Assembly, and founder of Centre for Strategic and International Studies
- Khouw Kim An (Chinese: 許金安), fifth and last Majoor der Chinezen (lit., Major of the Chinese) of Batavia (1910–1918)
- Kwik Kian Gie (Chinese: 郭建義), former Coordinating Minister of Economics and Finance (1999–2000) and Minister of National Development Planning (2001–2004)
- Liem Koen Hian (Chinese: 林群賢), journalist and politician
- Lie Kiat Teng (Chinese: 李傑登), former Minister of Health (1953–1955)
- Lie Tjoe Hong (Chinese: 李子鳳), third Majoor der Chinezen (lit. 'Major of the Chinese') of Batavia (1879–1896)
- Loa Sek Hie (Chinese: 賴錫禧), colonial politician, community leader, landlord, patrician, and founder of Pao An Tui
- Luo Fangbo (Lo Fong Pak; Chinese: 羅芳伯), politician, founding father of the Lanfang Republic
- Mari Pangestu (Phang Hoei Lan; Chinese: 馮慧蘭), former Indonesian Minister of Trade (2004–2011) and Minister of Tourism and Creative Economy (2011–2014)
- Markus, current regent of West Bangka regency (2019–2021, 2025–2030)
- Matheos Tan, current regent of Lembata (2023–2028)
- Mochammad Anton (Goei Hing An; Chinese: 魏廷安), politician, mayor of Malang (2013–2018)
- Mor Bastiaan, politician, vice mayor of Manado (2016–2021)
- Oei Tjoe Tat (Chinese: 黃自達), former Minister of State (1964–1966)
- Oey Djie San, former Landheer and Kapitein der Chinezen of Tangerang
- Ong Eng Die (Chinese: 王永利), economist, former Minister of Finance (1953–1955)
- Phoa Liong Gie (Chinese: 潘隆義舍), colonial politician, jurist, newspaper owner
- Ria Norsan, politician and businessman, current governor of West Kalimantan (2025–2029), vice governor of West Kalimantan (2018–2023) and regent of Mempawah (2008–2018)
- Ricky Jauwerissa, regent of Tanimbar Island (2025–2030)
- Rico Sia, member of the House of Representatives (2019–)
- Rudianto Tjen, member of the House of Representatives (2004–2009, 2009–2014, 2014–2019, 2019–2024, 2024–)
- Satono, politician, regent of Sambas (2021–2026)
- Sherly Tjoanda, politician and businesswoman who has served as the governor of North Maluku since 20 February 2025
- Siauw Giok Tjhan (Chinese: 蕭玉燦), politician, member of the Provisional House of Representatives and cabinet minister
- Sofyan Tan (Tan Kim Yang; Chinese: 陳金揚), politician and doctor, member of the House of Representatives representing North Sumatra (2019–2024, 2024–2029)
- Soero Adinegoro, nobleman and former government official (1752–1833)
- Souw Beng Kong, first Kapitein der Chinezen of Batavia
- Sudin, politician, member of the House of representatives (2009–2014, 2014–2019 and 2019–2024)
- Tan Eng Goan (Chinese: 陳永元), first Majoor der Chinezen of Batavia (1837–1865)
- Tan Po Goan (Chinese: 陳寶源), lawyer, Socialist Party of Indonesia politician, Minister without Portfolio in the Third Sjahrir Cabinet
- Tan Tjoen Tiat (Chinese: 陳浚哲), second Majoor der Chinezen of Batavia (1865–1879)
- Telly Tjanggulung, politician, former regent of Southeastern Minahasa (2008–2013)
- Thio Thiam Tjong (Chinese: 張添聰), politician and community leader, founding board member of Chung Hwa Hui and the Chinese Indonesian Democratic Party
- Thomas Lembong, former Indonesian Minister of Trade (2015–2016) and head of Investment Coordinating Board (2016–2019)
- Tio Tek Ho (Chinese: 趙德和), fourth Majoor der Chinezen of Batavia (1896–1907)
- Tjhai Chui Mei, mayor of Singkawang (2017–2022)
- Veronica Tan, politician and entrepreneur; deputy minister of Women Empowerment and Child Protection of Indonesia since 2024
- William Aditya Sarana, politician, current member of the Jakarta Regional House of Representatives
- Yap Tjwan Bing, Independence activist, politician and doctor, member of the Preparatory Committee for Indonesian Independence
- Yenny Wahid, politician and daughter of former president Abdurrahman Wahid

== Sportspeople ==
- Abraham Damar Grahita, basketball player
- Abraham Wenas, basketball player
- Ade Chandra, badminton player
- Agassi Goantara, basketball player
- Agus Indra Kurniawan, football player
- Agus Susanto (蔡宗滿), badminton player
- Alan Budikusuma (魏仁芳), badminton star and 1992 Olympic gold medalist
- Albertus Susanto Njoto (楊禮豐), badminton player
- Alvent Yulianto, badminton player
- Angelique Widjaja (黄依林), tennis athlete
- Antonius Ariantho, badminton star
- Ardy Wiranata, badminton player
- Aryono Miranat, badminton player, coach
- Arthur Irawan, football player
- Benny Wijaya (林秉超), tennis athlete
- Bobby Ertanto (葉忠明), badminton star
- Candra Wijaya (陳甲亮), badminton star and 2000 Summer Olympics gold medalist for men's doubles
- Charlie Depthios, weightlifter
- Chris John, boxing world champion formerly holding the WBA (Super) featherweight title (2004–2013)
- Christian Hadinata (紀明發), badminton star
- Cindana Hartono Kusuma (古愛金), badminton star
- Daniel Marthin, badminton player
- Daniel Wenas, basketball player
- Daud Yordan, boxing world champion and former IBO Featherweight and Lightweight Champion
- Debby Susanto, badminton star
- Denny Kantono (关有明), badminton star
- Denny Sumargo, basketball star
- Darmadi (黄培森), badminton player
- Eddy Hartono (洪忠中), badminton star
- Eddy Kurniawan (罗天宁), badminton star
- Edhi Handoko, chess grandmaster
- Ellen Angelina, badminton player and coach
- Elkan Baggott, football player
- Eng Hian (徐永賢), badminton star
- Endang Witarsa (林順有), football manager
- Febby Valencia Dwijayanti Gani, badminton player
- Ferry Sonneville, badminton star
- Fernando Kurniawan, badminton player
- Fran Kurniawan, badminton player
- Fung Permadi, badminton player
- Hadibowo Susanto (陳財富), badminton player
- Halim Haryanto (何学林), badminton star and coach
- Hariyanto Arbi, badminton player
- Harry Tjong, footballer and football manager
- Hendra Setiawan, badminton star
- Hendrawan (葉誠萬), badminton world champion
- Hermawan Susanto (蔡祥林), badminton star
- Herry Iman Pierngadi (彭伟信), badminton coach
- Hastomo Arbi, badminton star
- Hiong Liong Tan (陈香良), chess master
- Huang Hua (黄华), badminton star of China, later become a citizen of Indonesia
- Imron Roasadi, born Liu Nyok Siong, weightlifter
- Indra Gunawan, badminton player and coach
- Indra Wijaya, badminton player and coach
- Inesh Putri Chandra, professional golfer
- Ivana Lie (李英華), badminton player
- Janice Tjen, tennis player
- Jeffer Rosobin, badminton player
- Jenna Gozali, badminton player
- Johan Wahjudi (洪耀龍), badminton star
- John Juanda, poker player and star
- Jo Novita, badminton player
- Juan Revi, football player
- Justinus Lhaksana, futsal coach and football commentator
- Jonatan Christie, badminton star
- Lidya Djaelawijaya (劉沁薇), badminton star
- Liliyana Natsir, badminton player
- Lindswell Kwok (郭利娟), Wushu athlete
- Kim Kurniawan, football player
- Kevin Sanjaya Sukamuljo, badminton star
- Khouw Keng Nio, first woman aviator in China and Indonesia (qualified in March 1936)
- Komala Dewi, badminton player
- Kwee Kiat Sek, football player, part of squad Indonesia in 1956 Olympic in Melbourne
- Liang Qiuxia (梁秋霞), badminton star of China, later become a citizen of Indonesia and Indonesian coach
- Liem Swie King (林水鏡), badminton player
- Lius Pongoh (劉邦高), badminton player
- Liliyana Natsir, badminton star and 2016 Olympic gold medalist for mixed doubles
- Marcus Fernaldi Gideon, badminton star
- Maria Selena, basketball player
- Mei Joni, basketball player
- Minarti Timur (許一敏), badminton player
- Muljadi, born Ang Tjin Siang (翁振祥), badminton player
- Ng Ka Long (伍家朗), Hong Kong-based badminton of maternal Chinese Indonesian descent
- Nathan Tjoe-A-On, football player
- Nova Arianto, football player
- Praveen Jordan, badminton star
- Ricardo Moniz, Dutch-based football player of maternal Chinese Indonesian descent
- Rio Haryanto, Indonesian racer on Formula One for Manor Racing F1 Team in 2016 Formula One season
- Ronald Susilo (林香文), Singapore-based badminton star
- Ruben Gunawan, chess grandmaster
- Rudy Hartono, born Nio Hap Liang (梁海量), badminton player and 8-time winner of the All-England Cup
- Sean Gelael, racing driver
- Simon Santoso, badminton player
- Staffan Horito, football player
- Surya Lesmana, born Liem Soei Liang (林隋亮), football player
- Susi Susanti, born Ong Lien Hiang (王蓮香), badminton star and 1992 Olympic gold medalist
- Susyana Tjhan (陈慧嘉)), Wushu athlete
- Sutanto Tan (陳江和), football player
- Sydney Hopper, football player
- The Hong Djien, football player and player in the 1938 FIFA World Cup
- Tan Joe Hok (陳有福), Indonesia badminton player
- Tan Liong Houw, football player and participant of the 1956 Olympics
- Tan Mo Heng, football goalkeeper and player in the 1938 FIFA World Cup
- Tan See Han (, football players and player in the 1938 FIFA World Cup
- Tjun Tjun (梁春生), badminton star
- Tony Gunawan (吳俊明), badminton star and 2000 Olympic gold medalist for men's doubles
- Verawaty Fadjrin, badminton star
- Vincent Rivaldi Kosasih, basketball player
- Wong Wing Ki (黃永棋), Hong Kong-based badminton player of Chinese Indonesian descent
- Wynne Prakusya, tennis athlete

== Other ==
- Abraham Alex Tanuseputra (Tan Liat Gwian), founder of the Bethany Indonesian Church
- Daniel Bambang Dwi Byantoro (Chinese: 曹衡進; pinyin: Chao Heung Jin), founder of the Indonesian Orthodox Church
- Felix Siauw (Chinese: 蕭正國; pinyin: Siauw Chen Kwok), Islamic cleric, preacher, author and Islamist activist associated with Hizbut Tahrir
- Gabriel Manek, Roman catholic archbishop
- Insan Mokoginta, Ulama and Christology figure
- Stephen Tong (Chinese: 唐崇荣; pinyin: Táng Chóng Róng), Reformed Evangelical pastor
- Sunan Bonang, one of the Wali Songo of Indonesia
- Sunan Drajat, one of the Wali Songo of Indonesia
- Sylvester Tung Kiem San, bishop of Denpasar
- Tio Tjay, painter
- Tan Liep Poen, painter and writer
- Handojo Tjandrakusuma (Tjan Dhiam Bo), doctor specializing on disability rehabilitation
- Henricus Pidyarto Gunawan, bishop of Malang
- Joseph Theodorus Suwatan, bishop of Manado
- Lee Chin Koon, father of Lee Kuan Yew
- Lee Man Fong, painter
- Lo Siaw Ging (Thomas Becket Lo Siauw Ging), doctor and philanthropist
- Vincentius Sutikno Wisaksono (Oei Tik Hauw), bishop of Surabaya
- William Wongso, culinary expert

== See also ==
- Chen Fu Zhen Ren
- Chinese Indonesians
- Benteng Chinese
- Balinese Chinese
- Chinese in the Bangka Belitung Islands
- Chinese Maluku
- Supreme Council for the Confucian Religion in Indonesia
- Kong Koan & Tiong Hoa Hwee Koan
- Kapitan Cina & List of Kapitan Cina
- Sia (title)
- Discrimination against Chinese Indonesians
- Legislation on Chinese Indonesians
- 1740 Batavia massacre
- 1918 Kudus riot
- Jakarta Riots of May 1998
- List of Javanese people
- List of Acehnese people
- List of Batak people
- List of Bugis people
- List of Minangkabaus
- List of Moluccan people
- List of Sundanese people

== Bibliography ==
- Jahja, H. Junus (2002), Peranakan Idealis: Dari Lie Eng Hok sampai Teguh Karya (in Indonesian), Jakarta: Kepustakaan Populer Gramedia, ISBN 978-979-9023-84-1.
- Setyautama, Sam (2008), Mihardja, Suma (ed.), Tokoh-Tokoh Etnis Tionghoa di Indonesia (in Indonesian), Jakarta: Kepustakaan Populer Gramedia, ISBN 978-979-9101-25-9.
- Suryadinata, Leo (1995), Prominent Indonesian Chinese: Biographical Sketches (3rd ed.), Singapore: Institute of Southeast Asian Studies, ISBN 978-981-3055-04-9.
