= Mokoginta =

Mokoginta is a Mongondow surname. Notable people with the surname include:

- Abdullah Mokoginta (1935–2021), Indonesian politician
- Ahmad Yunus Mokoginta (1921–1984), Indonesian military officer
- Insan Mokoginta (1949–2020), Indonesian Islamic preacher
