= Lie Loan Lian Nio =

Chinese Indonesian translator

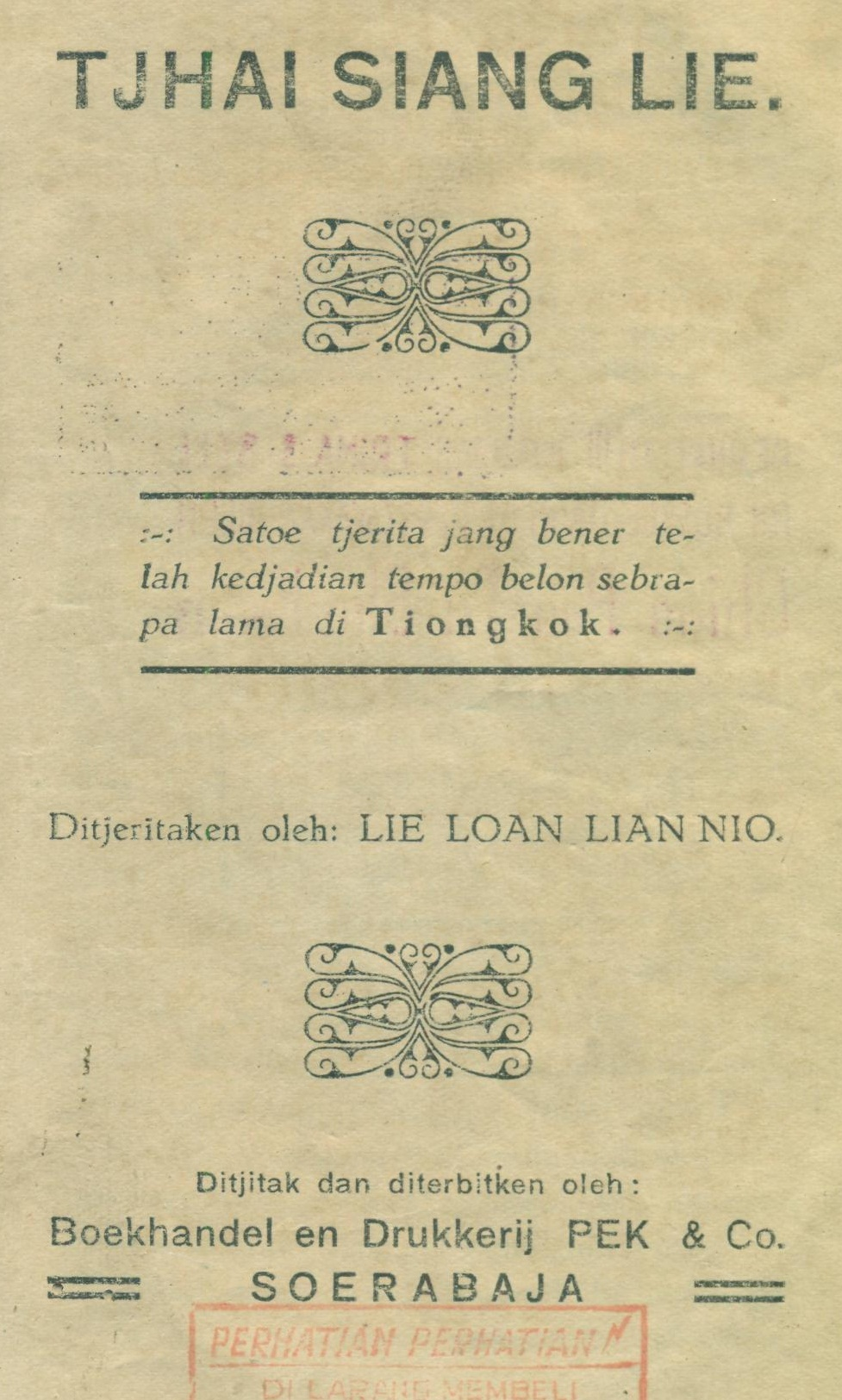
Cover of Tjhai Siang Lie, a Chinese novel translated into Malay by Lie Loan Lian Nio

Lie Loan Lian Nio (Chinese: 李來莲娘) was one of the earliest known woman translators of Chinese language novels into Malay in the Dutch East Indies. She was active in the 1920s and mostly translated for the magazine Tjerita Baroe.

== Biography ==
Little is known about Lie Loan Lian Nio, including her birthplace, birth date or educational background. She was most likely a Peranakan (assimilated, Malay-speaking Chinese) woman born at around the start of the twentieth century. Because Indies Chinese writers commonly published under pseudonyms, it may not have been her actual name either. She may have lived in East Java, where all her translations were printed.

Her first known publication of a translation was in 1921. At that time women in the Dutch East Indies had published poetry and translations of novels but there were not yet any original novels published by women; some of her translator contemporaries include Nyonya The Tiang Ek, Chen Hiang Niang, Nona Phoa Gin Hian and Tan Poen Bhik Sio Tjia, as well as male translators of Chinese novels such as Lie Sim Djwe. These translators wrote for the booming Malay-language literary market aimed at Peranakan Chinese who had been born in the Indies but still had ties to China; the topic of the works were historical dramas, morality tales, detective stories, cloak-and-dagger or Wuxia.

This first known translation by Lie Loan Lian Nio was of a Chinese novel "The Girl who Picks the Mulberry Leaves" by Wei Shi, a story about ill-fated lovers who end up dying by suicide; the work was popular and controversial in China and was adapted into a film in 1924.

After that she published a handful more works in 1924 and 1925 through a literary magazine published in Pare, Kediri, East Java called Tjerita Baroe (new story). After 1925 nothing else is known about her life or literary output.

== Selected works ==
- Tjhai Siang Lee (Nona toekang petik daon siang). Satoe tjerita jang bener telah kedjadian tempo belon sebrapa lama di Tiongkok (printed by Pek Co in Surabaya in 1921, translation of a Chinese novel "The Girl who Picks the Mulberry Leaves" by Wei Shi)
- Koan Koan. Soeatoe tjerita menoetoerken perdjalanan prempoean kosen, kedjadian di Tiongkok (Printed in Tjerita Baroe in 1924, possibly an abridged translation of Chinese novel "Voluntary Marriage")
- Padang boelan atawa tiada ada perdjodoan lebi baek, satoe tjerita jang bener kedjadian di Shanghai (Printed in Tjerita Baroe in 1924, translation of an unknown Chinese story)
- Tiga prempoean setia, satoe drama kedjadian Tiongkok (Printed in Tjerita Baroe in 1925, translation of an unknown Chinese story)
