= Tjerita Roman =

Chinese Indonesian literary magazine (1929-42)

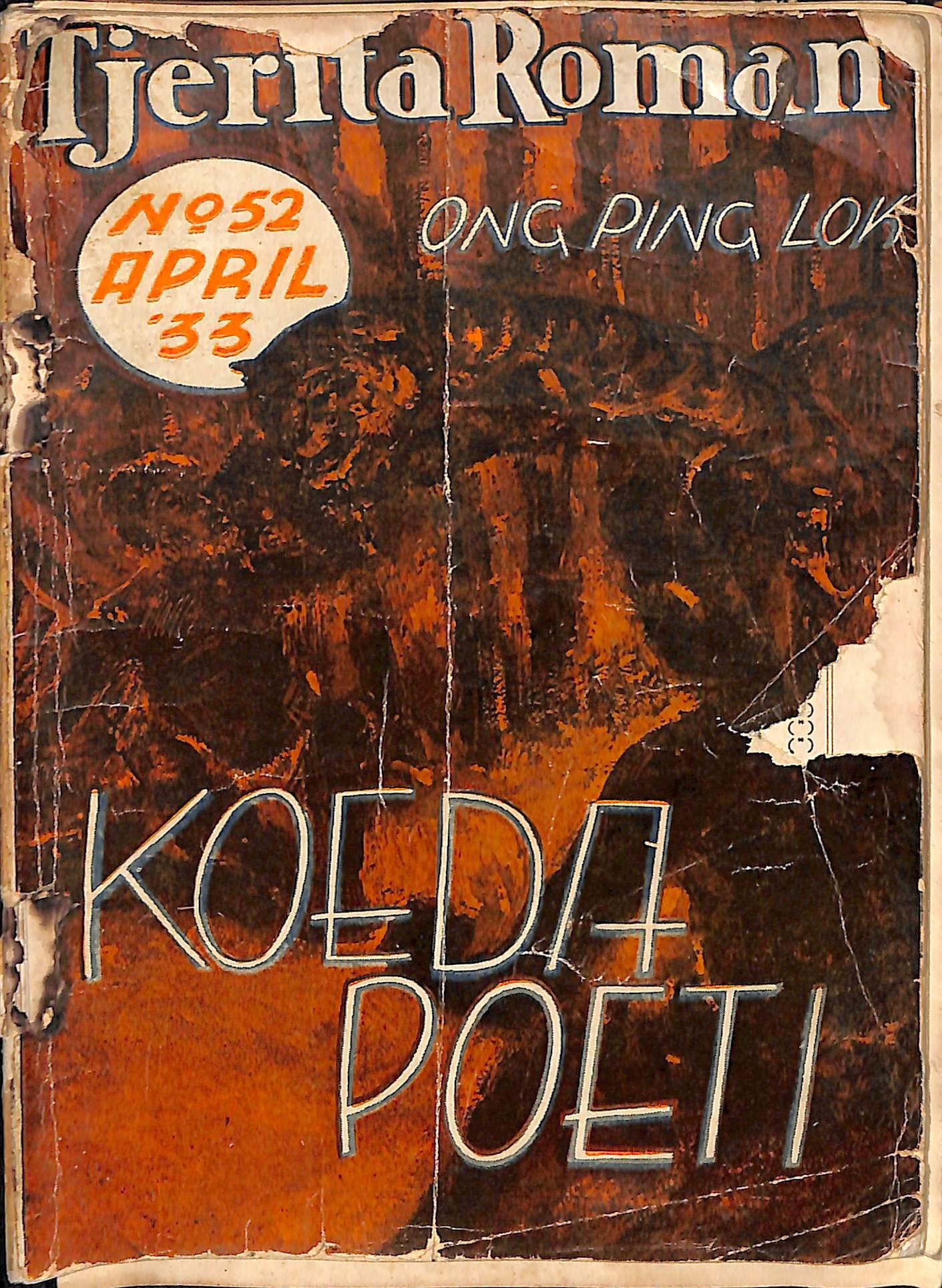
Tjerita Roman April 1933 cover from Indonesian National Library

Tjerita Roman ("novel story" in Malay; Perfected Spelling Cerita Roman) was a monthly Peranakan Chinese, Malay-language literary magazine published in the Dutch East Indies from 1929 to 1942. It was one of the most successful literary publications in the Indies, publishing hundreds of novels, plays, and short stories during its run. Among its authors were many of the notables of the Chinese Indonesian literary world including Njoo Cheong Seng, Pouw Kioe An, Tan Boen Soan, and Liem Khing Hoo.

== History ==
Tjerita Roman was founded in Surabaya, East Java, Dutch East Indies (now Indonesia) in late 1929 by Ong Ping Lok and others from the editorial team behind the successful magazines Penghidoepan and Liberty. At first, it was printed by the firm Hahn & Co. in Surabaya, with capital provided by a businessman named Han Sing Thjiang, who was the owner of Liberty magazine. As in Penghidoepan, each issue usually featured an original or translated novel, sometimes followed by a short play, poem, or story. Ong Ping Lok, who in addition to being an editor wrote fiction under the pen name Monsieur Novel, often printed his pieces in the magazine. The covers were often illustrated by Malang-based artist Tan Liep Poen, who also did most of the covers for Penghidoepan. The magazine quickly rose in popularity to surpass Penghidoepan and Liberty.

The contents of the magazine also reflected shifting tastes among Chinese Indonesian readers; while publications of the 1910s had often consisted of historical martial arts or cloak-and-dagger stories set in China, Tjerita Roman mainly printed stories written and set in the contemporary Dutch East Indies. The magazine also sometimes printed stories or novels by women authors, which was unheard of before the 1920s in the Indies; these included Nyonya The Tiang Ek and The Liep Nio. The magazine is considered to be an important part of the golden age of Peranakan Chinese literature.

At some point, another printing firm, Kwee Sing Tjhiang's Paragon Press in Malang, took over the publication of the magazine from Hahn & Co. Liem Khing Hoo, who published under the pen name Romaro, was also the editor of Tjerita Roman for a time and published many of his novels on its pages. Soe Lie Pit was another novelist who was editor of Tjerita Roman for a time in the mid-1930s.

Later the magazine switched printers once again to Niro-Thaysiang in Surabaya.

The magazine's run ended in 1942 with the Japanese invasion of the Dutch East Indies. It was re-launched in January 1949 as Tjilik Roman's (Romance Youth).

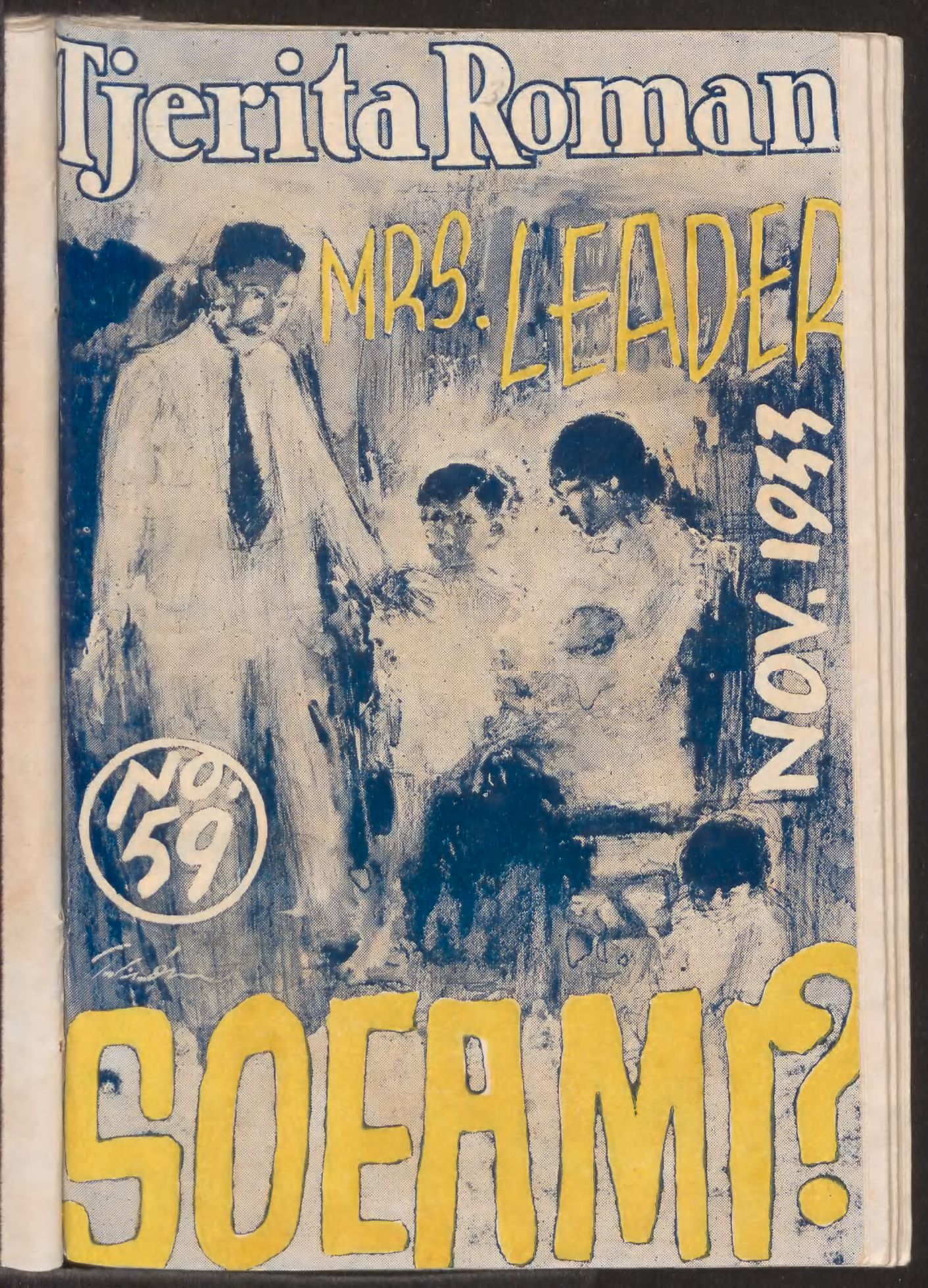
Tjerita Roman No. 59 cover (1933)
