= Khoe Trima Nio =

Chinese indonesian writer and journalist

Khoe Trima Nio (d. 1960s), who published under the pen names Aster and L. S. G., was a Peranakan (Chinese Indonesian) Indonesian language writer and journalist active in the Dutch East Indies during the 1930s. She was part of a small cohort of Chinese Indonesian women novelists and short story writers publishing during that time which included Nyonya The Tiang Ek, Tan Lam Nio and Yang Lioe.

== Biography ==
Her place and time of birth are poorly documented, although she was most likely born in Java around the start of the twentieth century. Her educational background is also unknown; many of her generation of writers had Dutch-language educations.

In 1928, Khoe joined Siem Piet Nio's Indonesian Chinese Women's Association (Indonesian: Persatoean Kaoem Prempoean Tionghoa Indonesia). This group had seven member organizations run by women from various places in Java. The members of the group mainly interacted through the mail, and was also known at times as the Persatoean Journaliste Prampoean (Women Journalists Federation).

According to Claudine Salmon, she worked as a journalist, although no details were given. She is better known for her fictional writings in the 1930s, at a time when Chinese Indonesian and Native Indonesian women's novels and short stories were being printed for the first time. She published in journals such as Liberty and Penghidoepan in the 1930s, often writing under pseudonyms such as Aster or L.S.G. One of these pieces, titled Apa moesti bikin? (What to do?) was published in Penghidoepan in March 1930. Its plot revolved around a single mother who establishes her independence by leaving her community and establishing herself as a dressmaker in another city.

Little is known about what she did from the 1940s onwards. According to Salmon, Khoe died in the 1960s.

== Selected publications ==
- Oh, Itoe tjinta (1930, printed in Penghidoepan)
- Apa moesti bikin? (1930, under the pseudonym Aster, printed in Penghidoepan)
