= Tan Hong Boen =

Chinese Indonesian writer and translator

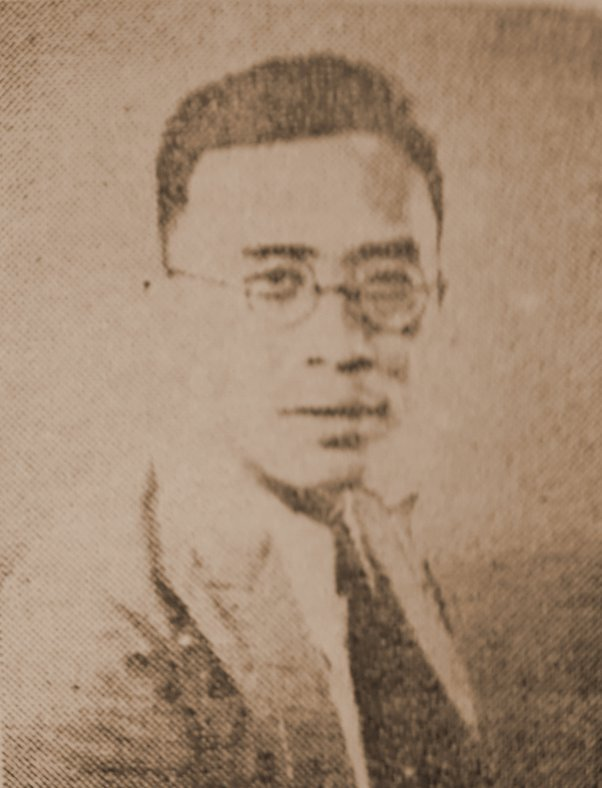
Tan Hong Boen

Tan Hong Boen (Chinese: 陳豐文, 1905–1983), commonly known by his pen name Im Yang Tjoe, was a Chinese Indonesian writer, journalist, and translator active in the Dutch East Indies and Indonesia from the 1920s to the 1950s. He also published occasionally under the pen names Madame D'Eden Lovely for romantic novels, Kihadjar Dharmopralojo for historical novels, and Kihadjar Soekowijono for Wayang stories. In 1933 he published a biography of Sukarno, whom he had shared a jail cell with in 1932; it seems to be the earliest known biography of Sukarno.

== Biography ==
Tan Hong Boen was born on 27 February 1905 in Slawi, Tegal Regency, Central Java, Dutch East Indies. He came from a wealthy family; his father was the owner of a tea plantation. He did not have much formal education, possibly enrolling in a European school for a few years; he wrote in Malay but was also literate in Javanese, Chinese, Dutch, and English.

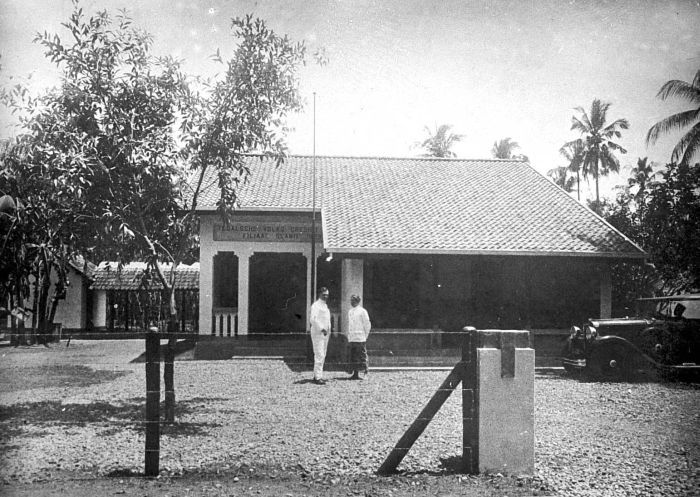
Volksbank branch in Slawi (date unknown)

Because of his interest in the Javanese language and culture, his works of fiction were often adaptations of Javanese stories or settings, although his original works were often set in the Peranakan Chinese community as well. He also traveled around Java and Bali by bicycle to seek inspiration for new stories. He became known for his gift of telling stories in a clever vernacular style, and some of his short stories printed in Sin Po Weekly and other publications won awards. His first novel seems to have been Soepardi dan Soendari, published in 1925 in the literary journal Penghidoepan. After that, he published in other literary journals including Liberty and Boelan Poernama (Full Moon), a magazine he founded and edited from 1929 onwards. He also worked as a journalist and was editor-in-chief at Soemanget in Bandung, a twice-weekly newspaper formerly known as Kiauw Po, starting in 1930.

In 1932 he was arrested and imprisoned after breaking the Indies' strict censorship laws in his journalism and fiction. This ended his time editing both Soemanget and Boelan Poernama (which ceased publication without him). By chance, he was put in the same jail cell in Bandung as Sukarno, the future first president of Indonesia. He interviewed him in prison, and in 1933 published what seems to be the earliest known biography of Sukarno based on what he had learned. He also published a three-volume who's-who of Chinese notables from Java in 1935, a work which contains some priceless information found nowhere else, but is also organized geographically and can be difficult to navigate. Out of the dozens of books he published, this seems to be the only one he printed under his real name and not a pseudonym.

After World War II and Indonesian independence, he continued to publish in literary journals for a few more years; these included Tjilik Roman's, Goedang Tjerita and Tjantik. His stories and novels during this time tended to be less critical of the government and focused more on immoral characters or mystical figures from Javanese folklore. After 1950 he mostly stopped writing novels and turned to writing or adapting stories for Wayang (shadow puppet) performances under the pseudonym Ki Hajar Sukowiyono.

In the postwar era, he created a Jamu-inspired health product called Pil Kita (our pill); he claimed to have thought of the recipe while meditating. It became very successful, especially among long-distance truckers, and is still sold in the 21st century as Pilkita.

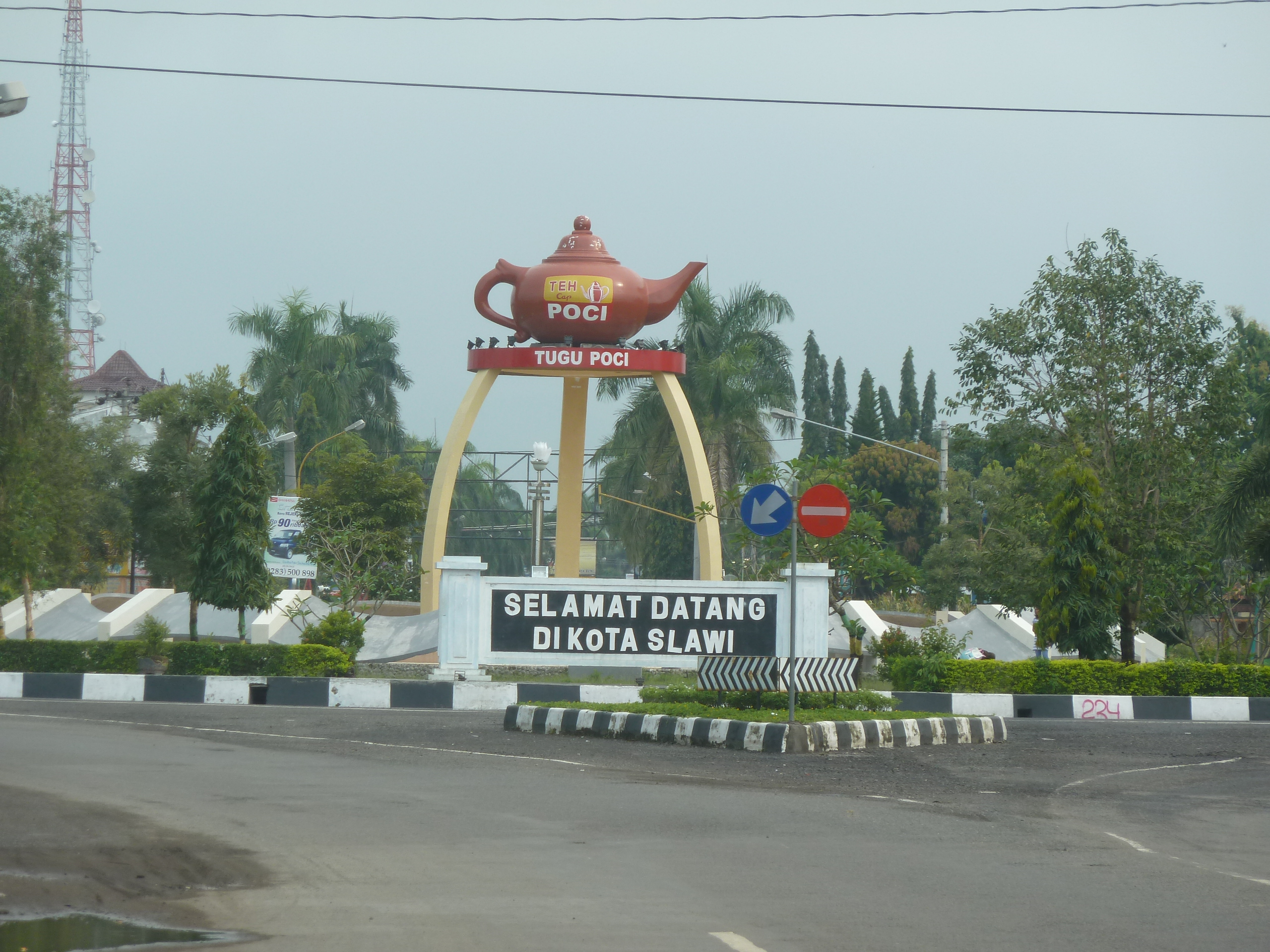
Welcome to Slawi sign

He spent his final years in Slawi, mostly interested in Wayang and running his Pil Kita factory. He died on 15 September 1983 in Slawi.

== Selected works ==
- Soepardi dan Soendari (1925, as Im Yang Tjoe, novel printed in Penghidoepan)
- Oh Harta (1928, as Im Yang Tjoe, novel printed in 2 volumes of Penghidoepan)
- Oh, penghidoepan (1928, as Im Yang Tjoe, novel printed in Penghidoepan, reprinted in Bandung by Soemanget in 1942)
- Itoe Bidadari dari Rawa Pening (1929, as Madame D'Eden Lovely, romance novel printed in Boelan Poernama)
- Koepoe-Koepoe di Dalam Halimoen (1929, as Im Yang Tjoe, satirical novel printed in Boelan Poernama)
- Soerat Resia di Tangkoe-ban-praoe (1930, as Im Yang Tjoe, satirical novel printed in Boelan Poernama)
- Ir. Soekarno sebagi manoesia (1933, biography of Sukarno published by Ravena in Surakarta)
- Orang-orang Tionghoa jang terkemoeka di Java (Who's Who) (1935, biographical lexicon of the Chinese community in Java, printed by The Biographical Publishing Centre in Surakarta)
- Melani - Moetiara dari Djokdjakarta (1949, as Im Yang Tjoe, novel published in Tjilik Roman's)
- Riwajat Ejang Djugom, Panembahan Gunung Kawi (1953, book about a famous Chinese mystic in Java printed by Palma in Surabaya)
