= Handojo Tjandrakusuma =

Indonesian medical researcher and physician (1938-)

- Born: Tjan Dhiam Bo; 20 November 1938 (age 87); Pacitan Regency, Indonesia
- Occupation: Community Base Rehabilitation
- Awards: Sasakawa Health Prize (1992); Ashoka Fellowship (2013)

Academic background
- Education: Airlangga University

Handojo Tjandrakusuma (born Tjan Dhiam Bo, 20 November 1938, Pacitan Regency) is a doctor who devotes himself to the rehabilitation of people with disabilities.

== Early life and education ==
Tjan Dhiam Bo was born on 20 November 1938 in Pacitan Regency, Indonesia. He studied medicine at Airlangga University, Surabaya, graduating in 1966.

As a young doctor, he had a choice: work in a big city or take responsibility and accompany his elderly parents living in Solo at that time. So he decided to go to Solo. To make it easier to find work, he applied to work at Rehabilitation Center (RC) Solo. Suharso did build RC after the independence war, after seeing the many victims with disabilities that needed to be treated. The basis for Tjandrakusuma’s choice is simple because not many doctors are interested in this field.

In 1968, Tjandrakusuma was sent to study in Lebanon for six months. He studied with several doctors from other countries, who were sent by World Health Organization. Lebanon was chosen because many war victims need skills training to overcome their disabilities.

== Handling disabled people ==
At RC, Tjandrakusuma worked under Soeharso, director of the rehabilitation centre. Gradually he became more interested in the ministry, and eventually fell in love with working at RC and the Foundation for People with Disabilities (YPAC). After three months serving at RC, Tjandrakusuma finally decided to close his private practice in the afternoon. However, the practice is quite in demand. Every day no less than 30 patients come for treatment. Tjandrakusuma closed his practice after he consulted with his wife. Now his life completely depends on the salary of civil servants. His mother and close friends thought Tjandrakusuma was a bit crazy.

Several months after closing the practice, his son became seriously ill and had to be hospitalized. After recovering, it turned out that he did not have enough money to pay off the hospital fees. He was forced to borrow money from his mother.

== Developing community-based services ==
While working at the Cerebral Palsy (CP) clinic in Solo, Tjandrakusuma observed where the patients came from. It turns out that among them, there are also sufferers who come from remote villages. RC services do not reach them because they are poor and cannot afford to go to the city for treatment. Because of that, Tjandrakusuma involved the community to become his accomplices. He provides simple exercises, looks for sufferers, and provides basic assistance until their quality of life improves.

For this effort, Tjandrakusuma utilized existing personnel in the villages, such as midwives and family planning officers. The results are very positive, as the officers now have more value, and their free time in the village can be better utilized. All of this greatly reduces the cost of health care for the less fortunate.

Based on this experience, Tjandrakusuma founded an institution called Community Base Rehabilitation (CBR) Development and Training Center (DTC) in Colomadu, Solo. Practitioners and researchers from various countries have visited the centre to study its approach.

Apart from his activities at this rehabilitation center, Tjandrakusuma is also active as Chairperson of the Kosala Panti Health Foundation in Solo.

== International awards ==
What Tjandrakusuma did for the community was noticed by the international community. In 1992, he received the Sasakawa Health Prize from World Health Organization for managing a local community-based disability rehabilitation effort. He also received a similar award from the University of Alberta, Canada. He was awarded the Ashoka Fellowship in 2013.
