= Tio Tjay =

Indonesian painter (born 1946)

Tio Tjay (born 1946 as Tio Hok Tjay) is an Indonesian painter. He lives in Brazil.

== Biography ==
Tio Tjay was born in 1946 in Jakarta. At a young age, Tio Tjay enjoyed studying Chinese painting and calligraphy.

In 1967 he immigrated to South America with his family. He held exhibitions in many cities, including São Paulo, Rio de Janeiro, Brasília and Paraguay. From 1971 to 1975, he lived in Manaus, which gave him an opportunity to enter the Amazon rainforest, which inspired him to paint about nature. In 1976, he moved back to São Paulo and took part in the São Paulo Art Biennial.

In the 1980s he was invited to take part in an exhibition in Naples, to mark the cultural relationship between Brazil and Italy. A few years later, he was invited to Fukuyama, Japan, for a collective exhibition. He then returned to Indonesia and worked in his birth country.

Tjay's painting is influenced by the Latin colours that were dominant in Brazil. In Indonesia, his art combined the Latin colours with an oriental style.
