= Abdullah Mokoginta =

Indonesian politician (1935–2021)

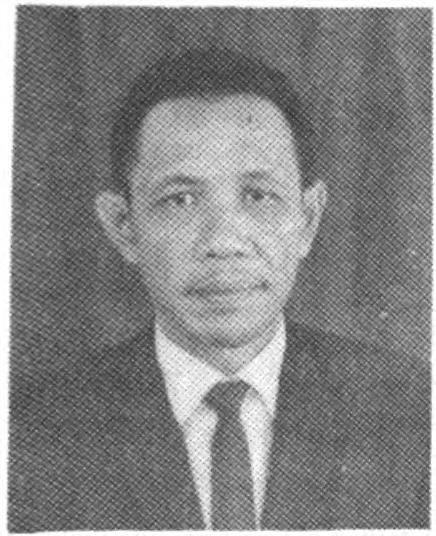

Member of the People's Representative Council
- In office 1 October 1992 – 1 October 1999

Deputy Governor of North Sulawesi
- In office 20 January 1986 – 23 October 1991
- Preceded by: position established
- Succeeded by: Achmad Nadjamuddin

Personal details
- Born: 5 May 1935; Bilalang, North Sulawesi, Sulawesi, Indonesia
- Died: 16 August 2021 (aged 86); Kotamobagu, Indonesia
- Political party: Golkar

Abdullah Mokoginta (5 May 1935 – 16 August 2021) was an Indonesian politician. A member of Golkar, he served as Deputy Governor of North Sulawesi from 1986 to 1991 and in the People's Representative Council from 1992 to 1999.

Mokoginta was sworn in as the first Deputy Governor of North Sulawesi on 20 January 1986. On 23 October 1991, he was succeeded by Achmad Nadjamuddin. Following his term, he was elected to serve in the People's Representative Council in 1992. He was re-elected in 1997 and served until 1999. In the middle of his term, he was nominated to serve as Governor of North Sulawesi, but was defeated in the election by E.E. Mangindaan.

Abdullah Mokoginta died in Kotamobagu on 16 August 2021 at the age of 86.
