= Kang Cing Wie =

12th-century Chinese woman

Kang Cing Wie was a 12th-century Chinese woman who married the Balinese king Jayapangus. Her father was a merchant.

She is remembered as the Goddess of Prosperity in traditional Balinese culture.
