= Tan Liep Poen =

- 陳立本
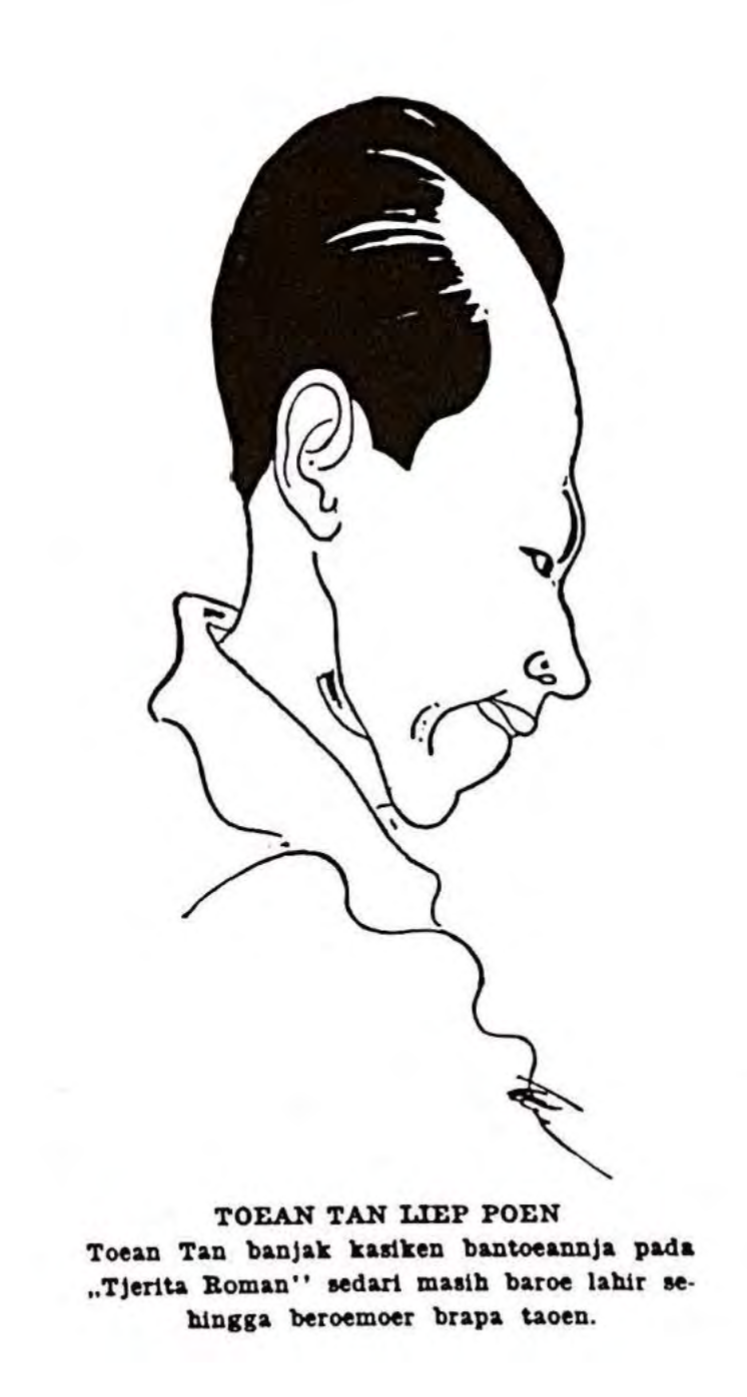
- A caricature of Tan Liep Poen, date unknown.
- Born: 20 August 1906; Malang
- Died: unknown
- Known for: illustrations in Chinese Indonesian literary magazines

Tan Liep Poen (Chinese: 陳立本, b. 1906), also known by the Indonesian name Atmadi Asa, was a prolific Peranakan Chinese painter, writer, magazine editor, and playwright active in Malang, East Java from the 1920s to the 1970s.

== Biography ==
Tan Liep Poen was born in Malang, Dutch East Indies (now Indonesia) on 20 August 1906. In the 1920s, he studied art by correspondence with Federal Schools, Inc., based in Minneapolis; he received a certificate in 1928. Early in his career he worked as a lithographer. He completed a second correspondence program with the ABC School of Design in Paris in 1936.

In 1933 he started working as a designer for the A. de la Mar advertising agency, a role he held until the Japanese invasion of the Dutch East Indies in 1942. During the 1930s he also became a prolific illustrator for Chinese Indonesian literary magazines, including Penghidoepan, Tjerita Roman, Tjantik, Tjilik's Romans, Liberty, Hoa Kiao and Fu Len. He also wrote literary criticism and articles about classical Chinese art for the newspaper Sin Po. During the 1940s he also had a number of award-winning expositions of his paintings, including in Surabaya in 1940, Jakarta in 1941 and 1943, Bandung in 1944, and in Malang in 1951.

In 1945 he joined the theatre troupe Pantjawarna, led by Njoo Cheong Seng and Djamaluddin Malik, working for them as a scene painter. He also started writing his own short stories and plays during this era. He became the associate editor of the Malang-based literary magazine Liberty in 1946.

His play Tas plastik (plastic bag) was performed on the radio in 1950, while Tjarang emas (golden branch) was staged in Malang in 1952. He became a prolific writer for magazines from the 1950s through the 1970s, including for Liberal from Surabaya, Dewata from Jakarta, and in Liberty.

He continued to live in Malang into the 21st century. His exact date of death is not publicly known.
