= Tjan Tjoe Som =

Indonesian professor and translator

Tjan Tjoe Som (Chinese: 曾珠森, 1903–1969) was an Indonesian Chinese intellectual and sinologist at the University of Indonesia.

== Early life ==
Tjan was the son of a prominent Muslim Chinese family in Surakarta, Dutch East Indies. His first education was in the local HCS (Dutch-Chinese School) and then in the AMS (General Middle School) in Yogyakarta.

His brother Tjan Tjoe Siem also became an academic (of Javanese literature).

== Academic career ==
In 1935 he went to the Netherlands to study Sinology at Leiden University. He obtained a PhD in Sinology in 1949 and was appointed as a professor there. In 1952 he returned to Indonesia and became head of the department of Sinology at the FSUI (Fakultas Sastra Universitas Indonesia - Literature Department at the University of Indonesia).

== Political activities ==
In the late 1950s he became associated with left-wing politics at a high level. In 1958 he joined the Himpunan Sardjana Indonesia (Indonesian: Indonesian Scholars' Association), a mass organization affiliated with the Communist Party of Indonesia (PKI). He was appointed as director of the Universitas Rakjat (Indonesian: People's university), a PKI educational network. He was also an advisor for the Chinese language edition of Warta Bhakti, a major left-wing newspaper in Indonesia at that time.

He died in Bandung in February 1969.

== Selected works ==
- Po-hu-t'ung = The comprehensive discussions in the White Tiger Hall: a contribution to the history of classical studies in the Han period (Volume 1, 1949; Volume 2, 1952), Leiden: E.J. Brill
- De plaats van de studie der kanonieke boeken in de Chinese filosofie: rede uitgesproken bij de aanvaarding van het ambt van bijzonder hoogleraar aan de Rijksuniversiteit te Leiden op 27 October 1950 (1950), Leiden E.J. Brill
- Eastern and Western World (1953)
- Tugas ilmu pengetahuan (1959)
