= Nyonya Meneer =

Indonesian businesswoman (1895–1978)

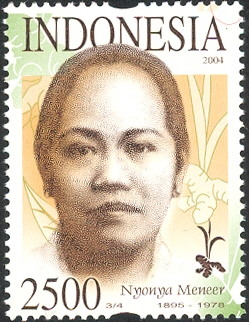
- Born: Lauw Ping Nio; 1895; Sidoarjo, East Java, Dutch East Indies
- Died: 1978 (aged 82–83); Semarang, Central Java, Indonesia
- Occupation: Businesswoman
- Known for: Herbal medicine developer

Lauw Ping Nio (1895–1978), better known by her alias Nyonya Meneer, was an Indonesian businesswoman in the herbal medicine industry.

== Early life ==
Lauw Ping Nio was born in 1895 in Sidoarjo, East Java, Dutch East Indies, and was of Chinese descent. She was the third of five children. She became known by the alias Nyonya Meneer (Mrs Meneer) - a name taken from the Dutch word for groat rice.

Meneer was married at the age of 16 to merchant Ong Bian Wan. When Meneer was pregnant with her four children, her mother visited her daily with jamu, a traditional herbal drink. She also treated her husband with herbal medicines when he was unwell with stomach complaints.

== Career ==
After Meneer moved to Semarang, she began making jamu for friends and neighbours from her mother's recipes. This lead her to setting up a small at home business in her kitchen called "Jamu Cap Potret Nyonya Meneer." Meneer's business grew in popularity and in 1919 she opened a small factory and a herbal medicine shop. The company became one of Indonesia's most trusted traditional medicine brands.

By 1940, Meneer's daughter had expanded the business to Jakarta. In 2000, her grandson Charles Saerang assumed control of the company after internal conflict between Meneer's children and grandchildren. In 2005, the business expanded to international exports into foreign markets. Meneer's face was included on the packaging of all the products as a symbol that she herself came to the customers with the product. Her image remained on the packaging until 2017, when the company went bankrupt.

== Death ==
Meneer died in 1978 in Semarang, Central Java, Indonesia.

== Legacy ==
The Nyonya Meneer Herbal Medicine Museum was founded in 1984 in Semarang. It displays herbs and the tools used in the production of traditional medicines.
