= The Liep Nio =

Chinese Indonesian woman writer

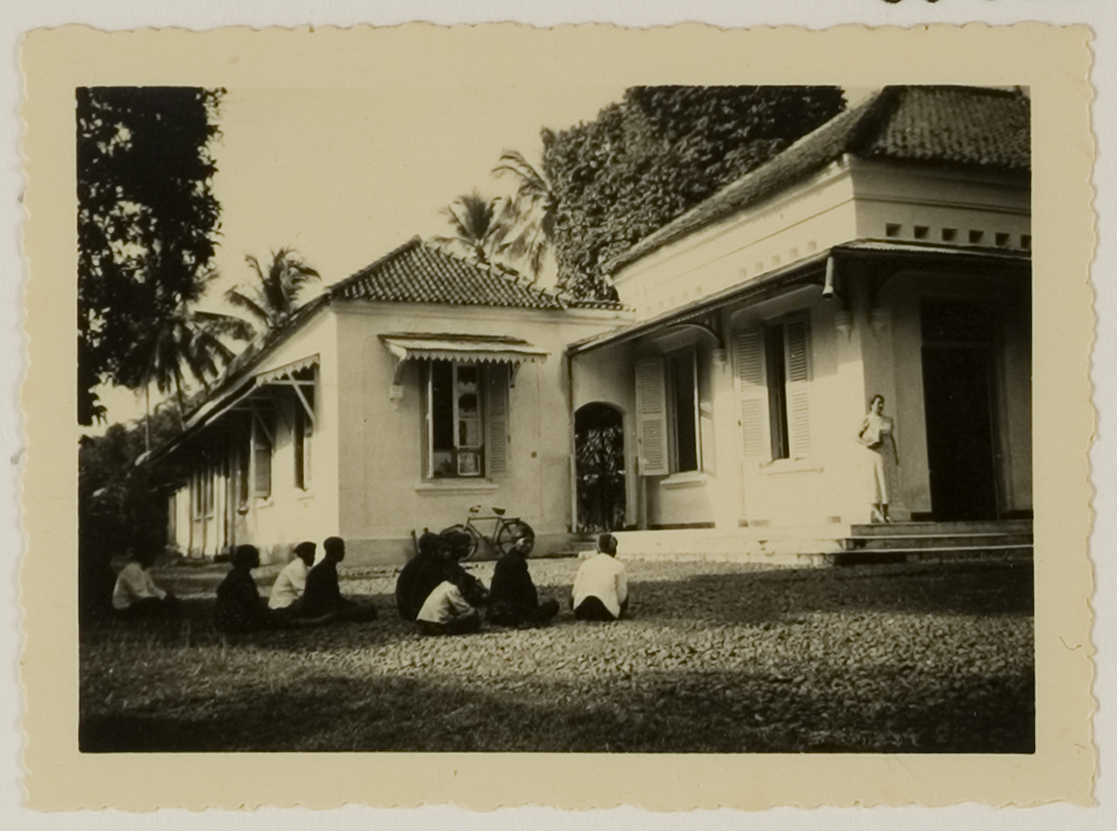
A government building in Purbalingga, Central Java, 1930s

The Liep Nio was a Chinese Indonesian writer and playwright active in the 1930s in the Dutch East Indies. Little is known about her life aside from the fact that she was a Peranakan Chinese woman from Purbalingga in Central Java; she was probably born in the early twentieth century. She was part of the first generation of Indonesian women who to appear in print, which was almost unheard of before the 1930s; the first short writings by Native Indonesian and Indonesian Chinese women are thought to have appeared in newspapers in the 1910s and 1920s, but few were published in book form until the 1930s. The Liep Nio published poems, novels, plays, and short stories in literary magazines such as Tjerita Roman, Liberty, and Djawa Tengah Review.

Her best known work is her 1931 novel Siksa'an Allah (God's torment), which appeared in the Surabaya literary journal Tjerita Roman. The novel was a moralistic story about a Peranakan couple who married without the approval of their parents, which caused their downfall. In the novel, the husband Siok Tjwan, son of a contractor, marries Liang Nio, daughter of a rich merchant from Kediri. They move to Surakarta and then to Surabaya and are unable to make any connections in Chinese business communities and Liang Nio supports them by baking cakes and sewing. Eventually Siok Tjawn sells Liang Nio to a rich merchant who mistreats her; their daughter Liesje becomes a sex worker and outcast from polite society. The novel could be interpreted as a critique of the rigidity of the colonial Chinese society which gave no place for children born out of wedlock or for people who choose their own path in life; however, it is essentially written in the format of male Chinese novelists who warned of the fate of fallen women.

In the late 1930s, she published poetry in Liberty; at that time she was apparently living in Tasikmalaya, West Java.

== Selected publications ==
- Tjerdik membawa kaberoentoengan (1931, short story printed in Liberty)
- Siksa'an Allah (1931, novel printed in Tjerita Roman)
- Kolot contra Modern atawa salah mengerti, tooneelstuk dlm I bedrijft (1934, a play serialized in Djawa Tengah Review)
