= Hoo Eng Djie =

Indonesian songwriter

- 何榮日
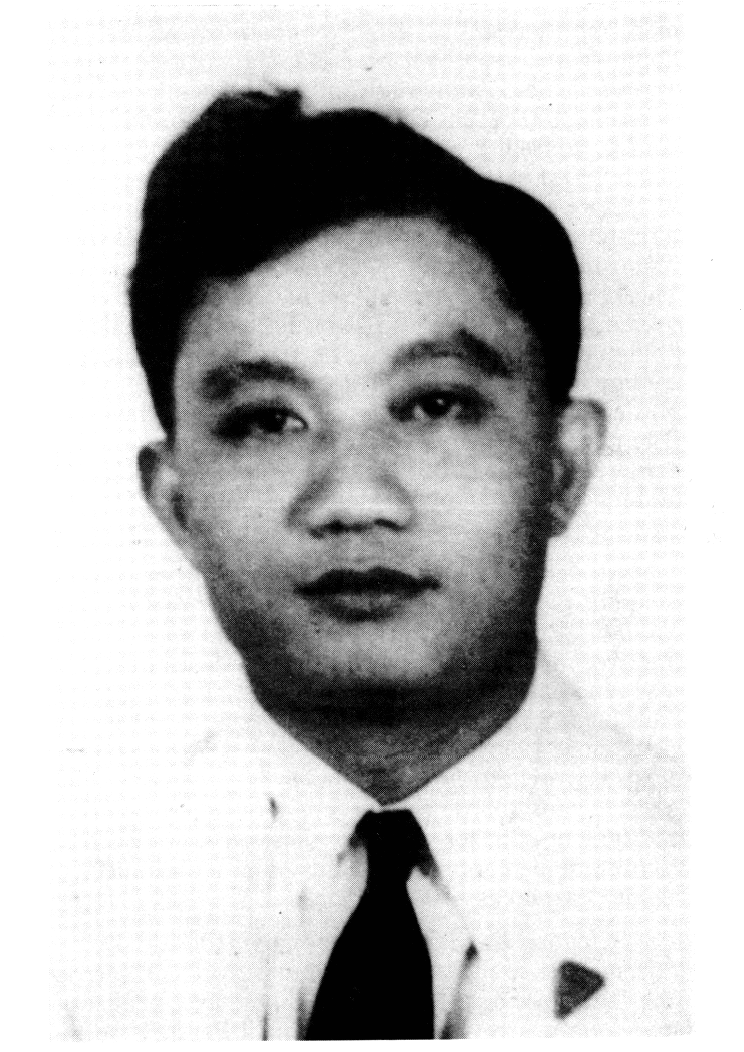
- Born: c. 1907; Makassar
- Died: 7 March 1960; Makassar
- Other name: Baba Tjoi
- Occupations: poet, songwriter, singer
- Years active: c. 1920–1960

Hoo Eng Djie (c. 1906–1960, Pe̍h-ōe-jī: Hô Êng-ji̍t), known popularly as Baba Tjoi, was a Peranakan Chinese writer, singer, songwriter and recording artist from the Dutch East Indies. He was a multilingual artist; in addition to Malay, he could speak Makassarese fluently. He composed thousands of songs from the 1920s to the 1950s, notably in the popular Kroncong style and local Makassar styles, and was given official recognition by President Sukarno in 1953.

His life has been portrayed in works of art at various times, including a 1950 biography by Njoo Cheong Seng as well as a 2019 film Ati Raja.

== Biography ==
Hoo Eng Djie was born in 1906 or 1907 in Kassi Kebo, the Chinese quarter of Maros, Celebes and Dependencies Residency, Dutch East Indies (today located in South Sulawesi, Indonesia). His mother Liem Tien Nio was a Peranakan said to have been descended from Liem Tjien Liong, a historical Kapitan Cina in Makassar. Hoo's grandfather Hoo Tjay had emigrated from Fujian, China to Maros, whereas his father Hoo Kie Seng was a glass dealer there. The family were not wealthy. He enrolled for a few years in a Malay school in Makassar, where he was instructed in the Malay, Bugis and Makassar languages (but not Chinese). He was forced to withdraw when his family's finances worsened; at age 13 he got a job on a shop which sailed between the islands in the Eastern Indies (to Ambon Island, Buton, and so on). When he lost that job, he returned to Makassar and worked in his father's shop.

As a youth, Hoo was attracted by the theatre, and then became fascinated by composing songs in the traditional structure of Makassar music. By age seventeen he was already known for his performances of philosophical poems as well as songs accompanied in the traditional style by a lute or violin. He began to compose many songs, often adapting old Chinese melodies with newly composed lyrics tailored to the local Peranakan audience. Hoo also become interested in politics in the mid-1920s, and was briefly arrested by the Dutch in 1926 for involvement in the anti-colonial movement. In 1927, when Indonesian nationalism and youth groups were being founded all everywhere, he cofounded one called Sien Nien Thoan (youth association), with himself as propagandist. Due to the communal nature of politics in Makassar at that time, he was eventually forbidden by the Dutch to speak about religion in public, and was often arrested and interrogated over the content of his songs.

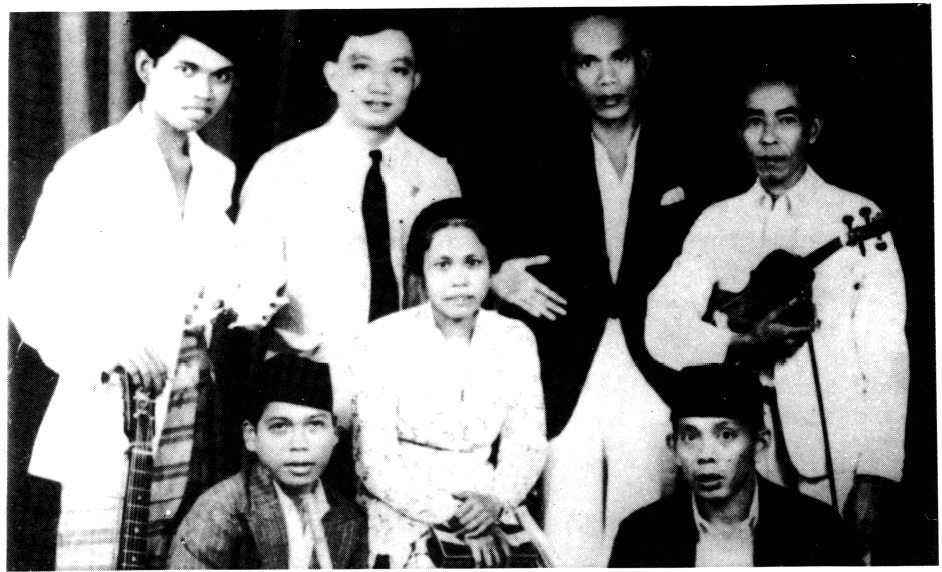
Songwriter Hoo Eng Djie and traditional music orchestra, sometime before 1941.

In 1938 Hoo became director of a new orchestra called Sinar Sedjati (ray of truth). The group attracted the attention of Canary Records from Surabaya, and between 1938 and 1940 they went on to record Phonograph records which sold in the tens of thousands and helped popularize music from Sulawesi in Java and elsewhere. Shortly before the Japanese invasion he also founded a theatre troupe with Lie Seng Gie, called Sinar Matahari (ray of the sun). At around this time he married a woman named Soan Kie. Upon the Japanese invasion his theatre troupe ceased operating and Hoo went into hiding in the mountains with his family.

After the end of World War II, he resumed his music career and founded a new musical group called and Singara Kullu-Kulluwa, which expanded the previously rudimentary instrumentation of his prewar groups with accordions, contrabasses, and guitars and attracted celebrity singers. He also worked as a music teacher and continued to compose new pieces. He also began to perform regularly on the newly established Radio Republik Indonesia Makassar. In 1947 he met the writer and film director Njoo Cheong Seng, who was very impressed with him and gave him bit parts in some of his films.

In August 1953, President Sukarno visited Makassar and had an official visit with Hoo and some of his artist colleagues. The main topic of their discussion was regional art forms (Indonesian: Kesenian Daerah). Sukarno invited Hoo and his colleague Kang Eng Hong to travel to Jakarta for an audience with him in the presidential palace. They discussed politics, Chinese Indonesian integration and poems and songs from Sulawesi, followed by a recital of some of his compositions. Sukarno granted him the official title of Doktor Bahasa Bugis-Makassar (Doctor of the Bugis-Makassar language). At around this time he also won the Indonesian National Radio award for his songwriting.

Upon his return to Makassar, he refounded the orchestra as Sawerigading (the name of a hero from a Bugis epic) and continued to compose poems and songs quite prolifically until his death. By the end of his life, he was estimated to have composed around 3000 songs, most in the Makassar kelong style. Hoo Eng Djie died on 7 March in either 1960 or 1962 in Makassar (historians disagree on the year).

== Legacy ==
Due to his prolific output of songs, some of Hoo Eng Djie's works are still performed today, especially by traditional music and Kroncong groups from Makassar. His best known song, Ati Raja, was taught in Indonesian music schools in the early Independence ere and was adapted more recently into a longer work by pianist Ananda Sukarlan (Rapsodia Nusantara no. 40).

Njoo Cheong Seng, who met Hoo during his time in Makassar in the late 1940s and cast him in a few films, wrote a biography of him in 1950 titled Manusia Sampurna jang tidak Sampurna (perfect people who aren't perfect). There was also a 2019 biopic about him, directed by Shaifuddin Bahrum, titled Ati Raja.
