= Low Tuck Kwong =

Indonesian businessman

- Born: 17 April 1948 (age 78); Colony of Singapore
- Occupations: Founder and president director of Bayan Resources

Low Tuck Kwong (born 17 April 1948) is an Indonesian billionaire businessman who is the founder and president director of Bayan Resources, a coal mining company in Indonesia. Low worked at his father's construction company in Singapore as a teenager and then moved to Indonesia in 1972 for greater opportunities. He is ranked as the third-richest person in Indonesia and 66th richest person in the world by Forbes magazine, with a net worth of US$27 billion as of 2024.

Low bought his first coal-mine concession in Kalimantan (the Indonesian side of Borneo) in the 1990s. In 2024, Bayan reported producing 56.9 million tons of coal, nearly 7% of the country's total production of 832 million tons.

In 2023, the Low Tuck Kwong Foundation gave S$127.6 million to educational and healthcare causes, and was the largest private giver of all Singapore's philanthropic organisations.

In August 2024 Low transferred a stake in Bayan, worth $6.6 billion at the time, to his daughter Elaine.
