= Tan Tjeng Nio =

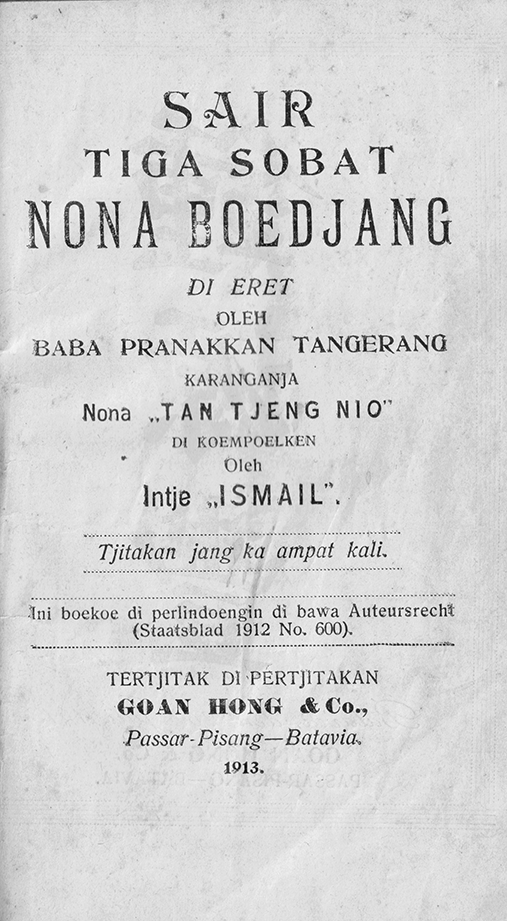
Cover of the 1913 edition of Sair Tiga Sobat Nona Boedjang by Tan Tjeng Nio.

Nona Tan Tjeng Nio was a Peranakan (Chinese Indonesian) Malay language poet active in the 1890s. She was one of the earliest known Chinese Indonesian women writers to be published in the Indies; her poems are considered to have surprisingly modern themes and ideas for their time.

== Biography ==
Little is known about Tan Tjeng Nio's early life or educational background.

In the 1897 a book of her poetry, written in the Syair form, was printed by Albrecht & Co. in Batavia. It was titled Boekoe sair tiga sobat nona boedjang dieret oleh baba peranakan Tangerang, sahingga sampe djadi abis-abisan, di koempoelken oleh Intje Ismail (Poem about three women friends, one of whom was seduced by a Peranakan man from Tangerang until she was bankrupt, compiled by Intje Ismail). In the poems, the female protagonists (named A, B, and C) come to realize that it as better to have control of their own lives even if they lived in poverty, and that celibacy may be preferable to marriage. More broadly, it served as a warning to young Chinese women to think twice about marrying men who went through the motions of romantic love in order to trick naïve women out of their money; the contemporary advertisement by the publisher marketed it as such and praised its "good Malay". The poems also display many forms of physical intimacy between the three female protagonists, as well as a level of independence from their parents that is quite different from other Indonesian Chinese literature of the era.

Elizabeth Chandra speculates that Tan may either have had a European (or European-style) education, since she dealt with modern topics, or conversely she may have been illiterate since her poems were compiled by someone else. The compiler, Intje Ismail, was a journalist who published in the Malay Chinese press at around that time; Claudine Salmon speculates based on his name that he may have been a Peranakan Chinese convert to Islam. The book of poetry proved popular; it was reprinted at least seven times in Batavia, with the latest known edition coming out in 1925.
