= Nyonya The Tiang Ek =

Chinese Indonesian journalist and translator

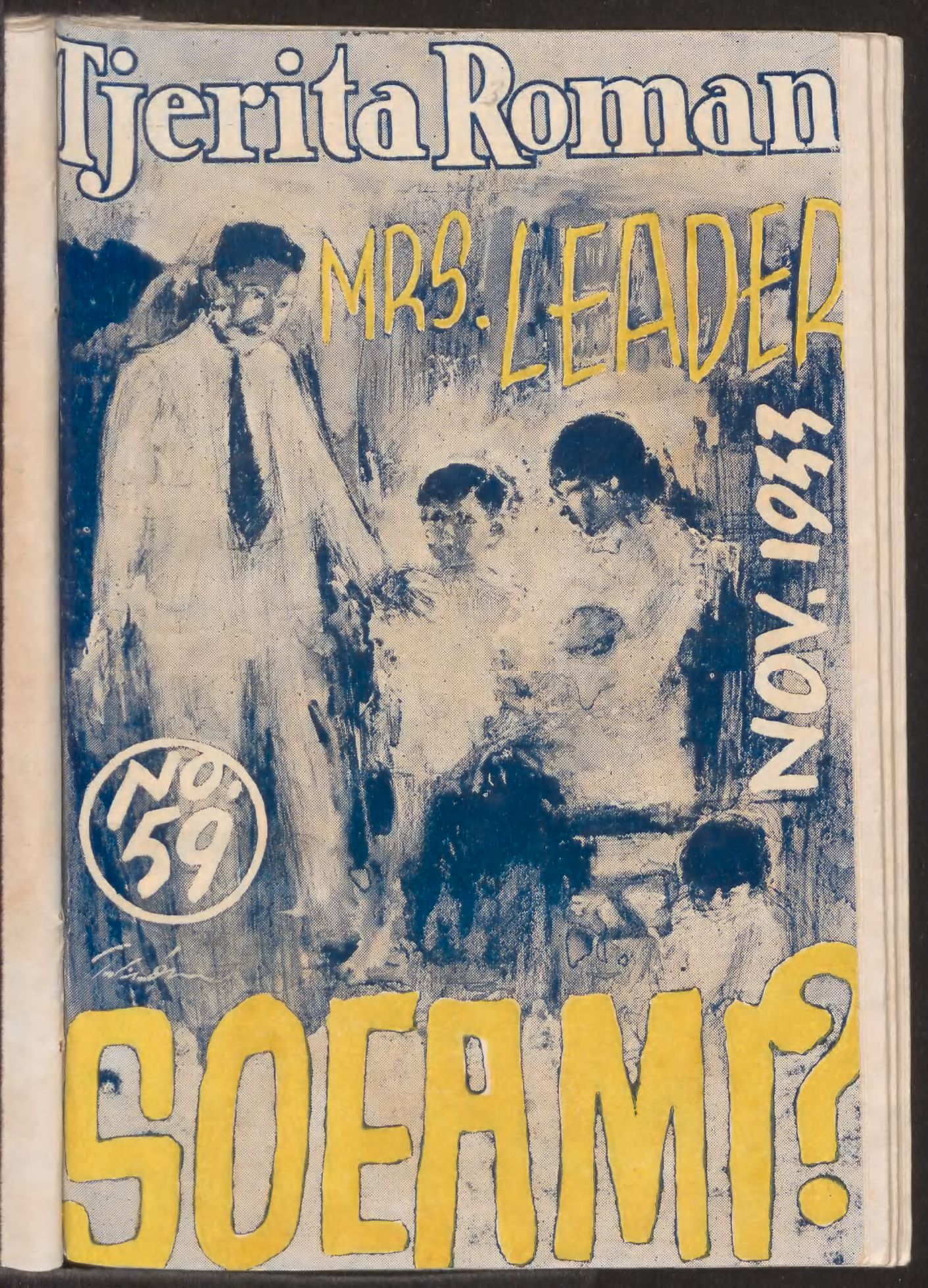
Tjerita Roman issue No. 59 cover (1933)

Nyonya The Tiang Ek, whose real name was Lie Djien Nio, was a Chinese Indonesian journalist, writer, and translator who was active in the late colonial period in the Dutch East Indies. She was part of a small cohort of Chinese Indonesian women novelists and short story writers publishing during that time which included Khoe Trima Nio, Tan Lam Nio, and Yang Lioe, and translators such as Lie Loan Lian Nio. She was known for translating detective and cloak-and-dagger stories and was interested in women's liberation and increased freedom for Chinese Indonesian women in particular. She was one of only a handful of documented Chinese Indonesian women translators in the Indies.

== Biography ==
Lie Djien Nio was born in Cianjur, West Java, Dutch East Indies (now Indonesia) at around the turn of the twentieth century. Her father, Lie Swi Gwan, was a translator of Chinese novels into Malay.

She became editor of a monthly magazine named Ho Pao which was published by an association named Lien Ho Hui. She regularly published short stories and articles dealing with women's situations and problems in this and other publications including Sin Bin, Panorama, and Liberty, occasionally using the Pen name Mrs. Leader, or Njonja The Tiang Ek which was her husband's name with Nyonya (Mrs.) added. Her translations appeared in the 1920s in such literary magazines as Penghidoepan, Tjerita Roman, and Tjerita Pilian. She also translated at least a handful of detective cloak-and-dagger novels from Chinese into Malay. Her original 1925 novel Terboeroe napsoe ("To be haunted by one's passions") described two Chinese sisters who had received Dutch educations in the Indies and become writers and whose lives had taken different paths. Another of her short stories concerned the life of Chinese people in the United States. Her 1933 novel Soeami? depicted the life of a female journalist who was neglected and abandoned by her husband.

The date and circumstances of her death are unknown.

== Selected publications ==
- Lie Eng Hwee, nasibnja satoe anak kembar, Tjerita Pilian (serialized 1924–5, translation of a Chinese Cloak and dagger novel)
- Huang Jing Hoa: Tjerita Politie Rahasia, (1925, translation of a detective novel serialized in Penghidoepan)
- Terboeroe napsoe, (1925, serialized in Penghidoepan))
- Soeami? Tjerita Roman (1933, published as Mrs. Leader)

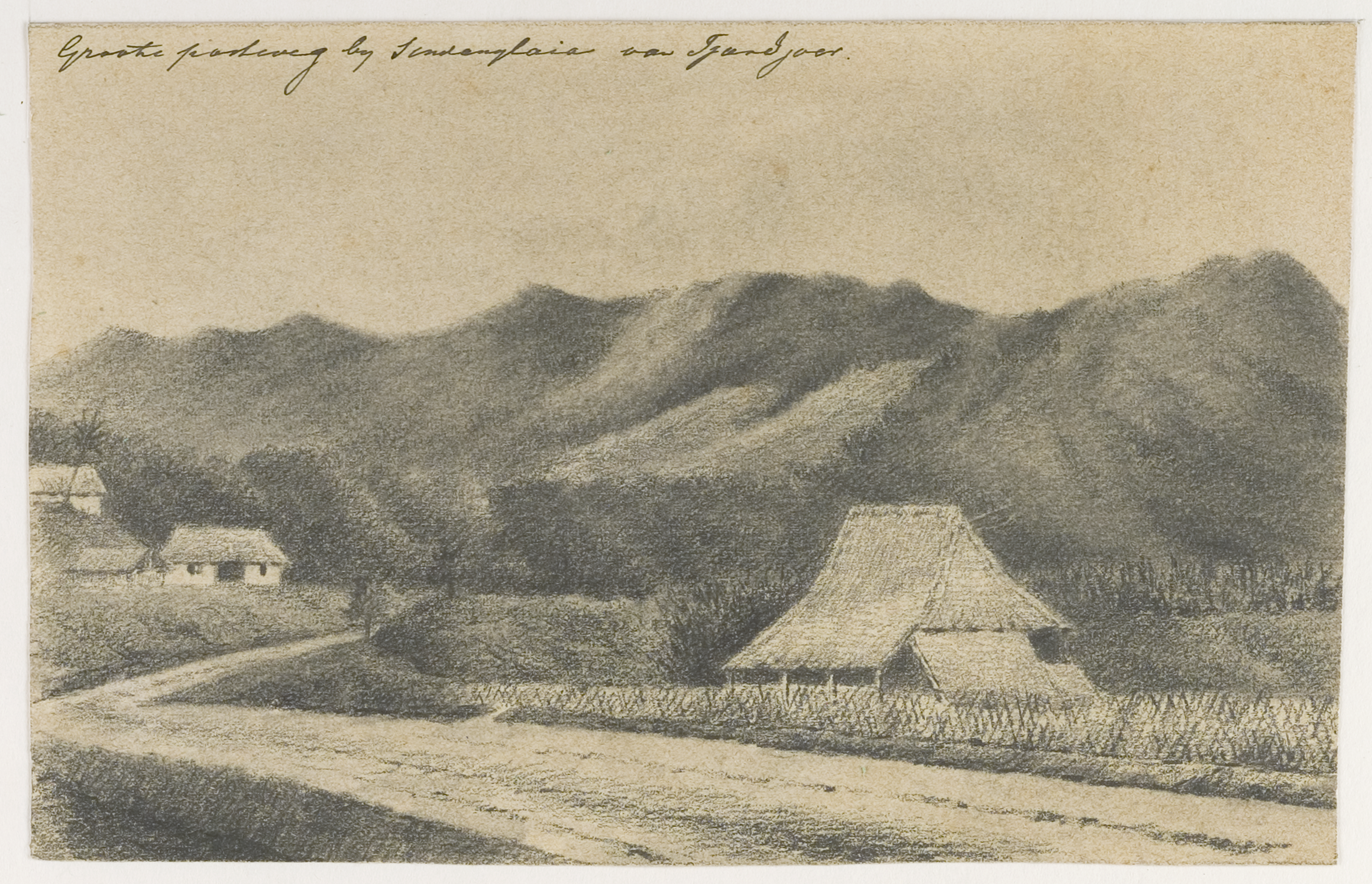
Groote Postweg near Cianjur, 1880s
