= Penghidoepan =

Dutch East Indies literary magazine (1925–42)

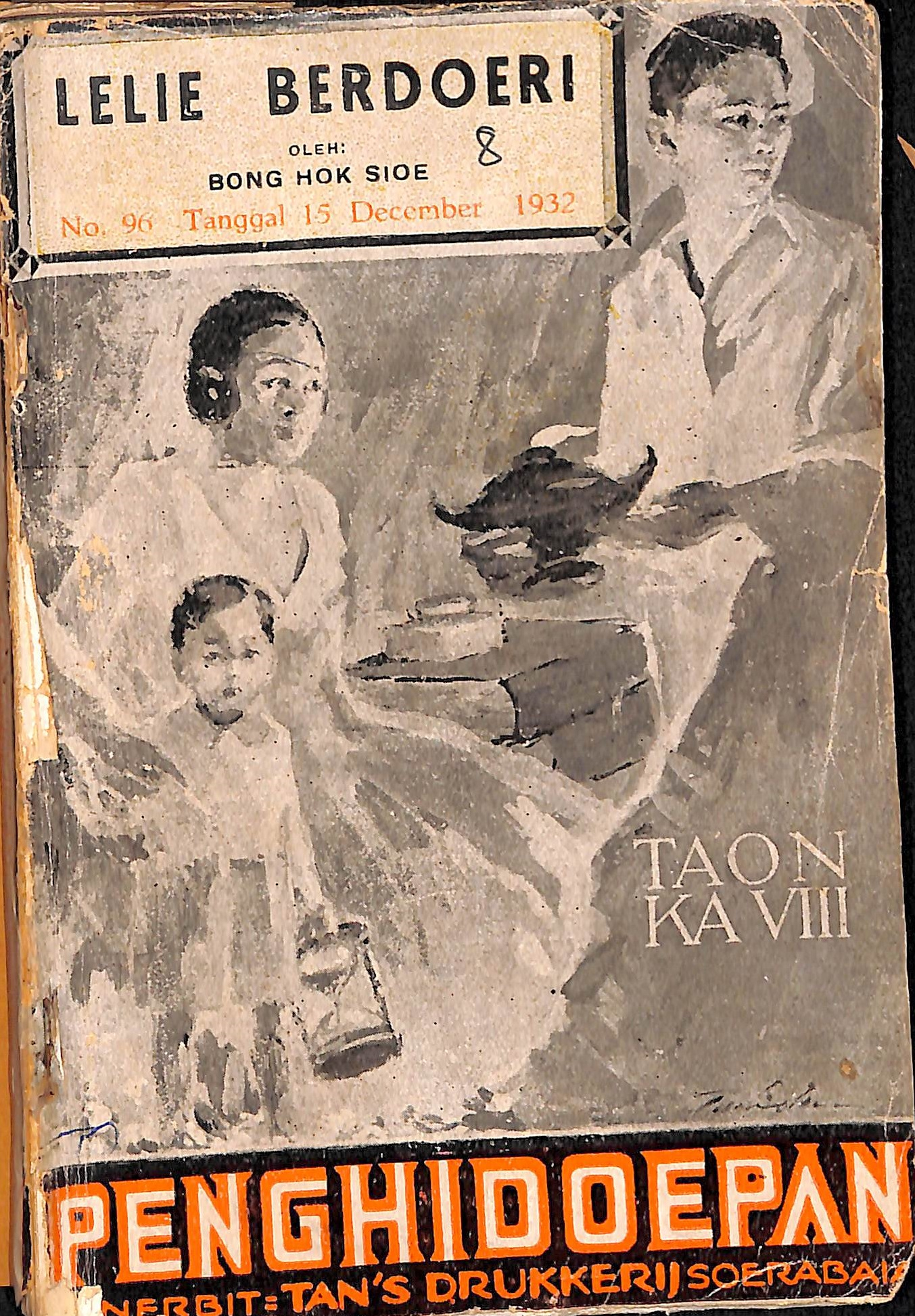
Cover of Penghidoepan, December 1932

Penghidoepan (meaning "life" in Malay; Perfected Spelling Penghidupan) was a monthly Peranakan Chinese, Malay-language literary magazine published in the Dutch East Indies from 1925 to 1942. It was one of the most successful literary publications in the Indies, publishing more than 200 novels and short stories during its run. Among its authors were many of the notables of the Chinese Indonesian literary world including Njoo Cheong Seng, Tan Hong Boen, and Tan Boen Soan.

== History ==
Penghidoepan was founded in Surabaya, East Java, Dutch East Indies (now Indonesia) by Njoo Cheong Seng, Ong Ping Lok, and Liem Khing Hoo, the editorial team behind the bimonthly magazine Hoa Kiao and was printed by the Tan printing company (Dutch: Tan's Drukkerij). Njoo Cheong Seng, who was already a major writer, playwright, and filmmaker, became its first editor. The magazine was intended to be a new platform to publish original novels and short stories, as well as translations of Chinese and Western novels; Njoo Cheong Seng wrote many of the novels himself as the magazine was established; he and other editors wrote under pseudonyms, partly to hide how few people were involved in the production of the magazine. In the first year, each issue contained one short novel which was 50 to 80 pages long; after that the format became a bit longer and a short story or poem was often added after the novel. The covers were illustrated with scenes from novels or daily life; many of these were done by Malang-based illustrator Tan Liep Poen.

The contents of the magazine also reflected shifting tastes among Chinese Indonesian readers; while publications of the 1910s had often consisted of historical martial arts or cloak-and-dagger stories set in China, Penghidoepan often printed stories written and set in the contemporary Dutch East Indies. Although moralism, drama, and intrigue remained popular, realism and modernity became equally important, as reflected in the name of the magazine, "Life". For example, journalist and writer Tan Hong Boen often traveled around Java by bicycle, touring villages and coming up with ideas for stories he would print in Penghidoepan and other magazines. The magazine also published original stories by women authors such as Nyonya The Tiang Ek and Chan Leang Nio, something which was unheard of in the Indies before the 1920s. Together the materials printed in Penghidoepan and related magazines like Tjerita Roman are thought to make up the golden age of Peranakan Chinese literature.

In 1928 or possibly 1929 the three men who had launched Penghidoepan started a new literary monthly called Tjerita Roman; Soe Lie Piet (the father of activist Arief Budiman) became Penghidoepan's new editor; like his predecessor, he published a number of his novels in the magazine.

In 1930 Chen Hue Ay became the third and final editor of the magazine; he held the post until 1942.

Penghidoepan was closed in 1942 with the Japanese invasion of the Dutch East Indies.

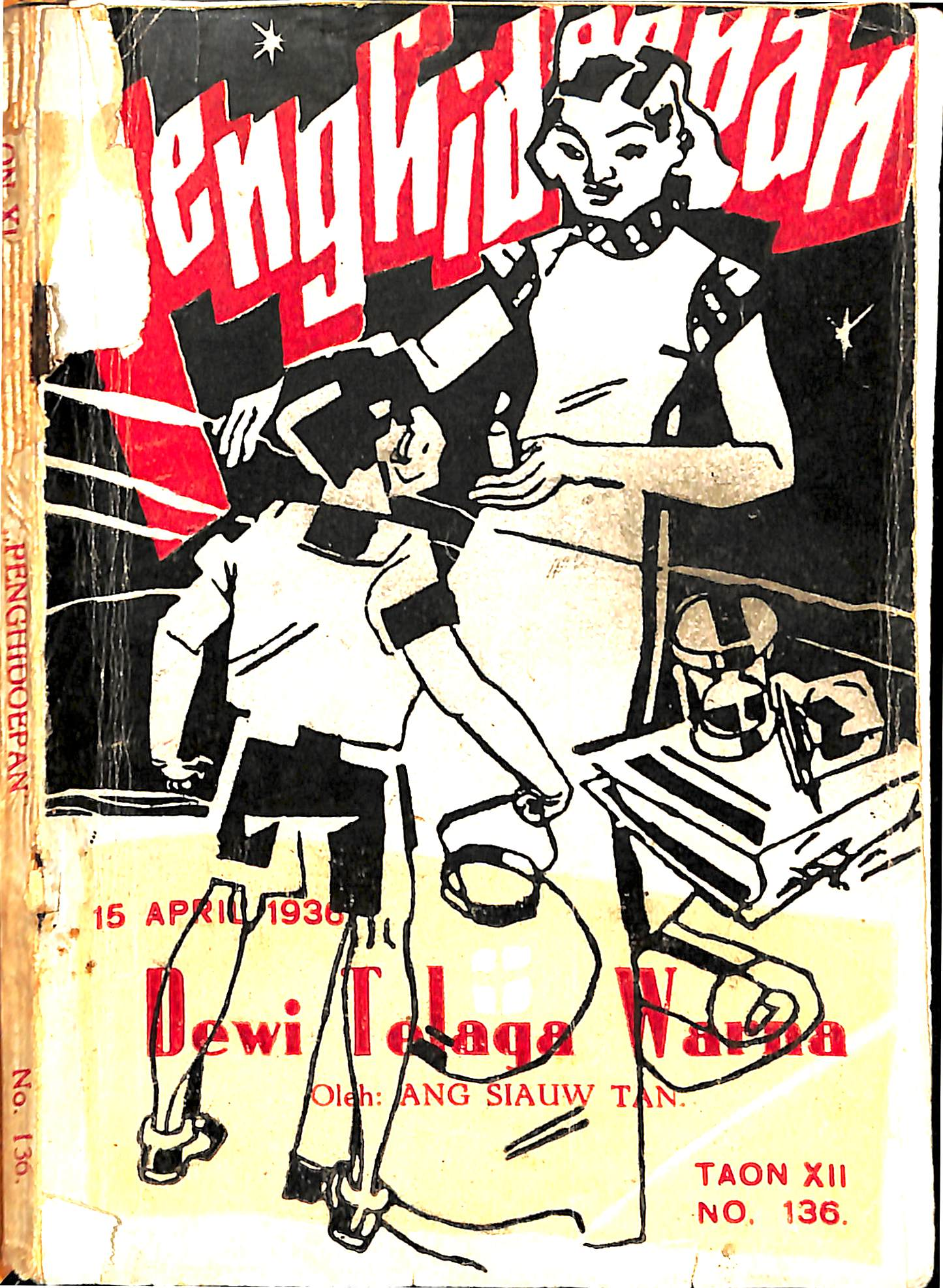
Cover of Penghidoepan, April 1936
