= Carlo Tabalujan =

Indonesian businessman (1924–2011)

Carlo Hein Tabalujan
- Born: Tan Tjin Hin; 18 April 1924; Buitenzorg, Dutch East Indies
- Died: 10 November 2011 (aged 87)

Carlo Tabalujan
- Traditional Chinese: 譚欣下巴
Transcriptions
Standard Mandarin
- Hanyu Pinyin: Tán Xīn Xiàba

Carlo Hein Tabalujan (born Tan Tjin Hin 譚欣下巴; 18 April 1924 – 10 November 2011) was a Chinese Indonesian businessman and entrepreneur of Hokkien origin. He was the head and founder of Indonesian conglomerate PT. Sumber Selatan Nusa.

== Early life ==
He was born in Buitenzorg (today's Bogor) in 1924, named Tan Tjin Hin. He adopted the Indonesian family name of Tabalujan soon after Indonesia became independent. He was the fourth son of an Indonesian Chinese trader in a small town near Bogor. The family moved to Manado in Sulawesi and prospered until the outbreak of the Pacific War in 1941 which resulted in the complete loss of the family business.

He was educated at the Anglo-Chinese College on the island of Kulangsu near Xiamen, (Amoy) and at a business college in Jakarta, Carlo Tabalujan at the age of seventeen was stranded without money when the Japanese occupied Java. He survived for three and a half years with help from schoolmates and poorly paid work. In 1945, his first professional job was with the British Seaforth Highlanders, part of the Allied Forces that landed to liberate Indonesia from the Japanese.

== Career ==
In 1945, he began trading by renting a desk in the office of a businessman. He created successful trading and manufacturing businesses. These involved relationships with a number of international companies as his long-term partners, leading to joint ventures controlling about a dozen affiliated companies under the Sumber Selatan umbrella. These included PT Nestlé Indonesia, PT Danapaints Indonesia, PT Century Batteries, PT Maskapai Ansuransi; Union-Far East and PT Dan Motor Indonesia Vespa. The latter became Indonesia's leading manufacturer and distributor of motorcycles, automotive and decorative parts. In 1994, Carlo Tabalujan strengthened the company's interest in the motorcycle industry by a joint venture with Kawasaki motorcycles and heavy industries.

In 1972, the Australian Dairy Board monopoly expired. Thereafter, Nestlé Indonesia continued to diversify its consumer goods portfolio to local markets. Products such as Nescafé Coffee, Milkmaid and Dancow milk powder. Tabalujan served as a member of the board of Nestlé Indonesia with his two eldest sons Hans and James Tabalujan.

== Family ==
He married Tine Kamboean. Together they had four sons and one daughter; Hans G. Tabalujan, James D. Tabalujan, Heyley L. Tabalujan, Peter L. Tabalujan and Benny S. Tabalujan. Carlo had fifteen grandchildren and three great grandchildren.

== Autobiography ==
Tabalujan's autobiography was Fifty Years of Business in Indonesia. His coauthor was Richard Tallboys. Two editions were published. It was published by Carnegie Publishing in 1997.

Co-Author Richard G. Tallboys (1931-2013) held the Order of the British Empire and the Order of St. Michael and St. George and served as Australian Trade Commissioner in Indonesia, 1966-7, and as the British ambassador to Vietnam 1985-7.

== Bibliography ==
- Tabalujan, Carlo H.; Tallboys, Richard (1996), Fifty years of business in Indonesia (1945–95) : an autobiography), Pentland Press, ISBN 978-1-85821-341-5
- Soebadio-Noto Soebagio, Haryati (1978), Dynamics of Indonesian History, North-Holland Pub.Co, ISBN 9780444850232
- Frey, Marc (2003), The transformation of Southeast Asia: international perspectives on Decolonization, An East Gate Book, 2003, By M.E Sharpe, ISBN 9780765631855
- Setyautama, Dr.Sam (1980), Tokoh-Tokoh Etnis Tiongha di Indonesia, Mihardja Pub.Co, ISBN 9789799101259
- Economic bulletin – Singapore International Chamber of Commerce

Who's who in the world, 1991-1992-Marquis Who's Who, 1990 – Biography & Autobiography – 1218 pages
