= Oen Tjhing Tiauw =

Chinese Indonesian writer and cultural activist

Oen Tjhing Tiauw (1970)

Oen Tjhing Tiauw (1900–1981, Chinese: 温清兆) was a Chinese Indonesian writer, politician and cultural figure active in the Dutch East Indies and Indonesia from the 1920s to the 1970s. From the 1930s onwards he was sympathetic to Indonesian nationalism and worked towards independence from the Dutch as a member of the Partai Tionghoa Indonesia and later the Socialist Party of Indonesia.

== Biography ==
Oen Tjhing Tiauw was born on 29 May 1900 in Malang, East Java, Dutch East Indies. He studied at a Tiong Hoa Hwee Koan school in Jombang. In 1913 he moved to Surabaya. In around 1920 he founded a student association named Hak Sing Hui and sat on its board; it soon merged with another similar group to form the Chung Hwa Hsueh Shing Lien Ho Hui (United Chinese students association), later renamed Chung Hwa Student Football Club. In 1932 he became secretary of that football club. He was also involved in founding a federation of branches of the Hoo Hap Hui called Central Hoo Hap.

In the early 1920s he became interested in the theatre and acting, and played a role in a Njoo Cheong Seng play in 1922. He wrote plays of his own, sometimes using the pseudonym Ontjom, including one in 1924 named Siapa jang berdosa? (who is guilty?) which played to some success. He continued to write plays in the 1920s and 1930s but most of them have been lost. At some point he became a journalist and prose writer, submitting short stories, novels and political articles to Sin Tit Po, among the most pro-Indonesian of Chinese-owned newspapers, and serving on its editorial board. In the early 1930s he wrote for Sin Po, the most widely-read Chinese Indonesian newspaper. He also became a member of the Partai Tionghoa Indonesia (Chinese Indonesian party) in 1930, showing the development of his political thinking towards Indonesian nationalism.

In 1938 he was involved in the foundation of a Chinese trade union called Lau Tung Hui (Indonesian: Serikat Boeroe Tionghoa, Chinese workers union) with the support of the Hoo Hap Hui and the Partai Tionghoa Indonesia. With the start of the Second Sino-Japanese War in 1937 he turned to more explicitly Chinese nationalist themes in his plays and short stories, often adapting historical stories about foreign invasions of China and heroic defenses. During the Japanese occupation of the Dutch East Indies he may have been interned in a camp.

During the Indonesian National Revolution he was sympathetic to the Indonesian republican side and was a founder and secretary of the Servants of Society group in Surabaya, a left wing pro-Indonesian Peranakan Chinese study group and political organization which lasted into the 1950s. After Indonesia achieved its independence he remained in Surabaya and was involved in show business as a producer, including Variety shows, pageants, and theatre. He was also involved in charity efforts for displaced people including the Chinese Relief Committee in Surabaya, trying to organize infrastructure to repatriate local Chinese people who were imprisoned during the war, and charity fairs held by the Tiong Hoa Hwee Koan. Another charitable effort was a foundation he helped establish in Surabaya to increase friendly ties between local Chinese and Indonesians, and to fund scholarships for Indonesian students to study abroad in China every year.

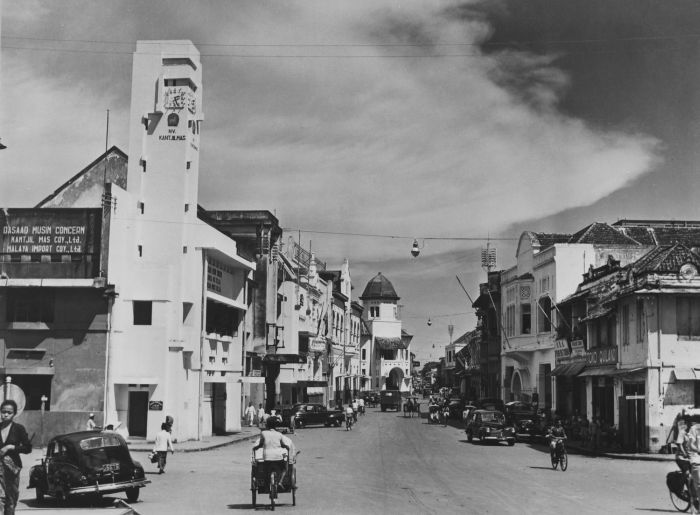
Surabaya in the 1950s

He also worked for a new Chinese Indonesian literary biweekly journal published in Indonesian and Dutch called Sedar. In the early 1950s, Oen was invited by Siauw Giok Tjhan to join BAPERKI, a left-wing Peranakan party; however, he did not accept and joined the Socialist Party of Indonesia instead, and worked to build connections between that party and the local Surabaya Chinese community. A few years later, as Indonesia was attempting to normalize the citizenship status of many of its residents (including most Indonesian Chinese who had been considered citizens of the Republic of China during the late colonial period), he took an active role in trying to help those who wanted it to obtain the proper paperwork to become normalized Indonesian citizens. He was a key member of a group in Surabaya called the Surabaya Working Committee for Indonesian Citizenship (Indonesian: Panitia Pekerdja Kewarganegaraan Indonesia Surabaja) which attempted to hold meetings between immigration officials and Chinese residents without status who wanted to prove their family ties to the country. The committee also sorted out issues for those who opted to remain foreign citizens (for example, with the People's Republic of China) and who may have accidentally registered as passive citizens or voters in Indonesia.

In the 1950s he became a newspaper agent. He also became more interested in Confucianism and Buddhism later in life and became a patron of a Buddhist temple in Surabaya in 1969. During the Transition to the New Order he was vocal in defending the rights of Confucians and Buddhists to continue practicing their beliefs in the face of some official accusations of disloyalty.

He died in March 1981.
