= Yap Goan Ho =

Yap Goan Ho (Chinese: 葉源和, died 1894) was a Chinese Indonesian translator, businessman, bookseller, and publisher based in Batavia, Dutch East Indies. In the 1880s and 1890s, he was one of the first Chinese Indonesians to own a printing press and the first to publish Chinese language novels in Malay language translations.

== Biography ==
Yap was born in Batavia, Dutch East Indies in the nineteenth century, although the exact date is unknown.

Before entering into the printing business, he apparently made his money with a business selling pork. Around 1883 he acquired a printing press and started to get contracts to print books for schools and government offices. In the 1880s, he turned to the popular market and began to publish Chinese novels in illustrated Malay translations, which became very popular among the Peranakan who spoke Malay as their first language and often could not read Chinese. He may have been the first publisher to do so, and was followed not long after by Lie Kim Hok. His most popular translation was The Travels of Emperor QianLong in South China (1883). He also continued to publish educational, reference, and religious books, and even published Malay books in the Jawi script.

In June 1888 he launched a Malay-language newspaper Sinar Terang in Batavia, with himself as publisher and an Indo man named W. Meulenhoff as editor. Meulenhoff had previously worked as a government clerk and at the newspaper Pembrita Betawi. Sinar Terang, a four-page paper, was distributed in cities around Java and Sumatra; it had a mostly Chinese readership and was published until around 1898.

In October 1891 Yap was embroiled in legal troubles around his press and publications; the police temporarily closed his operation and impounded his materials over accusations of stolen papers from the national printing house which were found in his offices. Yap had a contract to print for the government printing house, which is how he had come into possession of them. He also tried to found a second newspaper in 1894, Chabar Berdagang, but it was not successful and quickly closed.

In around 1893 he announced plans to open a new publishing house in Semarang, Central Java. Some historians believe it never actually opened. Although some sources state that he died in 1904, contemporary obituaries seem to confirm that Yap actually died in 1894.

Yap's companies continued to operate in his name after he died, and in 1897 announced the importing of workers from China to work for the Semarang branch of the business. In 1901 Yap's company went bankrupt and was forced to sell off assets in Batavia and Semarang. One of the printing presses was bought and shipped to Surakarta for a new Chinese press there, while Kho Tjeng Bie took over the part of the business that printed translated Chinese novels in Batavia.

== Selected works ==
- Boekoe tjerita di negri Tjina tempo Hongtee Han Boen Tee merk Han Tiauw jang terseboet Sam Ha Bengtjoe Po Kiam (1883, Translation of the novel Sanhe mingzhu baojian quanzhuan)
- Boekoe tjerita dari Tjina merk Taij Tjeng Tiauw dari Hongtee Kian Long Koen tersalin dari boekoe Tjina (1883, Translation of Qianlonghuang you jiangnan)
- Bou Kou Sin Tjiong: Satoe piadjaran baik bagei orang lelaki dan prampoean, tersalin dari roepa-roepa kitab tjina dan di tambain dengen swatoe pringetan (1890)
- Boekoe tjerita Siauw Soat Kim Kouw Ki Koan, tersalin dari boekoe tjerita-an Tjina ada 12 donengan jang bagoes bagoes (1893, translation from Chinese short story collection)

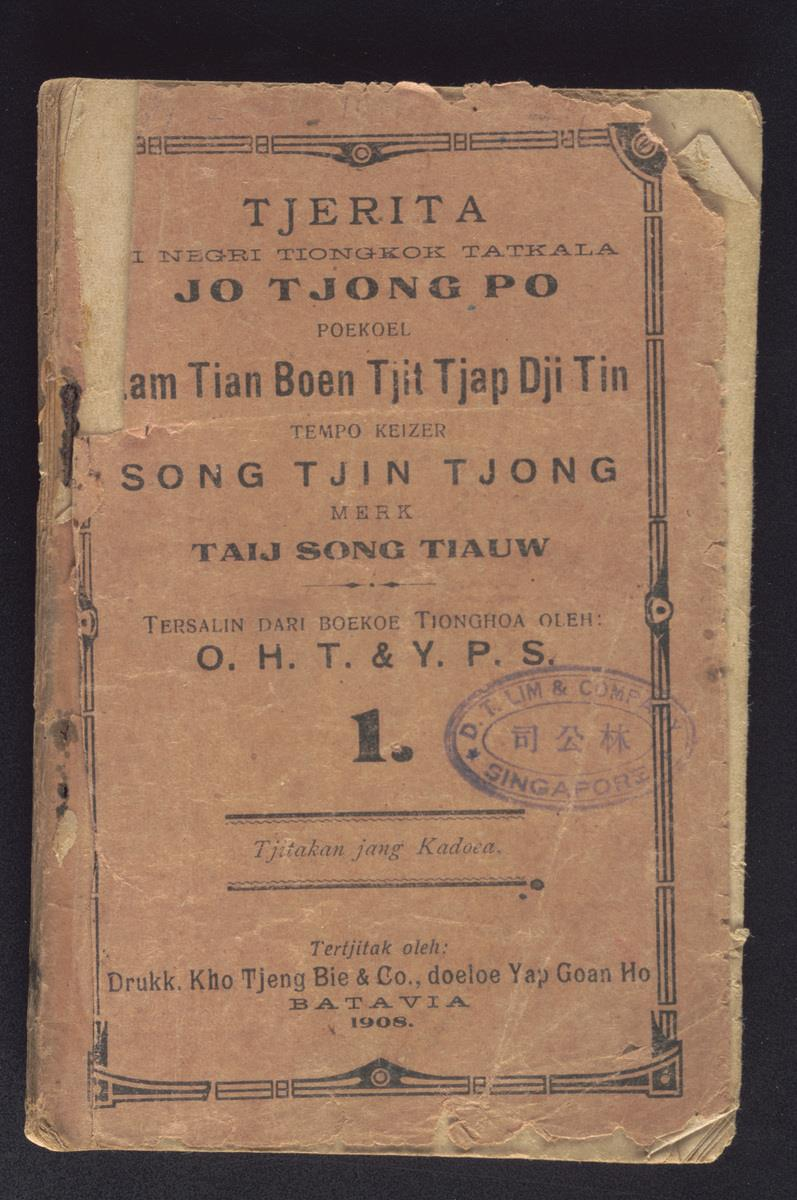
Tjerita Dari Negri Tiongkok Tatkala Jo Tjong Po (1908)

- Tjerita dahoeloe kala di negri Tjina tersalin dari boekoe Tjina See Ijoe ditjeritaken pada waktoe Tje Thian Taij Seng baroe mendjelema djadi monjet (24 volumes, 1895-1902, Boen Sing Hoo's translation of Journey to the West (Xiyou ji) published by Yap)
- Tjerita doeloe kala di Negri Tjina tersahn dari boekoe Lo Tou Tjeng Souw Pak tempo hongte Lie Sie Bin merk Tong Tiauw oleh Goan Bie Hoo (1899)
