= Lie Sim Djwe =

Chinese Indonesian translator

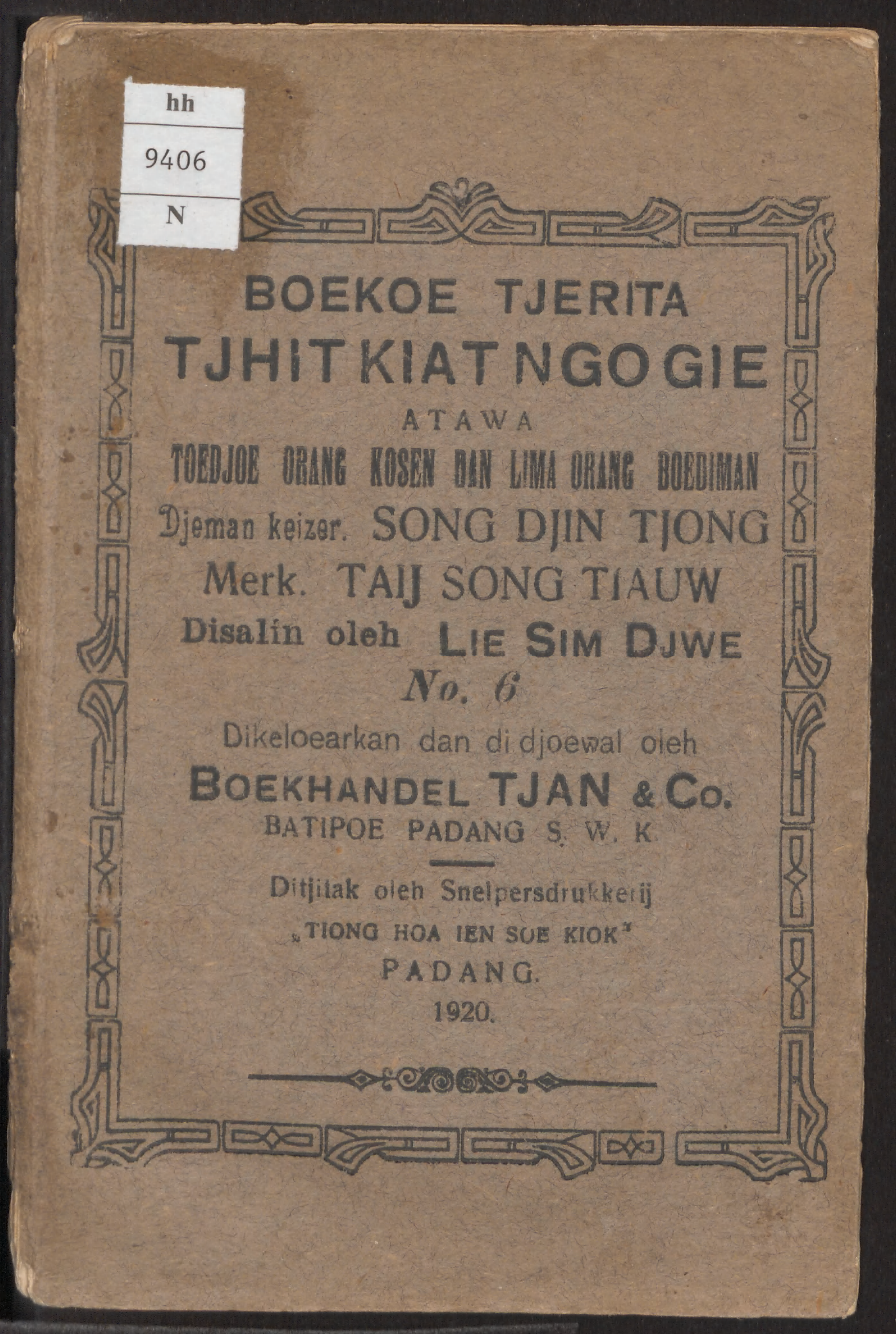
Cover of Boekoe Tjerita Tjhit Kiat Ngo Gie by Lie Sim Djwe

Lie Sim Djwe, who also published under the name Lie Sien Djioe, was a Chinese Indonesian writer, journalist, and translator active in the Dutch East Indies and Indonesia from the 1910s until the 1950s. His major contribution was the translation of Chinese-language novels into Malay.

== Biography ==
Little is known about Lie's early life, although he was probably born in Java or Sumatra around the turn of the twentieth century. Although he published in some Padang, West Sumatra publications throughout his life, he also regularly worked and published in Surabaya (specifically Gresik Regency), and so he most likely lived there.

In 1915, Lie started contributing translations of Chinese novels to Sri Soematra, a Padang-based publication. He continued to translate and publish steadily for the next few decades; he was especially interested in historical novels (Wuxia, cloak-and-dagger) which were going out of fashion at around this time, as well as short stories with contemporary plots relating to heroic figures of the 1911 Revolution and its aftermath. Many of them were adapted from well-known historical Chinese novels, whereas others seem to be based on anonymous or now-forgotten works.

In 1918 he worked for a Surabaya bimonthly magazine named The Young Republican. The magazine was persecuted by Dutch authorities by 1920 and shut down after being accused of Bolshevism. He was also editor-in-chief of the paper Hoa-Po in Grissee in the early 1920s. During that time he also worked at a bookstore and published named Pek & Co., which published some of his books.

In 1930 he became editor of Semangat, a literary magazine from Pare in East Java. At some point, he was also the editor of another literary magazine called Kiam Hiap.

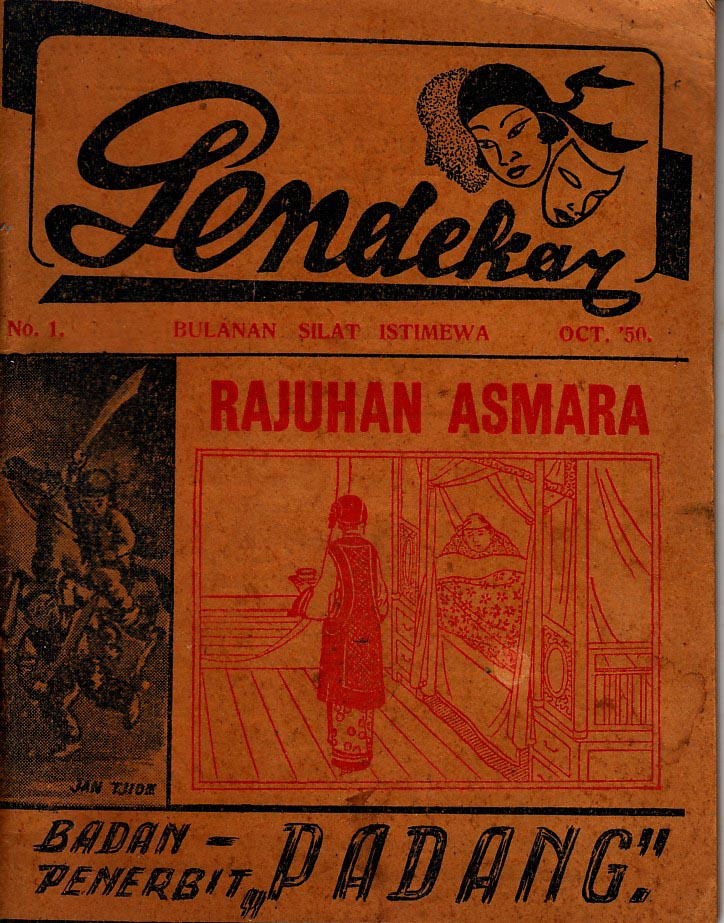
Pendekar: bulanan silat istimewa, issue no.1

After Indonesia gained its independence from the Dutch in 1949, he founded Pendekar, boelanan silat istimewa, which was a monthly magazine focused on translations of martial arts (Silat) and cloak-and-dagger tales.

The circumstances of his later life and death are unknown.

== Selected works ==
- Hikajat Sam Seng Touw atawa Bintang Tiga Satoe tjerita jang benar telah kedjadian di tanah Siok (Tionkok barat), pada djeman Tong Tiauw (1915–16, serialized in Sri Soematra, translation of a Chinese story "the Three Stars story")
- Tjerita Tjhit Khiat Ngo Gie atawa toedjoe orang kosen dan lima orang boediman djeman keizer Song Djin Tjong merk Taij Song Tiauw (1916, serialized in Sri Soematra, translation of a Chinese novel "The Seven Heroes and the Five Gallants")
- Beng Lee Koen atawa Liong Hong Pwee Tjaij Seng Jan (1921, printed by Semangat, translation of a Chinese novel "The Resurrection of a Dragon and Phoenix Couple")
- London dan Boetjiang. Satoe tjerita jang bener kedjadian tempo terbitnja revolutie pertama di Tiongkok (1922, published by Pek Co. in Surabaya, probably a Chinese translated work)
- Tjerita Nona So Ngo (1931, serialized in Semangat)
- Theng Gwat Lauw atawa glombangnja pertjintaan, tjerita jang telah kedjadian di Tiongkok pada djeman Beng Tiauw (1933, 6 volumes, translation of Chinese novel "The Pavilion for Contemplating the Moon")
- Mr Dr. Oei Boen Lie (1933)
- Hok Kwi Lauw (1933, translation of a Chinese novel printed in Jombang)
- Tjinta kasih wanita (1950, printed in Pendekar
- Kasih mesra wanita (date unknown, a novel printed in Surabaya)
