= Insan Mokoginta =

Indonesian Islamic preacher (1949–2020)

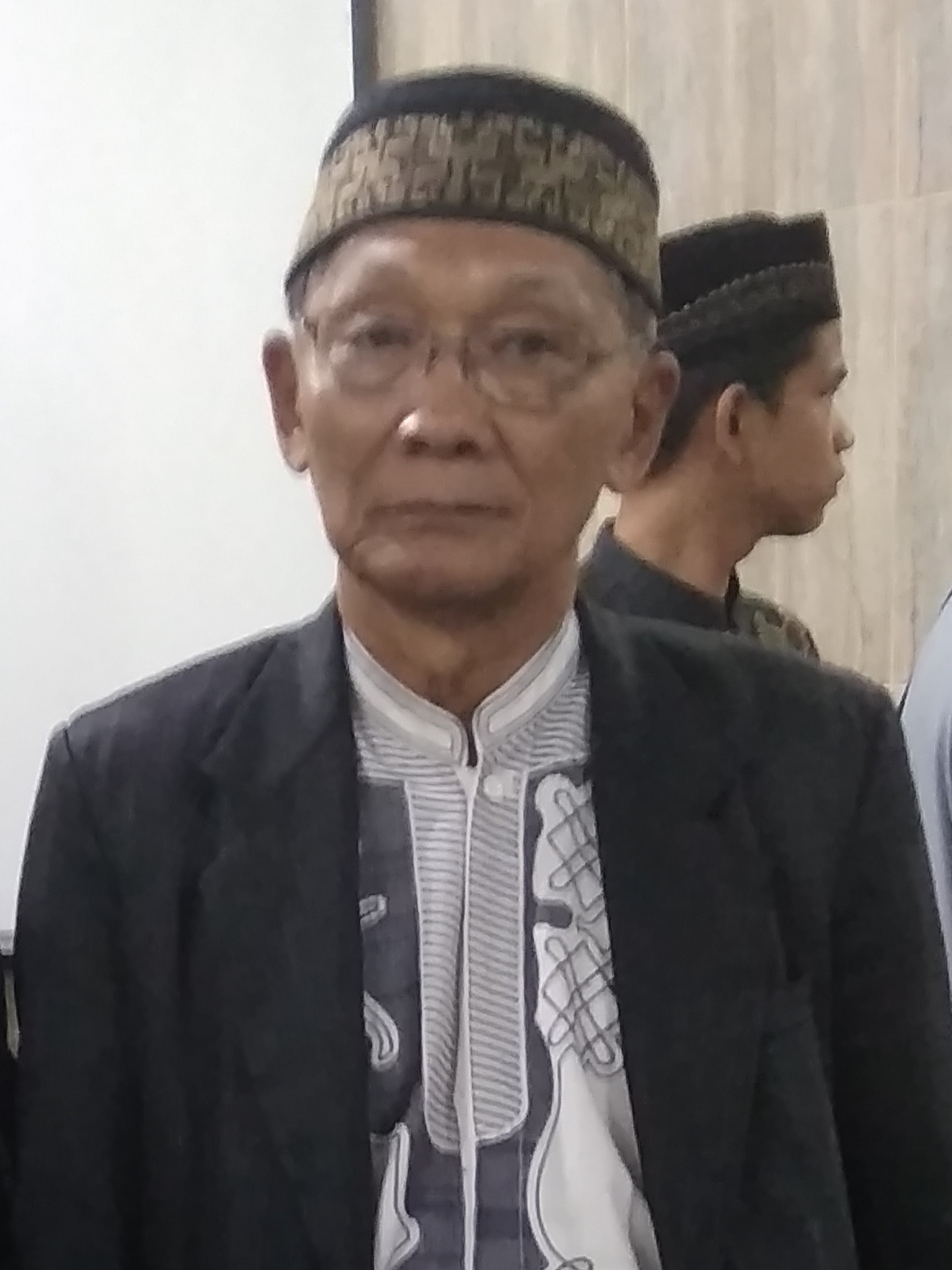
- Insan Mokoginta, 2020
- Born: Insan Latif Syaukani Mokoginta; 8 September 1949; Kotamobagu, Indonesia
- Died: 20 August 2020 (aged 70); South Tangerang, Indonesia
- Occupations: Islamic preacher, Christologist

Insan Latif Syaukani Mokoginta or commonly called Insan Mokoginta (8 September 1949 – 20 August 2020) was an Indonesian Islamic preacher. He is known as one of the Christology figures in Indonesia and administrators of the Center for the Mualaf Foundation.

Mokoginta was born to a father from Chinese descent and his mother came from Kotamobagu. Because his family considered all religions to be true and the same, they freed their children's choice to follow any religion and Mokoginta was sent to a Catholic school. He claims to be Catholic because of the influence of education from his school.

The economic difficulties that he experienced after graduating from high school forced him to leave his homeland and he went to Jakarta. In Jakarta he worked for a businessman named Waruba Yarub. Mokoginta often witnessed Yarub educating his children by leading the five daily prayers in congregation. However, according to Mokoginta, there was no problem whatsoever from the family of the businessman when he learned that Mokoginta was non-Muslim.

In 1980, Mokoginta decided to convert to Muslim. His preaching career began with writing a book on the theme of comparative religion. The book was then reproduced and distributed for the public to read. From writing books, Mokoginta later appeared in public as a preacher.

Actor Roger Danuarta was the last person he guided to convert to Islam. On 20 August 2020, Mokoginta was reported died when he was rushed to Eka Hospital, South Tangerang. Later it was discovered that he died while carrying out the sunnah prayer badiah maghrib. He was buried at the Pondok Ranggon Public Cemetery.
