= James Danandjaja =

Indonesian anthropologist and folklorist (1934–2013)

- Born: Tan Soe Lien; 13 April 1934; Batavia, Dutch East Indies
- Died: 21 October 2013 (aged 79); Depok, Indonesia
- Education: University of Indonesia; University of California, Berkeley
- Known for: Scholarship on the folklore of Indonesia
- Awards: Medal for Service in National Culture (2002)
- Scientific career
- Fields: Cultural anthropology; folklore studies
- Workplaces: University of Indonesia
- Doctoral advisor: Koentjaraningrat

Chinese name
- Traditional Chinese: 陳士林
- Simplified Chinese: 陈士林
Transcriptions
Standard Mandarin
- Hanyu Pinyin: Chén Shìlín
Southern Min
- Hokkien POJ: Tân Sū Lîm

James Danandjaja, born Tan Soe Lien (Chinese: 陳士林; Pe̍h-ōe-jī: Tân Sū Lîm; 13 April 1934–21 October 2013) was an Indonesian anthropologist known as the foremost scholar on Indonesian folklore. He was a professor of anthropology at the University of Indonesia for nearly twenty years, establishing the field of Indonesian folkloristics. He studied under the eminent anthropologist Koentjaraningrat and renowned folklorist Alan Dundes.

Danandjaja's contributions to the fields of cultural anthropology and folklore studies have been recognized by the Indonesian government, which awarded him the Medal for Service in National Culture in 2002. Despite the University of Indonesia not having a folklore program, he taught folkloristics to many of his students and supervised their doctoral dissertations. Those students, in turn, disseminated his teachings throughout Indonesia. In 1984, he published Indonesian Folklore, which won the Best Book Award from the Foundation for Fine Books. Many of his writings, however, are not accessible in the English-speaking world.

He was the child of ethnic Chinese parents. Following the May 1998 riots of Indonesia, he became an outspoken critic of country's authoritarian New Order government and its policies discriminating against Chinese Indonesians. He published Chinese Folklore in 2007 as an attempt to cure a cultural "amnesia" in the community caused by the government suppression of Chinese folklore.

== Early life and education ==
James Danandjaja was born on 13 April 1934 in Batavia, the capital of the Dutch East Indies colony. His father, an ethnic Chinese man with the surname Tan, was a cashier at a private company; his mother operated a beauty salon in Malang, East Java. He was the second of the couple's three sons.

Danandjaja began his primary schooling at Dutch Chinese Schools in Malang and Surabaya. During this time, he began learning ballet and Javanese and Balinese dances under the tutelage of the pesindhèn vocalist Nyi Tjondrolukito. After completing primary education in 1947, following the proclamation of Indonesian independence, he briefly attended a junior high school in Surabaya before transferring to a school operated by Tiong Hoa Hwe Koan association in Batavia (by then renamed to Jakarta). He continued into senior high school in 1951 and graduated in 1955, though he did not enter university immediately and instead taught ballet in Jakarta. He could not teach Javanese dance because he did not play gamelan.

== Anthropologist and folklorist ==
In 1963, Danandjaja enrolled at the University of Indonesia (UI) to study anthropology. During his studies, he became an assistant to the eminent anthropologist Koentjaraningrat, who endorsed him for a scholarship to continue his studies in the United States. Danandjaja began graduate work at the University of California, Berkeley, in 1969 and studied under folklorist Alan Dundes, graduating with a Master of Arts degree in 1971. His thesis was later published as An Annotated Bibliography of Javanese Folklore. While in California, he also learned the Martha Graham style of modern dance. Upon returning to Indonesia, Danandjaja enrolled in a Ph.D. program under the supervision of Koentjaraningrat. His dissertation was an ethnography of farming communities in the Balinese village of Trunyan. In 1972, he introduced a new course on Indonesian folklore in the anthropology department at UI and established the field of Indonesian folkloristics. He completed his Ph.D. in 1977 and subsequently published two books on the topic.

Danandjaja received an appointment as professor of anthropology at UI in 1980. He stopped dancing at the same time to focus on teaching. That same year, he began a two-year non-degree program on anthropology of psychiatry at the University of California, San Francisco. He also returned to Berkeley for a one-year appointment as a Fulbright guest professor. Danandjaja taught at UI for almost twenty years, becoming an emeritus professor in 1999. He supervised doctoral students, including children's literature writer Murti Bunanta. He published Indonesian Folklore (Folklor Indonesia) in 1984, which won the Best Book Award from the Foundation for Fine Books (Yayasan Buku Utama) in 1987. Danandjaja also published book serials on folk stories from around Indonesia for children and wrote books on Japanese folklore and American folklore. He held appointments as visiting lecturer at Krida Wacana Christian University, Gadjah Mada University, Sam Ratulangi University, Cenderawasih University, Udayana University, and the University of Malaya. President Suharto awarded him the Civil Servants' Length of Service Medal (Satyalancana Karya Satya) in 1991, for 25 years of service, and in 1998, for 30 years of service. In recognition of his contributions to the fields of cultural anthropology and folklore studies, the Indonesian government awarded him the Medal for Service in National Culture (Satyalancana Kebudayaan) in 2002.

Danandjaja retired from academic teaching in 2004, and he became a consultant on Chinese culture for the Chinese Indonesian Clans Social Association (Paguyuban Sosial Marga Tionghoa Indonesia). Following the May 1998 riots, he began actively condemning discrimination against Chinese Indonesians and accused Suharto's New Order government of suppressing Chinese folklore during its regime, resulting in many Chinese Indonesians losing their ethnic identity. He once joked of using the alias Kasnawi Karna Dipanegara, short for bekas Cina-Betawi tukar nama karena dipaksa negara (lit. 'a former Chinese-Jakartan who changed his name because he was forced to by the state'), alluding to a government regulation requiring "foreign" names be Indonesianized. In a 2008 interview with The Jakarta Post, Danandjaja explained that he was motivated to write Chinese Folklore to help cure the cultural "amnesia" among Chinese Indonesians who grew up under the regime.

After a stroke in November 2007, Danandjaja could only travel in a wheelchair. He died on 21 October 2013 at Bhakti Yudha General Hospital in Depok, West Java, from complications related to an illness.

== Legacy ==
As the pioneer of Indonesian folkloristics, Danandjaja has been called the country's "doyen of folklore studies". However, because Dundes encouraged him to return to Indonesia to work and publish, many of his writings, including Indonesian Folklore, are not accessible in the English-speaking world. Javanese literary scholar Suwardi Endraswara assessed that Danandjaja's writings approached folkloristics from the perspectives of multiple disciplines, whereas one of his students, the folklorist Suripan Sadi Hutomo, primarily studied folklore as history. Danandjaja's knowledge of multiple languages facilitated the writing of An Annotated Bibliography of Javanese Folklore, compiling a wide variety of sources written in Dutch, Indonesian, Chinese, English, German, and French from the early nineteenth century to the 1970s. One reviewer praised his summaries of these multilingual sources as "a welcome addition to our limited knowledge of scholarship in this area".

Danandjaja believed folklore studies were not well-established in Indonesia because there is no journal or magazine dedicated to the discipline. Studies of folklore were often published in magazines for anthropology and literature, and books on the topic were often displayed next to literary works in bookstores. At UI, he taught folkloristics to his students despite the university not having a folklore program. Those students completed their own dissertations and disseminated his teachings throughout Indonesia.

== Selected works ==
- Danandjaja, James (1972). An Annotated Bibliography of Javanese Folklore. Occasional Paper. Berkeley, California: Center for South and Southeast Asia Studies, University of California. OCLC 622435.
- Danandjaja, James (1984). Folklor Indonesia: Ilmu Gosip, Dongèng, dan Lain Lain [Indonesian Folklore: The Study of Gossip, Fairy Tales, and Other Things] (in Indonesian). Jakarta: Grafiti Pers. OCLC 11961516.
- Danandjaja, James (1997). Folklor Jepang: Dilihat dari Kacamata Indonesia [Japanese Folklore: Seen from the Indonesian Lens] (in Indonesian). Jakarta: Pustaka Utama Grafiti. OCLC 38304234.
- Danandjaja, James (2003). Folklor Amerika: Cermin Multikultural yang Manunggal [American Folklore: A Single Multicultural Mirror] (in Indonesian). Jakarta: Pustaka Umum Grafiti. ISBN 978-979-444-429-0.
- Danandjaja, James (2007). Folklor Tionghoa: Sebagai Terapi Penyembuh Amnesia terhadap Suku Bangsa dan Budaya Tionghoa [Chinese Folklore: As Therapy for Healing Amnesia in the Ethnic Chinese and Chinese Culture] (in Indonesian). Jakarta: Pustaka Utama Grafiti. ISBN 978-979-444-445-0.
