= Budi =

== People ==
- Budi Anduk (1968–2016), Indonesian actor
- Budi Darma (1932–2021), Indonesian writer
- Budi Gunawan (born 1959), Indonesian police officer
- Budi Putra (born 1972), Indonesian journalist
- Budi Sudarsono (born 1979), Indonesian footballer
- Budi Karya Sumadi (born 1956), Indonesian architect
- Robert Budi Hartono (born 1940), Chinese Indonesian tobacco billionaire

== Other ==
- Budi County, a region in Eastern Equatoria State, South Sudan
- Budi Lake near the coast of Araucanía Region, southern Chile
- Pjetër Budi (1566 – 1622), a bishop of Sapë and the author of four religious works in Albanian
- Budi (philosophy), an Indonesian concept akin to ethical or moral reason
- Budiš, a village and municipality in Turčianske Teplice District in the Žilina Region of northern central Slovakia
- Budhwar, a clan or gotra of Jats found in Uttar Pradesh and Haryana in India
- Budi, Thailand
