= Chinese Indonesian surname =

Many ethnic Chinese people have lived in Indonesia for many centuries. Over time, especially under social and political pressure during the New Order era, most Chinese Indonesians have adopted names that better match the local language.

== History of Chinese Indonesian surnames ==
=== Colonial era until 1965 ===
During the Dutch colonial era, the Dutch administration recorded Chinese names in birth certificates and other legal documents using an adopted spelling convention that was based primarily on Hokkien (Southern Min), the language of the majority of Chinese immigrants in the Dutch East Indies. The administrators recorded the names using the nearest Dutch spelling derived from Hokkien words, which was simplified into Ejaan Lama (lit. 'old spelling').

A similar thing happened in the British Malaya, where the British administrators record the names using English spelling. The spellings of names in the British Malaya and the Dutch East Indies varied because English and Dutch employed distinct spellings for identical sounds. Furthermore, as Hokkien romanization standards did not exist then, some Romanized names varied slightly.

Surname in Pīnyīn and Traditional Chinese	Pe̍h-ōe-jī	Jyutping	British Malaya	Dutch East Indies
Chén (陳)	Tîn	Can^{4}	Chan, Chin, Tan	Tan
Guō (郭)	Keh, Kok	Gwok^{3}	Kok, Kuok, Quek	Kwee, Kwek, Kwik, Que
Huáng (黃)	Hông, N̂g, Ûiⁿ	Wong^{4}	Eng, Ooi, Ng, Uwi, Wee	Oei, Oeij, Oey
Lǐ (李)	Lí	Lei^{5}	Lee, Li	Li, Lie
Liáng (樑)	Liâng, Liông, Niô, Niû	Loeng^{4}	Leong	Liang, Liong
Lín (林)	Nâ, Lêm, Lîm	Lam^{4}	Lim, Ling	Liem
Yáng (楊)	Iâng, Iôⁿ, Iûⁿ	Joeng^{4}	Yeoh, Yeo	Jouw, Njoo
Zhāng (張)	Tiang, Tioⁿ, Tiuⁿ	Zoeng^{1}	Teoh, Teo	Teh, Teo

The spelling convention survived through the Japanese occupation (1942–1945) well into Indonesian independence (1945) and sovereignty acknowledgment by the Dutch government (1949). Since the independent Indonesian government inherited the Dutch legal system, it also survived until 1965 in Sukarno's presidential era.

The Indonesian government later began changing Indonesian spelling to harmonize it with the spelling used for Malay in Malaysia, Singapore and Brunei, first under the Ejaan Soewandi introduced in 1947, and again under Ejaan Yang Disempurnakan (lit. 'perfected spelling') adopted in 1972. Modifications were identified in this updated spelling system. For instance, the Dutch-influenced "oe" became "u", influenced by English. Additionally, the Dutch-style "j" underwent a shift to the English "y." Consequently, alterations in surname spellings occurred; for instance, the surname Lie became Li, Loe became Lu, Njoo became Nyoo, and Oei became Wi.

=== 1966–1998 ===
Following the rise of Suharto to power, the Indonesian government introduced a series of policies that discriminated against the ethnic Chinese population. Among these was a 1966 decree (127/U/Kep/12/1966) that strongly encouraged Chinese Indonesians to adopt Indonesian-sounding names, moving away from the traditional Chinese three-part naming system. This policy was part of a broader effort to assimilate the ethnic Chinese minority.

Many Chinese Indonesians reported changing their names in response to government “suggestions,” often feeling compelled to do so due to the climate of fear and coercion. Others chose to comply voluntarily, though not always free from pressure.

Despite this period of forced assimilation, many members of the Chinese-Indonesian diaspora—particularly those who emigrated to countries such as the Netherlands, Germany, and the United States—have continued to use their original Hokkien surnames. Some had the courage to retain their Chinese names during Suharto’s rule (for example, Kwik Kian Gie; 郭建義), while others may have avoided name changes due to the bureaucratic hurdles involved.

=== 2000–present ===
After Suharto resigned from the presidency, subsequent governments revoked the ban on the ethnic Chinese from speaking and learning Chinese in public. Using the original Chinese surnames is no longer a taboo but only a small minority have decided to re-adopt the original Hokkien names or to use the Mandarin Chinese pīnyīn romanization, pronunciation and spelling. For example, author Maria Audrey Lukito legally changed her name to Audrey Yu Jia Hui (俞佳慧).

Individuals who retain their Indonesian names do it because they remain concerned about the persistence of racial issues, they believe non-Chinese speakers might struggle with pronunciations, it has become a habit from the New Order era, their family no longer speaks Chinese, they believe Chinese names are better when written in hànzì, or they have never given it much thought.

Many Chinese Indonesians born around the New Order era, especially between 2000 and 2003, prefer Western-sounding names for several reasons. Some of these names are associated with Christianity, while others are chosen because they are seen as more modern, trendy, and internationally recognizable. Indonesian names are often viewed as too common, old-fashioned, or not stylish enough. Additionally, Western names offer a broader range of options, better reflect global influences, and align with aspirations for international identity. There’s also a sense that the Indonesian language lacks the expressive vocabulary to convey the deeper meanings people want in a name, making Western names a more appealing alternative.

== Approaches to adopting Indonesian-sounding names ==
There were various strategies that were employed to obtain an Indonesian-sounding name. Most names were Hokkien surname syllables with Western or Indonesian prefix or suffix, resulting in many exotic-sounding names. However, alternative methods were also present. Consequently, individuals with the same Chinese surname may adopt distinct Indonesian-sounding names.

Furthermore, due to the absence of regulations in the past regarding the number of names in legal documents, some Chinese Indonesians might have had an Indonesian-sounding given name without an accompanying surname. This was only addressed in 2022 through Regulation of The Minister of Home Affairs Number 73 of 2022, which stipulated the necessity of having at least two names in one's legal name in Indonesia.

=== Retaining the Chinese surname with an Indonesian given name ===
One of the strategies to create an Indonesian name is to retain their Chinese surname as they are, but have an Indonesian-sounding given name. The placement of their Chinese surname can vary, adhering to either the Western or Chinese naming order. The most common method of adopting Indonesian-sounding names were to obtain a first name alongside an Indonesian surname with elements derived from their Chinese surname. In certain instances, the phonetic spelling of these surnames is utilized instead of their original spelling, likely to aid non-Chinese speakers in accurate pronunciation or reading of the names.

In cases where the western order is maintained, their surname is placed at the end of the name. For example, Sofyan Tan placed his surname Tan (陳) at the end of his name. Other individuals who used this approach include Clara Ng, Felix Siauw, Petrus Kanisius Ojong, Stephen Tong, Sumi Yang, and Warren Hue.

Conversely, individuals who adhered to Chinese naming customs positioned their surname at the beginning of their names. For example, Ong Yenny and Lie A. Dharmawan positioned their surnames Ong (王) and Lie (李), respectively, at the beginning of their full names. An instance of a phonetic spelling alteration is observed in Leo Suryadinata, who changed their respective surnames Liauw (廖) to Leo.

In certain cases, however, the individual retained not only the surname but their entire Chinese name, adding an Indonesian given name at the beginning. This created hybrid names combining both full identities. The pattern resembles the naming convention commonly found among Chinese communities in Singapore and Malaysia, where a Western given name is placed before the full Chinese name. This is exemplified by Albertus Magnus Tan Thian Sing, Teguh Karya (born Steve Liem Tjoan Hok).

=== Adding Indonesian-sounding elements to the Chinese surname ===
The prevalent approach to adopting Indonesian-sounding names involved acquiring a first name paired with an Indonesian surname incorporating elements derived from their Chinese surname. This process includes the addition of Indonesian-sounding names through paragoge, prosthesis, and epentheses between two syllables. This method does not entail any spelling alterations in their names, ensuring that the surname remains unchanged.

In the context of paragoge, Chinese Indonesians adopted Indonesian-sounding surnames by appending a suffix to their Chinese surname. As an example, Kimun Ongkosandjojo adopted his surname by combining his Chinese surname Ong (王) with the suffix -kosandjojo meaning "one who brings victory". Other examples include Lukita for Lu (呂), as used by Enggartiasto Lukita, and Tanoto for Tan (陳), as used by Sukanto Tanoto. As for adding Indonesian names as a prosthesis, Indonesian-sounding prefixes are added directly onto their Chinese surname. This is observed in Taslim and Nursalim for Lim (林), as used by Joe Taslim and Cherie Nursalim, respectively. Another method is maintaining the original Chinese surname and is placed between two syllables as an epenthesis. Examples include Sasongko for Ong (王) and Johanes for Han (韓).

In certain instances, this approach is used by placing the surname at the beginning of the full name, following Chinese naming customs. As an example, Loekito Sudirman placed Loekito, derived from Loe (呂), before his Indonesian given name Sudirman.

=== Adding Indonesian-sounding elements to a phonetically spelled Chinese surname ===
Chinese surnames are combined with Indonesian-sounding names through minor modifications of their Chinese surnames. This process often involves adopting a phonetic spelling. Similar to incorporating Indonesian-sounding names directly to their Chinese surnames, epentheses are employed. This is the most common method employed.

Illustrating this method is Eka Tjipta Widjaja, who constructed his surname by phonetically incorporating Oei (黃), represented as Wi- as a paragoge, and appending the suffix -djaja, meaning "victory". This approach is frequently employed by individuals with the surname Oei (黃) and Wei (魏), leading to the emergence of various names with the prefix Wi-, including Wijaya, Winata, and Wiyoko. Other examples include Danandjaja for Tan (陳), as used by James Danandjaja, Pangestu for Phang (彭) and Phang (馮), as used by Prajogo Pangestu and Mari Pangestu, respectively, and Muljoto for Njoo (楊) used by Agnez Mo.

=== Adopting an indigenous Indonesian surname ===
During the reign of Suharto, Indonesian families may have given their family name to a Chinese person to facilitate their name alterations. Alternatively, some Chinese Indonesians opted for an actual Indonesian surname to better assimilate with neighboring ethnic groups. For instance, the surname Lembong, which is of Minahasan origin, is used by Tom Lembong, with the surname Ong (汪). Lembong's father resided in Manado, the ancestral homeland of the Minahasan ethnic group, implying a possible adoption of Indonesian surnames influenced by the region's geography or neighboring ethnic communities. Another example of this phenomenon is the Moluccan surname Afaratu. Initially exclusive to individuals of the Tanimbarese ethnic group native to the Maluku, this surname has recently been identified among Chinese Indonesians with Hokkien ancestry. Do note that this is different from the adoption of existing Indonesian surnames due to interracial marriages.

Examples of Individuals Employing this Method
Chinese name	Pe̍h-ōe-jī	Indonesian Name	Adopted Indonesian Surname and Associated Ethnic Group
Lo Siang Hien (羅祥興)	Lô Siông Hin	Lo Siang Hien Ginting	Ginting, Batak Karo
Ng Iau Han (黃耀漢)	N̂g Iāu Hàn	Efendi Hansen Ng Sinulingga	Sinulingga, Batak Karo
Ong Joe San (汪友山)	Ong Iú San	Eddie Lembong	Lembong, Minahasan
Ong Lian Wang (汪連旺)	Ong Liân Ōng	Thomas Trikasih Lembong	Lembong, Minahasan
Tjan Tjoen Hok (曾春福)	Chan Chhun Hok	Harry Tjan Silalahi	Silalahi, Batak Toba
Tjoa Ah Hing (蔡亞興)	Chhòa A Hin	Tony Sumampau	Sumampau, Minahasan
Tjoa Ah Sjan (蔡亞聲)	Chhòa A Sêng	Jansen Manansang	Manansang, Sangirese

=== Translating Chinese names into Indonesian-sounding equivalents ===
In employing this strategy, individuals translate their Chinese name into Indonesian, Indonesian regional languages, or common non-native names in Indonesia, such as those with Arabic or Sanskrit influence. For example, Sofjan Wanandi translated his surname Liem (林), which meant "forest", to the old Javanese word "wana". Furthermore, he also added the male suffix -ndi, resulting in the surname Wanandi.

In a newspaper article from 1967, now archived at the National Library of Indonesia, a guide recommended the adoption of Indonesian words as new names for Chinese Indonesians. The article provided direct translations of the meanings of Chinese words, leading to the creation of potential new names for individuals of Chinese descent. For instance, individuals bearing the name Kok (國), which signifies "country", might possess names with the Indonesian translation "negara". Likewise, individuals with the name Ong (王), meaning "king", might have names associated with the words "raja" or "ratu".

=== Including only the Chinese given name ===
In this approach, the surname is typically completely excluded, while at least one of the individual's given names is retained. When incorporating both given names into their Indonesian-sounding names, significant spelling alterations may occur, but the phonetics generally remain the same or similar.

Most commonly, the entirety of an individual's Chinese given name is used in their Indonesian-sounding name. As an example, Mochtar Riady adapted his Chinese given name, Lie Mo Tie (李文正), by transforming Mo to Moch- and Tie to -tar in his Indonesian name. His surname was ultimately excluded. Likewise, Teddy Jusuf utilized his Chinese given name, Him Tek Jie (熊德怡), by converting Tek to Ted- and Jie to -dy in his Indonesian name.

In rare instances, only one of the Chinese given names is included in an individual's Indonesian-sounding name. Christiandy Sanjaya, for example, only integrated San from his Chinese name Bong Hon San (黃漢山; N̂g Hàn Suann) into his Indonesian name. He also added the Sanskrit-derived suffix -jaya, which meant "victory".

=== Adopting entirely new Indonesian names ===
In some cases, the adopted Indonesian-sounding name bears no connection whatsoever to their Chinese name. Sutanto Djuhar's name, for example, lacks any elements from his Chinese name, Liem Oen Kian (林文镜; Lîm Bûn Kèng).

== Examples of Chinese surnames and their Indonesian-sounding adoptions ==
The table is arranged in alphabetical order according to pīnyīn. The table includes only spellings based on the currently-used Ejaan Bahasa Indonesia yang Disempurnakan. Some surnames may appear with older spelling variants, such as Ejaan Lama, or a combination of both current and older systems. For example, the surname Wijaya might be spelled as Widjaja, Widjaya, or less commonly, Oeidjaja. Likewise, Sujatmiko could be spelled as Soedjatmiko or Sudjatmiko.

Surname and Pinyin	Hokkien and Teochew	Cantonese	Hakka	Dutch East Indies	Indonesian-sounding adaptations
愛 (Ài)	Ai, Ain	Oi, Wi	Oi	Ai	Raharja
安 (Ān)	An, Ang, Oan, Uan	On	On	An, Ngon	Andreas, Anandra, Ananta, Andy, Anita, Hadi
白 (Bái)	Beh, Peeh, Peh, Pek, Piak	Baak, Bak	Phak	Pee, Peh, Pek	Fatimah, Pekasa, Pekerti, Peris, Prawiro, Purnomo, Wongsorejo
鮑 (Bào)	Bao, Pâu	Baau, Bau	Pau	Pou, Pouw	Pualam, Purnama, Sastrajaya
貝 (Bèi)	Bue, Bui, Poe	Boi, Bui	Bi, Pi	Pui, Poei	Saputra, Sudarto
蔡 (Cài)	Chhai, Chhoa, Cua	Coi, Toi	Chhai	Tjhai, Tjhoa, Tjhoea, Tjhoi, Tjhua, Tjo, Tjoa, Tjoea, Tjua	Agustin, Anthony, Budianto, Cahya, Cahyadi, Cahyo, Ceha, Cipto, Cohara, Cuaca, Cuandi, Effendy, Halim, Harjamulya, Irman, Joakin, Manansang, Muliawan, Satyawardaya, Sujono, Sulaiman, Sunarso, Surya, Susanto, Tirtakusuma, Wonowijoyo
曹 (Cáo)	Cao, Cho	Cou, Tau	Chho	Djau, Jau, Jauw, Tjho, Tjo, Tjou	Cokro, Cokroraharjo, Jasa, Laksamana, Sarana, Susanto, Vonco
常 (Cháng)	Siang, Sien, Sion, Siong, Siun	Siang, Soeng	Song	Song	Kristian, Sukma
陳 (Chén)	Cing, Dang, Ding, Tan, Tin, Ting	Can, Cin	Chhun	Tan, Tjan, Tjhin	Abdulrajabtan, Adil, Alim, Amin, Afaratu, Ananta, Buana, Buasan, Budi, Budianta, Budiman, Candinegara, Chandra, Chandrawati, Chendana, Chendra, Chendriadi, Christian, Cula, Dananjaya, Daritan, Darmawan, Dinata, Gunawan, Hadiwijoyo, Harjosusilo, Hartanto, Hartani, Hartanu, Hartono, Hartati, Haryono, Hasan, Hertanto, Intan, Irtanto, Iskandar, Ismanto, Jonathan (Jonatan), Jonathana, Kartajaya, Kartanegara, Karyadi, Kinan, Limanto, Lolita, Lukman, Mananta, Margatan, Martani, Martoyo, Marwoto, Mawira, Mulyono, Pitoby, Pohan, Prawoto, Raharjo, Robida, Santosa, Santoso, Satyadiningrat, Setiabudi, Setianto, Setiawan, Setyodiningrat, Setyonegoro, Sugondo, Suhartono, Sukowiyono, Sumanto, Sumantri, Sumardi, Surya (Suria), Susanto, Susastro, Sutanto, Sutanu, Sutiarto, Sutyanto, Syamsuddin, Tana, Tanadi, Tanaka, Tanamal, Tanandar, Tanardo, Tanasal, Tanaya, Tandana, Tandanu, Tandany, Tandayu, Tandi (Tandy), Tandiari, Tandika, Tandiono, Tandoko, Tandoyo, Tandra, Tandri, Tandubuana, Tandyawasesa, Tanesha, Tania, Tanin, Tanizal, Tanjiria, Tanjung, Tanojo, Tanlain, Tanoto, Tansil (Tanzil), Tanta, Tantama, Tanti, Tanto, Tantomo, Tantra, Tanu, Tanubrata, Tanudisastro, Tanujaya, Tanumiharja, Tanusaputra, Tanusudibyo, Tanutama, Tanuwibowo, Tanuwijaya, Taslim, Thamrin, Tini, Tirtasana, Viriyanto, Wardoyo, Wijaya, Winarta, Winata, Wirahadi, Young
程 (Chéng)	Teng, Thee, Theng, Thian, Tian	Cing	Chhang	Seng, Sjiung, Thia, Thnia, Thian, Tjing	Ali, Andelma, Sawahanto, Sengani, Susanto
成 (Chéng)	Chhian, Chian, Cian, Sian, Seng, Zian	Cing, Sen, Seng, Siang, Sing	Sang, Sun	Seng, Sjiung, Thia, Thnia, Thian, Tjing	Ali, Andelma, Sawahanto, Sengani, Susanto
崔 (Cūi)	Chhui, Cui	Ceoi	Chhui, Cui	Tjoey	Faustine
戴 (Dài)	Dai, Di, Do, Tai, Te, Ter, Ti	Ai, Daai	Tai	Te, Tee, Thee	Kinarto, Patros, Suteja, Teja, Tejamulia, Tejarukmana, Tejasukmana, Tejokumoro, Teriandy, Thomas
鄧 (Dèng)	Deng, Teng	Ang, Daang	Then	Tang, Teng	Ateng, Hartantik, Liana, Susilawati, Tenggara, Tengger, Tranggono
丁 (Dīng)	Deng, Teng	Ding, En	Ten	Teng, Ting	Ateng, Hartantik, Liana, Susilawati, Tenggara, Tengger, Tranggono
董 (Dǒng)	Dang, Dong, Tang, Tong	Dung	Dung, Tung	Tang	Lintang
杜 (Dù)	Dou, To	Dou, U	Tu, Thu	Tou, Touw	Basri
范 (Fàn)	Hoan, Huam, Huang	Faan	Fam	Fam, Hoan, Hwan, Van	Famita, Fandi, Fania, Handoko, Hoana, Hoanike, Hoanita, Hoanoto, Limantara
方 (Fāng)	Bang, Beng, Bung, Hng, Hong, Huang, Pang, Png, Puin	Fong	Fong	Pheng, Phui, Poei, Poeij, Poeng, Poey	Frans, Pribadi, Prihandi, Pujiadi, Yulia
房 (Fáng)	Bang, Hong, Pang, Phong, Pong	Fong	Fong, Piong	Phong, Pong	Frans, Pribadi, Prihandi, Pujiadi, Yulia
馮 (Féng)	Bang, Hong, Pang	Fung, Fuung	Phung	Hoeng, Pang, Phang	Arif, Effendi, Fangestu, Fungestu, Pangestu, Wiliadinata
符 (Fú)	Hu	Fu	Fu, Phu	Hoe	Hussy
傅 (Fù)	Bou, Hu, Po	Fu	Fu	Poo, Pou, Pouw	Irawan, Priyatna
甘 (Gān)	Gam, Kam, Kan	Gam	Kam	Gam, Kam	Gandimiharja, Prayetno
高 (Gāo)	Gao, Go, Kau	Gau, Gou	Ko	Ko, Kouw	Kartono, Koco, Kosasih, Saleh
古 (Gǔ)	Khoe, Koo	Khu, Ku	Hioe, Hiu	Hiu, Kho, Koe, Koo, Kou, Kouw, Kow	Basri, Hendarta, Iskandar, Komar, Kosasih (Khosasih), Kowara, Kumala, Kurnia, Kurniadi, Kurniawan, Kusika, Kusnadi, Kusno, Kusuma, Nawing, Sugiyo, Suripto
關 (Guān)	Guang, Guen, Gueng, Koan, Koen, Kuin	Gan, Gwaan	Guan, Koan	Khoan	Honggandi, Johan, Kantono, Karlam, Kasman, Kosasih, Raharjo
郭 (Guō)	Guag, Gueh, Keh, Kerh, Koeh, Kok	Gwok, Kok	Kok	Kho, Koe, Kok, Kwee, Kwik, Kwok, Oe	Cokrosaputro, Darmawan, Gunawan, Hadiprayitno, Kartawiharja, Kasigit, Kodrata, Kuat, Kumala, Kuncoro, Kurnia, Kurniawan, Kusmita, Kusnadi, Kusuma, Kusumawijaya, Kusumo, Mintarjo, Paramitha, Prasetyo, Santoso, Situwanda, Somadi, Suryatini, Susanto, Valentina, Winata
韓 (Hán)	Han, Hang	Hon	Hon	Han	Burhan, Handaya, Handijaya, Handoko, Handoyo, Hanggar, Hanjaya, Hanjoyo, Hantoro, Hanurakin, Hendra, Pernollo, Suhandi
何 (Hé)	Ho, Oa	Ho	Ho	Ho, Hoo	Hartono, Haryanto, Hendra, Hendrawan, Hengky, Herho, Honarto, Honoris, Hosea, Nugroho, Setiawan, Wahono, Wijaya
賀 (Hè)	Ho	Ho	Fo, Ho	Ho, Hok	Martinus, Pribadi
洪 (Hóng)	Ang, Hong	Hung	Fung	Ang, Hoeng	Aang, Abraham, Andyanto, Angela, Anggakusuma, Anggawarsito, Anggodo, Anggono, Anggoro, Anggraini (Anggreani), Anggriawan, Angkadireja, Angkasa, Angkiat, Angryanto, Angsana, Angwar, Arbi, Darsono, Harsono, Rahmat, Sanggalo, Suryaatmaja, Suryadi, Sutarti, Tahir, Toindo, Wahyudi, Wardhana, Wijaya
候 (Hòu)	Hao, Hau, Hio, Ho	Hau	Heu	Hauw	Minarto
胡 (Hú)	Ho, Hu, O, Ou	Vu, Wu	Fu	Aw, Auw, Oh, Ou, Ouw	Harsono, Husino, Syarifudin
黃 (Huáng)	Hong, Wang, Ui	Wong, Vong	Wung	Bong, Eng, Ng, Oei, Oeij, Oey, Ui, Wee, Whie, Wi, Wong	Alianto, Afaratu, Budiningsih, Darmawan, Darwis, Fajrin, Hadiwinata, Hartono, Himawan, Ingkiriwang, Jingga, Kaliana, Karim, Kariman, Marching, Ngadiman, Ngadimin, Ngadimo, Osteven, Permatasari, Permono, Rahmat, Ridwan, Sabu, Sanjaya, Secadiningrat, Setiawan, Sia, Sugianto, Sujoyo, Sukowidono, Sumanto, Sumawi, Supratikno, Syarif, Tumenggung, Untomo, Uray, Usman, Utara, Wahidin, Wahyudi, Wantah, Wibisono, Wibowo, Widagdo, Widiatmo, Widiyani, Widodo, Widyaningrat, Widyono, Wiguna, Wiharja, Wiharto, Wijaya, Wijayakusuma, Wijoseno, Wikarso, Wikarta, Willy (Willys), Winardi, Winarto, Winata, Winatan, Windra, Winoto, Wiraatmaja, Wiranata, Wirya, Wiryanto, Wiryo, Wiryono, Wisanto, Witular, Wiyadi, Wiyanarko, Wiyono, Wongkar, Wuisan, Wullur
霍 (Huò)	Hok	Fok	Vok	Fok	Darmadi
紀 (Jǐ)	Gi, Ki	Geik	Ki	Ki, Kie, Tjhie, Tjie	Barki, Hadinata
簡 (Jiǎn)	Giang, Gieng	Gin	Gian, Kian, Kien	Gian	Giantoro
江 (Jiāng)	Gang, Kang	Gong	Kong	Kang, Khiong, Kiang, Kong	Budiman, Kangean, Konjaya, Murni, Sinduwinata, Sutomo, Yahya
金 (Jīn)	Gim, Ging, Kem, Kim	Gam, Gim	Kim	Keh, Tjing	Himawati, Kencanawati, Raharjo, Sugimin
柯 (Kē)	Gua, Kho, Ko, Koa	O	Kho	Koa, Kua, Kwa, Kwaa	Koari, Secakusuma, Utomo
鄺 (Kuàng)	Kong, Kuang	-	Fong, Kwong	Kuang	Kondoh, Kongdoro, Mulya
賴 (Lài)	Lai, Loa, Lua, Nai, Noa	Laai, Lai	Lai	Lai, Laij, Lay, Loa, Lua, Luo	Irawan, Laiherman, Laimena, Lainera, Lais, Laiyar, Lasuk, Lasuki, Lohananta, Lohanda, Rasidin, Sasmita, Setiadi
蘭 (Lán)	Lan, Lang	Laan	Lan	Lan	Lany, Liana
黎 (Lí)	Le, Li, Loi	Lai	Lai, Li	Laij, Le, Lee, Li	Layendra, Lerebulan
李 (Lǐ)	Li	Lei	Li	Lee, Li, Lie	Adidarma, Ali (Aly), Aliwarga, Angelina, Boddhihiya, Cahyo, Darma, Darmali, Dipojuwono, Efendi, Elly, Gozeli, Gunawan, Harjali, Hartono, Hakim, Hidayat, Iskandar, Kartikahadi, Kesly, Koty, Kusumo, Laksamanda, Laksana, Laksono, Lamono, Lamsano, Lanandi, Ledesma, Leman, Lemandau, Lemanjaya, Lembata, Leonardo, Lesmana, Liano, Lianto, Liberman, Libriani, Licindo, Licharli, Lidarto, Lika, Liliana, Lilik, Likhwan, Liman (Lyman), Limantika, Limanto, Limena, Linata, Lisan, Lisangan, Listiohadi, Litelnoni, Lius, Liva, Livai, Liyanto, Liyono, Mahatirta, Marlia, Meirobi, Mulia, Muliono, Mulyadi, Mursali, Muslina, Nauli, Pujianto, Ramali, Ramli, Riady, Romuli, Rusli, Sadeli, Sarumaha, Setiady, Setyodiningrat, Sujatmiko, Sukandi, Sulistio, Sunasli, Suparmin, Suryono, Suwondo, Syarif, Taruli, Wahyadiyatmika, Widyanti, Winarko, Wiraatmaja, Wuisan, Yahya, Yulianto
連 (Lián)	Hian, Len, Liam, Lian, Liang, Lieng	Len, Lin	Lien	Lem, Lian, Nie	Lembang, Lembong
樑 (Liáng)	Liang, Liong, Nien, No, Nion, Niu	Liang, Loeng	Liong	Liang, Nio, Niouw	Antonio, Arif, Dewi, Graha, Gunawan, Irawan, Kurniawan, Latif, Liando, Liangani, Melianggan, Nagaria, Nagazaki, Neolan, Neonardi, Niopo, Ninik, Nurjaman, Nurtani, Nurtanio, Rovanio, Santosa, Santoso, Yasin
遼 (Liáo)	Liao, Liau, Liou	Liau, Liu	Liau	Liao, Liauw	Aluwi, Arfandy, Leo, Lunardi, Maulana, Susanto
廖 (Liào)	Liao, Liau, Liou	Liau, Liu	Liau	Liao, Liauw	Aluwi, Arfandy, Leo, Lunardi, Maulana, Susanto
林 (Lín)	Lem, Lim, Na, Nan	Lam, Lim, Lem	Lim	Liem, Lim	Abubakar, Alim, Baroleh, Benly, Biyono, Budianto, Budiharjo, Chandra, Chondrowajoyo, Durianto, Gunawan, Halim, Haliman, Halimkusuma, Hariyadi, Harkata, Haslim, Herlambang, Hidayat, Himawan, Jaya, Juhar, Kalona, Kamil, Karya, Kurniawan, Kusumadiharja, Lamina, Lamiyo, Leman, Lilik, Liman, Limandau, Limandi, Limansubronoto, Limantara, Limantika, Limanto, Limantoro, Limarta, Limaran, Limawan, Limas, Limasi, Limenta, Limiadi, Limianto, Limiardi, Limiarja, Limiati, Limiputra, Linanto, Linardi, Linda, Linus, Lis, Lumenta, Malik, Matius, Mulialim, Mulyadi, Mursalim, Musalim, Muslim, Nalukas, Narmawan, Nastalim, Nurimba, Nursalim, Pribadi, Raharja, Ruslim, Sailan, Salim, Sampurna, Santoso, Satyalim, Setyadi, Setyawan, Sidhunata, Subrata, Sucipto, Sugeng, Sugiarto, Sugiharto, Suharlim, Sujatmiko, Suleman, Sulim, Sulistio, Sumitomo, Sunasto, Surya, Suryana, Susanto, Susilo, Sutanto, Suwana, Talim, Talin,, Wanandi, Wijaya, Winarno, Waworuntu, Witarsa, Wono, Yanto, Yulin
凌 (Líng)	Leng	Ling	Leng	Lin	Thamlin
劉 (Liú)	Lao, Lau, Liu	Lau, Liu	Liu	Lao, Lau, Lauw, Law, Liew, Lioe	Antonius, Fernardo, Hanafi, Jaelawijaya, Kabulloh, Karyadi, Laongan, Lauvin, Lawang, Lawani, Lawanto, Lawardi, Lawijaya, Lawis, Lawita, Lawrence, Laya, Leo, Lovin, Lukito, Meilinda, Mulawarman, Nuralan, Pahlawan, Pranoto, Rosadi, Setiawan, Wijaya, Yahya, Yanti, Zecha
樓 (Lóu)	Lau, Lio, Lo	Lau, Leu	Leu	Lauw, Loe	Antonius, Fernardo, Hanafi, Jaelawijaya, Kabulloh, Karyadi, Laongan, Lauvin, Lawang, Lawani, Lawanto, Lawardi, Lawijaya, Lawis, Lawita, Lawrence, Laya, Leo, Lovin, Lukito, Meilinda, Mulawarman, Nuralan, Pahlawan, Pranoto, Rosadi, Setiawan, Wijaya, Yahya, Yanti, Zecha
盧 (Lú)	Lo, Lou, Lu	Lou, Lu	Lu	Lou, Louw	Wijaya
陸 (Lù)	Lak, Leg, Liok, Log, Lok	Luk, Luuk	Liuk	Liok, Liuk, Loek, Luk	Lukali, Lukita, Lukito, Lukman, Lukmantoro, Luwiharto
呂 (Lǚ)	Le, Li, Lir, Lu	Leoi, Lui	Li	Li, Loe, Loei, Lu	Gunawan, Hamzah, Lukas, Lukita, Lukito, Luksono, Lukmanto, Luksono, Luna, Lunardy, Lusanto, Tirtakusuma
羅 (Luó)	Lo	Lo	Lo	Lo, Loh, Loo, Lou, Ro	Kurniawan, Lofunta, Lokasari, Lolang, Loris, Lukman, Lumampaw, Pranolo, Robert, Robin, Rohana, Rohani, Rosiana, Rowanto, Rowi, Susilo, Samalo
馬 (Mǎ)	Be, Bee, Bhe, Ma	Ma, Maa	Ma	Be, Bhe, Ma, Mah	Suhermanto, Sulendro, Wijaya
麥 (Mài)	Beeh, Beh, Bek, Bheh, Biak	Maak, Mak	Mag, Mak	Mak	Syukur
莫 (Mò)	Boh, Bok, Mog	Mok	Mok	Bok, Moh, Mok	Mokhtar
倪 (Ní)	Ge, Ghoi, Ngi	Ngai	Nga	Ge, Gee, Ngie, Nie, Ny	Gazani, Hidrayat
歐陽 (Ōuyáng)	Aoiang, Auiang, Auiong, Oiong	Aujeong	Euyong	Auwjong, Auwyang, Ojong, Oyong	Ojong, Oyong
潘 (Pān)	Phoan, Phun, Puan, Pung	Pun	Phan	Bwa, Phan, Phnua, Phoa, Phoan, Phwa, Poen	Buanajaya, Bunardi, Pandega, Panduwirja, Pansawira, Pribadi, Pranoto, Pualam, Pualamsyah, Purnomo, Suprana, Supandi, Wisaksana, Trenggono
彭 (Péng)	Pen, Phen, Pheng, Phi	Paang, Pang	Phang	Phang, Phee, Phne	Narthavirosa, Pangalila, Panganiban, Pangestu, Panghehar, Pangilinan, Pangkey, Pirngadi, Pitrajaya, Supangat
秦 (Qín)	Chin, Cing	Ceon, Tun	Chhin, Qin	Tjin	Mardanus
丘, 邱 (Qiū)	Khiu, Khu, Kiu, Ku	Hiu, Jau	Hiu	Hioe, Kauw, Khoe, Khu	Cinora, Hendra, Husen, Kokoh, Komar, Kosasih (Khosasih, Khoosasi), Kosim, Kowara, Kumala, Kurnia, Kurniadi, Kurniawan, Kurniawati, Kusiana, Kusika, Kusnadi, Kusniaty, Kusuma, Kusumawan, Sasanasurya, Sudarmono, Surya, Tirtawinata
全 (Quán)	Cuang, Cueng, Chng, Choan, Chuin	Cyun, Tun	Chhion	Kwan	Ikwanto, Kuanna
饒 (Ráo)	Jiau, Liau, Riao	Jiu	Ngieu	Djiauw, Djauw, Njauw, Jauw, Nyao, Nyauw	Admajaya, Harjono, Jayadarta, Jayadi, Johari
容 (Róng)	Iong	Jung, Yuung	Yung	Joeng	Budiono
沈 (Shěn)	Sim	Sam, Sim	Sum	Siem, Sim, Sun	Budiharjo, Hasim, Islamy, Kasiman, Rochimat, Samudro, Simargi, Simon, Sumardi, Sunardi, Susanti, Yansen, Yatsen, Yusuf
施 (Shī)	Si, Soa	Si	Su	Si, Sie	Cahyadi, Lesmana, Notowijoyo, Sanusi, Setia, Sidharta, Sijaya, Silawati, Sinarta, Siputra
石 (Shí)	Chioh, Sek, Set, Sia, Siak, Zieh, Zioh	Sek, Siak	Sag, Sak	Cioh, Sek, Sik, Tjioh, Tjiok	Seinal
史 (Shǐ)	Sai, Se, Si, Sir, Su	Lhu, Si	Su	Soe	Budiman, Seinal, Suganda, Sutrawan
司徒 (Sītú)	Situ, Sirto, Suto	Lhuhu, Sitou	Suthu	Seto, Sieto, Soeto, Suto	Lutansito, Sihu, Suhu, Suhuyanli, Sitou, Szeto, Yosito
蘇 (Sū)	So, Sou	Lhu, Sou	Su	So, Soe, Sou, Souw, Su	Anastasia, Budiarso, Sofia, Sofian (Sofyan), Solihin, Sosro, Sosrojoyo, Sudargo, Sudarto, Suganda, Suhadi, Suhandinata, Suhendra, Suker, Sukoco, Sunardi, Suriarti, Surya, Suryo, Susanto, Sutini, Suwarno, Suwandi, Suyoso
孫 (Sūn)	Seng, Sng, Suin, Sun, Sung	Lhun, Syun	Sun	Sng, Soen, Sun	Sunardi, Sunarto, Sundoro, Sunjoyo, Sungkono, Sunny, Sunur, Suwandi, Suwendi, Wijaya
譚 (Tán)	Tam, Tan, Tham	Ham, Taam	Tam, Tham	Ham, Tham	Hamdani, Tabaluyan, Tamin, Tamira, Wisaksana
湯 (Tāng)	Teng, Thng, Thong	Hong, Tong	Thong	Thng, Thoeng, Thung	Arief, Haliman, Tatang, Tirtawijaya, Tungka
唐 (Táng)	Deng, Tang, Thang, Tng, Tong	Hong, Tong	Thong	Teng, Thong, Tng, Tong	Motet, Sucipto, Tenggara
滕 (Téng)	Teng	Tang	Thin	Teng, Thang, Theng, Tng	Hardi, Nangoi, Tangkau, Temenggung
田 (Tián)	Tian, Tiang, Tieng	Hen, Tin	Tien, Thien	Thien	Setiandi
塗 (Tú)	To, Tho, Tu, Tou	Tou	Do	Tho, Thou, Thouw	Thosatria
汪 (Wāng)	Ong, Uang	Wong	Vong	Ang, Hong, Oei, Ong, Wang, Wee, Wong	Am, Baguna, Bonggo, Bunandi, Darmadi, Darmansyah, Dharmawangsa, Enggano, Esmara, Gosal, Hamid, Haditono, Himawan, Husni, Kurniawan, Laongan, Lembong, Mranata, Nawangwulan, Onggara, Onggano, Onggo, Onggowarsito, Ongkawati, Ongko, Ongkovikjoyo, Ongkosanjoyo, Ongkowijaya, Ony, Otong, Pranata, Priyatno, Raja, Raharja, Rahmanata, Rompas, Rusli, Rusmawan, Sasongko, Setiawan, Sindhunatha, Surianto, Sumitro, Surya, Susanti, Sutyanto, Suwanda, Suwandi, Triyono, Wangsa, Wangsadinata, Wangsaputra, Waskito, Wijaya, Wiranata, Wongkar, Wongso, Wongsojoyo, Wongsoseputra, Wongsowinoto
王 (Wáng)	Heng, Ng, Ong, Uang	Wung, Wong	Vong	Ang, Hong, Oei, Ong, Wang, Wee, Wong	
魏 (Wèi)	Ghui, Gui, Ngui	Ngai	Ngui	Goei, Goey, Gui, Ngoei, Wei, Wi	Anton, Budikusuma, Elka, Gunardi, Gunawan, Hartono, Wibisono, Wijaya, Wiratama
溫 (Wēn)	Un, Ung	Vun, Wan	Vun	Boen, Oen, Ung, Wen, Woen, Wun	Basirun, Benjamin, Budiman, Budiono, Bunaidi, Bunawan, Bunda, Bunjamin, Bunyamin, Buntara, Buntaran, Darmohusodo, Elkana, Gunawan, Lukman, Pujiwati, Purnomo, Setiawan, Sulaksono, Suharjo, Suwandi, Suwargana, Tahrir, Unang, Untoro, Utomo, Wiguna, Wendi, Wenkiriwang, Yanto, Yuliani
翁 (Wēng)	Ang, Eng, Ong	Jung, Yuung	Vung	Ang	Antonio, Kristianto, Suroso
烏, 鄔 (Wū)	O, Ou, U	Wu	Vu	Go, Goh, Gou, Gouw, Gu, Ing, Kho, Khoe, Ko, Koh, Ng, Wou, Wu	Anggo, Angkosubroto, Bagio, Bagus, Budiono, Dirgagunarsa, Dumpapa, Ganjar, Gautama, Gianto, Geniusaharja, Gomarga, Gondasetra, Gondo, Gondokusumo, Gondowijoyo, Gono, Gossidhy, Gotama, Govino, Gowi, Gozal, Gozali, Gunadi, Gunardi, Gunarsa, Gunawan, Halim, Harjonagoro, Hartono, Husien, Japri, Kusuma, Lunandi, Margono, Mergonoto, Masrini, Mulyo, Nadesul, Purnomo, Prayogo, Sasongko, Setiady, Subroto, Sudargo, Sudirgo, Sugondo, Sumargo, Suryo, Susanto, Sutedy, Unggul, Utama, Widargo, Wuraingan, Wurianto, Yoga
吳 (Wú)	Ghou, Go, Ngo	M, Ng	Ng	Go, Goh, Gou, Gouw, Gu, Ing, Kho, Khoe, Ko, Koh, Ng, Wou, Wu	
伍, 仵 (Wǔ)	Go, Ngo, Ngou	M, Ng	Ng	Go, Goh, Gou, Gouw, Gu, Ing, Kho, Khoe, Ko, Koh, Ng, Wou, Wu	
武 (Wǔ)	Bhu, Bu	Mou, Mu	Vu	Go, Goh, Gou, Gouw, Gu, Ing, Kho, Khoe, Ko, Koh, Ng, Wou, Wu	
蕭 (Xiāo)	Siao, Siau, Sio, Siou	Lhiau, Siu	Seu	Siao, Siauw, Sieuw, Sio	Guinata, Santoso, Saputra, Sugiharto, Suwahyu, Swastika, Wijaya
謝 (Xiè)	Chia, Sia, Zia	Die, Ze	Chhia	Che, Cia, Shia, Sie, Thia, Tjhia, Tjia, Tjie	Cahya, Cahyadi, Cahyana, Cahyono, Ciasmanto, Ciawi, Ciawijaya, Chandra, Gunawan, Hidayat, Indriatno, Jaya, Muliawan, Sanjaya, Sakti, Setiawan, Shiajaya, Siady, Sidik, Sinar, Sindoro, Sito, Sudarmadi, Sudarso, Suryajaya, Sugiarto, Sukri, Syaf, Syahir, Syarif, Syaril
幸 (Xìng)	Heng	Hang	Hen	Hen	Husada
向 (Xiàng)	An, Ng, Hian, Hiang, Hiong	Hoeng	Hiong	Hiang, Ng	Hartono
熊 (Xióng)	Him, Hing, Hiong	Hung	Yung	Hiem, Him	Hartono, Yusuf
徐 (Xú)	Ce, Chhi, Si, Sir, Su	Ceoi, Tui	Chhì	Chee, Chi, Djie, Hsu, Shui, Swie, Tjhie, Tjie	Bunarso, Ciputra, Hartawan, Hijaya, Jiono, Kuswandi, Lusi, Lydia, Santosa, Tilaar,
許 (Xǔ)	He, Hi, Hir, Hu, Kho, Khu, Kou	Heoi, Hui	Hi	Che, Hie, Hoei, Hoey, Kho, Khou, Khouw, Khu, Ko, Kon, Kow, Tji	Christiaji, Darmaji, Darmono, Hakim, Hamdani, Hidayat, Kahono, Karmawan, Kartasasmita, Kartika, Kholil, Kodinata, Komar, Komara, Komarudin, Kosasih (Khosasih), Kowara, Kumala, Kumarga, Kurnia, Kurniadi, Kurniawan, Kusika, Kusnadi, Kusno, Kusuma, Kusumo, Kuswandi, Mulyadi, Permana, Setiawan, Setiono, Srimulat, Sukowati, Sulaiman, Sulendro, Sunarko, Suripto
薛 (Xuē)	Siat, Sih	Sit	Siet	Sie, Siek, Siq	Sidharta, Sindawati, Wilamarta
閻 (Yán)	Giam, Iam, Ngiam	Jim	Ngiam	Gan, Giam, Ian, Ien, Jan	Ganda, Gani, Ganiawi, Ganwarin, Giamarta, Hartono, Jimarta, Sugiamwinata, Sugihartono, Suhadi, Sukoco
顏 (Yán)	Gan, Hian, Ngang, Nguang, Ngueng	Ngaan, Ngan	Ngian, Ngien	Gan, Giam, Ian, Ien, Jan	Ganda, Gani, Ganiawi, Ganwarin, Giamarta, Hartono, Jimarta, Sugiamwinata, Sugihartono, Suhadi, Sukoco
楊 (Yáng)	Chhion, Chhiu, Chiiun, Iang, Ien, Ion, Iong, Iun	Joeng, Yiang	Yong	Iu, Jo, Jouw, Ki, Nio, Njio, Njoo, Nyo, Nyoo, Yno, Yo, Yoe	Anwar, Dharmanandi, Handoko, Inyo, Irawady, Kasman, Kusbianto, Kustiono, Laksmono, Landewati, Mulyoto, Naga, Nyoto, Renata, Sanyoto, Senjaya, Setyadi, Sudarso, Sudhamek, Sugondo, Sukandinata, Sunaryo, Sunyoto, Suryani, Suryawan, Sutaryo, Tannos, Tindo, Tirta, Wiharjo, Yohan, Yohana, Yokowijaya, Yongki, Yorensin, Yosadi, Yoso, Yuda, Yuwana, Yuwono
姚 (Yáo)	Iau, Ie, Io	Jiu	Yeu	Iau, Jaouw, Jauw, Yao, Yauw	Handoko, Jayanto, Jayawan, Yuswanto
葉 (Yè)	Iab, Iag, Iap	Jip, Yiap	Yap	Ijap, Jap, Jip, Yap, Yip	Effendi, Ertanto, Haryanto, Hendrawan, Husodo, Jamin, Japri Joyo, Laksana, Meliana, Riand, Prananto, Prawirohusodo, Wijaya, Suparno, Supit, Suyapto, Toyib (Toyip), Yananto, Yapar, Yapari, Yapardi, Yapina, Yapip, Yappy, Yaputra, Yektiurip, Yipman
易 (Yì)	Eg, Ek, Iah, Iak	Jik, Yet	Yit	Ek	Rahmani
尤 (Yóu)	Iu	Jau	Yu	Jioe, Joe, Yiu, Yoe, Yu	Buntoro, Kurniadi, Yules, Yusuf, Yuwono
遊, 㳺 (Yóu)	Iu	Jau, Yiu	Yu	Jioe, Joe, Yiu, Yoe, Yu	Buntoro, Kurniadi, Yules, Yusuf, Yuwono
餘 (Yú)	E, I, Ir, U	Jyu, Yi	Yi	Ie, Ji, Jie	Halim, Ibrahim, Ikhwan, Iman, Iskandar, Jafar, Jita, Juslim, Sumbaji, Susanto, Sutarji, Sutowijoyo
俞 (Yú)	Ju, Lu	Jyu	Yi	Djie, Ie, Joe	Dawis, Irawan, Lukito, Suji
曾 (Zēng)	Chan, Cheng, Chng, Zang, Zeng	Dang, Zeng	Chen	Can, Chan, Tjan, Tjen, Tjin	Candiluhur, Chandra, Chandrakusuma, Chandrasaputra, Chandrawinata, Januar, Negara, Warsono, Silalahi, Sudharmono
詹 (Zhān)	Chiam, Ziam	Zim	Cham	Chan, Ciam, Tjam, Tjiam	Camar, Ciampea
張 (Zhāng)	Tiang, Tiaun, Tiong, Tion, Tiun, Ziang	Ziang, Zoeng	Chong	Teh, Teo, Theo, Thio, Tio, Tjo, Tjang, Tjiong, Tjon, Tjong	Basri, Canggih, Chandra, Hadisaputro, Hidayat, Irawan, Jaya, Johan, Kartio, Kuswati, Mukianto, Natio, Pambudi, Prasetya, Prasetyo (Prasetio), Sajiono, Sanusi, Santosa, Santyoso, Setiadi, Setiawan, Setio, Setiono, Sigianto, Sudarso, Sujino, Sukamto, Sulistio (Sulistiyo), Susantio (Susantyo), Susetio (Susetyo, Susetiyo), Suwondo, Suteja, Sutiono, Tania, Theodora, Tyos, Wijayakusuma
鄭 (Zhèng)	Den, Teng, Ten, Tin	Zeng, Ziang	Chhang	Djen, Te, The, Thie, Tjen, Tjeng	Budiono, Cokroraharjo, Cokrowijokso, Darmaputra, Hartanto, Hasan, Herabadi, Idris, Jinarakhita, Kharisma, Liyanti, Menaro, Nusantara, Subiantoro, Sufida, Suryani, Suteja, Tahyar, Teddy, Tedyono, Teguh, Teja, Tejakusmana, Tejamulia, Tejarukmana, Tejawati, Tejokumoro, Tejokusuma, Tejosuwito, Tony, Wibisono
鐘 (Zhōng)	Cheng, Chiong, Zeng	Zung, Zuung	Chung	Tjoeng, Tjiong	Arsajaya, Chandra, Cundiawan, Cungandi, Cungkoro, Hadijaya, Purnama, Thamrin, Theodora
週 (Zhōu)	Chiu, Ziu	Zau, Ziu	Chu	Ciu, Djioe, Tjio, Tjioe, Tjoe, Tjiu	Binsar, Cahyadin, Ciuwandi, Ciwijaya, Cokroraharjo, Cokrowardoyo, Cokrowijokso, Frans, Gimin, Harto, Hartanto, Hidayat, Johari, Juanda , Juanita, Juano, Kusumanegara, Mulyono, Prajoko, Prasetio, Sastrowiharjo, Surikin, Sucipto, Sugiono, Trismitro, Yuanita
朱 (Zhū)	Chu, Zu	Zi, Zyu	Chu	Cu, Chu, Tjoa, Tjoe, Tju	Joyonegoro, Jugito, Jumena, Juwinata, Sutrisno, Yusuf, Zulfikar, Zulfikri, Zuneng
莊 (Zhuāng)	Chng, Choang, Chon, Chong, Zang, Zeng, Zuang	Zong	Chong	Chuang, Cng, Tjhung, Tjuang, Tjung	Budiman, Dozan, Johan, Juanda, Juandi, Mercubuwono
卓 (Zhuó)	Doh, Toh, Tok	Coek, Zoek	Chok	Tjoek, Toh	Harsono
鄒 (Zōu)	Chau, Zou	Zau	Cheu	Tjee, Tjeuw, Tjoo, Tjouw	Cakra, Murdaya

== See also ==
- Chinese Indonesians
- Indonesian names
- Surnames by country#Indonesia
- List of common Chinese surnames
- Legislation on Chinese Indonesians
- Sōshi-kaimei for Japanese policy on Korean names during Japan's occupation of Korea
- Filipino-Chinese surname, for a similar phenomenon of surname localisation
