= Discrimination against Chinese Indonesians =

Racism and discrimination against a minority population

Discrimination against people of Chinese descent in Indonesia has been carried out since the time of the Dutch East India Company. Serious violence against Chinese people has occurred at irregular intervals since 1740, when the soldiers of the Dutch East India Company and other ethnic groups from Batavia killed up to 10,000 people of Chinese descent during the Chinezenmoord. The worst outbreaks took place in 1946-49 during the Indonesian National Revolution against Dutch rule. There were significant outbreaks in the early 1960s. Violence against Chinese also took place in 1965 after the failed coup attempt during anti-communist purges, though the main targets of the killings were Native Indonesian communists. In May 1998, many Chinese businesses were burned down and many Chinese girls and women were raped and murdered.

== Forms ==
=== Violence ===
Violence against Chinese Indonesians generally consists of attacks on property, including factories and shops. However, killings and assaults have happened, including in Batavia in 1740, Tangerang in 1946, during the period after the 30 September Movement of 1965, and during the May 1998 riots.

Some observers suggest that Chinese Indonesians have become "the typical scapegoat" in situations where widespread discontent and social unrest becomes violent. The scapegoating has become more pronounced during the period since Indonesia's independence.

=== Language ===
Terms considered disparaging against Chinese Indonesians have entered common Indonesian usage, at both the regional and national levels. The term Cina, the use of which was mandated in 1967 instead of the then-commonly used Tionghoa, was perceived as having similar negative connotations to Inlander for Native Indonesians. The term Tionghoa began to be used again after the beginning of Reformation, but by then Cina was not considered negative by the younger generation of Chinese Indonesians.

In different regions different terms have come into use that reflect common stereotypes. The following examples are from Surakarta.

Original	Translation	Meaning
Porsi Cina	Chinese portion	The largest portion of food
Mambu Cina	Smelling of the Chinese	Newly purchased items
Tangisan Cina	Chinese tears	Mourning cry

=== Legislation ===
After the end of Company rule and the introduction of metropolitan colonial rule in 1815, legislation was introduced specifically against Chinese Indonesians. One of the first was in 1816 and required ethnic Chinese to carry a special pass at all times.

During the Sukarno regime in 1958, all Chinese Indonesians were required to state their intent to stay Indonesian citizens (Note: Law Number 62 of 1958 (text in Indonesian)) and in 1959 Chinese who were not citizens were forbidden from doing business outside of urban areas. (Note: Presidential Regulation 10 of 1959 (text in Indonesian), which required all foreign national-owned businesses to be located in urban areas. Due to uncertainty relating to the status of Chinese Indonesians, they were included as foreign nationals as well. See Setiono 2008, pp. 811–815.) The discrimination continued into the New Order. Chinese Indonesians were urged to choose Indonesian-sounding names, (Note: Cabinet Presidium Decision 127 of 1966 (text in Indonesian).) forbidden to practice their traditions publicly, (Note: Presidential Instruction 14 of 1967 (text in Indonesian).) and required to obtain extra proof of citizenship. In total, forty five directly or indirectly discriminatory laws were passed during the New Order. Although the majority of this legislation was rescinded during the presidencies of Abdurrahman Wahid and Megawati Sukarnoputri, instances of enforcement continued.

== History ==
=== Background ===
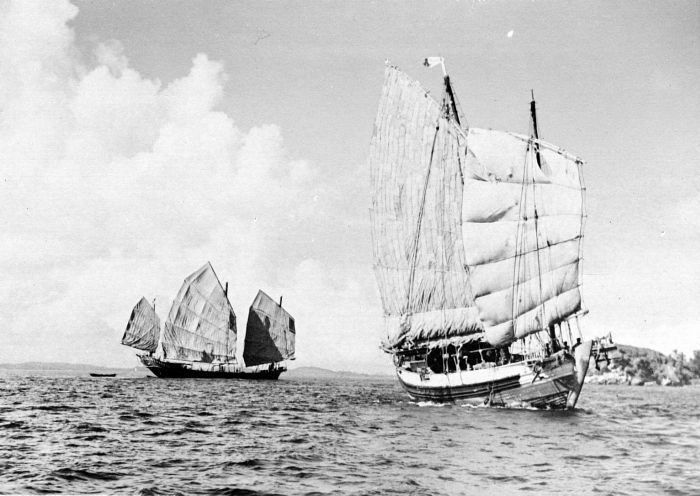
Chinese junks Sin Tong Heng and Tek Hwa Seng in the Singapore Strait, c. 1936

Based on Chinese artifacts found in Indonesia, China is thought to have had trading relations with the Indonesian archipelago since the first century B.C. However, the first recorded movement of people from China into the Maritime Southeast Asia was the arrival of Mongol forces under Kublai Khan that culminated in the Mongol invasion of Java in 1293. The Mongols introduced Chinese technology to the island, particularly shipbuilding and Ancient Chinese coinage. Their intervention also hastened the decline of the classical kingdoms and precipitated the rise of the Majapahit empire.

Later, Chinese Muslim traders from the eastern coast of China arrived at the coastal towns of Indonesia and Malaysia in the early 15th century. They were led by the mariner Zheng He, who led several expeditions to southeastern Asia between 1405 and 1430. These traders settled along the northern coast of Java, but there is no further documentation of their settlements beyond the 16th century. Scholars believe that the Chinese Muslims became absorbed into the majority Muslim population, until no Chinese communities remained when the Dutch arrived. Trade from China was re-established when it legalised private trade in 1567 and began licensing 50 junks a year. Distinct Chinese colonies emerged in ports throughout the archipelago, including the pepper port of Banten.

=== Colonial era ===
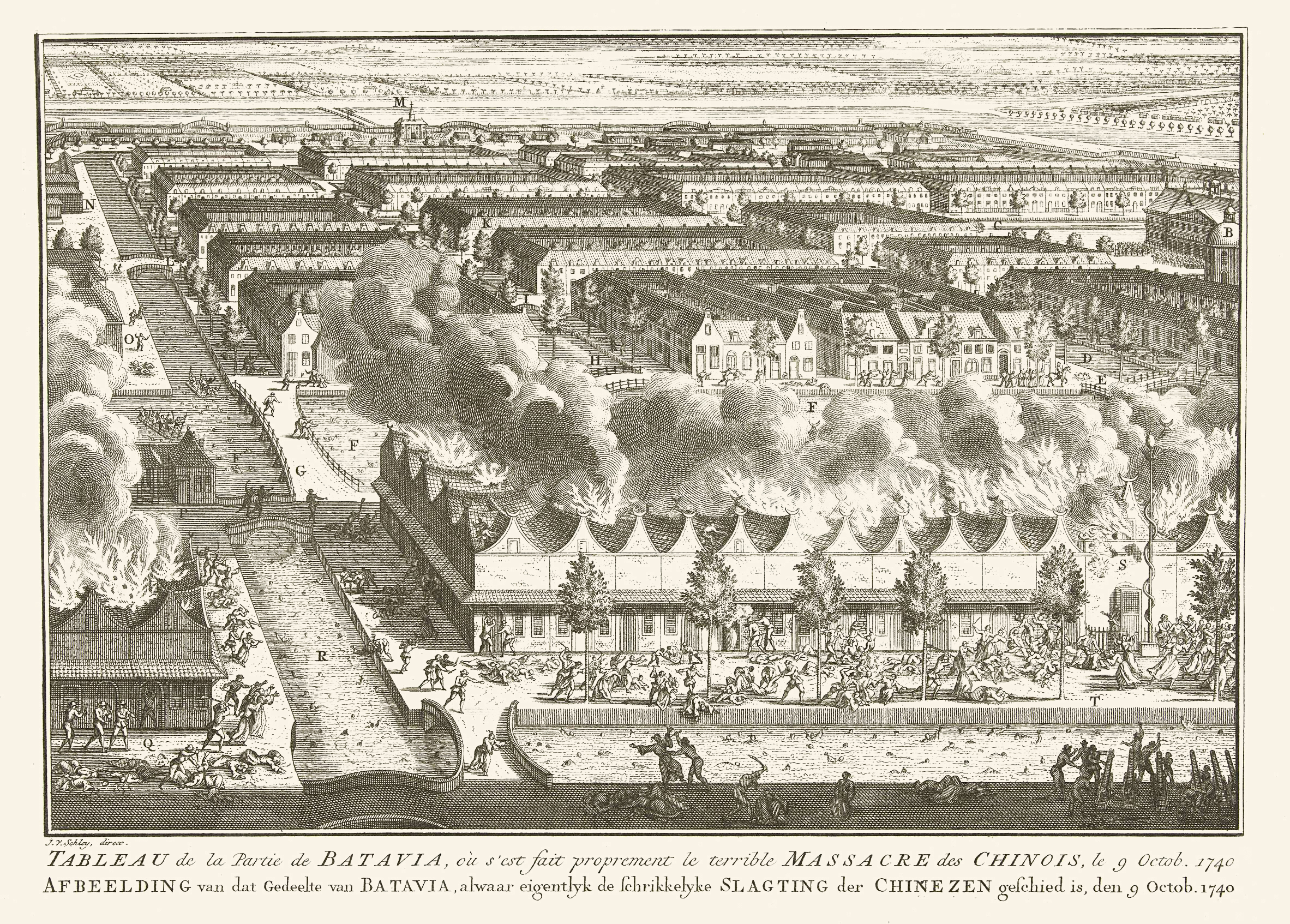
Chinese-owned houses were burned, while bodies were dumped into rivers and canals

By 1740, there were over 2,500 Chinese-owned houses within the Batavia city walls, with another 15,000 individuals living outside of the city limits. The Dutch colonials required them to carry registration papers, and those who did not comply were deported to China. After an outbreak of malaria killed thousands in the 1730s, including the Governor-General of the Dutch East Indies, Dirck van Cloon, the deportation policy was tightened. According to Indonesian historian Benny G. Setiono, the outbreak was followed by increased suspicion and resentment in native Indonesians and the Dutch toward the ethnic Chinese, who were growing in number and whose wealth was increasingly visible. As a result, Commissioner of Native Affairs Roy Ferdinand, under orders of Governor-General Adriaan Valckenier, decreed on 25 July 1740 that Chinese considered suspicious would be deported to Ceylon (modern day Sri Lanka) to harvest cinnamon. Wealthy Chinese were extorted by corrupt Dutch officials who threatened them with deportation; There were also rumours that deportees were not taken to their destinations but were thrown overboard once out of sight of Java, and in some accounts, they died when rioting on the ships.

As the situation became tenser, Governor General Adriaan Valckenier held an emergency plenary session and reinforced the guard. On 7 October 1740, a group of hundreds of Chinese Indonesians attacked a Dutch stronghold in Tanah Abang, killing 50. In response, a troop of 1,800 Company soldiers led by Gustaaf Willem van Imhoff, together with militia (Dutch: schutterij) and conscripts (Dutch: pennist), came to crush the revolt. The following day the Dutch repelled an attack by up to 10,000 ethnic Chinese, led by groups from nearby Tangerang and Bekasi, at the city's outer walls. 1,789 Chinese were reported to have died in this attack. Meanwhile, rumours spread among the other ethnic groups in Batavia, including slaves from Bali and Sulawesi, Bugis, and Balinese troops, that the Chinese were plotting to kill, rape, or enslave them. These groups pre-emptively burned houses belonging to ethnic Chinese along Besar River. The Dutch followed this with an assault on Chinese settlements elsewhere in Batavia in which they burned houses and killed people. For two weeks, the troops burned Chinese-owned houses and stores, killing ethnic Chinese and dumping their bodies in the Ciliwung River. Eventually an estimated 10,000 were killed in the 1740 Batavia massacre, including 500 prisoners and hospital patients. The surviving Chinese Indonesians in Batavia were moved to an area outside of the wall, in what is now Glodok. This was later applied to other cities, where Chinatowns (Indonesian: Pecinan) were built to segregate the Chinese and other ethnic groups. The event triggered a two-year war, in which Chinese and Javanese soldiers fought side by side.

When the VOC was nationalised on 31 December 1799, the freedoms the Chinese experienced under the corporation were taken away by the Dutch government. An 1816 regulation introduced a requirement for the indigenous population and Chinese travelling within the territory to obtain a travel permit. Those who did not carry a permit risked being arrested by security officers. The Governor-General also introduced a resolution in 1825 which forbade "foreign Asians" from living within the same neighbourhood as the native population.

During the Java War, thousands of Chinese Indonesians were killed by Prince Diponegoro's forces during raids on the southern coast of Java. Survivors fled to the northern coast or to Dutch settlements for protection. Setiono cites the Chinese's status as tax collectors and loan providers as a cause, as well as Diponegoro's belief that the Chinese brought bad luck upon his campaign.

In 1848, the Dutch colonial government enacted the legislation sorting all inhabitants of the archipelago into two groups, based on whether or not they practised Christianity. This was later amended in 1855, combining Native Indonesian, Chinese, Arab, and Indian Christians with non-Christians. However, in practice the "foreign Orientals" were subject to separate regulations.

"The establishment of Sarekat Islam ... marked a watershed for ethnic Chinese in Indonesia."

— Jemma Purdey

By 1912, the Dutch government had abandoned the policy of segregation. During the same period, the Xinhai Revolution awakened Chinese nationalism in the ethnic Chinese, while Sarekat Islam worked to awaken Indonesian nationalism in the Native Indonesian populace. Tensions between Sarekat Islam and the ethnic Chinese led to racially charged riots in Surakarta (1912), Tangerang (1913), and Kudus (31 October 1918). Of these, the largest was the Kudus riot, where a group of rioters burned and looted forty houses and numerous Chinese temples. At least 16 were killed in the riots.

=== Japanese occupation and National Revolution (1942–1949) ===
After the Japanese occupied Indonesia in 1942, at least 542 ethnic Chinese from Java and Madura were arrested and detained in the Cimahi concentration camp; this group included leaders, spouses of Europeans, and Chinese who were legally considered Europeans. Chinese organisations were disbanded and banned. Not long afterwards, ethnic Chinese were required to register themselves and pledge their allegiance to the Japanese army. Despite Japanese attempts to quell dissent, there were several underground resistance movements led by ethnic Chinese.

This was followed by the Pontianak incident in October 1943. Over 1,500 people were arrested or killed by the Japanese occupying forces in an attempt to prevent a multi-ethnic rebellion. Ethnic Chinese were the largest single group targeted, with 854 killed in the affair.

From 30 May to 4 June 1946, attacks from Indonesian independence fighters killed 653 Chinese Indonesians. Roughly a thousand Chinese Indonesian-owned homes were burned; Mely G. Tan notes this as the worst of the violence targeted at Chinese Indonesians during the war. More cases were reported in Karawaci, Bayur, and Bagansiapiapi.

As the Dutch implemented a war of attrition and scorch earth, they forced Chinese on Java to flee inland and the Dutch destroyed all important assets including Chinese factories and property. Local Indonesians joined in on the Dutch violence against the Chinese looting Chinese property and trying to attack Chinese. However, when the Japanese troops landed and seized control of Java from the Dutch, to people's surprise, the Japanese forced the native Indonesians to stop looting and attacking Chinese and warned the Indonesians they would not tolerate anti-Chinese violence in Java. The Japanese viewed the Chinese in Java and their economic power specifically as important and vital to Japanese war effort so they did not physically harm the Chinese of Java with no execution or torture of Chinese taking place unlike in other places. There was no violent confrontation between Japanese and Chinese on Java, unlike in British Malaya. The Japanese also allowed Chinese of Java in the Federation of Overseas-Chinese Associations (Hua Chiao Tsung Hui) to form the Keibotai, their own armed Chinese defence corps for protection with Japanese military instructors training them how to shoot and use spears. The Chinese viewed this as important to defending themselves from local Indonesians. The majority of Chinese of Java did not die in the war. It was only after the war ended when Japanese control fell and then the native Indonesians again started attacks against the Chinese of Java when the Japanese were unable to protect them.

In Java, the Japanese heavily recruited Javanese girls as comfort women and brought them to New Guinea, Malaysia, Thailand and other areas foreign to Indonesia besides using them in Java itself. The Japanese brought Javanese women as comfort women to Buru island, and Kalimantan. The Japanese recruited help from local collaborator police of all ethnicities to recruit Javanese girls, with one account accusing Chinese recruiters of tricking a Javanese regent into sending good Javanese girls into prostitution for the Japanese in May 1942. The Japanese also lied to the Javanese telling them that their girls would become waitresses and actresses when recruiting them. The Japanese brought Javanese women as comfort women prostitutes to Kupang in Timor while in East Timor the Japanese took local women in Dili. In Bali, the Japanese sexually harassed Balinese women when they came and started forcing Balinese women into brothels for prostitution, with Balinese men and Chinese men used as recruiters for the Balinese women. All of the brothels in Bali were staffed by Balinese women. In brothels in Kalimantan, native Indonesian women made up 80% of the prostitutes. Javanese girls and local girls were used in a Japanese brothel in Ambon in Batu Gantung. European Dutch women were overrepresented in documents on Dutch East Indies comfort women which didn't reflect the actual reality because the Dutch did not care about native Indonesian women being victimised by Japan, refusing to prosecute cases against them since Indonesia was not a UN member at the time. Javanese comfort women who were taken by Japanese to islands outside Java were treated differently depending on whether they stayed on those islands or returned to Java. Since Javanese society was sexually permissive and they kept it secret from other Javanese, the Javanese women who returned to Java fared better, but the Javanese women who stayed on the islands like Buru were treated harsher by their hosts since they locals in Buru were more patriarchal. The Japanese murdered Christians and forced girls into prostitution in Timor and Sumba, desecrating sacred vessels and vestments in churches and using the churches as brothels. Javanese girls were brought as prostitutes by the Japanese to Flores and Buru. Eurasians, Indians, Chinese, Dutch, Menadonese, Bataks, Bugis, Dayaks, Javanese, Arabs and Malays were arrested and massacred in the Mandor affair.

=== Guided Democracy (1949–1966) ===
Sukarno's government enacted legislation limiting Chinese Indonesians' trading rights

In 1955, Zhou Enlai declared that Chinese citizenship was jus sanguinis. This led to a treaty between China and Indonesia regarding the legal status of Chinese Indonesians, which formed the basis for the Citizenship Law of 1958. This law required all Chinese Indonesians to choose between Chinese and Indonesian citizenship, making a statement at the nearest district court. Approximately 390,000 ethnic Chinese rejected Chinese citizenship.

In May 1959, the Sukarno government passed legislation revoking the trading rights of foreign nationals in rural areas; this was based on two previous, lower-level legislations. Due to uncertainty relating to the legal status of the ethnic Chinese, they were included as well. This led to the exodus of between 102,000 and 136,000 Chinese Indonesians, who left for China on ships sent by the Chinese government.

Between 1963 and early 1965, the situation for Chinese Indonesians generally became more stable. Numerous Chinese-language schools were opened and Chinese-language press flourished. However, there were still minor attacks on Chinese Indonesians in Cirebon, Sukabumi, and Bandung in 1963.

=== New Order (1966–1998) ===
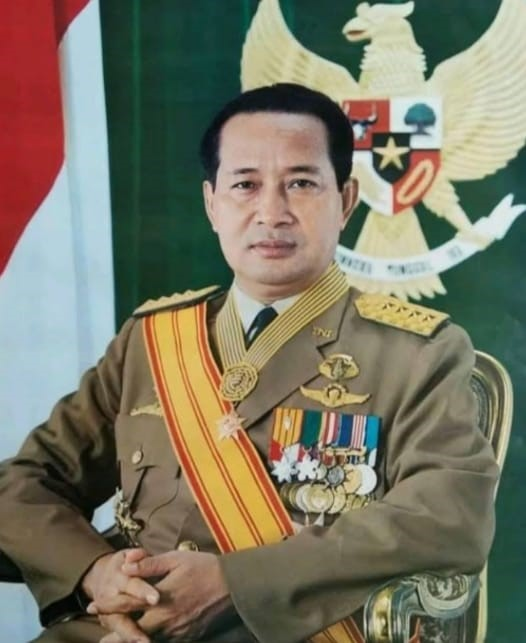
Suharto's reign forced Chinese Indonesians to abandon their heritage, especially in naming and language

During the riots following the failed coup on 30 September, Chinese Indonesians were sometimes targeted. Because most violence was against members and associates of the Indonesian Communist Party, to which very few Chinese belonged, it is likely that much of this violence was opportunistic, rather than due to suspected ties to the Communist Party. The best estimate is that thousands of Chinese Indonesians were killed (out of a total death toll of 500,000), with documented massacres taking place in Makassar and Medan and on the island of Lombok. In West Kalimantan, approximately eighteen months after the worst of the killings in Java, the indigenous Dayak people expelled 45,000 ethnic Chinese from rural areas, killing up to 5,000. The Chinese refused to fight back, since they considered themselves "a guest on other people's land" with the intention of trading only.

"The history of the ethnic Chinese during the Suharto regime can indeed be described as the history of a minority ethnic group that had no choice but to comply with the policies applied to them."

— Mely G. Tan

During the same period, numerous discriminating laws were passed. In April 1966, all Chinese schools (at the time numbering 629) were closed. On 8 May 1966, Territorial Military Commander of Aceh Ishak Djuarsa declared that all ethnic Chinese had to leave Aceh prior to 17 August 1966; this was followed by a similar decree by the North Sumatra government. In 1967, the usage of the term Cina, considered disparaging, became mandated for all official communications. Furthermore, to promote assimilation of the influential Chinese Indonesians, the Suharto government passed several laws as part of so-called "Basic Policy for the Solution of Chinese Problem", whereby only one Chinese-language publication – controlled by the Army – was allowed to continue, all Chinese cultural and religious expressions (including display of Chinese characters) were prohibited from public space, and the ethnic-Chinese were forced to take-up Indonesian-sounding names; creating a systematic cultural genocide.

On 5 August 1973, a riot in Bandung, West Java, caused by three Chinese Indonesian teenagers beating another driver to death after a minor traffic accident, led to the looting and destruction of more than 1,500 Chinese Indonesian-owned shops and houses. The riots were not stopped by the local military; and nineteen soldiers were arrested for participating in the riots. The riots were later blamed on an underground section of the PKI.

On 15 January 1974, student demonstrations against corruption, foreign investment, and President Suharto's clique of personal assistants were diverted by suspected Special Forces provocateurs into a full riot, and later an anti-Chinese Indonesian pogrom. Stores in Glodok, owned by ethnic Chinese, were looted and burned; the largest of these was the Senen shopping complex. The security forces did almost nothing to stop the looting. The demonstrations and their aftermath came to be known as the Malari incident.

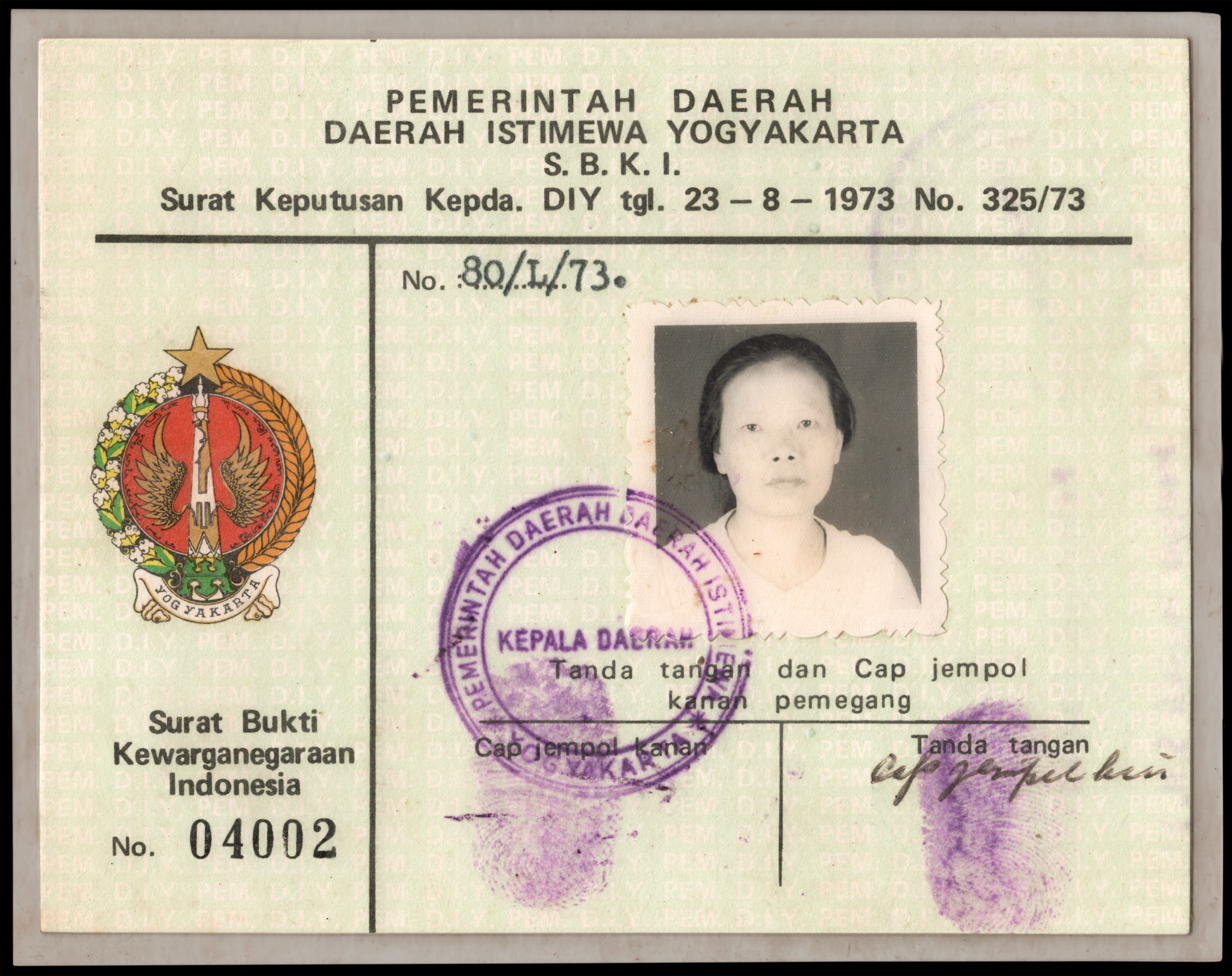
An early SBKRI

In 1978, the government began requiring a Letter of Proof of Citizenship of the Republic of Indonesia (Indonesian: Surat Bukti Kewarganegaraan Republik Indonesia, or SBKRI). Although the SBKRI was legally required for all citizens of foreign descent, in practice it was generally applied to the Chinese. This led to difficulties for Chinese Indonesians when enrolling in state universities, applying to be civil servants, or joining the military or police.

Suharto's economic programs continued to work, with Indonesia experiencing an economic boom with its Gross Domestic Product growing at a rate of 8 per cent in 1996, led by the manufacturing sector. However, the Asian Financial Crisis caused the rupiah to collapse and economic growth slowed to 1.4 per cent in the fourth quarter. Unable to stabilise the economy, the government sought assistance from the International Monetary Fund. With rising unemployment and inflated food prices, the public lost confidence in the government's ability to turn the economy around. By the beginning of May 1998, students had been demonstrating in campuses throughout Medan for nearly two months. The growing number of demonstrators was coupled with increasing calls from the public for overall reforms.

On 4 May, more than 500 protestors from the Institute of Teacher Training and Education of Medan (IKIP Medan) were barricaded and allegedly had Molotov cocktails thrown at them. Eventually, police reportedly stopped a group of students and assaulted them. Word of this attack spread through several witnesses, and a large group later attacked and destroyed a traffic police post. When more officers arrived to confront the group, the station was attacked. Not long after, shops owned by Chinese Indonesians were looted, while they reportedly left those marked with the words "milik pribumi" (owned by the indigenous pribumi) in graffiti alone. When the Mobile Brigade arrived in the afternoon, the crowd was dispersed with tear gas. As businesses in Medan closed on the following day, thousands of people attacked markets throughout the city and its surrounding districts. Police and anti-riot soldiers fired rubber bullets at the crowd to disperse them but were unsuccessful. When the violence ended two days later, six people had died and one hundred were injured.

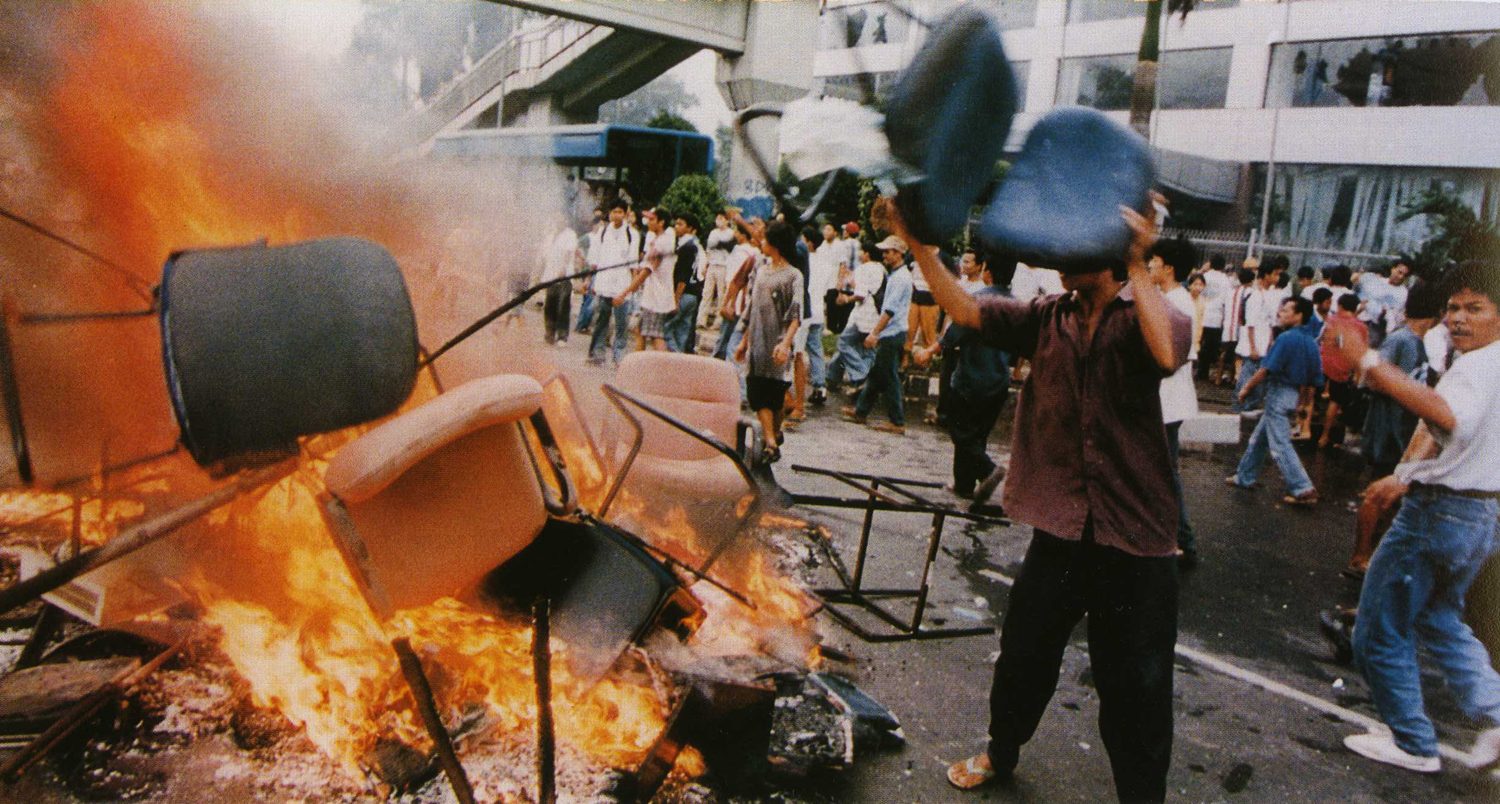
Many homes and businesses owned by ethnic Chinese in Jakarta were looted and burned in the riots.

On 12 May, less than a week after the violence in Medan subsided, the police shot four protesting students. Mass violence began almost simultaneously throughout Jakarta the following day. Mobs also attacked Glodok in the northwestern part of the city, where the commercial area of Jakarta's Chinatown was badly damaged. Some store owners reportedly paid local thugs to protect them from the violence because security forces were largely absent. This violence spread to numerous cities throughout Indonesia on 14 and 15 May, including Surabaya, Palembang, Surakarta, and Boyolali. However, most of the people who died in the riots were the Indonesian looters who targeted the Chinese shops, not the Chinese themselves, since the looters were burnt to death in a massive fire. The incidents caused President Suharto to resign and B. J. Habibie to become President of Indonesia.

Indonesian Muslims who physically looked Chinese were attacked by rioters, despite not identifying as Chinese at all and only having one distant Chinese great-grandfather. An Indonesian Muslim woman who had 5 sons, Ruminah, mentioned she had just one Chinese grandfather who married a local Muslim woman and she did not identify as Chinese at all or speak Chinese, but she and her family were constantly harassed and hated by their neighbours just for their Chinese physical looks; her hair salon was ransacked and one of her sons died in a fire at the mall during the riots.

=== Reformation (1998–present) ===
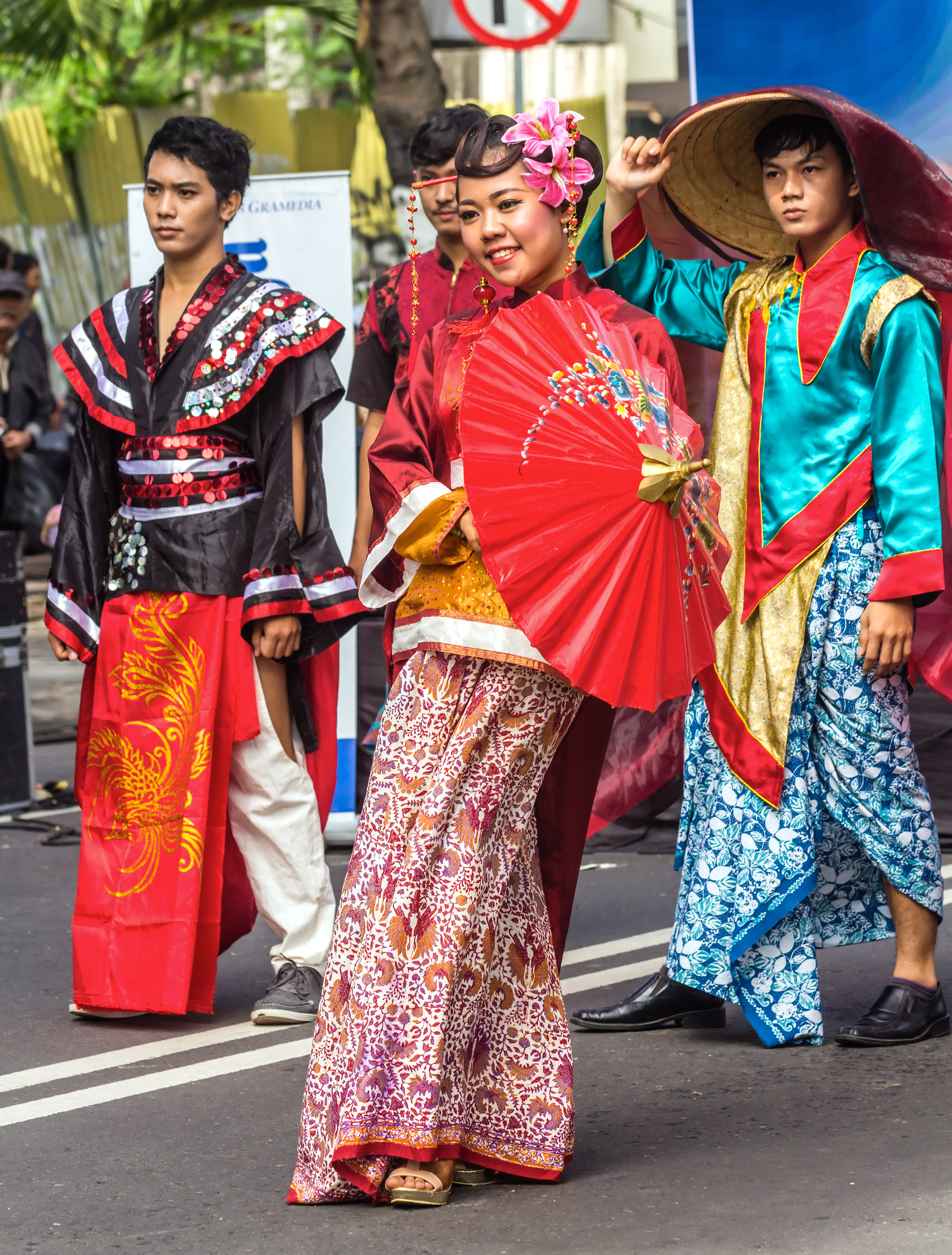
Students of Yogyakarta State University during a Chinese-Javanese fusion fashion show for Chinese New Year; the public practice of Chinese culture was permitted beginning in 2000, and Chinese New Year declared a public holiday in 2002.

After the fall of Suharto, numerous discriminative laws were repealed and others promoting unity were passed. President Habibie passed legislation requiring the elimination of the terms pribumi and non-pribumi (native Indonesian and non-native) in 1998. In 2000, the next president, Abdurrahman Wahid, recalled the legislation forbidding the practice of Chinese culture and use of Mandarin Chinese in public. In 2002, Megawati Sukarnoputri declared Chinese New Year a national holiday. However, some discriminative legislation still remains.

Under the administration of Megawati Sukarnoputri and later Joko Widodo, Chinese Indonesians have been mostly "embraced" by the government, with numerous mixed-ethnic cultural presentations and media activity. By 2004, there were three Chinese Indonesian members of the Peoples Representative Council, as well as one cabinet member. However, discrimination and prejudice still continued, especially among political conservatives and Islamists. On 15 March 2016, for instance, Indonesian Army General Surya Prabowo commented that then-incumbent governor of Jakarta, Basuki Tjahaja Purnama, should "know his place lest the Indonesian Chinese face the consequences of his action". This controversial comment was considered to hearken back to previous violence against the Indonesian Chinese.

== Causes ==
The use of Chinese Indonesians as scapegoats is partly caused by their lack of political power and government protection. The New Order policy of assimilation has also been seen as a factor; the need to assimilate the ethnic Chinese "indicated that Chinese cultural elements are unacceptable".

Discrimination, distrust, and violence against Chinese Indonesians is caused in part by a perception that they are still loyal to China, and only see Indonesia as a place to live and work. They are also seen as being "exclusive", unwilling to mingle with other ethnic groups, as well as discriminating against native Indonesians in their business relations. The Chinese Indonesians whose predominant religion is Christianity also suffers from Christophobia and persecutions.

== Effects ==
During the Old and New Orders, Chinese Indonesians generally complied with legal restrictions as best they could. However, the May 1998 riots caused a change in attitude, including greater political activity and assertiveness. Additionally, the discrimination led to an ethnic identity crisis, with Chinese Indonesians with strong Chinese ties feeling unaccepted by the Indonesian populace, and those with strong Indonesian ties wanting equal rights.

Sociologist Mely G. Tan notes that presently many Chinese Indonesian families have prepared escape plans in case of further unrest and find themselves unable to trust ethnic Indonesians. She also notes that younger Chinese Indonesians are increasingly impatient with the inability of the government and military to prevent inter-ethnic violence.

== See also ==
- China–Indonesia relations
- Anti-Chinese sentiment
- Chinese Indonesians
- Chinese Indonesian surname
- Legislation on Chinese Indonesians
- 1740 Batavia massacre
- 1918 Kudus riot
- Mergosono massacre (1947)
- Indonesian mass killings of 1965–66
- Banjarmasin riot of May 1997
- May 1998 riots of Indonesia
