= Budaya =

Cultural concept of the Malay Archipelago

Budaya derives from the Indonesian word budi (which is synonymous to akal budi or kebudayaan). The original Indonesian word is philosophical, since it has been explained, interpreted, re-interpreted, and made a philosophical discourse in Indonesian philosophers' circles up to this time. The scope of Indonesian philosophy is not considered to be complete without mentioning this discourse. Its derivatives, such as Budayawan, Budiman, and Budi daya, are now also discussed among Indonesian philosophers, especially those who are known as Philosophers of Kebudayaan.

== Early definition ==
Philosophers of the various schools of philosophy defined the word Budi (plural, Budaya) with different definitions, suited to their school interests. The oldest definition of the word is found in the 18th century Ancient Javanese manuscript Serat Centhini. According to the text, Budi is a suprahuman, spiritual entity which mediates between God's being and human's being. It is a purely spiritual substance originated from God. Here is the excerpt:

Wujud tanpa kahanan puniki.Ing dalem kak sajati lantaran. Inggih budi lantarané. Sarupa wujud ing hu. Pan jumeneng Muhammad latip. Mustakik ing Hyang Suksma. Kenyatanipun. Budi wujud ing Hyang Suksma. Inggih budi inggih Hyang kang Mahasuci. Budi tatabonira

English translation:

This being without existence is between the true reality. It has a mediation which is called Budi. Budi is similar to God's being. Budi is also called the spiritual Muhammad. It is a manifestation of the Spirit. Budi is the being of the Spirit and it is the All-Pure. Budi is its peaceful place.

It is the Budi with this meaning that is used by Dr. Wahidin Soedirohusodo to name his and his fellows' first native political society Budi Utomo in the Dutch East Indies of the early 19th century.

The Budi in this meaning is also similar to the Sufi concept of Nur Muhammad, or the Platonic concept of The Universal Soul or the Islamic philosophical concept of Al-'Aql Al-Awwal.

== Modern redefinition ==
In the 20th century, modern European learning introduced by the Portuguese-Spanish Catholics and the Dutch Protestants to Indonesian native educational institutions influenced the definition of the word Budi. In this intellectual period, Budi was re-defined and re-interpreted not as spiritual as understood before, but as human entity.

In 1961, Nicolas Drijarkara defined Budi as ethical reason or moral reason as understood by the moralist Immanuel Kant. Poedjawijatna, another philosopher, defined Budi as an Indonesian translation of the English word reason or reasoning and Filsafat Budi as the English word Logic. In the early 1970s, Ki Hajar Dewantara, a preeminent Javanese thinker, defined Budi as the matured human soul.

Sutan Takdir Alisjahbana, a great Indonesian thinker of the 20th century, defined Budi as a psychological pattern containing basic life needs, instincts, feelings, thought, passions and fantasies. Here is the excerpt in Indonesian:

Adalah pola kejiwaan yang di dalamnya terkandung dorongan-dorongan hidup yang dasar, inseting (instink), perasaan, dengan pikiran, kemauan dan fantasi yang kita namakan budi. Budi itu adalah dasar segala kehidupan kebudayaan manusia.

== Budi as culture ==
In the Indonesian history of philosophy, the philosopher who first understood Budi (or more frequently, Kebudayaan) as culture is Sutan Takdir Alisjahbana (1908–1994). Koentjaraningrat, an American-trained anthropologist, then continued using the meaning in his famous book, Manusia dan Kebudayaan di Indonesia. Sidi Gazalba, another philosopher of Kebudayaan, defined Budi or Kebudayaan as a way of life owned and held by any cultural unity.

Today's Indonesian thinkers, like Sutan Syahrir, Soedjatmoko, Dick Hartoko, Abdurrahman Wahid, Mochtar Kusumaatmaja, Mochtar Lubis, Sayidiman Suryohadiprojo, Y.B. Mangunwijaya, Nurcholish Madjid, Darmanto Jatman, and other modernists, hold this cultural-anthropological meaning of Budi. It can even be said that this meaning has been dominating the philosophical discourse of today. All philosophers holding this meaning have been acknowledged nationally as Philosophers of Kebudayaan.
