= Legislation on Chinese Indonesians =

Laws oppressing people of Chinese background

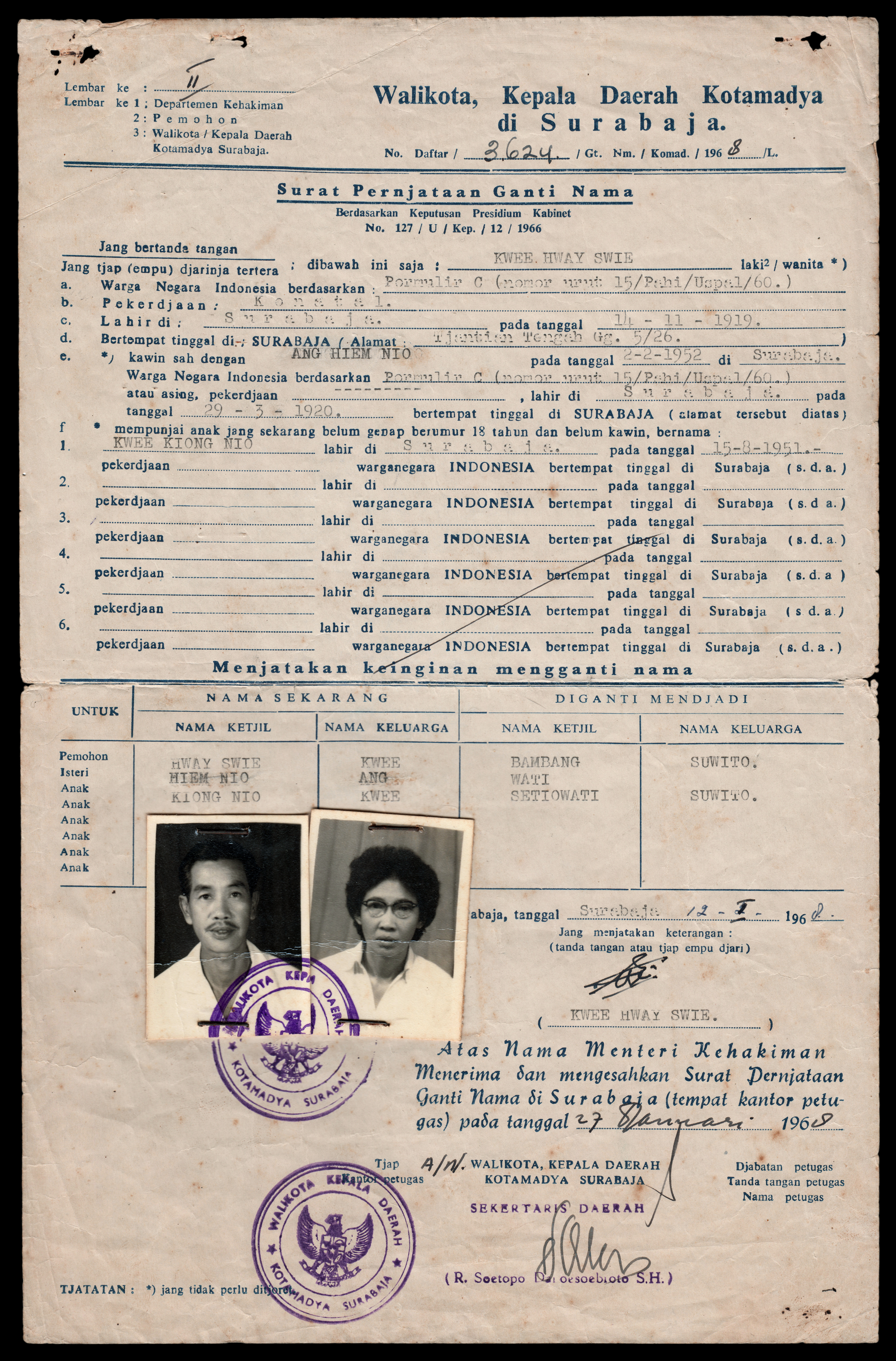
A letter requesting a name change, in accordance with Cabinet Presidium Decision 127 of 1966

The legislation on Chinese Indonesians in Indonesia was a series of discriminatory laws enacted through constitutional laws and directives by the Government of Indonesia to enforce the cultural assimilation of ethnic Chinese in Indonesia into the wider Indonesian society. This legislation primarily regulated individual naming conventions to ban Chinese names, the usage of Chinese languages, and restricted business statutes, among other mandates. These measures intensified during Suharto's New Order regime, which aimed to commit cultural genocide against the Chinese Indonesian population and forcibly assimilate them.

== 1950s ==
In the early 1950s the Government of Indonesia implemented the Benteng Program, under which only native Indonesians were allowed to have licenses to import certain items. This was to reduce the economic disparity between ordinary Indonesians and ethnic Chinese who were given racial privileges during the centuries-old Dutch colonial rule.

The program soon evolved into a colloquially term of Ali Baba, referring to symbiotic relationship between ethnic Chinese entrepreneurs and native Indonesians who benefited each other through mutual cooperation.

== Presidential Regulation 10 of 1959 ==
The Presidential Regulation 10 of 1959 was a directive prohibiting foreign nationals from doing retail business in rural areas, requiring them to either transfer ownership to Indonesian nationals by 1 January 1960 or relocate to urban cities.

This was the government's attempt to better redistribute economic commerce and trade back into the hands of majority when much of the nation's economy is run by a small, elite minority of ethnic Chinese which had near monopoly of all business transactions.

However, the implementation of the directive resulted with riots and triggered the return of many ethnic Chinese back to China, as many of their businesses were labelled as foreign-owned and liable to be confiscated. Tens of thousands of business owned by ethnic Chinese were either forcibly transferred (often with excessive force and threats) under the auspices of military personnel or peacefully, albeit with much reluctance and protest.

These chain of events led to a diplomatic rift between the Republic of Indonesia and the People's Republic of China which were seen as close allies then. The Chinese ambassador, Huang Chen insisted that the directive should be reviewed but was denied by Indonesia's State Minister, Subandrio in which he insisted there is no element of anti-Chinese sentiment but rather, a part of the necessary nationalization and socialization of the economy. On 10 December 1959, Peking Radio announced a campaign for ethnic Chinese to return to "The Warmth of Motherland". The Chinese embassy soon listed thousands Chinese citizens interested in returning to China. About 199,000 applied, but only 102,000 managed to be placed in a ship sent by the PRC government.

== Cabinet Presidium Decision 127 of 1966 ==
Cabinet Presidium Decision 127 of 1966 (Keputusan Presidium Kabinet Nomor 127 Tahun 1966, 127/U/Kep/12/1966) was an Indonesian law passed in 1966 that suggested Indonesian-sounding names to be adopted by Indonesian Chinese. It was considered to be part of the anti-Chinese legislation in Indonesia. The resident Chinese community in Indonesia resented it because it forced them to lose traditional family names. However, some people thwarted the government efforts to some degree by incorporating their Chinese name into their new Indonesian name. For example, the Chinese family name "Tan" was easily embedded in the Indonesian name "Sutanto".

== Presidential Decision 240 of 1967 ==
Presidential Decision 240 of 1967 (Keputusan Presiden Nomor 240 Tahun 1967, Keppres No. 240/1867) mandated assimilation of "foreigners" and supported a previous directive, 127/U/Kep/12/1966, for Indonesian Chinese to adopt Indonesian-sounding names.

== Presidential Instruction 14 of 1967 ==
Presidential Instruction No. 14/1967 (Inpress No. 14/1967) on Chinese Religion, Beliefs, and Traditions effectively banned any Chinese literature and cultures in Indonesia, including the prohibition of Chinese characters. Although Chinese names were not explicitly mentioned, "newly naturalized" Indonesian Chinese were strongly advised to adopt non-Chinese names. (Annulled by former president Abdurrahman Wahid in Keppres No. 6/2000; annulment supported by former president Megawati Sukarnoputri in Keppres No 19/2002 by declaring Chinese New Year as national holiday.)

== 1967 ==
Laws affecting Chinese Indonesians proliferated under the New Order regime under former President Suharto's reign. Suharto was a strong advocate for Chinese assimilation rather than integration. As part of 1967's 'Basic Policy for the Solution of the Chinese Problem' and other measures, only one Chinese-language newspaper was allowed to continue, all Chinese religious expressions had to be confined to their homes, Chinese-language schools were phased out, Chinese script in public places was banned, and Chinese were pushed to take on Indonesian-sounding names. Most of this legislation were revoked following Suharto's fall from power in 1998.

== Ampera Cabinet Presidium Circular 6 of 1967 ==
Ampera Cabinet Presidium Circular 6 of 1967 (Indonesian: Surat Edaran Presidium Kabinet Ampera Nomor SE-06/Pres.Kab/6/1967) was released on 28 June 1967. One of the points of contention is the selection of a proper term to describe Indonesian residents of Chinese descent. Accompanying explanatory text to Article 26 of the 1945 Constitution used the term Tionghoa to describe this group. In 1948, the Communist Party of Indonesia began using Tionghoa in its terminology, prompting the beginning of an unofficial ban on its use. By 1967, a cabinet circular enforced the use of the term Cina over Tionghoa and Tiongkok.

== Other examples ==
- Cabinet Presidium Instruction No. 37/U/IN/6/1967, prohibiting further residency or work permits to new Chinese immigrants, their wives, or children; freezing any capital raised by "foreigners" in Indonesia; closure of "foreign" schools except for diplomatic corps and their families; requiring the number of Indonesian students to be the majority and in proportion to "foreigners" in any state schools; and making implementation of the "Chinese issue" be the responsibility of the minister for political affairs.
- Resolution of the Provisional People's Consultative Assembly No. 32, 1966 (TAP MPRS No. 32/1966), effectively banning the use of Chinese characters in newspapers and magazines.
- Home Affairs Ministry No. 455.2-360/1988 on Regulation of Temples, effectively and severely restricting building or repairing Chinese temples.
- Circular of the Director General for Press and Graphics Guidance in the Ministry of Information No. 02/SE/Ditjen-PPGK/1988, further restricting the usage of Chinese language and/or characters.
- Instruction of the Ministry of Home Affairs No. X01/1977 on Implementing Instructions for Population Registration and the confidential instructions No.3.462/1.755.6 of the Jakarta government 28 January 1980, both authorising special codes in national identification cards to indicate ethnic Chinese origin, the code being A01
- Cabinet Presidium Circular SE-06/Pres-Kab/6/1967 on Changing the Term China and Chinese, requiring the usage of the term "Cina" (considered a derogatory term by many Chinese Indonesians) instead of "Tionghoa" or "Tiongkok" (used by ethnic Chinese themselves).
- the status of Confucianism as one of Indonesia's six official religions was revoked. In 1978, the Minister of Home Affairs issued a directive that there were only five religions, excluding Confucianism. On 27 January 1979, a presidential cabinet meeting took place and it firmly decided that Confucianism was not a religion. Another directive from Minister of Home Affairs was issued in 1990 re-iterating about there being only five official religions in Indonesia.

== Anomalies and exceptions ==
There are exceptions to laws and regulations that ban the use of Mandarin. The use of Mandarin in traditional Chinese medicine prescriptions, for example, is not prohibited, since legal proceedings related to this case have been suspended after lobbying made to the Attorney General (Jaksa Agung) of Indonesia by INI (Ikatan Naturopatis Indonesia).

== Current practice ==
Officially, many such laws ended with the fall of Suharto in 1998. During his tenure as president, Abdurrahman Wahid ended restrictions on Chinese culture and language, and made Chinese New Year a national holiday, but the repercussions of the discrimination then are still felt today and Indonesian Chinese are still discriminated in some regions.

== See also ==
- Chinese Indonesians
- Chinese Indonesian surname
- Supreme Council for the Confucian Religion in Indonesia
- Discrimination against Chinese Indonesians
- 1740 Batavia massacre
- 1918 Kudus riot
- Mergosono massacre (1947)
- Indonesian mass killings of 1965–66
- Banjarmasin riot of May 1997
- May 1998 Indonesian riots
- Sōshi-kaimei, similar movement in Korea under Japanese rule
- Thai cultural mandates, similar policies imposed in Thailand during Plaek Phibunsongkhram regime

== Bibliography ==
- Coppel, Charles A. (2002), Studying Ethnic Chinese in Indonesia, Asian Studies Monograph Series, Singapore: Singapore Society of Asian Studies, ISBN 978-9971-9904-0-4.
- Pompe, Sebastiaan, ed. (1992), Indonesian Law 1949–1989: A Bibliography of Foreign-Language Materials with Brief Commentaries on the Law, Dordrecht: Martinus Nijhoff Publishers, pp. 144–147, ISBN 978-0-7923-1744-9.
