= Cherie Nursalim =

Indonesian businesswoman

- 林美金
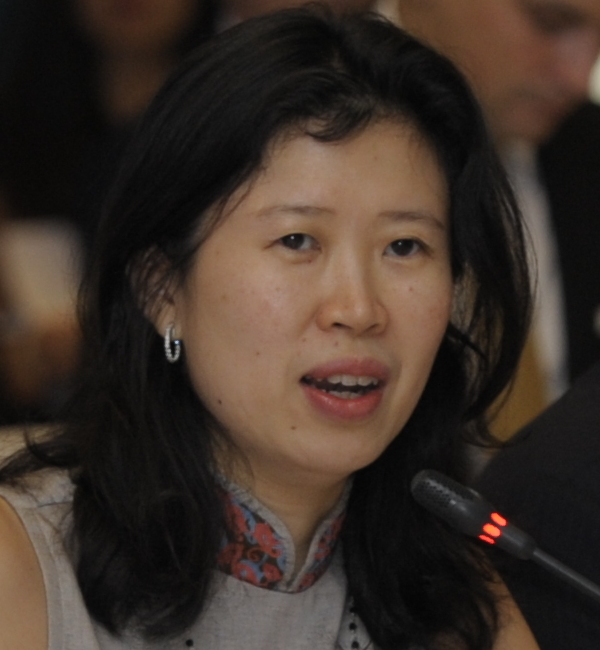
- Born: Liem Mei Kim; 1 August 1967 (age 58); Singapore

Cherie Nursalim (Liem Mei Kim; born c.1968) is an Indonesian businesswoman and philanthropist. She is the Vice Chairman of GITI Group and a special advisor to the government of the Republic of Indonesia. Together with her brother William Liem and her sister Michelle Liem Mei Fung, she is a former shareholder in Tuan Sing Holdings, a regional investment company based in Singapore.

== Early life ==
Nursalim was born in Singapore, where she attended the CHIJ Saint Nicholas Girls' School. Her father, Sjamsul Nursalim, is an Indonesian businessman. She was taken overseas by her family after her primary education and later went to the UK, where she attended St Paul's Girls' School. She graduated in Engineering and Economics from St Hilda's College, Oxford, in 1985. She obtained a Master's degree in Business Administration from Columbia Business School in New York City, and also worked as a research associate at Harvard Business School.

== Career ==
She is the Vice Chairman of the International Chamber of Commerce (ICC) and a board member of Publicis Groupe, IMAGINE, the Business and Sustainable Development Commission Global Blended Finance Taskforce, and Partnering for Green Growth (P4G). She chairs the Southeast Asia Chapter of the United Nations Sustainable Development Solutions Network, and the Tsinghua University Southeast Asia Centre in Bali, where she is the developer of Kura Kura Bali, a project that aims to implement the Tri Hita Karana philosophy of happiness. She was a co-founder of United In Diversity (UID).

Nursalim is on the Asia and International Advisory Boards for MIT Sloan School of Management, Columbia University and Geneva Tsinghua Initiative (GTI). She is a member of the advisory board of the Research Centre for Climate Change for University of Indonesia, and of the board of the Singapore Science Centre, the World Green Building Council, the Women's World Banking Southeast Asia Advisory Council, and the Global and Asia Philanthropy Circle.
