= Teddy Jusuf =

Indonesian general

Brigadier General (Ret.) Teddy Jusuf
- 熊德怡
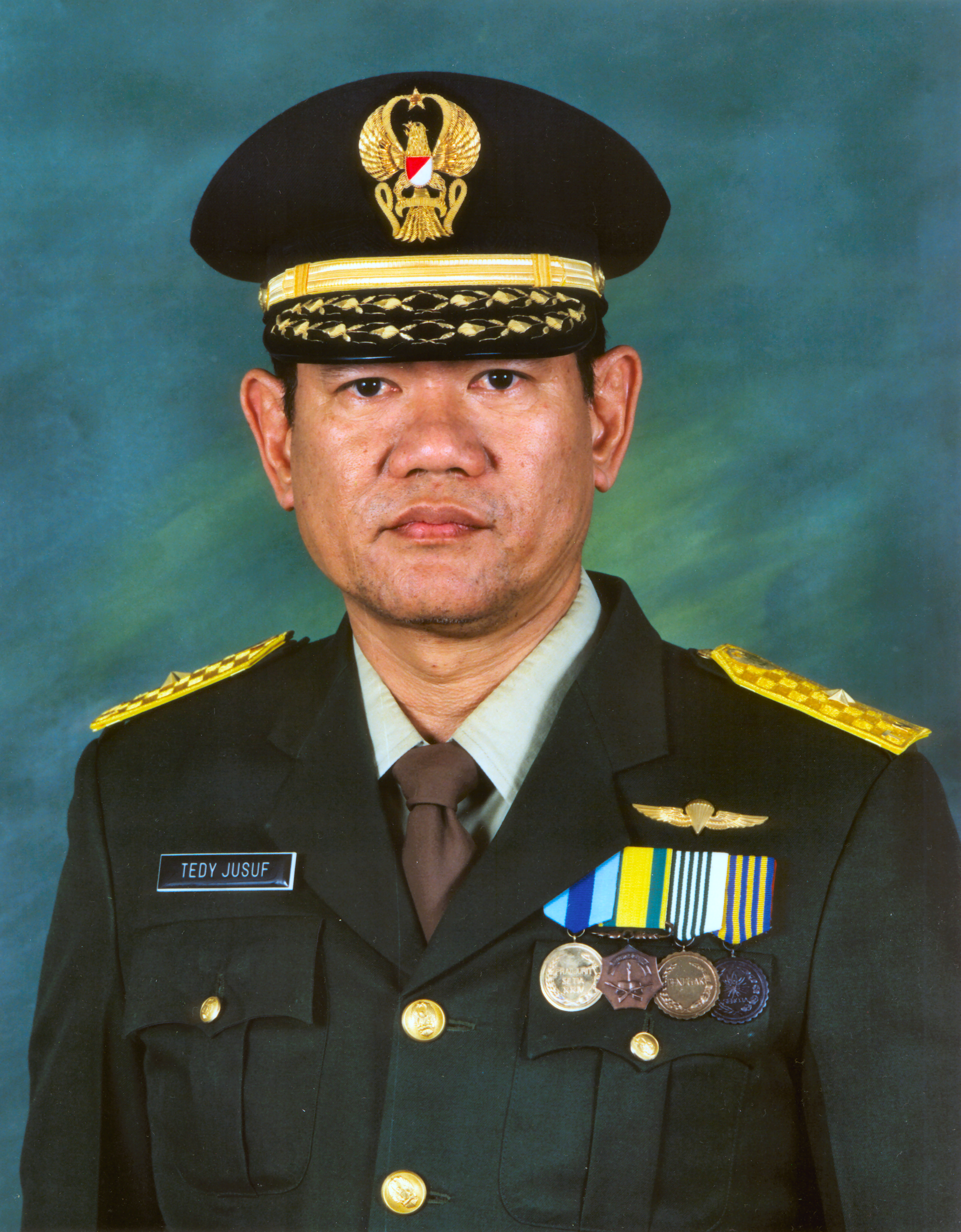
- Born: Him Tek Jie; 24 May 1944 (age 82); Bogor, Indonesia
- Political party: Partai Demokrat

Teddy Jusuf (or Tedy Jusuf, born Him Tek Jie, Chinese: 熊德怡; pinyin: Xióng Déyí) is a retired brigadier general of the Indonesian National Armed Forces (TNI), Indonesia's armed forces. He is the first Chinese Indonesian to attain this rank in the TNI.

Currently, Jusuf is chairman of the Chinese Indonesian Social Association (Paguyuban Sosial Marga Tionghoa Indonesia).

== Early life ==
Jusuf was born with the name Him Tek Ji in Bogor, Indonesia to a migrant-born father and an Indonesian-born mother, both of Chinese descent. He was a Hakka.

He was ten years old when he saw the soldiers at an Indonesian military camp stationed near his school in North Jakarta where he grew up. When he saw them training, he decided he wanted to become an Indonesian soldier.

Tek Ji attended both national and Chinese language schools as a boy and speaks Mandarin besides his native language Indonesian.

== Military career ==
Him Tek Ji enrolled in the Indonesian Military Academy when he finished secondary school. He graduated in 1965 as Lt. Teddy Jusuf.

Despite enduring a lot of discrimination in his early days in the army, Jusuf rose through the ranks, becoming a brigadier general in 1983 and even serving as a senior staff member in army intelligence. Jusuf attributes his success to hard work, discipline, and patience, qualities which would serve him well later in establishing the Chinese Indonesian Social Association.

Him Tek Ji was the commander of the ST-16 combat detachment in East Timor from 1998-2000.
