= Lima Cahaya =

Indonesian multi-outlet department store

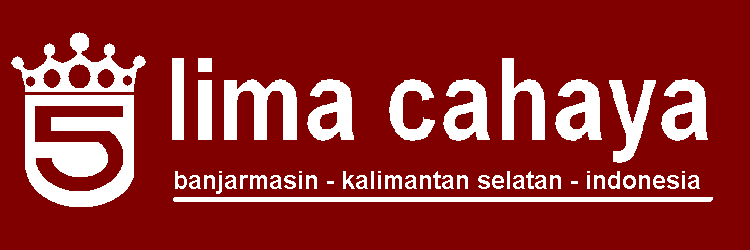
- Type: Private
- Genre: Department Store
- Founded: 1966
- Founder: Lauw Hai Ming
- Headquarters: Banjarmasin, Indonesia
- Area served: South Kalimantan, Central Kalimantan

Lima Cahaya is a multi-outlet department store in the city of Banjarmasin, South Kalimantan, Indonesia. Its name literally means "five lights".

== History ==
Lima Cahaya first store opened at 1966 was located along the stretch of Jl. Taman Sari at 1966. It moved to large location at Jl. Pangeran Samudera at 1974 and became the centre of fashion in the area of Banjarmasin. It opened another outlet at Jl Ahmad Yani at 1998 with an integrated MiniMarket at its ground level.

== Influence on region ==
Lima Cahaya positively influenced the region by introducing most major fashion brands to the provinces of South Kalimantan and Central Kalimantan.

== Stores ==
- Ahmad Yani: Jl. A. Yani km 5,5 no 416
- Pangeran Samudera: Jl. Pangeran Samudera no 143-145

== Pictures ==
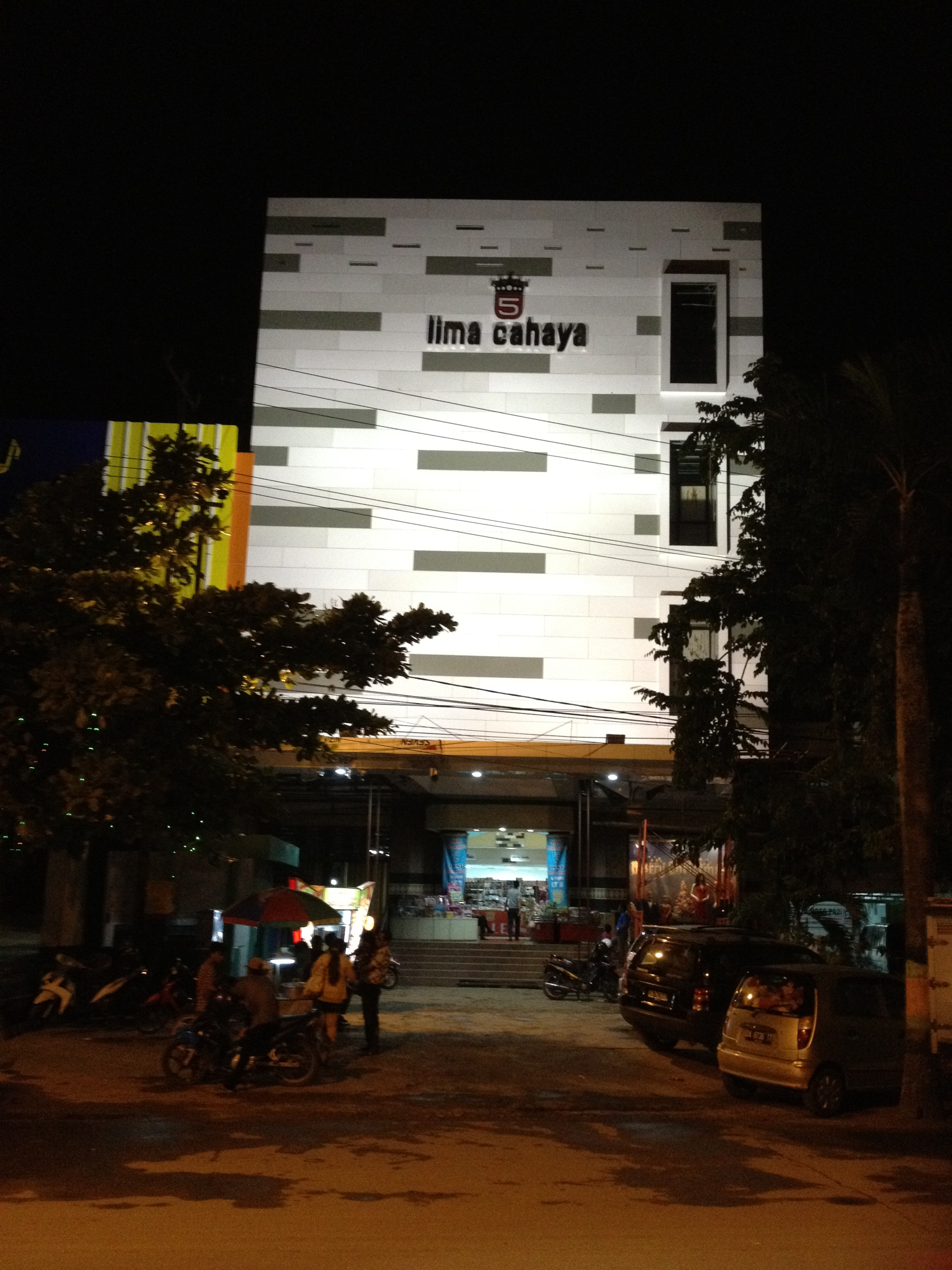
Lima Cahaya AY Night Front Facade

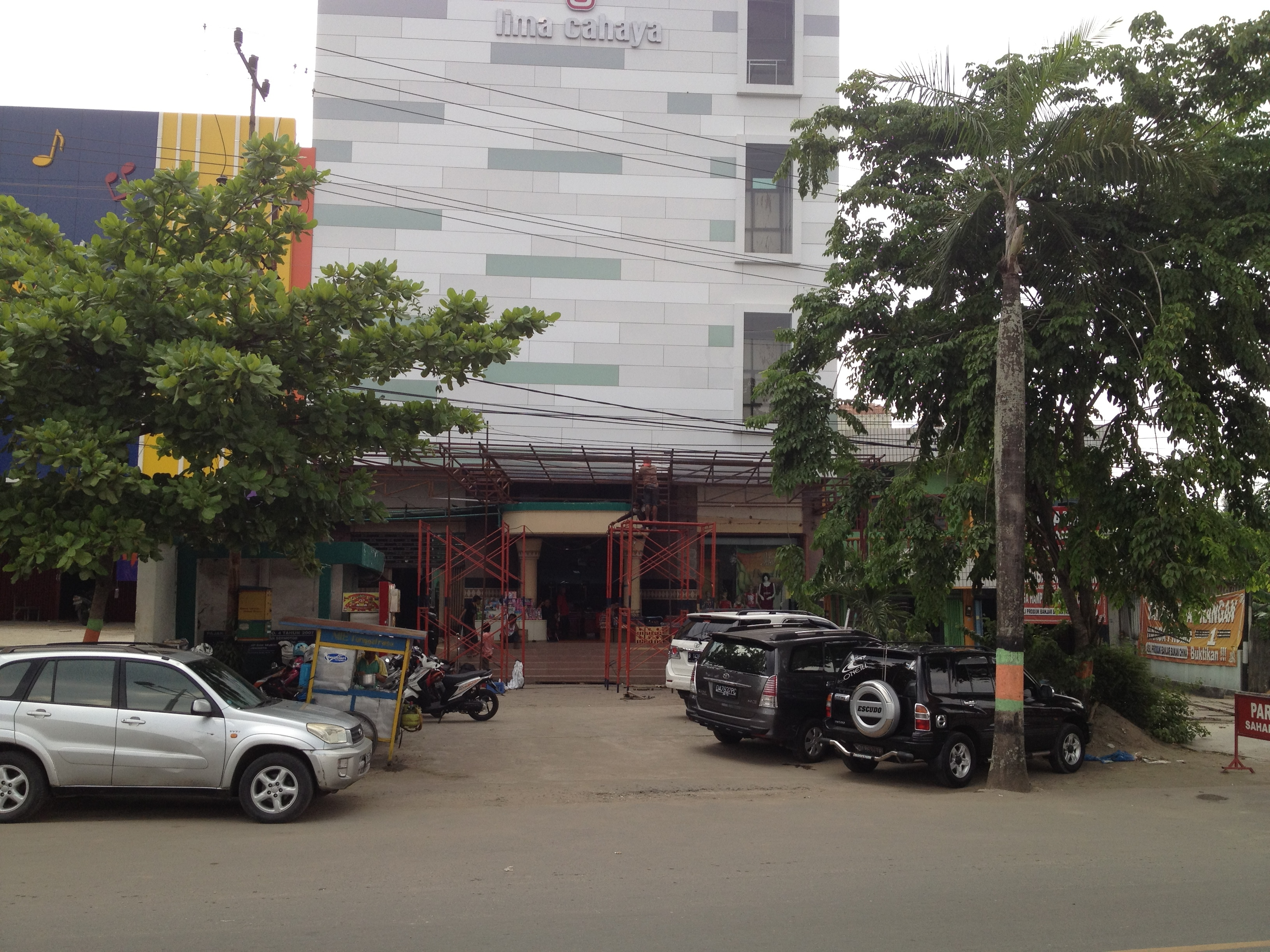
Lima Cahaya 2
