= 1997 Banjarmasin riot =

1997 riot against Golkar supporters and minorities in Indonesia

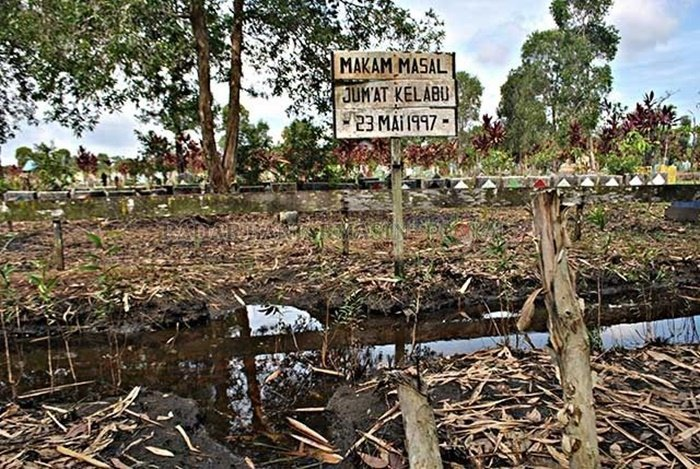
Mass grave of the victims of the 1997 Banjarmasin Riots in the Landasan Ulin, Banjarbaru.

The Banjarmasin riot of May 1997 took place on May 23, 1997, on the last day of the election campaign for the 1997 Indonesian legislative election. In strongly Islamic Banjarmasin, supporters of the PPP were aggravated by perceived abuses of power by the ruling Golkar party. After Friday prayers, thousands of people attacked supporters heading to a Golkar rally.

The ensuing violence resulted in the killing of several Golkar supporters, as well as attacks on the interests of big businesses, Christians, and the Chinese.

A Batak Protestant Church, close to a large mosque, and its neighbouring Chinese-owned houses were burned, as well as the Catholic Saint Mary's Cathedral, two other Catholic churches, several Catholic schools, and a home for the elderly. In addition, 8 shopping malls, Lima Cahaya department store (the largest in the area at the time), Chinese-owned businesses, and churches of seven denominations, a Buddhist temple, two hotels, 21 cars, 130 houses, and four government buildings were damaged or destroyed.

In total, at least 137 people were killed, mostly on the second floor of the Mitra Plaza mall, which had been occupied by looters reluctant to surrender to the surrounding police.
