= Kimun Ongkosandjojo =

- 王金溫
- Born: Ong Kiem Oen; 31 March 1912; Wonogiri, Central Java
- Died: 1990 (aged 77–78); Solo City
- Occupations: Businessman, inventor
- Known for: Founder of herbal medicine, Jamu Air Mancur
- Successor: Sons Sardjiman, Irwan, Seto, Seco, and Dipa Ongkosandjojo
- Spouse: Tio Yan Nio
- Children: 10
- Website: www.airmancur.co.id

Kimun Ongkosandjojo, born Ong Kiem Oen (Chinese: 王金溫; pinyin: Wáng Jīn Wēn; Pe̍h-ōe-jī: Ông Kim Un, 1912–1990) was a Chinese Indonesian businessman, and inventor. He was one of the founders of PT Jamu Air Mancur, one of the largest herbal medicine companies in Indonesia.

Ongkosandjojo was born in Wonogiri, and was of descent but grew up within Javanese culture. He was married to Tio Yan Nio and had 10 children. Ongkosandjojo was a polymath scholar who had a deep passion in studying worldwide history, science, astronomy, languages and nature. Because of this widespread curiosity, as a teenager Ongkosandjojo often replaced his lecturers while they were on military duties during World War II.

He co-founded and became President Director of PT Jamu Air Mancur, one of Indonesia's largest manufacturers of herbal medicine, since 1963, having worked there as Production Director since the company started in 1963. His co-founders included Lambertus Wonosantoso and Rudy Hyndrotanojo.

Awards and achievements
Preceded by incumbent for Air Mancur	Director of Air Mancur; 1970 for Air Mancur	Succeeded by Sardjiman Ongkosandjojo for Air Mancur
