= Budi Anduk =

Indonesian actor

- Born: Budi Prihatin; 8 February 1968; Jakarta, Indonesia
- Died: 11 January 2016 (aged 47); Jakarta, Indonesia
- Education: University of Indonesia
- Spouse: Neneng Nurhayati (m. 2007)

Comedy career
- Years active: 1996–2016

Budi Anduk (8 February 1968 – 11 January 2016), born Budi Prihatin, was an Indonesian actor and comedian.

== Career ==
Budi began his career in television comedy program Ngelaba in 1996. His name more widely known through his acting in the sitcom program Tawa Sutra. He has starred in two films, namely Tiren: Mati Kemaren and Tulalit.

== Death ==
Budi died of lung cancer in Dharmais Hospital, Jakarta, on 11 January 2016.

== Filmography ==
=== Television ===
- Ngelaba
- Tawa Sutra
- Opera Van Java
- Untung Ada Budi

=== Films ===
- Tiren: Mati Kemaren (2008)
- Tulalit (2008)
