= Koentjaraningrat =

Indonesian anthropologist (1923–1999)

Kanjeng Pangeran Haryo Koentjaraningrat Ph.D
- Born: 15 June 1923; Yogyakarta, Indonesia
- Died: 23 March 1999 (aged 75); Jakarta, Indonesia
- Occupation: Professor of Anthropology

Academic background
- Education: Yale University
- Thesis: A Preliminary Description of the Javanese Kinship System (1957)
- Doctoral advisor: Elizabeth Allard
- Influences: George Murdock, Clyde Kluckhohn

Academic work
- Discipline: Anthropology
- Sub-discipline: Cultural anthropology
- School or tradition: Ethnology
- Institutions: University of Indonesia
- Main interests: Javanese culture
- Notable works: Villages in Indonesia, Javanese Culture

Kanjeng Pangeran Haryo Koentjaraningrat ([kʊntʃaraˈniŋrat]; 15 June 1923 – 23 March 1999) was an Indonesian anthropologist. He is sometimes referred to as "the father of Indonesian anthropology".

== Biography ==
Koentjaraningrat was born in Yogyakarta, Indonesia on 15 June 1923 to a Pakualaman family. His mother wanted him to obtain a Dutch education, so he was educated at Europeesche Lagere School, followed by Middelbare Uitgebreid Lager Onderwijs and Algemeen Middelbare School in Yogyakarta, later moving to Jakarta to continue his schooling. He became fluent in Dutch and English.

During the Japanese occupation of the Dutch East Indies, Koentjaraningrat was working at the National Library of Indonesia. He was tasked with escorting books from Jakarta to Yogyakarta for safekeeping. He later enrolled at Gadjah Mada University, majoring in Indonesian literature, because the political situation did not allow him to return to Jakarta.

After the Japanese withdrawal from Indonesia, Koentjaraningrat joined the 29th Brigade of the Student Forces as an English and history teacher. He was stationed in Kediri and later Mojoagung, East Java.

Koentjaraningrat moved to Jakarta after graduating from Gadjah Mada and taught at Boedi Oetomo High School. He later enrolled at the University of Indonesia to earn a doctorandus degree in Indonesian language and literature. After graduating in 1952, he stayed on to work with G. J. Held, professor of anthropology at the time. Koentjaraningrat later commented, regarding his choice to enter anthropology, that it was his only chance to go to the United States.

On 29 April 1954, Koentjaraningrat became engaged to Kustiani Sarwano, whom he met at the Faculty of Arts in Jakarta. That same year Koentjaraningrat received a Fulbright Scholarship and studied at Yale University in New Haven, Connecticut, United States under George Murdock. The following year, he and Kustiani were married. The ceremony took place in Jakarta, while Koentjaraningrat was in New Haven. He was represented by a kris (an Indonesian dagger). Kustiani later joined him in New Haven.

At Yale, Koentjaraningrat worked to add information on Indonesia to the Human Relations Area Files. He graduated in 1956 and returned to Indonesia. His thesis, A Preliminary Description of the Javanese Kinship System, was published the following year as a Cultural Series Report by Yale's Southeast Asia Studies Program. In 1999, it was described as "still the best single account of the subject."

Upon returning to Indonesia, Koentjaraningrat introduced Clyde Kluckhohn's scheme for variations in value orientation. He also enrolled at the University of Indonesia and started his doctoral studies under the supervision of Elizabeth Allard. In 1957, Koentjaraningrat established Indonesia's first anthropology department at the University of Indonesia. The following year, he graduated. His dissertation was titled Beberapa Metode Anthropologi dalam Penjelidikan2 Masjarakat dan Kebudajaan di Indonesia (EYD: Beberapa Metode Anthropologi dalam Penyelidikan-penyelidikan Masyarakat dan Kebudayaan di Indonesia, (English: Various Anthropological Methods in the Study of Indonesian Society and Culture).

In 1962, Koentjaraningrat was made professor of anthropology at the University of Indonesia. He sent his students to teach basic anthropology at various universities, including the University of North Sumatra in Medan, Padjadjaran in Bandung, Gadjah Mada in Yogyakarta, Udayana in Denpasar, Hasanuddin in Ujung Pandang, Sam Ratulangi University in Menado; and Cenderawasih University in Jayapura. These teachings formed the foundation for the anthropology departments at the respective universities.

In 1964, Koentjaraningrat founded the Lembaga Ilmu Pengetahuan Indonesia (English: Indonesian Centre for Knowledge). In 15 years, he wrote several major textbooks for anthropology and social science research for the use of his students.

Among his publications are Pengantar Antropologi (English: Introduction to Anthropology), published in 1959, Tokoh-Tokoh Antropologi (English: Prominent Figures in Anthropology), published in 1964, Beberapa Pokok Antropologi Sosial (English: Various Fundamentals of Social Anthropology), published in 1967, Atlas Etnografi Sedunia (English: A World Atlas of Ethnography), published in 1969, Metodologi Penelitian Masyarakat (English: Social Studies Methodology), published in 1973, Bunga Rampai Kebudayaan, Mentalitet dan Pembangunan (English: The Basics of Culture, Mentality, and Development), published in 1974, and Kebudayaan Jawa (English: Javanese Culture), which was published in both Indonesian and English in 1984.

Koentjaraningrat retired in 1988. After retirement, he enjoyed drawing. His drawings have been displayed at Taman Ismail Marzuki and in Paris. In 1997, despite failing health and having suffered numerous strokes, he and his wife made the hajj.

Koentjaraningrat died at age 76 on Tuesday, 23 March 1999 around 16:25 WIB in Kramat 128 Hospital, Central Jakarta as a result of a stroke and complications from diabetes. He was buried at Karet Bivak Public Cemetery.

== Awards ==
During his career, Koentjaraningrat received many awards and honours. He received the Satyalencana Dwidja Sistha twice, in 1968 and 1982, the Bintang Jasa Utama in 1994, and the Bintang Mahaputra Utama posthumously in 1999 from the Indonesian government. In 1976 he received an honoris causa doctorate from the University of Utrecht. He was named Lecturer of the Year by the Association of Southeast Asian Institutions of Higher Learning in 1968. In 1990, Sri Paduka Paku Alam VIII conferred upon him the title of Kanjeng Pangeran Haryo. In 1995, he was awarded the Fukuoka Asian Culture Prize. In 1997, he received the Penghargaan Ilmu-Ilmu Sosial (English: Social Studies Honour) from the Indonesian Association for the Development of the Social Sciences.

== Publications ==
A complete bibliography of Koentjaraningrat's work published during his lifetime is available in Poeze (2001).

=== Books in English ===
- A Preliminary Description of the Javanese Kinship System. New Haven: Yale University Press, 1957.
- Some Social-anthropological Observations on 'Gotong Rojong' Practices in Two Villages of Central Java. Translated by Claire Holt. Ithaca, N.Y.: Cornell Modern Indonesia Project, Southeast Asia Program, Department of Far Eastern Studies, Cornell University, 1961.
- Villages in Indonesia (as editor). Ithaca: Cornell University Press, 1967.
- Village Life South of Jakarta: Brief Report of a Comparative Study on 'Village Life Around Capital Cities of Southeast Asia'. Kyoto: Center for Southeast Asian Studies, Kyoto University, 1973.
- Anthropology in Indonesia: A Bibliographical Review. 's-Gravenhage: Nijhoff, 1975.
- Introduction to the Peoples and Cultures of Indonesia and Malaysia. Menlo Park, CA.: Cummings, 1975.
- The Social Sciences in Indonesia. Volume I (as editor). Jakarta: Indonesian Institute of Sciences (LIPI), 1975.
- Javanese Culture. Singapore/Oxford/New York: Oxford University Press, 1984.
- West Irian: A Bibliography (with J. van Baal and K.W. Galis). Dordrecht/Cinnaminson: Foris, 1984.
- Life Style and Aspirations of the Aged in Jakarta and Yogyakarta, Indonesia: Report of a Research on the Life Style and Aspirations of the Aged in Indonesia (with Anto Achadiyat, Hadi Poernomo, Meutia F. Swasono, Hari Poerwanto and Rudy Agusyanto. n.p.: Biro Riset Ilmu Sosial, 1994.
