= Pan (surname) =

Pan (潘)
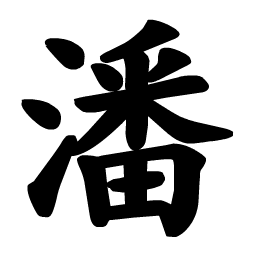
- Pronunciation: Pān (Mandarin) Poon (Cantonese - Hong Kong); Pun (Cantonese - Macau); Phoon (Cantonese - Malaysia); Phua (Hokkien); Pua (Hokkien - Philippines); Phan (Hakka); Phan (Vietnamese); Ban (Korean) Ban (Japanese)
- Language: Chinese, Korean, Japanese, Vietnamese

Origin
- Language: Old Chinese
- Derivation: Mi (芈)

Other names
- Variant forms: P'an, Poon, Phoon, Pon, Pun, Phua
- Derivatives: Phan, Ban, Han

Pān is the Mandarin pinyin romanization of the East Asian surname 潘. It is listed 43rd in the Song dynasty classic text Hundred Family Surnames. It is romanized as P'an in Wade–Giles; Poon, Phoon, Pon, or Pun in Cantonese; Phua in Hokkien and Teochew.

In 2019 it was the 36th most common surname in China.

潘 is also a common surname in Vietnam and Korea. It is romanized Phan in Vietnamese (not to be confused with Phạm) and Ban or Pan in Korean.

== Distribution ==
Pan 潘 is the 37th most common surname in China and the 31st most common surname in Taiwan.

None of the romanizations of Pan 潘 appeared among the 1000 most common surnames during the 2000 US census.

== Origins ==
As with many Chinese surnames, the origins of the Pan are various and sometimes legendary.

One origin was a clan name taken from a fief north of Shaanxi granted to Ji Sun, a descendant of King Wen of Zhou. Some members descend from Ji Sun himself, others from his vassals.

Another source was a cadet branch of the ruling House of Mi (芈) of the State of Chu during the Spring and Autumn period (770-476 BC). Among these Pans, Pan Chong (a noble in the state of Chu) served as regent and advisor for the state of Chu. When King Cheng of Chu decided to make a younger son the crown prince, Pan Chong aided the elder prince Shangchen instead. Shangchen forced King Cheng to commit suicide and ascended the throne as King Mu of Chu. Pan Chong was made the "Royal Tutor".

A third source in Taiwan was the adoption of the name by Taiwanese aborigines during their Sinicization. Members of the Plains tribes adopted the surname Pan as a modification of their designated status as barbarians (番, Fan). One family in particular became members of the local gentry, complete with a lineage to Fujian province.

The Phan Huy family is a branch of the Phan family in Vietnam, one of the families rich in literary and academic tradition since the 18th century. This family has settled for 18 generations from the early 17th century to the present in the commune Thach Chau, Loc Ha district, Ha Tinh province (formerly Thu Hoach village, Canh Hoach district, Thien Loc district, Duc Quang district, Nghe An town). During the reign of Phan Huy Ich, he moved to Sai Son, Quoc Oai (Da Phuc village) to settle[2].

The Phan Sy family in Thanh Chuong district, Nghe An province, Vietnam is a family has been settled there since the 16th century. Today it has two strong branches in Vo Liet and Thanh Khe communes. Known as a studious and accomplished lineage, the family contributed significantly to both resistance wars for the Fatherland and has produced many military leaders at various levels.

The Phan Ba family is a branch of the Phan family in Vietnam. This family has long settled in Vong Son village, Tung Anh commune, Duc Tho district, Ha Tinh province. Their life 10 years ago with children and grandchildren mainly worked as farmers. Today, children and grandchildren are invested in education, they had overcome difficulties, and contributed to the development of the family, clan, and homeland.

The Phan family in the Chau Hoan region, Vietnam was originally a noble family of the Tran family after the chaos of Ho Quy Ly usurped the throne to destroy the family, so they had to go into hiding and change the family name to Phan in 1400.

== List of persons with the surname ==
=== Pan ===
- Princess Pan, first wife of the future Emperor Zhenzong of Song in imperial China's Song dynasty
- Pan Shu, Empress of the Eastern Wu, consort of Sun Quan
- Consort Pan, imperial consort during the Chinese Liu Song dynasty. She was Emperor Wen's concubine
- Pan Mei, Military general and statesman of imperial China's Song dynasty.
- Pan Zhang, Eastern Han dynasty Military General of the Eastern Wu under Sun Quan
- He Pan (Jin dynasty), Chinese official and scholar of Shu Han and minister under the Jin Dynasty
- Pan You, Chinese politician murdered/executed by Li Yu (Southern Tang)
- Pan Shusi, Chinese military general executed and beheaded by Zhou Xingfeng (Ma Chu)
- Pan Yue (born Zhongmou, modern Zhongmu County, Henan), poet
- Pan Jixun, scholar-official during the Ming dynasty
- Pan En (1496–1582), Ming dynasty minister of justice for whom the Yu Garden was built by his son.
- Pan Yunduan (1526–1601), Ming dynasty governor of Sichuan who built the famous Yu Garden in Shanghai for his father, Pan En.
- Pan Pingge, late-Ming and early-Qing dynasty philosopher who advocated for practical ethics in daily living.
- Pan Zuyin, high-ranking Qing dynasty Grand Councilor and renowned antiquarian bronze collector.
- Pan Hannian, Chinese Politician
- Pan Men-an, Magistrate of Pingtung County
- Pan Qingfu, kung fu grandmaster
- Rebecca Pan (Poon Dik-wah, Tik-Wa Poon), Chinese-Hong Kong actress and singer
- Pan Shih-wei, Minister of Labor of the Republic of China (2014)
- Wen-Chung Pan (Pan Wen-chung), Deputy Mayor of Taichung (2014–2016)
- Will Pan, American-born Taiwanese rapper and actor
- Pan An-bang, Taiwanese singer
- Pan Jinlian, fictional character from Water Margin and The Plum in the Golden Vase
- Pan Anzi, Chinese film director
- Pan Changjiang, Chinese actor
- Cindy Pan, Australian-born medical practitioner, best-selling author and media personality.
- Pan Fu, Chinese politician and Premier of the Republic of China during the Beiyang government
- Pan Mei-chen, Taiwanese singer
- Pan Wei-chih, Taiwanese goalkeeper
- Pan Wen-Yuan, Chinese-American electrical engineer
- Pan Xiaoting (潘晓婷), WPBA Rookie of the Year in 2006, female professional pool player
- Yongmei Pan, Chinese electrical engineer
- Pan Zhanle (born 2004), Chinese swimmer
- Pan He, sculptor

=== Poa ===
- Hazel Poa (潘群勤; born 1970), Singaporean politician

=== Pua ===
- Tony Pua, Malaysian politician from the Democratic Action Party (DAP)
- Pua Hak Chuan, Singaporean criminal and murder suspect serving 14 years in jail
- Pua Khein-Seng (潘健成; born 1974), Malaysian engineer and the inventor of the USB flash drive
- Dechapol Puavaranukroh (Thai: เดชาพล พัววรานุเคราะห์; born 20 May 1997) Thai badminton player. He and Sapsiree Taerattanachai. won the silver and gold medals at the BWF World Championships in 2019 and 2021

=== Puah ===
- Jimmy Puah Wee Tse (潘伟斯; born 1976), Malaysian politician

=== Phoa ===
- Khee Liang Phoa (潘科良; born 1955), Dutch politician
- Phoa Beng Gan (潘明岩甲), Chinese-Indonesian bureaucrat and engineer, third Kapitein der Chinezen (or Chinese headman)
- Phoa Keng Hek (潘景赫舍; 1857–1937), Indonesian Landheer
- Phoa Liong Gie, (潘隆义舍; 1905–1983), Indonesian-born Swiss jurist, politician and newspaper owner
- Phoa Tjoen Hoat (潘春發; 1883–1931), Chinese Indonesian, Malay language journalist, translator and newspaper editor
- Phoa Tjoen Hoay (潘春懷; 1890–1966), Chinese Indonesian, Malay language journalist, translator and newspaper editor

=== Phua ===
- Paul Phua, Malaysian Chinese businessman and poker player
- Denise Phua, Singaporean politician and disability rights activist
- Cynthia Phua, Singaporean business executive and former politician
- Willie Phua, Singaporean news cameraman
- Phua Chu Kang, fictional protagonist of a popular Singaporean television sitcom
- Phua Bah Lee, Singaporean politician
- Somsak Jeamteerasakul (né Sukung Sae-phua), Thai historian and activist

=== Poon ===
- Ada Poon, electrical engineering professor from Hong Kong
- Albert Poon, race car driver from Hong Kong, notable wins include the 1964 Macau Grand Prix, the 1963 and 1965 Malaysia Grand Prix, the 1968 Selangor Grand Prix
- Annie Poon, American animator
- Christine Poon, American business executive
- Chung-Kwong Poon (潘宗光), president of Hong Kong Polytechnic University
- Dickson Poon, owner of the Harvey Nichols chain of department stores
- Poon Dik-wah, the Cantonese name of Rebecca Pan
- Joseph Poon, physicist
- Poon Lim, Chinese sailor who survived 133 days alone in the South Atlantic
- Kelly Poon, Singaporean Mandarin pop singer
- Kevin Poon, a Hong Kong-based entrepreneur, fashion designer, event organizer, and blogger
- Nina Poon, American makeup artist
- Richard Poon, Chinese-Filipino singer-songwriter
- Tiffany Poon, Hong Kong–born American classical pianist
- Wena Poon, a Singaporean-American novelist
- William Poon, founder of Poon's restaurants

=== Ban ===
- Ban Ki-moon (潘基文), South Korean diplomat, former UN Secretary General
- Ban Hyo-jung (潘曉靜), South Korean actress

=== Han ===
- Keiko Han, Japanese voice actress
- Megumi Han, Japanese voice actress
- Han Zenki, professional Go player

=== Phan ===
- Aimee Phan, writer/novelist
- Charles Phan, American chef, cookbook author, restaurateur
- Dat Phan, comedian, "Last Comic Standing" winner
- John Phan, professional poker player
- Joseph Phan, figure skater
- Michelle Phan, makeup artist
- Nam Phan, professional mixed martial artist
- Nicholas Phan, tenor
- Phan Thanh Giản (潘清簡), Imperial mandarin, diplomat
- Phan Đình Phùng (潘廷逢), 19th century revolutionary, anti-colonial military leader
- Phan Bội Châu (潘佩珠), 20th century scholar, revolutionary, anti-colonial activist
- Phan Chu Trinh (潘周楨), 20th century nationalist, writer, anti-colonial activist
- Phan Khắc Sửu, President of South Vietnam
- Phan Huy Quát, Prime Minister of South Vietnam
- Lê Đức Thọ (born Phan Đình Khải), Vietnamese Communist revolutionary, general, diplomat, and politician
- Phan Văn Khải, former Prime Minister of the Socialist Republic of Vietnam
- Phan Thị Kim Phúc, child subject of a Pulitzer Prize winning photograph taken during the Vietnam War
- Phan Bá Vành (潘伯鑅), charismatic leader, 19th century revolutionary
- Phan Khôi, author, intellectual leader
- Phan Nhiên Hạo, poet and translator
- Phan Nguyên Hồng, leading authority on the mangrove ecosystem in Asia
- Phan Xích Long (潘赤龍), mystic and geomancer
- Phan Quang Đán, politician

=== Phang ===
- Andrew Phang Boon Leong (潘文龙; born 1957), Singaporean supreme court judge
