= Jingyi Church =

- 敬一堂, 老天主堂 (Chinese)
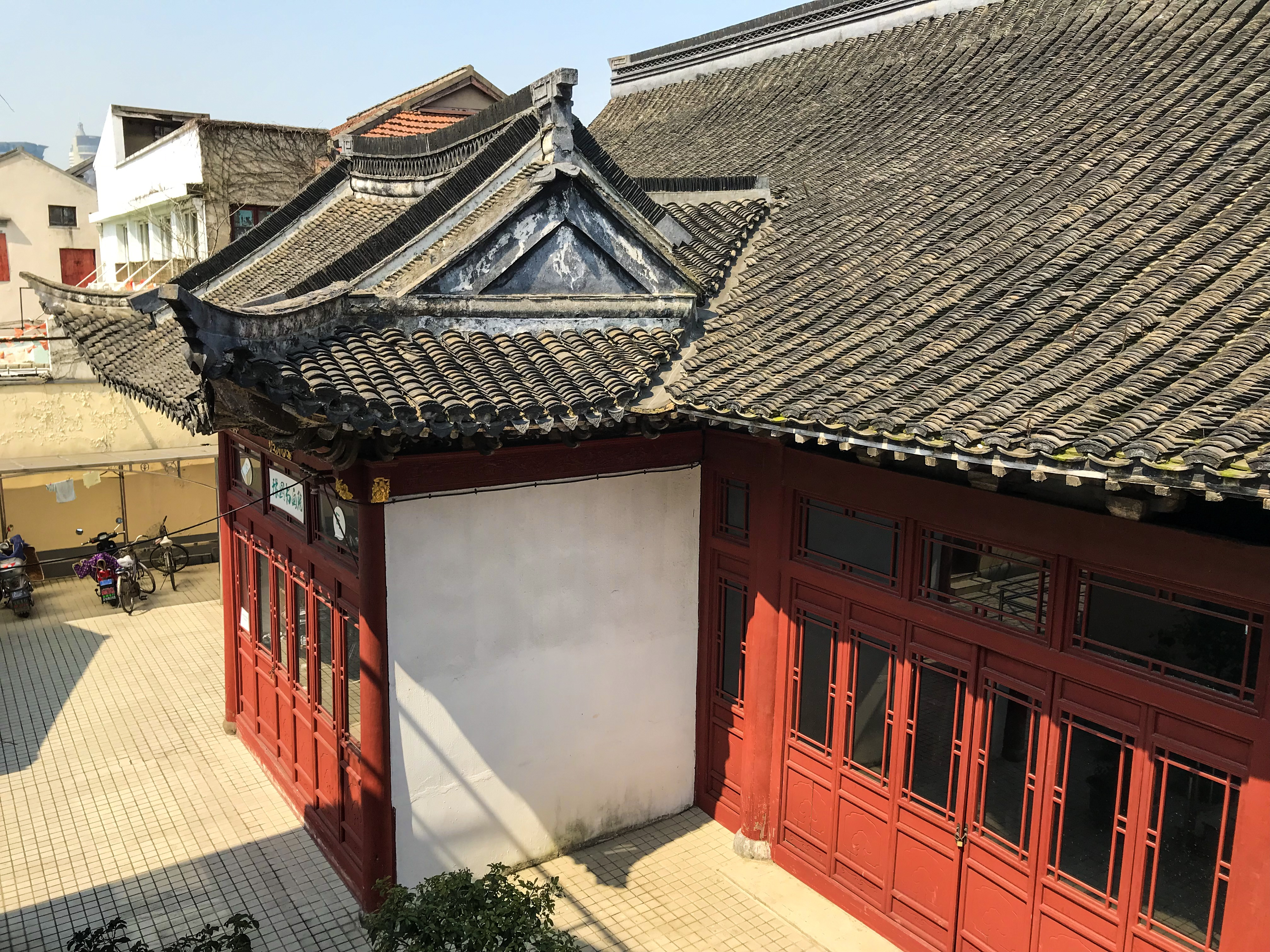
- Interactive map of Jingyi Church
- Type: Catholic Church
- Location: Shanghai, China

History
- Built: 1640

Jingyi Church (敬一堂), formerly known as Ever-Spring Hall (世春堂), and commonly referred to as The Old Catholic Church (老天主堂) or formerly The Church of the Savior in English, was the first Catholic Church in Shanghai, China, having been built in 1640 in the Ming Dynasty, located on current the grounds of the Fuyou Road No.1 Elementary School, in the Old City, Huangpu District, Shanghai. It currently is one of the oldest buildings still standing in Shanghai. The building was various a private Chinese residence, a Catholic church, a Taoist temple, and an elementary school throughout its history. The church had a thriving congregation of parishioners up until 1950s, when its religious activities were ceased after the Chinese Communist Revolution. Since then, its buildings had undergone many uses, including serving as an elementary school. The buildings are currently closed to visitors as they are under the threat of collapse.

== History ==
The church building was built as a private residence in 1553 by the Shanghai-raised governor of Sichuan Pan Yunduan (潘允端), a governor of Sichuan, for his father Pan En (潘恩), named the Ever-Spring Hall (世春堂) . Pan Yunduan also constructed the nearby famous Yu Garden in Shanghai for his father, and these buildings are all found in the same complex which was formerly the Pan family estate. Due to the decline of the Pan family, the hall was sold off to another family, the Fan (范) family.

in 1640, the building was purchased by Martina Pan, the granddaughter of Xu Guangqi, one of the early influential Shanghai Catholic converts, for the sake of Fr. Francesco Brancati (潘国光), an Italian Jesuit missionary, and converted into a church. At this time the building's name was changed to Jingyi Church (敬一堂), meaning "Hall of the Only Respected". It was called The Church of the Savior in English. At that time men and women were not allowed to attend mass at the same place, so women attended at the Church of Our Lady near Xujiazui. A side hall for astronomical observations were added and the church became a center for Catholicism in Shanghai.

In 1665, Yang Guangxian’s attacks on Christianity caused it to be banned in the realm. Fr. Brancati left Shanghai for Guangzhou after having taken up the frock in Shanghai for 28 years. At this time, the building became an office of an official of the Coastal Defense, Dong Caogao. In 1671, the ban was lifted and the Jesuits returned.

However, in 1724, the Yongzheng Emperor again banned Catholicism and other foreign religions in China. Thus, in 1731, the church building was confiscated and turned into a Taoist temple dedicated to the god of war, Guan Yu. In 1748, a Shenjiang Academy was built near the site.

With end of the Opium War in 1844, Christianity was again legalized in the country. An imperial edict requested that all old confiscated church lands be returned to the church, except those that had been converted into temples. Thus it was not until 1860 under the Treaty of Tianjin demands when the church buildings were returned to the Catholic Church. The war god temple moved to the present location of the No. 3 Primary School on East Fuxing Road in Shanghai. The Shenjiang academy also moved east, while the academy's old buildings were converted into a Catholic school named St. Berchmans school.

In 1938, a Shangzhi primary school (上智小学) was established on the site in the 1930s. At that time, the church had about 600 parishioners. The church operated there until religious activities were banned in 1950, after the Chinese Communist Revolution. The church school would later be renamed Wutong Road Primary School in 1953 after the Communist revolution, and the main church hall would be used as a gym.

In 1959, the building of the Catholic church was added to a list of Cultural Heritage sites in Shanghai city, and subsequently removed in 1966 during the Cultural Revolution. The title was restored on May 18, 1981. At this time until the late 1990s, it was used as the primary school gymnasium; it is currently unused.

== See also ==
- List of Catholic cathedrals in China
- Yu Garden
- List of Jesuit sites
