= Yuyuan (disambiguation) =

Yuyuan can refer to:

- Yuyuan Garden (豫园), a Chinese garden in Shanghai.
- Yuyuan Tourist Mart, a shopping center outside Yuyuan Garden.
- Jiang Yuyuan (江钰源), a Chinese gymnast.
- Yuyuan, the postal romanization of the name of Ruyuan Yao Autonomous County, Guangdong Province, China
- Yuyuan, a place in Chinese mythology
