= Sinar Sumatra =

Defunct newspaper from the Dutch East Indies

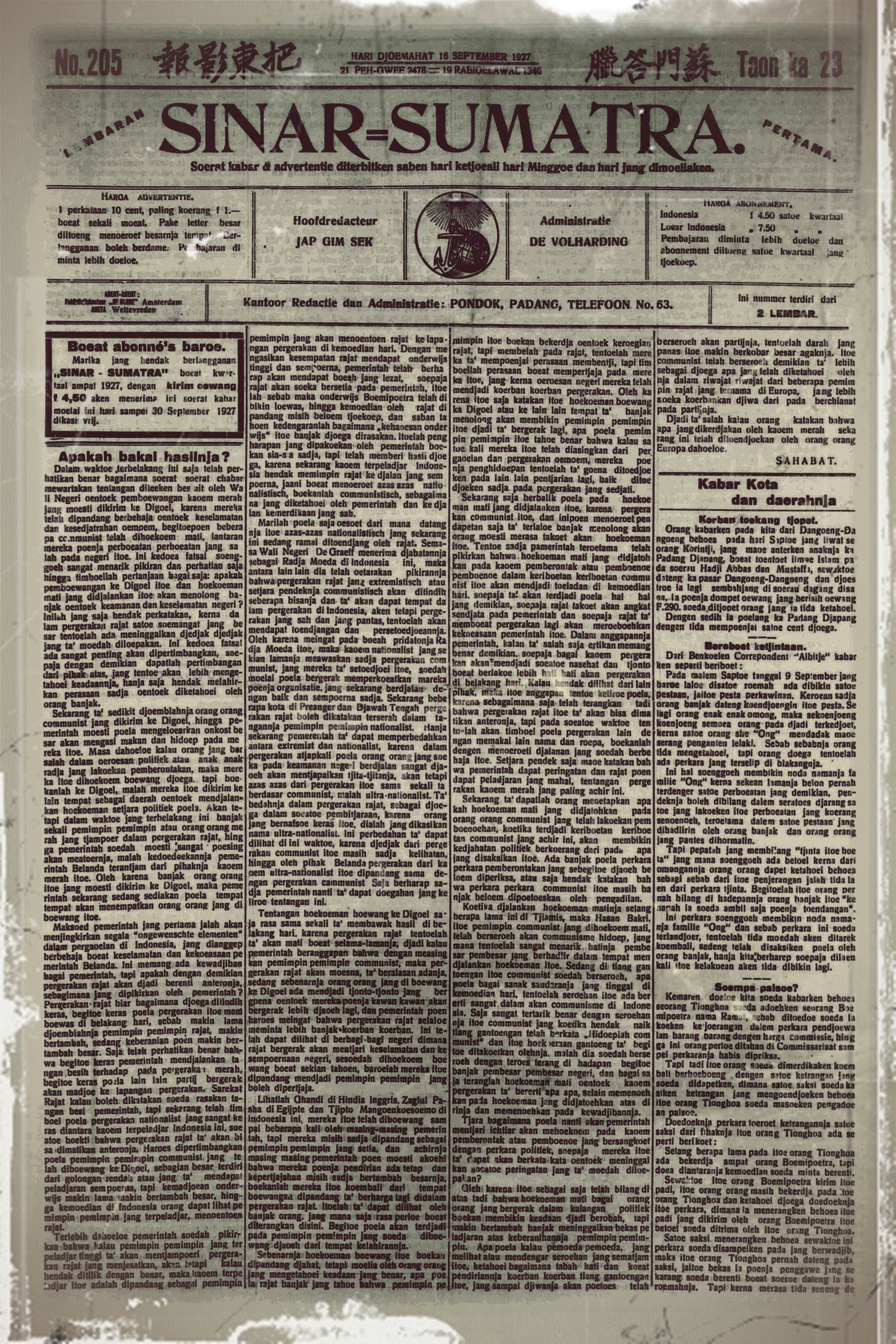
Front page of Sinar Sumatra from a 1927 issue

Sinar Sumatra (Malay for "Ray of light of Sumatra") was a Malay-language newspaper published in Padang, Dutch East Indies from 1905 to around 1941 or 1942. It is generally considered a Peranakan Chinese publication, although it had European publishers and Minangkabau editors as well. During the pre-World War II period, it was one of the most widely-read Malay language newspapers in Sumatra.

== History ==
Sinar Sumatra was launched in Padang, Dutch East Indies (now Indonesia) in 1905; after a few test issues in September, the first official issue came out on 4 October 1905. It was one of the first modern Malay-language newspapers in Sumatra, aiming to become a popular forum for discussion and education as well as news. Its publisher De Volharding Press was a local company owned by two Europeans, M. A. van Tijn and Y. Rongge. It was eight pages long and contained a mix of wire news, local news, and Chinese and Malay stories. It was operated by Peranakans (Chinese Indonesians); one of its founding editors was Liem Soen Hin, a journalist from Padangsidempuan who had previously edited Bintang Sumatra and Tjahaja Sumatra as well as some Batak newspapers. The paper grew popular among both Chinese and native Indonesian readers. In August 1908 Rogge decided to return to Java and sold his shares to a group of local Chinese investors who co-owned and operated it with van Tijn from then on. A touring British observer in 1909 described the paper as "in opposition to the government" which may indicate that it followed the path of Medan Prijaji and other Malay papers of the time which embodied a European-style critical press for the first time.

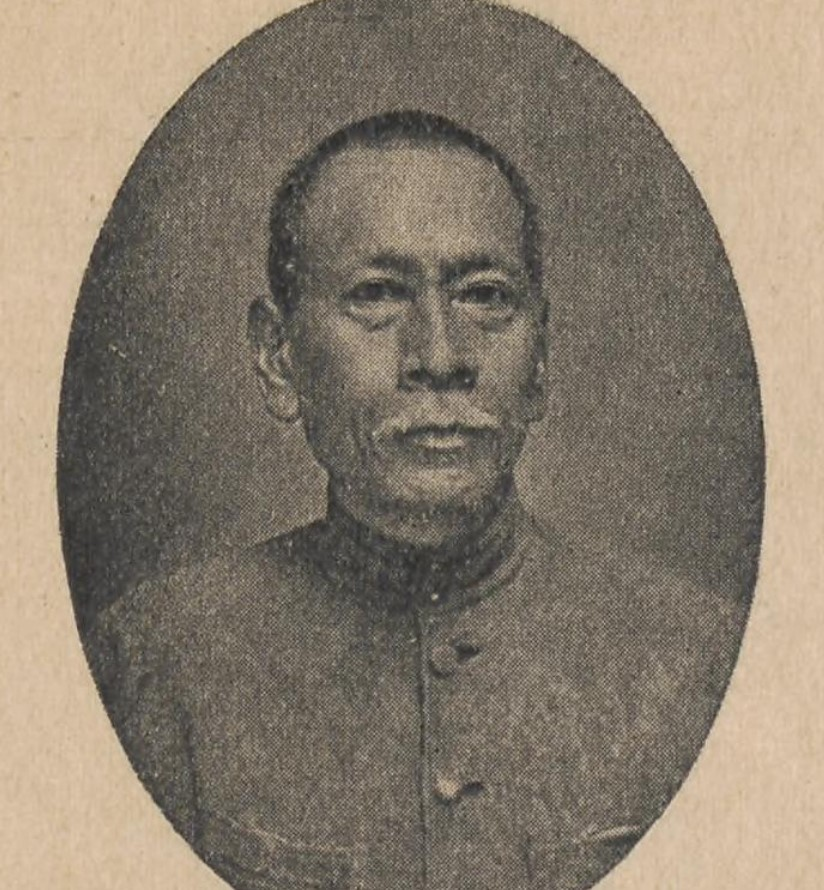
Lim Soen Hin

During World War I, Sinar Sumatra went through several new editors-in-chief. Liem Soen Hin, who had unsuccessfully tried to step down as editor in 1912, finally left in June 1914 and was followed by a series of people who only held the role for a year or two: Tan Soei Bing, a former Sin Po editor in 1914, Oeij Siauw Tjong in 1915, Phoa Tjoen Hoay, a former Warna Warta editor in 1915, then Tjia Soen Jong, and then Phoa's brother Phoa Tjoen Hoat in 1918. A number of other editors also worked at the paper during this period, including H. Soetan Ibraham, who may have been its first native Indonesian editor in 1915, The Giok Lan Nio, its first female editor in 1917, and various others including Lee Goan Ho, and Kwee Kheng Liong.

During the period from 1918 to 1921 Liem Koen Hian became the new editor-in-chief. Liem was highly critical of the colonial government and was a Chinese nationalist vocally opposed to the proposed Dutch Nationality Law for Indies Chinese; in the pages of the paper he often argued for the continuation of the status quo which had people like him as overseas citizens of China. The paper continued to grow in popularity and became one of the top Indies Chinese Malay newspapers, although in terms of circulation it could never compete with papers in Java such as Sin Po, Djawa Tengah or Pewarta Soereabaja.

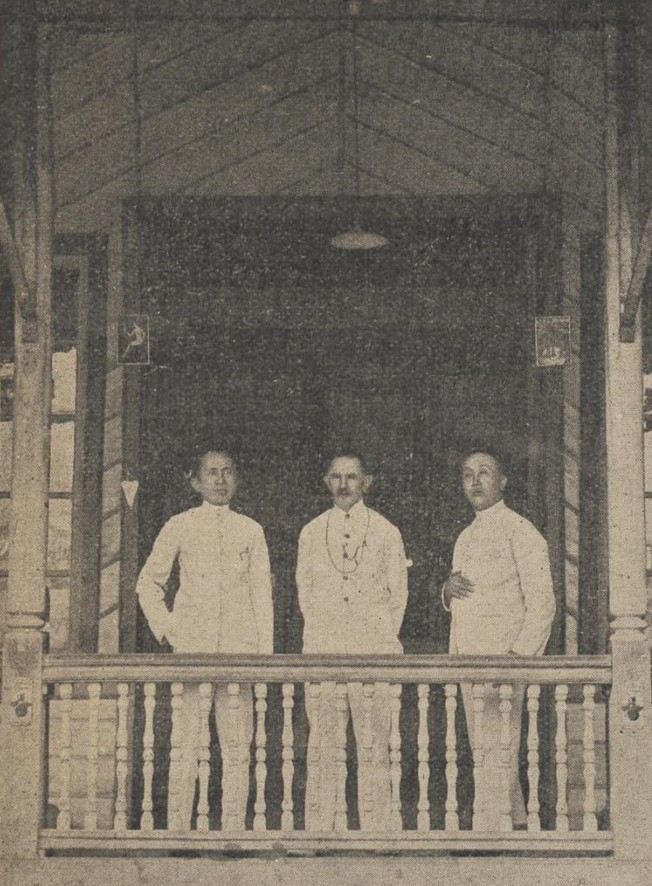
The publishers of Sinar Sumatra newspaper, Lie Djoe Soean, M. A. van Tijn, and Tiauw Kie Lie

In late 1922, Jap Gim Sek and Lie Soey Ho joined the editorial board. The offices of the printing company de Volharding burned down in the great fire of August 1923. The fire, which had begun by someone trying to destroy a wasp's nest, went out of control due to the high winds and ended up destroying more than 400 shops and houses in the Chinese district, where the print shop was located. Their printing equipment and archives were essentially destroyed and the publishing was interrupted; with the support of the printers of fellow paper Sumatra Bode, they resumed publication and eventually had new printing equipment shipped from Batavia. As the new equipment was a more modern electric printing press, the company rebranded itself as the Electrische Drukkerij en Papierhandel "de Volharding". In 1925 Jap Gim Sek was promoted to editor-in-chief, a role he held until 1930.

The paper faced a major blow in August 1928, when the entire editorial team resigned en masse, including Jap Gim Sek. It seems to have been the result of a dispute between them and the owners over their repeated Persdelict (press offence) court cases. The paper tried hiring several new editors, including Phoa Tjoen Hoay, Lie Soei Ho and A. Labab, all of whom only stayed a few months in their posts. However, Jap was allowed to return as editor-in-chief with a new crew of assistant editors in April 1929.

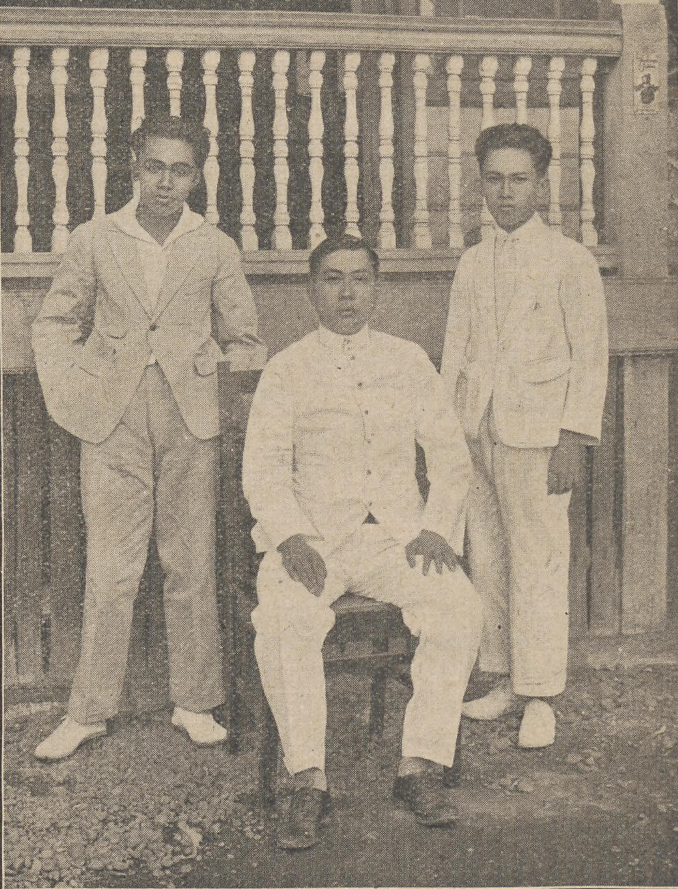
The editors of Sinar Sumatra newspaper in 1929: Marah Soeleiman gelar Soetan Moeliaa, Jap Gim Sek, Oei Goan Po

In late 1929, the paper celebrated 25 years of being in print with a special Jubilee issue, a ceremony with the mayor of Padang, and a reproduction of the first issue from 1905. In its final decade the paper also turned increasingly towards native Indonesian (especially Minangkabau) editors. In 1937 Boerhanoeddin became the new editor-in-chief, and then in 1939 M. Arief Loebis was appointed to the role. The last editor-in-chief seems to have been Datuk Sinaro.

The end of the newspaper is not well documented. It continued to publish until around the time of the Japanese invasion of the Dutch East Indies in January 1942, when the majority of the independent press in the Indies was forcibly shut down, and did not resume publication after Indonesian independence.
