= Zhang Nanyang =

Zhang Nanyang (Chinese: 張南陽; pinyin: Zhāng Nányáng) was a famed Ming Chinese stone gardener.

He was employed by Pan Yunduan in the construction of the original Yu Garden, although it is questionable whether the current rockeries are his work.
