= Zhang Yuming =

Qing Dynasty Chinese official

- Traditional Chinese: 張羽明
- Simplified Chinese: 张羽明
Transcriptions
Standard Mandarin
- Hanyu Pinyin: Zhāng Yǔmíng

Zhang Yuming (Chinese: 張羽明), courtesy name Shengqu (升衢), was a Chinese official of the Qing Dynasty.

Zhang Yuming passed the second stage of the imperial exams and received his Juren (舉人) degree. In 1665, he was appointed as the Prefect of Songjiang Prefecture (松江府知府). The short-lived "Academy of Purity and Harmony" (清和书院, Qīng-Hé Shūyuàn) in Shanghai's Yu Garden was initially dedicated to him.
