= Anne Whiston Spirn =

American landscape architect, photographer and author

Anne Whiston Spirn is an American landscape architect, photographer and author. Her work promotes community-oriented spaces that are functional, sustainable, meaningful, and artful. Spirn is Cecil and Ida Green Distinguished Professor of Landscape Architecture and Planning in the Department of Urban Studies and Planning of the MIT School of Architecture and Planning. She is the 2001 winner of the International Cosmos Prize.

== Early life and education ==
Sprin was born in 1947 in Waterbury, Connecticut and grew up in Cincinnati, Ohio. She graduated cum laude from Radcliffe College in 1969, where she studied art history. She received her master's degree in Landscape Architecture from the University of Pennsylvania in 1974.

== Career ==
After graduating from University of Pennsylvania, Spirn worked as an ecological designer and planner at the office of Wallace McHarg Roberts and Todd in Philadelphia from 1973 to 1977. From 1977 to 1978 she worked at Roy Mann Associates in Cambridge, Massachusetts. She then became a professor of landscape architecture at Harvard University from 1979 to 1986. She left Harvard in 1986 to become the chair of the Department of Landscape Architecture and Planning at the University of Pennsylvania and also served as the co-director of the Urban Studies Program there from 1996 to 2000. Spirn joined the faculty in the Department of Urban Studies and Planning at MIT in 2000.

=== West Philadelphia Landscape Project ===
Since 1987 Spirn has directed the West Philadelphia Landscape Project in West Philadelphia. This project links landscape design, community development, and urban stormwater management. The WPLP includes development of landscape plans to enhance environmental quality, improvements to stimulate economic development, and strengthening of local school curricula and professional education.

== Photography ==
In 2014, Spirn's photography was exhibited at the Smith College Museum of Art featuring work that was produced over 35 years during Spirn's travels for her academic and personal research.

== Published books ==
- Spirn, Anne Whiston (1 January 1984). The Granite Garden: Urban Nature and Human Design. New York: Basic Books. ISBN 0465026990. The book received the 1984 American Society of Landscape Architects (ASLA) President's Award of Excellence.
- Spirn, Anne Whiston (1 January 2000). The Language of Landscape. New Haven; London: Yale University Press. ISBN 0300082940. OCLC 43879910.
- Spirn, Anne Whiston (2009). Daring to Look : Dorothea Lange's Photographs and Reports from the Field. University of Chicago Press. ISBN 9780226769851. OCLC 173243862. (received the 2011 ASLA Honor Award)
- Spirn, Anne Whiston (2014). The Eye Is a Door: Landscape, Photography, and the Art of Discovery. Wolf Tree Press. ISBN 9781941642009.
