= Peter Bellwood =

Australian archaeologist (born 1943)

Peter Stafford Bellwood (born Leicester, England, 1943) is Emeritus Professor of Archaeology in the School of Archaeology and Anthropology at the Australian National University (ANU) in Canberra. He is well known for his Early Farming Dispersal Hypothesis and his Out of Taiwan model (with linguist Robert Blust) regarding the spread of Austronesian languages.

== Education and career ==
Peter Bellwood received his B.A. and Ph.D. from the University of Cambridge (King's College) in 1966 and 1980, respectively. His areas of specialization include the human population history of Southeast Asia and the Pacific from archaeological, linguistic and biological perspectives; the worldwide origins of agriculture and resulting cultural, linguistic and biological developments; and the prehistory of human migration. He has undertaken grant-funded archaeological fieldwork projects since 1967 in New Zealand, the Cook Islands, the Society and Marquesas Islands, Indonesia, Malaysia, Vietnam, and the Philippines. He is currently researching with Philip J. Piper and Lam My Dzung on an archaeological fieldwork project, funded by the Australian Research Council, on Neolithic sites in northern and central Vietnam.

Professor Bellwood was the Secretary-General of the Indo-Pacific Prehistory Association (1990 to 2009) and was formerly the Editor of the Bulletin of the Indo-Pacific Prehistory Association (now the Journal of Indo-Pacific Archaeology).

His books have been translated on 16 occasions into French, Greek, Russian, Turkish, Chinese (Traditional and Simplified), Japanese, Vietnamese and Indonesian.

Bellwood is a member of the Editorial Advisory Board of the archaeology journal Antiquity.

== Awards and recognition ==
Peter Bellwood is a Fellow of the Australian Academy of the Humanities and an International Fellow of the British Academy

In July 2021 Peter Bellwood won the International Cosmos Prize in Osaka, Japan, being the first Australian recipient.

== Publications ==
=== Books (selected) ===
- Peter Bellwood (2026), First Migrants, revised edition, John Wiley & Sons, ISBN 978-1-394-20241-6.
- Peter Bellwood (2023), First Farmers, second edition, John Wiley & Sons, ISBN 978-1-119-70634-2.
- Peter Bellwood (2022), The Five-Million-Year Odyssey, Princeton University Press, ISBN 978-0-691-19757-9. Winner of the 2023 PROSE Award in Biological Anthropology, Archaeology, and Ancient History, Association of American Publishers.
- Peter Bellwood (2019), The Spice Islands in Prehistory, ANU Press, ISBN 978-1-76046-290-1
- Peter Bellwood (2017), First Islanders: Prehistory and Human Migration in Island Southeast Asia, Wiley-Blackwell, ISBN 978-1-119-25154-5
- Peter Bellwood, Eusebio Dizon (2013), 4000 Years of Migration and Cultural Exchange, ANU Press, ISBN 978-1-925021-28-8
- Peter Bellwood (2013), First Migrants: Ancient Migration in Global Perspective, John Wiley & Sons, ISBN 978-1-4051-8908-8.
- Peter Bellwood (2007), Prehistory of the Indo-Malaysian Archipelago, 3rd edition, ANU E-Press, ISBN 978-1-921313-11-0
- Peter Bellwood (2005), First Farmers: The Origins of Agricultural Societies, John Wiley & Sons, ISBN 978-0-631-20566-1. Winner of the Association of American Publishers (Washington D.C.) Award for Excellence in Professional and Scholarly Publishing (Archaeology and Anthropology) for 2006; and winner of a Book Award from the Society for American Archaeology (Washington D.C. 2006).
- Ian Glover; Peter Bellwood (2004), Southeast Asia: from prehistory to history, Routledge, ISBN 978-0-415-29777-6.
- Peter Bellwood; Colin Renfrew (2002), Examining the farming/language dispersal hypothesis, McDonald Institute for Archaeological Research, University of Cambridge, ISBN 978-1-902937-20-5.
- Peter Bellwood (1997), Prehistory the Indo-Malaysian Archipelago, revised edition, University of Hawaii Press, ISBN 978-0-8248-1907-1
- Peter Bellwood (1985), Prehistory of the Indo-Malaysian Archipelago, Academic Press, ISBN 0-12-085371-X.
- Peter Bellwood; James J. Fox; Darrell T. Tryon (1995), The Austronesians: historical and comparative perspectives, ANU E Press, ISBN 978-0-7315-2132-6.
- Peter Bellwood (1978), Man's conquest of the Pacific: the prehistory of Southeast Asia and Oceania, Collins and Oxford University Press, ISBN 978-0-19-520103-1.
- Peter Bellwood (1978), The Polynesians: Prehistory of an Island People, Thames & Hudson, ISBN 978-0-500-02093-7. Revised edition 1987.

== See also ==
- Austronesian Hypothesis
- Demic diffusion – the impact of farming on human migration is a key research interest (see references above)
