= International Cosmos Prize =

Japanese science award

- Description: Harmonious Coexistence between Nature and Humankind
- Country: Japan
- Presented by: Commemorative Foundation for the International Garden and Greenery Exposition, Osaka, Japan, 1990 (Expo '90 Foundation)
- Reward: 40 million yen
- Website: https://www.expo-cosmos.or.jp/english/cosmos/

The International Cosmos Prize was established in 1993, commemorating Expo '90 in Osaka, Japan. The objective of the prize was to develop the basic concept of Expo '90, "The Harmonious Coexistence between Nature and Humankind" and is awarded by the Commemorative Foundation for the International Garden and Greenery Exposition, Osaka, Japan, 1990 (Expo '90 Foundation).

The prize, which may be awarded to an individual or team, consists of a commendation, a medallion and a monetary reward, currently 40 million yen. It is awarded during a ceremony held in each autumn, at which the individual or team.

The name of the prize, "Cosmos," refers to the Cosmos flower that bloomed during the Expo and the ancient Greek word kosmos meaning "universe in harmony."

== Subject matter ==
The prize shall be awarded for outstanding research work and/or achievement which promote the philosophy, "The Harmonious Coexistence between Nature and Humankind." The Prize shall also illuminate research and/or achievements that use not only analytical and reductive methods, but also advocate a global outlook and show integrated, long-term vision. The prize recognizes achievements in the natural and social sciences, humanities and the arts.

== Selection procedure ==
The Cosmos Prize Committee will form the Screening Committee of Experts which will screen candidates recommended by the designated recommenders. Based on the results of the screening, the Cosmos Prize Committee will decide the Prizewinner.

== Prizewinners ==
List of past Prizewinners:

- 1993 – Ghillean Prance
- 1994 – Jacques FranÇois Barrau
- 1995 – KIRA Tatsuo
- 1996 – George B. Schaller
- 1997 – Richard Dawkins
- 1998 – Jared M. Diamond
- 1999 – Wu Zhengyi
- 2000 – David Attenborough
- 2001 – Anne Whiston Spirn
- 2002 – Charles Darwin Research Station
- 2003 – Peter H. Raven
- 2004 – Julia Carabias Lillo
- 2005 – Daniel Pauly
- 2006 – Raman Sukumar
- 2007 – Georgina Mace
- 2008 – Phan Nguyên Hồng
- 2009 – Gretchen Cara Daily
- 2010 – Estella Leopold
- 2011 – Census of Marine Life
- 2012 – Edward O. Wilson
- 2013 – Bob Paine
- 2014 – Philippe Descola
- 2015 – Johan Rockström
- 2016 – IWATSUKI Kunio
- 2017 – Jane Goodall
- 2018 – Augustin Berque
- 2019 – Stuart L. Pimm
- 2020 – Not awarded due to COVID-19
- 2021 – Peter Bellwood
- 2022 – Felicia Keesing
- 2023 – Kristin Shrader-Frechette
- 2024 – William James Sutherland
- 2025 – David Andrew Keith
- 2026 – Robin Dunbar

== See also ==
- List of environmental awards
- List of social sciences awards
