= Augustin Berque =

French geographer, Orientalist and philosopher

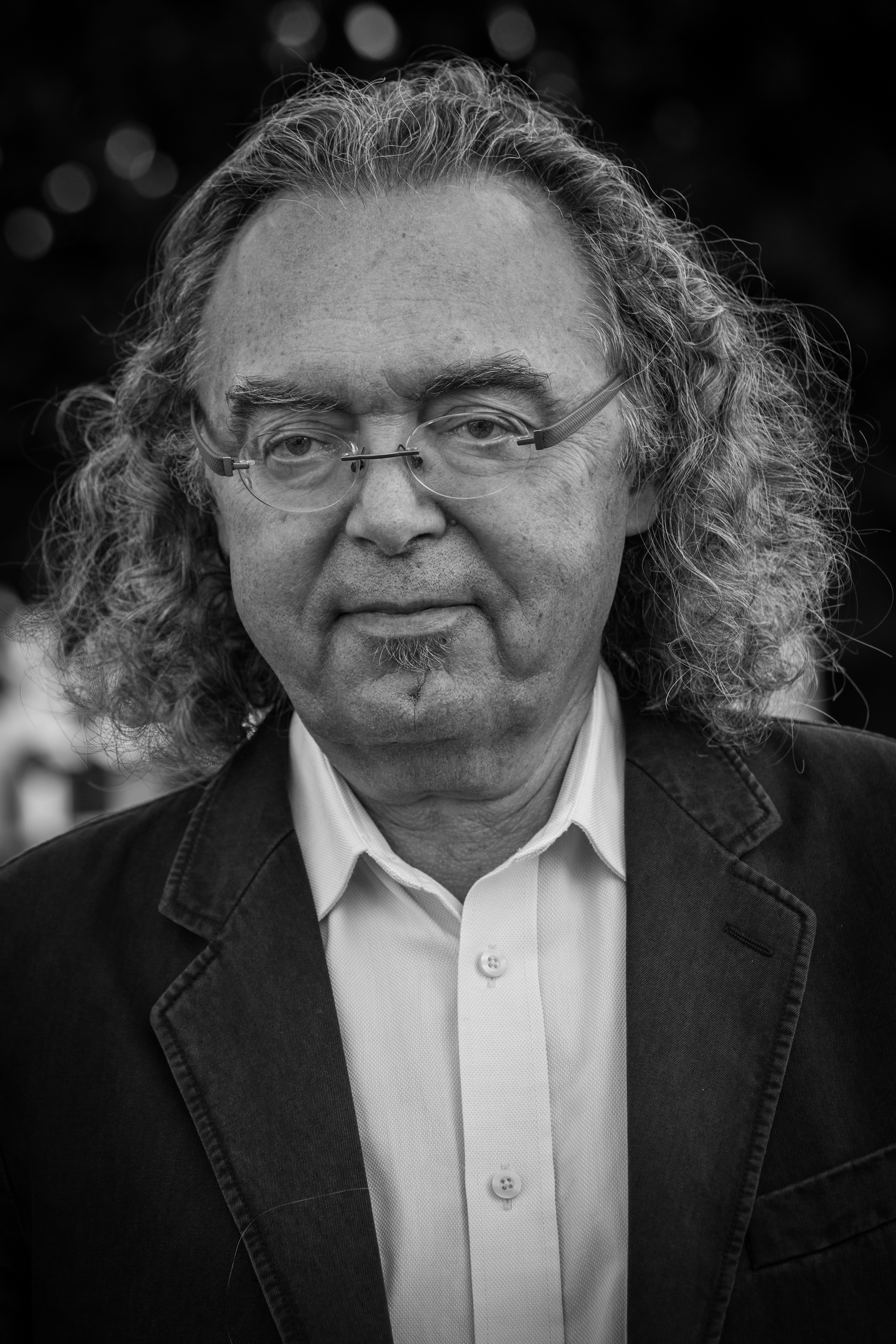
Augustin Berque, September 2014.

Augustin Berque (born 1942 in Rabat, Morocco), is a French geographer, Orientalist and philosopher. He is the son of the famous Egyptologist Jacques Berque. He is professor at the École des hautes études en sciences sociales in Paris (EHESS). His specialist field of interest is Japan.

== Concepts ==
Berque has developed an extensive array of concepts in order to grasp the complex nature of relations between natural and physical objects and the way we conceive of nature. He insists on intermediation, introducing a new concept (Médiance). His more theoretical work relies on the concept of oecumene, which he uses after Plato and quite distinctly from the sense proposed by Derrida. He has also worked on landscapes by comparing the different visions of the world that are mirrored by a specific landscape.

== Major works ==
Augustin Berque's work has not been widely translated into English.

== Publications in French ==
- Le Japon, gestion de l'espace et changement social, Paris, Flammarion, 1976, 340 p.
- La Rizière et la banquise, colonisation et changement culturel à Hokkaidō, Paris, Publications orientalistes de France, 1980, 272 p.
- Vivre l'espace au Japon, Paris, Presses universitaires de France, 1982, 222 p.
- Le Sauvage et l'artifice, les Japonais devant la nature, Paris, Gallimard, 1997 (1986), 314 p.
- Médiance, de milieux en paysages, Paris, Belin/Reclus, 2000 (1990), 161 p.
- Nihon no fūkei, Seiyō no keikan, soshite zōkei no jidai (Le Paysage au Japon, en Europe, et à l'ère du paysagement), Tokyo, Kōdansha, 1990, 190 p.
- Toshi no kosumorojii, Nichi-Bei-ō toshi hikaku (Cosmologie de la ville, comparaison des villes du Japon, des États-Unis et d'Europe), Tokyo, Kodansha, 1993, 236 p.
- Du geste à la cité, Paris, Gallimard, 1993, 264 p.
- Les Raisons du paysage, de la Chine antique aux environnements de synthèse, Paris, Hazan, 1995, 192 p.
- Nihon no fūdosei (La Médiance nippone), Tokyo, NHK Ningen Daigaku, 1995, 130 p. et 2 vidéo-cassettes (total 6 h)
- Être humains sur la Terre, principes d'éthique de l'écoumène, Paris, Gallimard, 1996, 212 p.
- Écoumène, introduction à l'étude des milieux humains, Paris, Belin, 2000, 271 p.
- Les Déserts de Jean Verame, Milan/Paris, Skira/Seuil, 2000, 180 p.
- (entretiens) Toshi, kenchiku kūkan to bashosei (Ville, architecture et sens du lieu), Sendai, Miyagi Daigaku, 2001, 331 p.
- La Pensée paysagère, Paris, Archibooks, 2008 (nouvelle édition: Bastia, Éditions Éoliennes, 2016, 128 p.)
- Histoire de l’habitat ideal. De l’Orient vers l’Occident, Paris, Le Félin, 2010, 399 p.
- Milieu et identité humaine. Notes pour un dépassement de la modernité, Paris, Donner lieu, 2010, 150 p.
- Poétique de la Terre. Histoire naturelle et histoire humaine, essai de mésologie, Paris, Belin, 2014, 237 p.
- La mésologie, pourquoi et pour quoi faire ?, Nanterre La Défense, Presses universitaires de Paris Ouest, 2014, 77 p.
- Formes empreintes, formes matrices, Asie orientale, Franciscopolis éditions, Les presses du réel ISBN 978-2-9544208-5-1, 2015, 63 p.
- Là, sur les bords de l'Yvette – Dialogues mésologiques, Bastia, Éditions Éoliennes, 2017, 120 p.
- Glossaire de mésologie, Bastia, Éditions Éoliennes, 2018, 48 p.
- Descendre des étoiles, monter de la Terre – La Trajection de l’architecture, Bastia, Éditions Éoliennes, 2019, 80 p.
- Dryades & ptérodactyles de la Haute Lande – dessins & légendes –, Paris, Éditions du non-agir, 2021, 96 p.
- Entendre la Terre. À l'écoute des milieux humains. Entretiens avec Damien Deville, postface de Vinciane Despret, Paris, Éditions Le Pommier, 2022, 173 p.
- Recouvrance – Retour à la terre et cosmicité en Asie orientale, Bastia, Éditions Éoliennes, 2022, 520 p.
- Longitudes, Bastia, Éditions Éoliennes, 2024, 160 p.
- La Terre, notre milieu, présenté par Victor Petit, Paris, Presses Universitaires de France, 2025, 112 p.

== Translation (in French) ==
- Watsuji Tetsurō, Fūdo. Le milieu humain, Paris, Éditions du CNRS, 2011, 330 p. (translated and annotated by Augustin Berque).
- Imanishi Kinji, La liberté dans l'évolution. Le vivant comme sujet, Marseille, Éditions Wildproject, 2015, 192 p. (translated and annotated by Augustin Berque).
- Hatakeyama Shigeatsu, La Forêt amante de la mer, Marseille, Éditions Wildproject, 2019, 204 p. (translated and annotated by Augustin Berque).
- Yamauchi Tokuryū, Logos et Lemme. Pensée occidentale, pensée orientale, Paris, Éditions du CNRS, 2020, 498 p. (translated and annotated by Augustin Berque with the assistance of Romaric Jannel).
- Imanishi Kinji, Comment la nature fait science : Entretiens, souvenirs et intuitions, Marseille, Éditions Wildproject, 2022, 280 p. (translated and annotated by Augustin Berque).

== Prizes ==
- 1991: French Geography Society Award for Médiance.
- 1991: Chevalier de l'ordre national du Mérite (Ministry of the Environment).
- 1991: Elected member of the Academia Europaea.
- 1995: Japanese Cultural Creation Prize for his work in landscape theory.
- 1996: Doctorate honoris causa from Kwansei Gakuin University (Japan).
- 1997: Yamagata Bantō Prize for his work in japonology.
- 2000: CNRS silver medal for his work in geography.
- 2006: Cultural prize from the Society of Architects of Japan for his work on housing in Japan.
- 2009: Fukuoka Asian Culture Grand Prize.
- 2011: Japan Foundation Award.
- 2013: National Institutes for the Humanities Award.
- 2013: honoris causa doctorate from the Université Laval (Canada).
- 2015: Order of the Rising Sun, Gold Ray Saltire.
- 2017: honoris causa doctorate from the University of Lausanne (Switzerland).
- 2018: International Cosmos Prize.
