= Pon (surname) =

- Language: Chinese, Tamil, others

Origin
- Meaning: Chinese: a toponymic surname; Tamil: "gold"

Other names
- Variant form: Chinese: Pan

Pon is a surname in various cultures

== Origins ==
Pon may be:

- An English surname, of unexplained origin
- An alternative romanisation of the Chinese surname spelled in Mandarin Pinyin as Pān (潘), which originated as a toponymic surname
- An alternative romanisation of the Chinese surname spelled in Mandarin Pinyin as Pán (盤/盘), which some say originated from Pangu.
- A Tamil name (பொன்), meaning "gold"; Tamils and other peoples of South India traditionally use patronymics rather than surnames

== Statistics ==
In the Netherlands, there were 62 people with the surname Pon and 170 people with the surname Du Pon as of 2007. (See tussenvoegsel.)

The 2010 United States census found 1,419 people with the surname Pon, making it the 19,145th-most-common name in the country, up from 1,298 (19,313rd-most-common) in the 2000 Census. In both censuses, slightly fewer than three-quarters of the bearers of the surname identified as Asian, and between 10% and 15% as White.

== People ==
People with the surname Pon include:

- Ben Pon Sr. (1904–1968), Dutch automotive businessman
- Maurice Pon (1921–2019), French lyricist
- Ben Pon (1936–2019), Dutch vintner, son of Ben Pon Sr.
- Jeff Tien Han Pon (born 1970), American government official
- Josephine Pon (born 1970s), Canadian politician

People with the surname Du Pon include:

- André du Pon (1924–2006), Dutch sailor
- Dorothea du Pon (born 1943), Dutch diver

People with the patronymic Pon (either in full, or as an abbreviation) include:

- Pon Arunachalam (born 1946), Indian writer
- Pon Selvarasa (born 1946), Sri Lankan politician, Member of Parliament
- Pon Sivakumaran (1950–1974), Sri Lankan Tamil militant
- Pon Radhakrishnan (born 1952), Indian politician, member of the Lok Sabha
- Pon Sivapalan (1952–1998), Sri Lankan politician, mayor of Jaffna
- Pon. Muthuramalingam (fl. 1980s), Indian politician, member of the Legislative Assembly of Tamil Nadu
- Pon Navarasu (died 1996), Indian student murdered in a ragging incident
- Pon. Vijayaraghavan (fl. 1970s–1980s), Indian politician, member of the Legislative Assembly of Tamil Nadu
- Pon Kumaran (fl. 2010s), Indian screenwriter and director
- Pon. Raja (fl. 2016), Indian politician, member of the Legislative Assembly of Tamil Nadu
