= Pan En =

Ming-era Chinese politician

Pan En (Chinese: 潘恩; pinyin: Pān Ēn, 1496–1582) was a Ming-era government official from Shanghai. He served under the Jiajing Emperor.

His son, Pan Yunduan, constructed the Yu Garden for him in his old age.
