= Yongmei Pan =

Chinese electrical engineer

Yongmei Pan (Chinese: 潘咏梅, also written as Yong-Mei Pan or Yong Mei Pan) is a Chinese electrical engineer specializing in the design of antennas, including dielectric resonator antennas and filtering antennas. She is a professor in the School of Electronic and Information Engineering at the South China University of Technology in Guangzhou.

== Education and career ==
Pan received a bachelor's degree in electrical engineering and information science from the University of Science and Technology of China in Hefei in 2004, and completed her Ph.D. in electromagnetic field and microwave technology at the same university in 2009.

She was a research fellow in the State Key Laboratory of Terahertz and Millimeter Waves at the City University of Hong Kong, from 2009 until 2013. Meanwhile, she became an associate professor at the South China University of Technology in 2012 and was promoted to full professor in 2014.

== Recognition ==
Pan was the 2022 recipient of the Lot Shafai Mid‐Career Distinguished Achievement Award of the IEEE Antennas and Propagation Society. She was named to the 2026 class of IEEE Fellows, "for contributions to dielectric resonator and filtering antennas".
