= Joseph Poon =

Joseph S. Poon is William Barton Rogers Professor of Physics at the University of Virginia. His research applies physics principles to design, synthesize, and investigate amorphous metals, nano-structured materials, and inter-metallic compounds. For his advances in research on Amorphous metal, he was cited in the "Scientific American 50 Leaders" in 2004. He is an elected Fellow of the American Physical Society.

In 2020, he was awarded the Jesse W. Beams Award for research by the Southeastern section of the American Physical Society.

Poon received his education at the California Institute of Technology, where he got a B.S. and Ph.D. degree in Applied physics.

He has acquired multi-million dollars grants from the Defense Advanced Research Projects Agency for the applications of amorphous metals in defense industry.
