= Yuyuan Tourist Mart =

Chinese retail company

- Type: Public
- Traded as: SSE: 600655; SSE MidCap Component
- Industry: Property management and Retailing
- Founded: 1987
- Headquarters: Huangpu District, Shanghai, China
- Area served: Shanghai
- Key people: Xu Xiaoliang (Chairman); Méi Hongjian (Vice-chairman & President)
- Revenue: ▲CN¥58.15 billion (2023)
- Net income: ▲CN¥2.02 billion (2023)
- Owner: Fosun International (26.45%)
- Number of employees: 14,870
- Footnotes in a consolidated basis; equity and profit excluded minority interests; in Chinese Accounting Standards

Shanghai Yuyuan Tourist Mart Co., Ltd.
- Simplified Chinese: 上海豫园旅游商城股份有限公司
- Traditional Chinese: 上海豫園旅遊商城股份有限公司
Transcriptions

Yuyuan Tourist Mart
- Simplified Chinese: 豫园旅游商城
- Traditional Chinese: 豫園旅遊商城
Transcriptions

Yuyuan Mart
- Simplified Chinese: 豫园商城
- Traditional Chinese: 豫園商城
Transcriptions

Shanghai Yuyuan Tourist Mart Co., Ltd. is the largest retailing conglomerate in China.

The company has presence in a variety of business sectors such as department stores and entertainment shops in Yuyuan Garden, Shanghai, the sales of gold, jade and other jewelry, food and beverages, Chinese pharmaceutical products, souvenirs, antiques, arts and crafts, the provision of property development, property management, import and export trading.

As of 19 November 2016, Yuyuan Tourist Mart is a constituent of SSE 180 Index.

== History ==
Yuyuan Tourist Mart was formerly Yuyuan Shopping Mall, which was not a company but an administrative organization to manage the shops in Yuyuan Garden. In 1980s, some of the shops in there were integrated to form an enterprise. In 1987, Yuyuan Shopping Mall was approved to become the first commercial holding company in Shanghai. In 1988, its shares were listed on the Shanghai Stock Exchange and it was the first listed commercial holding company in China. In 1992, to unify the operations and management of the shopping mall, Shanghai Yuyuan Tourist Mart Co., Ltd. was established and listed on the Shanghai Stock Exchange to replace the old listed company.

In February 2024, the company announced a buyback of 200 million yuan. Shares are used to implement ESOP or to stimulate equity capital.

== Shareholders ==
In 2002, a consortium of Fosun High Technology (90%) and its major shareholder Guangxin Technology (Chinese: 广信科技 for 10%), acquired 20% of shares of Yuyuan Tourist Mart and became the largest shareholder. Fosun High Technology's parent company became Fosun International some time later, as well as Fosun High Technology acquired the 10% stake from Guangxin Technology.

== Gallery ==
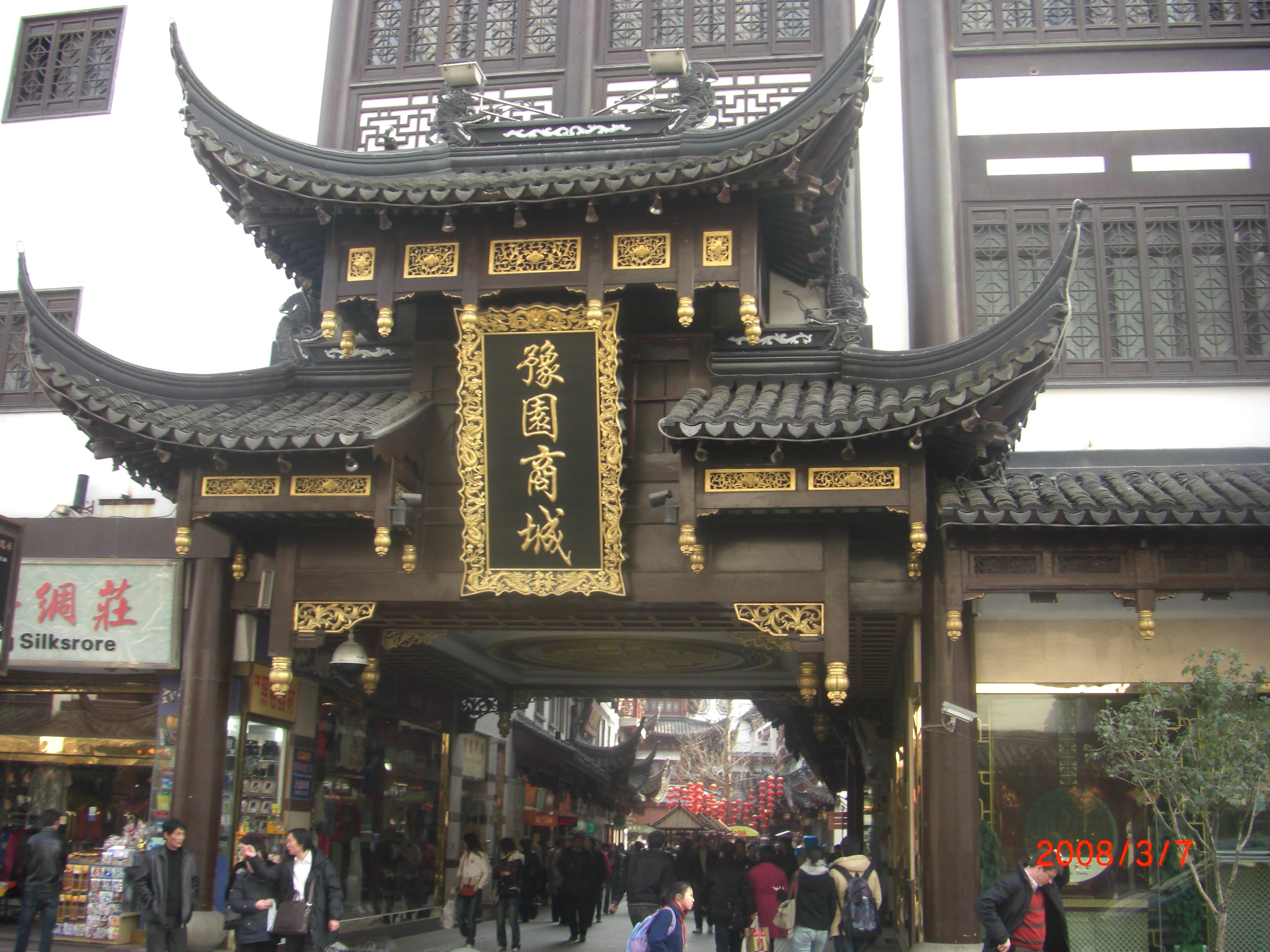

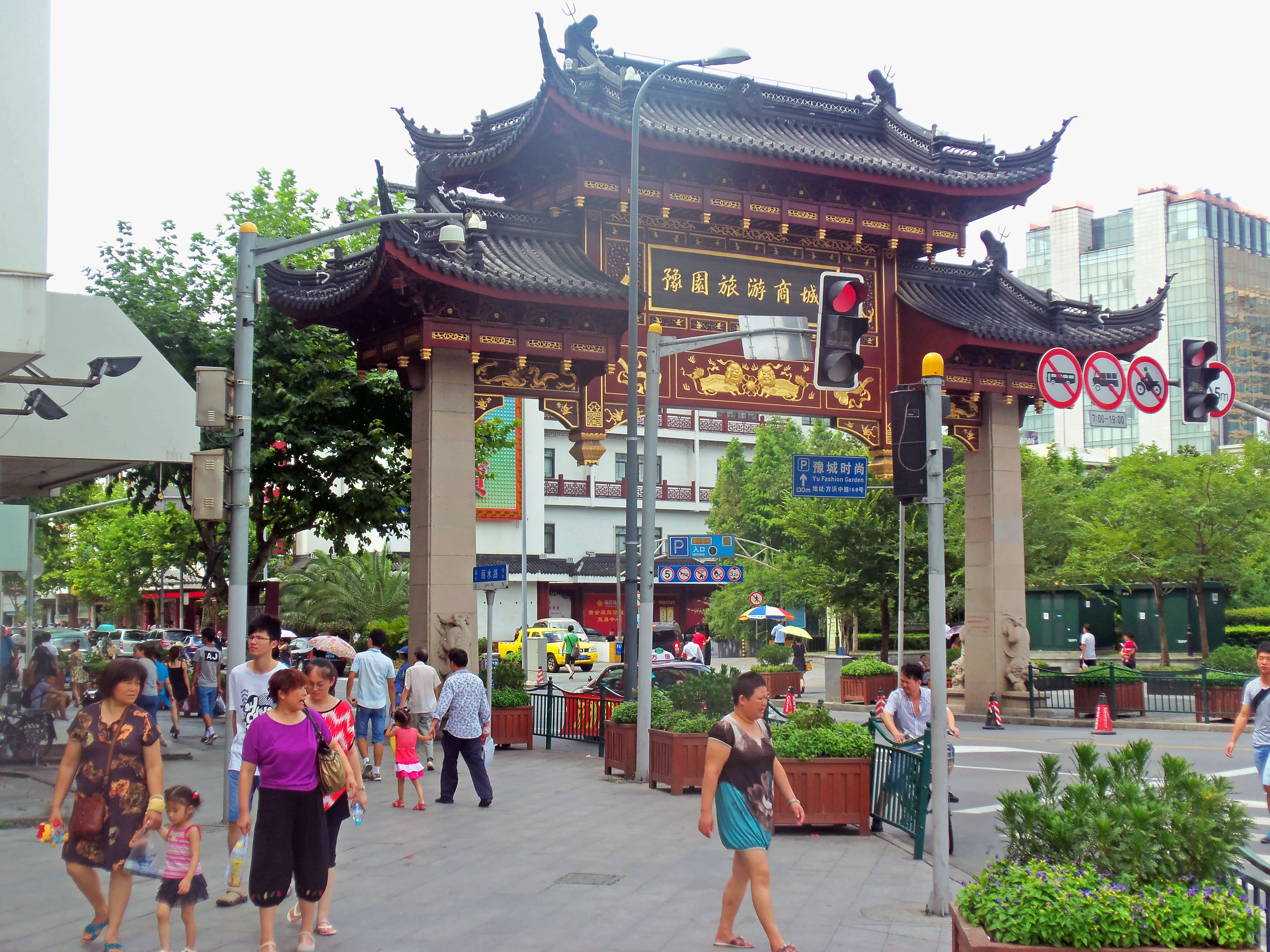
Gate to market by day

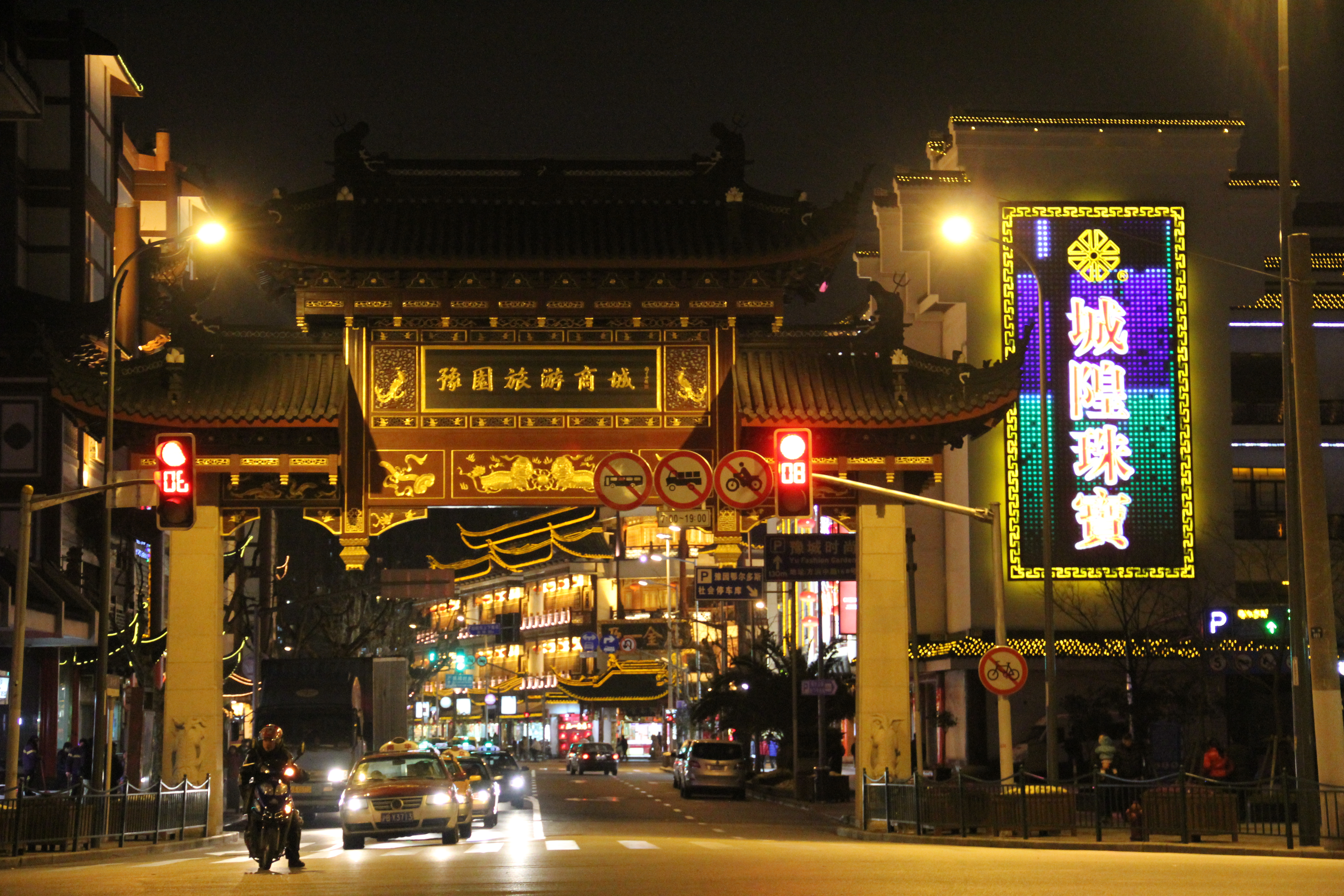
The gate to the Yuyuan market at night

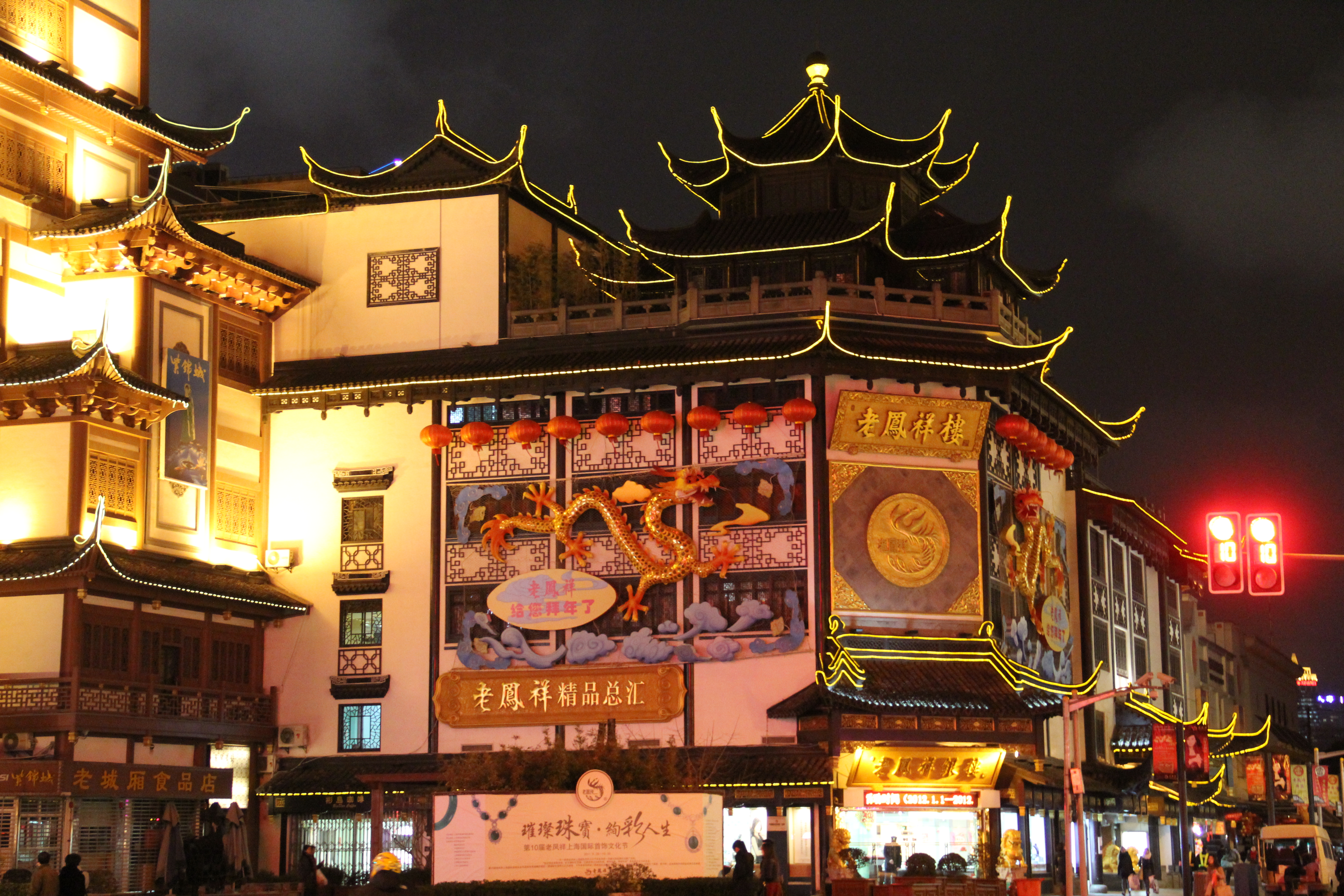
market at night

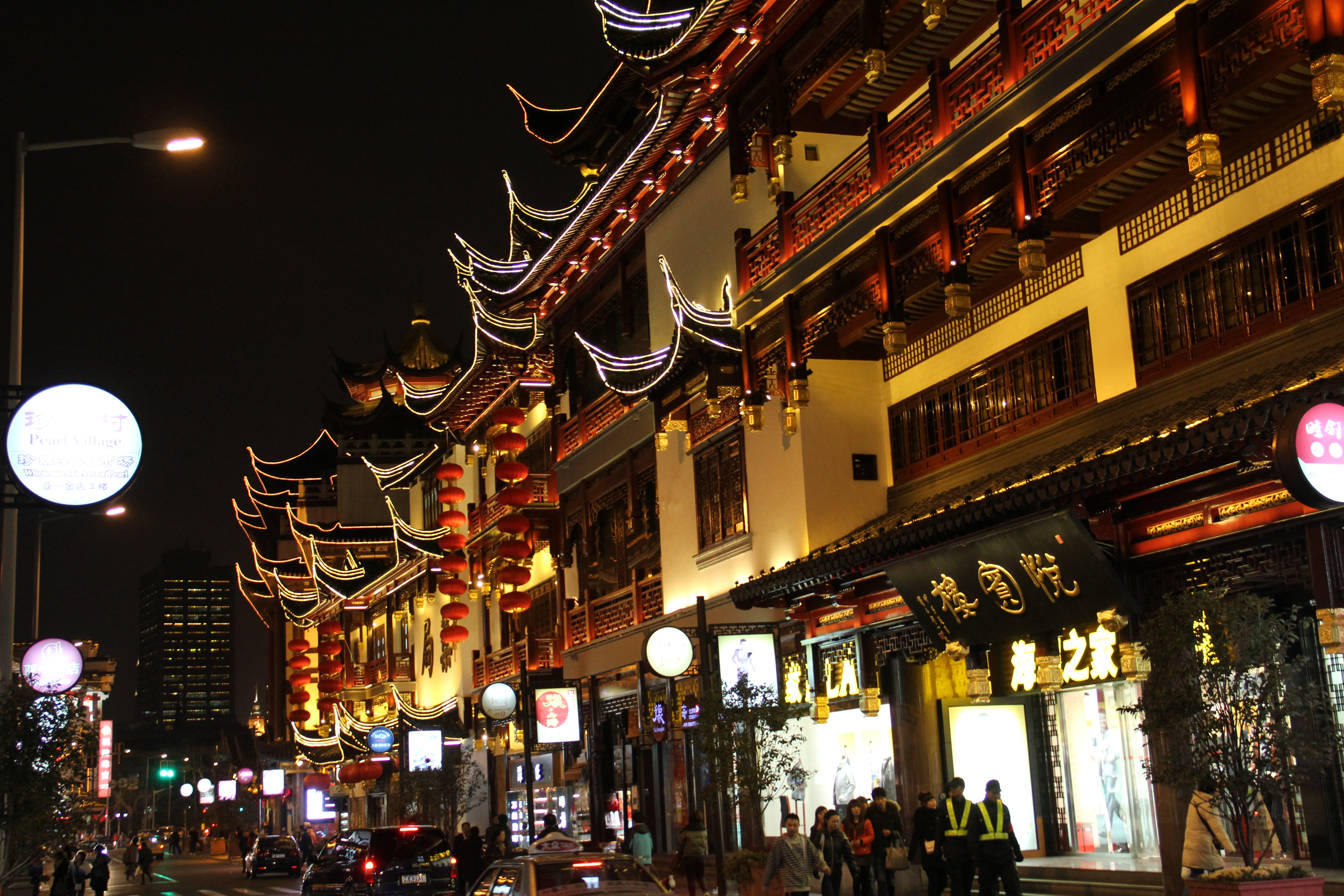
Yuyuan at night

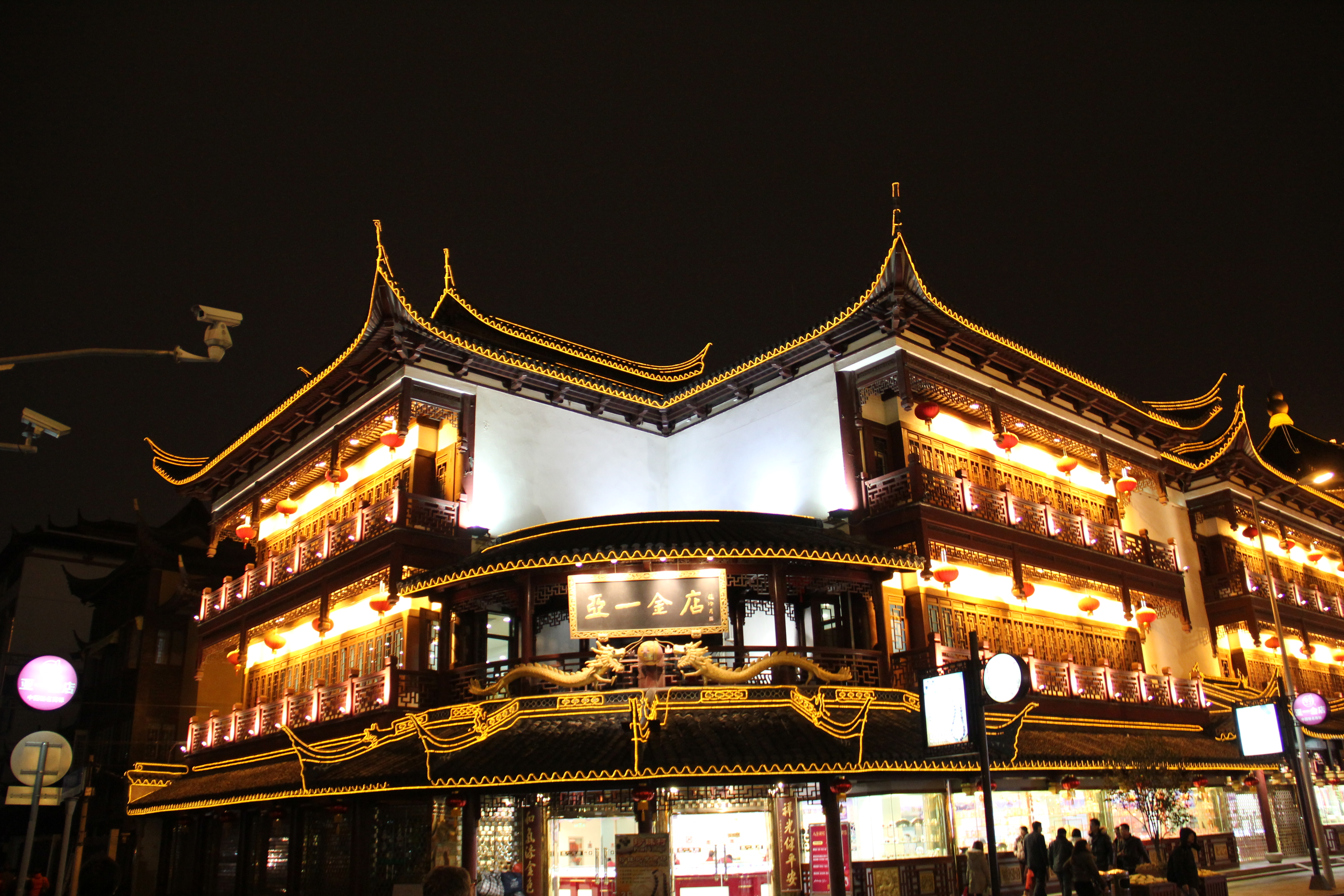
market at night

== See also ==
- Yuyuan Garden
