= Phoa Tjoen Hoay =

Sino-Indonesian journalist (1890–1966)

Phoa Tjoen Hoay (Chinese: 潘春懷; 1890 – 16 October 1966), who sometimes published as T. H. Phoa Jr., was a Chinese Indonesian, Malay language journalist, translator, and newspaper editor active in the Dutch East Indies in the early twentieth century. He translated a number of Chinese and European works into Malay, including seven volumes of Sherlock Holmes by Arthur Conan Doyle.

== Biography ==
Phoa Tjoen Hoay was born in Bogor, Buitenzorg Residency, Dutch East Indies (today Bogor, Indonesia) in 1890. He came from an elite Peranakan Chinese family in Buitenzorg; his father was a Kapitan Cina (Dutch-appointed Chinese community representative) and his older brother Phoa Tjoen Hoat also became a journalist. Little is known about Phoa's early life or education, although he seems to have had a European education and could read and write in Dutch, English, and French and possibly written Chinese, as well as Malay.

He began working as a translator in around 1904, translating Chinese detective novels into Malay. He also translated from European languages; in 1907 he published a Malay translation of Alexandre Dumas fils's La Dame aux Camélias in serialized form in Li Po. Over the next two decades he translated a number of other works from Chinese, French and English into Malay, including seven volumes of Sherlock Holmes printed in 1914, and English and German adventure novels by writers such as H. Rider Haggard.

He seems to have become a journalist around 1909, at the start of a huge boom in new Malay-language newspapers and a growth of readership due to the expansion of literacy among the non-European population. He became editor of the short-lived Malay edition of a Chinese magazine in Batavia called Hoa To. By 1911, he had relocated to Semarang in Central Java and became editor of the daily newspaper Warna Warta. That same year, he was summoned before the public prosecutor in Batavia for an article he had printed in Hoa To the year before. In the piece, he had stated that young Chinese in the Indies should go to school to learn Chinese, and then English, a world language, rather than learn Dutch, a language only spoken in a small corner of the world. He also thought that the push to build Dutch-language schools for Chinese children (Hollandsch Chineesche School) was part of an intentional campaign to turn the Chinese community away from Chinese nationalism. He was charged with sedition and subversion of authority, and causing hatred between Dutch and Chinese, he was given an extremely harsh punishment of six months of forced labour. Public opinion was shocked by this heavy sentence, and petitions were sent to the Governor-general of the Dutch East Indies; but the sentence was upheld, although he ended up serving part of his sentence in prison rather than at hard labour. In 1912, while still serving his sentence, he was caught by guards with some newspapers in his possession. He was sentenced to 8 days of solitary confinement and three months without any visitors.

After his release in 1912 he became the editor of a weekly publication in Batavia called Hindia. In 1915, he became editor-in-chief at Sinar Sumatra in Padang, a role he apparently held remotely and which he retained on and off until the late 1920s. In 1916, he became editor at Perniagaan, which his brother had edited previously. In 1917 he became editor of two publications printed in Pekalongan in Central Java; one was a daily called Jih Pao and the other was a weekly called Perdamaian. In 1919, he was also made editor-in-chief at Warna Warta, although only for a short time. He continued to publish translations and work as a journalist in the 1920s; in 1926 he was director of the Asia Press Bureau in Batavia. In early 1929, he finally retired from his longstanding editor position at Sinar Sumatra in Padang.

After the 1920s, it is unclear what he did. He died on 16 October 1966 in Bogor, Indonesia.

== Selected works ==
- Marguerite Gauthier (1907, serialized in Li Po, a translation of Alexandre Dumas fils' La Dame aux Camelias)
- Tjerita 'Sasoedahnja kaja baroe beroentoeng'. Tjerita ini dengan sasoengoehnja soedah melakoeken djalannja di Tiongkok (1909, possibly a translation of a Chinese novel, published by Tjiong Koen Bie in Batavia)
- Tjerita dasaran djodonja. Satoe tjerita dari binoewa Duitschland jang kedjadian pada abad ka 18. (1911, 2 volumes apparently translated from a European language)
- Tjerita ampir loepet menika atawa doewa nona moeda, Siotjia Liem Soeij Nio dan Liem Kiem Nio doewa soedara piatoe jang hidoep roekoen satoe sama lain (1912, possibly a translation of a Chinese novella, published by Tjiong Koen Bie in Batavia)
- Hikajat tangannja Allah. Satoe tjerita di Afrika (1914, a translation of H. Rider Haggard's She: A History of Adventure, published by Tjiong Koen Liong in Batavia)
- Riwajat Sherlock Holmes, karangan A. Conan Doyle (1914, 7 or more volumes of translations of Sherlock Holmes books published by Tjiong Koen Bie in Batavia)
- Tjerita korban ajahnja sendiri atawa membentji dengan keliroe (1925, 3 volumes which may be translations of Chinese novels, printed by Lie Tek Long in Batavia)
- Terbitnja Matahari di benoea Tiongkok (c. 1910)
- Wetboek tentang oeroesar perniaga'an jang berlakoe dalam Hindia Ollanda, tersalin dengan menoeroet djalan jang paling gampang ka dalam bahasa Melajoe (1912–14, 3 volumes published by Tjiong Koen Bie in Batavia)
