= Phan Nguyên Hồng =

Vietnamese academic

Phan Nguyên Hồng (Đức Thọ, 1935) is a Vietnamese academic who is a leading authority on the mangrove ecosystem in Asia, and was awarded the 2008 International Cosmos Prize in recognition of his work.

Hồng has been involved in comprehensive scientific research in Vietnam, where war and overdevelopment have had a devastating impact on its mangrove ecosystem. He has made a major contribution to the restoration of the mangrove forests. The Can Gio district, in particular, is an unprecedented example of the successful restoration and conservation of a mangrove forest.

== Education and career ==
- Education
  1956 B.Sc., Hanoi Pedagogic University
  1964 M.Sc. in Ecology, HUE
  1970 PhD, Hanoi University of Education
- Employment
  1980－1991 Associate Professor of Hanoi University of Education
  1991－2007 Professor of HNUE
  1987－1994 Director of the Mangrove Ecosystem Research Centre (MERC), Hanoi University of Education (HUE)
  1995－2002 Vice Director, Centre for Natural Resources & Environmental Studies (CRES), Vietnam National University, Hanoi (VNU)
  2003－2007 Director of the Mangrove Ecosystem Research Centre (MERC), Hanoi University of Education (HUE)
- Honors
  1997 People Teacher Title by the President of Vietnam
  2000 Labour Award (1st level) rewarded by the President and Prime Minister of S.R. Vietnam
  2005 Environment Prize rewarded by Ministry of Natural Resources &Environment.
- Publications
  1993 The Mangroves of Vietnam
  2000 Ecological study of mangrove forest in Can Gio, Ho Chi Minh C City, Vietnam
  2002 Mangrove Ecosystem in the Red River Coastal Zone –Biodiversity, Ecology, Socio-Economics, Management and Education
  2006 The role of mangroves and coral reef ecosystems in natural disaster mitigation and coastal life improvement
