= Phoa Tjoen Hoat =

Sino-Indonesian journalist and editor (1883–1931)

Phoa Tjoen Hoat (Chinese: 潘春發; 1883 – 31 October 1931), who also published under the name Th. H. Phoa Sr., was a Chinese Indonesian, Malay language journalist, translator and newspaper editor active in the Dutch East Indies in the early twentieth century.

== Biography ==
Phoa Tjoen Hoat was born in Buitenzorg, Dutch East Indies in 1883. His father was the Kapitan Cina (Dutch-appointed representative of the Chinese community) in Buitzenzorg and his brother Phoa Tjoen Hoay also became a journalist. Little is known about his early life and education, although he was clearly fluent in Dutch and possibly French as well.

In 1905, Phoa became editor of Perniagaan, an important and politically conservative Chinese-owned Malay language newspaper of its time. By 1906, he was also editor of another paper in Batavia, Bintang Batavia. He became involved in journalists' organizations, and in 1906 became secretary of a Malay Journalist's Union (Dutch: Maleische Journalistenkring) founded by F. D. J. Pangemanann and a mix of European, Indo and Chinese editors.

He also became an editor at Warna Warta in Semarang in around 1907; he seem to have relocated to that city from Batavia at around that time. Early in his tenure there he was called to court over a Persdelict (press offense) charge for having printed something considered slanderous of Oei Moh Sing, a local Chinese notable.

In around 1907, he also launched a magazine Insulinde published in Semarang which appeared three times per month. However, it was not successful and folded in early 1908. After that, he launched yet another paper in Semarang called Bintang Pagi (Early morning)

Phoa's ideas were fairly conservative; he supported Sun Yat-sen and published materials opposing the Sarekat Islam, the mass anti-colonial movement in Java. He printed materials condemning the Qing dynasty in Dutch newspapers at around this time and lamenting the situation of overseas Chinese citizens who were subjects of such a despotic regime. In 1908, he also petitioned the government to grant him legal status as a European rather than as a "Foreign Oriental", the normal status of Indies Chinese.

In 1914, he was promoted to editor-in-chief Warna Warta. Between 1916 and 1918, he was editor-in-chief of Sinar Sumatra, a newspaper in Padang; he may have acted in that role while still living in Java, which was common enough at that time, since he was still working for Warna Warta. In around 1920, he entered municipal politics, being elected to local council in Semarang. In 1922, he became editor-in-chief of another newspaper named Kong Po. After that he relocated to Bandung, although the circumstances are unclear, and entered municipal politics there.

He seems to have retired from writing and public activities around 1923, the year he resigned his municipal post in Bandung and apparently published his last book. His obituaries wrote about a long illness towards the end of his life. His place and date of death are given either as 1928 or 1931; the historian Claudine Salmon stated that he died in Gresik Regency, East Java in 1928. Obituaries in 1931 refer to false reports of his death in newspapers in previous years which may account for this date. He seems to have actually passed away in Jember Regency on 31 October 1931.

== Selected publications ==
- Apa jang bangsa Tionghoa (Han Djin) haroes taoe. Bagimana aken kesoedahannja dengan Tiongkok, terkarang oleh Dr Sun Yat Sen, pemimpin dari pakoempoelan Kek Beng Tong dan disalin oleh Phoa Tjoen Hoat & Yap Soeij Tjhiang (1906-7, serialized in Darmo Kondo, translated works of Sun Yat Sen)
- Oeroesan Tiong-kok, 15 tahon di moeka (1909)
- Setan Item (1912, serialized in Warna Warta, a novel criticizing the Sarekat Islam.)
- Tjerita Controleur Malheure (1912, appeared serialized in Sin Po)
- Ah soeda sakep. Tjoe Ka lam satoe journalist jang djadi milicien (1918, printed in Semarang by Hap Sing Kong Sie)
- 51 Million Franc (translation of a French novel, appeared serialized partly in Warna Warta and partly in Tjhoen Tjhioe.)
- Asal sadja maoe, moesti bisa (1923, printed in Cilacap by Hok Hoo)
