= Pan Yunduan =

Chinese politician (1526–1601)

Pan Yunduan (Chinese: 潘允端, Pān Yǔnduān) (1526-1601) was a Ming-era governor of Sichuan from Shanghai.

He constructed the original Yu Garden for his father, Pan En, between 1559 and 1577. His granddaughter's husband, Zhang Zhaolin (张肇林, Zhāng Zhàolín), eventually inherited it after his death.
