= Yu Garden =

Extensive Chinese garden in Shanghai

Coordinates: 31°13′45″N 121°29′15″E

- 豫园
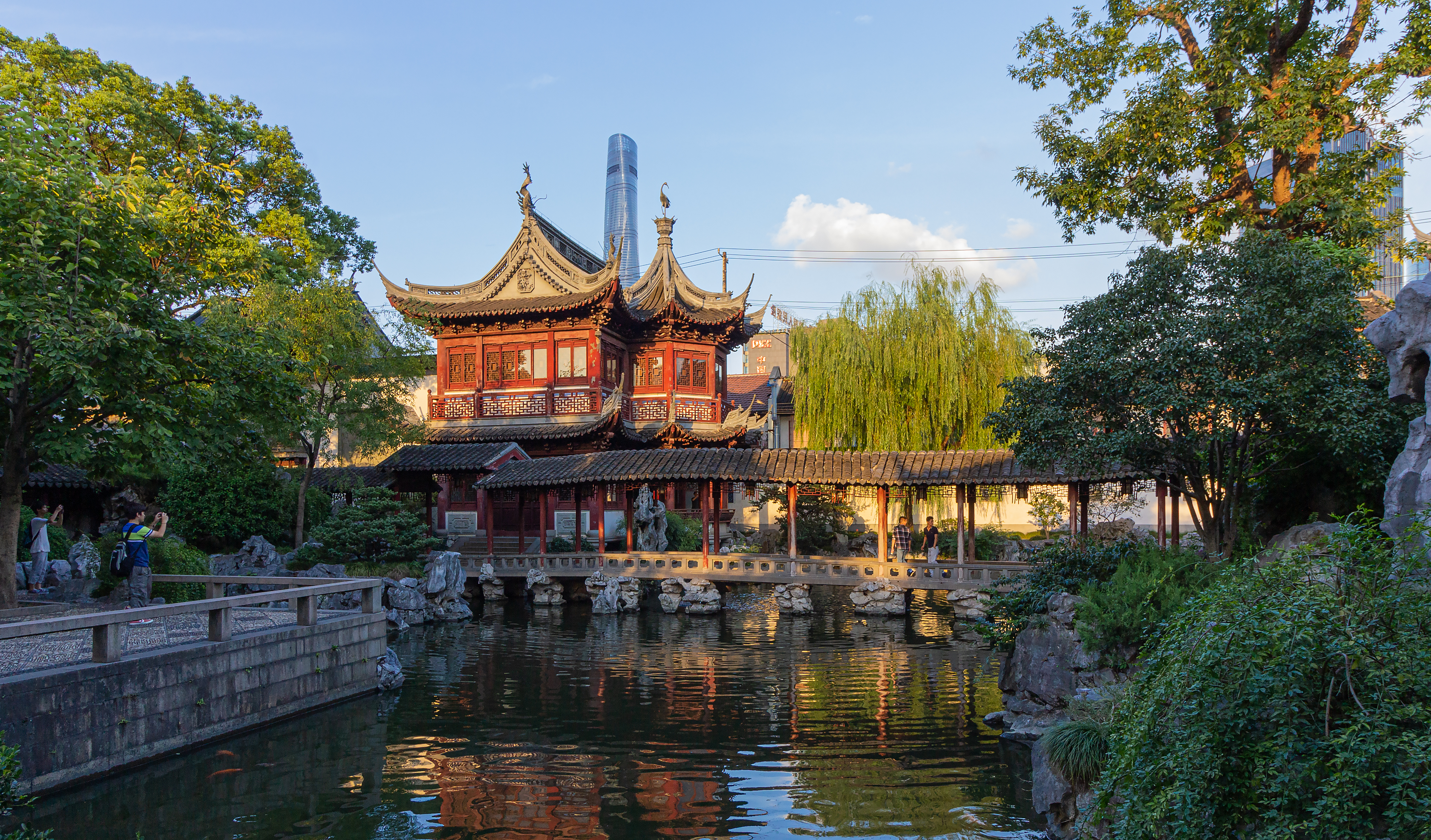
- Interactive map of Yu Garden
- Location: Shanghai, China
- Created: 1577; 449 years ago

Yu Garden or Yuyuan Garden (traditional Chinese: 豫園; simplified Chinese: 豫园; pinyin: Yù Yuán, Shanghainese Yuyoe Wu Chinese pronunciation: [ɦy²².ɦɥø⁵⁵], lit. Garden of Happiness) is an extensive Chinese garden located beside the City God Temple in the northeast of the Old City of Shanghai at Huangpu District, Shanghai. It abuts the Yuyuan Tourist Mart, the Huxinting Teahouse and the Yu Garden Bazaar.

This garden is accessible from the Shanghai Metro's Line 10 and Line 14 at Yuyuan Garden station.

Boasting over 40 scenic spots, including pavilions, rock formations, and ponds, it is now a key site under state-level protection.

A centerpiece is the Exquisite Jade Rock (玉玲珑) a porous 3.3-m, 5-ton boulder. Rumours about its origin include the story that it was meant for the Huizong Emperor (Northern Song dynasty from 1100 to 1126 AD) the imperial garden in Bianjing, but was salvaged from the Huangpu River after the boat carrying it had sunk.

== History ==
Yu Garden was first built in 1559 during the Ming dynasty by Pan Yunduan as a comfort for his father, the minister Pan En, in his old age. Pan Yunduan began the project after failing one of the imperial exams. He named the garden Yu Yuan, yu (豫) meaning "pleasing and satisfying to one's parents." His motivation to build this garden was to show filial piety to his parents and give them enjoyment in their old age. Thus, Yu Garden is also known as "Garden of Peace and Comfort". However, Yunduan's appointment as governor of Sichuan postponed construction for nearly twenty years until 1577.

In its original form, Yu Garden has many manufactured waterways, paths, rockeries, plants and buildings. The grounds were designed to be a complex of different gardens within one centre, Leshou Tang. From Pan's own records, the garden served as hub for many social activities when he lived there, and those events influenced the texture of Shanghai society. In particular, of Pan Yuduan's journal entries from 1586 through 1601, nearly three quarters of them are related to various public performances that were held in the garden, with the Leshou Tang being the main venue for these events. The garden was the largest and most prestigious of its era in Shanghai, but eventually its expense helped ruin the Pans.

The garden was later inherited by Zhang Zhaolin, Pan Yunduan's granddaughter's husband, and then passed to different owners. A section was briefly organised by Zhang Shengqu as the "Academy of Purity and Harmony" (清和書院, Qīng-Hé Shūyuàn) and the Ling Yuan (靈苑, Líng Yuàn, lit. "Spirit Park"), today's East Garden, was purchased by a group of local leaders in 1709. A group of merchants renovated the increasingly decrepit grounds in 1760 and in 1780 the West Garden was opened to the general public.

The gardens suffered damage numerous times during the 19th century. During the First Opium War, the British army used the Huxinting Teahouse as a base of operations for several days in 1842. During the Taiping Rebellion, the Small Swords Society ran its headquarters in the Dianchun Hall; by the time Qing troops recovered the garden, the original structures had nearly all been destroyed. They were damaged again by the Japanese in 1942 before being repaired by Liangshun Han (Rockery Han) appointed by the Shanghai government from 1956 to 1961. They were opened to the public in 1961 and declared a national monument in 1982.

== Design ==
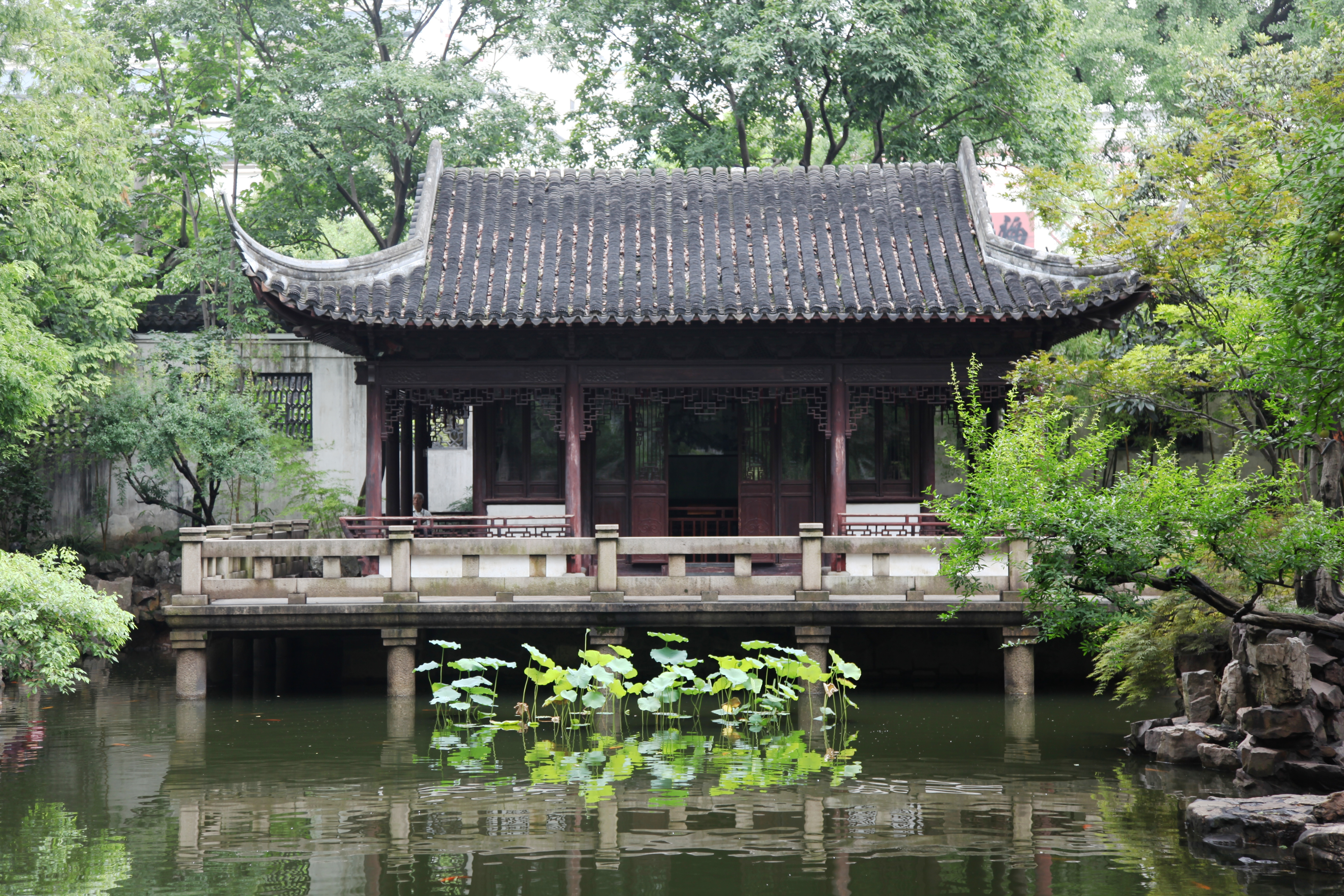
The Nine Lion Study, 2009.

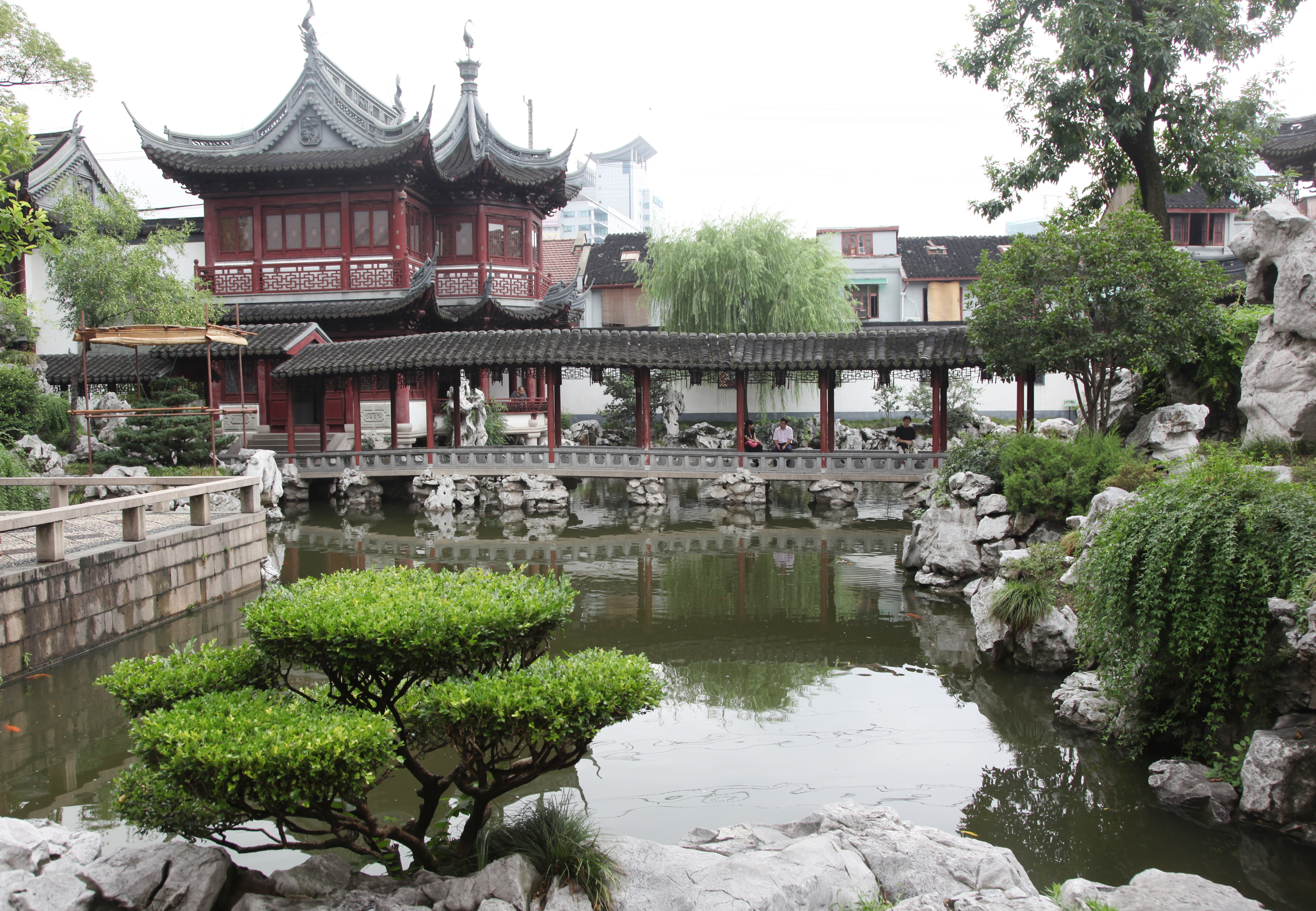
Another view of the Pavilion of Listening to Billows, 2009.

Today, Yu Garden occupies an area of 2 hectares (5 acres).The approach to the garden is across a Nine-turn bridge crossing a small pond with a teahouse. The entrance is off the forecourt at the end of the bridge. Yu Garden reflects the garden style of Jiangnan garden architecture in the Ming and Qing dynasties. It perfectly blends decorative halls, elaborate pavilions, glittering ponds, zigzag bridges, archways, and exquisite rockeries.

Yu Garden is divided into six general areas laid out in the Suzhou style:

- Sansui Hall (三穗堂, Sān Suì Táng, lit. "Three Tassel Hall") – includes the Grand Rockery (大假山, Dà Jiǎshān ), a 12-meter-high rockery made of huangshi stone, featuring peaks, cliffs, winding caves, and gorges. This scenery was possibly created by Zhang Nanyang during the Ming dynasty.
- Wanhua Chamber (万花楼, Wàn Huā Lóu, lit. "Chamber of the Ten Thousand Flowers") – includes Wanhua Chamber, Yule Pavilion, Double Lane Corridor and Ginkgo Tree of 400 years old staking out the front courtyard.
- Dianchun Hall (点春堂, Diǎn Chūn Táng, lit. "Heralding Spring Hall") – built in 1820, the first year of the Daoguang Emperor; served as the base of the Small Swords Society from September 1853 to February 1855.
- Huijing Hall (会景楼, Huì Jǐng Lóu) – includes Jade Water Corridor, Three-Turn Bridge, Nine Lion Study.
- Yuhua Hall (玉华堂, Yù Huá Táng, lit. "Jade Magnificence Hall") – furnished with rosewood pieces from the Ming dynasty, shares its name with a mountain near Xinye in Zhejiang.
- Inner Garden (内园, Nèi Yuán) – rockeries, ponds, pavilions, and towers; first laid out in 1709 and more recently recreated in 1956 by combining its east and west gardens.

Each area is separated from the others by "dragon walls" with undulating gray tiled ridges, with the gateways and zigzag corridors connecting each other.

What's more, each subgarden represents a unique subtopic and corresponding storylines, which indicates the designer's deep feeling and personal stories through the arrangement of different elements inside each subgarden. In the most original form of Yu Garden, Sansui Hall represents the subtopic of harvest and long-living; Wanhua Chamber represents the subtopic of flowers and stones; Dianchun Hall represents the subtopic of spring and sunlight, and it was used for musical performances; Yuhua Hall represents the subtopic of wealth, and it was designed as Pan Yunduan's studio; Huijing Hall represents the subtopic of joy and glory, and it was designed for enjoying the waterscape and the whole scene. These sub-topics are derived from the main theme of the garden----'peace and pleasure'; meanwhile, they develop their own stories, and they together manifest the main theme of the garden.

=== Features ===
- Sansui Hall
- Yangshan Hall
- Huge Rockery
- Cuixui Hall
- Relaxation Stone Boat
- Yule Pavilion
- Double Lane Corridor
- Wanhua Chamber
- Ginkgo Tree
- Nine Lion Study
- Ancient Well Pavilion
- Relic Hall
- Dianchun Hall
- Acting and Singing Stage
- Kuailou Pavilion
- Hexu Hall
- Huijing Tower
- Toasting Pavilion
- Yuhua Hall
- Deyue Chamber
- Jade
- Exquisite Jade Rock
- Huanlong Bridge
- Inner Garden
- Jingguan Tower
- Guantao Tower
- Dress Circle
- Keyl Hal
- Stone Boat
- Big Stage
- Mid-Lake Pavilion
- Nine Zigzag Bridge
- Master Lao Hall
- Ting Tao Tower Exhibit Hall
- Hanbi Tower

== Surroundings ==
The garden is surrounded by city god temple and Yuyuan Bazaar. Yuyuan Bazaar is located right next to Yu Garden, with Chinese architecture and design coupled with hundreds of shops selling pieces of jewelry, silk, antiques, arts, crafts, souvenirs, and local snacks. Throughout the years, Yu Garden has maintained a delicate balance between scholarly elegance and gaudy consumerism from its earliest days, and it has served as the stage on which the drama of the Pan family and the drama of the people of Shanghai have been performed.

== Gallery ==
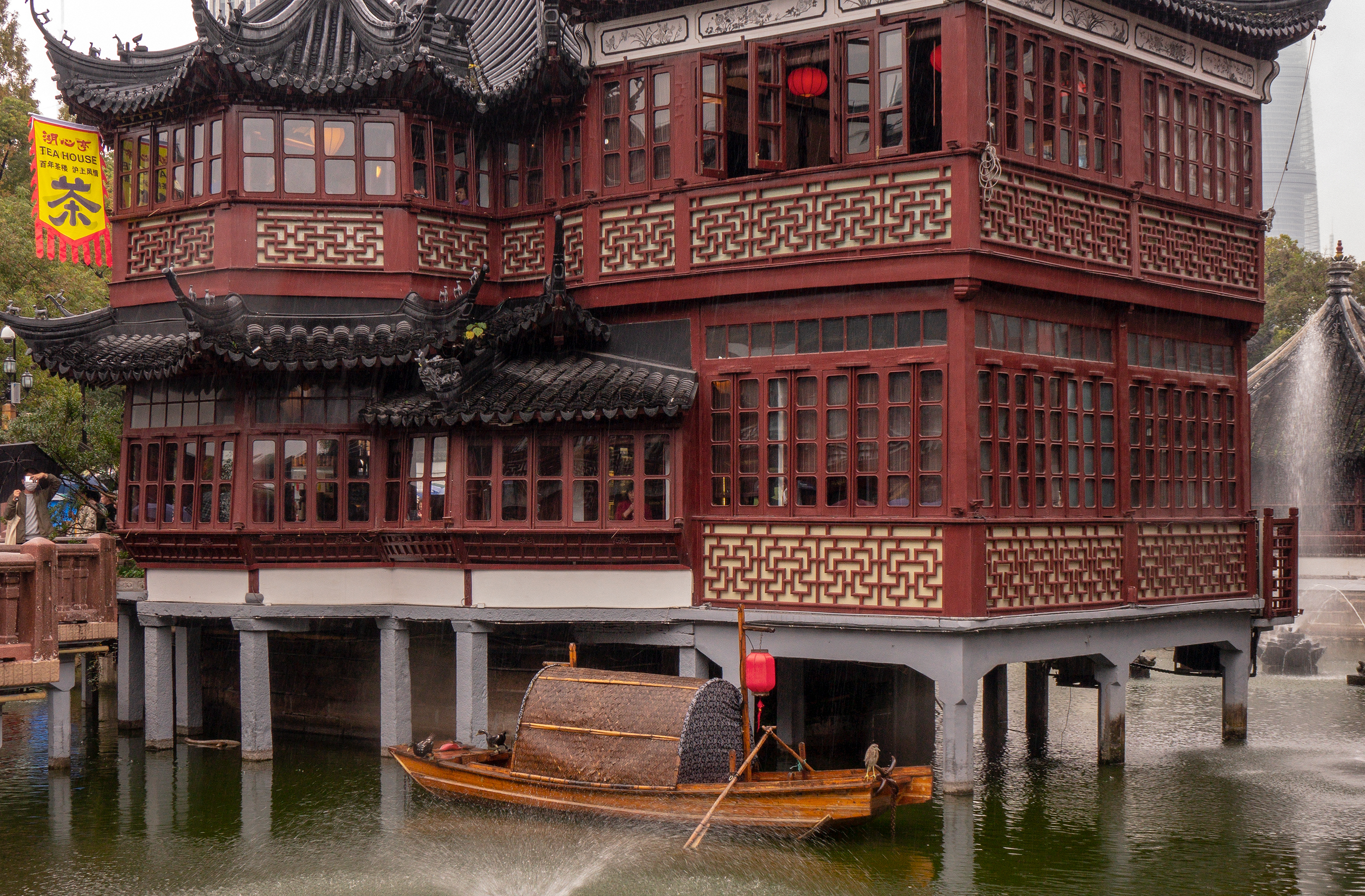
Built in 1855, the Huxinting Teahouse at the Yu Garden pond remains in use in 2018

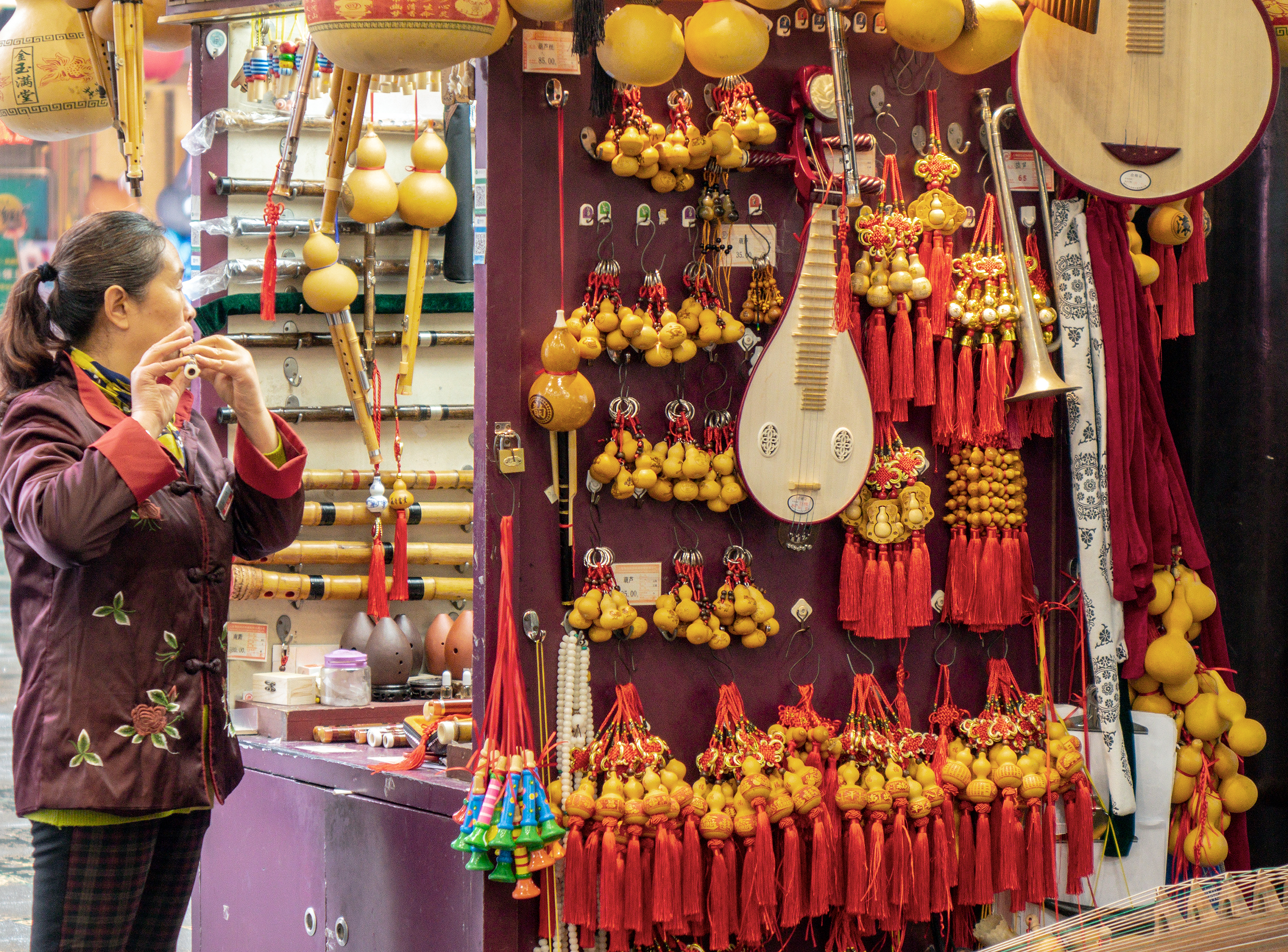
A vendor at the Yuyuan Bazaar near Yu Garden, 2018

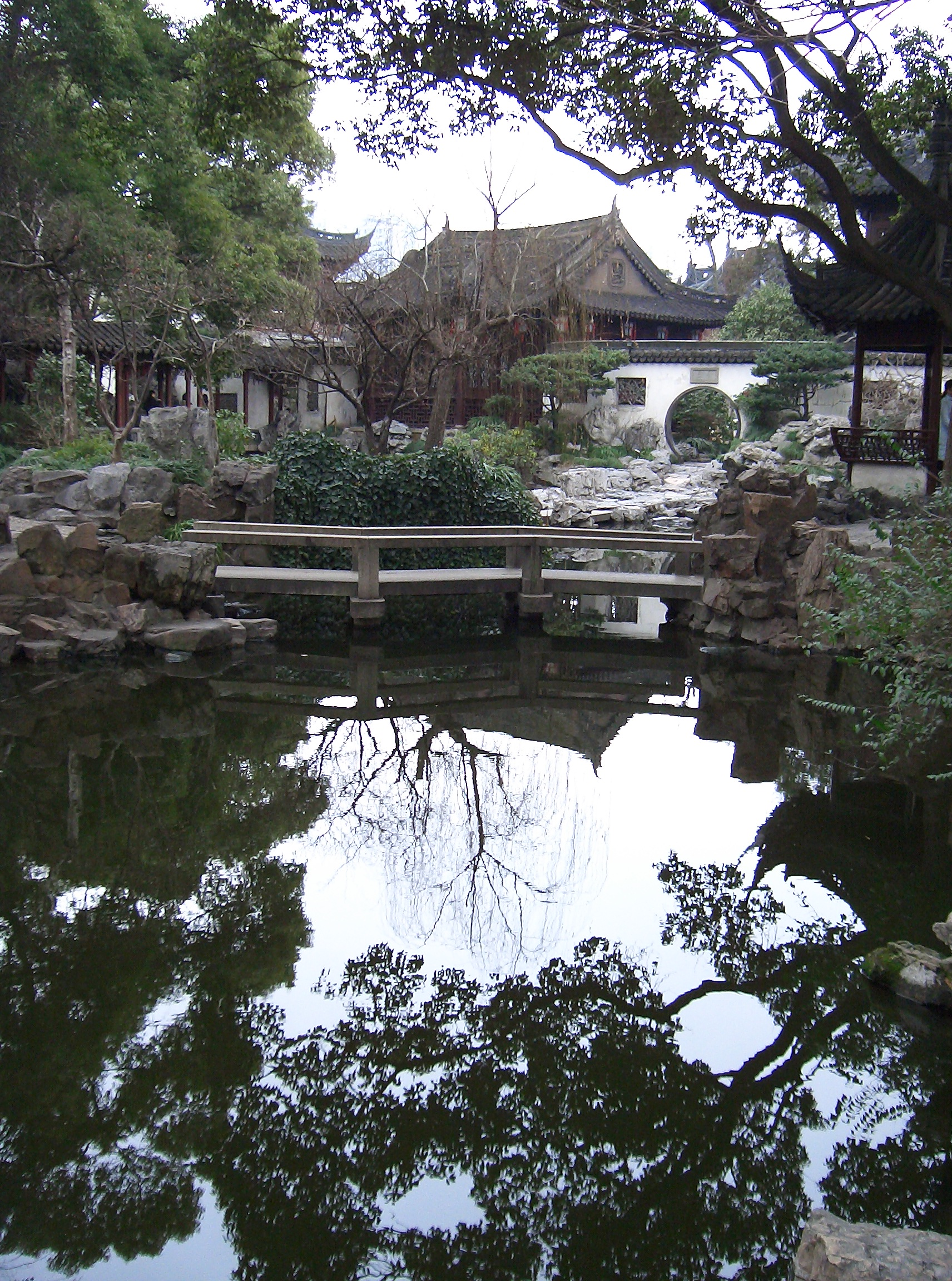
Crooked bridge & rounded gate

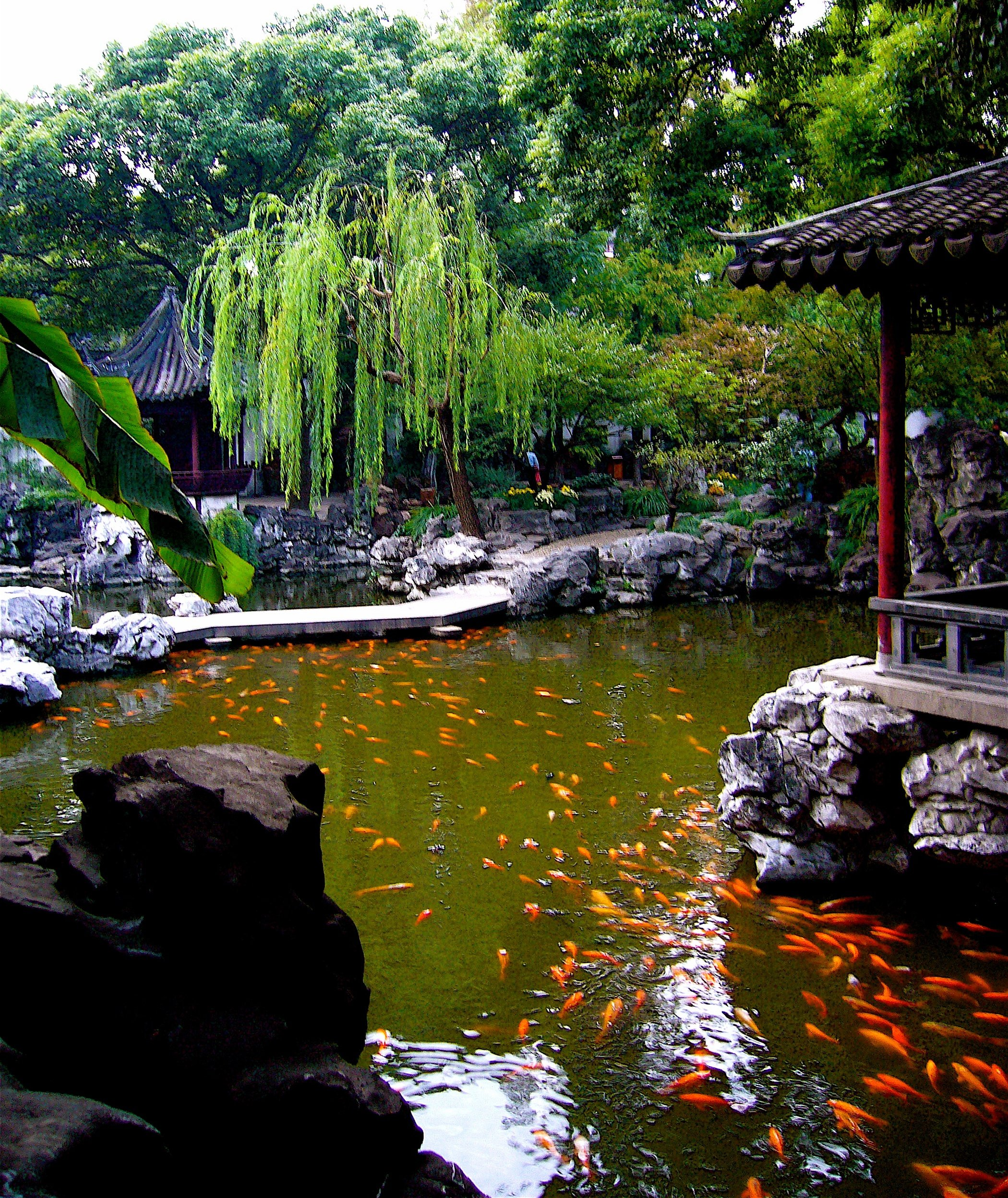
Koi in the large pond

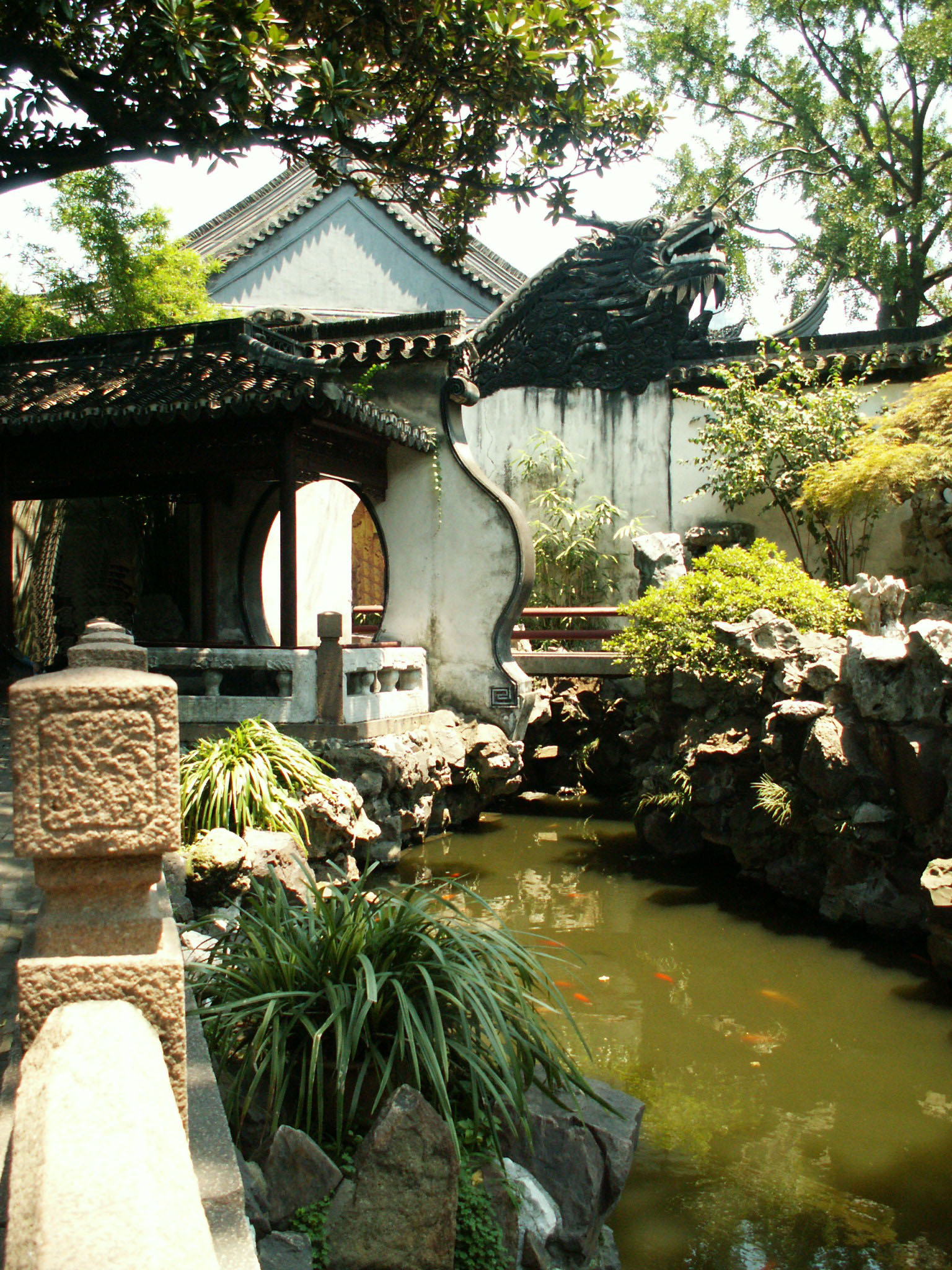
One of the dragon wall end-pieces

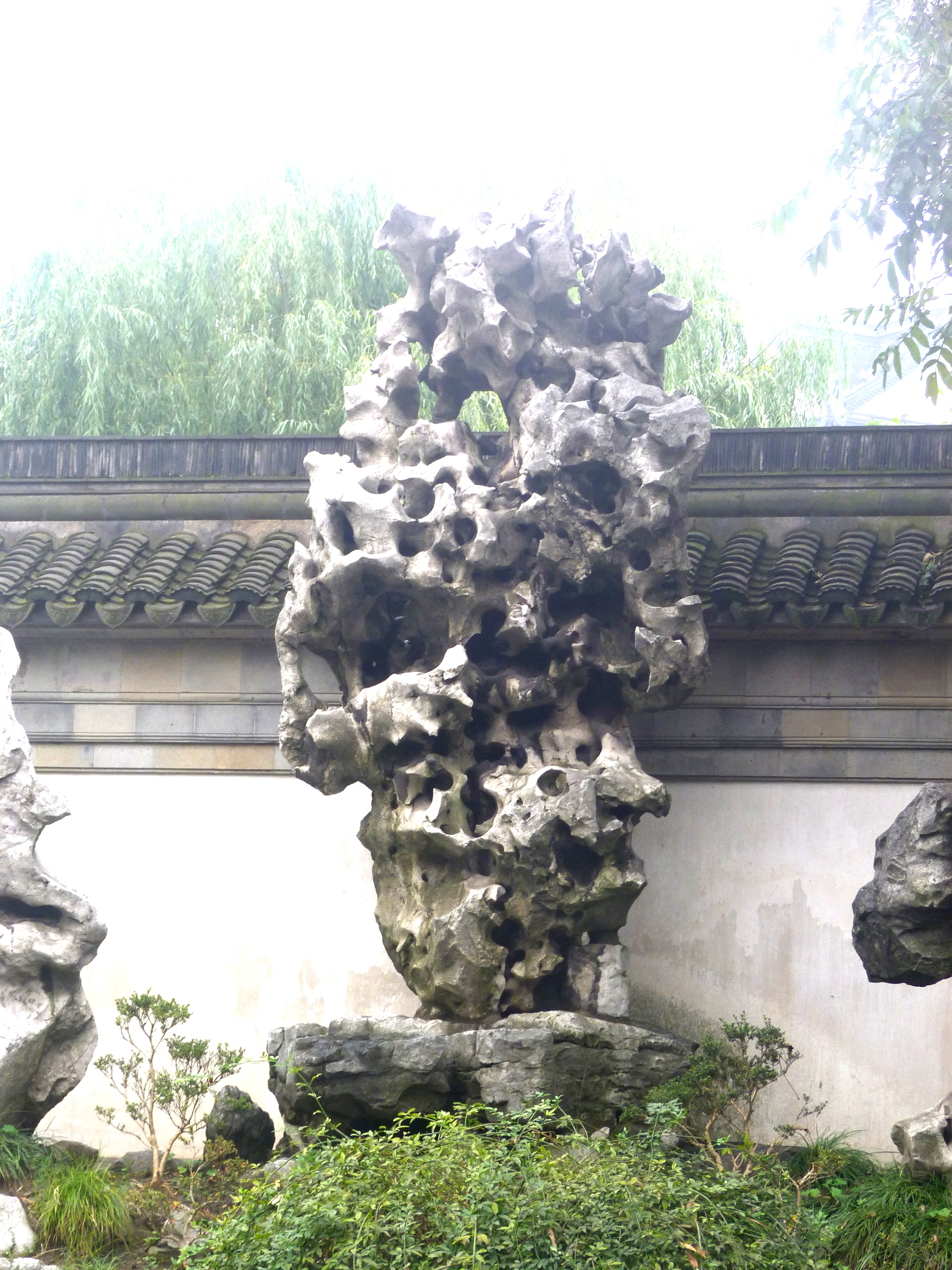
The Exquisite Jade Rock

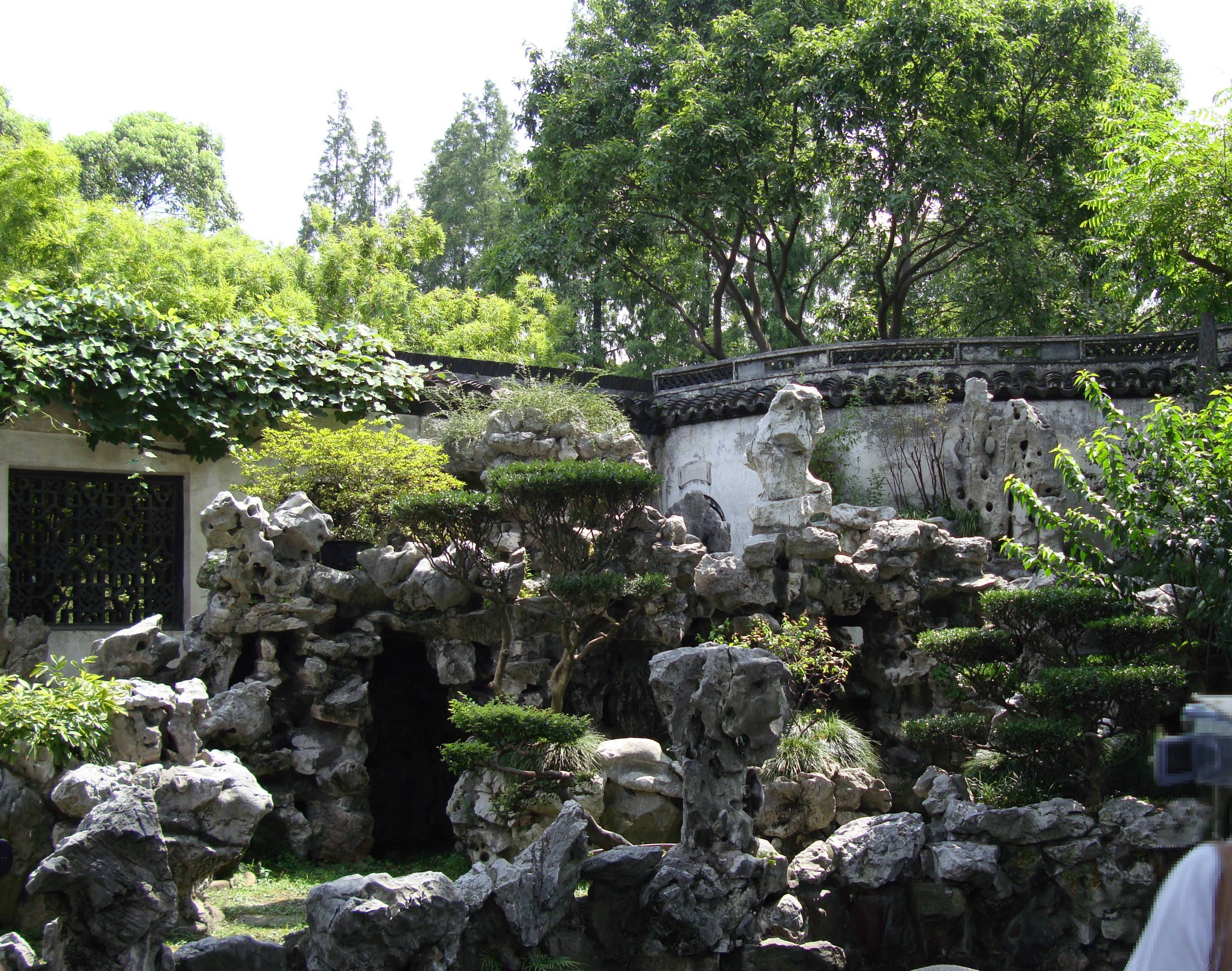
One of the rockeries

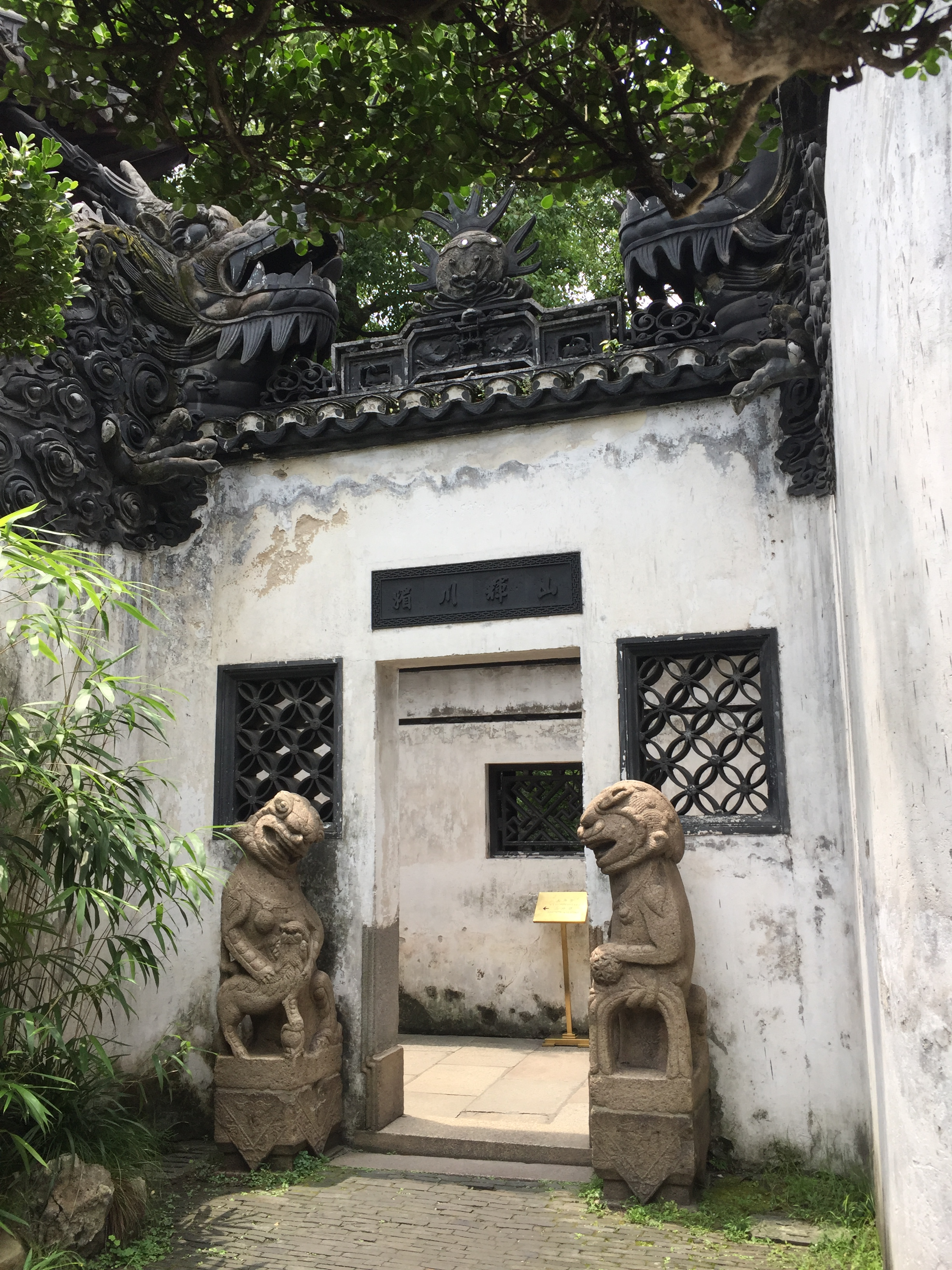
The door of the dragon wall

== See also ==
- Classical Gardens of Suzhou
- List of Chinese gardens
