= Alvin Sariaatmadja =

Owner of US Lecce

Alvin Widarta Sariaatmadja
- Born: 14 August 1983 (age 43); Sydney, Australia
- Citizenship: Indonesian
- Education: University of New South Wales
- Known for: Owner of US Lecce; Director of Emtek
- Parent: Eddy Kusnadi Sariaatmadja (father)

Alvin Widarta Sariaatmadja (born 14 August 1983) is an Indonesian entrepreneur and investor. He is the owner of US Lecce and director of Elang Mahkota Teknologi (Emtek).

== Early life and education ==
Sariaatmadja was born on 14 August 1983 in Sydney, Australia to a couple of Eddy Kusnadi Sariaatmadja and Sofi Wijaya. His father Eddy, is an Sundanese-Palembang billionaire and philanthropist who owns Elang Mahkota Teknologi (Emtek) and a shareholder of Bukalapak and Dana. He completed his undergraduate education in Law and Finance at the University of New South Wales, Australia in 2005.

== Business career ==
After completing his studies, Sariaatmadja began his career as a financial analyst at Melbourne-based investment bank Lazard Carnegie Wylie. In this role, he honed his financial modeling and strategic advisory skills across a range of sectors, including retail, transportation, financial services and healthcare.

Sariaatmadja joined the Elang Mahkota Teknologi (Emtek) Group in 2009 and held several director positions until becoming President Director in April 2015. At the helm of Emtek, he focused on the digitalization of the company's diverse businesses. One of the important milestones under his leadership was the acquisition of digital payment startup PT Espay Debit Indonesia Koe (EDIK) in 2017, which operates the Dana e-wallet. Dana was one of the first startups to introduce a cashless payment system, which is now widely used in Indonesia.

In May 2022, he officially became an investor of the Italian second division football club US Lecce after purchasing a 10% stake of the club. As of May 2024, he is the owner of US Lecce which competes in Serie A, the top tier of Italian football.
