= Eddy Kusnadi Sariaatmadja =

Indonesian billionaire

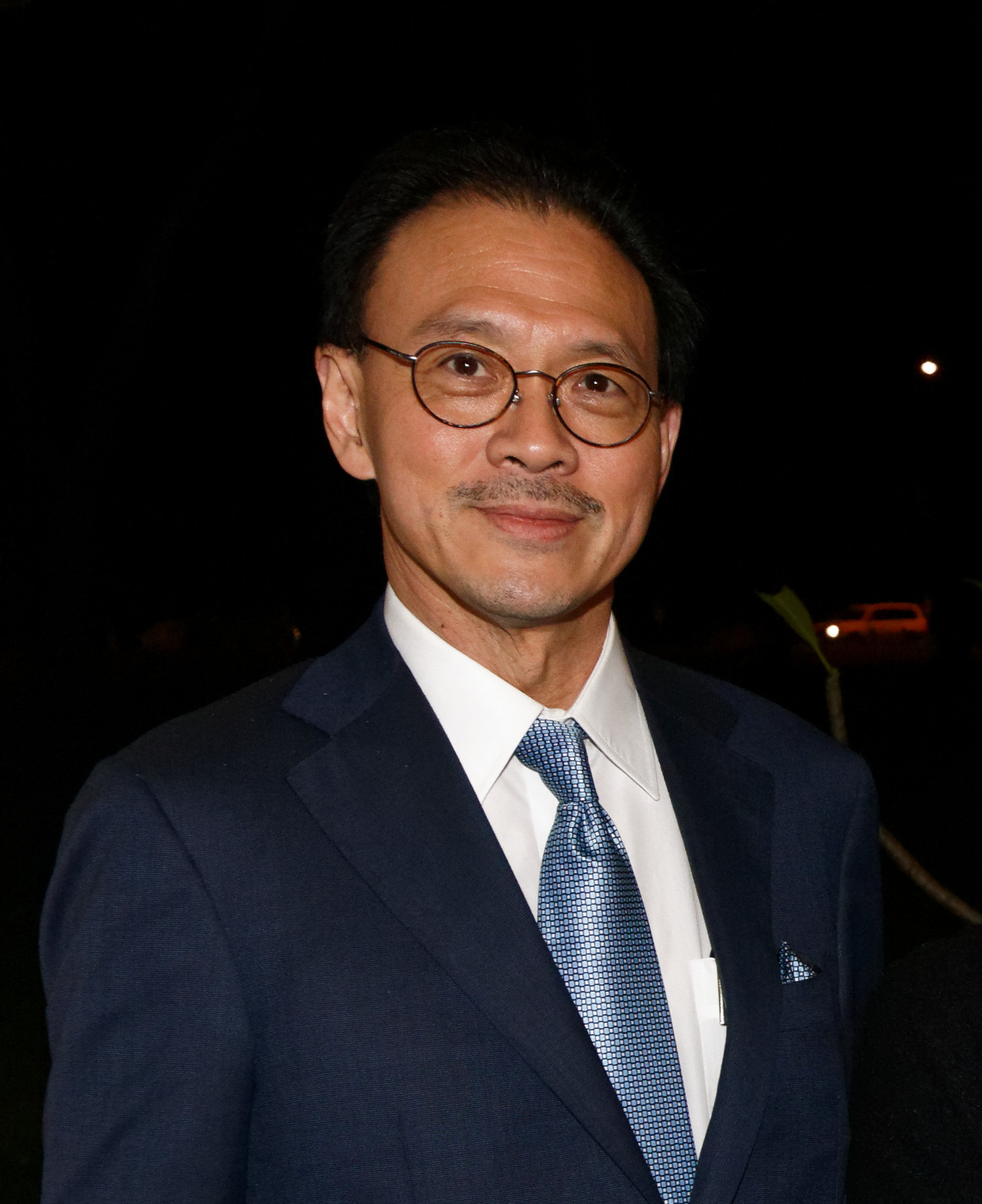
- Sariaatmadja in 2017

Member of National Economic and Industrial Committee
- In office 19 January 2016 – 26 November 2020
- President: Joko Widodo

Personal details
- Born: 23 August 1953 (age 73) Jakarta, Indonesia
- Spouse: Sofi Wijaya
- Children: 2, including Alvin Sariaatmadja
- Education: University of New South Wales (MSE)
- Occupation: Founder & CEO of Emtek

Eddy Kusnadi Sariaatmadja (born 23 August 1953) is an Indonesian entrepreneur and philanthropist. He is the owner of Elang Mahkota Teknologi (Emtek) and a shareholder of several startups such as Bukalapak and Dana. As of June 2021, Sariaatmadja's personal net worth is $3.6 billion.

== Early life and education ==
Sariaatmadja was born on 23 August 1953 in Jakarta. Heis the first son of Mohamad Soeboeb Sariaatmadja, a Sundanese businessman, while his mother is of Palembang-Malay descent. He completed his undergraduate education in Civil Engineering, University of New South Wales, Australia in 1978. In 1980, Sariaatmadja earned a master's degree in Engineering Science at the same university.

== Business career ==
Sariaatmadja business journey began in 1983, when he founded PT Elang Mahkota Komputer. Initially, this company was a distributor of Compaq in Indonesia. In 1997, PT Elang Mahkota Komputer changed its name to PT Elang Mahkota Teknologi (Emtek).

On 2 August 2004, Emtek together with MRA Media established the first local private television station in Jakarta, O Channel (now Moji) which focuses its broadcasts in the Jakarta metropolitan area. In 2005, Emtek acquired Surya Citra Media through PT Abhimata Mediatama. In 2007, Emtek bought MRA Media's shares, so that O Channel was fully owned by Emtek.

On April 17, 2008, Emtek decided to directly control Surya Citra Media. Onn 12 January 2010, Emtek officially listed its initial shares on the Indonesia Stock Exchange. On 13 May 2011, Emtek officially purchased 27.24% of Indosiar Karya Media (Indosiar's parent company) shares from PT Prima Visualindo. At the end of the mandatory tender offer, Emtek officially controlled 84.77% of Indosiar.

On 23 November 2011, Emtek successfully launched a subscription television with the Nexmedia, that can be installed with a regular television antenna. However, Nexmedia stopped operating on 1 September 2019, then replaced by Vidio and Nex Parabola.

In recent years, Emtek has also been aggressive in acquiring shares in a number of start-up companies. After establishing the DANA digital wallet platform, Emtek also controlled 50% of the shares of PT Nusa Satu Inti Artha which manages the DOKU digital wallet platform. Then Emtek also bought 34.88% of the shares of the e-commerce company Bukalapak.

To increase its investment portion in the health industry, in 2020 Emtek acquired 71.88% of the shares of PT Sarana Metropolitan Tbk (SAME), which is the controller of the Omni International Hospital network. This acquisition completes its ownership in the EMC Hospital network.

According to Forbes magazine, in 2021 Sariaatmadja's wealth was estimated to reach US$3.6 billion. This amount has placed him in the ranks of the 10 richest people in Indonesia. In 2018, Forbes also ranked Sariaatmadja as one of the 40 most generous people in Asia.
