= Jakarta MRT =

Rapid transit system in Jakarta, Indonesia

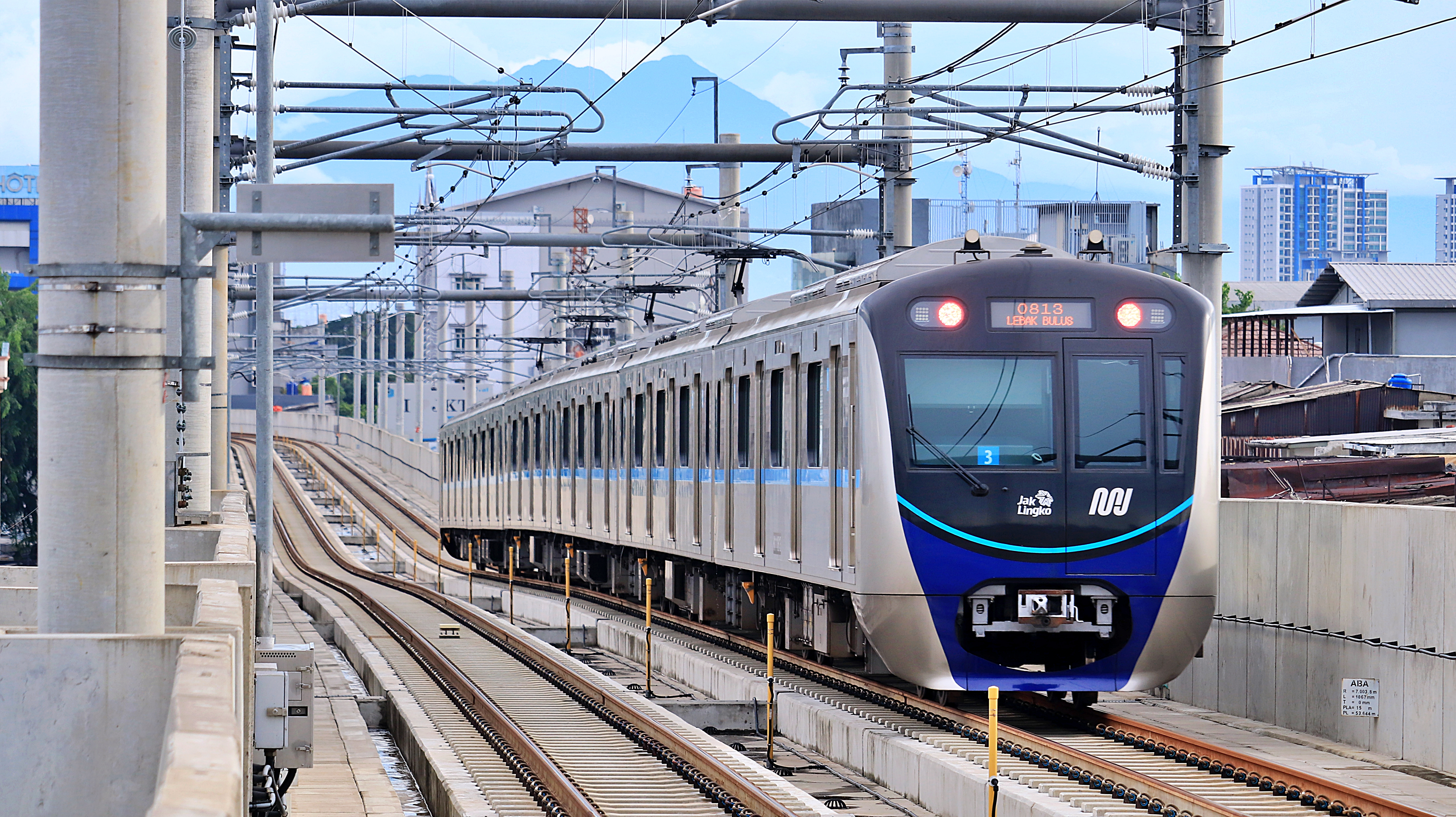
- Ratangga set 3 arriving at Haji Nawi station

Overview
- Native name: Moda Raya Terpadu (MRT) Jakarta (Note: lit. "Jakarta Integrated Mass Mode")
- Owner: Provincial Government of DKI Jakarta directly and through Perumda Pasar Jaya
- Area served: Greater Jakarta (Note: "Serves on Phase 3")
- Locale: Jakarta, Indonesia
- Transit type: Rapid transit
- Number of lines: 1
- Number of stations: 13 (operational); 7 (under construction)
- Daily ridership: 204,570 (daily peak); 127,259 (2025 average)
- Annual ridership: 46.449 million (2025)
- Chief executive: Tuhiyat, CEO
- Headquarters: Wisma Nusantara, 21st Floor, Jalan Mohammad Husni Thamrin 59, Jakarta, 10350, Indonesia
- Website: MRT Jakarta

Operation
- Began operation: 24 March 2019; 7 years ago
- Operator: PT Mass Rapid Transit Jakarta (Perseroda)
- Character: Elevated & underground
- Number of vehicles: 16 six-car MRTJ 1000 series trainsets
- Headway: 5 minutes (peak); 10 minutes (off-peak)

Technical
- System length: 15.7 km (9.8 mi) (operational); 30.3 km (18.8 mi) (under construction)
- Track gauge: 1,067 mm (3 ft 6 in)
- Electrification: 1,500 V DC overhead catenary
- Top speed: 80 km/h (elevated section); 100 km/h (underground section)

The Jakarta Mass Rapid Transit (Indonesian: Moda Raya Terpadu Jakarta) or Jakarta MRT (MRT Jakarta, stylized in all-lowercase) is a rapid transit system in Jakarta, the capital city of Indonesia.

The system is operated by PT Mass Rapid Transit Jakarta (Perseroda), a perseroan terbatas company owned by the Jakarta provincial government. Phase 1 of the project (Lebak Bulus to Bundaran HI) was officially opened on 24 March 2019.

== History ==
Jakarta is the capital and largest city of Indonesia, harbouring 10 million inhabitants, one-third of the population of Greater Jakarta. It is estimated that over four million residents of the surrounding Greater Jakarta area commute to and from the city each working day. Transport issues are attracting increasing political attention with a government goal of increasing the number of trips using public transport to 60% by 2030.

=== Impending gridlock and stall ===
The idea of MRT construction in Jakarta has been sparked since 1985 by the then Head of the Agency for the Assessment and Application of Technology (currently the National Research and Innovation Agency), B.J. Habibie (a man who would later become president). While the BPPT said that population growth in Jakarta declined between 1985 and 1990, the growth of Jakarta's satellite cities, known collectively as Bodetabek, increased the amount of residents travelling in and out of Jakarta. The roads in Jakarta were no longer able to accommodate the population. Therefore, a mode of transport was needed that accommodated the mobility of people from the Bodetabek area.

As of 2010, public transportation in Jakarta served only 56% of commuter trips. The average growth of motorised vehicles in Jakarta was 9.5%, while the growth of road length was only 0.1% between 2005 and 2010. This had to be addressed with a policy to reduce and prevent severe congestion. Until then, public transportation in the city mainly consisted of the TransJakarta bus rapid transit system, the KRL Commuterline commuter rail, and varying types of independent buses; starting from the very small bemo and pickup-truck sized mikrolet, to slightly larger minibuses such as the widely used MetroMini and Kopaja minibuses and full sized city buses.

According to Dr. Soetjipto Wirosardjono, the deputy chairman of the Central Bureau of Statistics, the MRT system has never been a priority for the governors since they are mostly interested in the implementation of the project, and that means the system would take 15 to 20 years to complete. Many studies have been done either by the Germans, the French, the Japanese, or the World Bank, and no decision has been taken regarding the implementation of a public transportation system. An international consortium was formed in August 1995 to prepare a feasibility study of the first line of the MRT system. The consortium is named Indonesian Japanese European Group (IJEG), composed of Itochu Corporation of Japan, German companies Ferrostaal AG, AEG, and Siemens, ABB, Taylor Woodrow, and Indonesian companies such as Bakrie Brothers, Lippo, Bukaka Suthanthabie, Steady Safe, etc.

In 1996, President Soeharto's administration set out to build the Jakarta MRT with a 14.5-km and 17-station Blok M‒Stasiun Jakarta Kota route, fully built underground. In April 1997, an MOU agreement was signed with Tycoon Bamabang Trihatmodjo (Bimantara Group) for the joining of the consortium planning a US$2 billion system. The planned completion was set for 2001, but disputes over financing have delayed the venture. However, this endeavour failed due to the 1997‒1998 economic crisis. In 2000, the project was resumed after Indonesia's socio-political and economic conditions improved. At that time, the Study on Integrated Transportation Master Plan for Jabodetabek (SITRAMP) phase I was initiated. The main points of SITRAMP I were the reassessment of the MRT project of Fatmawati‒Monas route and the installation of the concept for SITRAMP II.

At the request of the Government of Indonesia, Japan International Cooperation Agency (JICA) was entrusted by the Government of Japan to undertake the SITRAMP II study which lasted from November 2001 to March 2004. JICA offered the Fatmawati‒Monas route with several alternative construction designs to the government which were obtained after conducting a feasibility study. However, efforts to build the MRT were only resumed in 2005. President Susilo Bambang Yudhoyono designated the Jakarta MRT as a national project. From this designation, the preparatory processes for the construction of the first line of the Jakarta MRT began. The Japanese government also agreed to provide a loan for this national project.

=== First development ===
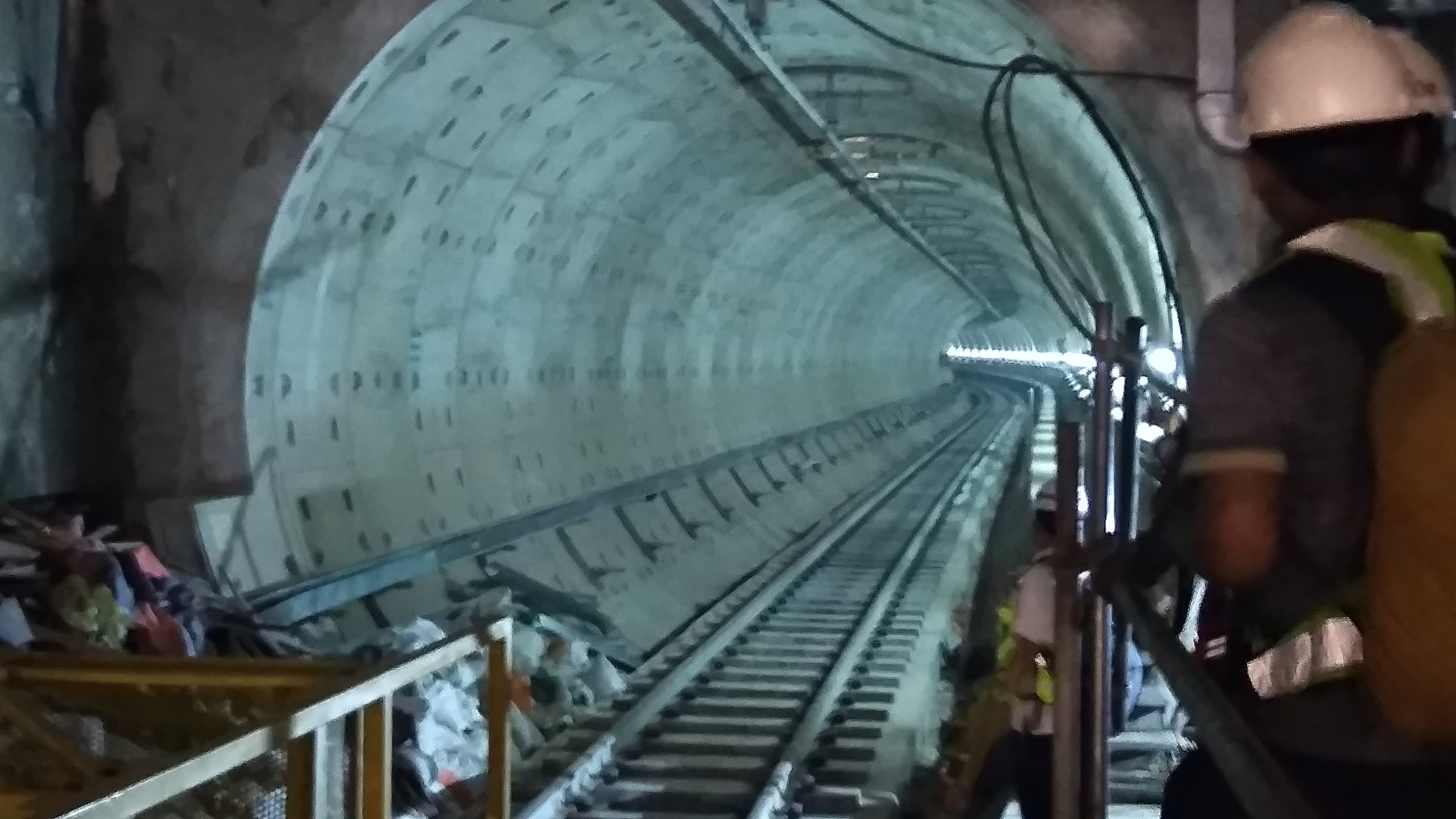
Dukuh Atas MRT Station underground line tunnel during construction (2019)

The process of developing the first line of the Jakarta MRT began when President SBY designated the system as a national project. In November 2006, the first loan agreement was signed with JICA (then Japan Bank for International Cooperation or JBIC) for the MRT project. The agreement includes study funding and construction work funding for the first MRT line. On 17 June 2008, the DKI Jakarta Government established PT MRT Jakarta as a regional-owned enterprise company to support the construction and operation of the Jakarta MRT.

The basic design work of this first line was carried out from 2010 to 2012. On 26 April 2012, the declaration of the preparation of the Jakarta MRT North-South Line project was carried out by then DKI Jakarta Governor, Fauzi Bowo. A year later, on 11 June 2013, the first three project contracts were signed, namely the underground track construction. Meanwhile, the contract for the elevated track was signed on 10 October 2013. This event was held in conjunction with the laying of the first stone to mark the start of construction by the new Governor, Joko Widodo.

Construction of the entire line was completed on 31 October 2017. Starting 12 March 2019, the line was opened to the public in a limited public trial that lasted until just before the inauguration. The first line of the Jakarta MRT was officially operated on 24 March 2019 after being inaugurated by President Joko Widodo.

=== Continued development ===
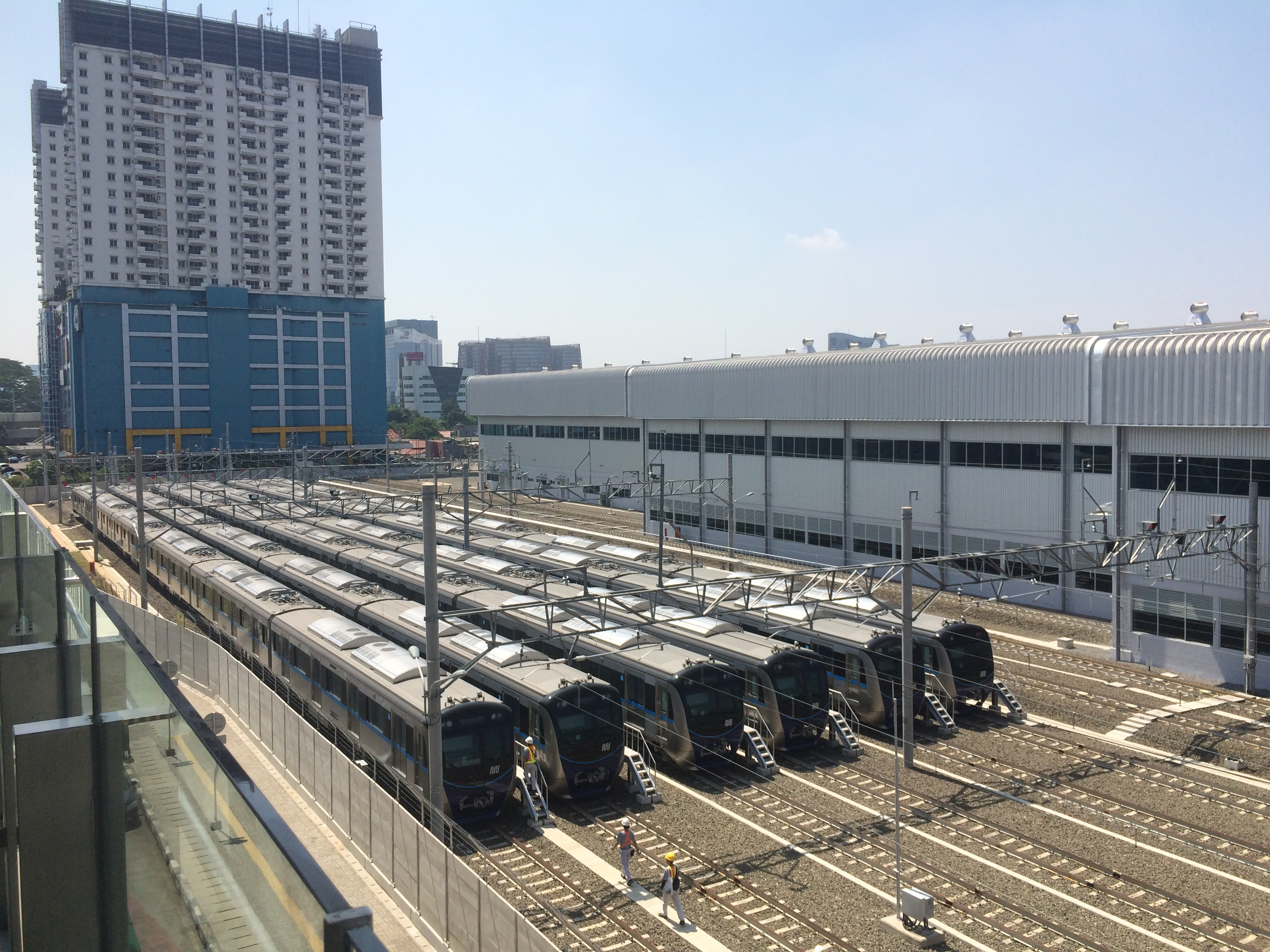
MRT train depot in Lebak Bulus Station

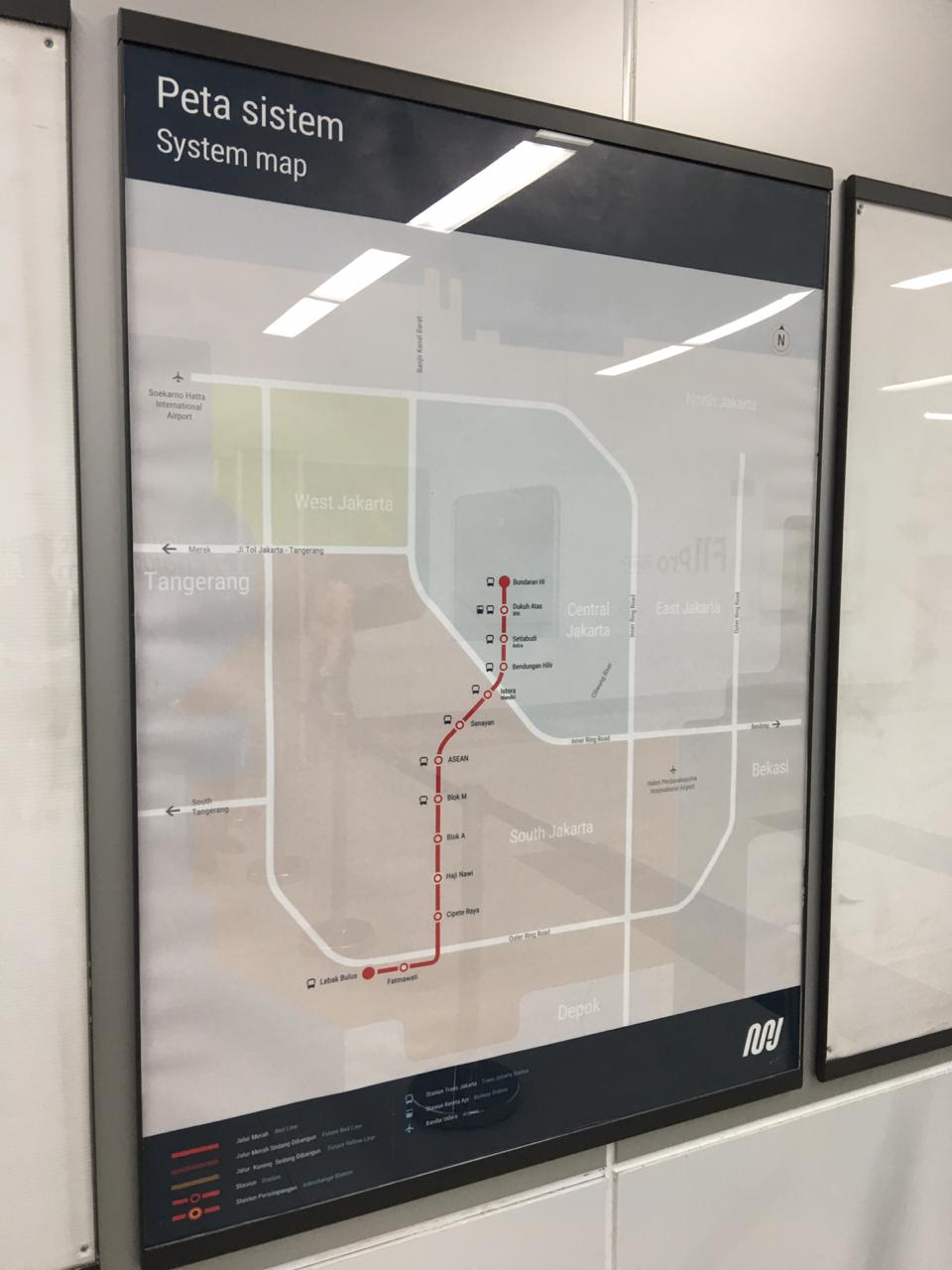
Jakarta MRT Red line system map

At the same time as the inauguration of the first phase of the North-South Line, President Joko Widodo also launched the construction of the second phase of the North-South Line. The construction process of this second phase, especially phase II-A (Bunderan HI‒Kota Tua), is considered to be behind schedule. This is due to the COVID-19 pandemic which affects the budget and the contract auction process. As a result, several contract packages are combined and carried out by direct procurement. The first segment construction target, which was originally to be completed in 2024, is believed to be delayed until 2025. The construction process for this phase is still ongoing. Unlike the previous phase, this second phase has been designed to be built with the concept of a transit-oriented area, making it easier for users to switch modes of transport. Meanwhile, phase II-B (Kota Tua‒Ancol) is still under feasibility study.

According to the JABODETABEK Urban Transportation Policy Integration Phase (JUTPI) report, the Jabodetabek transportation master plan (RITJ) will eventually form 10 MRT routes, which by 2035 will consist of:

- MRT 01 Lebak Bulus-Kampung Bandan (2024) – the North–South Line.
- MRT 02 Balaraja-Cikarang (From 2029 the initial phase of Ujung Menteng Kalideres) – the East–West Line which has undergone changes so that it passes through the Ujung Menteng-Tomang segment.
- MRT 03 Kota-SHIA (2029) – passes Pluit and PIK.
- MRT 04 Lebak Bulus-Cawang-Cilincing.
- MRT 05 Karawaci-Cikarang Selatan (From 2029, Halim-Joglo).
- MRT 06 Lebak Bulus-Rawa Buntu-Karawaci.
- MRT 07 North Bekasi-South Bekasi.
- MRT 08 Pluit-Grogol-Kuningan-Depok (From 2029, Pluit-Cilandak).
- MRT 09 MRT Outer Ring Line (2034) – from Kamal to Cilincing following the Fatmawati-TMII route
- MRT 10 MRT Inner Ring Line.

Meanwhile, according to the DKI Jakarta Provincial Government on 12 November 2021 live at the Jakarta Investment Forum (JIF), the Railway Masterplan 2039 (Concept of DKI Jakarta Transportation Masterplan) will be divided into two based on ownership status.

The first is the DKI Jakarta Provincial Government Urban Railway with 14 lines consisting of two MRT lines, six LRT lines and six "Jakarta Urban Railway" lines or PPJ for short. This PPJ is the benchmark for the route that will later be used for rail transportation in the future, which can use any means of rail transportation such as trams, LRTs or MRTs. Meanwhile, the second is the Central Government Railway with the Jabodebek LRT, KRL Commuterline (with the development of Jatinegara-Manggarai-Tanah Abang-Duri-Angke-Kampung Bandan-Jatinegara into an Elevated Loopline), and the Jakarta-Bandung high-speed train.

The routes belonging to the DKI Jakarta provincial government are:

1. MRT Lebak Bulus-Ancol Barat – the North–South Line.
2. MRT Ujung Menteng-Meruya Utara – the East–West Line, which has undergone changes so that it passes through the Ujung Menteng-Tomang segment and is also extended with the Ujung Menteng-Cikarang and Tomang-Balaraja segments
3. LRT Pegangsaan Dua-Velodrome
4. LRT Kelapa Gading-JIS
5. LRT Velodrome-Klender
6. LRT JIS-Rajawali
7. LRT Klender-Halim
8. LRT Pulogebang-Joglo
9. PPJ Rajawali-Pesing
10. PPJ Pesing-Karet
11. PPJ Pulogebang-JIS – Possibly becoming part of the MRT Outer Ring Line
12. PPJ Lebak Bulus-PIK – Possibly becoming part of the MRT Outer Ring Line
13. PPJ JIS-PIK – Possibly becoming part of the MRT Outer Ring Line
14. PPJ Fatmawati-TMII – Confirmed to be the phase 4 of the MRT as part of the MRT Outer Ring Line

Apart from that, South Korea's Hyundai Rotem offers an alternative Outer Ring Line route from Rawa Buaya to Ujung Menteng via Kembangan Station (Integration with the MRT East-West Line), Tanah Kusir Station (integration with the new station on the KRL Rangkasbitung Line), Fatmawati (Integration with the MRT North-South Line), then follow the Fatmawati-TMII route, then continuing back to Cikunir Station (integration with the LRT Jabodebek Bekasi Line), Cakung Station (Integration with the KRL Cikarang Line), and Ujung Menteng Station (Integration with the MRT East-West Line).

== Funding ==
=== Phase 1 ===
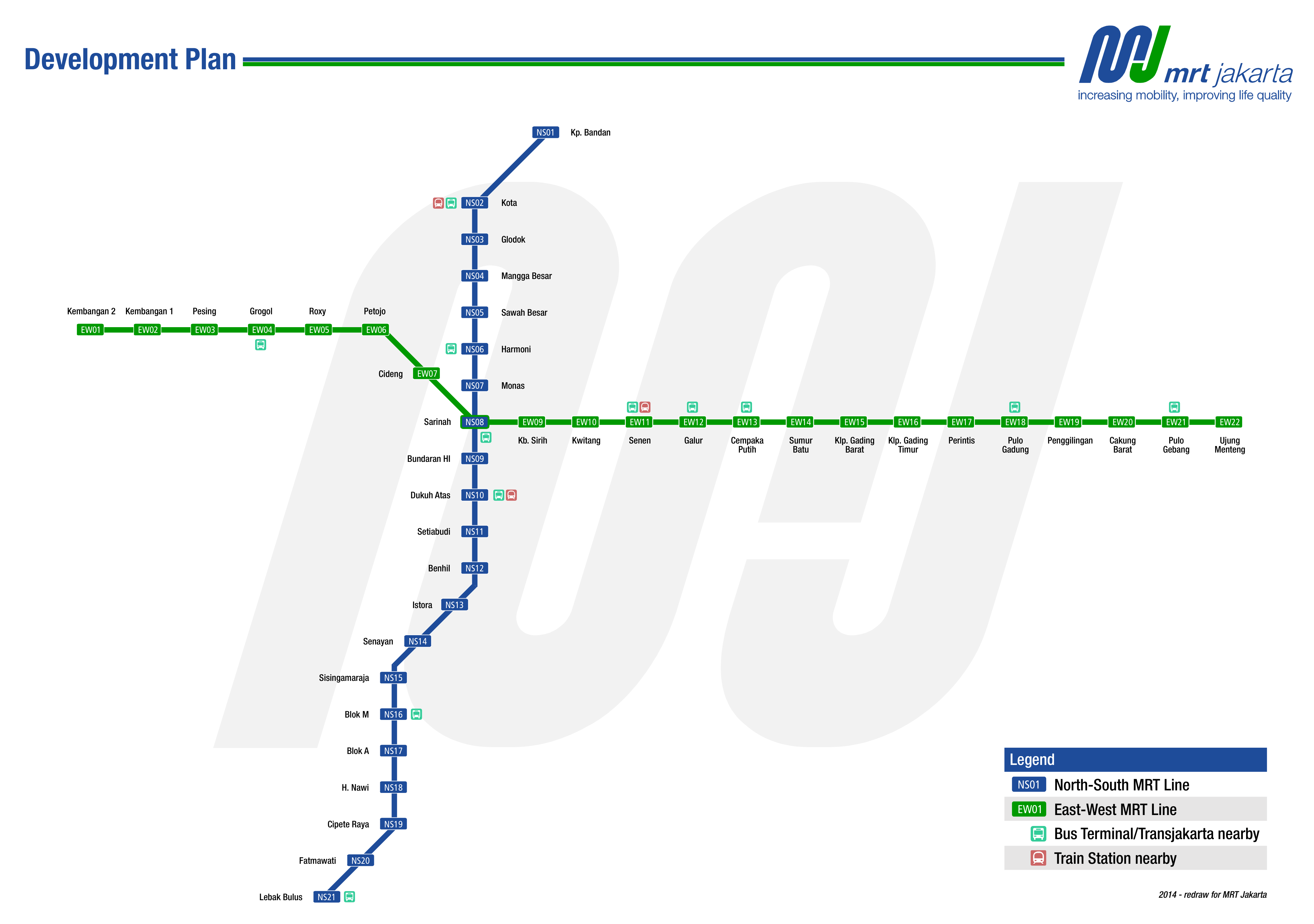
Initial proposed line and stations of MRT Jakarta (2014)

Phase 1 of the project was funded through a soft loan (Rp16 trillion) (US$1.2 billion) from the JICA with a 30 years tenure and 0.25% interest per annum. The loan number IP is 536 (signed November 2006) for engineering services. The engineering services loan is a pre-construction loan to prepare the construction phase. It consists of:

- Basic Design package, managed by the DGR (Directorate General of Railways, Ministry of Transport)
- Management and Operation package, managed by the Bappeda (Jakarta Regional Planning Board)
- Construction assistance in tender, managed by the PT MRT Jakarta

=== Phase 2 ===
Phase 2 was funded through a similar loan scheme with a 40 years tenure, allowing a 10 years grace period. The first stage of phase 2 funding (Rp9.4 trillion) incurred 0.1% interest per annum. Phase 2A funding (Rp25 trillion) will cover a portion of phase 1 excess expenditure (Rp2.5 trillion).

On 24 August 2022, it was announced that the cost required for Phase 2A has been adjusted to Rp26 trillion (US$1.7 billion), up from Rp22.5 trillion. The challenging soil conditions were cited as the reason for the increase.

=== Phase 3 ===
Phase 3 is funded by JICA and the Asian Development Bank (ADB), in January 2023 it was announced that cost required for Phase 3 is Rp160 trillion (US$10.6 billion). While ADB will finance the project with up to $600 million.

The Phase 3 will connect Balaraja and Cikarang.

=== Phase 4 ===
Phase 4 will be funded by a South Korean consortium led by Korea Overseas Infrastructure and Urban Development Corporation with estimate cost of Rp21 trillion (US$1.9 billion).

== System network ==
The Jakarta MRT is expected to stretch across over 122.8 kilometres (76.3 mi), including 26.7 kilometres (16.6 mi) for the Red line (from Lebak Bulus to Ancol), 84.1 kilometres (52.3 mi) for the Yellow line (from Cikarang to Balaraja), and 12.0 kilometres (7.5 mi) for the Green line (from Fatmawati to TMII). Trains run on the right to match Indonesian railways, which also have a right handed traffic, despite Indonesia having left handed traffic for roads.

The following table lists the MRT lines that are currently operational, under construction or planned as of April 2023. Planned lines are preliminary and could still be altered before entering construction phase.

Colour and Line Name	Phase	Service Commencement	Terminus	Stations	Length	Depot
Operational
North-South Line	NS—1A	24 March 2019	Lebak Bulus; Bundaran HI	13	15.7 km (9.8 mi)	Lebak Bulus
Under construction
North-South Line	NS—2A	2027; 2029	Bundaran HI; Kota	7	5.8 km (3.6 mi)	Lebak Bulus
East-West Line	EW—1A	2032	Tomang; Medan Satria	21	24.5 km (15.2 mi)	Rorotan
Under Preparation
North-South Line	NS—2B	TBA	Kota; Ancol	2	5.2 km (3.2 mi)	Ancol Barat
East-West Line	EW—1B	TBA	Tomang; Kembangan	6	9.2 km (5.7 mi)	Rorotan
East-West Line	EW—2W	TBA	Kembangan; Balaraja	14	29.9 km (18.6 mi)	Balaraja (preliminary)
East-West Line	EW—2E	TBA	Medan Satria; Cikarang	8	20.5 km (12.7 mi)	Balaraja (preliminary)
Outer–Ring Line	4	TBA	Kampung Rambutan (TMII); Fatmawati	10	12 km (7.5 mi)	Kampung Rambutan (preliminary)
North-South Line	TBA	TBA	Lebak Bulus; Serpong	10	21.7 km (13.5 mi)	Serpong (preliminary)

=== North–South line ===
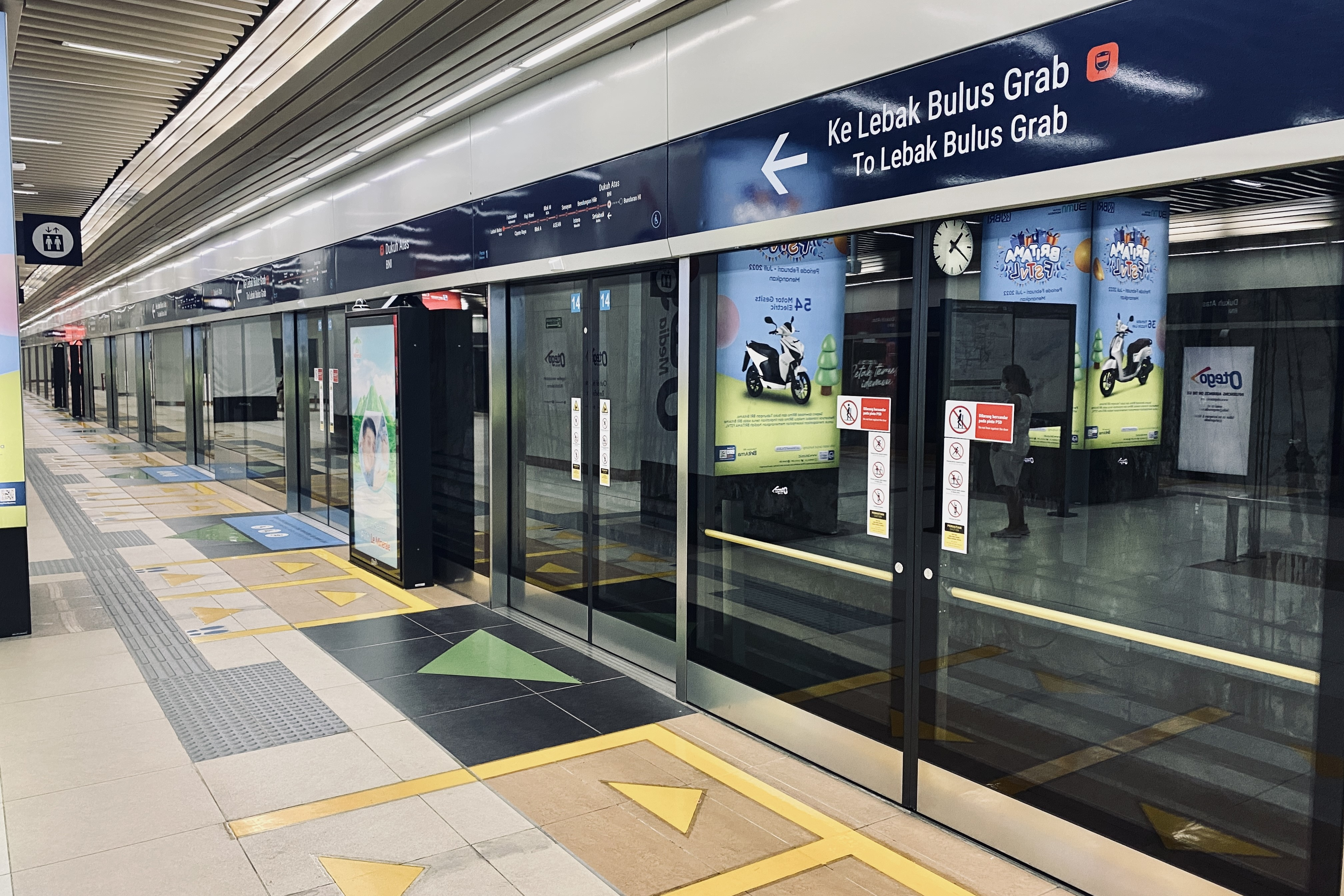
Dukuh Atas Station Platform

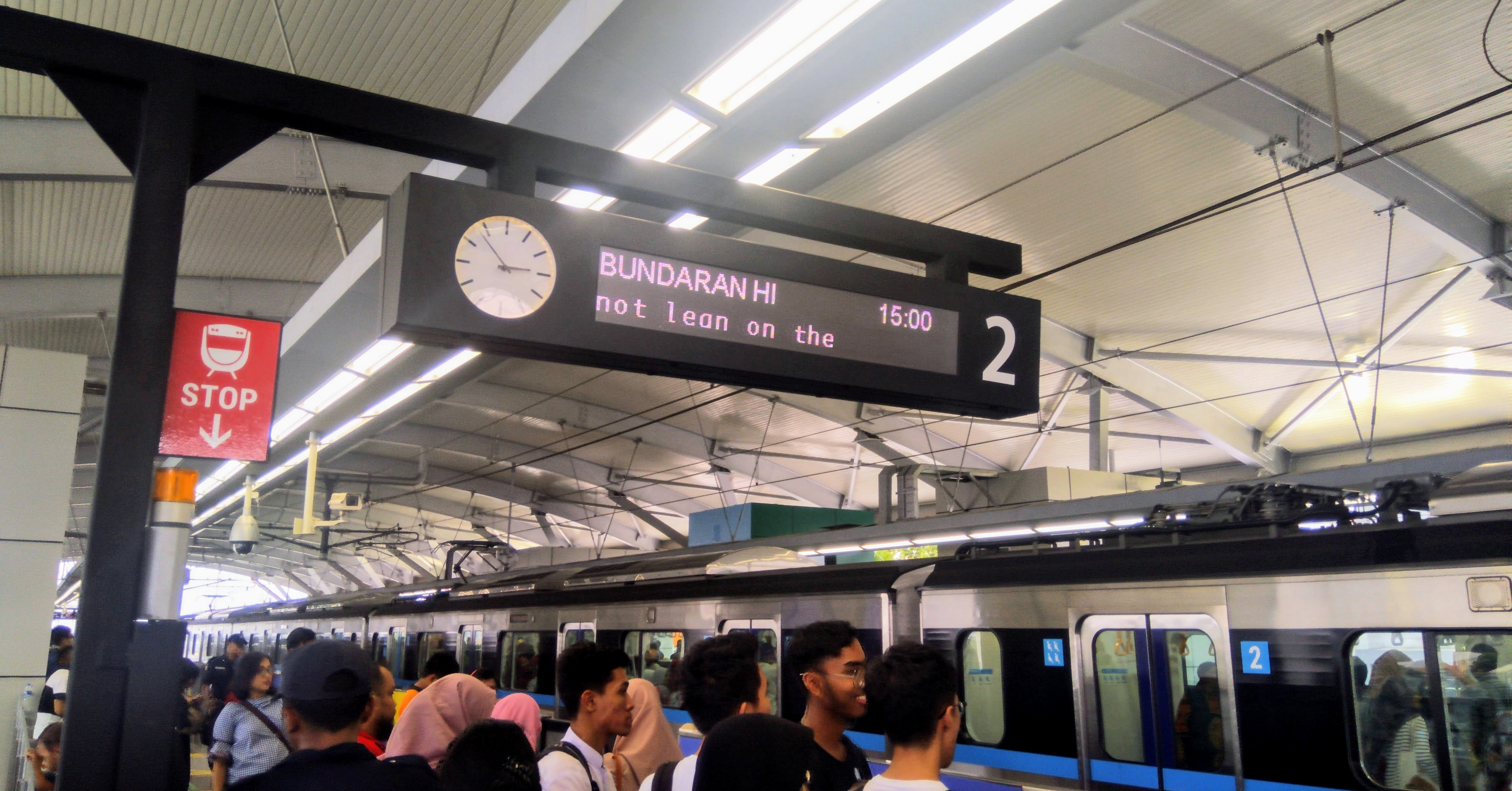
Jakarta MRT passengers waiting for the train on the platform

==== Phase 1 ====
Phase 1 connects Lebak Bulus to Bundaran HI along 15.7 kilometres (9.8 mi) and consists of 13 stations (7 elevated stations and 6 underground stations). The Indonesian Ministry of Transport approved this plan in September 2010 and invited tenders. Construction began in October 2013.

Jakarta MRT arriving at the Dukuh Atas BNI station.

Phase 1 was opened for free service on 24 March 2019. Commercial service began on 1 April 2019. Phase 1 is expected to serve 212,000 passengers per day. This expected capacity may be maxed out to 960,000 per day. The 15.7 kilometres (9.8 mi) distance is covered in under 30 minutes. Within its first month of operations, 82,000 passengers used the line daily.

==== Phase 2 ====
Phase 2 was initially planned to extend Bundaran HI to Kampung Bandan in North Jakarta. However, land acquisition issues hindered the process, prompting the administration to find an alternative location, which will also be designed to house the train depot.

On 1 January 2019, the president director of MRT Jakarta, William Sabandar said the city administration had decided to make Kota the final station for Phase 2. The extension was then renamed to Phase 2A.

Phase 2A will extend the Red line northwards, from Bundaran HI to Kota and consists of 7 stations over 5.8 kilometres (3.6 mi). The extension was initially planned to be fully operational by March 2026. However, due to problems securing bidders for the construction and the effects of the COVID-19 pandemic, the extension is now targeted to be fully operational by 2028.

On 20 February 2019, it was announced that the Red line will be extended further, towards Ancol. The extension was named Phase 2B.

On 17 February 2020, during the signing of contract CP201 for the construction of the first two stations of the Phase 2A extension, the administration announced that Phase 2B will consist of two stations and one depot, and was under feasibility studies, with its construction expected to commence in mid-2022. It has since been delayed. Phase 2B is estimated to cost Rp10 trillion.

Phase 2A construction started on 22 March 2021. During excavation works for the construction of Phase 2A, the remains of tracks used for Jakarta's tramway were found.

=== East–West line ===
The East–West Line is the second MRT Jakarta line which connects Cikarang in the east with Balaraja in the west via the Central Jakarta area. This line is planned to have 48 stations and a length of approximately 84.102 to 87 km (52.259 to 54.059 mi) with funding requirements of IDR 160 trillion. Just like the north–south line, the east–west line will also be built in phases, with similar system and gauge between the two lines. The line is planned to interchange with the north–south line at Thamrin Station. Architectural design studies have been underway and construction was initially expected to begin in 2020, however it has since been delayed. Groundbreaking ceremony was held on 11 September 2024, with construction to be commenced in 2025.

==== Phase 3A ====
Phase 3A is the initial phase of construction of the East–West Line, divided into two stages. Initially, it was planned to stretch for 31.7 km (19.7 mi) connecting Ujung Menteng with Kembangan. Later, it was revised to connect Medan Satria (in Bekasi) with Tomang (in West Jakarta) first for Phase 3A Stage 1, stretching 24.5 km (15.2 mi), and then Kembangan with Tomang for Phase 3A Stage 2, stretching 9.2 km (5.7 mi). Stage 1 will be funded by Japan International Cooperation Agency (JICA), after an agreement was signed on 13 May 2024. Construction began in late 2024, marked by a ground-breaking ceremony on 11 September 2024.

==== Phase 3B ====
Phase 3B itself will initially have 22 stations, with 14 stations in the Balaraja-Karangtengah segment (Phase 3B Stage 1) and 8 stations in Medan Satria-Cikarang segment (Phase 3B Stage 2). Later, the construction of the western segment of the line was revised to Balaraja-Kembangan, while the eastern segment remains the same, with total length of 50.4 km (31.3 mi) of line to be constructed.

=== Outer–Ring Line (planned) ===
In December 2020, the President Director of MRT Jakarta, William Sabandar, announced plans for the construction of Phase 4. This line will connect Fatmawati with Taman Mini Indonesia Indah for approximately 12 km (7.5 mi). This route is considered the most strategic route because there is no rail transportation that passes through this area. Apart from that, this route is planned to be integrated with the Kampung Rambutan Bus Terminal, Tanjung Barat Station (KRL Bogor Line), and the Jabodebek LRT (Cibubur Line). Currently the process has begun for a feasibility study and then a design planning process is carried out. This phase of construction is planned to use the Government Cooperation with Business Entities (KPBU) scheme. It is planned that this line will be built starting in 2025.

As of 2026, Phase 4 is still undergoing feasibility studies.

== Fares and ticketing ==
=== Tariff ===
The Jakarta MRT employs a cashless fare payment system. On 26 March 2019, the Jakarta MRT fares were set. The initial fare is Rp.3,000 as the minimum fare and increases by Rp.1,000 with each passing station. A trip spanning the entire existing line in 2019, travelling from Lebak Bulus Station to Bundaran HI Station, would cost a passenger Rp14,000. This fare was expected to come into effect on 1 April 2019.

=== Payment method ===
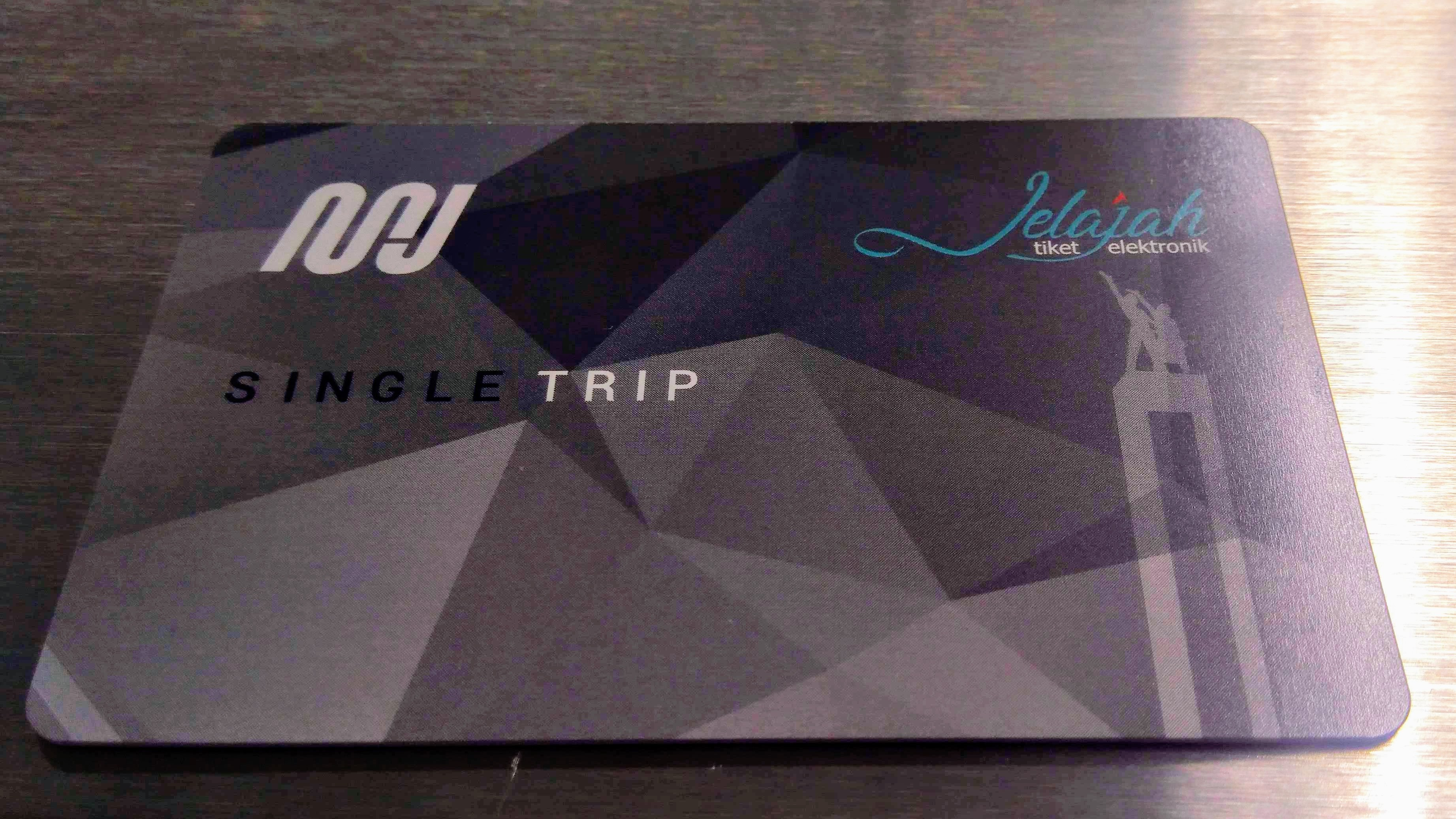
Kartu Jelajah (single trip) by MRT Jakarta

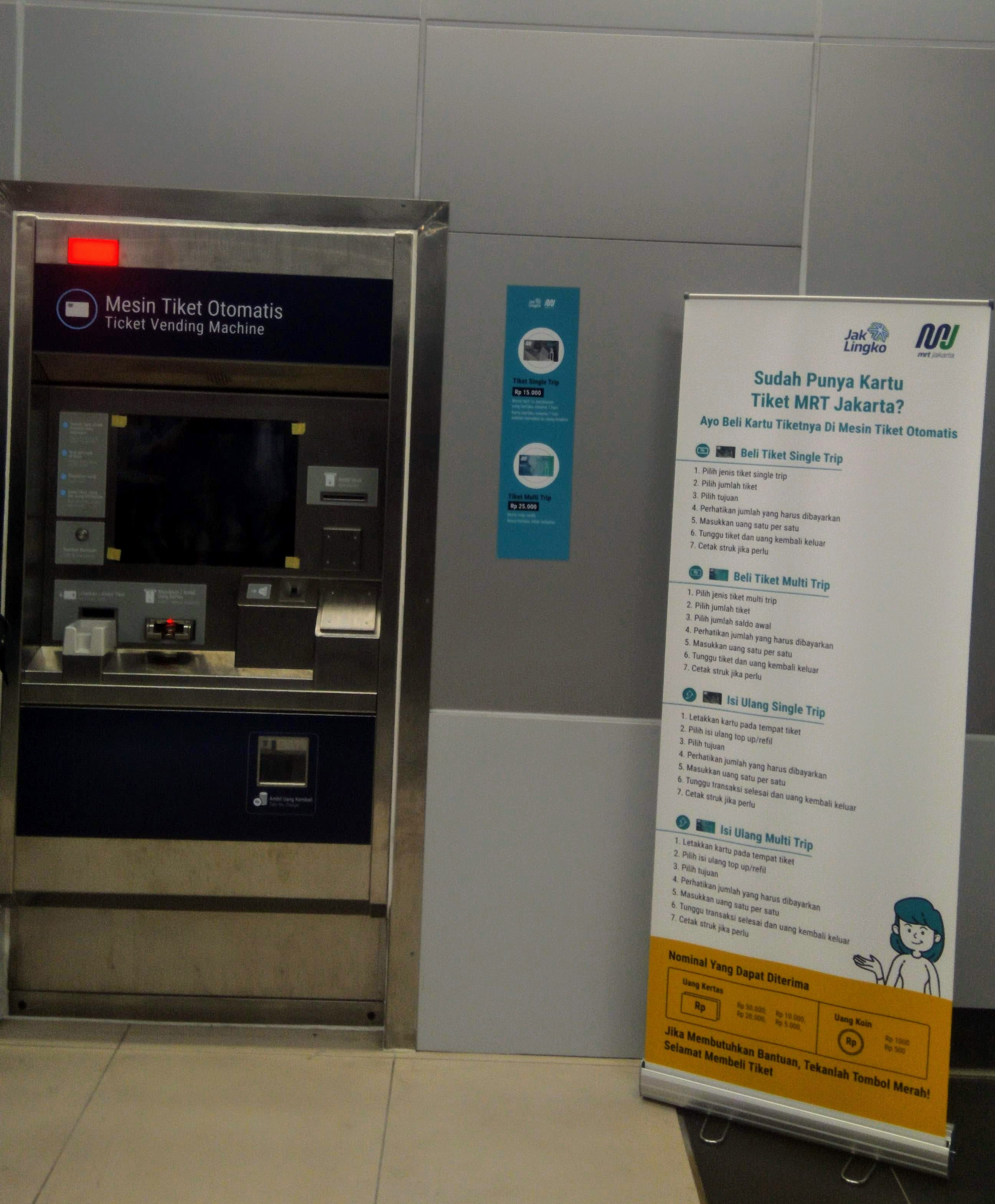
Automatic ticketing machine

==== Kartu Jelajah (single and multi trip) ====
In order to fulfil the need for electronic tickets for MRT operations, a dedicated contactless smart card known as the 'Jelajah' can be purchased from the ticketing machines or ticket offices located at every station. This payment card is released in two types of cards, namely cards for single-trip and prepaid cards for multi-trip. Single-trip cards can only be used for one trip and are required to be topped up within a maximum of 7 days after purchase. Meanwhile, multi-trip cards could be used multiple times as long as the balance in the card was still sufficient. The implementation of the multi-trip Cruise Card as a payment method was approved by Bank Indonesia on 14 November 2019. The card used the fast FeliCa technology to enable smoother passenger flow through the stations.

A refundable Rp15,000 deposit is required to purchase a single journey ticket, in addition to fares required for the journey.

The multi-trip card was no longer sold since January 2024 and its usage was discontinued on 31 October 2024.

==== Jak Lingko ====
To optimise intermodal transport, the DKI Jakarta Provincial Government implemented an integrated payment method using the Jak Lingko card and application. This programme is a continuation of the existing OK-Otrip system. This card can also be used for Jakarta LRT, Transjakarta, and KRL Commuter Line. MRT Jakarta accepts all Jak Lingko payments provided by Bank Jakarta and Himbara member banks such as BRI, BNI and Mandiri. There is currently a trial of the new Jak Lingko card and application based on the KRL Commuterline Multi Trip Card and Fello e-wallet. Through the application, users can pay from all e-wallets that are connected to the Indonesian QR Code Standard (QRIS).

==== Electronic banking cards ====
Jakarta MRT payments can also be made using electronic cards from various banks. The electronic cards include those issued by Himbara, namely Bank BNI, Bank BRI, and Bank Mandiri. In addition, cards provided by Bank Jakarta and Bank BCA are also accepted by MRT Jakarta. The list of electronic banking cards that can be used in fare payment is as follows:

- BRIZZI (Bank BRI)
- TapCash (Bank BNI)
- e-Money (Bank Mandiri)
- Flazz (Bank BCA)
- Jakcard (Bank Jakarta)

==== Credit card ====
On 29 July 2026, Jakarta MRT began to accept payment with contactless EMV credit card, the first of its kind in Indonesia. Passengers (especially tourists) are able to use either Visa or Mastercard credit cards aside from using pre-paid electronic banking cards.

==== Jakarta MRT App ====
On 27 April 2020, payment and ticket purchases began to be used on the application made by PT MRT Jakarta, namely the MRT-J application. Users of electronic wallets must connect their wallet with an app provided by MRT Jakarta (MRT-J) and buy single trip tickets in the form of QR codes. Payment through this application uses several digital wallet services, namely OVO, Dana, LinkAja, ShopeePay, MotionPay, GoPay, and AstraPay. After the user makes a payment, the user only needs to bring the mobile phone closer to the QR code reader at the passenger door so that the door opens automatically. Passengers are required to tap their cards at the fare gates when entering and exiting the paid area of the stations.

=== KAI Commuter Multi Trip Card ===
Since October 2021, the KAI Commuter Multi Trip Card (KMT) can be used on the Jakarta MRT service. However, until now the use of KMT is still a trial application along with the Jakarta LRT and Transjakarta services.

== Safety and security ==
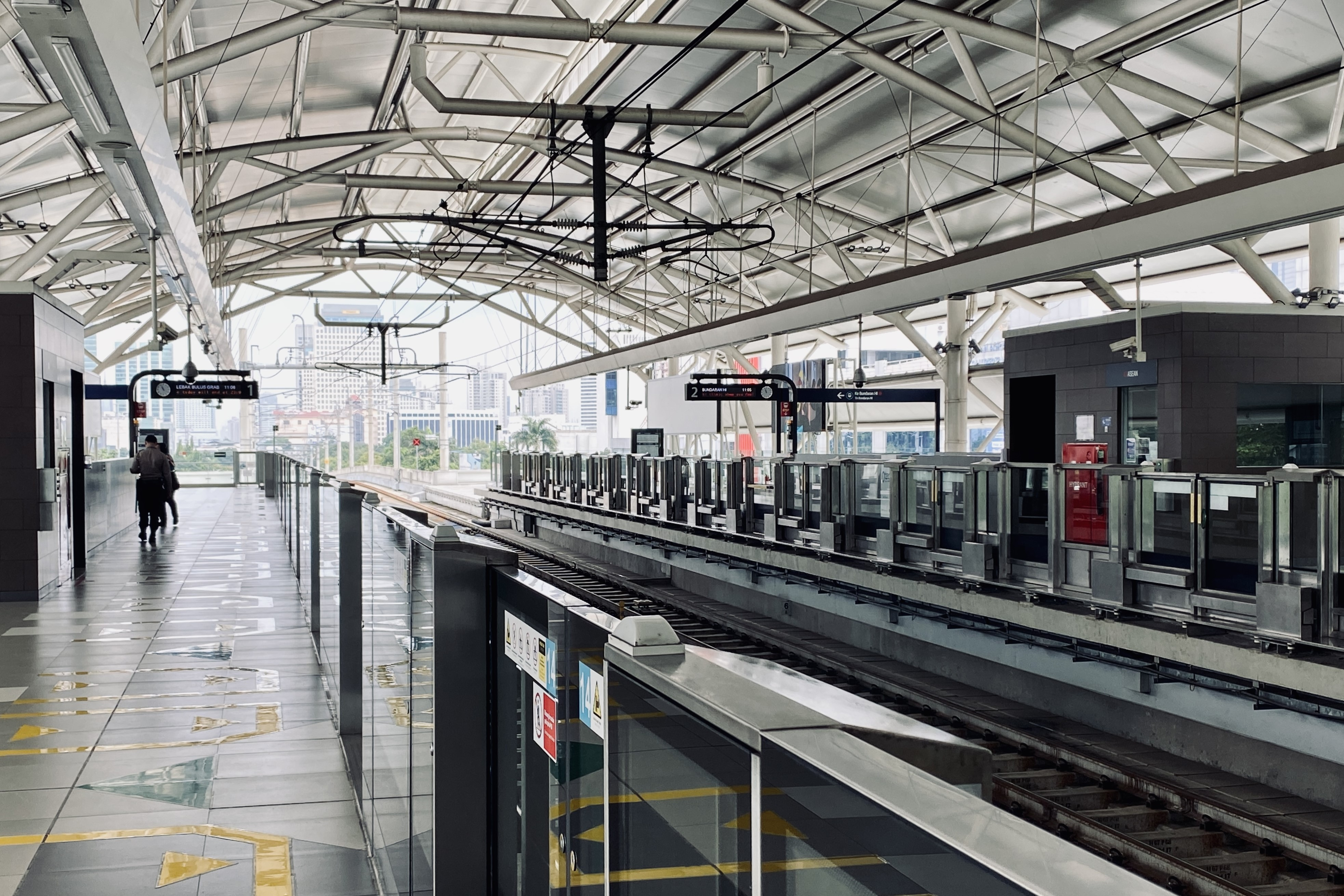
Platform screen doors at ASEAN MRT station

To prevent track incursions, half-height and full-height platform screen doors (PSDs) are installed at platforms of elevated and underground stations respectively.

Trains and stations are equipped with CCTVs, which are monitored from the control room. Medical rooms are also available at every station to provide first-aid to passengers and workers, if necessary. Security officers are regularly stationed at station entrances and platforms.

All stations are equipped with X-ray machines and walk through metal detectors for passengers entering the MRT system.

== Rolling stock ==
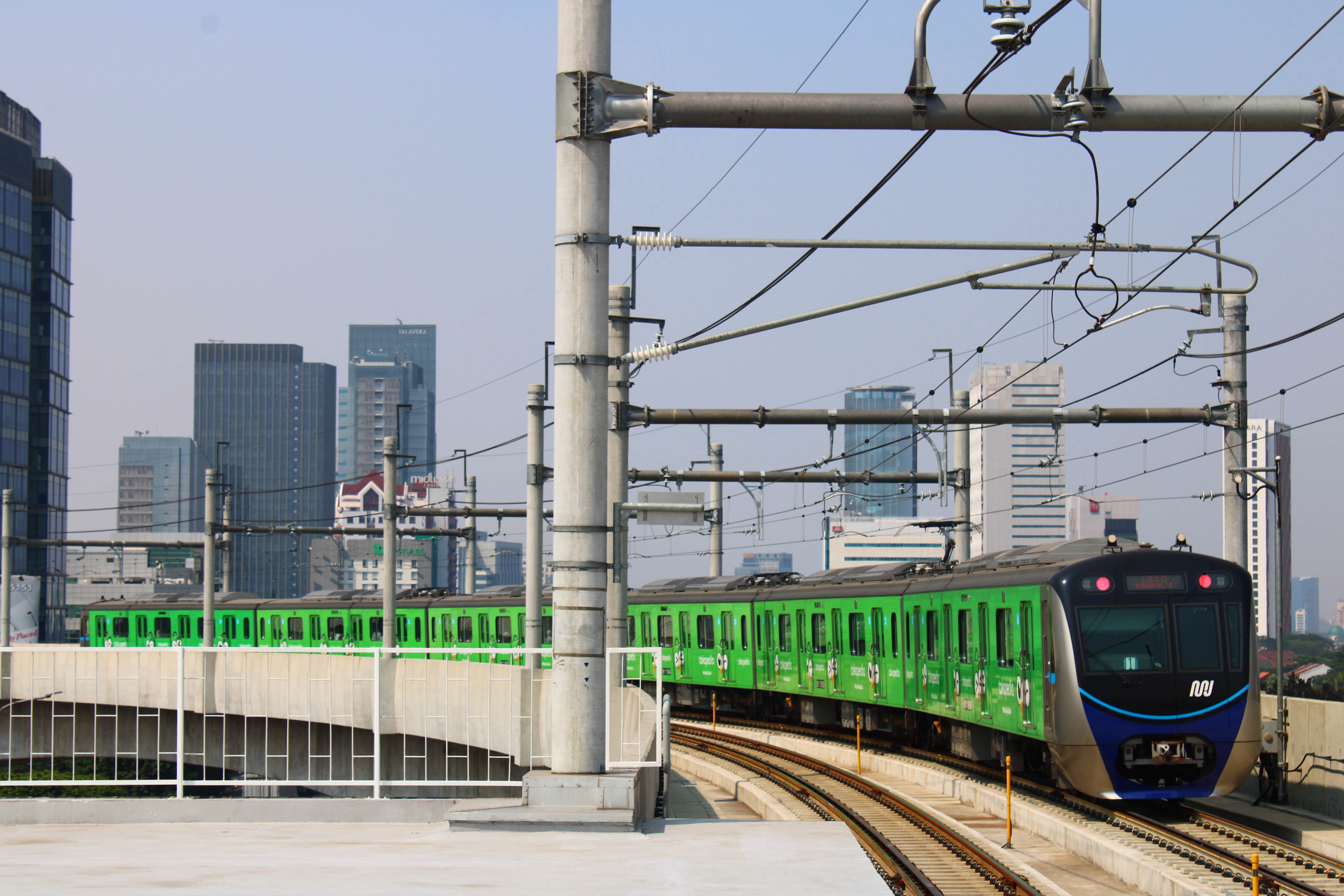
Jakarta MRT set 01 departing from Fatmawati Station

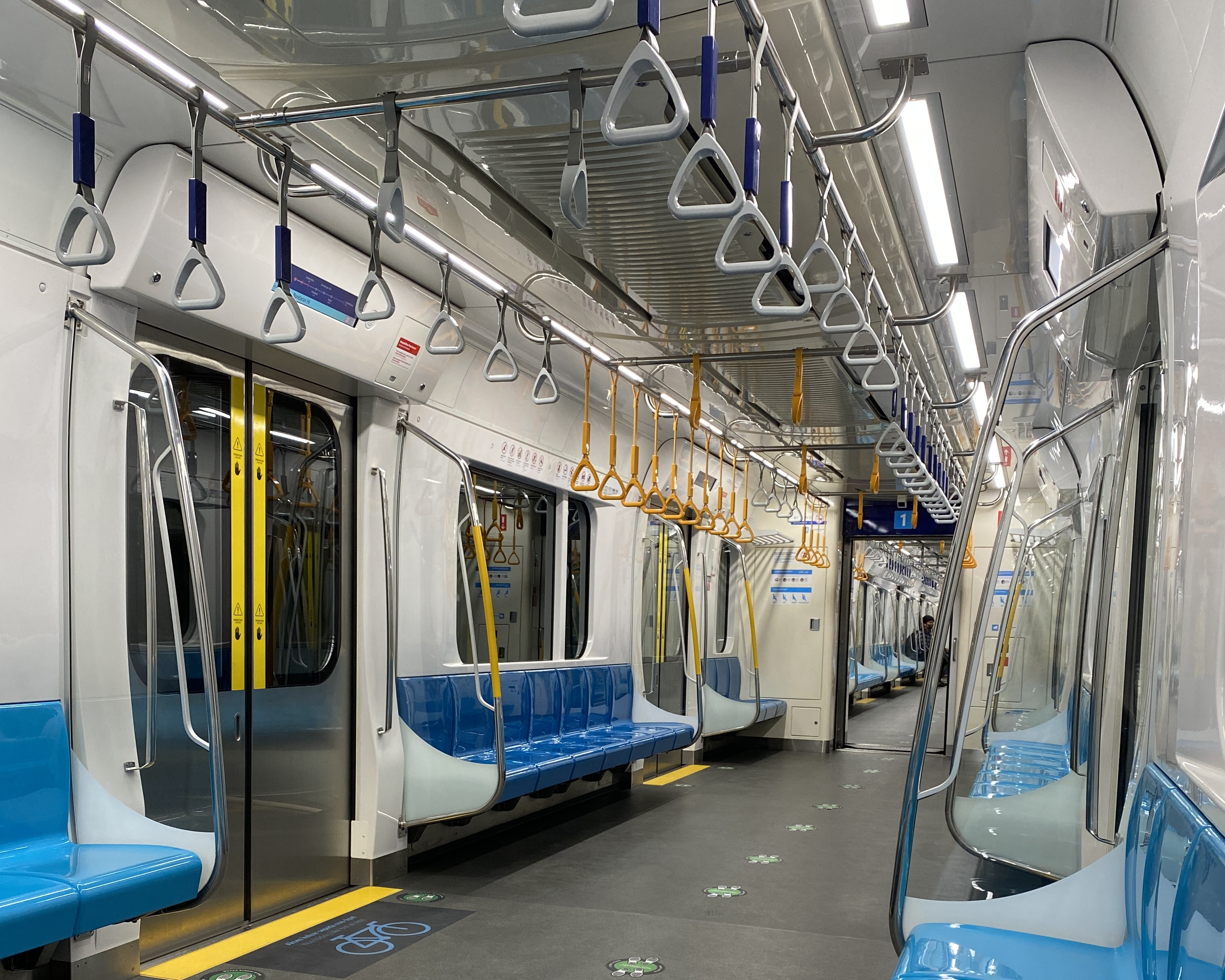
Inside the train

Contract CP 108 for the procurement of rolling stock for the Jakarta MRT was awarded to a consortium led by Sumitomo Corporation on 3 March 2015. A total of 16 six-cars trainsets were ordered at a cost of ¥10.8 billion (Rp145 billion). The trains were built in Nippon Sharyo's plant in Toyokawa, Aichi.

Each car measures 20 m (65 ft 7 in) in length, 2.9 m (9 ft 6 in) in width, and 3.9 m (12 ft 10 in) in height. These trains utilize the CBTC signaling system and are equipped with Automatic Train Operation (ATO) GoA 2, with drivers operating the doors and driving in case of emergency. Like the KRL Commuterline, the MRT trains are also powered via overhead catenary.

MRT Jakarta officially call the trains Ratanggas (singular Ratangga), a nickname first bestowed on 10 January 2018 by then Governor of Jakarta, Anies Baswedan. The name, which is Old Javanese for chariots, was derived from Mpu Tantular's Kakawin Sutasoma (also the source for Indonesia's national motto). It offers a women-only carriage during morning peak hours from 7AM to 9AM and in the afternoon from 5PM to 7PM.

== Company ==
PT Mass Rapid Transit Jakarta (Perseroda) is a municipally owned perseroan terbatas founded by the Government of Special Capital Region of Jakarta to operate the Jakarta MRT system. Its establishment was approved by the provincial parliament (DPRD) on 10 June 2008 and the company's incorporation was formally notarized on 17 June 2008. Due to a two-shareholder minimum in Indonesia's perseroan terbatas laws (rescinded for municipally owned corporations in 2020), only 99.98% of the shares are owned by the Government of Jakarta; the rest 0.02% is owned by Perumda Pasar Jaya (a municipal public corporation of Jakarta operating marketplaces). Therefore, PT MRT Jakarta (Perseroda) is the first operating railway company in Indonesia that is not wholly or partly owned by state-owned company Kereta Api Indonesia, and one of the only such companies besides PT LRT Jakarta.

== Incidents ==
- On 30 May 2024, an iron beam being lifted with a crane fell onto the track when a trainset was passing near Blok M station, causing fire sparks and a power outage on the trainset. The service of the entire North–South Line was temporarily halted to evacuate the iron beam and check the condition of tracks and signaling. No human victims were reported and all passengers of each operating trainset were evacuated to the nearest station. The investigation reported that the crane suddenly lost power and lost grip of the beam due to electromagnetic induction caused by the trainset passing nearby, thus the beam was pulled onto the tracks by electromagnetic force. PT Hutama Karya (Corp), responsible for the construction project, apologized for the accident and agreed with PT MRT Jakarta to increase safe zone for the crane to be at least 8 meters from the MRT tracks, up from previously agreed 6 meters. The North–South Line returned to normal service the next day.

== See also ==
- Greater Jakarta Integrated Mass Transit System
- Transport in Indonesia
- Transport in Jakarta
  - KRL Commuterline
  - Jakarta LRT
  - Jabodebek LRT
  - TransJakarta
- Rail transport in Indonesia
