= Iflix =

Malaysian TV streaming service

Iflix Ltd.
- Company type: Subsidiary
- Website type: OTT platform
- Available in: Arabic, Bengali, Burmese, Chinese, English, Filipino, Indonesian, Khmer, Malay, Nepali, Sinhalese, Tamil, Thai, Urdu, Vietnamese
- Founded: 2014; 12 years ago
- Headquarters: Kuala Lumpur, {{{location_country}}}
- Area served: List: Bangladesh; Brunei; Cambodia; Indonesia; Malaysia; Middle East; Myanmar; Nepal; Philippines; Sri Lanka; Thailand; Vietnam
- Products: Video streaming, video on demand, digital advertising
- Services: video streaming; content licensing; Film production; film distribution; television production; digital advertising
- Parent: Tencent
- Website: www.iflix.com
- Users: 25 million (As of 2020)

WeTV iflix, or simply iflix, is a Malaysian free and subscription based over-the-top VOD streaming service focused on emerging markets. Its global headquarters are in Kuala Lumpur, Malaysia. The site serves as a digital hosting and distribution platform for Western, Asian regional and local TV shows and films obtained through partnerships with over 150 studios and content distributors globally.

Iflix is currently available in four countries across Asia including Malaysia, Indonesia, the Philippines and Vietnam. As of April 2020, Iflix has more than 25 million active users on its service, with over 2.5 billion minutes viewed in a month.

== History ==
=== Foundation and establishment ===
Iflix was founded by Patrick Grove, CEO of Catcha Group, Mark Britt and Evolution Media, a merchant bank focused on the media, sports, and entertainment industries. Iflix was created for the rapidly growing, emerging middle-class population and their increasing demand for entertainment content. The company set out to address a certain set of conditions, which tend to exist universally across emerging markets – prevalence of piracy, inconsistent infrastructure, inconsistent quality and distribution of internet connectivity, expensive and limited mobile data, low paid television penetration, low credit-card penetration and a lack of familiarity with online payment options – through technology and commercial partnerships.

In April 2015, Iflix announced the completion of a $30 million round of funding, led by international investment firm Catcha Group and telecommunications company Philippine Long Distance Telephone Company (PLDT). The company launched its service in Malaysia and the Philippines one month later, where they also announced the formation of its advisory board, composed of Hollywood business and creative leaders. By July, Iflix recorded over 100,000 subscribers, becoming Southeast Asia's fastest growing Internet TV service. Within the 12-week trial phase of its official launch in Thailand in November, Iflix drew close to 200,000 subscribers.

In March 2016, Iflix attracted a $45-million investment from European pay-TV giant Sky plc, with Indonesian firm Elang Mahkota Teknologi (Emtek) through its subsidiary, Surya Citra Media (SCM) join the investment. In June, Iflix announced its official launch in Indonesia and in August 2016, Iflix announced its official launch in Sri Lanka. It announced its official launch in Brunei on September, and the Maldives in November.

In January 2017, Iflix announced its official launch in Pakistan.

In February 2017, Iflix announced its official launch in Vietnam. That same month the company announced a joint venture with Zain, leading telecommunications group in the Middle East and Africa, establishing Iflix Arabia.

In March 2017, Iflix announced its official launch in Myanmar.

In April 2017, Iflix went live in eight countries in the MENA region. and in October 2017, Iflix launched in Nepal.

In June 2017, Iflix announced the establishment of Iflix Africa. Iflix Africa is headquartered in Cape Town, South Africa and trades commercially as 'Iflix', with launches in Nigeria, Kenya and Ghana, Sudan and Zimbabwe.

Iflix launched in Bangladesh in November 2017. Robi and Airtel customers get one year free access upon signing up.

Iflix launched its own creative production business for short-form video content Studio2:15 in March 2018, its first production was Cupid Co. in April 2018.

Iflix exited Sub-Saharan Africa in December 2018 and sold their stake in the joint-venture to Econet Media to focus on their Asian markets.

In June 2020, Tencent (owner of Tencent Video/WeTV) acquired Iflix's "content, technology, and resources" in order to grow its presence in the Southeast Asian market.

In May 2022, Iflix closed its office in Bangladesh, Nepal and Thailand.

=== Management ===
Iflix was co-founded by Mark Britt, who served as executive director, and Patrick Grove, who served as chairman.

In March 2016, Andre de Wet, ex-Naspers and PriceCheck joined iflix to head up Africa.

In October 2016, Marc Barnett joined the Iflix Group as chief operating officer. In November 2019, Mark Britt stepped down as group CEO of the company and Marc Barnett was promoted to the role.

In January 2017, former head of technology for all of Walt Disney's businesses outside of the United States, Emmanuel Frenehard, joined Iflix as chief technology officer of Iflix Group.

In March 2017, former VP, Global Television at Netflix Sean Carey was appointed the new Chief Content Officer, in place of James Bridges.

In September 2017, the company appointed Sky PLC executive, Anil Jhingan as Chief Financial and Commercial Officer.

In November 2017, Iflix appointed telecommunications executive John Saad as CEO of Iflix MENA.

In March 2018, Iflix appointed digital media trailblazer Craig Galvin to become the head of the company's creative production business for short-form video content, Studio2:15.

On 9 April 2020, Iflix's Chairman Patrick Grove and Iflix's co-founder Luke Elliott resigned from the company board.

== Strategies ==
=== Localization ===
Similar to Grab in the transport front in terms of focus market and content, Iflix's content strategy focuses on first-run local movies and original programming. Iflix has greenlit a number of projects which underpin this strategy and support home-grown talent. The emphasis on localisation includes dubbing and sub-titling content, as well as engaging local content creators to produce compelling local stories through their work.

=== Tackling piracy ===
The company says it is an alternative that is better, safer and more convenient than piracy, and that it further respects local cultural and religious standards and preferences in each market with a strategy to build and support the industry ecosystem, to generate jobs in the creative field.

== Collaborations with WeTV ==
After the acquisition in 2020, iflix and WeTV of Tencent have shared licensed and original content across two streaming platforms. The collaborations get referred to as "WeTV iflix". Both of the platforms still operate autonomously with shared strategies.

== Partnerships ==
Iflix works with selected studios and telecommunications companies both regionally and worldwide, having partnerships with PLDT Group for commercial distribution and the landmark content partnerships with a number of Hollywood's studios; including The Walt Disney Company, Metro-Goldwyn-Mayer (MGM), Paramount Pictures, Warner Bros, Fox, and Starz. It also announced together with Vimond Media Solutions, which plans to establish a jointly operated development centre in Kuala Lumpur.

In August 2015, Iflix announced that MGM, had become an investor in the business. MGM's chairman and chief executive officer Gary Barber sits on iflix's advisory board and the companies' extensive multi-year content licensing partnership.

In September 2015, Iflix entered into an agreement with Malaysian telecommunications giant, Digi Telecommunication Sdn Bhd (Digi) to provide Iflix's service to Digi customers in Malaysia.

In December 2015, Iflix announced partnerships in Malaysia and the Philippines with leading telecommunications providers, Smart Communications (Smart) and Philippine Long Distance Telephone Company (PLDT) in the Philippines and Telekom Malaysia (TM) in Malaysia. Iflix will provide its service to over 70 million Smart and PLDT HOME customers in the Philippines for free. In conjunction with Telekom Malaysia (TM), all TM Unifi and select Streamyx customers are offered a free 12-month iflix subscriptions.

In April 2016, Iflix announced partnership with leading telecommunications services company in Indonesia, Telkom Indonesia, and Indonesian network provider Indosat Ooredoo. On 18 November 2016, iflix launched its services in the Maldives in collaboration with the flagship telecommunication services provider in the country, Dhiraagu. In September 2017, iflix entered Bangladeshi market through the partnership with the third leading telecommunication service provider of the country, Robi.

In February 2017, Iflix announced a joint venture with Zain, leading telecommunications group in the Middle East and Africa, establishing Iflix Arabia.

In January 2018, Iflix announced a joint venture with Football Malaysia LLP to develop and produce new content formats, competitions and live stream matches, including Liga Super, Piala Malaysia, marquee Piala FA and selected Liga Premier matches on a dedicated "Football Malaysia on Iflix" channel.

In March 2021, Iflix announced a joint venture with ABS-CBN Entertainment, to give global viewers a taste of Philippine entertainment first before it gets broadcast on free TV.

=== Partnerships with celebrities ===
Several notable celebrities have invested in Iflix. In July 2015, Malaysian actress Maya Karin and TV host Sazzy Falak joined Iflix as ambassadors and shareholders.

In November of the same year, Iflix welcomed Philippine celebrities Iza Calzado, Jasmine Curtis-Smith, Ruffa Gutierrez, Raymond Gutierrez, Richard Gutierrez, JM Rodriguez and Karylle Tatlonghari-Yuzon as partners in the business.

Thai celebrities; including actresses 'Jieb' Sopidnapa Chumpanee and 'Aom' Phiyada Akkraseranee, 'Jeab' Lalana Kongtoranin, Note Panayanggool and 'Paule' Ponphan Sittinawawit also joined the company as both investors and advisors in the curation of new content for online viewers.

In September 2017, Pakistan's biggest rockstar, Ali Zafar, joined Iflix as a celebrity parther.

In January 2018, Myanmar Academy Award-winning actress, Phway Phway, joined Iflix as a celebrity partner.

== Geographic availability ==
Year	Month	Country launch
2015	May	Malaysia, Philippines
2015	November	Thailand
2016	June	Indonesia
2016	August	Sri Lanka
2016	September	Brunei
2016	November	Maldives
2017	January	Pakistan
2017	February	Vietnam
2017	March	Myanmar
2017	April	Bahrain, Egypt, Iraq, Jordan, Kuwait, Lebanon, Saudi Arabia, Sudan
2017	July	Cambodia
2017	October	Nepal
2017	November	Bangladesh
2018	April	Morocco

== List of programs ==
Iflix has the rights to distribute certain programs.

=== Licensed content ===
- Naagin
- Mann Mayal
- Da One That Ghost Away
- Petrang Kabayo
- Huwag Kang Mangamba (in collaboration with WeTV)
- The Mall, the Merrier!
- FPJ's Ang Probinsyano (in collaboration with WeTV)
- James and Pat and Dave
- Pangako Sa'yo (2015)
- On The Wings Of Love
- Ang Dalawang Mrs Reyes
- La Luna Sangre
- Camp Sawi
- Unexpectedly Yours
- Cicak Man (film series)
- Sid and Aya (Not A Love Story)
- Dolce Amore

=== Original content ===
- Shut! Your Mouth
  - Oi! Jaga Mulut
  - Hoy! Bibig Mo
  - Oi! Jaga Lambe
- Half
- Magic Hour: The Series
- Magic Hour: The Series 2
- Tough Luck
- Coconuts TV on iflix
- Caraoke Drift
- Cupid Co.
- Live Life with Kris
- Sing Shower
- KL Gangster: Underworld
- Slang Along
- Gila Gamerz
- Bangkit: 11 Days That Changed a Nation
- Mystified
- Rise to Power: A KL Gangster Underworld Movie
- Ombak Rindu: The Series
- Beauty and the Boss
- Section St. Valentine: The Disappearance of Divine
- B&B: The Story of the Battle of Brody & Brandy
- Boyfriend No. 13

=== Live sports ===
In May 2017, Iflix streams Indonesia's Liga 1 and the Floyd Mayweather Jr. vs. Conor McGregor fight in Indonesia, and the 2017 T10 Cricket League in Bangladesh.

A year later, Iflix launched the "Football Malaysia on Iflix" channel to live stream Malaysia Super League, Malaysia Cup, Malaysia Charity Cup, and marquee Malaysia FA Cup matches in Malaysia.

Later in September 2018, Iflix streams UAAP men's basketball games in the Philippines.

In November 2018, Iflix shows all Indonesian Basketball League games live in Indonesia, via both iflix LIVE channels: tvOne (one game per series only) and Usee Prime.

==== ZSports launch ====
On 18 March 2019, iflix has launched a free-to-air sports linear channel, ZSports, across Brunei, Cambodia, Indonesia, Malaysia, Myanmar, Thailand, and Vietnam, via iflix Live.

The ZSports launch coincides with the NCAA Division I Basketball Championships, also known as March Madness, where 68 American collegiate teams will compete in a single-elimination tournament over three weeks to become national champion. ZSports will feature live coverage of most games including the Final Four games, from 20 March as well as repeat broadcasts of select games.

Additionally, ZSports provided viewers with over 1,000 hours of live sporting events a year, including NCAA basketball and football games, remaining National Hockey League's regular season games, including playoffs and Stanley Cup, X Games and motorsports, as well as local and regional sporting events catering to both hardcore and casual fans. As of 2022, this channel is no longer available.

== Features ==
=== Channels ===
In August 2017, Iflix launched Channels to showcase entertainment studios and brands, along with user'sʼ favourite content genres. The feature includes personalised onboarding, and recommendations based on user's preferences and viewing history.

=== Playlists ===
In August 2016, Iflix launched its 'Playlists' feature, consisting of curated playlists of film productions from over 150 celebrities in the Southeast Asia, as well as 'Collections' based on moods and popular themes. Notable celebrities on 'Playlists' include Afdlin Shauki, Amber Chia, Ashraf Sinclair, Michelle Ziudith and 'Ploy' Ployphan Taveerat.

=== Download and Watch Offline ===
The service also offers the option of offline viewing to its members through its 'Download and Watch Offline' feature, where subscribers can download content with a Wi-Fi connection or with mobile data to their Android and IOS devices to watch when there is no connection. Content can be downloaded in either "low", "medium" or "high" quality formats.

=== High Definition ===
In March 2017, Iflix rolled out its service in HD, with all new shows published on the platform available in HD.

=== IflixFree, IflixVIP and Iflix Live ===
In April 2018, Iflix CEO Mark Britt announced that they shift from its traditional subscription-only model into two tiers as part of its revamp, they named IflixFree, IflixVIP and Iflix Live. The free tier is an ad-supported free service which features a curated Movie of the Day, premium short-form content, promotional episodes and pilots from premium TV series and movies, premium international and local TV series for free viewing and original programming. The VIP tier is a subscription-only service which includes premium access to hundreds of movies and TV shows from local and international countries. The company also announced that they will launching Iflix Live, a live hub which features live streaming of linear local over-the-air and Pay TV channels across both tiers.
