= Vishen =

Vishen is a given name. Notable people with the name include:

- Vishen Halambage (born 2005), Sri Lankan cricketer
- Vishen Lakhiani (born 1976), Malaysian entrepreneur
