= Patrick Grove =

Australian businessman

- Born: 30 April 1975 (age 51); Singapore
- Education: Tanglin Trust School; United World College of South East Asia; Jakarta International School; The Scots College; University of Sydney
- Occupations: Internet and media entrepreneur

Patrick Y-Kin Grove (born 30 April 1975 in Singapore) is a Singaporean and Australian tech entrepreneur of mixed heritage.

He is the co-founder and Group CEO of Catcha Group, and a founder of several tech companies in the region.

Between 1999 and 2021, he took six companies from start-up to an initial public offering (IPO).

Grove is also Chairman and CEO of Catcha Investment Corp, a blank check company sponsored by Catcha Group that raised US$300m targeting technology businesses in Southeast Asia and Australia.

== Early life and education ==
Grove spent his early years in Singapore and Indonesia, where he studied at Tanglin Trust School, the United World College of South East Asia.

== Career ==
Whilst still a student at The University of Sydney, Grove started two companies. Upon graduating in 1996, he joined Arthur Andersen before leaving in June 1999 to start the dot-com company Catcha.com.

Catcha.com quickly became a high-profile dot-com in Asia and raised over US$12 million from a combination of angel investors, venture capitalists and publicly listed companies. The company received approval in principle from the Stock Exchange of Singapore in early 2000. Whilst on a global IPO roadshow, the NASDAQ crashed in April 2000 and the IPO was famously aborted as the company become a victim of the dot-com bubble.

With an aborted IPO, a collapsing media environment and US$1.5m in debt bankruptcy seemed imminent, but Grove managed to turn the company around and is credited with being one of the rare dot-com survivors.

By 2004–2005 Grove and his partners had turned around the business and completed a successful management buyout.

In 2006, Grove moved back into the online space by founding the iProperty Group which was successfully listed on the Australian Stock Exchange in 2007. He and his partners revamped and grew the business into the largest network of online property portals in Asia, operating in Malaysia, Indonesia, Singapore, Hong Kong and Macau with investments in India and the Philippines. Following a meeting with Rupert Murdoch in June 2014, he invested US$100m into the company In February 2016, the company was acquired by REA Group, a subsidiary of News Corporation for A$751m in one of the largest acquisitions of an ASEAN Internet Company

In 2009, Catcha launched Catcha Digital in partnership with Microsoft to run all their online assets in Malaysia. In July 2011, Grove listed the company on the Malaysian Stock Exchange. Following the acquisition with Says Sdn Bhd, it was re-named Rev Asia Berhad.

In 2011 Grove launched Dealmates, a Malaysian-based e-commerce site as a joint-venture with Mindvalley founder Vishen Lakhiani. In late 2013, Grove co-founded the iBuy Group (which included Dealmates) and was successfully listed on the Australian Stock Exchange.

In September 2012, Grove listed the third company he founded, iCar Asia, on the Australian Securities Exchange. iCar owns and operates ASEAN's largest network of online automotive sites in Malaysia, Indonesia and Thailand. In July 2021, Grove announced iCAR and Carsome to merge to create the Carsome Group, Malaysia's 1st Unicorn.

Following their success with iProperty, Grove teamed up with former iProperty CEO Shaun DiGregorio in 2014 to launch Frontier Digital Ventures, a digital investment firm focused on online classifieds businesses in emerging markets. The company listed on the ASX in August 2016, marking Grove and Catcha Group’s fifth successful IPO, and currently owns stakes in 15 companies operating in 20 countries across South Asia, Latin America and the Middle East and Africa.

In 2015, Grove co-founded iflix, a subscription video-on-demand service focused on emerging markets. Iflix was sold to Tencent in 2020.

In the same year, Grove co-founded and launched Wild Digital as a platform to bring together the top entrepreneurs, executives and investors in the Southeast Asian digital ecosystem. Today, Wild Digital is one of the leading tech conferences in the region and has hosted speakers including Anthony Tan of Grab, Tan Sri Tony Fernandes of AirAsia, Achmad Zaky of Bukalapak and Leontinus Alpha Edis of Tokopedia.

In 2017, Grove co-founded and invested in co-working space operator Common Ground.

In February 2021, Catcha Group listed a blank check company, Catcha Investment Corp, of which Grove is Chairman and CEO, on the NYSE. The company raised gross proceeds of $300m in their Initial Public Offering to target technology businesses in Southeast Asia and Australia.

In March 2023, Grove was appointed as the Chairman of Catcha Digital Berhad, a digital conglomerate listed on the Kuala Lumpur Stock Exchange.

=== Business strategy ===
Focusing on investments within the online sector, Patrick Grove has made his mark with a simple strategy: look at what works in the West and bring it to the East. "When I was growing up and I looked at the wealthiest people in Asia, it was never anyone who invented anything. It was just someone who took an idea from the West and brought it to Asia ... I decided to do the same."

Historically, Grove has focused on emerging markets saying. He is especially bullish about the business opportunities presented by Southeast Asia.

=== Television work / References ===
Grove served as one of the judges on the reality TV series Angel's Gate, which began broadcasting on Channel NewsAsia in February 2012. The show gives budding entrepreneurs an opportunity to pitch business ideas to investors. Grove also appeared as a guest judge in Episode 2 The Apprentice: ONE Championship Edition. in June 2021. He was also referenced in Selling Sunset Season 4 as a property Investor from Singapore that bought a Hollywood Hills home from Harry Styles

== Recognition ==
Among the awards and recognition Grove has received for his entrepreneurial achievements are:

- 2000: Named a "Global Leader of Tomorrow" by the World Economic Forum
- 2002: Named a "New Asian Leader" by the World Economic Forum
- 2004: "Austcham Young Entrepreneur of the Year"
- 2007: Recognised by KLue magazine among the "Top 40 under 40 to watch"
- 2008: Named as one of "Asia's Best Young Entrepreneurs 2008" by Bloomberg Businessweek
- 2011: Inaugural listing on the "BRW Young Rich List", part of the annual BRW Rich 200
- 2013: Named in the Australia Unlimited "50 Global Achievers" list
- 2014: Judge in Talent Unleashed Awards, alongside Sir Richard Branson and Steve Wozniak.
- 2016: Inaugural listing on the "Forbes Annual List of 50 Richest Malaysians" [Forbes Malaysia's 50 Richest]
- 2021: The University of Sydney University 2021 Alumni Award for International Achievement.
- 2021: Finalist in the Advance Awards for Technology and Entrepreneurship by the Australian Government

== Personal life ==
Grove was born in Singapore on 30 April 1975 to a Singaporean/Malaysian-Chinese mother and an Australian father. He has two brothers and a sister.

In May 2016, Grove's net worth was estimated as A$587 million by the BRW Rich 200 list, an annual list of the richest Australian people. As of 2019, Grove's net worth was estimated by the Financial Review 2019 Rich List as A$885 million. Grove was first recognised in the Forbes 2016 list of 50 richest Malaysians. As of 2019, Forbes estimated his net worth as US$400 million.
