= Says Sdn Bhd =

- Industry: Websites
- Predecessor: Youthsays Sdn Bhd
- Founded: 2010; 16 years ago
- Fate: Merged with Catcha Group
- Successor: Rev Media Equity Holdings Sdn Bhd
- Headquarters: Petaling Jaya, Malaysia
- Website: says.com/my

Says Sdn Bhd was a Malaysian company based in Petaling Jaya, Malaysia, that operated the web site says.com/my The company was formerly known as Youthsays Sdn Bhd. Since its point of inception in 2010, Says Sdn Bhd has served over 80 leading brands including Nike, Coca-Cola, Unilever, Maxis and Nestle. On 8 October 2013, Says Sdn Bhd completed a $20 million merger with Catcha Media Berhad's subsidiaries to form a new company, Rev Media Equity Holdings Sdn Bhd (Rev Asia) Effective 12 December 2013, Says Sdn Bhd became Rev Social Malaysia Sdn Bhd.

== Products ==
Says.com is Malaysia's fastest growing news website, generating over one million unique visitors since as of October 2013 In 2010, the beta version of what is known today as Says.com was launched. In January 2011, Says Sdn Bhd bought the Says.com domain for US$40,000 and launched Says.com global on 31 May 2012, further expanding the social news network into India, Philippines, Singapore and Australia. In April 2013, advertiser-sponsored content was migrated from Says.com onto a newly designed private rewards club called 8Share.

8Share was founded in April 2013 and is a country-specific platform where social media users are paid to broadcast advertiser-sponsored content. This content, called ‘Specials,’ ranges from the latest videos, movie trailers, contests and events to product offers by Indonesian brands that choose to promote their content via 8Share users. 8Share has worked on over 1,500 successful campaigns for 70 of the largest advertisers in the region including Nike, Coke, Nestle, Unilever and Samsung.

== Merger with Catcha Media ==
In May 2013, Says Sdn Bhd entered an approximate RM60 million merger with Catcha Media, in which Catcha Media subsidiaries and Says.com will come together to form a digital advertising business. In a statement from former CEO Khailee Ng (now Chairman of Rev Asia) said that Says.com is designed to put advertiser content at the centre of social attention, positioning brands to capture the new generation of consumers - “We see a shift towards the advertising of the future, where marketing messages take shape as sharable ‘social’ content rather than the way it presently appears to users - as interruptions."
