= Catcha Digital =

Catcha Digital Berhad
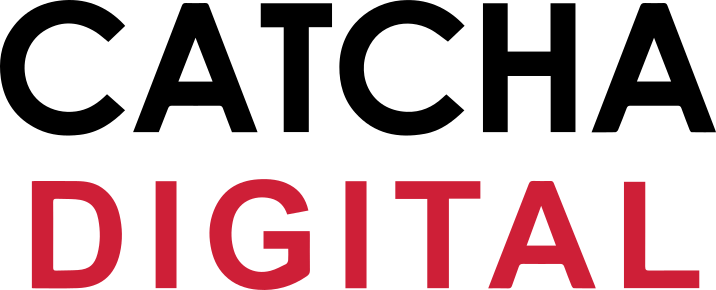
- Formerly: REV Asia Holdings
- Type: Publicly traded company
- Traded as: MYX: 0173
- Industry: Digital media, advertising, B2B exhibitions, IT solutions
- Founded: October 8, 2013; 13 years ago
- Headquarters: Petaling Jaya, Selangor, Malaysia
- Key people: Patrick Grove, Chairman; Eric Tan, CEO; Voon Tze Khay, iMedia CEO
- Number of employees: c. 260 (December 2025)
- Website: https://www.catchadigital.com/

Catcha Digital Berhad (formerly known as REV Asia Holdings) (MYX: 0173) is a Malaysian serial acquirer and holding company listed on the ACE Market of Bursa Malaysia. After exiting Guidance Note 2 (GN2) status in 2023, it built a portfolio of majority-owned businesses across three pillars: digital media and advertising, business-to-business (B2B) trade exhibitions, and IT solutions. The group completed seven acquisitions in 2025 and one in the first quarter of 2026, and describes its aim as being a permanent home for market-leading companies. The Edge Malaysia has described it as a serial buyer of small but profitable businesses.

== History ==
=== Origins and sale to Media Prima ===
The company traces its origins to 8 October 2013, when certain Catcha Media Berhad (Catcha Media) subsidiaries merged with Says Sdn Bhd. The merger deal, valued at MYR60 million, was first announced in May 2013 and completed in July. The new company that resulted was named Rev Asia Holdings Sdn Bhd or Rev Asia for short.

On May 8, 2017, Media Prima Bhd, Malaysia's largest integrated media group, announced the acquisition of 100 per cent equity interest in REV Asia Holdings Sdn Bhd, a subsidiary of Rev Asia Bhd and one of Southeast Asia's leading digital media groups, for RM105 million. Having sold its operating business, the listed company slipped into GN2 status in August 2017, a classification for cash companies that have sold their key assets.

=== GN2 and the acquisition of iMedia (2020–2023) ===
On September 1, 2020, Rev Asia Bhd announced through Bursa that it would acquire iMedia Asia Sdn Bhd, a digital media company focused on content, technology and social influencer marketing, as part of its regularisation plan. The deal was subject to approval. iMedia owns and represents some digital properties which have a combined reach of over 8 million Malaysians monthly. iMedia clients include some of the largest tech companies in the region such as Shopee (SEA Group), iQiyi (Baidu), Foodpanda, Huawei and top global brands such as McDonald's, L'Oréal, Fonterra and Mercedes.

The acquisition was preceded by the appointment of a new group chief executive, Eric Tan, on 2 January 2023 and of Patrick Grove as chairman on 1 March 2023. In March 2023, Catcha Digital Bhd completed the acquisition of the entire equity interest of iMedia Asia Sdn Bhd for RM43.92 million in cash and shares. The acquisition enabled it to reach 12.7 million Malaysians and serve over 100 brands across various industries, and the regularisation plan included a rights issue with a minimum subscription of RM18 million from its major shareholder, Catcha Group.

In July 2023, Catcha Digital Berhad announced the upliftment of its GN2 status and the completion of its regularisation plan, after raising RM29.7 million from the rights issue. Its subsidiary iMedia had posted a record profit before tax of RM10.28 million in FYE 2022, up 69% year on year. As of 2024, digital assets under Catcha Digital Berhad acquired by iMedia include Malay, English and Chinese-language portals such as OhMedia, BeautifulNara, Goody25, Headline Media, Ittify, Mortify, and more.

=== Acquisition-led growth (2023–present) ===
Shortly after the GN2 exit, in October 2023, iMedia agreed to buy the remaining 49% of influencer platform Ittify for RM3.43 million and a 30% stake in Headline Media, the publisher of WeirdKaya, for RM1.24 million, with an option over a further 50%. In 2024 the company announced a joint venture with Khairy Jamaluddin and Shahril Hamdan to launch the digital media business KS Lagi, and in September said it had signed letters of intent with eight acquisition targets, six in media and two in enterprise software.

The pace picked up from late 2024, when it announced three acquisitions in the fourth quarter: Nexible Solutions (software), Tastefully Malaysia (consumer food expos) and Drive 2 Digital (automotive digital media). In 2025 it completed seven acquisitions in total, including its entry into B2B trade exhibitions through One International Exhibition in August, and Framemotion Studio and TechNave in December, while raising its stake in Headline Media to 80%. It financed these with a RM35 million revolving credit facility arranged in August 2025 and a rights issue with warrants completed in November 2025 that raised RM24.3 million. Revenue reached RM67.63 million in FY2025, up from RM38.39 million in FY2024.

In 2026 it completed its eighth acquisition in about fifteen months, the Malaysian International Food and Beverage Trade Fair (MIFB), on 31 March, buying its organiser from Constellar, a Singapore events group backed by Temasek. In May it reported a first-quarter net loss and said it would be more cautious on further acquisitions, and in August it reported first-half revenue up 114% with a statutory loss it attributed largely to acquisition-related charges.

== Serial acquirer model ==
With GN2 status lifted, Catcha Digital made acquisitions its main route to growth. In September 2024 it said it planned to raise and allocate about RM80 million for acquisitions over the following 24 months, funded by internally generated cash, rights issues and bank borrowing. In a 2025 interview with SunBiz, Tan said that making this many acquisitions is not common among Malaysian public companies.

The company's investor presentations cite four listed serial acquirers as examples of the strategy: Constellation Software (Canada, vertical market software), HEICO (United States, aerospace and defense aftermarket products), Lifco (Sweden, industrial and dental consumables) and Chapters Group (Germany, digital solutions). In a 2026 podcast interview, Tan also named Danaher and Roper Technologies among the companies he had studied.

=== Acquisition criteria and deal structure ===
Catcha Digital's investor presentations set out its approach, which it calls "programmatic M&A". Deals are divided into "platform" acquisitions, which are businesses with sufficient scale or that can reach it through a focused buy-and-build and are generally not integrated into existing companies, and "add-on" acquisitions, which are smaller purchases that extend a platform's geography, products or position in the value chain. It applies different criteria to each type:

	Platform acquisitions	Add-on acquisitions
Qualitative	Digital focus; market leader; established financial track record; entrepreneurial management team	Entrepreneurial management team; market leader; strategic value-add; high profit potential through synergies
Quantitative	Profit after tax of RM0.5 million to RM10 million; predictable revenue of 70%; growth rate above 5%; profit after tax margin above 10%	Promising operating metrics; on track to sustainable profit margins

For the deal structure, the company says it targets an internal rate of return above 20%, valuations of about 4 to 9 times earnings, and free cash flow growth of 5% to 20%. It typically acquires 51% or more with an option over the remaining stake, with payments made in tranches over 24 to 48 months and tied to profit and performance guarantees from the sellers. Its investment team follows an eight-step process (prospect, qualify, contact, introduce, analyse, negotiate, approve and execute), with approval from an investment committee of directors and management before a letter of intent is signed. The company reported that, since June 2023, it had tracked 4,467 prospects, of which 12 reached a letter of intent.

=== Operating model ===
Catcha Digital keeps acquired companies as independent operating companies. According to the company, the group provides a long-term owner and support with M&A, financing and treasury management, and requires reporting, target setting and accountability, while sellers keep operational autonomy and can realise part of their investment. Tan has said the group is not a private equity or venture capital investor and does not run a centralised conglomerate. The company cites iMedia, its first platform acquisition, as an example: it was agreed in 2021 at about RM44 million, or 12.0 times earnings, which the company calculates as 5.4 times FY2024 earnings.

== Three pillars and expansion ==
=== Acquisitions, 2024–2026 ===
By mid-2026 the company reported eight completed acquisitions in about fifteen months, across its three pillars of digital media, B2B exhibitions and IT solutions.

Target	Pillar and sector	Stake acquired	Consideration	Announced	Completed
Nexible Solutions Sdn Bhd	IT solutions (AI sales automation software)	51%	RM11.38 million, in tranches tied to profit guarantees over 36 months	28 November 2024	22 January 2025
Drive 2 Digital Sdn Bhd	Digital media (automotive)	60%	RM16.2 million	20 December 2024	7 May 2025
Tastefully Malaysia Sdn Bhd	Digital media (consumer food expos)	70%	RM7.6 million, in four tranches over 36 months	19 December 2024	18 June 2025
One International Exhibition Sdn Bhd	B2B exhibitions (agriculture, construction)	60%	RM11.38 million	14 August 2025	27 August 2025
Maxoom Sdn Bhd (TechNave)	Digital media (consumer technology)	100%	RM6.13 million	6 November 2025	December 2025
Framemotion Studio Sdn Bhd	Digital media (experiential and digital production)	60%	RM37.32 million, in three tranches over 24 months	14 March 2025	17 December 2025
Headline Media Sdn Bhd (WeirdKaya)	Digital media	30% in 2023, raised to 80%	RM4.0 million for the additional 50%	Option exercised 22 December 2025	22 December 2025
ExpoCO Sdn Bhd (MIFB, formerly Constellar Exhibitions Malaysia, a subsidiary of Singapore's Constellar, which is backed by Temasek)	B2B exhibitions (food and beverage)	100%, via One International (60% effective interest)	RM3.97 million	25 March 2026	31 March 2026

=== Funding and scrutiny ===
The 2025 acquisitions were funded by a RM24.3 million rights issue with warrants, completed in late 2025, a RM35 million revolving credit facility and operating cash flow; the company said it had well over RM100 million of acquisition capital available, including potential warrant proceeds of up to RM73 million. The Edge reported in December 2025 that investors were asking about share dilution and over-diversification, noting that the share base grew from 134.64 million to 352.08 million shares in 2023 and to about 450.6 million after the 2025 rights issue.

=== Outlook ===
The company's investor presentations describe a three-phase plan: building and growing digital companies, acquiring and scaling entrepreneur-led businesses, and expanding regionally once the Malaysian market is dominated. In May 2026 The Edge reported that the company had turned more cautious on acquisitions as advertisers pulled back, with Tan saying more deals would come once recent acquisitions were properly integrated. In August 2026 the company said it expected earnings to improve through the rest of the year as its B2B exhibitions, which are weighted to the second half, took place.

== Financial performance ==
Group revenue rose from RM23.57 million in FY2023 to RM38.39 million in FY2024. For FY2025 the company reported revenue of RM67.63 million, up 76%, and profit after tax and minority interest (PATAMI) of RM5.38 million, compared with RM5.20 million in FY2024. It also reported adjusted PATAMI of RM8.54 million, which excludes non-cash acquisition accounting items such as unwinding of interest on deferred consideration and amortisation of acquired intangibles.

For the first half of 2026 the company reported revenue of RM47.69 million, up 114% year on year, and adjusted EBITDA of RM8.69 million, up 80%. It recorded a statutory loss after tax and minority interest of RM1.69 million, which it attributed substantially to non-cash and acquisition-related charges, including a one-off long-term incentive plan charge.
