= Catcha Group =

International internet group

- Type: Private Limited Company
- Industry: Media, Internet, Online Classifieds and E-Commerce
- Founded: 2004
- Founders: Patrick Grove, Ken Tsurumaru and Luke Elliott
- Headquarters: Malaysia and Singapore
- Area served: Asia, Malaysia, Singapore, Hong Kong, Indonesia, Philippines, India
- Key people: Patrick Grove (Group CEO) and Luke Elliott
- Total assets: US$ 1 billion
- Number of employees: 1000+ (2013)
- Website: www.catchagroup.com

Catcha Group is an international Internet group founded by entrepreneur Patrick Grove. The group controls a number of publicly listed and private media, new media, online classifieds, and e-commerce businesses and is one of the largest investors in the digital sector in emerging markets, notably ASEAN. Catcha Group and its related entities have completed over 50 investments either directly or indirectly, as sole, majority, or minority shareholders.

Since its founding, Catcha Group has completed a number of transactions with a total of six IPOs in fourteen years, including the 2007 listing of iProperty Group on the Australian Securities Exchange, REV Asia Berhad (previously Catcha Media Berhad) on Bursa Malaysia in 2011, and the subsequent IPOs of iCar Asia in 2012, Ensogo (previously iBuy Group) in 2013, and Frontier Digital Ventures in 2016; all three on the Australian Securities Exchange. In February 2021, the group listed a blank check company, Catcha Investment Corp, on the NYSE. The company raised $300m in gross proceeds in their initial public offering to target technology businesses in Southeast Asia and Australia.

== Portfolio ==
Some of the notable companies started or invested in by Catcha Group include:

- iProperty Group – owner and operator of an asian network of property websites,
- iCar Asia Limited – ASEAN’s largest network of online automotive sites.
- iflix – Southeast Asian Internet TV service. The company launched in March 2015, and is now available in Malaysia, Philippines, Thailand and Indonesia.
- Frontier Digital Ventures – operator of online classified businesses with a focus in frontier markets. Founded in May 2014 and headquartered in Kuala Lumpur, the company's primary expertise is in automotive portals, property portals and general classified websites.
- Rev Asia Berhad (previously Catcha Media Berhad) – Malaysia's leading digital media group that had Rev Asia Holdings, as one of its subsidiaries. The company was listed on the Malaysian Stock Exchange in July 2011, following the completion of the merger between certain Catcha Media Berhad (Catcha Media) subsidiaries and Says Sdn Bhd on 8 October 2013, a new company, Rev Asia Holdings Sdn Bhd (Rev Asia) was formed. In May 2017, Rev Asia Berhad sold off Rev Asia Holdings for US$24 million to Media Prima.
- Instahome – online home rental platform. The company was co-founded in 2020 by Catcha Group co-founder and CEO Patrick Grove together with his former Chief of Staff, Eric Tan.
- Boozebud – Australia’s no.1 pure play online alcohol retailer. Boozebud was founded in 2013 and sold to Carlton & United Breweries in 2016 before undergoing a management buyout in January 2021 backed by Catcha Group.
- Catcha Investment Corp – A blank check company sponsored by Catcha Group and listed on the NYSE, targeting technology businesses in Southeast Asia and Australia.

== Investment strategy ==
Focusing on investments within the online sector, Catcha Group’s investment strategy involves looking at ideas that have worked in more mature markets and looking at how they can be brought to emerging markets, particularly Southeast Asia.

The Group's investment strategy also relies on the use of mergers & acquisitions for growth and the public markets to carry them out.
