= Vishen Lakhiani =

Malaysian entrepreneur, author (born 1976)

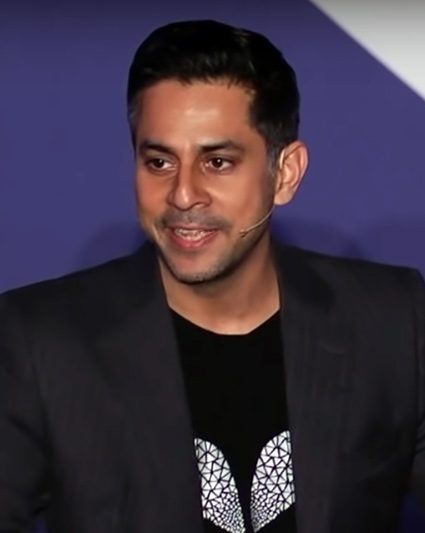
- Lakhiani in 2018
- Born: 14 January 1976 (age 50); Kuala Lumpur, Malaysia
- Education: Bachelor of Engineering
- Alma mater: University of Michigan
- Occupations: Entrepreneur; Author; Speaker
- Title: Founder & CEO

Vishen Lakhiani (born 14 January 1976) is a Malaysian entrepreneur, author, and motivational speaker of Indian descent. He is the founder and CEO of Mindvalley and author of two books: The Code of the Extraordinary Mind and The Buddha and the Badass.

== Career ==
Lakhiani was born and raised in Kuala Lumpur into a Sindhi family whose ancestors originated in Sindh. Lakhiani attended a Malaysian state school. After graduating from high school, he moved to the United States and attended the University of Michigan, where he received a bachelor's degree in computer engineering. During his university years, he was an active member of AIESEC. After graduating in 2001, he moved to Silicon Valley.

=== Mindvalley ===
Mindvalley is an educational technology company co-founded by Lakhiani and Michael Reining that publishes products focused on personal spiritual development and lifelong learning, such as the meditation app Omvana. Founded in New York City in December 2002, Reining and Lakhiani were forced to relocate Mindvalley to Kuala Lumpur, Malaysia, in 2004 when the United States declined to renew Lakhiani's work visa.

In late 2020, Mindvalley added a course, hosted by Lakhiani, on the Silva Method for accessing altered states of mind and intuition.

=== Dealmates ===
Dealmates was a Malaysia-based e-commerce site that Lakhiani founded on 1 November 2010 with Patrick Grove, as part of a joint venture between Catcha Group and Mindvalley.

=== Books ===
In May 2016, Lakhiani published the self-help book The Code of the Extraordinary Mind through Rodale, Inc. In the book, Lakhiani argues a person's outlook on life is shaped by conditioning and habit, offering ten laws to help readers break free of this mindset. After its release, the book reached No. 10 on the New York Times Bestseller List for Advice, How-To & Miscellaneous.

In 2020 Lakhiani's second book, The Buddha & the Badass, was published by Penguin-RandomHouse. The book peaked at No. 1 on the Wall Street Journal Business Hardcover List and No. 9 on the New York Times How-To list.
