= Achmad Zaky =

Indonesian entrepreneur

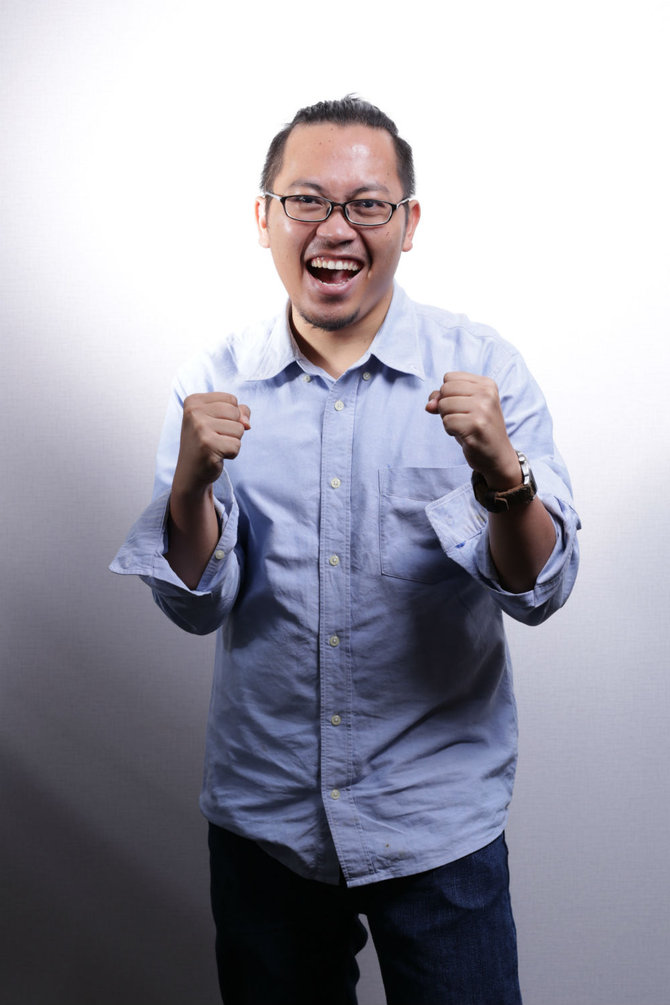
- Born: Achmad Zaky; 24 August 1986 (age 40); Sragen, Central Java, Indonesia
- Education: Bandung Institute of Technology; HEC Paris
- Occupations: Internet entrepreneur; investor
- Known for: Co-founder of Bukalapak; Co-founder of init 6
- Title: CEO, Bukalapak (2010–2020)
- Spouse: Diajeng Lestari
- Children: 2
- Awards: EY Indonesia Entrepreneur of the Year (2017); Satyalancana Wirakarya (2016)

Achmad Zaky (born 24 August 1986) is an internet entrepreneur and investor. He is a co-founder and the former chief executive officer (CEO) of Bukalapak, an e-commerce company in Indonesia.

== Education ==
Zaky started learning computer and programming sciences in 1997, through books on programming, and a computer given by his uncle. He represented his school at the National Science Olympic event in computer science and won the competition while he was attending high school at Public High School 1 in Solo.

Zaky studied informatics engineering at Bandung Institute of Technology (ITB).

== Business career ==
=== Bukalapak ===
Bukalapak was co-founded by Achmad Zaky in 2010.

Zaky began his career in technology and entrepreneurship while studying at ITB. He was offered a project to make a quick count software for a television station that was monitoring the national election at that time, with a value of IDR 1.5 million. He also tried to build a culinary business that specialises in noodle making, but it was unsuccessful. Following his graduation, Zaky formed a technology consulting firm named Suitmedia. Zaky led Bukalapak as the company's CEO until he resigned in January 2020.

=== init 6 ===
Following his departure, he started a new venture with Bukalapak's former chief technology officer, Nugroho Herucahyono, who exited the company too. The duo founded Init6, a venture fund that supports early-stage startups.

== Personal life ==
In October 2010, Zaky married Diajeng Lestari, who is the founder of Hijup. They have a child named Laiqa Anzani.

== Awards and honors ==
Zaky established Bukalapak in 2010. In July 2016, he received the Satyalancana Wira Karya award from President Joko Widodo for his exemplary contributions to Indonesia. He was also named EY Entrepreneur of the Year in 2017 for the Technology & Digital Award category.
