= Moji (TV network) =

Indonesian television broadcaster

- Type: Television broadcaster
- Country: Indonesia
- Broadcast area: Nationwide
- Headquarters: SCTV Tower, Senayan City, Jakarta

Programming
- Languages: Indonesian, English
- Picture format: 1080i HDTV (downscaled to 16:9 576i for the SDTV feed)

Ownership
- Owner: Emtek
- Sister channels: SCTV; Indosiar; Ajwa TV; Mentari TV

History
- Founded: 8 November 1991
- Launched: 9 August 2004 (trial broadcast); 16 June 2005 (official broadcast as O Channel); 21 August 2022 (as Moji)
- Founder: Emtek; MRA Media
- Former names: O Channel (2004–2022)

Links
- Website: moji.id

Availability

Terrestrial
- Digital terrestrial television Greater Jakarta: 24 (UHF); Channel 35
- Digital terrestrial television Regional branches: Check local frequencies (in Indonesian language)

Streaming media
- Vidio: Watch live (subscription required outside Indonesia)
- IndiHome TV: Watch live (IndiHome customers only)

PT Omni Intivision (formerly known as PT Gendis Citrarahayu), operated as Moji, stylized as mOȷı, previously O Channel, is an Indonesian free-to-air television broadcaster. It was founded by Emtek and MRA Media. In 2007, MRA Media sold its stake in O Channel to Emtek. Initially, it broadcast as a local station in Jakarta. It's primary programming focusing on sports programming and audience is adults age 18–30.

Moji was an official broadcaster of the 2022 FIFA World Cup, along with SCTV, Indosiar and Mentari TV. In August 2022, O Channel replaced their digital on-screen graphic with an #OCPamit countdown, signaling the channel's rebranding.

The channel's content includes live sports, known as Si Jago Voli TV, often broadcasting international, regional, and local volleyball tournaments. English Premier League, Liga 2 Indonesia, and other sports are also featured.

Moji alongside SCTV were official broadcasters for the 2024 Summer Olympics, with Moji mostly airing volleyball events.

== Presenters ==
- Beverly Gunawan (former SCTV anchor)
- Ahmad Rusydi Maulana
- Dana Paramita Notodirdjo (also an news anchor and reporter at SCTV)
- Annura Biometa
- Shahnaz Aprilia
- Eduard Vidyadi
- Hannisa Sandi
- Verta Arlinsa

== Logos ==
Logo of O Channel from 2004 until 2022; the logo was last used on-air alongside the Moji logo after the opening ceremony of the 2022 FIFA World Cup.
