= DANA (payment service) =

Indonesian financial service

PT Espay Debit Indonesia Koe
- Trade name: DANA
- Industry: Information technology
- Founded: December 5, 2018
- Founders: Vincent Iswara
- Headquarters: Capital Place Lantai 18, Jl. Gatot Subroto RT.6/RW.1, Kuningan Barat, Mampang Prapatan, South Jakarta, Indonesia
- Key people: Vincent Iswara
- Owner: Sinar Mas Multiartha
- Number of employees: > 800 employees
- Website: dana.id

DANA is a digital financial service based in Jakarta, Indonesia, which acts as a digital payment to replace conventional wallets. Founded in 2018, DANA is a digital wallet registered with Bank Indonesia with four licenses including electronic money, digital wallet, money transfer, and digital financial liquidity.

== History ==
Vincent Iswara launched DANA on 11 November 2018. Dana began in 2018 as an app offering payments, loyalty points and financial services powered by KMK Online's digital arm. DANA received permission to operate as a fintech company throughout Indonesia on December 5, 2018. With DANA, users can carry out transactions such as bill payments, top up games online, credit, or DANA Paylater, transactions using barcode scanning, and e-commerce. DANA is an official digital payment platform which is directly supervised by Bank Indonesia, it carries an open platform and can be used in various applications, online and conventional outlets.

DANA was developed by the company startup which is an Indonesian legal entity. The main investor of the Fund is PT Elang Sejahtera Mandiri with an ownership portion of 99 percent. Elang Sejahtera Mandiri is a subsidiary of Emtek. Emtek has a collaboration with Ant Financial. With the collaboration between Emtek and Ant Financial, DANA received technological support from Ant Financial. Alipay technology has received recognition in terms of security and reliability in the world of digital transactions. DANA has collaborations with national banks, such as Bank Mandiri, BCA and BRI. DANA was developed as a wallet for storing limited amounts of funds in accordance with Bank Indonesia regulations and security standards.

Since launching the product on November 11, 2018, until the end of June 2019, DANA has had 20 million users, and reached 1.5 million transactions per day.

In August 2021, rumors circulated stating that Sinar Mas would buy 100% of Dana's shares. However, this rumor has appeared several times, even though it was finally quite close to the entry of two Sinarmas Group companies, Bank Sinarmas and Dian Swastatika Sentosa, which Sinarmas denied was just an ordinary investment. With the entry of this funding, the Sinarmas Group is expected to become the largest shareholder, leaving Kreatif Media Karya (EMTEK) with 100% ownership.
