= Bukalapak =

Indonesian technology company

PT Bukalapak.com Tbk
- Trade name: Bukalapak
- Type: Public company (Perseroan terbatas)
- Traded as: IDX: BUKA
- ISIN: ID1000162001
- Industry: Technology
- Founded: 10 January 2010; 16 years ago
- Founders: Achmad Zaky; Fajrin Rasyid; Nugroho Herucahyono
- Headquarters: Jakarta, Indonesia
- Key people: Willix Halim (CEO); Natalia Firmansyah (CFO); Victor Lesmana (director/CEO BukaFinancial); Howard Gani (director/CEO Buka Mitra Indonesia)
- Revenue: ▲ Rp1,9 triliun (2021)
- Number of employees: ▲2.962 (2022)
- Subsidiaries: PT Buka Mitra Indonesia; PT Buka Investasi Bersama; PT Buka Pengadaan Indonesia; PT Five Jack; IPrice Group
- Website: bukalapak.com

PT Bukalapak.com Tbk, trading as Bukalapak, is an Indonesian e-commerce company. It was founded in 2010 as an online marketplace to facilitate online commerce for small and medium enterprises (SME). Bukalapak later expanded to digitise small family-owned businesses, known in Indonesia as warungs. The company is involved in the operations of approximately 25% of Indonesian warungs through its Mitra programme.

As of 2021, Bukalapak serves over 100 million users and seven million partners, and processes an average of over two million daily transactions. It is one of the largest e-commerce companies in Indonesia and is its fourth startup to become a unicorn. Its initial public offering (IPO) on the Indonesian Stock Exchange was the largest ever at the time, in 2021, when it raised up to US$1.5 billion, though it lost nearly 66% of its market value six months later.

== History ==
Former logo of Bukalapak, used from 2016 until 23 March 2020.

Bukalapak was co-founded in 2010 by Achmad Zaky after he graduated from the Bandung Institute of Technology, together with his friend Nugroho Herucahyono. Bukalapak means "open a market stall" in Indonesian. Zaky's friend, Fajrin Rasyid, joined the duo to manage Bukalapak's finances. The premise of Bukalapak was simple—to digitise transactions for small businesses.

Bukalapak's early phase of development coincided with the popularity of fixie bikes, when many sellers in the community sold various types of bikes and biking accessories. Bukalapak focused on working with these sellers, which led to it being known as a marketplace for bikes at one point. It also contributed to the growth of its user base. The term "pelapak" is commonly used to describe the sellers working with Bukalapak. By 2013, the company recorded an average of IDR 500 million in daily transactions, and was working with more than 80,000 sellers.

In December 2019, Zaky announced his plan to resign, and officially resigned in January 2020, appointing Rachmat Kaimuddin as Bukalapak's new CEO. Herucahyono also resigned as CTO, later starting a venture fund for early-stage startups with Zaky. Rasjid departed in June 2020 to join Telkom Indonesia.

The departure of Bukalapak's entire co-founding team coincided with the laying off of employees. Hundreds of employees from its smart retail, internet of things, and marketing divisions were retrenched as part of a change in strategy. Kaimuddin is credited with recruiting blue chip venture capitalists and for leading the company's IPO in August 2021, which was the largest in Indonesia to date. He resigned four months later after be appointed as Technology and Sustainability Development Special Advisor Deputy at Coordinating Ministry for Maritime and Investments Affairs. Bukalapak's COO, Willix Halim took over as CEO.

== Products ==
Bukalapak has undergone significant development from initially just a marketplace platform to an all-commerce platform serving both online and offline markets. Serving approximately 130 million users and 16.8 million MSME partners, the company has become one of the major players in e-commerce in Indonesia.

In general, Bukalapak's business lines consist of marketplace, online to offline (O2O), business to business (B2B), financial, and logistics. Bukalapak's marketplace provides various types of products, both physical and virtual, covering various categories such as gadgets, hobbies, fashion, daily necessities, and games. Additionally, there are financial services offered including insurance, loan financing, investment in mutual funds and gold, as well as digital banking.

Bukalapak's O2O business, referred to as Bukalapak Partners, enables communities to sell various physical and virtual products alongside basic financial services aimed at individuals without access to banking services (such as money transfers, bill payments, and investments). According to a study conducted by Nielsen in 2022, Bukalapak leads digital penetration among small shops in Indonesia with a percentage reaching 56%.

Furthermore, Bukalapak's financial business includes BMoney and Bukatabungan. BMoney is an online investment application owned by Buka Investasi Bersama. BMoney users can engage in stock trading transactions of various issuers in Indonesia. Since its launch in 2020, BMoney has served nearly 1 million investors with total assets under management reaching more than Rp1 trillion. On the other hand, Bukatabungan is a digital banking application introduced by Bukalapak in collaboration with Standard Chartered, a British-based multinational financial services company.

In the logistics business, Bukalapak launched BukaSend in 2019. BukaSend allows Bukalapak partners to become shipping agents. This service is accessed through the Bukalapak application and can be used to send packages without the need to visit an agent. Since 2020, Bukalapak has also introduced BukaGudang, a fulfillment service aimed at helping merchants manage their operational activities through warehouse management and storage, packing goods, and distributing items to third parties.

== Shift to Virtual Products ==
In March 2025, Bukalapak announced that it would discontinue the sale of physical products and shift its focus to virtual goods and services. This strategic move aligns with the company’s vision of enhancing its digital ecosystem, which includes vouchers, gaming credits, and financial services.

== Finance ==
Following a shaky start, Bukalapak secured funding in June 2011 to keep its operations running, when Japanese venture capitalist Takeshi Ebihara from Batavia Incubator invested IDR 2 billion in the company. Ebihara was a mentor of the co-founders.

In February 2014, Indonesian conglomerate Emtek participated in Bukalapak's Series A round, investing for a stake that was less than 20%. Emtek's financial statements in 2015 indicated that Bukalapak received funds from Emtek totalling up to IDR 439 billion. As of July 2020, Emtek holds 35.17% of the company's shares after adjustments—the largest stake among the shareholders. Bukalapak also received investments from Aucfan, IREP, 500 Startups, and GREE Ventures.

In January 2019, Bukalapak announced the completion of an undisclosed funding round by Mirae-Asset-Naver Asia Growth Fund, a joint venture between South Korean companies Mirae Financial Group and Naver. In November 2020, Microsoft invested US$100 million in Bukalapak as part of a deal that would see the latter adopt Microsoft Azure as its preferred cloud platform.

By June 2022, two-third of Bukalapak's revenue originated from partner companies, with the remaining third from e-commerce. That month, it also announced that losses were expected to exceed US$100 million for the fiscal year, though revenue is expected to rise by over 60%.

== Leadership ==
| Role | Appointed |
|---|---|
| CEO | Willix Halim |
| CFO | Natalia Firmansyah |
| Director | Victor Lesmana |

== Awards ==
- Fortune's Change the World 2022 – Fortune
- Glints Best Employers Award 2022 – Glints
- Best Company to Work For 2022 – HR Asia Awards
- Alibaba Cloud Awards 2022 – Alibaba Cloud
- Best Company to Work For 2021 – HR Asia Awards
- UN Women 2020 Asia-Pacific Women Empowerment Principles (WEPs) Awards – Gender Responsive Marketplace – UN Women
- Best Company to Work For 2020 – HR Asia Awards
- Perusahaan dengan Tingkat Pertumbuhan Tertinggi ke-14 di Asia Pasifik dan ke-2 di Indonesia 2020
- CNBC Indonesia Award 2019 – The Best E-Commerce 2019 – CNBC Indonesia
- Best Company to Work For 2019 – HR Asia Awards
- The Best Contact Center Indonesia 2019 – Indonesia Contact Center Association
- Penghargaan Achmad Bakrie XVI 2018 – Teknologi dan Kewirausahaan
- Youtube Pulse 2018 – Best Ads – Nego Cincai
- The Best Contact Center Indonesia 2018 – Indonesia Contact Center Association
- Citra Pariwara 2017 – Bronze – Digital Viral and Email Marketing
- Citra Pariwara 2017 – Silver – Digital Integrated Campaign
- Tangrams Awards – E-Commerce Asia Pacific
- PR Awards Marketing Magazine Southeast Asia 2017 – Best PR-led Integrated Communications & Best Direct-to-Consumer PR Campaign
- PR Indonesia Awards 2017 – Bronze – Program PR Sub Kategori Digital PR
- Millward Brown – Top 50 Most Valuable Indonesia Brands 2016

== See also ==
- List of unicorn startup companies
