= Emtek =

Indonesian technology, communication and media conglomerate

PT Elang Mahkota Teknologi Tbk
- Logo used since 2009

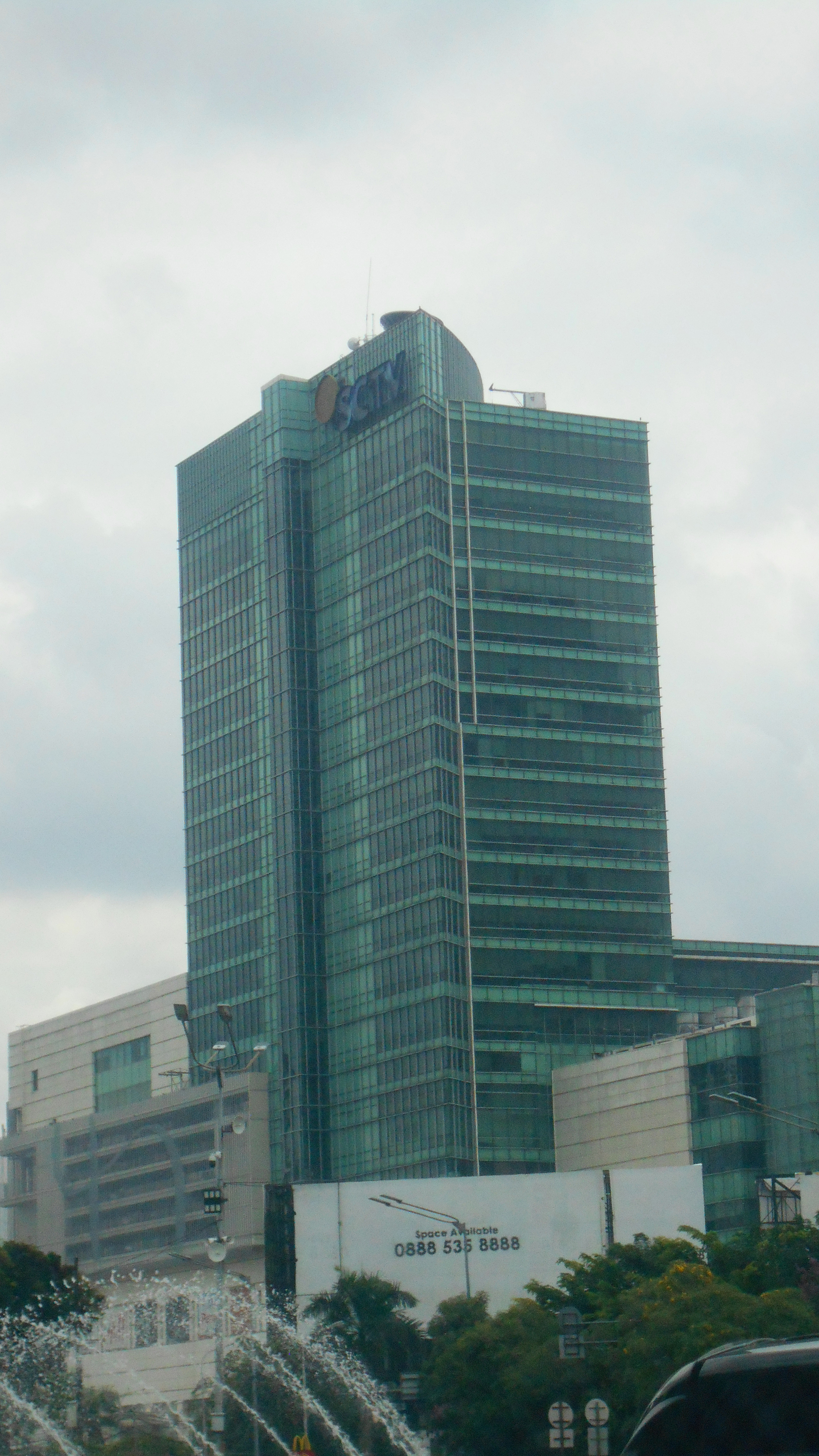
- SCTV Tower in Senayan, Jakarta
- Trade name: Emtek
- Formerly: PT Elang Mahkota Komputer (1983–1997)
- Type: Public
- Traded as: IDX: EMTK
- Industry: Technology; Mass media; Telecommunications
- Founded: 1983; 43 years ago
- Founder: Eddy Kusnadi Sariaatmadja
- Headquarters: Jakarta, Indonesia
- Key people: Alvin Widarta Sariaatmadja (President director)
- Products: Digital television; Network security; Film production; Television production; Pay television; News agency
- Services: Digital media; Software; Online advertising; Online services
- Revenue: ▲ Rp 12.498 trillion (2024)
- Net income: ▲ Rp 69.398 billion (2024)
- Total assets: ▲ Rp 54.912 trillion (2024)
- Owners: Eddy Kusnadi Sariaatmadja (21.94%); Salim Group (15.21%: Anthoni Salim 9%; Prima Visualindo 6.21%)
- Number of employees: 10,987 (2024)
- Subsidiaries: Surya Citra Media; Moji; Sarana Meditama Metropolitan (EMC Healthcare) (76.32%); Bukalapak (23.93%); Super Bank Indonesia
- Website: www.emtek.co.id

PT Elang Mahkota Teknologi Tbk, trading as Emtek, is an Indonesian technology, telecommunication and media conglomerate headquartered in Jakarta. As of 2013, it is Indonesia's second largest media company. It is the parent company for subsidiaries which include pay television service Nex Parabola and five television networks – SCTV, Indosiar, Moji, Ajwa TV [id], and Mentari TV [id]. It was established in 1983 by Eddy Kusnadi Sariaatmadja. Currently, the company is headed by Alvin Widarta Sariaatmadja as its president director.

== History ==
The company was established in 1983 as PT Elang Mahkota Komputer by two brothers Eddy Kusnadi Sariaatmadja and Fofo Sariaatmadja as a distributor of Compaq computers. Emtek was trusted by numerous companies and government to supply Compaq computers to their offices. Emtek owned 3 subsidiaries at the time, PT Abhimata Citra Abadi (network), PT Abhimata Persada (software) and PT Intipraja Teknosindo (hardware manufacturing) along with PT Tangara Mitrakom (VSAT) and PT Bitnet Komunikasindo (ISP) later. In 1998, PT Elang Mahkota Komputer renamed itself into PT Elang Mahkota Teknologi.

After the end of the 1997 Asian financial crisis, Emtek expressed interest in entering the mass media industry. In 2000, in partnership with Australian media mogul John Singleton, acquired partial ownership stake of SCTV, a TV network once tied with the Gang of Four by establishing new business unit, Surya Citra Media. Shares of Emtek ownership then keep increasing until 2005 when it become majority owner of SCTV. On 9 August 2004, the company launched a local television station – O Channel, along with the MRA Media Group. In 2007, Emtek took full control of the station. In 2008, the group took control of Surya Citra Media (SCTV). As Emtek focused more on mass media business, it abandoned its computer distribution business after Compaq was merged with HP Inc.

In 2010, Emtek decided to roll its first initial public offering to the Indonesian Stock Exchange by making 10% of its stake public, making it the first company to IPO in the decade. In May 2011, Emtek begin to make a move to acquire 27,24% of Indosiar ownership stake from Salim Group. At the end of the mandatory tender offer, Emtek officially controlled Indosiar with 84.77% shares. In November 2011, Emtek launched a subscription TV operator, named NexMedia. Emtek was an Official Broadcaster of the 2018 Asian Games for the Indonesian Olympic Committee.

Since 2010s Emtek already diversified its business model ranging from various sectors including fintech, banking, and healthcare. Sariaatmadja family established PT Kreatif Media Karya which focused on funding startups, notably ecommerce Bukalapak and digital payment Dana. Emtek also established PT Elang Medika Corpora that focused on its healthcare wing by acquiring numerous hospitals. In 2021, Emtek completed its acquisition of Bank Fama International, signifying their entry into banking industry.
