= Gang of Four (Indonesia) =

Group of businessmen arranged by former Indonesian President Suharto

The Gang of Four (some also call it Empat Serangkai/Sekawan (Four Friends) or Liem Investors) is a trading and industrial partnership between 4 businessmen, namely: Sudono Salim (Liem Sioe Liong), Sutanto Djuhar (Liem Oen Kian), Ibrahim Risjad, and Sudwikatmono (Dwi) that were prominent during the New Order era. This group can be said to be a fairly successful partnership, and has produced large companies such as Bogasari and Indocement. The name Group of Four itself was not officially created by the 4 businessmen themselves, but from the mass media.

== Origins ==
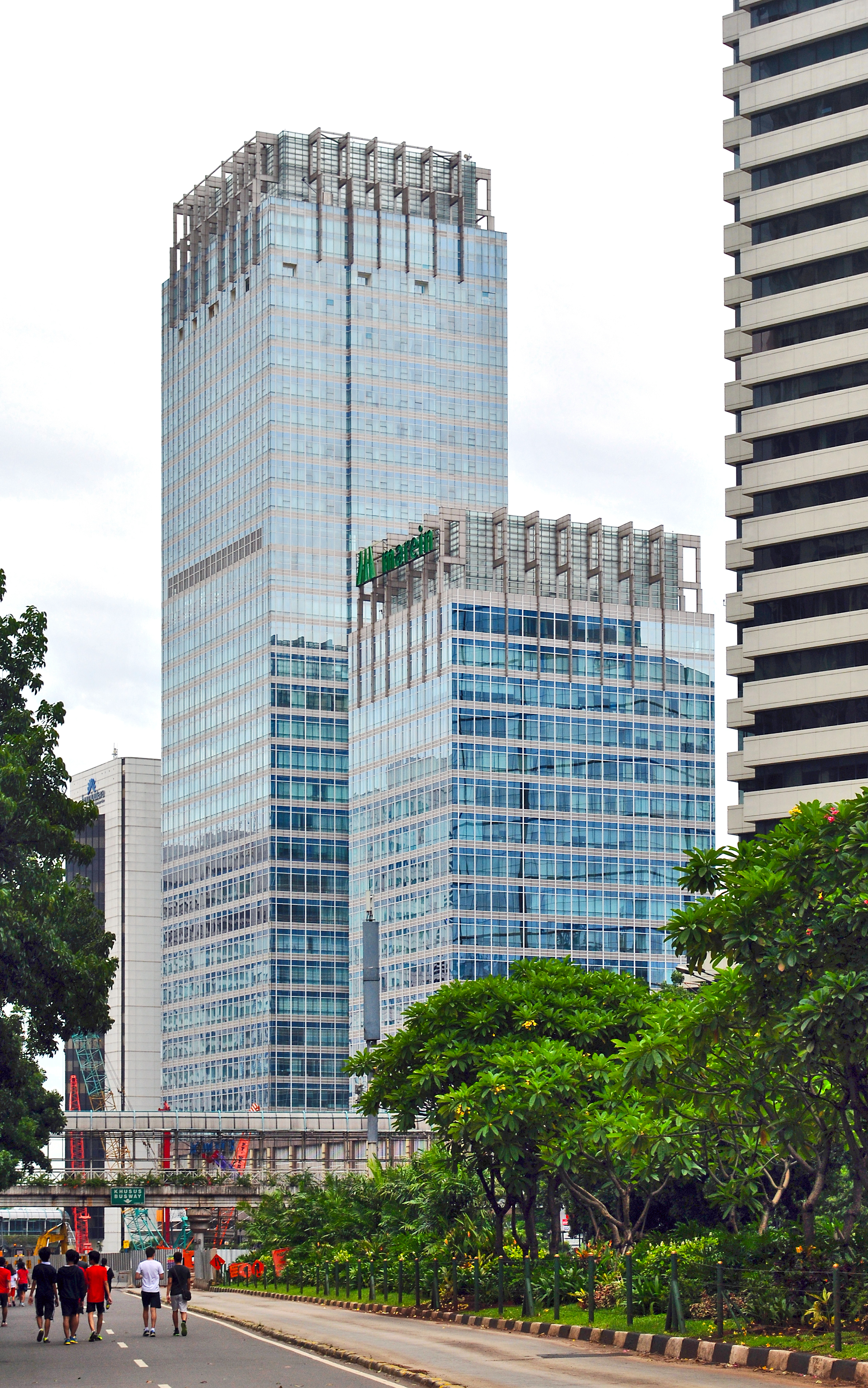
Indocement and Indofood headquarters in Jakarta

The Gang of Four prominence was said to be started by the meeting between Sudono Salim, Sutanto Djuhar, Ibrahim Risjad, and Sudwikatmono in 1960s, few years before Suharto rise to presidency. Salim, who were close to Suharto before his presidency was advised to keep doing business with his partner Djuhar and would introduce his cousin, Sudwikatmono in 1963 as Salim himself stated his need for a native Indonesian as his business partner due to his citizenship status. Aside from Sudwikatmono, Acehnese businessman Ibrahim Risjad also joined the consortium who was previously a acquaintance of both Dwi and Djuhar.

According to Salim on 1994 interview, each members play different roles on building the business empire and represented as pillars. According to former Salim Group employee, Salim and Djuhar are the main foundation of the group with Risjad who does the lobbying and harmonising the group while Dwi was the one who penetrated the bureaucracy as he was said to have a good relations with then minister Soemitro Djojohadikusumo. Initially Salim and Djuhar held 40% of the shares while Dwi and Risjad held 10% of the shares.

== New Order Era ==
In 1968, a year after Suharto named President of Indonesia, Djuhar, Dwi, Risjad, and Salim who were previously arranged into a meeting by Suharto before his presidency formed PT Waringin Kentjana after being acquired due to financial difficulties and upgraded from Kommanditgesellschaft to Naamloze vennootschap and continued its operation exporting coffee, pepper, rubber, tallow nut, and copra and also importing sugar and rice. PT Waringin once own a rubber plantations in Jambi and Palembang. As their business grow, they were given a quota, facilities, and credits from state-owned banks which would later cease to be delivered after negative receptions from public.

In 1970s, the group formed PT Bogasari Flour Mills in 1971 and PT Distinct Indonesia Cement Enterprise (now Indocement) in 1975. Under the partnership with Malaysian businessman Robert Kuok, Bogasari opened 2 factories in Indonesia's 2 main cities, Jakarta and Surabaya. Until the end of Suharto presidency, Bogasari has monopolised the flour market and grain processing facilities in the country and Indocement would take the lead in the country's cement industry and formed 5 spin-off companies: PT Perkasa Indonesia Cement Enterprise (PICE), PT Perkasa Indah Indonesia Cement Putih Enterprise (PIICPE), PT Perkasa Agung Utama Indonesia Cement Enterprise (PAUICE), PT Perkasa Inti Abadi Indonesia Cement Enterprise (PIAICE), dan PT Perkasa Abadi Mulia Indonesia Cement Enterprise. Due to Suharto's aid involvement with their businesses, the company was mandated to transfer 26% of its profit to the foundations formed by Suharto as a payment to capital, facilities, and incentives support The group would later expand their businesses to property sector. In late 1970s, in partnership with property businessman Ciputra and Japanese conglomerate Marubeni, the group formed Metropolitan Kentjana to develop a former rubber plantation in South Jakarta and name it Pondok Indah

In 1980s, Salim would expand his business to Hong Kong by forming First Pacific, an investment management and holding company with Filipino businessman Manny Pangilinan. The four would later go on their separate ways while still tied to partnership during that era to form a new company. Salim formed Bank Central Asia with Lippo Group founder Mochtar Riady and acquired Indomobil from businessman Atang Latif. Djuhar returned to his hometown Fuqing to expand his business in China and Singapore after Chinese paramount leader Deng Xiaoping enacted Reform and Opening policies and established Rongqiao Group there. Dwi would later form Subentra Group along with other businessmen Harris Lasmana and Benny Suherman that initially focused on Chinese film import but would later form a cinema chain 21 Cineplex and acquiring franchising rights of Planet Hollywood restaurant chain to operate in Indonesia, and Dwi Golden Graha that focused on retail. Risjad formed his own company Risjadson that focused on financial services. Salim considered splitting the companies to reduce redundancy while Dwi, Risjad, and Djuhar families remain in top position and majority stakeholders within Salim Group.

Toward the end of 1980s and early to mid 1990s, Salim Group would expand its property investment by establishing BSD City with Ciputra who he previously partnered in developing Pondok Indah and Sinar Mas Land, owned by Eka Tjipta Widjaja in Serpong, developing Pantai Indah Kapuk and Puri Indah. This era also marked the first Initial public offering of Indocement that was done in 1989 and later Indofood in 1994 after changing its name to the Indonesian Stock Exchange. The gang also expanded its venture into mass media, Salim established his own TV channel Indosiar after Indonesian government allowed private owned television broadcasting company and partnering Hong Kong Television Broadcasts Limited (TVB) and Semarang regional newspaper company Suara Merdeka while Dwi established Indika Group with unit consist of its early production house Indika Entertainment and TV channel SCTV which he founded with Djuhar's cousin Henry Pribadi.

== Fall of Suharto and decline ==
Rioters burned the image of Sudono Salim and his wife after his family home were looted during the May 1998 riots of Indonesia

The decline of gang influence was prompted by the 1997 Asian financial crisis which affected the businesses of the group except for Djuhar who still have businesses in China and Singapore. The decline was prompted due to amount of debt owed by the group to local and international creditors and weakening of rupiah which mark the end of the partnership between the four. As a result, the companies was forced to restructure in order to survive. Salim handed the Salim Group leadership to his son Anthoni and fled to Singapore after his private residence was looted during the May 1998 riot. Djuhar handed his leadership to his son Teddy and never returned to Indonesia. Dwi handed his business to his children, Agus Lasmono and Martina. The decline of the gang also saw Risjadson and Salim to shut down or hand over their companies to Indonesian Bank Restructuring Agency (IBRA). As a result, Salim lost Bank Central Asia to Djarum, Indocement to Heidelberg Materials, and Metropolitan Kentjana to Central Cipta Murdaya. While Bank Risjad Salim Internasional owned by Risjad was also taken over by IBRA and merged with 7 other banks to form Bank Danamon. Dwi also handed several of his assets to IBRA and handed his 21 Cineplex chain to his business partners Benny Suherman and Harris Lasmana. Both Salim and Dwi also lost their media wings with both Indosiar and SCTV acquired by Emtek partnered with Australian media mogul John Singleton after the crisis.

After the end of the crisis, there were several reports that the relationship between Salim and Djuhar has been deteriorated with both Salim and Djuhar families has sued each other in 2002. However, Salim son-in-law Franciscus Welirang denied the rift between two. In 2004, IBRA has stated that Dwi, Risjad, and Salim has paid all their debt to Liquidity Aid of Bank Indonesia. Even though the gang has broken their business ties, the heir of the gang still hold shares in some of their companies such as Indocement which Salim Group still hold 13% of shares, Bank Central Asia with 0.69%, and Emtek with 9%.

As of 2018, all the original members of the Gang of Four had died with first being Sudwikatmono who died in Singapore on 2011. Both Ibrahim Risjad and Sudono Salim also died in Singapore in the same year, 2012. In 2018, the last surviving member of the gang Sutanto Djuhar died in his hometown in Fuqing, China.

== See also ==
- First Pacific
- Salim Group
- Bamboo network
- Nine Dragons (Indonesia), the successor to the Gang of Four
- Cronies of Ferdinand Marcos, Filipino equivalent
