= Gardenia Foods =

Asian food manufacturing company

Gardenia
- Traded as: SGX: Q01
- Industry: Manufacturing
- Founded: 1978; 48 years ago
- Founder: Horatio Sye Slocumm; Wong Tze Fatt
- Headquarters: Singapore
- Area served: Asia-Pacific
- Products: Breads; Pocket sandwich Snack; Cakes; Toasts
- Parent: QAF Limited (First Pacific).
- Website: www.gardenia.com.sg

Gardenia Foods (S) Pte Ltd. (also known as Gardenia Bakeries or Gardenia) is a Singaporean baked-goods company with presence in Singapore, Brunei, Indonesia, Malaysia and the Philippines. It is listed on the Singapore Exchange (SGX) via its parent company, QAF Limited, which also owns Bonjour Bakery, and are headquartered at the Chinatown Complex in South Bridge Road.

The earlier version of the Gardenia company was established by Horatio Sye Slocumm, an American who was an employee of International Executive Service Corps and worked with bakeries based in the United States, together with Wong Tze Fatt, a Malaysian businessman born in Sabah. It initially operated within the state of Sabah and later expanded to Peninsular Malaysia.

== History ==
Wong Tze Fatt was an entrepreneur and had took over his father's coffee shop, which later evolved into a supermarket in Sabah. As he was expanding his business, he ventured into baking and in-flight catering. To cope with the growing demands, he consulted Trade Consul at the United States Embassy in Singapore to kick-start Gardenia Brand Wholesale Bakery in Kota Kinabalu where he met Horatio Sye Slocumm by 1970.

Later in 1981, Wong had collaborated with PepsiCo International to introduce canned soft drinks in East Malaysia as a franchisee under Gardenia Beverage Sdn. Bhd. Gardenia also produced ice creams and creameries, and carried out its in-flight catering services through their subsidiary, Gardenia Catering Services in Kota Kinabalu International Airport and Brunei International Airport. Their bakery business later expanded to Singapore, Republic of Indonesia, and Brunei Darussalam.

Gardenia started out as a store bakery in Singapore, but due to demand opened a commercial bakery at Pandan Loop in March 1983. This was followed by a second bakery in June 1993.

In 1984, Wong sold all his shares to QAF Limited, which since then oversee Gardenia's operation in Singapore and later in Peninsular Malaysia through its subsidiary Gardenia Bakeries (KL) Sdn. Bhd. However, Gardenia's operation in Sabah is still managed by Wong up until his murder on 9th December 2004. Operation of Gardenia in Sabah remained separated from the mainstream operations based in both Singapore and Peninsular Malaysia as emphasized in a statement by Gardenia Bakeries (KL) Sdn. Bhd.

In 2019, Gardenia stated that its products would be in compliance with the Government of Singapore ban via the Ministry of Health in accordance with the Health Promotion Board (HPB) on hydrogenated oils (PHOs), a major source of artificial trans fat. It also added that all of their products at the time were already PHO-free since the early 2000s prior to the ban, which came into effect in June 2021.

On 20 May 2026, Gardenia Foods announced that it would shift its bakery production from Singapore to Johor Bahru, Malaysia. The move would result in the retrenchment of 141 employees at the company’s Pandan Loop manufacturing facility, where production is scheduled to cease on 30 June 2026. Gardenia said Singapore would remain its central hub for brand management, product development, quality and regulatory oversight, distribution and supply chain operations, with about 250 employees remaining in Singapore after the transition.

== Operations in other countries ==
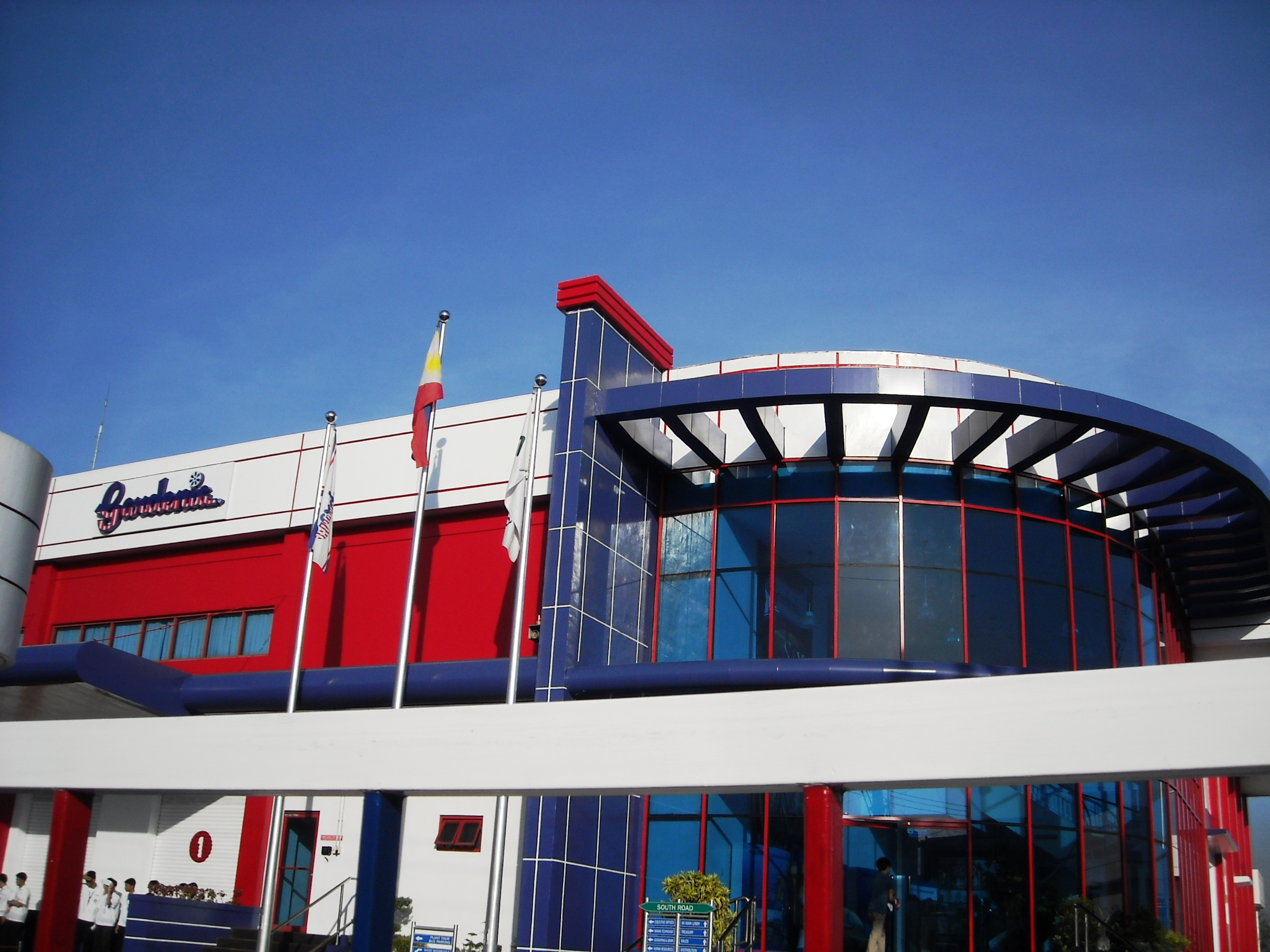
Gardenia Center in Biñan, Laguna

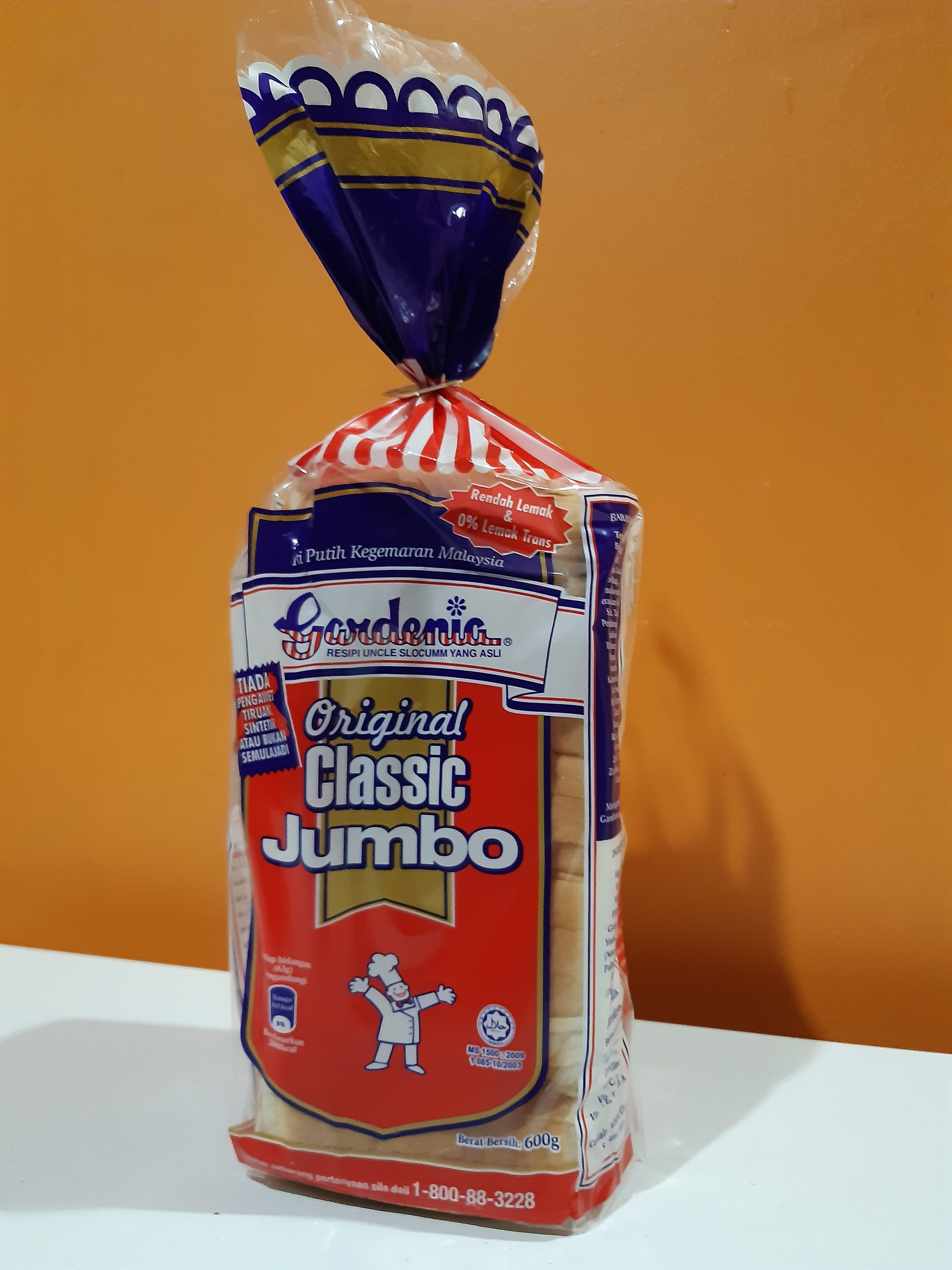
Gardenia Original Classic Jumbo released for the Malaysia market.

Gardenia's operations outside of Singapore is managed by separate subsidiary companies: Gardenia Bakeries (KL) Sdn Bhd (GBKL) in Peninsular Malaysia, which, from 2017, has stakes that are 50% owned by Malaysian rice company Padiberas Nasional Berhad Gardenia Bakeries Philippines, Inc. in the Philippines, and Gardenia Food Industries Sdn Bhd in Brunei. Production in the particular Malaysian states of Sabah and Sarawak plus the Indonesian Kalimantan region is licensed to Kim Teck Cheong Consolidated since 2020; which uses different recipes to products sold in the Peninsula under GBKL.

In 2013, they also expanded to the Indonesian market outside Kalimantan under PT Gardenia Makmur Selaras in Bogor. According to the 2015 annual report of QAF Limited, Andree Halim is the largest shareholder in the Singapore listed bakery firm, which owns the biggest market share in packaged bread in Singapore, Indonesia, Malaysia and the Philippines. Andree is the son of the late Indonesian business tycoon Sudono Salim Liem Sioe Liong, the founder of Salim Group. Lin Kejian, meanwhile, is the son of Andree Halim, essentially the substantial owners of QAF are related to Salim Group. Indomarco Prismatama, a 40% owned unit of PT Indoritel Makmur Internasional Tbk, is the main distributor of PT Gardenia Makmur Selaras in Indonesia, which distributes the bread through Indomaret under the brand name “Prime Bread”.

Gardenia Food Industries has been operating in Brunei since 1972, and is currently the country's top manufacturer and wholesale dealer of bread, buns, cakes and pastries.

Gardenia entered the Philippine market in 1997. Its main bread-manufacturing facility in the country is located in Laguna. It operates at least three other facilities: in Mabalacat (Pampanga), Cagayan de Oro and Cebu. Vitabread Food Products Inc. is responsible for the manufacturing of Gardenia products for the Luzon market.

By late 2017, Gardenia have expanded its operations to the Asian market in Singapore, Brunei, Indonesia, Malaysia, the Philippines, Australia and China.
