= Indosiar =

Indonesian free-to-air television network

- Logo since 1 December 2014, based on the 1995 logo, which was based on the TVB logo
- Type: Television broadcaster
- Country: Indonesia
- Broadcast area: Nationwide
- Affiliates: Sin Po TV (2023–present)
- Headquarters: SCTV Tower, Senayan City, Jl. Asia Afrika Lot 19, Tanah Abang, Central Jakarta

Programming
- Language: Indonesian
- Picture format: 1080i HDTV (downscaled to 16:9 576i for the SDTV feed)

Ownership
- Owner: Salim Group (1994–2001); Indosiar Karya Media (2001–2013); Emtek Media (2013–present)
- Parent: Emtek
- Sister channels: SCTV (2011–present); Moji (2011–present); Ajwa TV (2020–present); Mentari TV (2021–present); Elshinta TV (2005–2013)

History
- Founded: 19 July 1991
- Launched: 18 December 1994 (trial broadcast); 11 January 1995; 31 years ago (official broadcast)
- Founder: Sudono Salim; Anthony Salim; Eko Supardjo Rustam
- Replaced: MCTI (1991–1994); RIT TV (1991–1994)

Links
- Website: www.indosiar.com

Availability

Terrestrial
- Digital Greater Jakarta: 24 (UHF); Channel 24
- Digital Regional branches: Check local frequencies (in Indonesian)

Streaming media
- Vidio: Watch live (subscription required outside Indonesia)
- IndiHome TV: Watch live (IndiHome customers only)

PT Indosiar Visual Mandiri, commonly known as Indosiar, is an Indonesian over-the-air television broadcaster, established on 19 July 1991 with an official launch on 11 January 1995. It has been owned by Emtek since 2011, and operated under Emtek's subsidiary, Surya Citra Media (SCM; owner of SCTV) since May 2013, with the network's original owner, Indosiar Karya Media, absorbed into SCM. The name Indosiar is derived from two words, namely Indonesia and siar, which comes from the Indonesian word siaran, meaning 'broadcasting'.

In September 2008 it reported an audience share of 16.2% of viewers, which shrank to 11.6% in December 2009. Indosiar broadcasts Indonesian association football matches such as BRI Liga 1 games, and the Indonesia President's Cup, as well as other world sports broadcasts.

Indosiar currently uses 16:9 as the main aspect ratio for both HD and SD TV, replacing 4:3 for SDTV from 30 November 2021 and following the launch of an HDTV service in May 2017. The network also has had DVB-T2 nationwide broadcast feeds on an encrypted-transponder using the Telkom-4 satellite since 2021.

Its broadcast tower, the 395 m (1,296 ft) tall Indosiar Television Tower, located in West Jakarta, is the tallest structure in Indonesia.

== History ==
Salim Group's interest in the broadcasting industry began when the Indonesian government issued a permit for RCTI to be established as the first commercial TV broadcaster in Indonesia in 1989.

A joint venture between Salim Group and the Semarang newspaper Suara Merdeka was created to build a local TV station, under the name Merdeka Citra Televisi Indonesia (MCTI). The establishment permit for MCTI was issued on 21 August 1991, with 60% of the shares controlled by Salim and 40% by Suara Merdeka. Salim then collaborated with Television Broadcasts Limited (TVB) of Hong Kong which was placed at the MCTI head office in Semarang. In addition, Salim also planned to build another TV station in Batam, in collaboration with the Ramako Group (owned by Bambang Nuryatno Rachmadi) called Ramako Indotelevisi (RIT TV). The establishment of two local TV stations was due to government regulations at the time only allowing one commercial TV station in each region.

However, Salim later decided to change its approach by establishing a national private TV station. During lobbying efforts in Europe, Anthony Salim proposed the creation of a TV network focused on economic issues, particularly rural economics, in discussions with President Soeharto. At the same time, another proposal emerged from Eko Supardjo Rustam (the son of former Central Java Governor Soepardjo Rustam) and the Minister of Home Affairs. They envisioned a TV station based in Central Java that would highlight Javanese culture. Soeharto ultimately decided to merge both ideas into a single company, PT Indosiar Visual Mandiri. The station was designed to broadcast programs centered on rural economics and cultural themes. It was officially established on 19 July 1991 and received its broadcasting licence on 18 June 1992.

Because it was assigned the specific purpose of broadcasting rural cultural and economic programs, Indosiar initially had the status of an SPTSK (Stasiun Penyiaran Televisi Swasta Khusus) or Special Private Television Broadcasting Station. This status allowed it to broadcast nationally, unlike other private TV stations which were only allowed to broadcast locally. On 30 January 1993 and before broadcasts officially commenced, Indosiar and the other four private TV stations at the time (RCTI, SCTV, TPI and ANTV) were allowed to broadcast with a different status: SPTSU (Stasiun Penyiaran Televisi Swasta Umum), or General Private Television Broadcasting Station. For the TV stations (other than TPI), this status allowed them to broadcast nationally. For Indosiar, it freed the network from the obligation to air specific programs tied to its SPTSK status and this flexibility enabled the network to focus on entertainment programming from the beginning of its broadcasts.

Building on the cooperation established during the initial planning phase with MCTI, Indosiar formed a partnership with Hong Kong-based TVB. The goal was to leverage TVB's expertise to enhance the skills of Indosiar's workforce. TVB was chosen for its cost-efficient operations, strong in-house production capabilities, and a programming style that closely matched Indonesian audience preferences. As part of this collaboration, Indosiar followed TVB's model by constructing four state-of-the-art TV studios for in-house production in Indonesia. Additionally, the network hired 1,000 local employees and brought in 150 foreign workers, many of whom held key positions in production, planning, and direct marketing.

However, the decision to employ 150 foreign workers quickly sparked controversy. Critics argued that it could threaten national culture, especially amid concerns that Indosiar would produce "800 copycats of international television series" or many series that resembled East Asian and Western productions without acknowledging Indonesian culture. The policy was also seen as potentially violating government regulations. In response to these concerns, Indosiar's management decided—one month before its official launch on 18 December 1994—to cut the number of TVB employees to just 30. Over time, the number of foreign workers was further reduced through increased training for local staff, and by 1996, almost no TVB expatriates remained at Indosiar. Some speculated that the backlash stemmed from resentment toward a major non-native businessman successfully entering the broadcasting industry.

The collaboration with TVB influenced Indosiar in several ways, including its logo, which closely resembled TVB's, and its programming lineup, which featured a strong selection of Asian drama series in its early broadcasts. The establishment of Indosiar required an investment of 200 billion rupiah.

=== Launch and early development ===
Indosiar continued its operational plan by conducting trial broadcasts (called pre-premieres) starting on 18 December 1994 (postponed from its initial plan in July and August 1994) at 19:00 to 21:30 WIB (or 22:00/22:30 WIB if there is a TVRI relay) in the areas of Jakarta, Bandung, Semarang, Yogyakarta, Surabaya, Denpasar, Medan, and Ujung Pandang. Its trial broadcasts at that time each day only broadcast a selected independent film and two relayed news broadcasts from TVRI (Berita Malam and Dunia Dalam Berita).

The network officially launched on 11 January 1995. The next day, the first independent film to be premiered on the network was Sesal, directed by Sophan Sophiaan.

Indosiar's broadcasts initially lasted eight hours per day, from 16:00 (later 15:30) to 24:00 WIB. Since 16 June 1997, its broadcasts have started in the morning (except for weekends, when they begin at 06:00). As it launched, Indosiar immediately had various popular entertainment programs, especially Hong Kong dramas, such as the series Return of the Condor Heroes (starring Andy Lau), New Heavenly Sword and Dragon Sabre, and To Liong To (starring Tony Leung) which were quite popular among viewers. Indosiar began using an audio standard known as NICAM, which was intended to provide high-quality sound for television transmission. At that time the network was also equipped with other pieces of newly-standardised technology, such as digital master control, digital tapes, and the network prepared for digital and HDTV broadcasts, long before the start of digital TV in Indonesia.

Between 12 and 20 August 1995, in order to celebrate the Merdeka Day Golden Jubilee, Indosiar broadcast all day, in a program called the "Spectacular Indosiar 24 Hours Nonstop". This was the second time a TV station in Indonesia broadcast for 24 hours on a special occasion, besides RCTI and SCTV, which had done so together for their respective second and first anniversaries on 24 August to 25 August 1991. The two networks fully began broadcasting 24 hours in the early 2000s.

In addition, Indosiar emphasizes cultural programming. One example is a wayang show broadcast on Saturday nights, and the Srimulat comedy, inspired by traditional Indonesian culture but made in a modern style. The broadcast of these programs is a realization of the President's original vision for the network.

However, when the channel first began broadcasting, the programs were 70% imported and 30% locally produced. As its programming evolved, Indosiar introduced Indonesian soap operas in the musical genre (starting with Melangkah Di Atas Awan), as well as romance and family dramas (beginning with Tersanjung). The network also aired quiz shows such as Kuis Siapa Berani? and Family 100. Additionally, Indosiar featured a variety of animated series, including Sailor Moon, Dragon Ball, Digimon, and Chuggington, which were broadcast every Sunday from 06:30 to 12:00.

These programs helped establish Indosiar as a popular TV network in Indonesia, achieving a market share of 34–38% in 1999. By 2002, Indosiar had the highest advertising revenue among its competitors. Between 2004 and 2007, its popularity was further boosted by reality singing competitions such as AFI, StarDut, Mamamia, and others, many of which engaged audiences emotionally and encouraged participation through SMS voting.

In 2005, Indosiar won an Asian Television Award for its special Christmas programming in 2004, including a live Christmas Eve mass from Sendangsono, Yogyakarta and the musical event The Bells: A Christmas Concert, featuring performances by AFI Junior (Samuel, Tata, Albert, and Damai), Christopher Abimanyu, Ruth Sahanaya, and the Choir of Jakarta Cathedral. Additionally, long before TVRI set a record for the largest flag-raising ceremony for Indonesia's Independence Day in August 2020, Indosiar had already organized the previous largest flag-raising event in Southeast Asia, hoisting a massive flag on its transmitter tower in Joglo, West Jakarta.

=== Decline and acquisition by Emtek ===
By the late 2000s, the singing contest programs were no longer attracting many viewers, so Indosiar began to air more FTV drama programs and soap operas produced by Genta Buana Paramita, as well as several programs such as Take Me Out Indonesia. Initially, many of Indosiar's dramas, such as Tutur Tinular Versi 2011 were quite popular, but the network became the subject of gossip on social media, with users considering the drama programs and FTVs produced by Genta Buana to be of low quality, the stories to be historically inaccurate, and the animation effects to be substandard. Indosiar's ratings declined further, possibly leading to the sale of Indosiar from the Salim Group to Emtek in 2011.

Some time after the transfer of ownership and operating under Emtek's management, Indosiar began to make a number of adjustments to its programs. These changes, such as eliminating all serialised soap opera programs (in 2013, but since 2021 they have been returned) and promoting more in-house dangdut reality shows, such as D'Academy and Liga Dangdut Indonesia, Indosiar seems to have become "dangdut channel" and has even produced many new dangdut stars, such as Lesti Kejora and Evi Masamba. Indosiar also often airs non-dangdut reality programs such as Golden Memories, Akademi Sahur Indonesia and Stand Up Comedy Academy. In addition, Indosiar has also increasingly established FTV programs with religious nuances (since 2014) such as Azab, Suara Hati Istri and Pintu Berkah (all produced by Mega Kreasi Films). These programs are quite successful in attracting the lower-class market, but are sometimes criticized by some upper-class people because the core of the story is always monotonous and the details of the story are too far-fetched. During Emtek's tenure, Indosiar has also increasingly broadcast football programs, such as Liga 1, the Indonesian President's Cup, and the 2022 FIFA World Cup in Qatar.

== Identity ==
=== Name ===
The name of 'Indosiar' is a combination of two words, which are indo, referencing Indonesia, and siar, which comes from the word 'siaran' that means 'Broadcasting'. The name was like that of the other companies owned by Grup Salim since the 1990s, such as Indomaret, Indokemika Jayatama, Indofood, and Intikom, in remembrance of their original owner.

=== Logo ===
In the early years, Indosiar used a logo that was similar to that of Television Broadcasts Limited, Hong Kong that was adopted from the cooperation of both companies at the start of their broadcasting. The logo is used with licensing from the children company in the Netherlands known as Condor Entertainment BV through an agreement since 1st of January 1995. The agreement of the two will last until 28th of February 2027, with a fee of 675 thousand USD. There are some modifications that Indosiar put in their logo, such as changing the color palette(TVB used dark blue while Indosiar used light blue), along with the text that says "INDOSIAR"(with a modified version of the Avant Garde font) and three rings with the style of a red O letter known as a concentric circle in the middle of the green color(signifies ownership by Grup Salim)

The first Indosiar logo inspired from the TVB logo and uses the Avant Garde (modified) font.

In the beginning, the logo was used by Indosiar from years 1995-2007, but because after the controversy in which it broke CRT TV due to it always leaving a mark in the top left corner (known as screen burn-in), the logo then changed to a flying fish, though the real logo still stayed as a company logo. Five years later, the company logo came back to be used with minor changes, such as a shining effect (as well as a 'diamond' effect starting from 1 October 2012) and the three circles being changed with a red "O". Modifications were done yet again, becoming the logo that is used since 1 December 2014, which has a change of letter styling for the first time in 20 years from Avant Garde Bold and Nexa Bold, color shading, and a logo shape that looks more boxed. The logo placement changed on the 1 February 2025, making it in the top right corner around the same time as Mentari TV, and matching with the SCTV and Moji TV networks publicly.

== See also ==
- List of television stations in Indonesia
- Moji
- Ajwa TV
