= Sutanto Djuhar =

Chinese-Indonesian businessman (1928–2018)

- Born: March 19, 1928; Fuqing County, Fujian Province, Republic of China
- Died: July 2, 2018 (aged 90); Fuzhou, China
- Other names: Lin Wenjing; Liem Oen Kian; Ling Ung Keng
- Citizenship: Chinese; Indonesian
- Occupations: Co-founder of Salim Group; Founder of Indocement & Indofood
- Children: 5

Sutanto Djuhar (19 March 1928 – 2 July 2018), known as Lin Wenjing (Chinese: 林文镜) in Mandarin pinyin and Liem Oen Kian or Ling Ung Keng in the Fuqing dialect, was an Indonesian businessman, investor, and philanthropist. A native of Fuqing, Fujian, China, he and fellow Fuqing native Sudono Salim (Liem Sie Liong) co-founded the conglomerate Salim Group, which grew into Indonesia's largest company. He founded Indocement and Indofood as part of the Salim Group, and was a major shareholder of Hong Kong–based investment management conglomerate First Pacific. He was the last surviving member of the "Gang of Four", the most powerful Indonesian businessmen of the Suharto era.

In the 1980s, he returned to Fuqing and established Rongqiao Group to focus on the development in his hometown. He built an industrial zone in Fuqing, as well as major infrastructure facilities including the New Fuzhou Port, one of China's top ten container ports, which helped the county's GDP ranking rise from the 68th in Fujian to the second. In 2015, the Hurun Report estimated his net worth to be US$3.9 billion, ranking him as the richest person in Fujian and the 408th richest in the world.

== Early life ==
He was born Lin Wenjing on 19 March 1928, a native of Fuqing County, near Fuzhou, the capital of southeast China's Fujian Province. He was born in Xitou Village (溪头), Fuqing, and moved to Indonesia when he was eight.

== Business career ==
When Djuhar was 17, his father died and he had to quit school to run the family shop, beginning his business career as a small trader. In 1965, he established Huarenyi Limited Company in Jakarta, and he then ventured into many Indonesian industry sectors construction, food, industrial manufacturing, mining, real estate, transportation, and the wholesale-retail trade. In the late 1960s, he became partner with Sudono Salim (Liem Sie Liong). As they were both from Fuqing and from the same clan Lin (Liem), Djuhar referred to Salim, who was 11 years his senior, as his "uncle". They merged their businesses to form the Salim Group, with Salim serving as Chairman and Djuhar as General Manager. Within the Salim Group, Djuhar established Indocement, which for a time was not only the largest cement producer in Indonesia, but in the entire globe as well as Indofood, an Indonesian flour miller and supplier in addition to the beverage and food giant, Indofood, well-known for being Indonesia's largest maker of instant noodles. The Salim Group grew into Indonesia's largest company, and Salim, Djuhar, and two other Salim Group executives, Sudwikatmono and Ibrahim Risjad, became known as the "Gang of Four", the most powerful Indonesian businessmen of the Suharto era.

=== Career in China ===
When China opened up to foreign investment in the Reform and Opening era, Djuhar visited Fuqing County in 1985 and found the place to be destitute and mired in poverty. He divested from the Salim Group and moved back to Fuqing in 1987 to focus on developing his hometown, and established Rongqiao Group (融侨集团) in 1989 to manage his investment. He vowed to create an industrial zone that would produce an annual output of US$500 million within five years, even though the total annual GDP of Fuqing at the time was only 430 million RMB. He not only reached the goal, but the industrial zone continued growing and achieved an annual output of US$5 billion by 2000.

To support the development of industry, Djuhar made major investments in infrastructure. As Fuqing did not have its own port, Djuhar built the ports of Xialong (下垄) and Yuanhong (元洪) in the 1980s. In the 1990s, he built a deep-water port at Jiangyin (江阴), which became one of the top ten container ports in China. It was renamed as New Fuzhou Port in October 2005. After several decades of development, Fuqing's GDP ranking among counties of Fujian rose from the 58th in the 1980s to the second in 2018. In 2005, Fuqing was upgraded from a county to the status of a county-level city.

In 2010, Forbes ranked Djuhar as the 39th richest person in Indonesia, with a net worth of US$490 million. In 2015, the Hurun Report ranked him as the richest person in Fujian and the 408th richest in the world, with a net worth of US$3.9 billion.

== Philanthropy ==
Djuhar was a well known philanthropist. Before his death, his Rongqiao Group had donated more than 1 billion yuan to various causes including education, public facilities, environment, and medical care. He established the Lin Wenjing Foundation in June 2016 to manage his philanthropic endeavours, and it had donated more than 10 million yuan in the two years before his death.

== Personal life ==
Djuhar had five children. His son Teddy Djuhar is a director of the board of First Pacific.

Djuhar died on 2 July 2018 in Fuzhou, China, at the age of 90.
