= Indofood Agri Resources =

Indonesian investment holding company

- Company type: Public
- Traded as: SGX: 5JS
- Revenue: 13,650,388,000,000 rupiah (2019)
- Parent: Indofood Singapore Holdings Pte. Ltd.
- Website: www.indofoodagri.com

Indofood Agri Resources Ltd. (shortened as IndoAgri) is an investment holding company and a subsidiary of Indofood Singapore Holdings Pte. Ltd.. Through Anthoni Salim's First Pacific and Indofood, he owns 74% of the company's voting rights. The company is listed on Singapore Exchange (ticker: 5JS) and the Frankfurt Stock Exchange (ticker: ZVF).

== Operations ==
IndoAgri operates in Indonesia, Brazil and the Philippines.

== Controversy ==
In 2019, IndoAgri quit its membership from the Roundtable on Sustainable Palm Oil after it had struggled with the RSPO complaints. According to Chain Reaction Research, 42% of IndoAgri's landbank is contested, community conflicts are happening on several plantations have and some land is within protected nature area.
