= Bamboo network =

Overseas Chinese community network

- Countries and territories: Brunei; Cambodia; Indonesia; Laos; Malaysia; Myanmar; Philippines; Singapore; Thailand; Vietnam
- Languages and language families: Chinese, English, Burmese, Filipino, Indonesian, Khmer, Laotian, Malay, Thai, Vietnamese and many others
- Major cities: (Brunei) Bandar Seri Begawan (Thailand) Bangkok (Vietnam) Ho Chi Minh City (Indonesia) Jakarta (Malaysia) Kuala Lumpur (Myanmar) Mandalay (Philippines) Manila (Cambodia) Phnom Penh; Singapore (Laos) Vientiane

The bamboo network (simplified Chinese: 竹网; traditional Chinese: 竹網; pinyin: zhú wǎng) or the Chinese Commonwealth is a term used to conceptualize the links between businesses run by overseas Chinese in Southeast Asia (in a narrower sense with the Min Chinese speaking community). It links the overseas Chinese business community of Southeast Asia, namely Malaysia, Indonesia, Singapore, Thailand, Vietnam, the Philippines, Myanmar, Brunei, Laos and Cambodia with the economies of Greater China (mainland China, Hong Kong, Macau, and Taiwan). Overseas Chinese companies in Southeast Asia are usually managed as family businesses in a centralized bureaucratic manner.

== Structure ==
Overseas Chinese businesses in Southeast Asia are usually family owned and managed through a centralized bureaucracy. The businesses are usually managed as family businesses to lower front office transaction costs as they are passed down from one generation to the next. The bulk of these firms typically operate as small and medium-sized businesses.

Bamboo networks are also transnational, which means channeling the movement of capital, information, and goods and services can promote the relative flexibility and efficiency between the formal agreements and transactions made by family-run firms. Business relationships are based on the Confucian paradigm of guanxi, the Chinese term for the cultivation of personal relationships as an ingredient for business success.

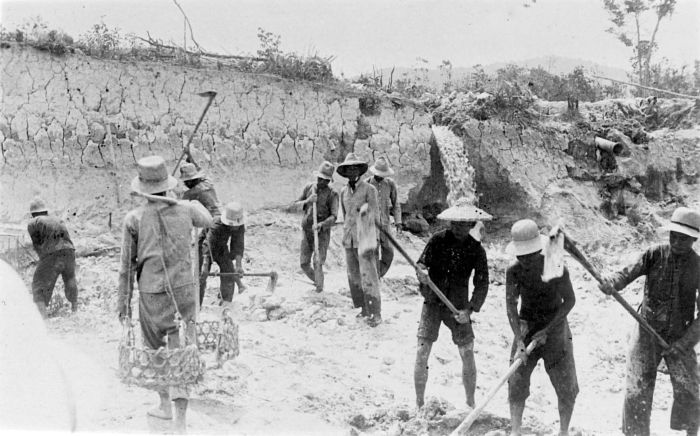
Large numbers of Chinese male immigrants labored in rubber plantations and tin mines of Indonesia, Malaysia, and Thailand while others set up small provision shops to eke out a living for themselves.

Some overseas Chinese businessmen include Malaysian dealmaker Robert Kuok, Indonesian banker and retail proprietor Liem Sioe Liong, and his son, financier and money manager Liem Hong Sien in addition to fellow Fuqing native and Salim Group co-founder and investor Liem Oen Kian, Filipino billionaire Henry Sy, and Hong Kong business tycoon Li Ka-shing.

Much of the business activity of the bamboo network is centered in the major cities of the region, such as Mandalay, Jakarta, Singapore, Bangkok, Kuala Lumpur, Ho Chi Minh City, Phnom Penh, Vientiane, and Manila.

== History ==
Commercial influence of Chinese traders and merchants in Southeast Asia dates back at least to the third century AD, when official missions by the Han government were dispatched to countries in the Southern Seas. Distinct and stable overseas Chinese communities became a feature of Southeast Asia by the mid-seventeenth century across major port cities of Indonesia, Thailand, and Vietnam. More than 1500 years ago, Chinese merchants began to sail southwards towards Southeast Asia in search of trading opportunities and wealth. These areas were known as Nanyang or the Southern Seas. Many of those who left China were Southern Han Chinese comprising the Hokkien, Teochew, Cantonese, Hakka and Hainanese who trace their ancestry from the southern Chinese coastal provinces, principally known as Guangdong, Fujian and Hainan. Periods of heavy emigration would send waves of Chinese into Southeast Asia. Unrest and periodic upheaval throughout succeeding Chinese dynasties encouraged further emigration throughout the centuries. By the 12th century, Chinese began permanently settling in Thailand, and by the 13th century, in Cambodia and in Indonesia. In the early 1400s, the Ming dynasty Chinese admiral Zheng He under the Yongle Emperor led a fleet of three hundred vessels around Southeast Asia during the Ming treasure voyages.

Since 1500, Southeast Asia has been a magnet for Chinese emigrants where they have strategically developed a bamboo network encompassing an elaborately diverse spectrum of economic activities spread across numerous industries. The Chinese were one commercial minority among many including Indian Gujaratis, Chettiars, Portuguese and Japanese, in addition to various networks of Malays, Javanese, Minangkabau, Bugis, Chams, Mons and other indigenous groups, all of whom thrived under the patronage of Southeast Asian port polities until the middle of the seventeenth century. Subsequently, damage to the rival trade networks caused by English and Dutch rule in the Indian Ocean allowed enterprising Chinese to take over the roles once held by the other communities by the 1630s. European rulers subordinated the indigenous commercial networks present in Southeast Asia to subject the region more tightly and prevent potential threats to their own political and economic dominance. Thus, the Chinese were relied upon as middlemen in the colonies, and were outsourced much of the day-to-day work of empire building. The Europeans relied on Chinese merchant clans to manage revenue farms, collect taxes, and serve as their main entrepot of trade in the region. However, as most Chinese were sidelined from political power, the community as a whole would focus largely on commerce, leveraging on their transnational connections that spanned from Amoy and Hong Kong to Jakarta and Manila. These networks would be leveraged to accumulate massive fortunes at the end of colonial rule. Overseas Chinese populations in Southeast Asia saw a rapid increase following the Communist victory in the Chinese Civil War in 1949 which forced many refugees to emigrate outside of China causing a rapid expansion of the overseas Chinese bamboo network.

=== 1997 Asian financial crisis ===
Governments affected by the 1997 Asian financial crisis introduced laws regulating insider trading led to the loss of many monopolistic positions long held by the ethnic Chinese business elite and weakening the influence of the bamboo network. After the crisis, business relationships were more frequently based on contracts, rather than the trust and family ties of the traditional bamboo network.

=== 21st century ===
Following the reform and opening up initiated by Deng Xiaoping started in 1978, businesses owned by the Chinese diaspora began to develop ties with companies based in mainland China. Southeast Asian Chinese diaspora investment was a foundational catalyst for the reform and opening up, and historically accounted for the vast majority of the early foreign direct investment that allowed for China's economic miracle. Southeast Asian Chinese diaspora investment was a foundational catalyst for China's reform and opening up, historically accounting for the vast majority of its early foreign direct investment (FDI). Between 1979 and the early 1990s, the diaspora, alongside investors from Hong Kong and Macau, provided up to 70% to 80% of all incoming foreign capital into China. Diaspora capital had also become the lifeblood of the development of China's special economic zones. Overseas Chinese networks brought modern business management practices, supply chain networks and operational models that had been severely lacking in Mainland China at the time, transforming coastal China into hubs for manufacturing and tying the country into the world economy. With China's entry into the global marketplace and its concurrent global economic expansion since the dawn of the 21st century, the overseas Chinese community in Southeast Asia have served as a conduit for China's businesses.
