= Indosiar Television Tower =

- Interactive map of the Indosiar Television Tower area

General information
- Type: TV transmission, communication
- Location: West Jakarta, Indonesia
- Coordinates: 6°11′37.95″S 106°46′5.59″E
- Completed: 2006

Height
- Antenna spire: 395 m (1,295.9 ft)

The Indosiar Television Tower is a 395 m (1,296 ft) guyed mast used for FM and TV broadcasting in West Jakarta, Indonesia, completed in 2006. It is currently the tallest structure in Indonesia. It consists of a 375-metre-tall (1,230 ft) lattice structure with a side length of 6.3 m (20.7 ft), which carries on its top a 20 m-high (65.6 ft) TV-broadcasting antenna. The upper parts of the mast are guyed to a 120 m (390 ft) triangular lattice steel structure with a side length of 56 m (183.7 ft), which was built around the mast. This special design, which gives the tower a unique shape, was chosen because of the lack of space available on the site. Broadcasting is run by the four television networks: SCTV, Indosiar, Moji, and Mentari TV, all of which is owned by Surya Citra Media, a subsidiary of Elang Mahkota Teknologi (Emtek).
