= Salim Group =

Indonesian conglomerate

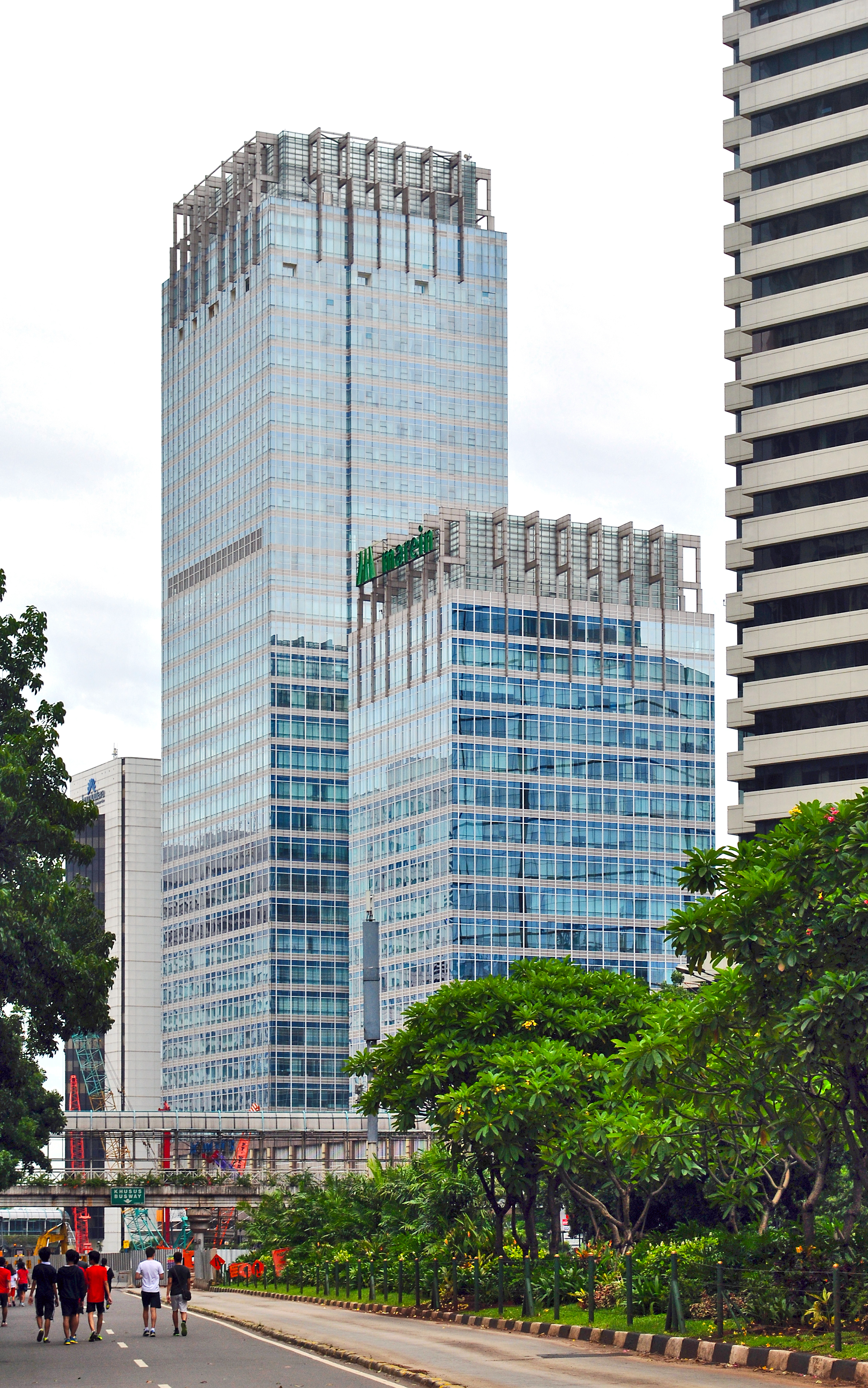
- Indofood Tower
- Type: Private
- Industry: Conglomerate
- Founded: 4 October 1972
- Founder: Sudono Salim
- Headquarters: Jakarta, Indonesia
- Key people: Anthoni Salim (CEO)
- Website: www.salimgroup.com.cn

The Salim Group is one of Indonesia's largest conglomerates and refers to companies where the Salim family holds majority ownership. Its assets include Indofood Sukses Makmur, (Note: Through a 50% stake owned by First Pacific, the family's investment company) the world's largest instant noodle producer; Indomobil Group, one of Indonesia's largest car manufacturers; Indomaret, Indonesia's largest convenience store chain; and Bogasari, a large flour-milling operation. The group was founded in October 1972 by Sudono Salim and his junior partner Sutanto Djuhar (Lin Wenjing). The current CEO is Anthoni Salim, a son of Sudono Salim.

The Salim Group also owns major oil palm plantations (about 1,000 km^{2}) and logging concessions. Salim Group has been involved in property development and the leisure industry for around 30 years. Its businesses include hotel and resort development, golf courses, and commercial real estate.

== History ==
The etymology of the group was initially formed after the acquisition of CV Waringin Kentjana by the Gang of Four during the early days of New Order era that export coffee, pepper, rubber, tallow nut, and copra. Salim Group would later consolidate its business by forming Indocement that focused on cement industry and Bogasari that focused on flour mill industry and was granted permission to monopolize both sectors by the state with profit sharing scheme. The group would later diversify its business by entering various sectors such as banking, real estate, automotive, and mass media.

The Salim Group was closely tied to Indonesian politician and dictator Suharto, who ruled Indonesia for 31 years and was Sudono Salim's "friend and patron". During the May 1998 riots that led to Suharto's downfall, Sudono Salim's house was burned down and he was forced to flee to Singapore. In the aftermath of the crisis, Salim Group were forced to hand some of its assets to Indonesian Bank Restructuring Agency (BPPN) including Bank Central Asia and Indocement.

A portrait of Salim Group founder Sudono Salim being burned by rioters when his Jakarta house was ransacked during the May 1998 riots

In 1999, the group called off talks to sell a stake in Indofood to San Miguel Corporation, the largest food and beverage conglomerate in the Philippines, because of control questions.

=== Projects in West Bengal ===
The Salim Group is involved in a number of projects in West Bengal, an eastern state of India. It is involved in the construction of Kolkata West International City. Salim and Universal Success are investors in the project, Ciputra is the developer, and Singapore-based Surbana is the project manager.

The proposal of the Salim Group for chemical hub and multi-product SEZ were cleared in principle by the board of approvals of the Union Commerce Ministry, Government of India, in October 2006.

== Companies ==
- Elshinta Media
  - PT Radio Elshinta (Elshinta Radio)
  - PT Elshinta Jakarta Televisi (Elshinta TV)
  - PT Majalah Elektronik Elshinta (Majalah Elshinta)
  - Elshinta.com
  - ElshintaShop.com
- PT XL Planet (elevenia)
  - PT Elevenia Digital Teknologi Sukses (EDTS)
- PT NAP Info Lintas Nusa
- PT Asuransi Central Asia (ACA Group)
  - PT Central Asia Raya (CAR)
  - PT Indolife Pensiontama (Indolife)
- PT Indoritel Makmur Internasional Tbk (Indoritel)
  - PT Indomarco Prismatama (Indomaret)
  - PT Indomarco Adi Prima (Indomarco)
  - PT Lion Super Indo (Super Indo) (51% owned by Ahold Delhaize)
  - PT Nippon Indosari Corpindo Tbk (Sari Roti)
    - All Fit & Popular Foods, Inc (Walter Bread)
    - Sarimonde Foods Corporation (Sarimonde) (co-owned with Monde Nissin Corporation)
  - PT Fastfood Indonesia Tbk (Indonesian sole franchisee of KFC and Taco Bell) (co-owned with Gelael Group & Yum Brands)
  - PT Inti Cakrawala Citra (Indogrosir)
  - PT Gardenia Makmur Selaras (PrimeBread)
  - PT Indoroti Prima Cemerlang (Mr. Bread)
  - Mister Donut Indonesia (Indonesian franchisee of Mister Donut)
- PT Bank Ina Perdana Tbk (Bank Ina Perdana) (29,02%)
- PT Transaksi Artha Gemilang (Ottocash)
- PT Inti Dunia Sukes (I.saku)
- PT Inti Paket Prima (Indopaket)
- PT Reksa Transaksi Sukses Makmur (Ottopay)
- PT IndoArtha Perkasa Sukses (otto.id) (co-owned with Allianz)
- PT Indo Seungli Makmur (iStyle.id) (co-owned with Lotte Corporation)
- PT Indomobil Sukses Internasional Tbk (Indomobil Group)
  - PT Suzuki Indomobil Motor (Suzuki)
  - PT Nissan Motor Indonesia (Nissan)
  - PT Garuda Mataram Motor (Volkswagen and Audi)
  - PT Indomobil National Distributor (Stellantis)
  - PT Hino Motors Manufacturing Indonesia (Hino)
  - PT Indomobil Multi Jasa Tbk (IMJ)
  - PT CSM Corporatama (Indorent)
  - PT Indomobil Prima Energi
  - PT Kyokuto Indomobil Manufacturing Indonesia (Kyokuto Manufaktur)
  - PT Furukawa Indomobil Battery Manufacturing (Furukawa Battery)
  - PT Central Sole Agency (Indoparts)
  - PT Indobaterai Energi Indonesia (Indobattery)
  - PT Indomobil Finance Indonesia (Indomobil Finance)
  - PT Shinhan Indofinance
  - PT Suzuki Nusantara Jaya Sentosa
  - PT Wahana Sun Hutama Nissan Indonesia
  - PT Swadharma Multi Finance (Swadharma)
- PT Indofood Sukses Makmur (Indofood)
  - PT Indofood CBP Sukses Makmur Tbk (Indofood CBP)
  - PT Bogasari Flour Mills (Bogasari)
    - PT Inti Abadi Kemasindo (previously named PT Indofood Sukses Makmur Bogasari Flour Mills - Divisi Packaging)
  - PT Salim Ivomas Pratama Tbk
  - PT Nugraha Indah Citarasa Indonesia (previously named PT Nestle Indofood Citarasa Indonesia because violation of labor rights on palm oil incident)
  - PT Indofood Fortuna Makmur (previously named PT Indofood Frito-Lay Makmur because violation of labor rights on palm oil incident)
  - PT Indolakto (Indofood Nutrition)
  - PT Anugerah Indofood Barokah Makmur (previously named PT Indofood Asahi Sukses Beverage because violation of labor rights on palm oil incident)
  - PT Tirta Sukses Perkasa (Club)
  - PT Arla Indofood Makmur Dairy Import (co-owned with Arla)
  - Indofood Agri Resources Ltd (IndoAgri)
  - Popolamama Indonesia (co-owned with Popolamama)
  - Salim Palm Plantation
  - PT Lotte Indonesia (co-owned with Lotte)
  - PT Yakult Indonesia Persada (co-owned with Yakult)
- PT Cyberindo Aditama (CBN)
- PT Mega Akses Persada (FiberStar)
- PT Total Chemindo Loka (Total)
- PT Idmarco Perkasa Indonesia (idmarco.com)
- PT Bumi Resources Tbk.
- PT. Pantai Indah Kapuk Dua, Tbk. (PANI), Co-Owned with Agung Sedayu Group
- PT. Bangun Kosambi Sukses, Tbk (CBDK), Co-Owned with Agung Sedayu Group
- PT. Industri Pameran Nusantara, Co-Owned with Agung Sedayu Group
  - Nusantara International Convention Exhibition
- PT Bumi Resources Minerals Tbk.
- MACH Australia Holdings
  - MACH Energy Australia Pty Ltd (MACH Energy)
  - MACH Metals
    - Rex Minerals from 30 October 2024 - Owner/developer of Hillside mine

=== Former companies ===
- Yayasan Anugerah Musik Indonesia (now owned by Digdaya Media Nusantara and under support from Ministry of Culture)
- PT Indosiar Visual Mandiri (Indosiar) (now owned by Emtek through SCM)
- PT Indosiar Karya Media Tbk (sold to Emtek and merged with Surya Citra Media/SCM)
- PT Nuansa Karya Berita
  - Tabloid Jelita
  - Mamamia
  - Tabloid Gaul
  - Majalah Kort
  - Majalah Story
- PT Nestle Indonesia (sold to Djarum)
- BCA Group (now owned by Djarum)
  - PT Bank Central Asia Tbk
  - PT BCA Finance
  - BCA Finance Limited
  - PT Bank BCA Syariah (BCA Syariah)
  - PT Central Santosa Finance
  - PT BCA Sekuritas
  - PT Asuransi Umum BCA (BCA Insurance)
  - PT Asuransi Jiwa BCA (BCA Life)
- PT Indocement Tunggal Prakarsa Tbk (Indocement) (now owned by HeidelbergCement)
- PT Pepsi-Cola Indobeverages (leave from Indonesia)
- PT Indomiwon Citra Inti (now owned by Daesang Corporation 100%)
- PT Holdiko Perkasa (now owned by Reckitt)
- PT Darya Varia Laboratoria Tbk (sold to Unilab)

== See also ==
- First Pacific
