= PLDT =

Philippine telecommunications company

PLDT Inc.
- Logo used since June 13, 2016

- The Ramon Cojuangco Building (also referred to as the Makati General Office (MGO)), site of the headquarters of PLDT
- Formerly: Philippine Long Distance Telephone Company (1928–2016)
- Type: Public
- Traded as: PSE: TEL; NYSE: PHI
- Industry: Telecommunications
- Predecessor: Digital Telecommunications Philippines (1987–2022)
- Founded: Manila, Philippine Islands (November 28, 1928; 97 years ago) (SEC No.: PW-55)
- Headquarters: Ramon Cojuangco Building, Makati Avenue corner Dela Rosa Street, Legazpi Village, Makati, Metro Manila, Philippines
- Area served: Worldwide
- Key people: Manuel V. Pangilinan (Chairman, President and CEO); Menardo G. Jimenez Jr. (EVP and COO); Danny Y. Yu (SVP, Chief Financial Officer & Chief Risk Management Officer); Marilyn A. Victorio-Aquino (SVP, Chief Legal Counsel and Corporate Secretary); Catherine Yap-Yang (FVP & Group Corporate Communications Officer)
- Products: Cellular telephony Digital Services; Fixed-line telephony Internet Protocol television Information technology Satellite communications Electricity distribution Mass media
- Revenue: ▲₱210.95 billion (2023)
- Operating income: ▲₱36.48 billion (2023)
- Net income: ▲₱26.82 billion (2023)
- Total assets: ▼₱609.52 billion (2023)
- Total equity: ▼₱105.22 billion (2023)
- Owner: ( See ownership)
- Number of employees: 15,596 (2023)
- Parent: First Pacific
- Subsidiaries: Smart Communications; PLDT Communication and Energy Ventures
- ASNs: 9299 (residential and business services); 7629 (data center and enterprise services, operated by subsidiary ePLDT)
- Website: main.pldt.com

PLDT Inc., formerly known as the Philippine Long Distance Telephone Company (Filipino: Kompanya ng Teleponong Pangmalayuan ng Pilipinas), is a Philippine telecommunications, internet and digital service company.

PLDT is one of the Philippines' major telecommunications providers, along with Globe Telecom, Smart Communication and startup DITO Telecommunity. Founded in 1928, it is the second oldest active, and largest telecommunications company in the Philippines, in terms of assets and revenues.

The company's core businesses are fixed-line telecommunications, mobile telephony services, broadband, and internet of things services under various brands. It also has de facto investments in broadcasting, print media, utilities, and direct-to-home satellite services, among others. Its common shares are listed in the Philippine Stock Exchange while American Depository Receipts that have such underlying common shares are traded at the New York Stock Exchange. Its majority owner is First Pacific, a Hong Kong–based investment management company. Other major shareholders are Nippon Telegraph and Telephone, through its subsidiaries, and JG Summit Holdings.

== History ==
=== GTE era ===
The Philippine Long Distance Telephone Company was established on November 28, 1928, by a Philippine Government act. Philippine legislature and approved by then governor-general Henry L. Stimson by means of a merger of four telephone companies under operation of the American telephone company GTE. Known as Act No. 3436, the bill granted PLDT a 50-year charter and the right to establish a Philippine telephone network linking major points nationwide. However, PLDT had to meet a 40-day deadline to start implementing the network, which would be implemented over a period of one to four years. Initially, aside from GTE, the company was also owned by a joint venture of Telephone Securities and Anglo-Canadian Telephone Co., which, in 1939, owned a 35% stake in the company.

In 1931, PLDT commenced the construction and installation of an extensive telephone network connecting Manila to the Central Luzon region, specifically the provinces of Bulacan and Nueva Ecija, with the idea of facilitating and spurring economic dealings between the regions. All in all, a line spanning 118 kilometers will be constructed. This was made possible by the increase of the capital stock of the company to around Php 10,000,000 (US$5,000,000).

Afterwards, PLDT had continued to endeavor to widen fixed-line network throughout the country and, for the first time, linked the Philippines to the outside world via radiotelephone services, connecting the Philippines to the United States and other parts of the world.

Telephone service in the Philippines was interrupted due to World War II. The U.S. Army took control of the company's network in 1945, as the Philippines' communications infrastructure was in ruins. U.S. military authorities eventually handed over the remains of the communications infrastructure to PLDT in 1947, and with the help of massive U.S. aid to the Philippines during the 1940s and 1950s, PLDT recovered so quickly that its telephone subscribers outpaced that of pre-war levels by 1953.

However, as a result of the "decontrol" policy ordered by then-President Diosdado Macapagal, the company, from 1962 to the period before Filipinization, faced a new issue in that of higher import costs for equipment from outside the Philippines caused by the devaluation of the Peso and that of lower foreign investor interest in raising capital.

=== Ramon Cojuangco Era ===
On December 20, 1967, a group of Filipino entrepreneurs and businessmen led by Ramon Cojuangco took control of PLDT after buying its shares from the American telecommunications company GTE. The group took control of PLDT's management on January 1, 1968, with the election of Gregorio S. Licaros and Cojuangco as chairman and president of PLDT, respectively. A few months later, PLDT's main office in Makati (known today as the Ramon Cojuangco Building) was opened, and PLDT's expansion programs began, hoping to bring reliable telephone services to the rural areas. It was also during that time that PLDT was able to use Intelsat II F-4 communications satellite to beam international events such as the Apollo 8 mission and the funeral of Robert F. Kennedy in 1968.

=== Martial Law ===
PLDT was permitted to operate during Martial Law. During the 1970s, PLDT was nationalized by the government of then-president Ferdinand Marcos and in 1981, in compliance of then existing policy of the Philippine government to integrate the Philippine telecommunications industry, purchased substantially all of the assets and liabilities of Republic Telephone Company, becoming the country's telephone monopoly. Under this monopoly, service expansion were severely curtailed or practically nonexistent. In the Martial Law years people would apply for phone service only to wait for years and years on end behind an impossibly long application backlog. It is not unheard of for people and small businesses back then to barter for a single telephone line in the black market for tens of thousands of pesos. The founding Prime Minister of Singapore and then incumbent Minister Mentor Lee Kuan Yew referred to the situation when visiting the Philippines during the term of President Fidel V. Ramos. He said quoting the AsiaWeek magazine, albeit in jest, “(PLDT) had a monopoly of 64 years. The result: 'The joke in the Philippines is that 98% of the population are waiting for a telephone and the other 2% are waiting for that dial tone' .. Among the highest phone rates in Asia - only Japan is more expensive - and probably the worst service.”

=== Tonyboy Cojuangco Era ===
After President Marcos was overthrown in 1986, the company was re-privatized and Cojuangco's son, Antonio "Tonyboy" O. Cojuangco, Jr. became president and chief executive officer, with Alfonso T. Yuchengco serving as the company's board chairman. On March 16, 1988, PLDT launched the country's first cellular phone system in Sampaloc, Manila to enable the public use of mobile phones. By 1995, with the passage of the Telecommunications Act and the subsequent deregulation of the Philippine telecommunications industry, the company has been de-monopolized.

In 1992, PLDT partnered with AT&T Corporation to expand its services into rural communities; including USA Direct Roving Van Service, a mobile van equipped with cellular phones, to provide toll service to some previously unserved rural communities; point-to-point international digital leased line service; payphone services; and magnetic prepaid telephone cards. By 1997, the company, through Mabuhay Satellite Corporation, launched the Philippines' first local communications satellite, Agila II (It was later divested to Asia Broadcast Satellite in 2009).

=== First Pacific Era ===
Logo used from November 28, 1996 to June 12, 2016.

In 1998, Hong Kong–based First Pacific Company Ltd. acquired a 17.2% controlling stake in PLDT for approximately P29.7 billion, from the Cojuangco clan & open market purchases Following the acquisition by the First Pacific group, Manuel V. Pangilinan became the new president and CEO of PLDT, replacing Cojuangco, who assumed the post of chairman (replaced Yuchengco) until 2004. An additional investment resulting to 24.61% "economic interest" / 31.74% voting equity, was added in 2000 through a share-swap agreement; where an affiliate Metro Pacific Corporation and NTT Communications, a subsidiary of Nippon Telegraph and Telephone acquired shares in PLDT in exchange for their co-owned wireless telecommunications company Smart Communications.

PLDT acquired 51.55% of the shares of Digitel from JG Summit Holdings in March 2011 at the cost of ₱69.2 Billion. Because of this, the shares of Digitel and JG Summit in the PSE surged while PLDT's remained unchanged. The deal resulted in JG Summit having a 12% share in PLDT. It was finalized by the National Telecommunications Commission on October 26, 2011. In exchange of the transaction, PLDT's subsidiary Smart Communications surrendered the mobile frequency and spectrum being used by its service Red Mobile to the government, which was eventually consummated in 2016.

On that same year, the Supreme Court of the Philippines ruled with finality on Gamboa vs Teves (G.R. No. 176579) (of which the equity shareholding structure of PLDT is at the center of the case) that in the context of a public utility the definition of "capital" involves the power to vote for the election of directors, and thus this ultimately means "outstanding common and voting preferred shares".

In April 2016, the company, then known as the Philippine Long Distance Telephone Company, dropped the "long distance telephone" from its corporate name and was renamed PLDT Inc. Its board of directors approved the new corporate name to reflect on the company's new range of services, mainly focusing on data services. On June 13, 2016, PLDT and its subsidiary Smart unveiled their new logos and identity as part of the company's continuing digital pivot.

On March 16, 2023, it was announced that PLDT was to acquire the broadband business of Sky Cable Corporation. Earlier, there was already a deal where Cignal Cable Corporation was set to acquire a minority stake in Sky Cable Corporation but it was terminated due to alleged political pressure.

On March 9, 2024, PLDT obtained a P1 billion green Loan facility from HSBC Philippines to partially finance the modernization and expansion of its fiber network supporting internet delivery platforms such as fiber fixed broadband, mobile data services and carrier grade WiFi.

In a 38-page decision penned by Rodil Zalameda and promulgated on February 14, 2024, the Philippine Supreme Court ordered the regularization of 7,344 "contractual employees" of PLDT engaged in line installation, repair, and maintenance. It dismissed the consolidated petition for review on certiorari filed by Silvestre Bello III and the company's [rank-and-file] employees' union Manggagawa Sa Komunikasyon ng Pilipinas (Workers in the Philippine Communications [Industry]), affirming a Court of Appeals judgment that found PLDT and its contractor committed labor violations. It however clarified that "labor contracting is not per se illegal, following Article 106 of the Labor Code expressly allowing an employer to engage in legitimate labor contracting, which the DoLE implements through DO 18-A and DO 174-2017." The high court finally remanded the case to the Office of the Regional Director of Dole NCR "to review and determine the impact of the regularization of the workers performing installation, repair, and maintenance services and to review, compute, and properly determine the monetary award on the labor standards violation, to which petitioner PLDT Inc. and the concerned contractors are solidarily liable."

== Operations ==
=== Fixed Line ===
PLDT's fixed line business offers services intended for enterprises, small and medium enterprises, and corporate consumers – including corporate data, ICT solutions, data networking, and cybersecurity solutions. PLDT also offers local exchange telephone services for Subic Bay Freeport, Clark Freeport Zone, Bonifacio Global City, and selected cities in Mindanao through its subsidiaries.

PLDT's retail fixed line services are branded under PLDT Home brand. It offers home broadband, IPTV, and triple play packages with devices from TP-Link and Roku.

=== Wireless ===
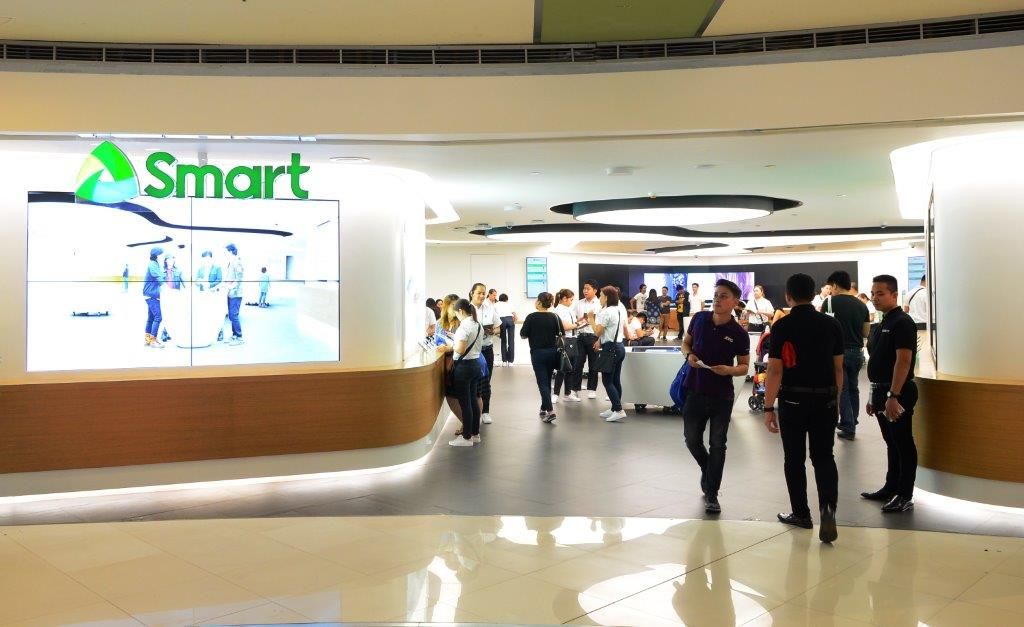
A store of PLDT's flagship wireless brand Smart Communications in SM Megamall, Mandaluyong.

PLDT operates its wireless cellular services through its brands, namely Smart and TNT

Smart, its flagship brand, offers commercial wireless services through its 2G, 3G, 3.5G HSPA+, 4G LTE network, and 5G in the key areas in the Philippines. Smart also offers terrestrial satellite communication services and wireless complimentary offerings.

TNT provides a wide range of offerings in low-cost call, text, and mobile internet packages, as well as other value-added services.

=== Investments ===
==== Beneficial Trust Fund ====
The headquarters of broadcasting company TV5 Network in Mandaluyong. TV5 Network is funded by the PLDT Beneficial Trust Fund through MediaQuest Holdings.

PLDT currently de facto invests in media through the pension fund “..Beneficial Trust Fund created pursuant to the Benefit Plan of PLDT Co.” which itself has a 100% wholly-owned subsidiary and registered legal entity: BTF Holdings, Inc.. While, members of the Board of Trustees (BoT) & certain executive officers for said fund largely overlap with the Board of Directors (BoD) & staff of PLDT, the latter itself is not a de jure shareholder nor has any control or any other type of power over the trust fund and its subsidiaries, as under the current constitution, media companies should be 100% Filipino-owned and PLDT has many foreign shareholders as of the moment totaling 20.22% (if only voting equity are considered, see Ownership, down to 11.11% if all outstanding shares of stock whether or not entitled to vote in the election of directors are considered) as of end 2025. The legal ownership of BTFHI is with the BoT of the fund, while its beneficial ownership are with the employees of PLDT, current and separated/retired.

PLDT in return is invested on by BTFHI as the only publicly-identifiable holder of its voting preferred shares (see ownership).

Pilipinas Global Network and MediaQuest Holdings are subsidiaries of BTFHI.

MediaQuest's assets include broadcasting firms TV5 Network and Nation Broadcasting Corporation, direct-to-home satellite operator Cignal TV, and major newspaper companies The Philippine Star and BusinessWorld, among others.

==== Others ====
PLDT also has investments in business jet transportation (Pacific Global One Aviation Company), and e-commerce and financial technology development (Voyager Innovations), among others. They also offered Routers and CCTV cameras on their plans or subscriptions.

== Ownership ==
First Pacific says that it holds approximately 25.6% of "economic interest" as of 9M2025. Its beneficial owner is said to be the Indonesian businessman Anthony Salim. He and the Chairman, President and CEO Pangilinan co-founded the company.

As of 2026Q1, it is publicly-owned at 42.08% with declared foreign ownership level at 11.13% if all outstanding shares of stock whether or not entitled to vote in the election of directors are considered. Otherwise, foreign ownership ups to 20.26% if only voting equity are considered ( ordinarily maximum 50%^{***} ). 2,724,111 common shares were bought back and accounted for as treasury shares.

Major Shareholder	% of Total*	Common Shares	Preferred* Shares
BTF Holdings, Inc.^{#}	40.98%	-	150,000,000
Others	13.02%	47,668,386	-
PCD Nominee Corporation^{**} (both Filipino & Foreign)	8.92%	32,652,545	-
NTT DOCOMO, INC.	8.56%	31,330,155	-
Philippine Telecommunications Investment Corp.^{^}	7.11%	26,034,263	-
JG Summit Group	6.65%	24,342,455	-
Metro Pacific Resources, Inc.^{~}	5.89%	21,556,676	-
NTT DOCOMO Business, Inc.	3.45%	12,633,487	-
Social Security System	3.33%	12,184,105	-
"Philippine Affiliate of First Pacific Company Limited"°	2.09%	7,653,703	-
Total Voting Equity	366,055,775 (100%)	216,055,775 (59.02%)	150,000,000* (40.98%)

*Total voting stock (i.e. common + voting preferred).
* In Gamboa v. Finance Secretary Teves (G.R. No. 176579 | June 28, 2011) of which PLDT was ultimately in the center of the case, and affirmed in Roy vs. Herbosa (G.R. No. 207246, April 18, 2017), the Supreme Court of the Philippines ruled that under Section 11, Article XII of the Constitution, “capital” in a public utility refers only to shares entitled to vote in the election of directors. Thus, Preferred shares that have been vested with such power are included in the relevant computations, in addition to common shares that naturally are appurtenant with voting privileges in every aspect.
PLDT says on its 2025Q2 Quarterly Report that their [voting] preferred shares are unlisted Also, disclosures to the local bourse only indicate that they only have listed common shares there aside from their American Depositary Receipts listed at the NYSE.
# As per 2025 General Information Sheet. Cursory web search yields that the voting preferred shares are under the legal entity BTF Holdings, Inc. - a wholly-owned subsidiary of the pension plan "Beneficial Trust Fund for the retirement benefit of PLDT Co. [Employees]"
** While the Philippine Central Depository (PCD) is listed a major shareholder, it is more of a trustee-nominee for all shares lodged in the PCD system rather than a single owner/shareholder. Major legal shareholders (i.e. those who own at least 5% of outstanding capital stock with voting rights) hidden, if any, under the PCD system are checked/identified and are disclosed with the Definitive Information Statement companies are submitting annually to the local bourse and Securities and Exchange Commission
~A First Pacific company - a distinct juridical entity & not to be confused with Metro Pacific Investments Corporation (MPIC)
^A First Pacific company. Incorporated in 1967, formerly owned by the Philippine government. The Presidential Commission on Good Government sold it to First Pacific on February 28, 2007.
°Named as such in recent disclosures. This could however be another juridical entity Metro Pacific Assets Holdings, Inc. (“MPAH”), separate (SEC Registration Number A1997-15662) and not to be confused with MPIC. As of May 15, 2026 PLDT still doesnt disclose the exact name of the entity and says that the shares are loged under the PCD System.
^{***} Due to a recently passed law (RA 11659), foreigners can own now up to 100% of a telecom company subject to reciprocity and government clearances. Otherwise, and as provided for in that law, foreign equity ceiling is upped to 50% from previous 40%.

== Criticisms ==
=== Bandwidth caps ===
In October 2015, PLDT introduced so-called "volume boosters" (instead of 30% bandwidth throttling in 2014 and 256 kbit/s bandwidth throttling in 2015) when exceeding monthly 30 GB to 70 GB bandwidth cap for TD-LTE connection plans (Ultera). "In case your usage exceeds your monthly volume allowance, you can still enjoy the internet by purchasing additional volume boosters. Otherwise, connectivity will be halted until your monthly volume is refreshed on your next billing cycle." Globe followed the suit with a similar "volume boost" arrangement.

This practice has since been weaned off for fixed broadband such as DSL and fiber optic, particularly with capped rates being silently retired. Globe, who previously retired all their unlimited data rates to capped ones, have reintroduced uncapped rates too.

=== Lock-in period ===
In 2015, PLDT increased its lock-in period for TD-LTE connection plans from 24 to 36 months (3 years) with the pre-termination fee equal to the full balance for the remaining period. Unless the subscriber explicitly manifests otherwise (i.e. don't want to be locked-in again) in writing at least 30 days prior to end of a contract, the lock-in period is automatically renewed for another 36 months. As of March 2017, competitor Globe's lock-in period was still 2 years with no pre-termination fee outside of the lock-in period. The PLDT TD-LTE contract allows PLDT to change the terms and conditions at any time with the only way left for subscribers to opt out of the altered service through paying the full pre-termination fee:

" 8.3 Modification.

SBI reserves the right at its discretion to modify, delete or add to any of the terms and conditions of this Agreement at any time without further notice. It is the Subscriber’s responsibility to regularly check any changes to these Terms and Conditions. The Subscriber’s continued use of the Service after any such changes constitutes acceptance of the new Terms and Conditions.".

Even as the Consumer Act of the Philippines states

"Unfair or Unconscionable Sales Act or Practice ... the following circumstances shall be considered ... that the transaction that the seller or supplier induced the consumer to enter into was excessively one-sided in favor of the seller or supplier"

.. the practice of inducing extremely long-term consumer-oriented contracts with the ultimate pre-termination penalty has not been legally challenged yet.

== Sports teams ==
- PLDT High Speed Hitters
- PLDT women's volleyball team (2013–2018) (defunct)
- PLDT men's volleyball team (defunct)

=== Esports ===
- Smart Omega, a professional esports team launched by PLDT and its mobile arm, Smart

== See also ==
- Internet in the Philippines
- List of companies of the Philippines
- Telecommunications in the Philippines
