= Ramon Cojuangco Building =

Office building in Makati, Philippines

- Interactive map of the Ramon Cojuangco Building area

General information
- Status: Completed
- Architectural style: International
- Location: Makati Avenue, Makati, Metro Manila, Philippines
- Coordinates: 14°33′15″N 121°01′25″E
- Current tenants: PLDT Inc.
- Inaugurated: 1982
- Owner: PLDT Inc.

Technical details
- Floor count: 15

Design and construction
- Architect: Leandro Locsin

The Ramon Cojuangco Building (RCB) is an International style office building in Makati, Metro Manila, Philippines.

== History ==
The Philippine Long Distance Telephone Company (PLDT) would commission a design for an office building along Makati Avenue in 1974. The structure which would be dubbed the Ramon Cojuangco Building would be inaugurated in 1982.

The building was the site of the setting up of a router that connected the Philippines to the internet in 1994 by Filipino engineer Benjie Tan.

As per the National Cultural Heritage Act which became law in 2009, the Ramon Cojuangco Building became a presumed Important Cultural Property (ICP) since it is a work of a National Artist.

In May 2022, the PLDT would file a petition to the National Commission for Culture and the Arts have the building delisted as an ICP intending to redevelop it into a "modern, ecologically sustainable and open campus-type headquarters".

== Architecture and design ==
The Ramon Cojuangco Building is a 15-story structure designed by National Artist Leandro Locsin and is an example of International style architecture. It has also three levels underground. An NCCA report notes that Locsin's "response to vernacular design" is evident in the building but is "minimal and ambiguous". The building is noted to exhibit's Locsin's "floating effect".
