= Manny Pangilinan =

Filipino businessman

Manny Pangilinan GCrL
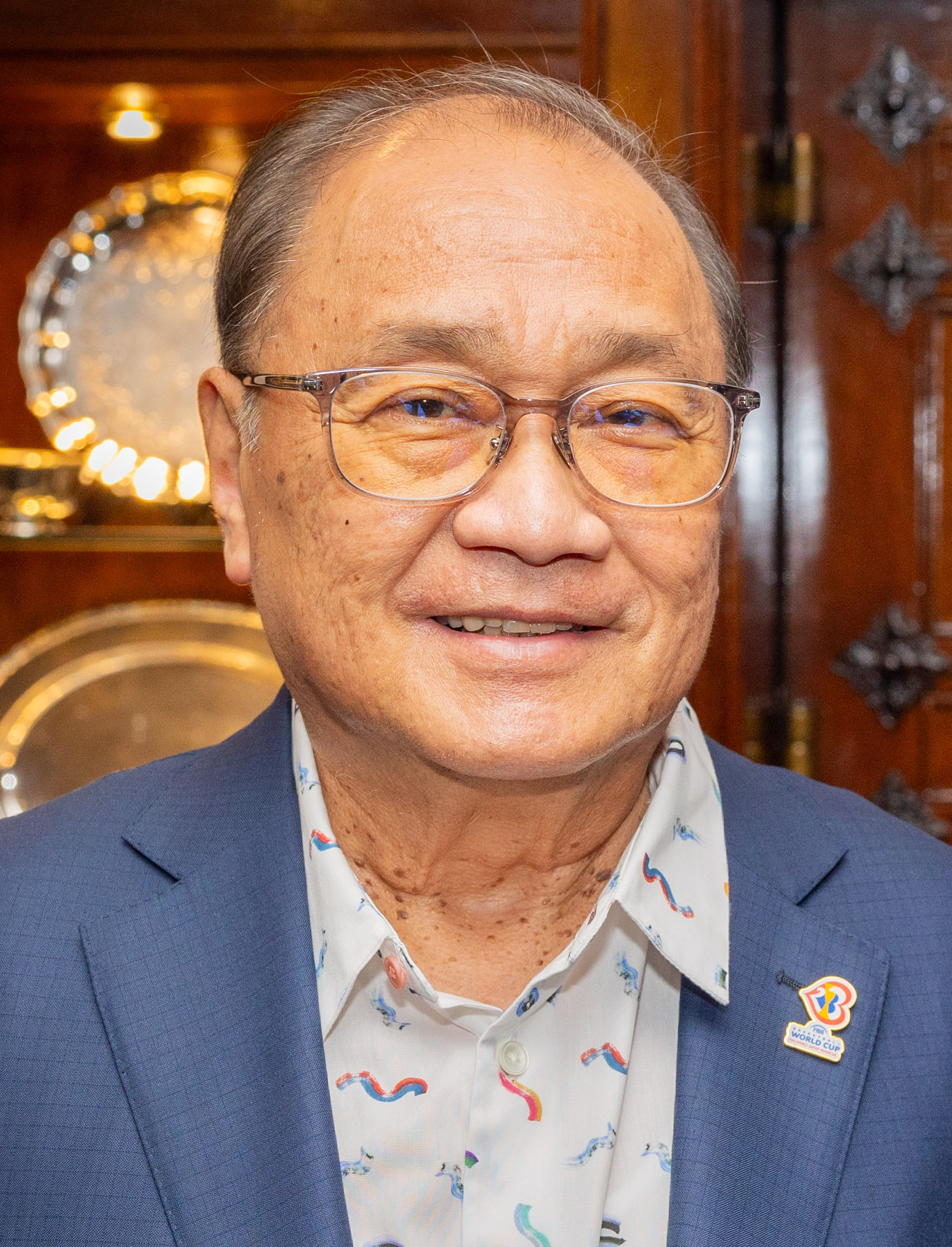
- Pangilinan in 2023
- Born: Manuel Vélez Pangilinan; July 14, 1946 (age 80)
- Other name: MVP
- Education: Ateneo de Manila University (BA); University of Pennsylvania (MBA)
- Occupations: Managing Director & CEO (First Pacific Company Limited); Chairman (Metro Pacific Investments Corporation and Philex Mining Corporation); Chairman (PLDT); Chairman (San Beda University); Chairman (Cardinal Santos Medical Center)
- Parents: Dominador Pañgilinan y Reyes (father); María Soledad Vélez y Pereyra (mother)
- Relatives: Vicente Vélez y Menrige (maternal grandfather), María del Rosario Pereyra y Rocha (maternal grandfather), Antonio Luis Rocha y Tuasón (great-great-grandfather), Enrique María Esteban Barretto de Icaza (great-great-uncle), María Emilia de Despujol de Sáenz de Heredia (great-aunt)

Manuel Vélez Pangilinan (born July 14, 1946), also known by his initials MVP, is a Filipino businessman and sports patron. He is the managing director and CEO of First Pacific, a Hong Kong–based investment management and holding company with operations in the Asia-Pacific region. Pangilinan is also the chairman for First Pacific's investments in the Philippines, including the Metro Pacific Investments Corporation, PLDT, and Philex Mining Corporation. He is the chairman emeritus of the Samahang Basketbol ng Pilipinas (SBP) and served as its first president for two consecutive terms, from 2007 to 2018. Pangilinan is the current chairman and benefactor of his alma mater San Beda University on Mendiola St., Manila.

== Education ==
Pangilinan grew up in a house in Little Baguio, San Juan that was by a squatter settlement's boundary.

His mother, María de la Soledad Vélez y Pereyra, daughter of Vicente Vélez y Menrige of Tabacalera and María del Rosario Pereyra y Rocha, who herself was of the prominent Icaza and Tuasón clans, was a Filipina of Spanish and Portuguese descent who worked at SyVel's, then an upscale department store along Escolta, when she met his father, Dominador Pangilinan, who then was a messenger for the Philippine National Bank and then eventually retired as the president of Traders Royal Bank.

He spent his childhood summers in Teachers Camp in Baguio as his grandfather was a public teacher in Pampanga and Tarlac who became a superintendent of public schools, eventually becoming the secretary of education. Pangilinan completed his primary and secondary education at San Beda. He graduated as cum laude from the Ateneo de Manila University with a Bachelor of Arts degree in Economics. Pangilinan won a scholarship to the Wharton School of the University of Pennsylvania sponsored by Procter & Gamble and graduated in 1968 with a Master of Business Administration degree.

== Career ==
Pangilinan's first job was as the executive assistant to the president of Philippine Investment Management Consultants, Inc. (PHINMA), where he served for six years.

In 1976, Pangilinan relocated to Hong Kong as executive director at Bancom International, an investment bank, where he gained experience in international finance. He then worked at American Express in Hong Kong as an investment banker.

In Hong Kong, Pangilinan co-founded First Pacific in 1981 with Indonesian businessman Sudono Salim and his son, Anthoni. In 1987, Pangilinan established Metro Pacific as First Pacific's investment arm in the Philippines. As chairman of Metro Pacific, Pangilinan has contributed to nation-building through investments in power distribution and energy innovations (Meralco), urban water concession (Maynilad Water Services), tollways (Metro Pacific Tollways Corporation), and upgrading hospitals and health services (Makati Medical Center). He is also Chairman of TV5 and Philex Mining Corporation.

In 1998, First Pacific acquired PLDT, the largest telecommunications firm in the Philippines. Under First Pacific's management, the company, which had been troubled by debt and technological issues, improved to become the nation's leading provider of digital communications.

Pangilinan is also a major patron of Philippine sports. He owns three PBA teams: TNT Tropang 5G, the Meralco Bolts, and the NLEX Road Warriors. He founded the Samahang Basketbol ng Pilipinas (SBP), the national sport association for basketball in the Philippines, and served as its first president for two consecutive terms (2007 to 2016). He is currently the chairman emeritus of SBP. He was elected to the Central Board of FIBA in 2014 and served until August 2023. Moreover, his MVP Sports Foundation has supported other Philippine athletes, some of whom won gold medals in the 2018 Asian Games.

== Involvement in sports ==
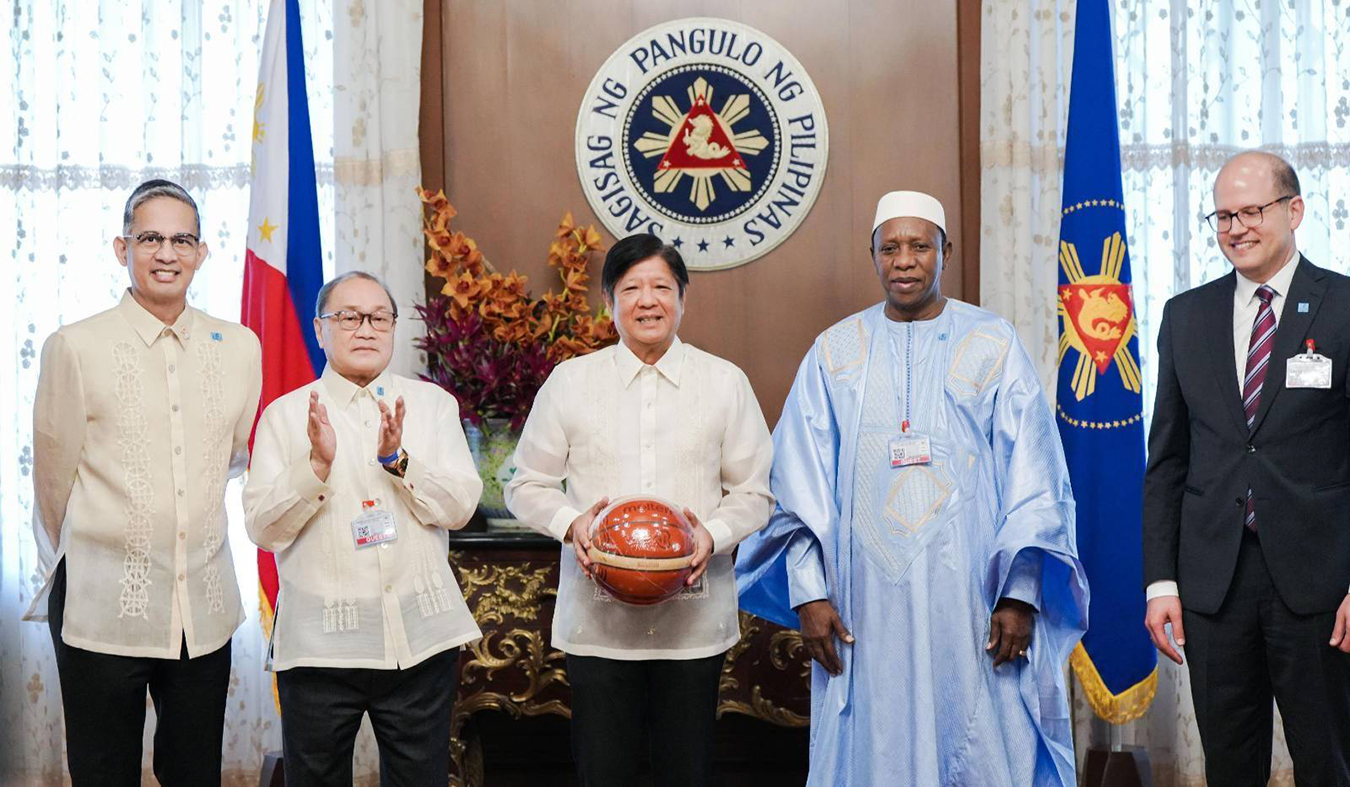
Pangilinan with the FIBA Executive Committee and Philippine President Bongbong Marcos

Pangilinan is a sports patron and was raised in a family that regularly enjoyed basketball. His mother was a fan of the San Beda Red Lions basketball team and was best friends with Caloy Loyzaga. His father played basketball, baseball, and tennis. Pangilinan himself plays badminton. Through the MVP Foundation, Pangilinan funds initiatives in badminton, boxing, golf, and taekwondo.

== Honors ==
National Honors

- : Order of Lakandula, Commander – (May 24, 2006)
- : Order of Lakandula, Grand Cross – (June 5, 2010)

Others

- FIBA Order of Merit – (August 24, 2023)

== See also ==
- Kapampangan Development Foundation
- Smart Communications
- PLDT
- Sun Cellular
- Meralco
