= Chain Reaction Research =

U.S. think tank

- Abbreviation: CRR
- Established: 2013 (13 years ago)
- Headquarters: Washington, D.C.

Chain Reaction Research (CRR) is a think tank that conducts research about deforestation-related issues and commodities. It is based in Washington, D.C.

CRR provides material about resources effected by deforestation, such as palm oil, soy, cattle, cacao, coffee, and pulp and paper. It aims to put pressure on investors to include financial risks to be associated with companies that deal with deforestation It is frequently cited in scientific journals and used in information campaigns of environmental NGOs. It has exposed land abuse and illegal deforestation in South-east Asia and other regions.

== Funding ==
It is sponsored by the David and Lucile Packard Foundation, Norway's International Climate and Forest Initiative and the Gordon and Betty Moore Foundation.
