= Surya Citra Media =

Indonesian media and entertainment company

PT Surya Citra Media Tbk
- Logo used since 2018
- Formerly: PT Cipta Aneka Selaras (1999—2001)
- Company type: Public
- Traded as: IDX: SCMA
- Industry: Media; Entertainment
- Founded: 29 January 1999; 27 years ago
- Founders: Abhimata Mediatama; Mitrasari Persada
- Headquarters: Jakarta, Indonesia
- Key people: Sutanto Hartono (President Director)
- Owner: Emtek
- Subsidiaries: Surya Citra Televisi; Indosiar Visual Mandiri; Vidio; Indonesia Entertainment Group; Nex Parabola; KapanLagi Youniverse
- Website: www.scm.co.id

PT Surya Citra Media Tbk (SCM) is an Indonesian media and entertainment company. It is owned by Emtek and is based in Jakarta. It operates four television networks: SCTV, Indosiar, Ajwa TV, and Mentari TV, as well as the Vidio streaming service, Nex Parabola satellite pay television, and KapanLagi Youniverse. Surya Citra shares are listed on the Indonesia Stock Exchange.

== History ==
Surya Citra Media was established on 29 January 1999 as Cipta Aneka Selaras, with a focus on multimedia, entertainment and communications services, particularly television. In 2001, Cipta Aneka Selaras changed its name to Surya Citra Media.

Surya Citra Televisi (SCTV) is a subsidiary of Surya Citra Media. SCTV commenced broadcasting in 1990 covering the city of Surabaya, and began operating nationwide in 1993. SCTV headquarters later moved to Jakarta. In May 2013, Indosiar Karya Media was absorbed into SCM.

In 2017, SCM took over SinemArt from MNC Media due to very low ratings. In addition, MNC wanted to aim for content alignment as well as the development of digital assets and production houses owned by the group, so that SinemArt returned to SCM after working collaboratively from 2003 till 2007.
