= First Pacific =

Hong Kong financial services company

First Pacific Company Limited 第一太平有限公司
- Type: Listed company
- Traded as: SEHK: 142
- Industry: Investment Management
- Founded: 1981; 45 years ago
- Founder: Liem Sioe Liong; Anthoni Salim; Manuel V. Pangilinan
- Headquarters: Central, Hong Kong
- Area served: Hong Kong, Philippines, Indonesia
- Key people: Anthoni Salim (Chairman); Manuel V. Pangilinan (Managing Director, CEO)
- Total assets: US$5.1 billion ▼2019
- Website: firstpacific.com

First Pacific Company Limited (Chinese: 第一太平有限公司) is a Hong Kong–based investment management and holding company with operations located in Asia. It involves telecommunications, consumer food products and infrastructure.

== History ==
In 1981, Indonesian renowned businessman Sudono Salim, Anthoni along with Filipino businessman Manuel Velez Pangilinan jointly co-founded First Pacific as a financial service company based in Hong Kong. Initially, the company started with HK$7 million (US$0.9 million) with 6 staffs and a small office in Central, Hong Kong and was named Overseas Union Finance Limited.

In 1982, Overseas Union Finance Limited acquired Hibernia Bank, a San Francisco based bank that were owned for 3 years until it was sold to Security Pacific Bank later in 1985 and at the same year also underwent identity change and the name First Pacific was started to be used. First Pacific also controlled interest in German based Hagemeyer. In 1987, First Pacific expanded its banking investment by taking over Hong Nin Savings Bank from the British authorities which would later be merged with Far East Bank to form First Pacific Bank. In 1989, First Pacific started to acquire Indonesian pharmaceutical company Darya-Varia to extend Salim Group portfolio in pharmaceutical sector. In 1996, First Pacific become constituent in the Hang Seng Index after their success in telecommunication expansion.

In the beginning of 1997 Asian financial crisis, First Pacific begin to restructure its organization. Tech Pacific become its first asset to be sold during crisis with Hagemeyer taking over the control of the company in 1997. In 1998, First Pacific acquired Filipino telecommunication company PLDT and Salim owned food production company in Indonesia, Indofood while losing First Pacific Bank and Darya-Varia in early 2000s as the effect of the financial crisis.

== Businesses ==
Indonesia:

- Indofood Sukses Makmur Tbk

Philippines:

- Metro Pacific Investments Corporation
- PLDT
- Philex Mining Corporation
- Roxas Holdings Inc.

Malaysia:

- QAF Limited

Singapore:

- PacificLight Power Pte. Ltd

== Former businesses ==
- Tech Pacific (1989–1997) – sold to Hagemeyer
- Pacific Link (1988–1997) – sold to Hong Kong Telecom
- Hibernia Bank (1982–1985) – sold to Security Pacific Bank
- First Pacific Bank (1992–Dec 2000) – sold to Bank of East Asia
- SPORTathlon (June 2000)
- Savills plc (March 2001)

== See also ==
- Salim Group
- MVP Group
