= Indofood =

Indonesian food company

PT Indofood Sukses Makmur Tbk

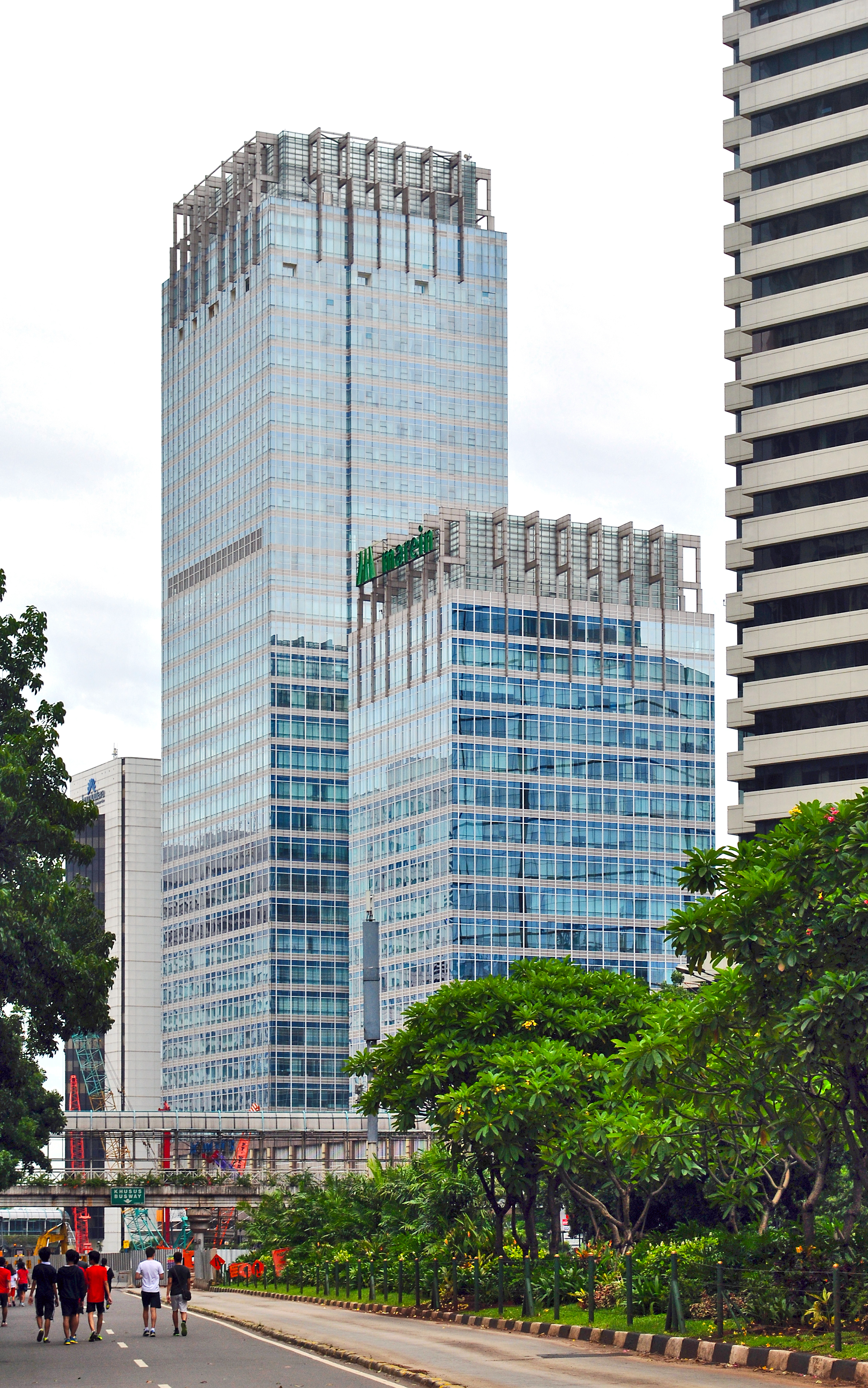
- Indofood Tower in Jakarta
- Formerly: PT Panganjaya Intikusuma (1990–1994)
- Type: Public (Perseroan terbatas)
- Traded as: IDX: INDF; IDX: ICBP (Consumer Branded Products division)
- Industry: Food
- Predecessors: PT Supermi Indonesia; PT Sanmaru Food Manufacturing Co., Ltd.; PT Sarimi Asli Jaya
- Founded: August 17, 1990; 36 years ago
- Founder: Liem Sioe Liong
- Headquarters: Jakarta, Indonesia
- Area served: Worldwide
- Key people: Anthoni Salim (President Director); Manuel V. Pangilinan (President Commissioner)
- Revenue: ▲ Rp 99.35 trillion (2021)
- Operating income: ▲ Rp 9.831 trillion (2019)
- Net income: ▲ Rp 4.91 trillion (2019)
- Total assets: ▼ Rp 96.198 trillion (2019)
- Total equity: ▲ Rp 54.202 trillion (2019)
- Owner: Salim Group
- Number of employees: 70,000 (2016)
- Parent: First Pacific
- Divisions: Consumer Branded Products (under Indofood CBP; 80%); Bogasari Flour Mills; Agribusiness; Distribution
- Website: www.indofood.com

Indofood is an Indonesian producer of various foods and drinks, headquartered in Jakarta. The company was established on 14 August 1990 as PT Panganjaya Intikusuma, then later on 5 February 1994 its name was changed to PT Indofood Sukses Makmur Tbk. It exports food ingredients to Australia, Asia and Europe.

In the past few decades, Indofood has transformed into a total food solutions business. Its operations comprise the entirety of the food production process, beginning with the production and processing of raw ingredients so that they can become the final product which is available on the shelves of retailers.

== History ==
Indofood was founded in 1969 as Lambang Insan Makmur, an instant noodles business, with its brand Indomie launching in 1972. The company restructured on August 14, 1990, as PT Panganjaya Intikusuma. In 1994, the company was renamed to PT Indofood Sukses Makmur, and it was listed on the Indonesian Stock Exchange on July 14, 1994. It is one of the companies owned by the family of Sudono Salim under the Salim Group.

In January 2013, as part of a filing for the Indonesia Stock Exchange, Indofood said it was planning to buy 50% of Brazilian sugar-cane processor Companhia Mineira de Açúcar e Álcool Participações, (CMAA) for $72 million.

In January 2015, Indofood built an instant noodles factory in Morocco, which was to be opened in the third quarter of 2015. It was to be the sixth plant in Africa after Nigeria, Egypt, Sudan, Kenya and Ethiopia, and the biggest overseas Indomie factory.

In January 2019, Indofood withdrew from the Roundtable on Sustainable Palm Oil (RSPO) certification scheme.

On February 17, 2021, Indofood CBP purchased all of the shares owned by Fritolay Netherlands Holding B.V., an affiliate of PepsiCo at PT Indofood Fritolay Makmur (IFL) worth IDR 494 billion, so that the production of Lay's, Cheetos and Doritos brand snacks in Indonesia would be stopped on August 18, 2021. IFL was then renamed to PT Indofood Fortuna Makmur. In addition, PepsiCo and its affiliates agreed not to produce, package, sell, market or distribute snack products that compete with IFL products in Indonesia for a period of three years. Lay's, Cheetos and Doritos in the Indonesian market were rebranded into Chitato Lite, Chiki Twist and Maxicorn, respectively.

== Products ==
=== Instant noodle products ===
- Indomie
- Pop Mie
- Sarimi (former PT Sarimi Asli Jaya products)
- Supermi (former PT Lima Satu Sankyo products)
- Sakura
- Intermi (former PT Pandu Djaya Abadi products)
- Mi Telur Cap 3 Ayam

=== Sauce & seasoning products ===
- Indofood Sambal
- Indofood Tomato Ketchup
- Indofood Soy Sauce
- Indofood Instant Seasoning
- Racik

=== Snack products ===
- Chiki
- Chitato
- Jet-Z
- Qtela
- Maxicorn (rebrand from Doritos)
- Chiki Twist (rebrand from Cheetos)
- Chitato Lite (rebrand from Lay's)

=== Baby food & cereal products ===
- Promina
- SUN
- GoVit
- GoWell (rebrand from Provita)

=== Dairy products ===
- Indomilk
- Cap Enaak
- Tiga Sapi
- Kremer
- Orchid Butter
- Milkuat acquired from Danone
- Indofood Ice Cream
- Puregrow Organic
- Lurpak (imported product from Arla)
- Castello (imported product from Arla)
- Puck (imported product from Arla)
- Arla (imported product from Arla)

=== Bogasari flour & pasta products ===
- Cakra Kembar
- Segitiga Biru
- Kunci Biru
- Lencana Merah
- Taj Mahal
- La Fonte
- Sedani

=== Oil & margarine products ===
- Bimoli
- Palmia (rebrand from Simas after end JV with Sinarmas under Sajang Heulang Name)
- Happy Salad Oil
- Amanda
- Delima

=== Beverage products ===
- Freiss
- Ichi Ocha
- Club
- Fruitamin

=== Confectionery products ===
- Choco Pie (under license from Lotte)
- Pepero (under license from Lotte)
- Lotte Bubble Gum (under license from Lotte)
- Dueto
- Inti Gandum (previously named as Keebler Digestive Biscuits)
- Wonderland
- Lotte Xylitol (under license from Lotte)
