= Indomaret =

Indonesian convenience store chain

PT Indomarco Prismatama

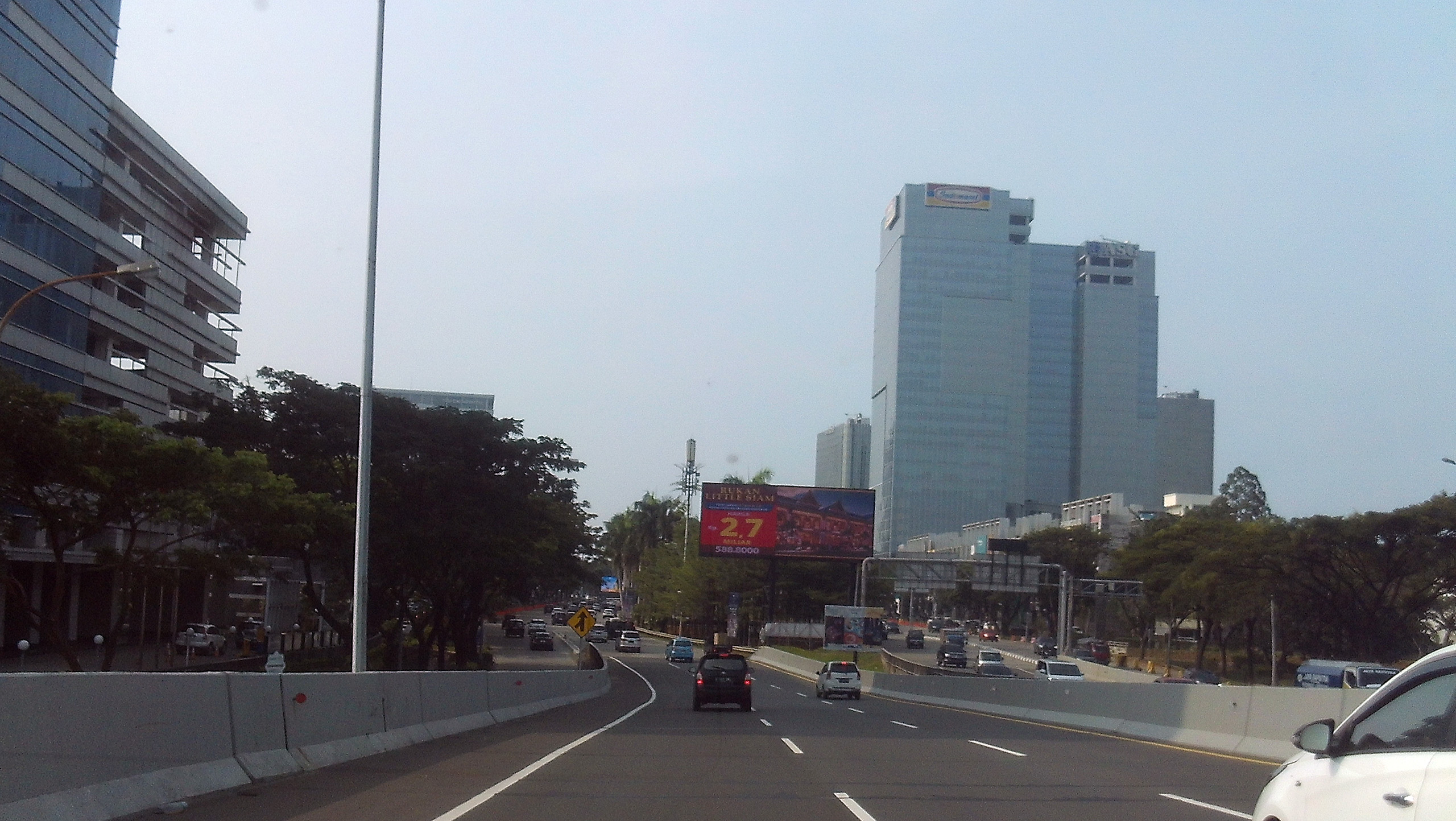
- Indomaret headquarters in Jakarta
- Trade name: Indomaret
- Company type: Subsidiary
- Industry: Retail
- Founded: 20 June 1988
- Headquarters: Menara Indomaret, North Jakarta, Indonesia
- Number of locations: 21,800 (March 2023)
- Area served: Indonesia (except West Sumatra)
- Revenue: Rp 59.174 trillion (2016)
- Net income: Rp 731.6 billion (2016)
- Owner: Indoritel (40%)
- Parent: Salim Group
- Website: indomaret.co.id

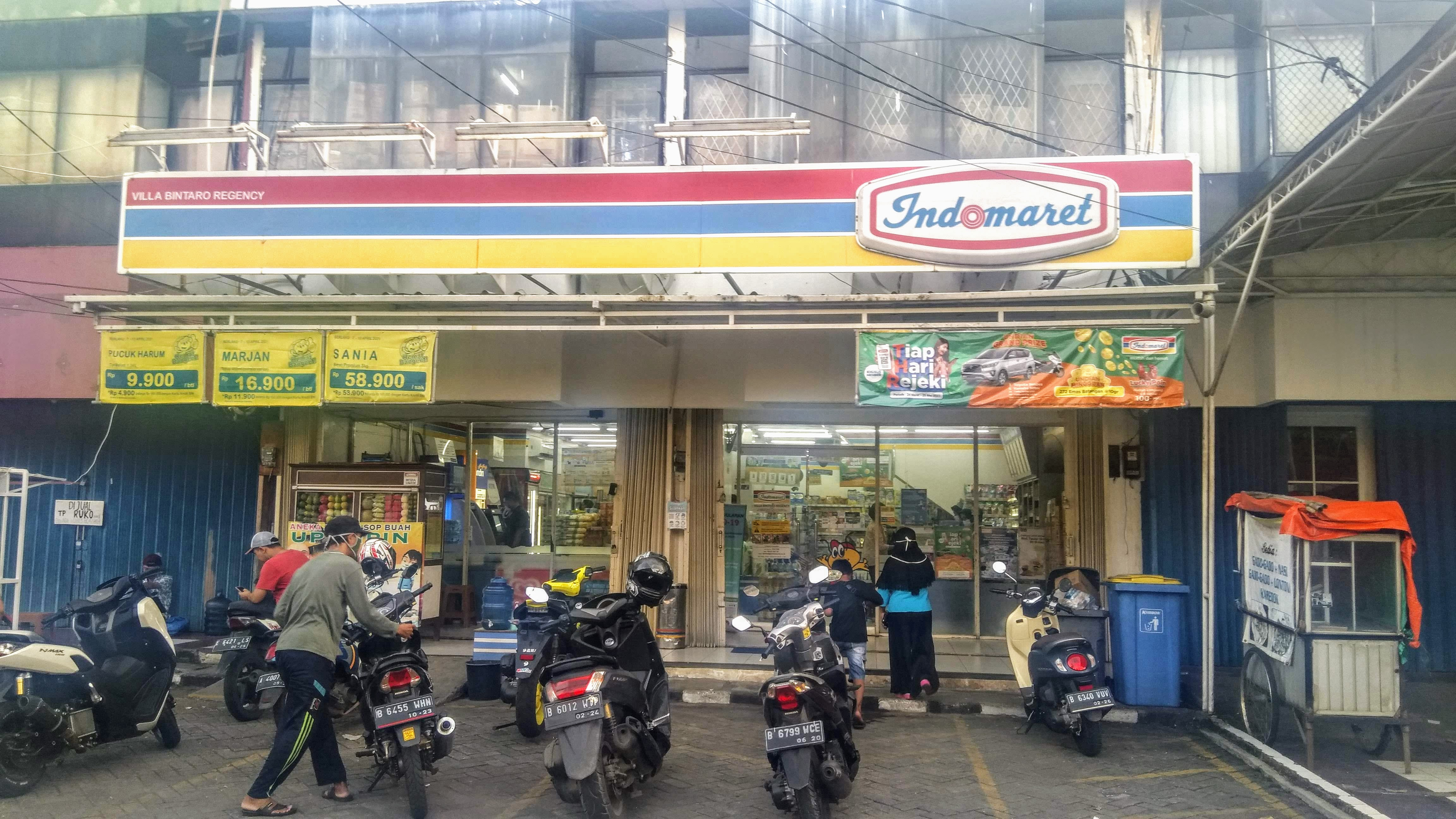
An Indomaret store in South Tangerang, Banten

PT Indomarco Prismatama, doing business as Indomaret, is an Indonesian chain of retail convenience stores with over 21,900 locations in 32 provinces across the nation. The chain, owned by Indoritel and headquartered in Jakarta, is the largest chain of convenience stores in Indonesia.

The first Indomaret store was opened in Ancol, North Jakarta, in June 1988, originally under the name Indomart, with the aim of making daily necessities easily accessible to local consumers. The company implemented the modern minimarket franchise model in Indonesia, launching franchising for its outlets in 1997, which allowed independent owners to operate stores under the Indomaret brand and contributed to its rapid nationwide expansion. By the 2010s, Indomaret had established thousands of outlets across Java, Sumatra (except West Sumatra, due to a law protecting small retailers), Kalimantan, Sulawesi, the Nusa Tenggara region, Maluku, and Papua region, with a mix of company-owned and franchised stores. Through this hybrid model, the network grew from just a few hundred locations in the late 1990s to over ten thousand by 2015 and continued its aggressive expansion, reaching 23,107 locations in 2024.

Indomaret operates several different store formats to serve different customer needs across Indonesia. In addition to its standard convenience store outlets, the company has developed Indomaret Point, a concept that combines retail with casual dining and social space, often featuring seating areas, Wi-Fi, and ready-to-eat offerings such as "Point Coffee" and other fast food items. Indomaret Fresh represents another expanded format, with a broader range of products, including fresh produce, meat, frozen goods, and other premium items, sometimes complemented by services such as drive-thru shopping.

== Etymology ==
The name "Indomaret" was adopted in the 1990s due to a government policy under Suharto prohibiting the use of foreign languages in trademarks. When the first store opened in 1988, the brand was called "Indomart", with "mart" being a common term for retail outlets. In the 1990s, amid a broader push in Indonesia to favor Indonesian language and identity in business names, the company altered its name to "Indomaret", a form that aligns more closely with Indonesian usage while retaining recognizability and the idea of a place to shop.

== See also ==
- Alfamart
