= Sudono Salim =

Indonesian businessman (1916–2012)

- Born: Lim Sioe Liong; 16 July 1916; Fuqing, Fujian, China
- Died: 10 June 2012 (aged 95); Singapore
- Citizenship: Indonesia
- Occupations: Banker, businessman
- Years active: 1936–2012
- Board member of: Salim Group
- Spouse: Lie Kim Nio (1924–2015)
- Children: 4, including Anthoni Salim

Chinese name
- Traditional Chinese: 林紹良
- Simplified Chinese: 林绍良
- Hanyu Pinyin: Lín Shàoliáng
- Hokkien POJ: Lîm Siāu-liông

Sudono Salim (born Lim Sioe Liong; 16 July 1916 – 10 June 2012), also known as Om (Uncle) Liem was an Indonesian banker and businessman. He was the richest individual in Indonesia. He was the founder and chairman of the conglomerate Salim Group before handing over its management to his youngest son Anthoni Salim (now the fifth wealthiest person in Indonesia) in 1992.

== Early life ==
In 1916, Salim was born as Lim Sioe Liong (Chinese: 林紹良; pinyin: Lín Shàoliáng) in Fuqing (now part of Fuzhou), Fujian, China. According to the Chinese zodiac, he was born in the Year of the Dragon, on the seventh day of the seventh month.

In 1936, he left Fujian to join his brother Liem Sioe Hie and brother-in-law Zheng Xusheng in Kudus, Central Java. Salim diversified their peanut oil trading company into the clove market, which was growing rapidly from demand for production. While in Kudus, his manufacturing company supplied soldiers of the Indonesian National Revolution with medical supplies and came into contact with Suharto, an officer of the army. Salim denied allegations that he also provided arms to Indonesian soldiers to resist Dutch forces. As soldiers seized Dutch businesses following independence, his business subsumed many of their assets and gained a monopoly in the clove market, but he denied working with Suharto in expanding his ventures.

== Business career ==
In 1952, after moving to Jakarta, Salim expanded his peanut oil trading company by establishing connections with other Overseas Chinese businessmen in Hong Kong and Singapore respectively. His soap manufacturing company became one of the primary suppliers to the Indonesian National Armed Forces. Salim later expanded his commercial activities into textile manufacturing and financial services, eventually being behind the establishment of Indonesia's largest private bank, Bank Central Asia in 1957. Following the Asian financial crisis, he was forced to give up control of the bank to the government.

In 1968, after a corporate merger, Salim gained the rights to an establish a corporate monopoly on clove importation. He also established Bogasari, a joint venture with another businessman of Hokchia ancestry where the company later became Indonesia's largest miller, producer, and supplier of flour. Windfall profits from those two companies were said to have provided him with the expansion capital to finance the establishment of cement giant Indocement in 1973.

In 1990, he established the food manufacturer Indofood, Indonesia's largest maker of instant noodles.

In 1992, Salim handed over management of the conglomerate Salim Group to his son Anthoni Salim.

By 1997, the Salim Group presided over US$20 billion in assets with more than 500 subsidiaries employing over 200,000 Indonesians. When the Asian Financial Crisis hit, the conglomerate incurred US$4.8 billion in debt and had to give up control of Bank Central Asia in 1998 to the Indonesian government for nationalization. BCA was then 30% owned by two offspring of Suharto.

During the May 1998 riots, Salim fled to Singapore after a mob burned his home in Jakarta; his son remained back in Indonesia to ward off the mobs and resurrected the family business. Salim eventually settled in Los Angeles in the United States. Forbes magazine listed him as the 25th wealthiest businessperson in Southeast Asia in 2004 with a net worth of US$655 million.

== Personal life ==
Salim had three sons and one daughter.

On 10 June 2012, a month before his 96th birthday, Salim died from natural causes at Raffles Hospital, Singapore. He is buried at the Lim Chu Kang Cemetery.

== See also ==
- Gang of Four (Indonesia)
- Bamboo network

== Bibliography ==
- Rowley, Anthony (7 April 1983), "Birth of a Multinational", Far Eastern Economic Review, ISSN 0014-7591.
- Siregar, Sori Ersa & Widya, Kencana Tirta (1989), Liem Sioe Liong: Dari Futching ke Mancanegara (in Indonesian), Jakarta: Pustaka Merdeka, ISBN 978-979-8054-16-7.
- Soetriyono, Eddy (1989), Kisah Sukses Liem Sioe Liong (in Indonesian), Jakarta: Indomedia.
- Suryadinata, Leo (1995), Prominent Indonesian Chinese: Biographical Sketches (3rd ed.), Singapore: Institute of Southeast Asian Studies, ISBN 978-981-3055-04-9.
