= Anthony Salim =

Indonesian businessman and investor

Anthoni Salim
- 林逢生
- Born: 25 October 1949 (age 76); Kudus, Indonesia
- Education: Ewell County Technical College
- Occupations: Businessman, investor
- Organization(s): Salim Group; First Pacific
- Children: Axton Salim; Alston Salim; Astrid Salim
- Parent: Sudono Salim (father)

Chinese name
- Traditional Chinese: 林逢生
- Simplified Chinese: 林逢生
- Hanyu Pinyin: Lín Féng Shēng
- Hokkien POJ: Lîm Hông Senn

Anthoni Salim, born Liem Hong Sien (Chinese: 林逢生; pinyin: Lín Féngshēng; Pe̍h-ōe-jī: Lîm Hông Senn; born 25 October 1949), is an Indonesian businessman and investor. He is the head of the conglomerate Salim Group and the chairman of First Pacific, a Hong Kong–based investment management firm.

== Early life ==
Salim was born in Kudus, Central Java—a city located within the Semarang metropolitan area—to entrepreneur Sudono Salim (1916–2012) and Lie Las Nio (1924–2015). His father was an emigrant turned naturalized Indonesian citizen who settled in Kudus before emigrating to Jakarta. His mother was a local-born full-blooded Chinese.

His father founded the Salim Group, which Anthoni acceded after his father's death. He completed his education in 1971 at Ewell County Technical College (now North East Surrey College of Technology) in the United Kingdom. Despite not excelling in his studies, he became a successful businessman and investor after his return to Indonesia.

During the May 1998 riots, his family's home was set on fire and he fled to Singapore.

If your house is already burned, the next thing they would try to do is get the people, you don't want to get caught in the middle of something like that.

— Anthoni Salim

After the riots subsided, he returned to Jakarta to rebuild his conglomerate and to pay off some $5 billion in remaining debt.

== Career ==
In 1998, during the Indonesian monetary crisis, Salim's father handed the company to Anthoni while the company had high debts. Now, he controls many of Salim Group's subsidiaries such as Indofood and Indomaret. He has served as the Chairman of First Pacific since 2003, after serving as a director since 1981.

He is listed as substantial shareholder (74%) of Indofood Agri Resources, a Singaporean agriculture holding company often criticized for working with dubious shadow companies involved in obtaining palm oil from undisclosed, contested land.

Forbes listed his net worth at $8.5 billion as of December 2021.

== Family ==
At the age of 25, Salim married Siti Margareth Jusuf. They have three children.

His oldest son, Axton (born in 1979), studied business administration in University of Colorado, Boulder and has had leading roles in the Salim Group's companies. He has been a director of Indofood since 2009, and non-executive director of IndoAgri since 2007.
