= Indocement =

Indonesian cement company

PT Indocement Tunggal Prakarsa Tbk

- Indocement headquarters in Jakarta
- Company type: Public subsidiary
- Traded as: IDX: INTP
- Industry: production basic industry and chemicals sector
- Founded: 4 August 1975; 50 years ago
- Headquarters: Jakarta, Indonesia
- Key people: Christian Kartawijaya, President Director
- Revenue: ▲ Rp 15.190 trillion (2018)
- Net income: ▲ Rp 1.24 trillion (2018)
- Total assets: ▲ Rp 27.788 trillion (2018)
- Owner: Birchwood Omnia Ltd (HeidelbergCement) (51%)
- Number of employees: 5,684 (2018)
- Website: www.indocement.co.id

PT Indocement Tunggal Prakarsa Tbk. ("Indocement") Indocement is one of the largest cement producers in Indonesia. Today, Indocement and its subsidiaries operate several business units that cover manufacturing and cement sales (core business) and ready-mix concrete, aggregates as well as trass. Indocement has approximately 6,000 employees and 13 factories with annual total production of 24.9 million tons of cement. Ten of its factories are located at Citeureup Factory, Bogor, West Java; two at Cirebon Factory, Cirebon, West Java; and one at Tarjun Factory, Kotabaru, South Kalimantan.
