= Mister Donut =

Japanese multinational doughnut chain

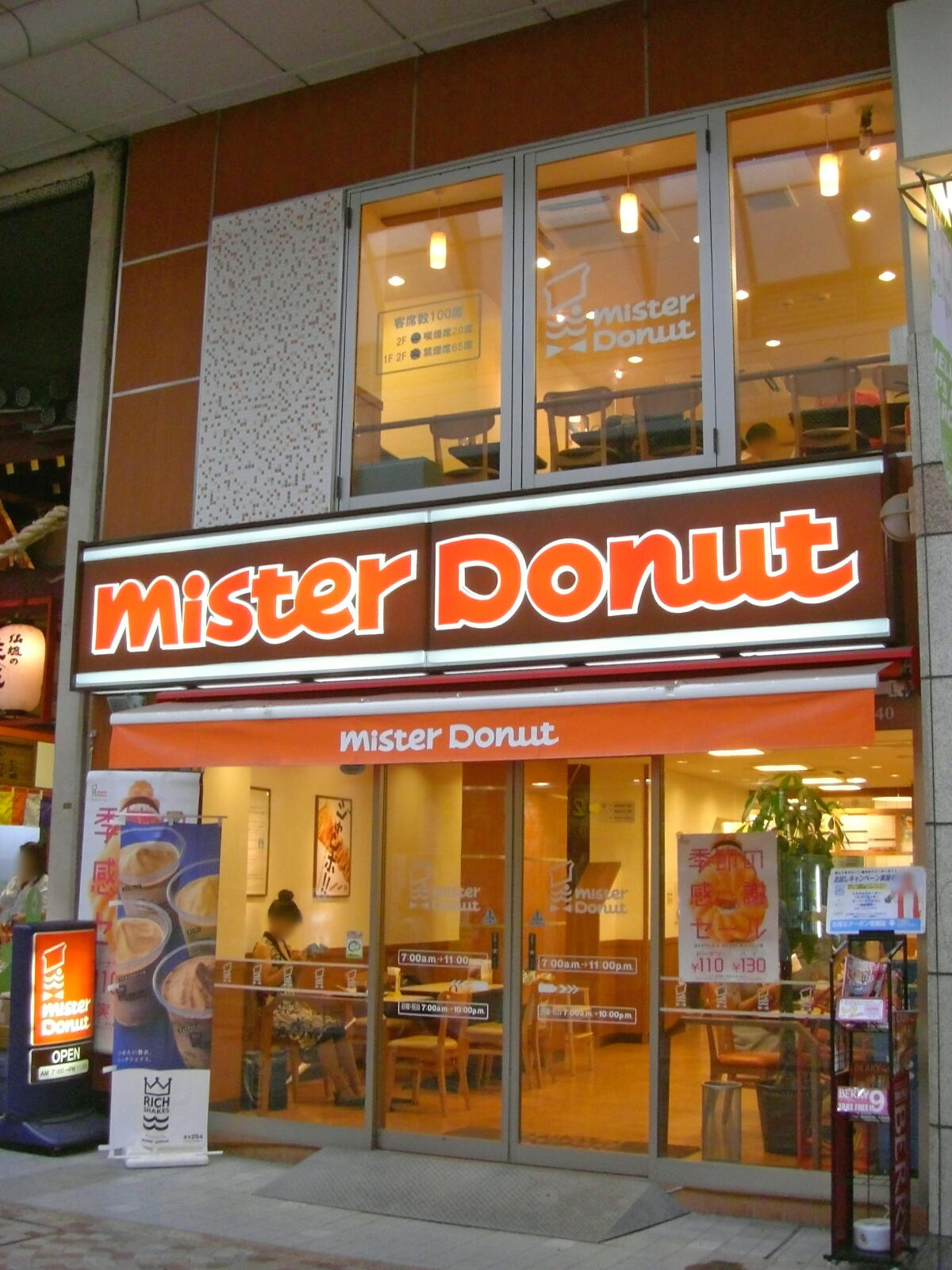
- Mister Donut store in Sendai, Japan
- Type: Subsidiary
- Industry: Food and beverage
- Founded: 1956; 70 years ago
- Founder: Harry Winokur
- Area served: United States, Hong Kong, Japan, Philippines, Thailand, Taiwan, Indonesia, Singapore, El Salvador, Middle East
- Products: Doughnuts, coffee, bagels
- Parent: International Multifoods Corporation (1970–1990); Allied Domecq (1990–2004); Dunkin' Brands (2004–2020); Inspire Brands (2020–present)

Mister Donut is an international chain of doughnut stores. Though founded in the United States in 1956 by Harry Winokur, it now primarily operates in Asia. The chain's offerings include doughnuts, coffee, muffins, and pastries. After being acquired by Allied Domecq in 1990, most of Mister Donut's North American stores became Dunkin' Donuts. Although it maintains a small presence in the United States, Mister Donut's main markets are Hong Kong, Japan, El Salvador, the Philippines, Thailand, Indonesia, Taiwan, and Singapore.

== History ==
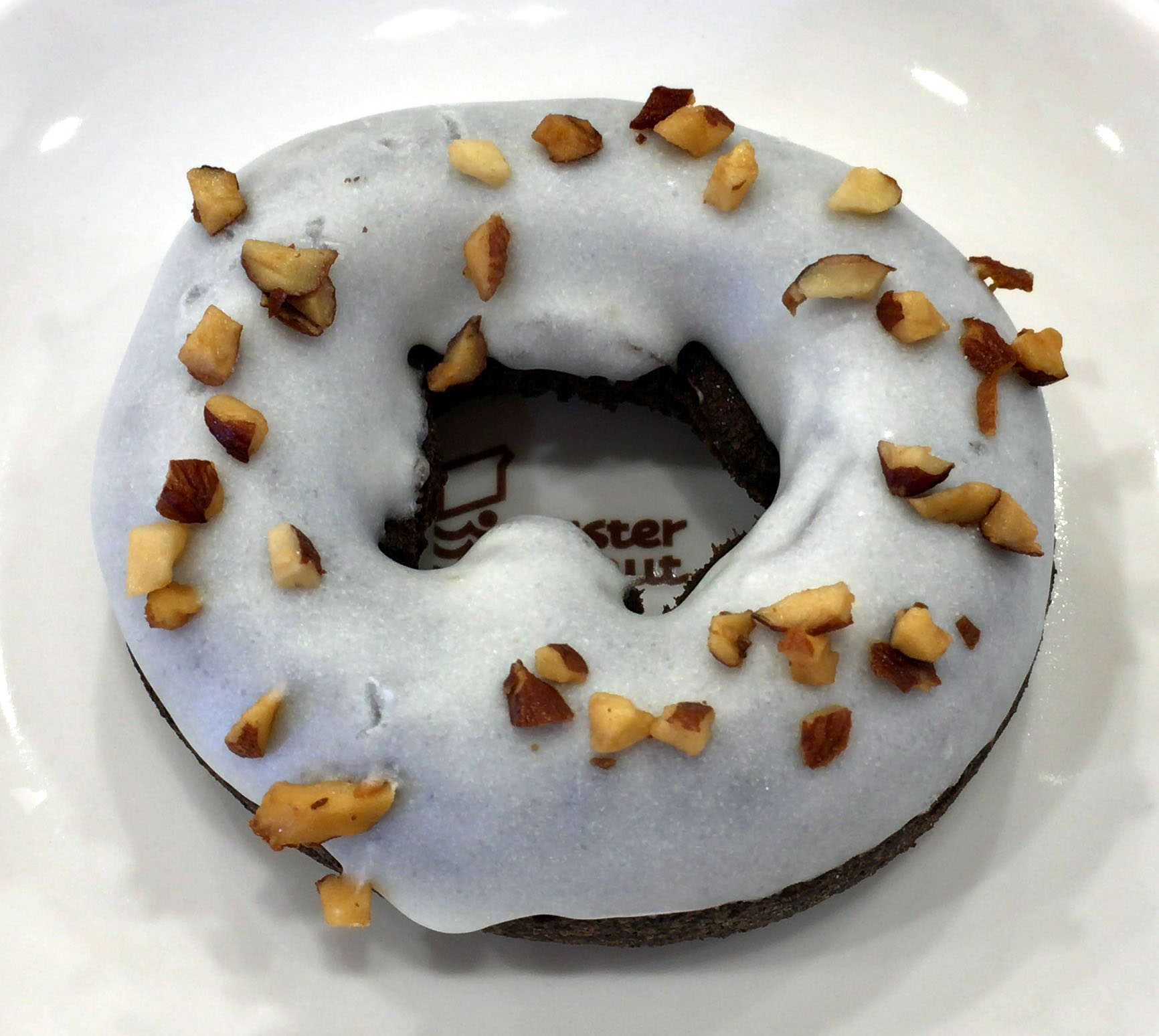
White chocolate and almond donut

In 1955, Harry Winokur worked with brother-in-law William Rosenberg, the founder of Dunkin' Donuts. After Winokur broke his partnership with Rosenberg, he went on to create Mister Donut with his son-in-law, David Slater that same year, with stores in most of North America. The Mister Donut business became so popular that Winokur and Slater decided to go into franchising. As a result, Mister Donut began a rapid expansion that resulted in the opening of 275 stores in the U.S. and Canada. In 1970, Minneapolis-based International Multifoods Corporation, one of the world's largest and most successful food companies, acquired Mister Donut and its franchising concept from Winokur.

The first Mister Donut outlet in Japan opened in Minoh, Osaka in 1971. Also in the same year, a Mister Donut training center was constructed in Japan. In 1973, the French cruller became available in Japanese stores. In 1978, brothers Sutthichai and Sutthikiat Chirathiwat, on behalf of Thai Franchise Co., Ltd, opened the first Mister Donut store in Siam Square, Bangkok. The two would come to pioneer the donut market within Thailand. In 2003, Mister Donut in Thailand came under the management of CRG. Donut Thailand (Central Restaurants Group) which continues to manage the company in Thailand. In 1983, Duskin Co., Ltd. of Osaka, Japan, acquired the rights to franchise Mister Donut throughout Japan and Asia.

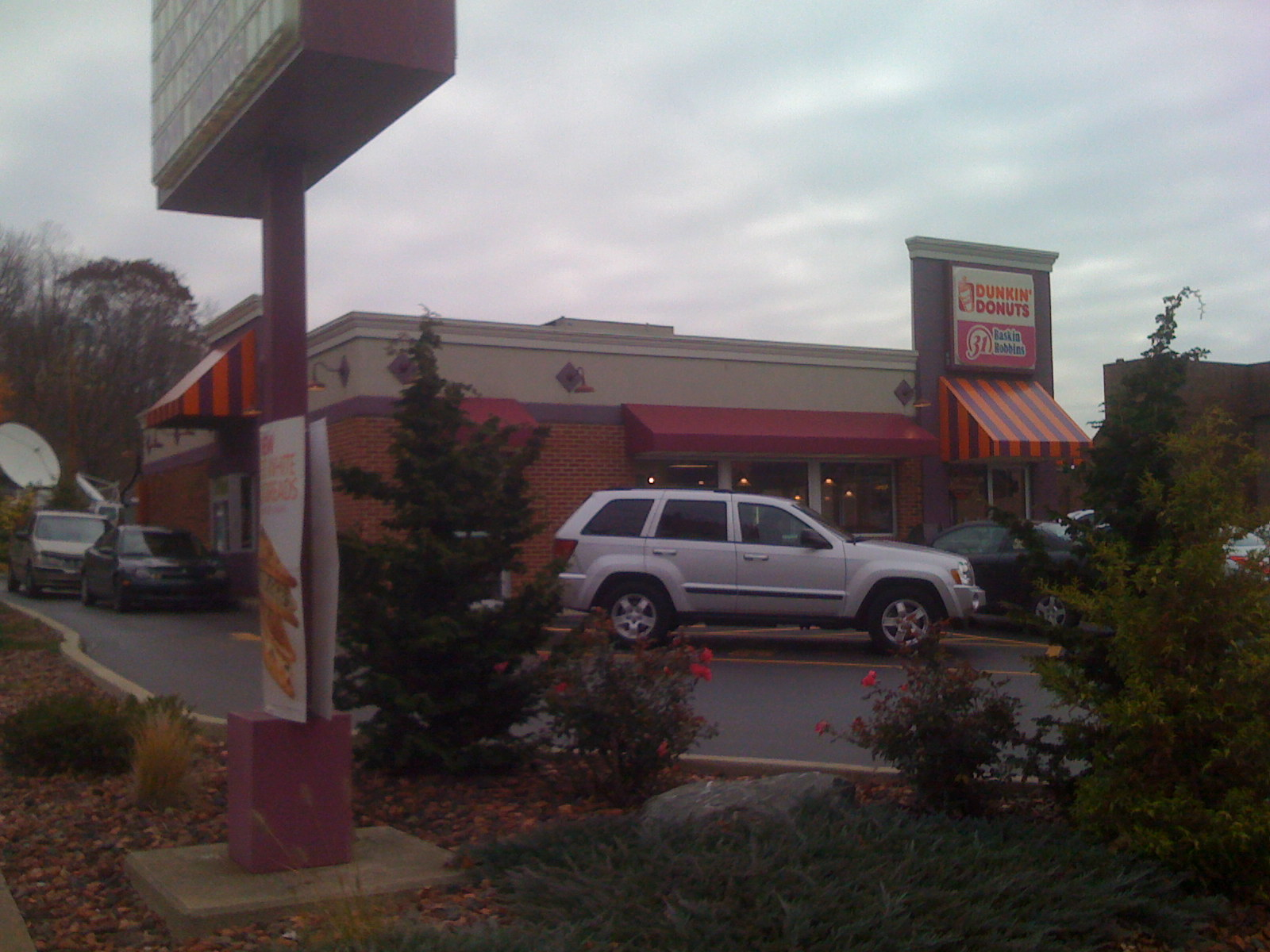
A former Mister Donut in New Castle, Pennsylvania, which became Dunkin' Donuts in 1994. It was rebuilt in 2003, with a Baskin-Robbins and a drive-thru added.

In the 1980s, Mister Donut was the largest competitor to Dunkin'. On March 31, 1987, Elie G. Saheb and his business associates acquired the trademark rights for Mister Donut in the United Kingdom and afterwards opened a Mister Donut pilot store and bakery in Fulham, London. On May 2, 1988, the Mister Donut franchise sold the trademark rights for the European market at large.

By the 1980s, Mister Donut had over 550 stores in the United States and Canada. In 1989, the British corporate giant Allied-Lyons plc acquired Dunkin' Donuts from Rosenberg for a reported £196 million. After becoming a subsidiary of Allied-Lyons, Dunkin' Donuts immediately acquired Mister Donut from International Multifoods. Mister Donut stores were offered the option to convert to Dunkin', while all remaining Mister Donut franchises in the rest of the world started being operated on their own such as in Japan and El Salvador. Mister Donut sold its Middle East trademarks on October 14, 1995.

In July 2005, Allied-Lyons was acquired by Pernod Ricard SA. On December 12, 2005, Pernod Ricard announced that it had agreed to sell Dunkin' Brands, which owned Dunkin' and Mister Donut, to a consortium of three US private equity firms (Thomas H. Lee Partners, the Carlyle Group and Bain Capital LLP) for US$2.43 billion. The closing of the sale occurred on March 1, 2006. In August 2012, Dunkin' Brands became completely independent of the private equity firms.

As of 2017, only one Mister Donut store remains in the United States, in Godfrey, Illinois (outside of St. Louis), while there were 10,000 stores worldwide. As of 2016, Mister Donut Japan had over "1,300 stores, making it the largest donut chain in the country." and as of June 2016, Duskin Co., Ltd. was also operating Mister Donut stores in China, Taiwan, South Korea, Thailand, the Philippines, Indonesia, Japan, and Malaysia.

In 2020, Dunkin' Brands was purchased by Sandy Springs-based Inspire Brands, and Mister Donut's trademark management became part of Inspire.

== Marketing presence ==
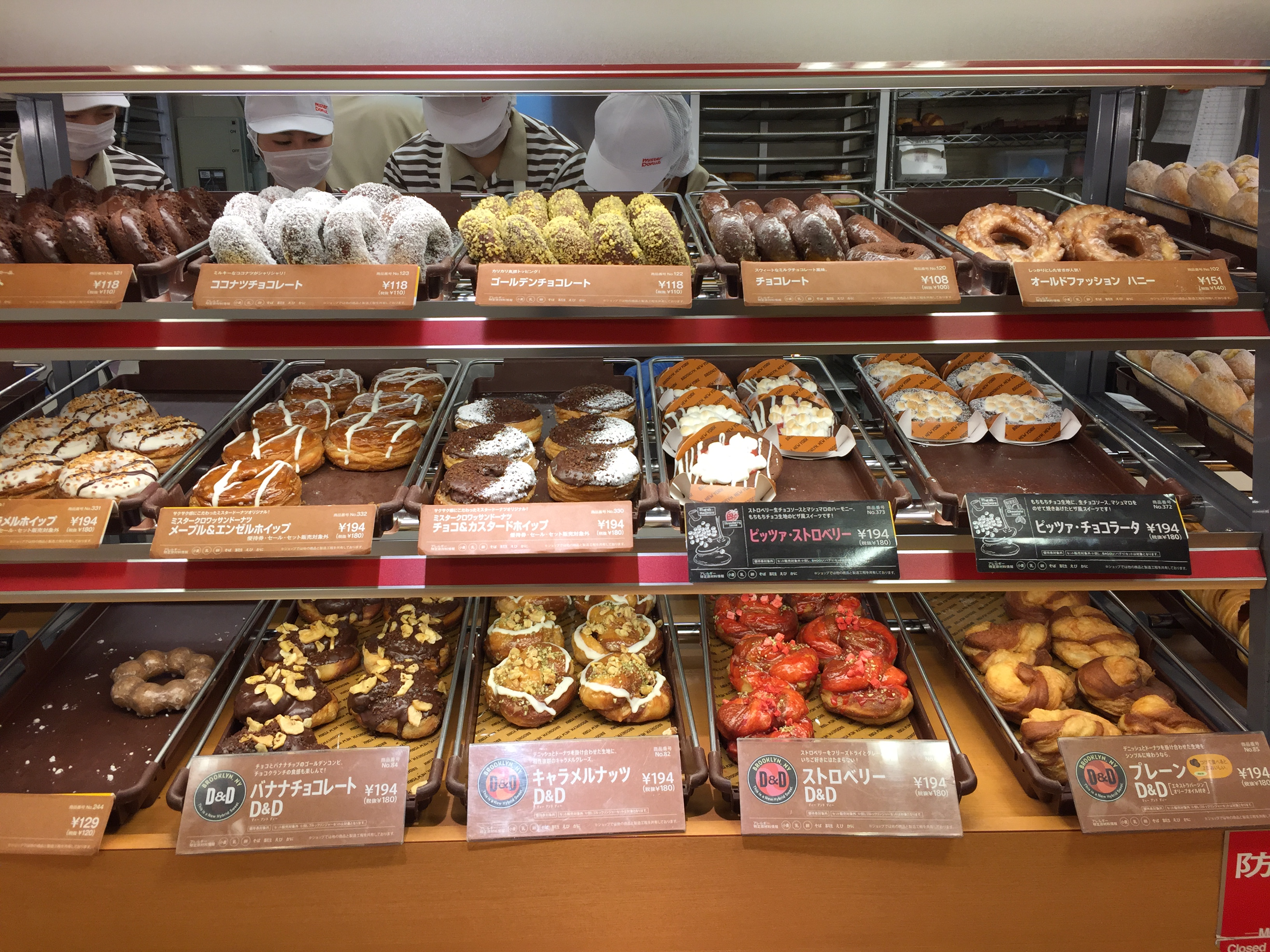
A Mister Donut shop in Asahikawa, Hokkaido

Mister Donut has an orange and white logo in the likeness of a moustachioed chef. More recently, the chain developed a set of mascot characters based on its donuts. One character, "Pon de Lion" (ポン・デ・ライオン, Pon De Raion), a lion with a mane shaped like its "pon de ring" (ポン・デ・リング, Pon De Ringu) donut line, is used in Japan.

In El Salvador, the mascots are five anthropomorphic doughnuts and a rooster that is used for the breakfast menu. The company uses the same logo as Japan, and the slogan is "La gran variedad" (The great variety).

== Global stores ==
=== Asia ===
The Mister Donut brand operates in Hong Kong, Japan, the Philippines, Thailand, Taiwan, Indonesia, and Singapore.

==== China ====
In China, Mister Donut closed down in 2019 after nearly 20 years of operations due to high operational costs and high labor costs. Ten outlets in Shanghai closed in April 2019.

==== Hong Kong ====
The first Mister Donut store in Hong Kong opened in Tsim Sha Tsui on October 26, 2024, through franchisee Dragon Circle Enterprise.

==== Indonesia ====
In Indonesia, Mister Donut is operated under management of Indomaret, a subsidiary of Salim Group. The first store was opened in 2015, with 7 standalone outlets and 1,350 stands inside Indomaret outlets, mostly located in the city center, malls, airports, rail stations, or shop-in-shops at every Indomaret outlet.

==== Japan ====
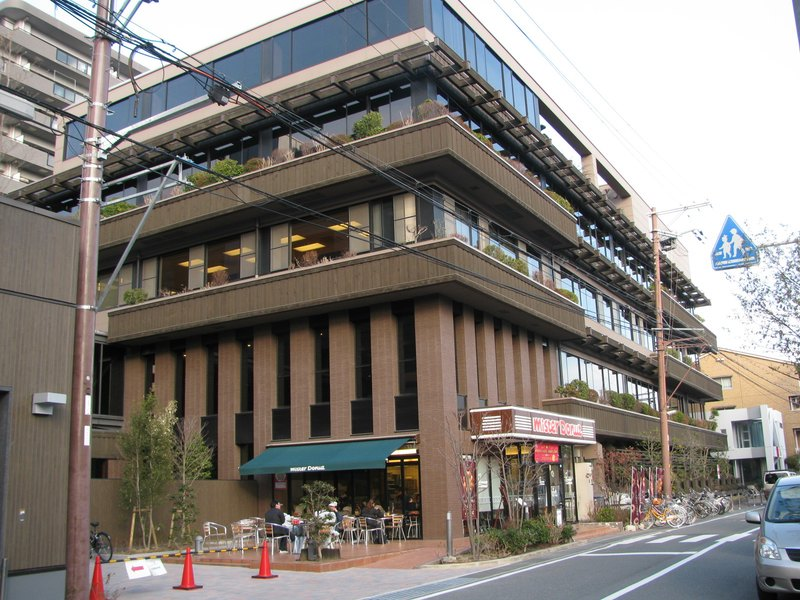
Japanese headquarters in Osaka

In Japan, the Mister Donut franchise is owned by Duskin Co., Ltd., a part of the Mitsui conglomerate. Mister Donut is the largest donut franchise chain in Japan, with a total of 961 retail shops operating as of March 2021. Keiji Chiba, who was Duskin Company's general manager and director of food industries, adjusted the recipes and gave a higher class image so the company would be successful in the Japanese market. Before the introduction of Mister Donut, the Japanese perceived doughnuts as being snacks for children.

The Star wrote in 2007 that "Mister Donut has gained a following among mostly younger Japanese for its American-style doughnuts, decor and music, becoming the country's biggest donut chain." On September 13, 2013, a survey by the Japanese retail research company, Softbrain Field, surveyed close to 6000 Japanese citizens of all ages on their favorite fast food restaurant. Mister Donut came in third, at 17%, behind McDonald's at 33% and MOS Burger at 25%.

==== Philippines ====
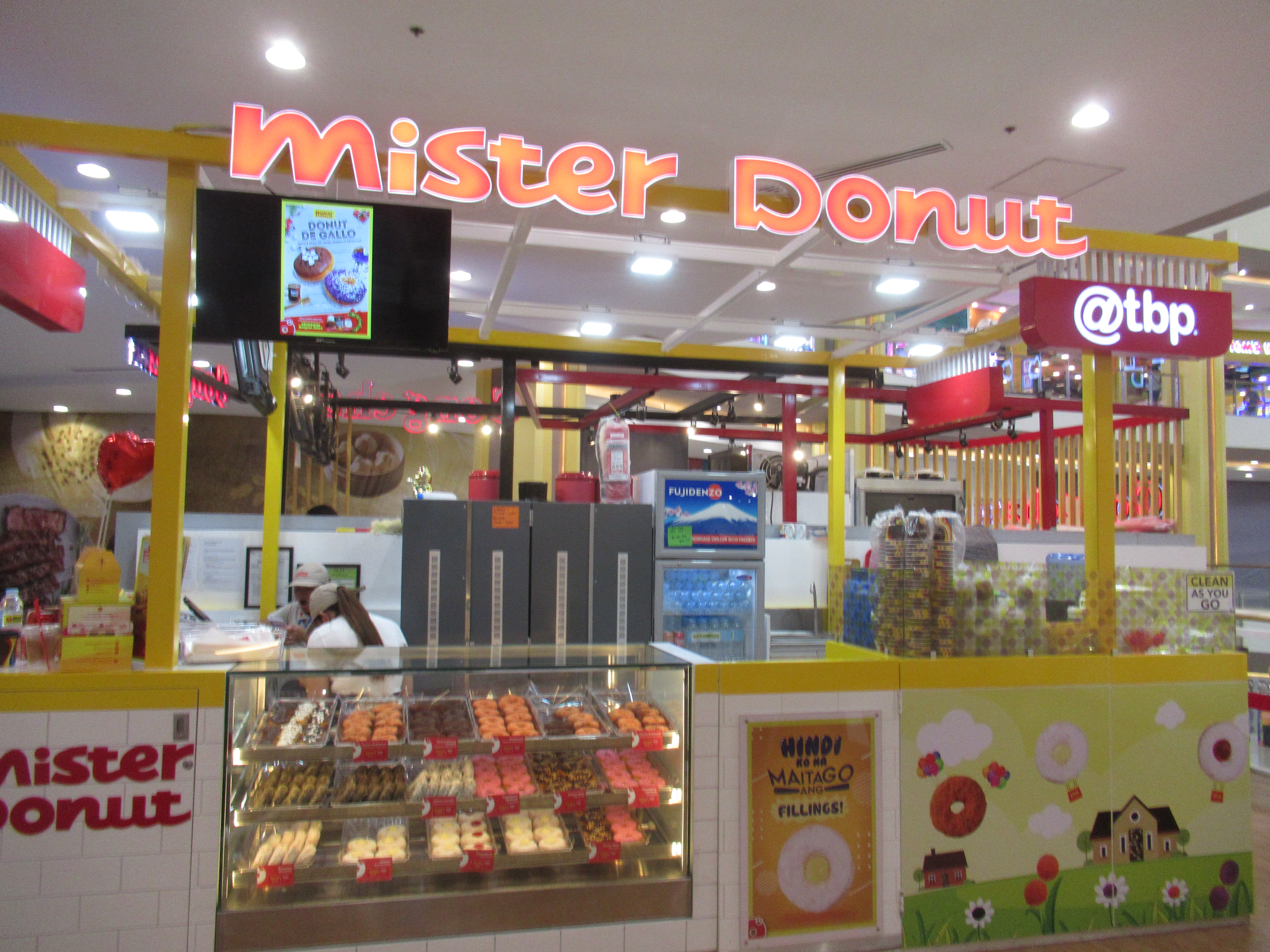
Mister Donut in Gapan, Nueva Ecija, Philippines

In the Philippines, the first Mister Donut store opened in 1982 in Manila and has become the country's second largest doughnut chain, with Dunkin' Donuts as its main competitor. In 1995, the Ramcar Group took over the Philippine franchise of Mister Donut through its subsidiary, Food Fest, Inc. In 1997, Mister Donut helped finance the country's first ever feature-length animated film, Adarna: The Mythical Bird.

Of its 1,800 outlets, the majority are stalls, often located inside shopping malls, while 200 are full-scale stores. Mister Donut products are also sold in 7-Eleven stores and KFC restaurants, the latter also franchised locally by Ramcar. Some locations sell coffee, but they mostly focus on doughnuts, including pasalubong, gifts by visitors to friends and family. The doughnuts sold are adjusted to suit the local market, with smaller sizes, therefore cheaper, and different flavors.

==== Singapore ====
In May 2023, Mister Donut opened its first outlet at Junction 8 in Singapore after a successful market test in August 2022.

==== South Korea ====
Mister Donut briefly entered the South Korean market in July 2014 through a franchise agreement with SDK2, owned by local construction company SDK. The contract was terminated due to the SDK violating franchise contracts and "selling products that were not on the brand's official menu". SDK reportedly closed its stores in 2017.

==== Taiwan ====
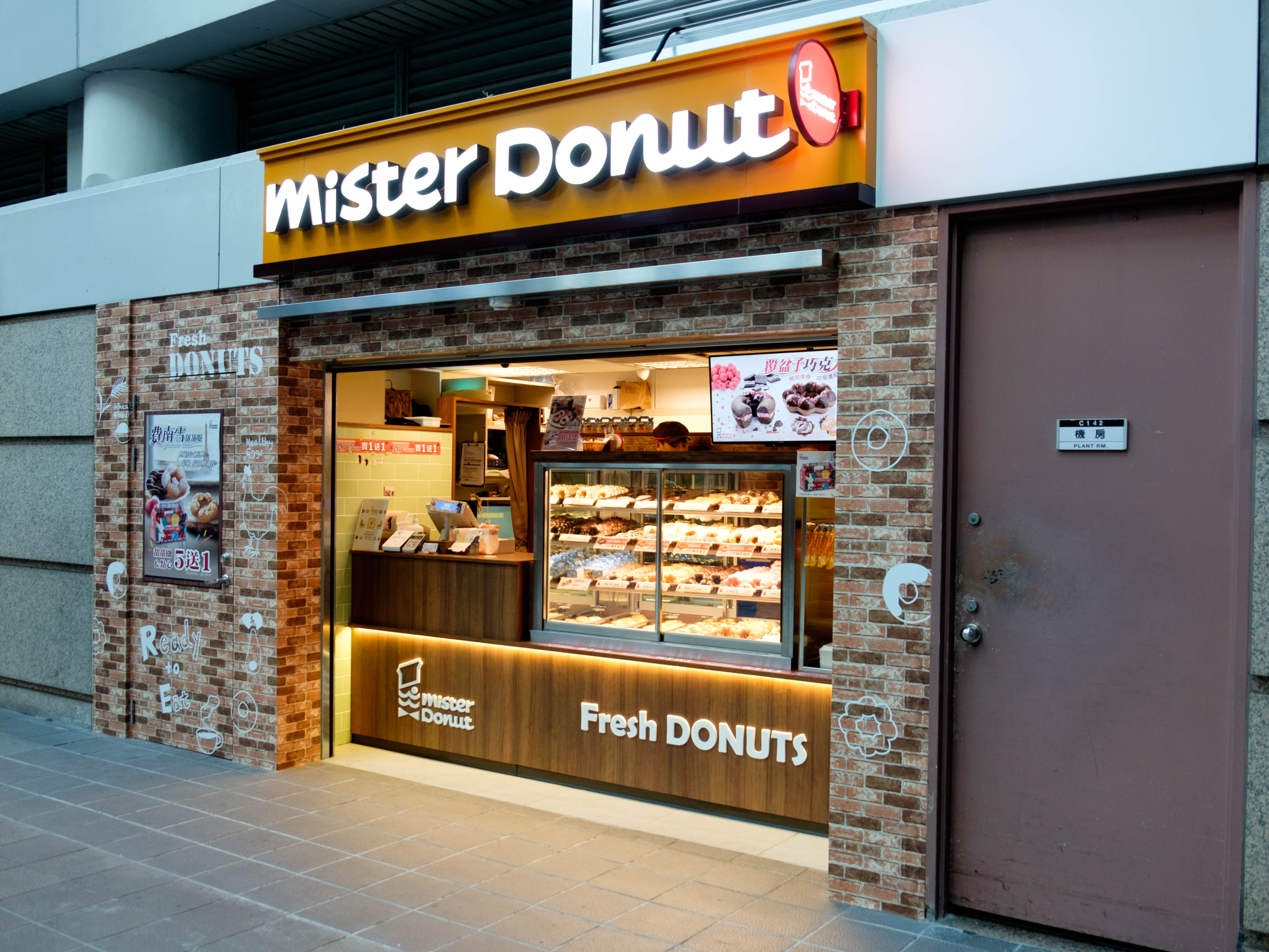
Mister Donut in Taipei, Taiwan

In 2004, the Uni-President Group introduced Mister Donut in Taiwan through the newly established joint-venture Mister Donut Taiwan Corp., announcing a goal to open 100 outlets in Taiwan in three years.

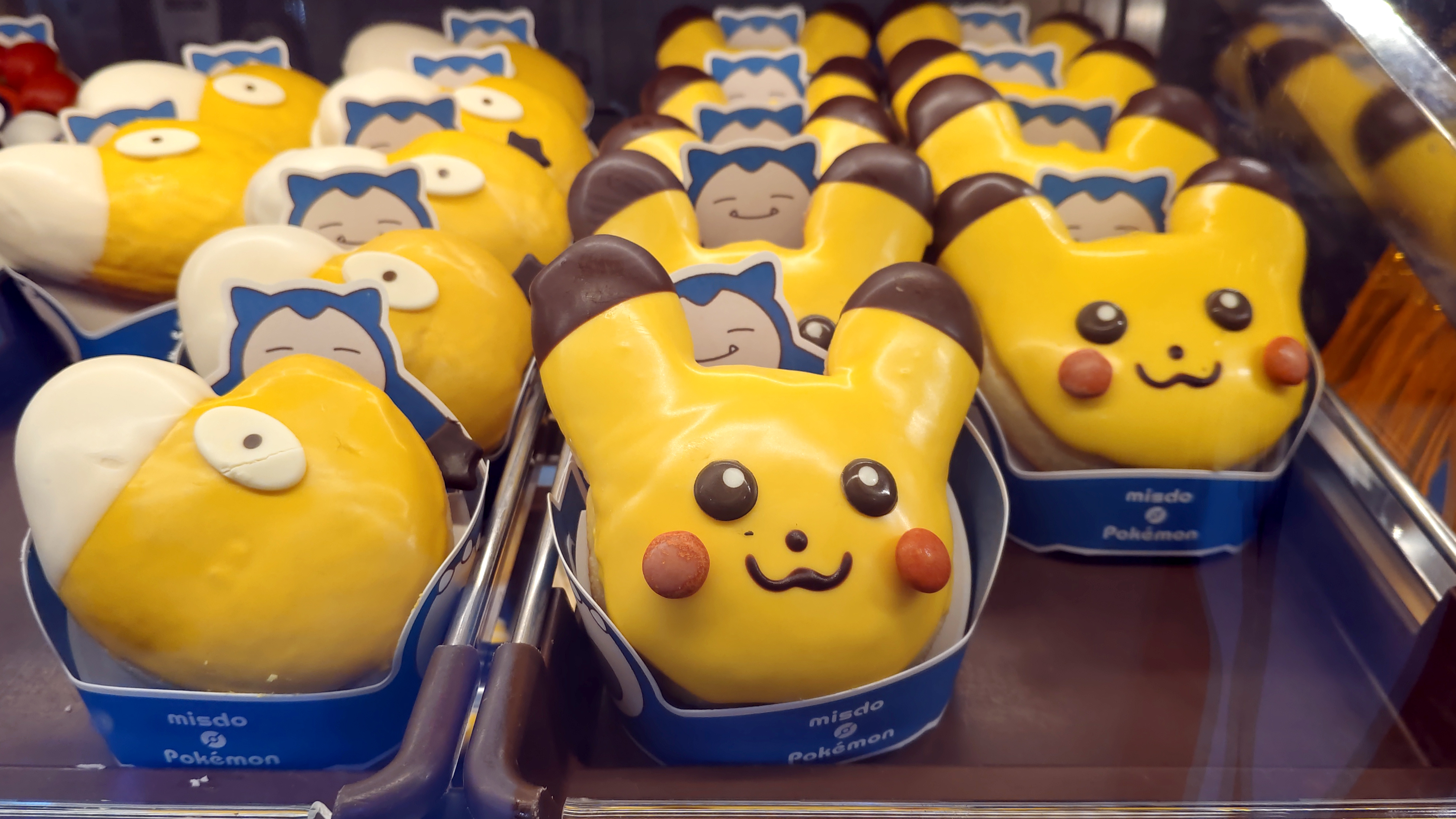
Limited-edition Pokémon-themed donuts from Mister Donut, Kaohsiung

==== Thailand ====
In Thailand, Mister Donut has been a leader in the Thai donut market since 1978 and uses the slogan "Donut for Fun". As of December 2011, Thailand was the "largest market outside Japan for Mister Donut in terms of sales volume." Mister Donut has more than 320 branches across Thailand with more opening yearly. They include stand-alone stores as well as branches at shopping malls and supermarkets. In 2014, donut consumption increased 10 and 15 per cent in Thailand, with Mister Donut accounting for half of that increase. In 2015, Thailand's Central Restaurants Group announced plans to open 30 new outlets in 2015, bringing its store number to 350. The company stated that it would be able to sell "its doughnuts in all 77 provinces by year end." Central has also stated it is considering expanding Mister Donut in Malaysia, the Philippines, and Indonesia.

==== Vietnam ====
In May 2016, plans were announced for Mister Donut stores to open in Vietnam through Central Restaurants Group (CRG).

=== Europe and Middle East ===
On March 31, 1987, Elie G. Saheb and associates acquired the Mister Donut trademark rights for the United Kingdom and opened the first Mister Donut bakery and pilot shop in Fulham, London. The trademark rights for the European markets were acquired on May 2, 1988, and for the Middle East region on October 14, 1995.

=== The Americas ===
==== United States ====
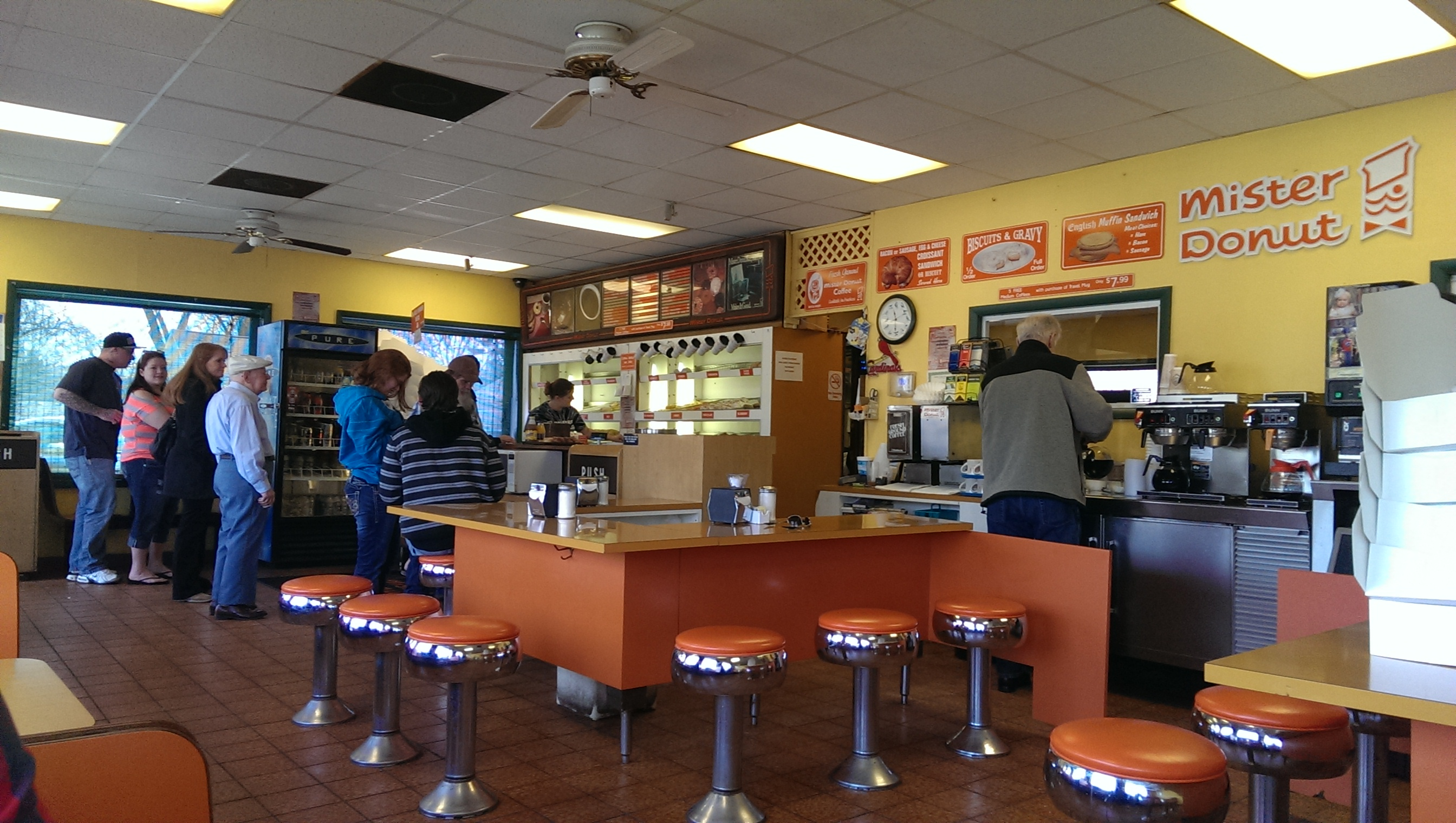
Interior of the sole Mister Donut store in the United States, located at 2720 Grovelin Street, Godfrey, Illinois

After Mister Donut was acquired by Dunkin' Donuts in 1990, most stores either closed or became Dunkin' Donuts.

There were nine outlets in the Pennsylvania and Ohio region that remained Mister Donut, mostly due to being close to existing Dunkin' Donuts stores. Their owners formed a cooperative to continue receiving bulk pricing on materials. As of May 2006, these stores rebranded as Donut Connection, serving the same items as Mister Donut. Some locations of the Donut Connection partnership have retained the original fixtures of the original Mister Donut location, such as the outlet in Shakopee, Minnesota, which still has the orange motif and original Mister Donut price board. Most of the stores, while located in areas where Dunkin' remains prominent, also compete with Starbucks and (largely through grocer distribution) Krispy Kreme alongside mom-and-pop shops, but largely do not overlap with Tim Hortons.

Only one store located in 2720 Grovelin Street, Godfrey, Illinois, continues to operate as Mister Donut.

==== Canada ====
Mister Donut operations downsized in the late 1990s, and the final surviving three in the Toronto, Ontario area closed quietly around or prior to June 2006.

==== El Salvador ====
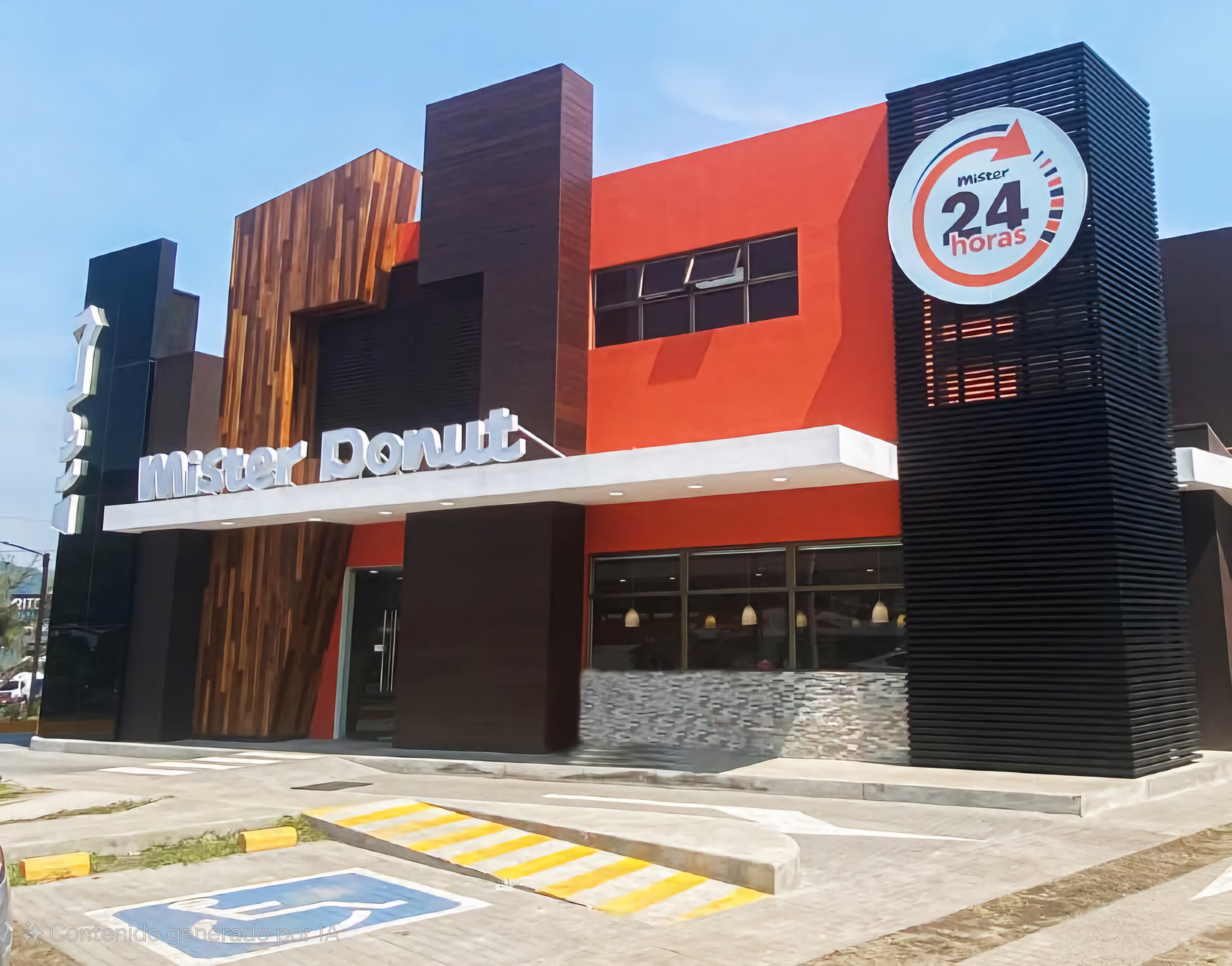
Mister Donut in Santa Rosa, Santa Tecla

In El Salvador, Mister Donut has a large cultural presence as the menu includes traditional Salvadoran cuisine and is known for its famous 2X1 promotion during September. It has sponsored local football teams such as CD Águila and Alianza F.C. which are major football teams in the country. As of 2026, there are 24 Mister Donut stores in the country, with a few offering 24-hour service. The rights are held by Sistemas Comestibles.

== Menu ==
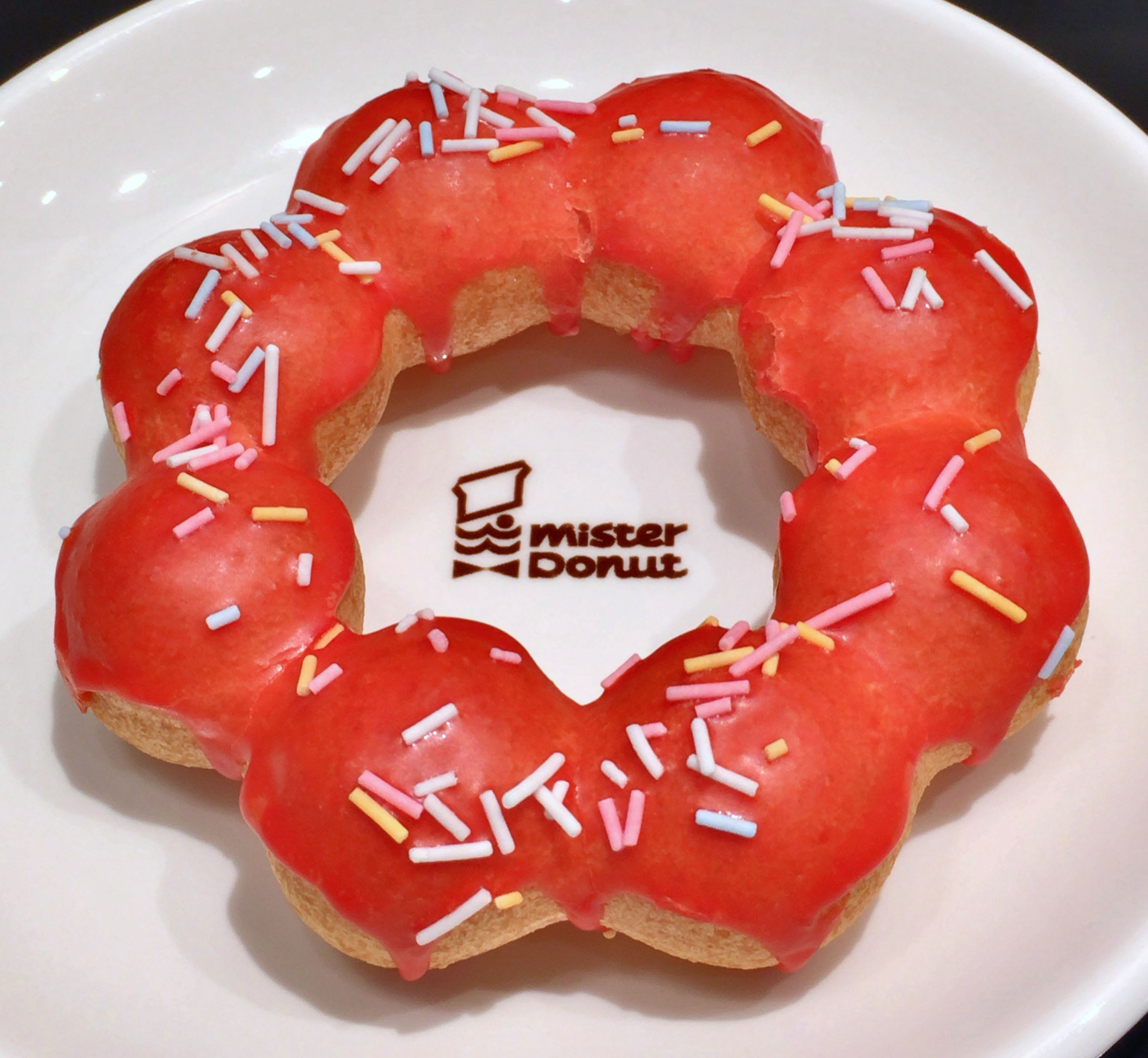
Strawberry mochi donut

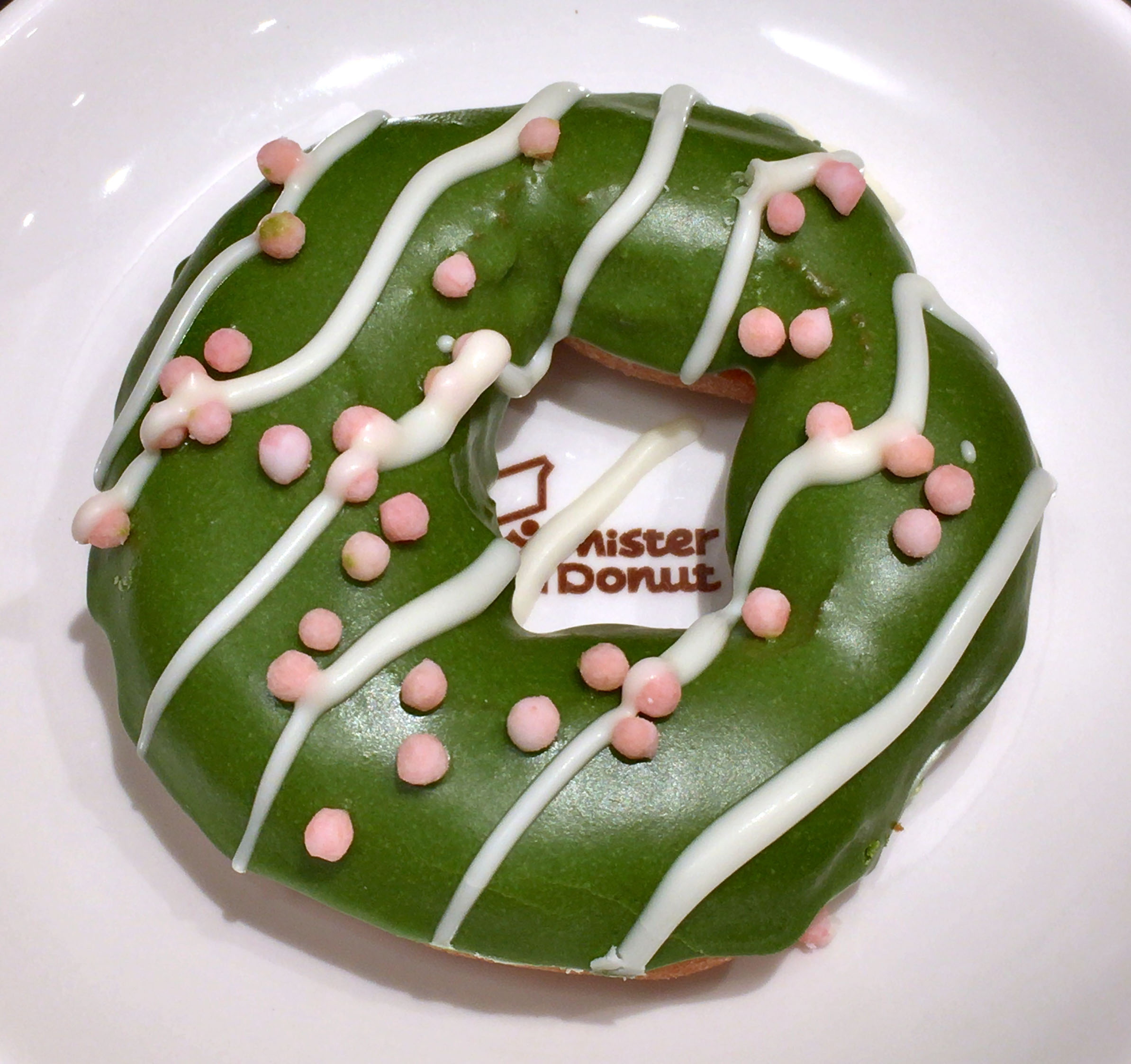
Matcha mochi donut

Mister Donut specializes in coffee and doughnuts. However, it also serves a wide variety of other foods, such as hamburgers and noodle soups.

As of 2004, the first Mister Donut shop opened in Taiwan, featuring "doughnuts in 50 different flavors every day. Each flavor comes with a label indicating the level of sweetness." The store also sold around 15 kinds of drinks and beverages.

In 2007, Mister Donut attracted media attention in Japan when it admitted it had used out-of-date syrups in some of its drinks earlier that year.

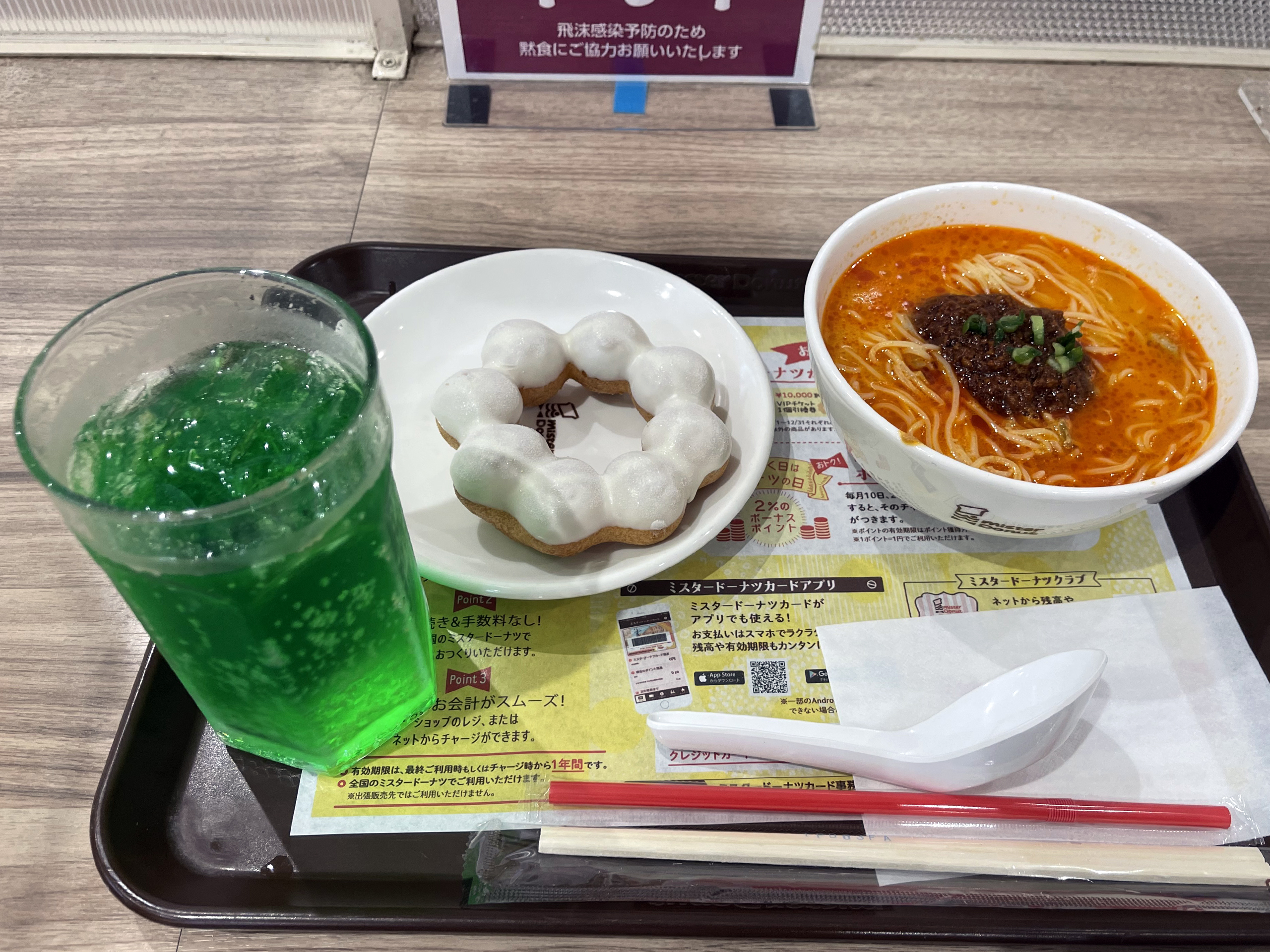
In addition to donuts, the chain also serves other foods like Dandan noodles.

The company has created special donut lines for various events, for example, creating soldier-themed doughnuts for National Doughnut Day on June 1 in Thailand, with funds benefitting military personnel in the country.

In June 2013, Mister Donut in Thailand debuted the SushiDo, sushi-themed donuts created as a part of "a special sushi-themed menu." At the time, they had not been added to the menu in Japan or other countries. Options included "sweet donut versions of ebi, tamago, maguro, salmon, with sugary frosting replacing raw fish." For Halloween 2013, Mister Donut introduced Hello Kitty jack-o'-lantern doughnuts in pumpkin or strawberry flavors, as well as other seasonal pumpkin-flavored items, including pumpkin versions of their regular donut.

As of 2014, the stores in El Salvador focused on a menu described as more "homey than foreign, offering national staples like pupusas and tamales alongside giant cream-filled doughnuts."

There have also been items such as strawberry-glaze donuts.

In April 2014, the company launched a croissant-style doughnut, which proved popular.

On May 27, 2014, Mister Donut collaborated with the Japanese fast food franchise Mos Burger on the MOSDO!, a burger using "a spiral-shaped chorizo, lettuce and spicy chili sauce sandwiched between Mister Donut's French Cruller donut as the buns." The menu item was released at Mos Burger stores, while Mister Donut stores at the time were selling "Mos Burger's famous rice burger with sweet bean paste, sweet potato paste, and custard cream stuffing."

In April 2015, Mister Donut released new items such as the "Brooklyn Merry-Go-Round, which uses both cookie and bagel dough." At the time, the company announced that it would "launch new key products quarterly while maintaining its standard menu."

In 2015, Japan revealed a summer doughnut menu themed to Brooklyn, New York. Japan Times explained that the menu was "'Brooklyn themed' in the sense it combines several foodstuffs into one, in the style of New York-born fusion treats such as the Cronut." Items included "berry or lemon doughnuts cut in half, with a layer of yogurt added to the middle, or a chocolate option with sugary cream in the center."

As of May 2016, "some 80% of the menu at Mister Donut bakery and cafe is made up of coffee drinks and the rest is doughnuts."

In Japan, current items as of July 2016 may include the old-fashioned doughnuts covered in chocolate or cinnamon-flavored. There is also a "chocolate almond croissant muffin," a salty donut, a chocolate-covered churro, a financier donut, and a Japanese-style matcha kuromitsu stick.

In Japan, Mister Donut's "signature" is the "Pon de Ringu, with its cartoon lion mascot." The Japanese stores also sell the "pon de ring, Mister Donut's signature item that's made of a connected circle of dough balls." Pon de ring varieties include the pon de angel, which is cream-filled, and the pon de kokuto, or a pon de ring with brown sugar.

== In media ==
The 1998 album Good Humor by English indie pop band Saint Etienne features a song titled "Mr. Donut", which was inspired by their visit to one of the chain's cafés while on tour in Japan.

== Gallery ==
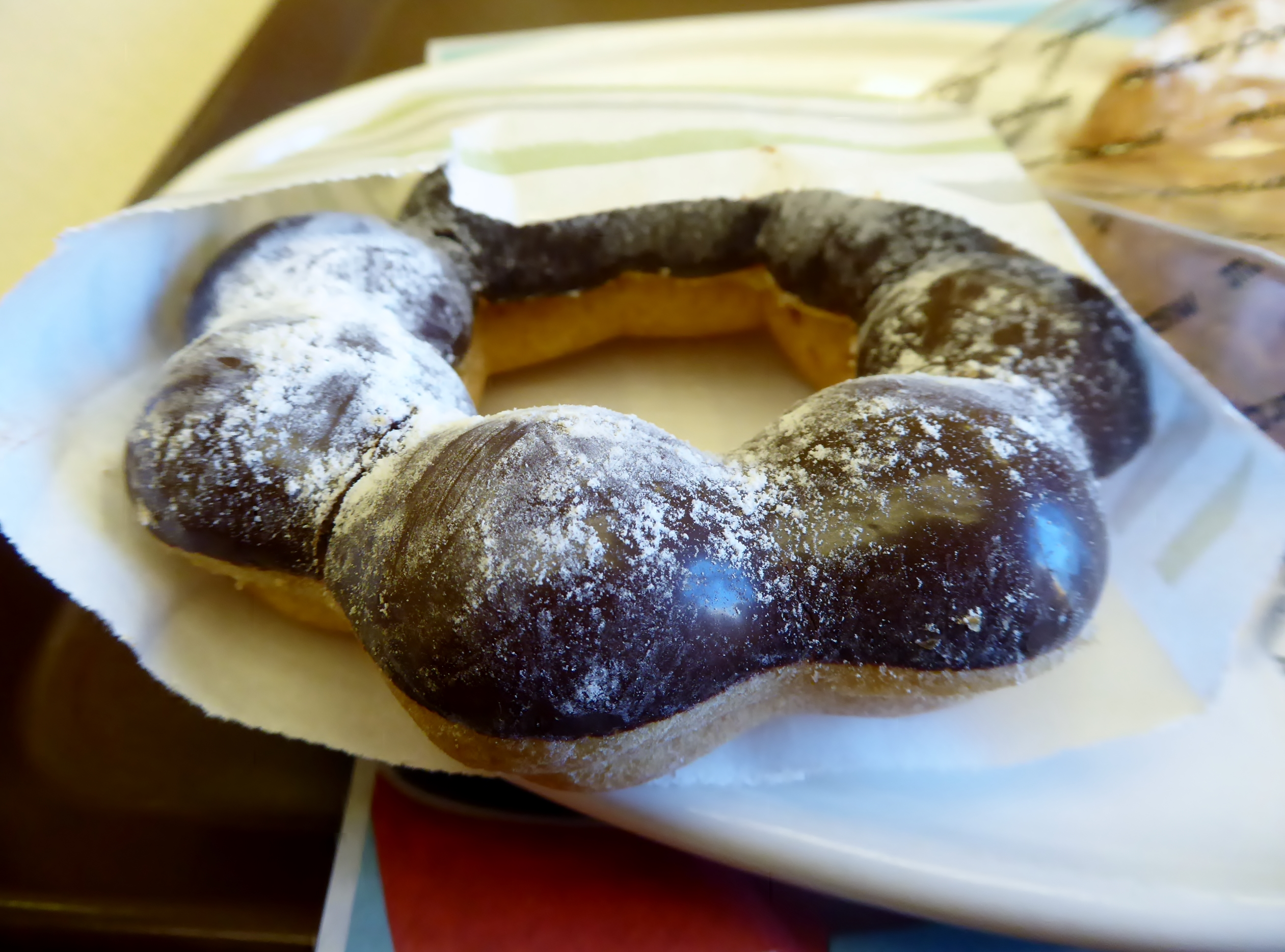
Pon de Eclair

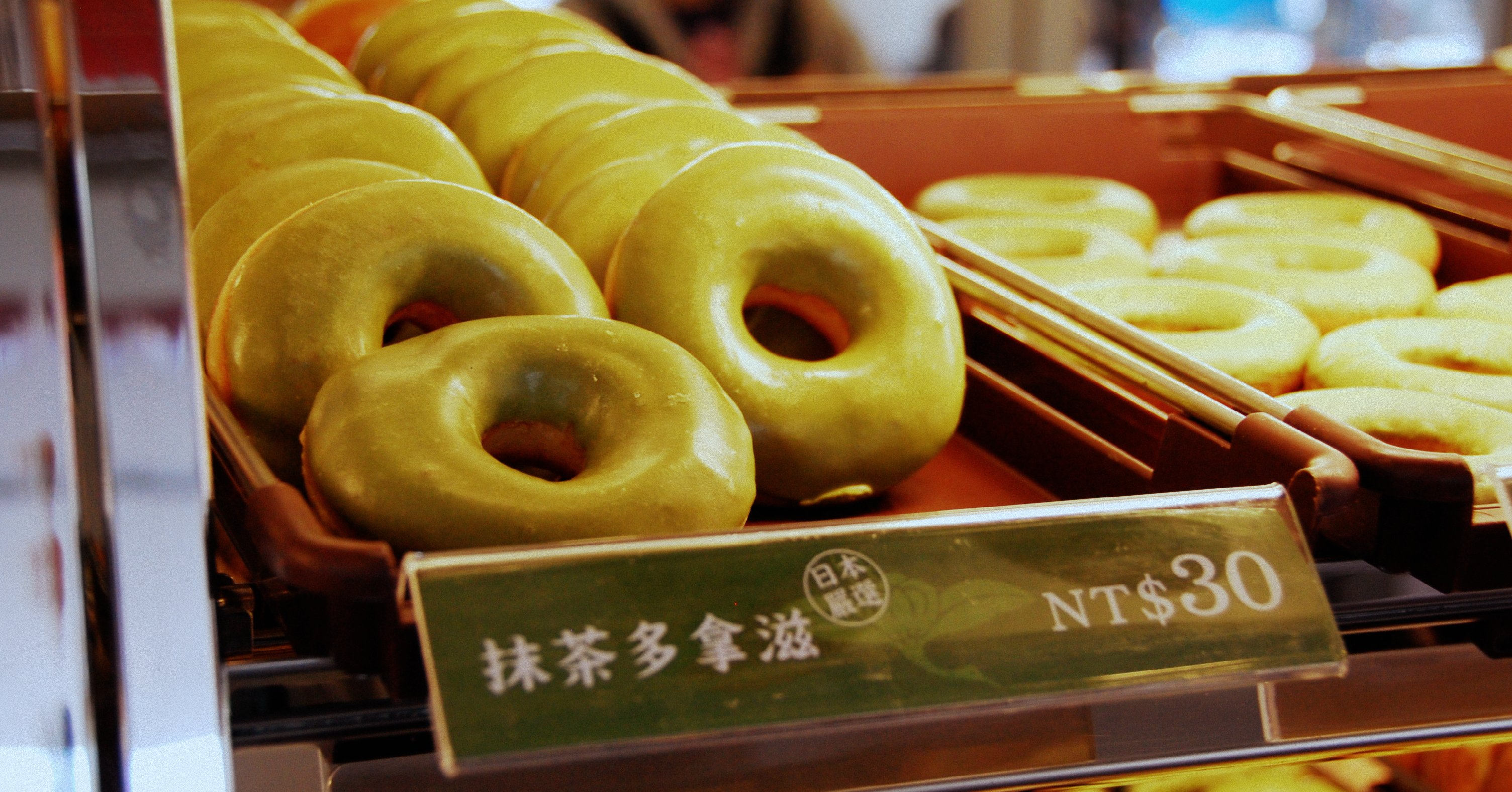
Green tea donuts

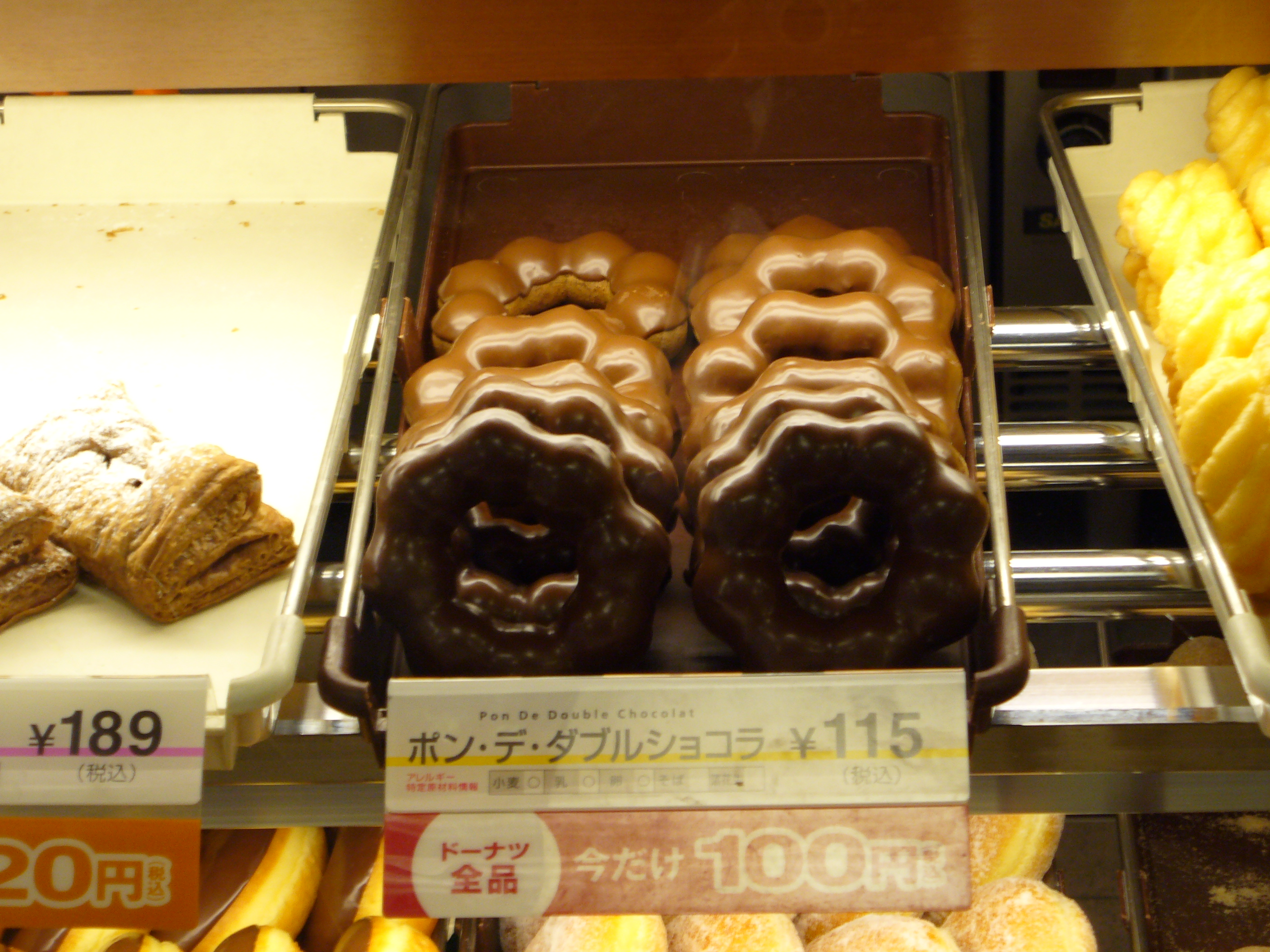
Chocolate donuts

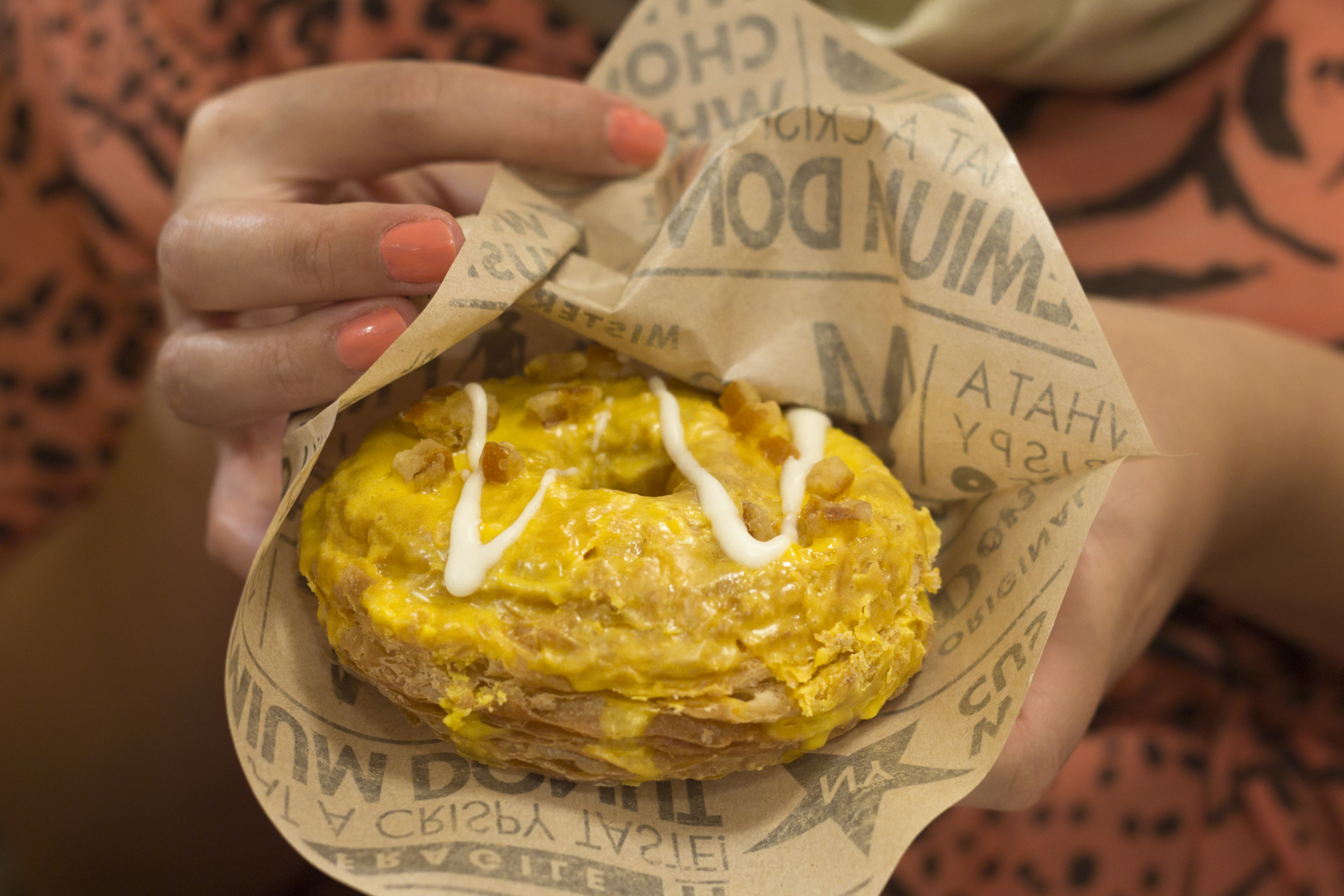
"Mister Croissant Donut", a cronut-inspired donut in Japan

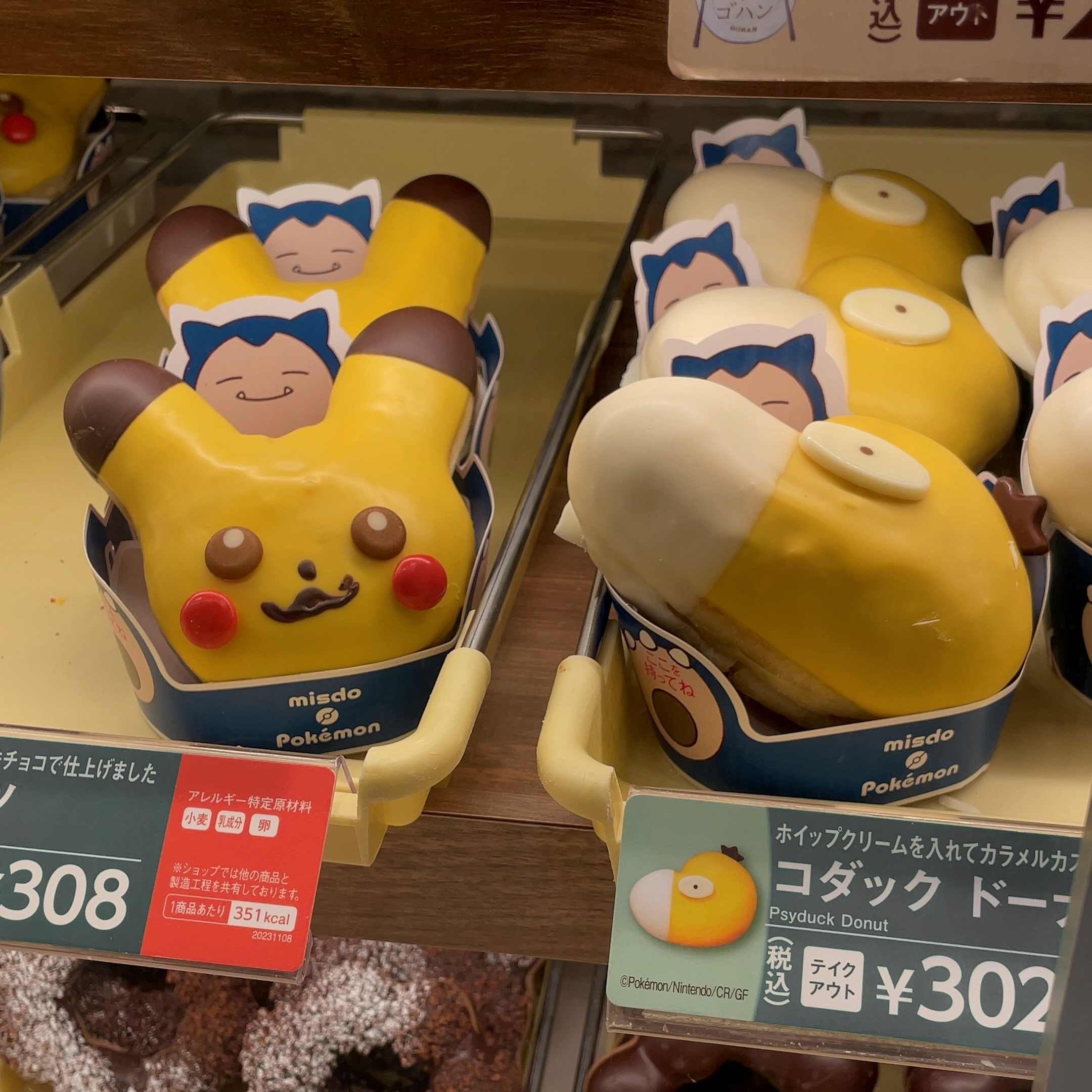
Pokémon-themed donuts

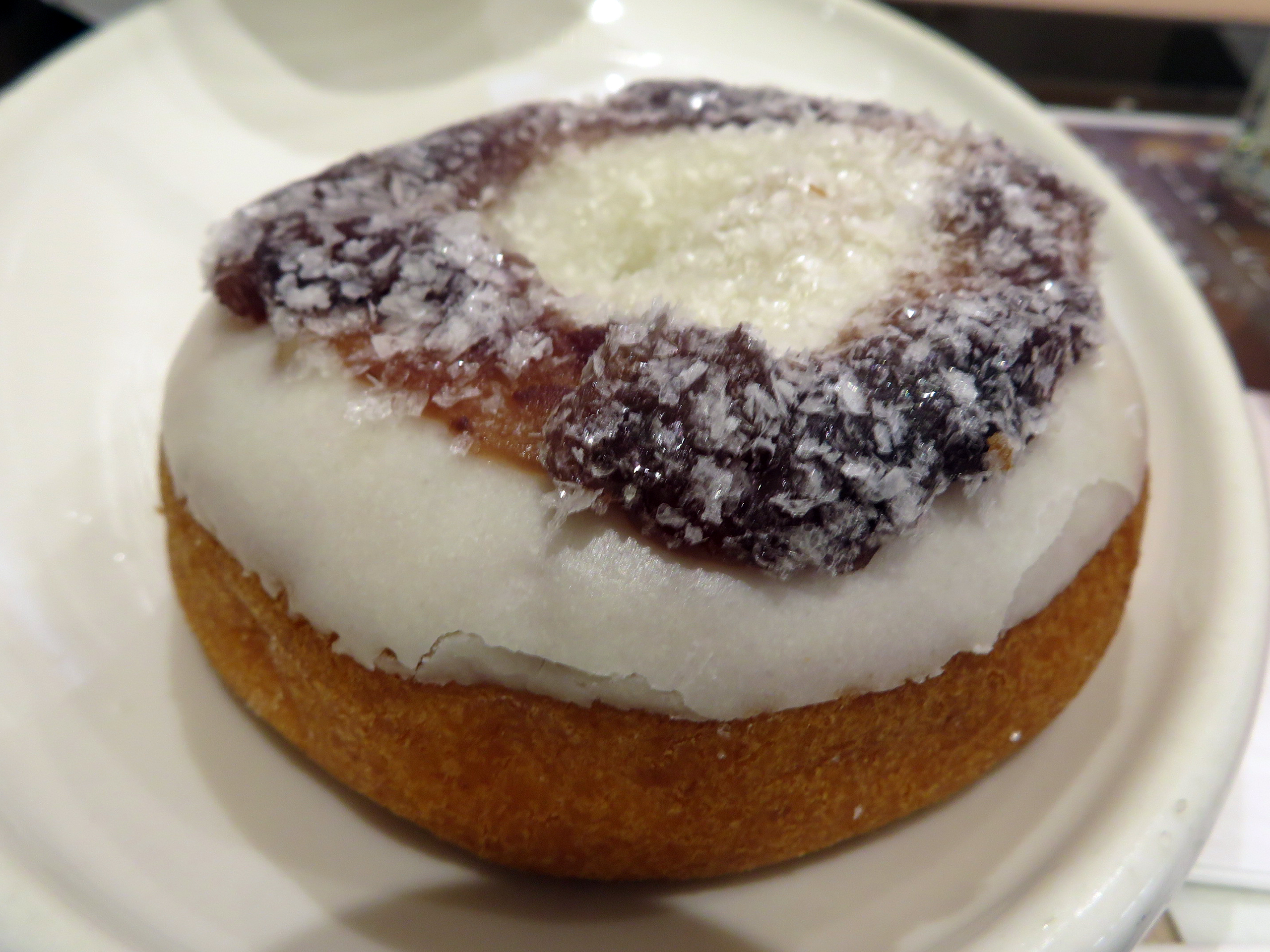
Red bean mochi-flavored donut

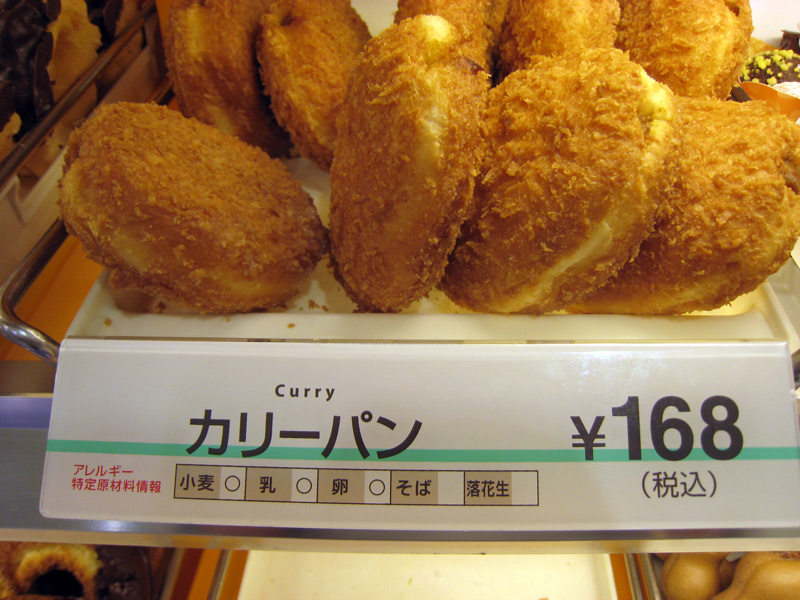
Curry-filled donuts in Japan

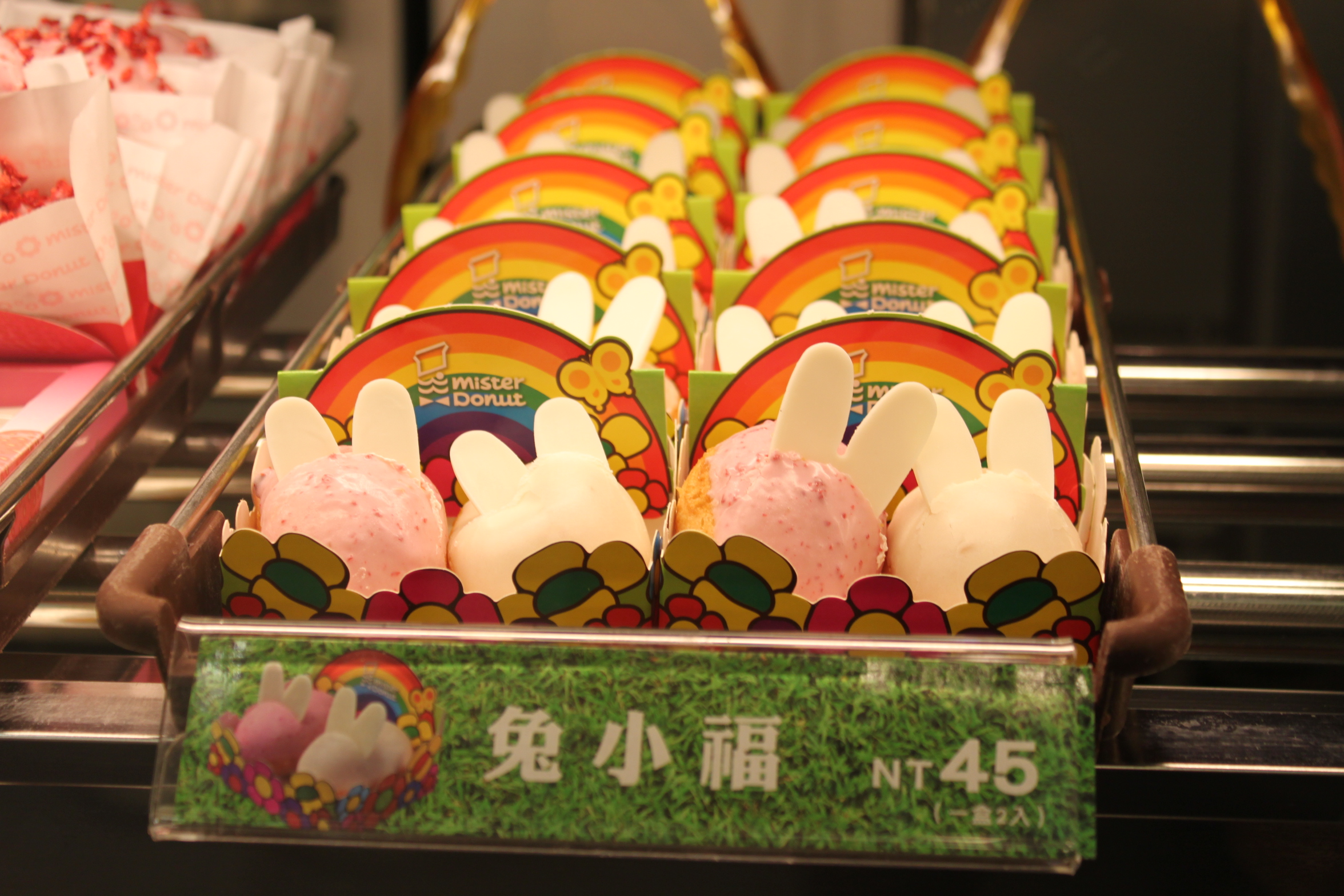
Glazed donuts shaped like rabbits

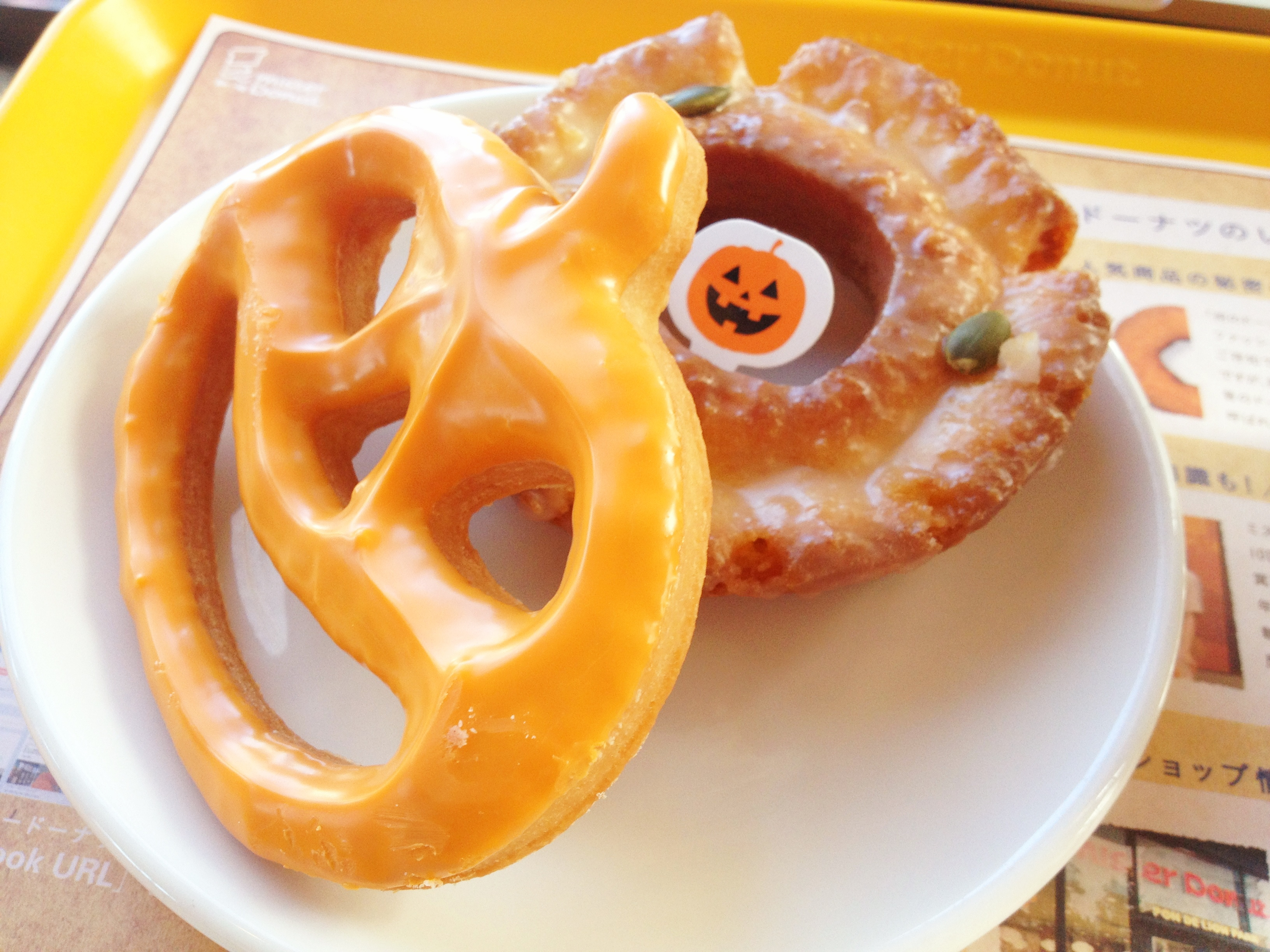
Halloween themed donuts

Other foods

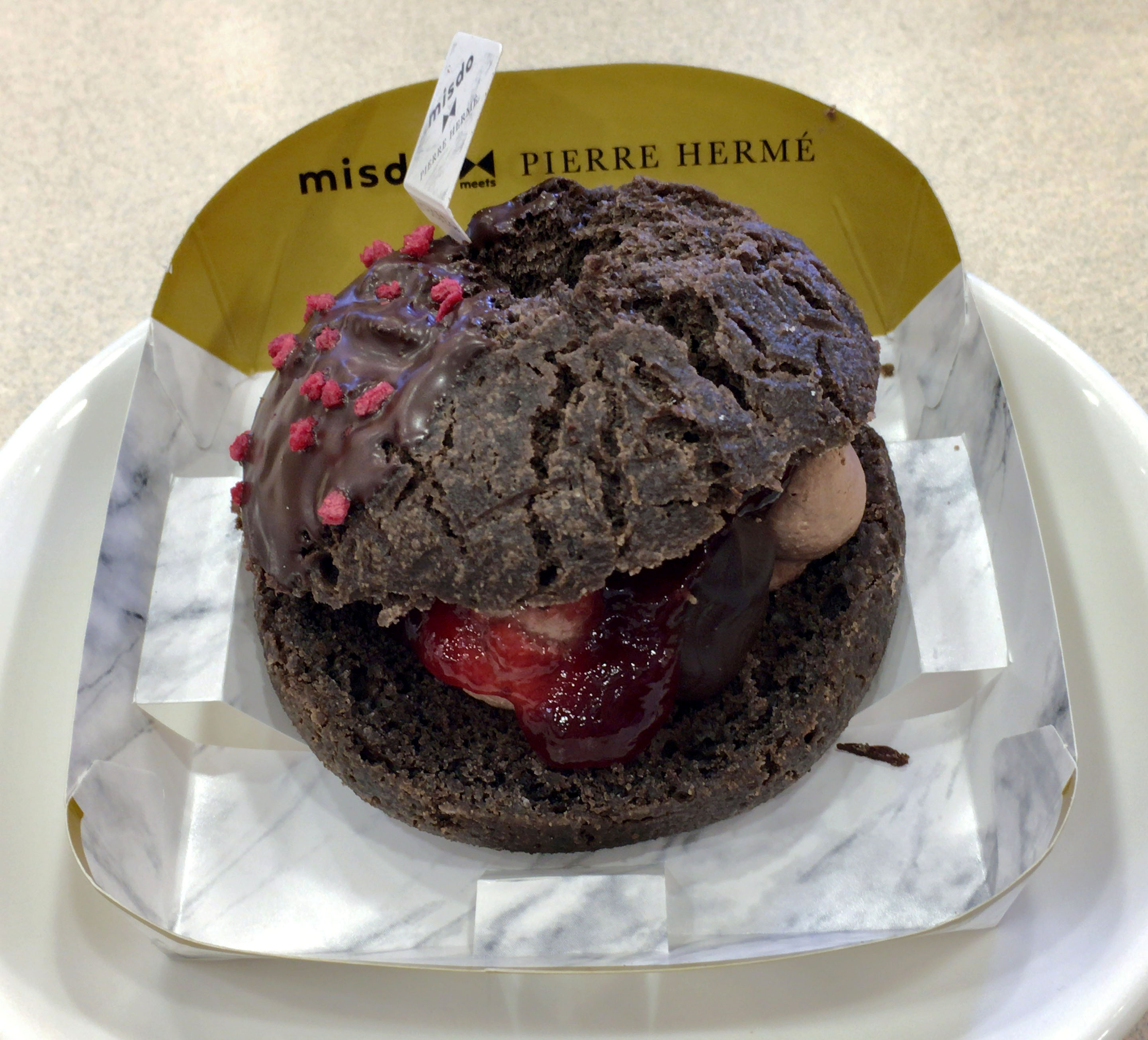

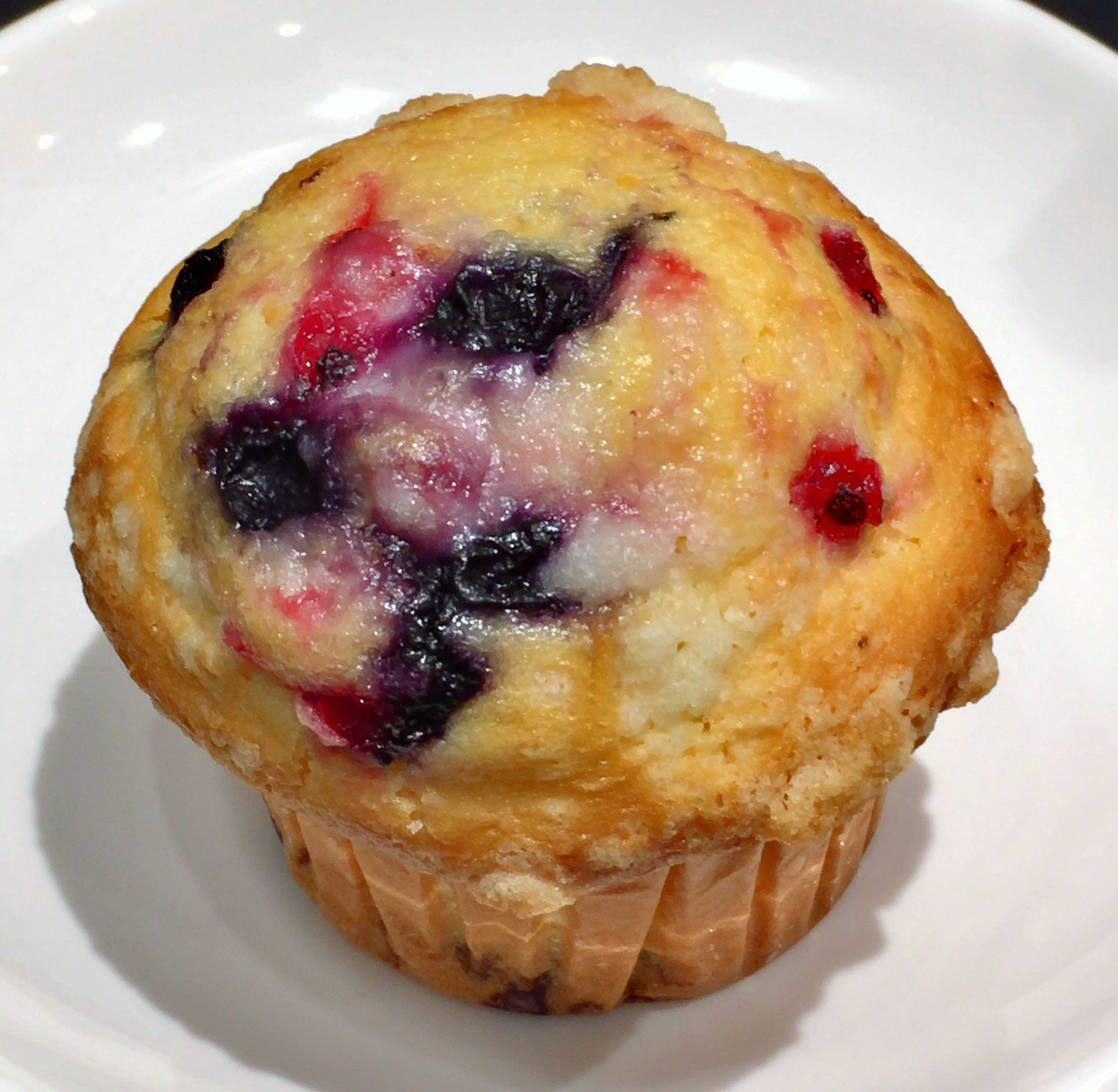

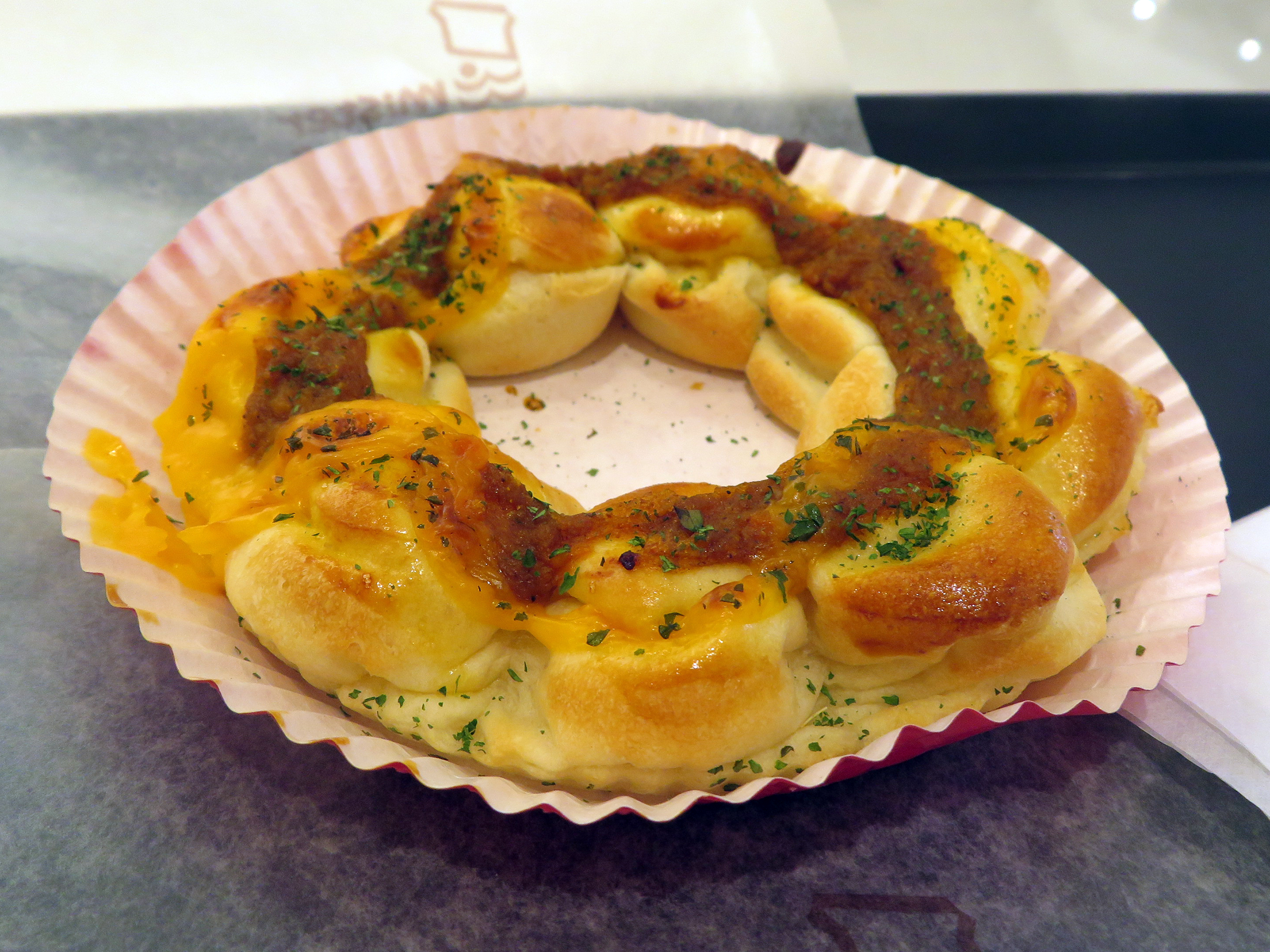

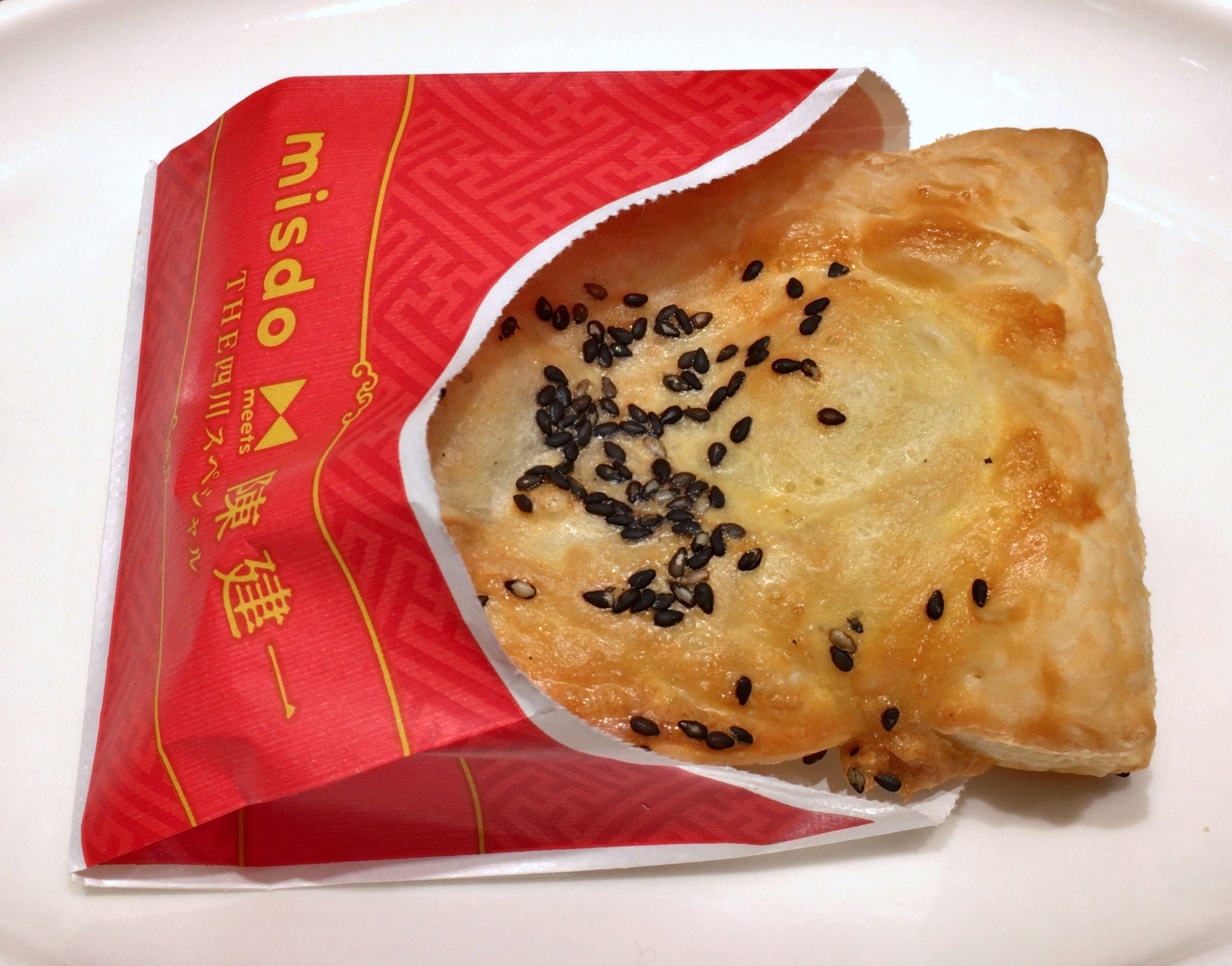

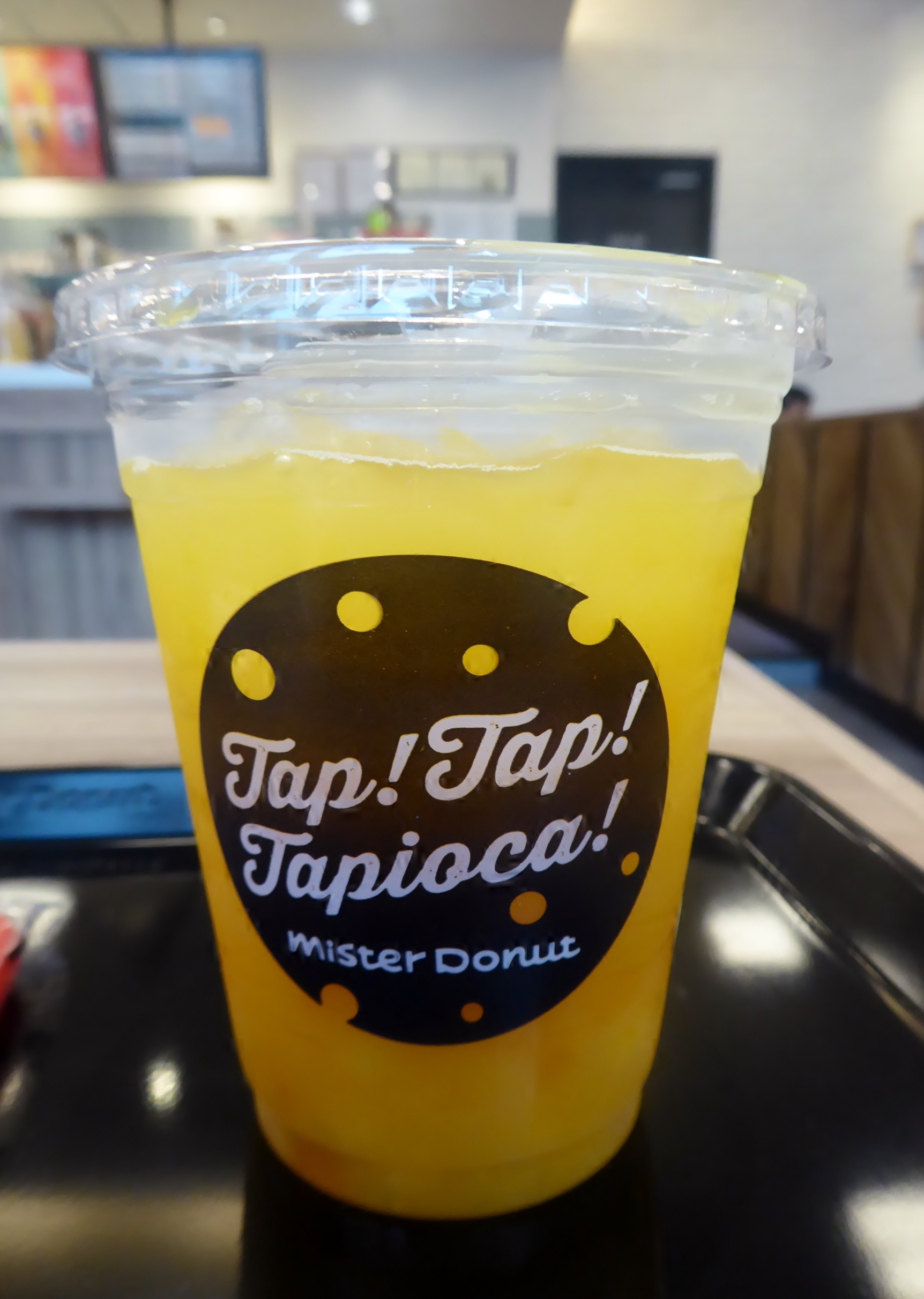

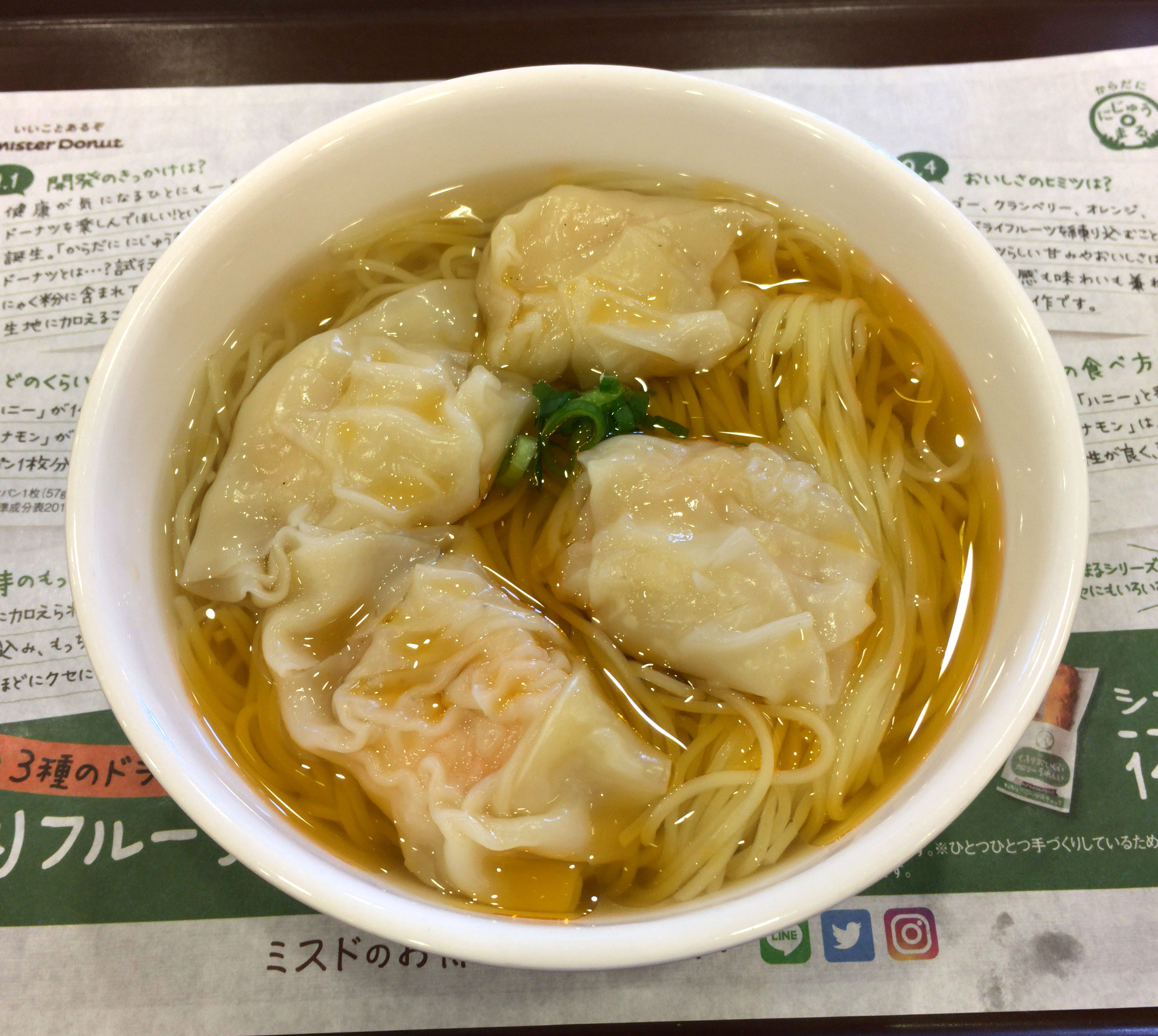

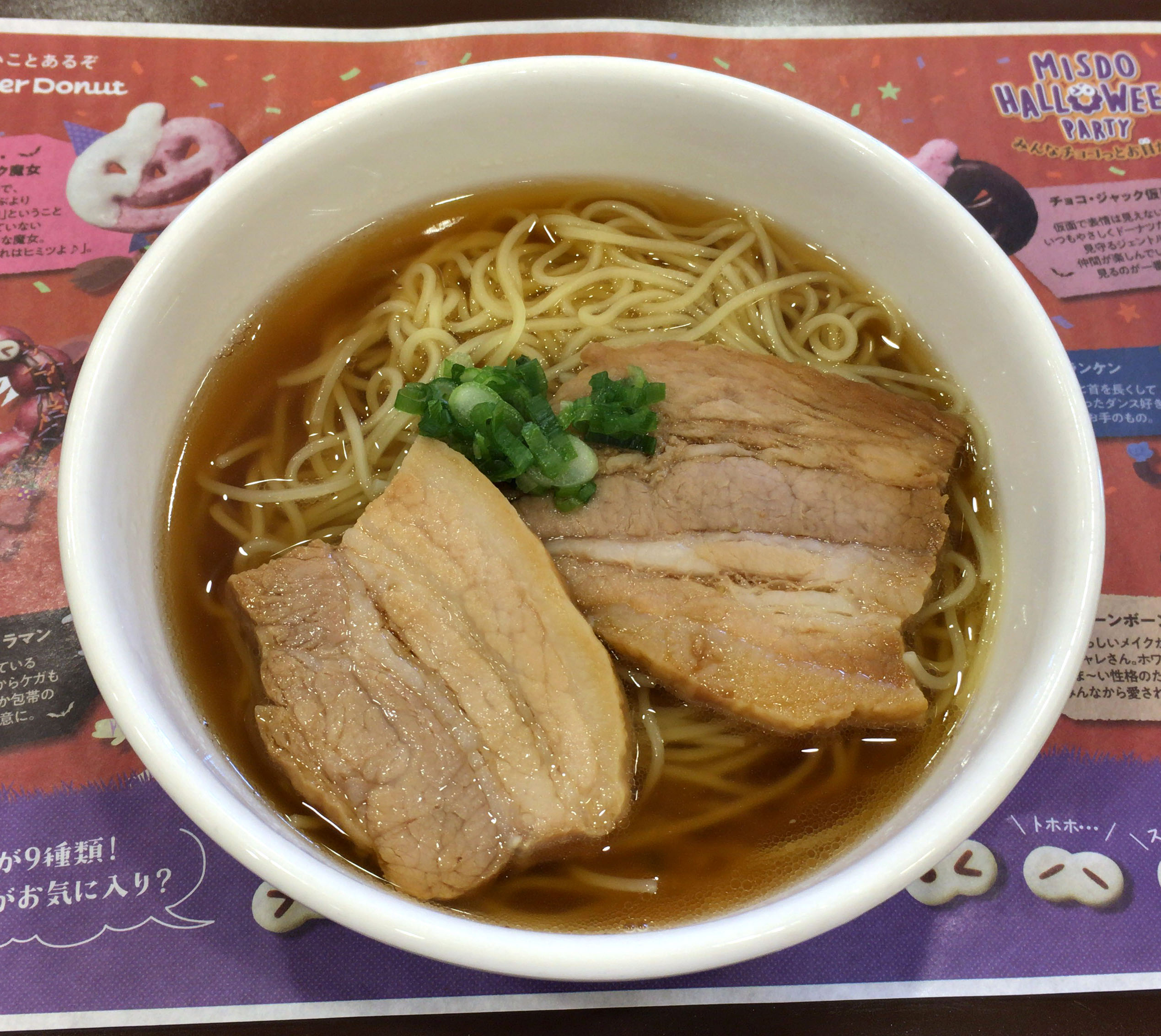

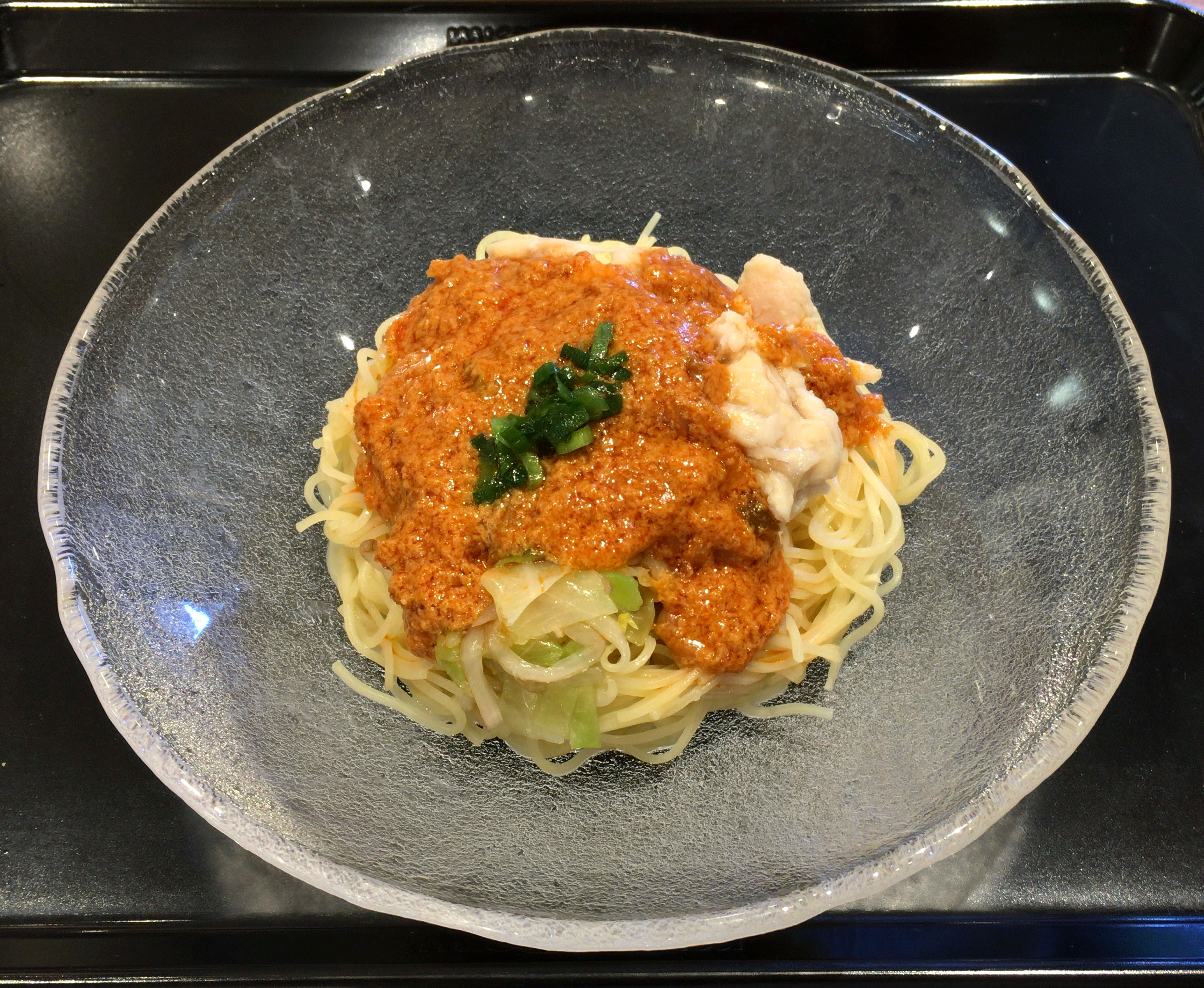

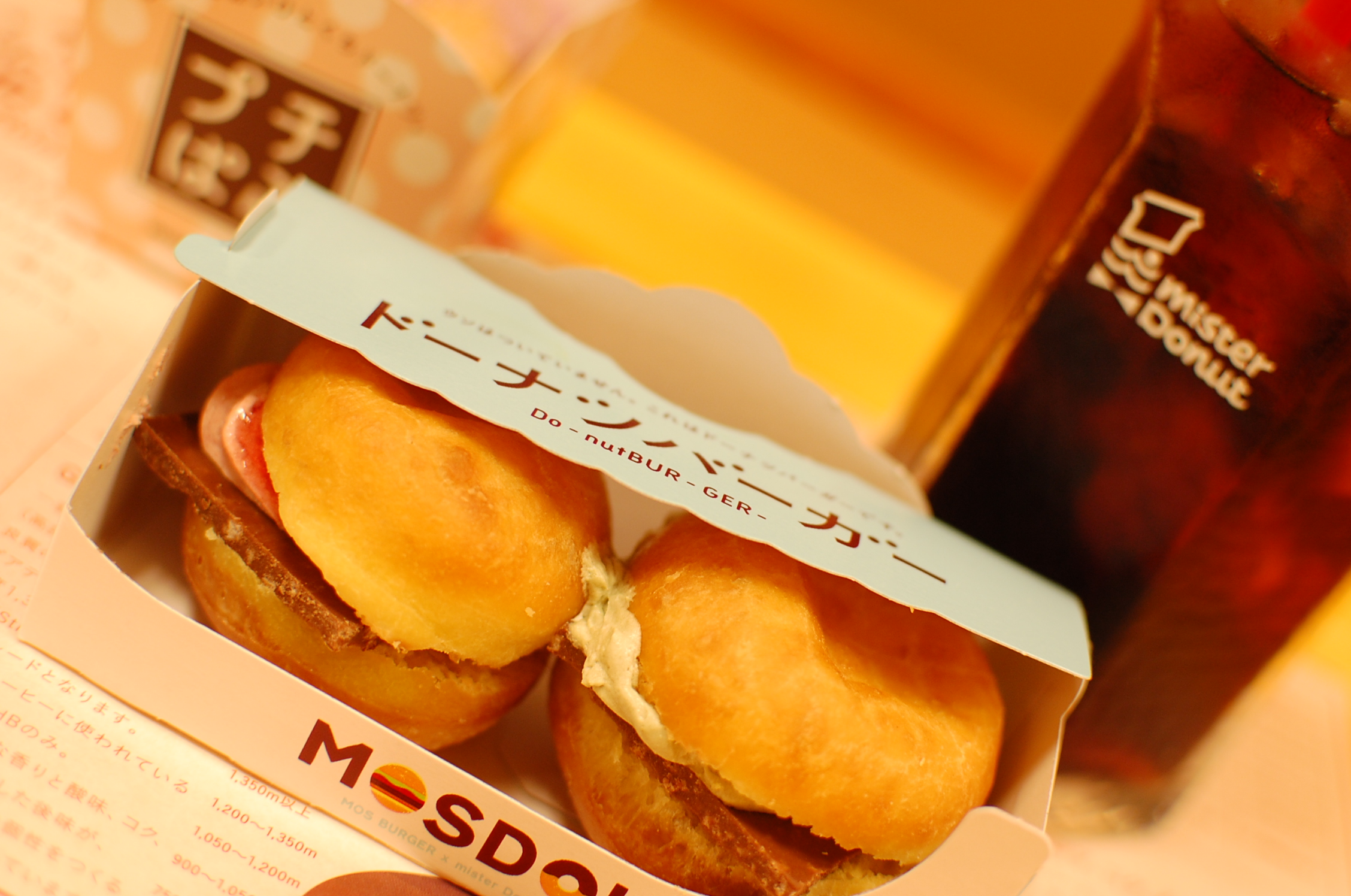
Burger using Mister Donut items as the bun

== See also ==
- List of doughnut shops
- List of coffeehouse chains
