= Harry Winokur =

American entrepreneur

- Born: 27 November 1910
- Died: 29 February 2004 (aged 93)
- Known for: founder of Mister Donut

Harry Winokur (27 November 1910 – 29 February 2004) was an American businessman. He created the Mister Donut chain of doughnut shops. The chain grew to include 550 shops before being bought out by the parent company of Dunkin' Donuts in 1990. He was awarded the Horatio Alger Award in 1965.

== Biography ==
Born in Boston to a low-income family, Winokur began working in his father's grocery store at age eight and later sold newspapers. After high school, he pursued correspondence courses and became a certified public accountant by age 25.

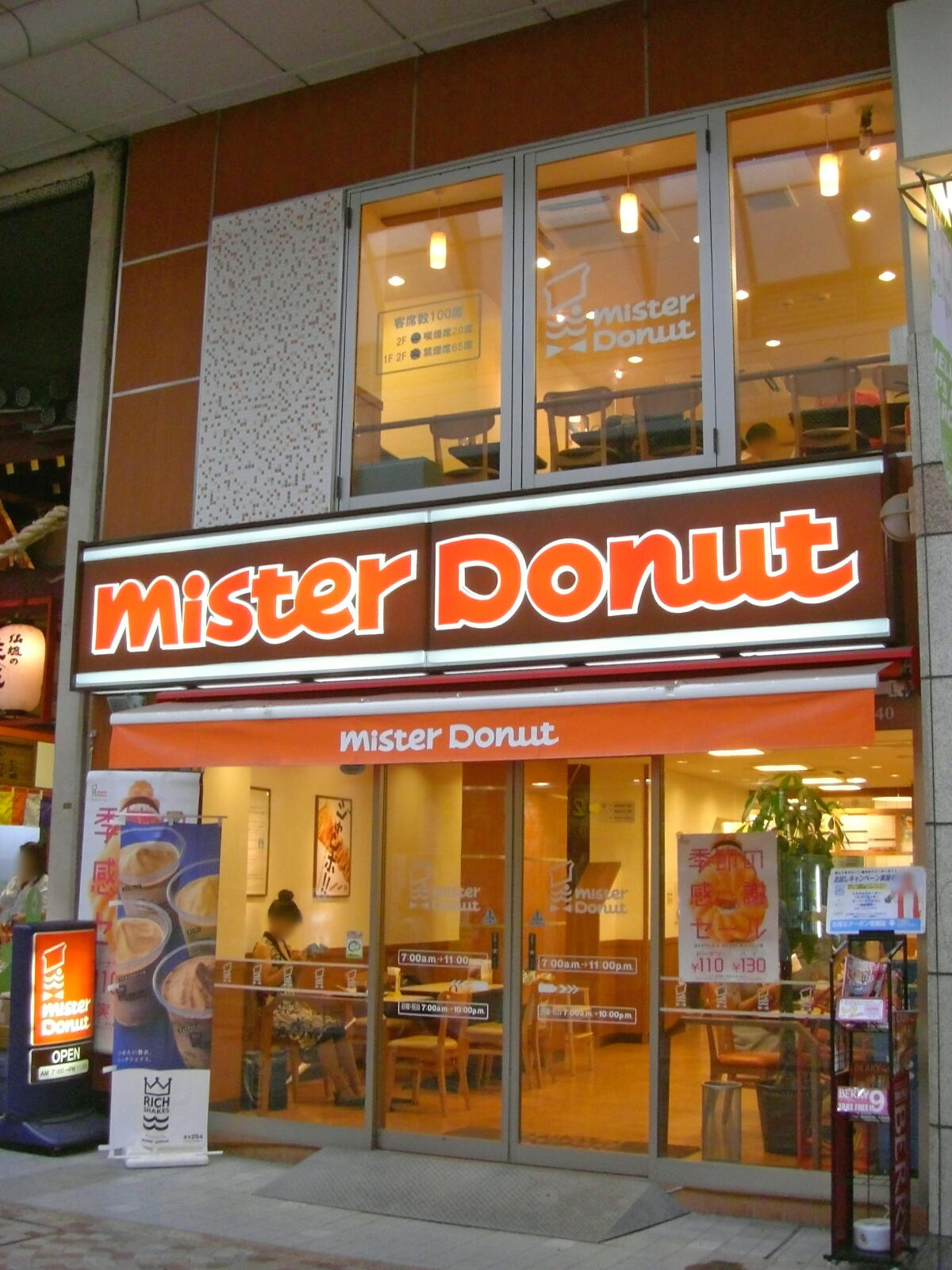
Mister Donut store

During World War II, Winokur shifted from accounting to start a catering service for factory workers. Noticing the demand for coffee and donuts, he established his first doughnut shop in 1949. The shop eventually evolved into the Mister Donut chain with over 600 locations. Following a 1970 sale of the company, Winokur continued in an advisory capacity, during which the chain expanded to over 800 outlets.

Winokur died on 29 February 2004 at age 93.
