= Santa Tecla =

Santa Tecla may mean:

- A saint: see Thecla
- Santa Tecla, Italy, a commune near Acireale, Sicily
- Santa Tecla, Este, a church building in Este, Italy
- Santa Tecla, Milan, a church building in Milan, Italy
- Santa Tecla, El Salvador, formerly named Nueva San Salvador

- Santa Tecla BC, a basketball club based in Santa Tecla
- Santa Tecla F.C., a football club based in Santa Tecla
