= The Firm season 2 =

The Firm
- Season 2
- The climb to the top starts here
- Starring: Peter Pek, Chan Boon Yong
- No. of episodes: 23

Release
- Original network: ntv7

Season chronology
- ← Previous; Season 1

The Firm is Malaysia's first corporate reality television programme produced by Popiah Pictures and ntv7. Hosted by Peter Pek and Chan Boon Yong, the show is directed by award-winning director Ng Ping Ho of Kopitiam fame. In The Firm, a group of professionals compete in an elimination-style competition to find the next corporate high-flyer.

Season 2 saw an increase from ten candidates to 14, and the number of episode from 10 to 13. It premièred prime time on ntv7 and Astro channel 107 on 2 August 2008. Contestants vie for the chance to get a contract to work for the chief executive officer of The Firm and RM100,000.

== Hosts/Judges ==
The Firm has two corporate leaders, and a CEO, who all judge the candidates at different stages:

- Peter Pek – renowned brand guru, writer, columnist, editor, publisher, designer, creative director, public speaker, and head of Malaysia's largest branding agency, Mercatus+.
- Chan Boon Yong – entrepreneur and founder of The Carat Club, a diamond retailer.
- Tengku Zafrul Aziz – CEO of Tune Money.

== Contestants ==
| Team 1 | Team 2 |
|---|---|
| Equity | Asset |
| Corporate Leader | Corporate Leader |
| Peter Pek | Chan Boon Yong |

Season 2 received over 500 applications in a nationwide search from January to April 2008. Of these, 100 were selected to be interviewed and the final 14 selected to appear in the show after extensive interviews. In addition to academic qualifications, individuals were selected based on their desire to excel, ambitious nature, focus, dedication and readiness to take charge. The 14 candidates are split into two teams that compete with each other. For the first time, a student was given the chance to compete. The team members are:

| Team Equity | Team Asset |
| Heng Boon Yew, 33 – Sales Manager; Jen Eu Wee Fung, 25 – Marketing Executive; Masami Mustaza, 24 – Journalist; Ngoh Choo Ann (C.A.), 30 – Marketing Director; Azti Dian Fitri Azmi (Dian), 31 – Publication Manager; Anoop Raj, 28 – Entrepreneur; Ridzuan Sa'ad, 24 – Corporate Trainer | Salasiah Abbas, 32 – Administration Manager; Noor Ain Hussin (Ain), 29 – Management Consultant; Christopher Lowe, 28 – Events Executive; Toh Joo Lee, 22 – Student; Terence Lee Meng Chen, 26 – Human Resources Consultant; Choi Kian You, 26 – Legal Assistant; Cheong Yuen Wai, 22 – Fitness Consultant |

Team Equity: Peter Pek (right) with team members

== Terminations ==
Each week, the team that loses that week's task is brought back into the boardroom where they will have to face their team's corporate leader, who will decide who should leave The Firm.

| Candidate | Age | Background | Terminated |
|---|---|---|---|
| None | | | Week 1 |
| Salasiah Abbas | 32 | Administration Manager | Week 2 |
| Terence Lee Meng Chen | 26 | Human Resources Consultant | Week 2 (Resigned) |
| Noor Ain Hussin (Ain) | 29 | Management Consultant | Week 3 |
| Anoop Raj | 28 | Entrepreneur | Week 4 (Absconded) |
| Ridzuan Sa'ad | 24 | Corporate Trainer | Week 4 |
| Toh Joo Lee | 22 | Student | Week 5 |
| Ngoh Choo Ann (C.A.) | 30 | Marketing Director | Week 6 |
| Cheong Yuen Wai | 22 | Fitness Consultant | Week 7 |
| Heng Boon Yew | 33 | Sales Manager | Week 8 |
| Masami Mustaza | 24 | Journalist | Week 9 |
| Choi Kian You | 26 | Legal Assistant | Week 10 |
| Christopher Lowe | 28 | Events Executive | Week 11 |
| Jen Eu Wee Fung | 25 | Marketing Executive | Week 11 |
| Noor Ain Hussin | 29 | Management Consultant | Week 13 |

Team Asset: Chan Boon Yong (left)with team members

Yellow indicates individual rounds.

== Episodes ==
=== Week 1 ===
- Airdate: 2 August 2008
- Brand: The C. Club
- Project: To package a weekend lunch promotion targeted at families for The C. Club restaurant in Pavilion Kuala Lumpur. Teams are to design an entire dining experience – from concept to menu, pricing to marketing. Teams also have to manage the restaurant during the task. The team that creates the most satisfying lunch experience wins the challenge.
- Equity team manager: Anoop
- Asset team manager: Terence
- Winning team: Asset
- Terminated: None
- Notes: Peter Pek decided that although the team lost, he would not terminate anyone from the team at this stage.

=== Week 2 ===
- Airdate: 9 August 2008
- Brand: Easy Pha-max
- Project: To organize a seminar to promote the opportunity for English speaking entrepreneurs to become a business partner for Easy Pha-max- the world's largest online herbal center. The seminar must be engaging, inspiring and encouraging. The team who organizes the most effective and convincing presentation wins the challenge.
- Equity team manager: Jen Eu
- Asset team manager: Chris
- Winning team: Equity
- Terminated: Salasiah
- Notes: Terence decided to resign from The Firm and left the show, making him the first candidate to do so in the entire series.

=== Week 3 ===
- Airdate: 16 August 2008
- Brand: Spritzer Natural Mineral Water
- Project: Spritzer is Malaysia's best-selling natural mineral water. Teams have to organize a tour of the Spritzer plant in Taiping, the largest and most integrated natural mineral water plant in the country. They also need to highlight the benefits of Spritzer's mineral water over conventional drinking water. The team with the most interesting and informative tour wins the challenge.
- Equity team manager: Dian
- Asset team manager: Ain
- Winning team: Equity
- Terminated: Ain
- Notes:
  - Chan Boon Yong was overseas and was replaced by Emily Kok, Chairman of Rentwise, a leading IT financing company in Malaysia, Singapore and Hong Kong.
  - Peter Pek and Emily Kok arrived in Taiping in a chauffeur-driven Mercedes-Benz while the teams traveled by coach.
  - Anoop failed to attend the brainstorming session with Peter Pek. He told the team that he was hospitalized. He later turned up unexpectedly despite claiming that he was bed-ridden. He told the team that he might lose his legs, he also needed to take care of his blind mother as he does not have a father to do that. The team did not appear to buy his story. Later, he failed to turn up on task day.
- Quotes: Masami to Anoop: So what are you trying to say? Are you going to die tomorrow?. Anoop: Who knows?

=== Week 4 ===
- Airdate: 23 August 2008
- Brand: Tune Money
- Project: To get new members for Tune Card, a prepaid Visa card from online financial services company, Tune Money, Tengku Zafrul's company. Each team is given a space to enable them to reach the card's target market. The team that signs the highest number of new members wins the challenge.
- Equity team manager: Masami
- Asset team manager: Yuen Wai
- Winning team: Asset
- Terminated: Ridzuan
- Notes:
  - Jen appeared in an advertisement on two days in the Malay Mail for the task. The ad's headline was "Tune me on".
  - Anoop told Masami that he was not going to turn up on task day in an SMS. By absconding, Anoop ceased to become a member of his team, making him the second person in the entire series to resign.
  - Team Asset signed 112 new members, and Team Equity 95. Team Asset had two less members.
- Quotes: Peter Pek: In business, you can never ever assume. (Talking about the team not conducting a reconnaissance of the location site).

=== Week 5 ===
- Airdate: 30 August 2008
- Brand: Brand Mercatus
- Project: Mercatus, Peter Pek's company, is the country's largest integrated brand management organization. The task was to help one of their clients, the Bubba Gump Shrimp Company (a branded chain of seafood restaurants inspired by the 1994 Academy Award winning film, Forrest Gump), grow their brand's reputation. Teams have to organize a brand PR event to introduce the restaurant to the media. The event is to include a food tasting session. The team that organizes the most effective brand PR event wins the challenge.
- Equity team manager: C.A.
- Asset team manager: Kian You
- Winning team: Equity
- Terminated: Joo Lee
- Notes:
  - In a surprising twist, the winner and runner-up of Season 1, Joel Neoh and Ernie Chen, were the corporate leaders for this task. Joel and Ernie were put in charge of Team Equity and Team Asset, respectively. Peter Pek was the client and Chan Boon Yong did not appear in this episode.

=== Week 6 ===
- Airdate: 6 September 2008
- Brand: Air Asia
- Project: Air Asia is the only international airline to fly to Banda Aceh, Indonesia, their latest destination. Teams have to promote this destination for the airline. The team that creates the best event to educate, change perceptions and promote the destination to the general public wins the task.
- Equity team manager: Boon Yew
- Asset team manager: Jen
- Winning team: Asset
- Terminated: C.A.
- Notes:
  - Peter Pek pointed out that Team Equity had two more members than Team Asset. Team Asset was allowed to pick a member from Team Equity. They chose Jen.
  - Citibank was brought in by Team Equity as a sponsor. However, their set-up overshadowed the Air Asia brand.

=== Week 7 ===
- Airdate: 13 September 2008
- Brand: Fitness First
- Project: Teams have to sell coupons to raise money for a charity event of Fitness First called "Miracle 08" in aid of Mercy Malaysia, for relief work in China, and a children home for the disabled, Kirtarsh. The team that raised the most funds for the charity via the sale of coupons wins the challenge.
- Equity team manager: Dian
- Asset team manager: Yuen Wai
- Winning team: Equity
- Terminated: Yuen Wai
- Notes:
  - In a surprise twist, Ain was brought back to join Team Equity. Peter Pek said that it was to address the imbalance of the team numbers.
  - Team Asset raised $9,150, while Team Equity raised $10,850.

=== Week 8 ===
- Airdate: 20 September 2008
- Brand: Nestlé
- Project: Nestlé Omega Plus is the only milk in the country that helps lower cholesterol. The task is to produce a one-minute infomercial that highlights the benefits of the product. Teams are to oversee every aspect of the production, from the concept to casting, shooting to editing. The team that produces the most creative and effective infomercial, wins.
- Equity team manager: Masami
- Asset team manager: Chris
- Winning team: Asset
- Terminated: Boon Yew

=== Week 9 ===
- Airdate: 27 September 2008
- Brand: Pensonic
- Project: Teams have to run a roadshow to promote and sell the Pensonic Pure Water System. The task will be judged on two main criteria – the number of units sold and how effective they are in raising the awareness of the product. The team that organises the best roadshow will win the challenge.
- Equity team manager: Ain
- Asset team manager: No official manager, but Kian You agreed to "take charge"
- Winning team: Asset
- Terminated: Masami
- Notes:
  - Peter Pek and Chan Boon Yong announced at the beginning of the show that the teams will now report directly to Tengku Zafrul Aziz.
  - Tengku Zafrul offered to allow any member who wanted to resign to do so. Nobody did. He also provided the option to elect their own Team Leaders, or to choose not to have one.
  - Team Asset engaged Hot FM to help them broadcast information on the event to its listeners.

=== Week 10 ===
- Airdate: 4 October 2008
- Brand: National Council of Senior Citizens' Organisations of Malaysia (NASCOM)
- Project: To organise an open day for a NASCOM home in Setapak, which is housed in a Kuala Lumpur City Hall residential building. The objective of the task is to create awareness and also to raise funding for NASCOM. Evaluation will be based on each individual's performance.
- Terminated: Kian You
- Notes:
  - Teams have now been merged into one and candidates will compete on an individual basis.
  - The open day event featured celebrity singer Ebi Kornelis from Akademi Fantasia Season 5.

=== Week 11 ===
- Airdate: 11 October 2008
- Brand: Sunrise
- Project: Each candidate is given $500 to start a new business at the Sunrise "Arts, Bric-a-Brac and Craft" (ABC) market. The objective is to make the most profit. The one that makes the most money will be safe, while the remaining candidates will have to face a possible termination.
- Winner: Ain
- Terminated: Jen and Chris
- Notes:
  - Jen made $172 in profit, Dian $375, Chris $168 and Ain $676. This guaranteed Ain entry to the finals and she was spared from returning to the boardroom.
  - For the first time, each remaining candidate was seen by the CEO in the boardroom individually first, rather than as a group.
  - In a surprise twist and the first time this season, the CEO announced during the boardroom terminating session that two candidates will be terminated this time round.

=== Week 12 ===
- Airdate: 18 October 2008
- Brands: Breast Cancer Welfare Association and Rumah Hope
- Project: The two finalists, Ain and Dian, have to organize fundraiser events to support different charities. Ain is to organize a celebrity futsal event to raise funds for Rumah Hope, a children's shelter; while Dian has to put together a fundraiser in aid of the breast cancer Welfare Association featuring celebrities. Samsung was the main sponsor of Dian's event, while Adidas sponsored Ain's.
- Notes:
  - This penultimate episode shows interviews with both the finalists' families. It focuses on the preparation for the tasks and the execution will be shown in the next episode.
  - Previous candidates were brought back to help the two finalists. Jen, Joo Lee, Kian You and Yuen Wai returned to help Ain; while Masami, Ridzuan and Chris were tasked to assist Dian.

=== Week 13 ===
- Airdate: 25 October 2008 – Season finale
- Brands: Breast Cancer Welfare Association and Rumah Hope
- Project: Continuation from previous week's episode
- Season Winner: Azti Dian Fitri Azmi (Dian), 31 – Publication Manager
- Notes:
  - Numerous celebrities appeared over the final two episodes including songstress Adibah Noor; ntv7's The Breakfast Show host, Jonathan Putra; Malaysian Idol's Ash Nair; Andrew Westwood; Azah Yasmin Yusof; Nell Ng; Chelsea Ng; Baki Zainal; Azura Zainal and Henry Golding.
  - Malaysian Idol's Soo Kui Jien and Fly FM's Phat Fabes had their photos shown on screen but did not attend. Jien snubbed the breast cancer charity because Dian forgot to call him at an agreed time, and Phat Fabes was ill and could not attend Ain's event.
  - Ain's team presented Jen with a cake as it was her birthday.
  - Candidates that helped the two finalists were brought back to the final boardroom session to give their comments. Yuen Wai did not turn up. When asked to choose who they think ought to win, Masami, Ridzuan, and Jeniffer chose Dian, while Kian You picked Ain.
  - Tengku Zafrul and Peter Pek attended both events while Chan Boon Yong attended Dian's event.
