= The Firm season 1 =

The Firm
- Season 1
- Starring: Peter Pek, Chan Boon Yong, Zafrul Aziz
- No. of episodes: 23

Release
- Original network: ntv7
- Original release: 24 June – 26 August 2007

Season chronology
- Next → Season 2

The Firm is Malaysia's first corporate reality television programme produced by Popiah Pictures and ntv7. Hosted by Peter Pek and Chan Boon Yong, the show is directed by award-winning director Ng Ping Ho of Kopitiam fame.

In season one of The Firm, a group of 10 professionals compete in an elimination-style competition to find the next corporate high-flyer. The winner gets attractive prizes as well as a one-year contract with Tune Money, Asia's first "no-frills" online financial service founded by Dato' Tony Fernandes (founder of budget airline, AirAsia). In addition to Pek and Chan, the other judge on the show is Tengku Zafrul Aziz, making it the only television show in Malaysia to have three millionaire judges.

The show attempts to separate the weak from the strong, the under-achievers from the over-achievers and the followers from the leaders. Each week, candidates compete in a series of tasks dealing with different disciplines in business that is imperative to the success of a corporate high-flier. Amongst others, these include branding, promotions, positioning and catering to target markets. The catch phrase used in the show is "You're terminated". The show premièred prime time on ntv7 on 24 June 2007. Season one of the series was presented by Intel Core 2 Duo, and the official radio station was Fly FM.

== Hosts/Judges ==
The Firm has two corporate leaders, and a CEO, who all judge the candidates at different stages:

- Peter Pek – renowned brand guru, writer, columnist, editor, publisher, designer, creative director, public speaker, and head of Malaysia's largest branding agency, Brand Mercatus.
- Chan Boon Yong – entrepreneur and founder of The Carat Club, a diamond retailer.
- Tengku Zafrul Aziz – CEO of Tune Money.

== Contestants ==
Team Dynamic: Peter Pek with (l-r) Angeline, Jahar, Carmen, Joel and Keng Teck

Team Momentum: Chan Boon Yong with (l-r) Khai, Anrie, Ivan, Lin and Ernie

Team 1	Team 2	Individuals
Dynamic	Momentum	Combined
Corporate Leader	Corporate Leader	CEO
Peter Pek	Chan Boon Yong	Tengku Zafrul Aziz

The show received over 500 applications, of which only ten were selected after several rounds of interviews. In addition to academic qualifications, individuals were selected based on their desire to excel, ambitious nature, focus, dedication and readiness to take charge. The ten contestants are split into 2 teams that compete with each other. The original team members are:

Team Dynamic	Team Momentum
Angeline Simone Chin, 32; Carmen Yap, 28; Dr Mohamad Azaharani bin Seruji (Doctor Jahar), 34; Joel Neoh Eu-Jin, 24; Yap Keng Teck, 34	Too Sze Yuing (Anrie), 24; Khairul Bariah bt Shaifulbahri (Khai), 27; Ernie Chen, 30; Wong Chee Hoong, Ivan, 33; Fazlina Azreen binti Mustapha Kamal (Lin), 28

In episode 5, changes to the teams were made to ensure a more balanced playing field for both teams. In episode 6, a terminated candidate was chosen to re-join The Firm.

Week	Candidate	Remarks
5	Joel Neoh Eu-Jin	Was chosen by Ernie and Ivan to move over to Team Momentum after a team imbalance of 2 to 4
6	Too Sze Yuing (Anrie)	Was chosen by Carmen and Keng Teck to re-join The Firm

== Terminations ==
Each week, the team that loses that week's task is brought back into the boardroom where they will have to face their team's corporate leader, who will decide who should leave The Firm.

Candidate	Age	Background	Terminated
Ernie Chen	30	Entrepreneur	Week 10
Yap Keng Teck	34	Brand consultant	Week 8
Too Sze Yuing (Anrie) – returning candidate	24	Marketing executive	Week 8
Carmen Yap	28	Human resources consultant	Week 7
Wong Chee Hoong, Ivan	33	Sales manager	Week 6
Dr Mohamad Azaharani bin Seruji (Jahar)	34	Management consultant	Week 5
Fazlina Azreen binti Mustapha Kamal (Lin)	28	Corporate planning executive	Week 4
Too Sze Yuing (Anrie)	24	Marketing executive	Week 3
Khairul Bariah bt Shaifulbahri (Khai)	27	PR executive	Week 2
Angeline Simone Chin	32	Customer service manager	Week 1

== Episodes ==
=== Week 1 ===
- Airdate: 24 June 2007
- Brand: Fitness First
- Project: Teams had to organise and run an effective open day for Fitness First.
- Dynamic team manager: Dr Jahar
- Momentum team manager: Ernie
- Winning team: Momentum
  - Sent to Conference Room: Dr Jahar, Angeline
  - Terminated: Angeline, for supposedly not having the right ethics by suggesting to Joel to check out on the events done by the other team. The idea was earlier mooted by Dr Jahar due to an invite by Khai from the other team. Angeline initially thought it would be good to find out what the other team does so they could further improve themselves to eventually win. Just like many other businesses, entrepreneurs will always be on the lookout on what their competitors would do. In reality, Angeline was actually terminated due to her delicate condition at the time when filming took place and would not want to risk her situation due to hectic filming schedule.(Peter Pek to Angeline: "Ethics in the real corporate world is very important – it's paramount.")

=== Week 2 ===
- Airdate: 1 July 2007
- Brand: Nestlé
- Project: Teams had to organise an event to educate the public on the link between cholesterol and heart disease, and link the Nestlé Omega Plus brand as an effective way to lower cholesterol.
- Dynamic team manager: Keng Teck
- Momentum team manager: Khai
- Winning team: Dynamic
  - Sent to Conference Room: Khai, Ivan
  - Terminated: Khai, for failing to be an effective leader due to a leadership style which attempts to please everyone in the team.

=== Week 3 ===
- Airdate: 8 July 2007
- Brand: Burger King
- Project: Each team had to design their own value meal. The team that makes the most profit wins the challenge.
- Dynamic team manager: Joel
- Momentum team manager: Anrie
- Winning team: Dynamic
  - Sent to Conference Room: The entire team sat in the initial stage but as Anrie, as team leader, said that she should be the one to go, no one was called back in.
  - Terminated: Anrie, who said that as team leader, she would take responsibility for the loss and should leave.

=== Week 4 ===
- Airdate: 15 July 2007
- Brand: SilkyGirl
- Project: To create an 8-page magazine supplement to showcase Silkygirl's brand personality. The team that produces the most creative supplement will win the challenge.
- Dynamic team manager: Carmen
- Momentum team manager: Lin
- Winning team: Dynamic
  - Sent to Conference Room: As Team Momentum only had three members left, all three sat in on the elimination session.
  - Terminated: Lin, who said that Ernie contributed the least and deserved to leave The Firm. However, Chan Boon Yong disagreed with her, and felt that she did not give enough good reasons why she deserved to stay.

=== Week 5 ===
- Airdate: 22 July 2007
- Brand: Procter & Gamble's Gillette
- Project: Each team has to enhance Gillette’s website for its Mach3 Turbo brand that is geared towards getting the present urban male target market to upgrade to Gillette's premium-level shavers.
- Dynamic team manager: Keng Teck
- Momentum team manager: Ivan
- Winning team: Momentum
  - Sent to Conference Room: Jahar, Carmen
  - Terminated: Jahar, for consistently being missing in action and for contributing the least overall. (Peter Pek to Jahar: I am looking for a leader and not a follower.)
- Notes: Due to a team imbalance of 2 to 4, Team Momentum was given the chance to pull a member from Dynamic over to their team. They choose Joel.

=== Week 6 ===
- Airdate: 29 July 2007
- Brand: Intel
- Project: The teams were each given an IT store located in Low Yat Plaza. Their task is to sell as many Intel Core 2 Duo processors as possible, as well as to educate the public on the benefits of the new processor.
- Dynamic team manager: Carmen
- Momentum team manager: Joel
- Winning team: Dynamic
  - Sent to Conference Room: In a twist of events, both teams were brought back. Although Team Dynamic won, both the representative from Intel as well as Peter Pek were not impressed with the overall performance of the team members However, they were let off and no one was terminated from Team Dynamic.
  - Terminated: Ivan, for not doing enough and being a step behind the rest of his team.
- Notes: All the old professionals that had been terminated from the show were asked to come back. Team Dynamic was asked to select one of them to re-join their team. They choose Anrie. This is also the first time in which the winning team was brought back to the boardroom. Even though the team had more sales, their execution left much to be desired.

=== Week 7 ===
- Airdate: 5 August 2007
- Remarks: The remaining five undergo an abrupt "corporate restructuring", in which the two teams merge and leave their two corporate leaders for a new CEO, whom the eventual winner would work for. They are also told that from now, it's every person for himself/herself.
- Brand: Sunrise
- Project: The team is given an empty show unit of a new condominium development by Sunrise, which they have to furnish so that it appeals to the target market – young upwardly mobile professionals.
  - Terminated: Carmen, for not knowing her task well and not knowing the answers to important questions, such as the yield of the property.

=== Week 8 ===
- Airdate: 12 August 2007
- Brand: Plaza Damas, Boustead
- Project: Each candidate is given a stall at Plaza Damas in Sri Hartamas. Here, they have to set up a stall to sell any products of their choosing. It can be anything from old clothes, to books to shoes. They will also be judged on their negotiating skills, both when they obtain their products, and when they sell to their customers. The candidate who makes the highest profit within acceptable and ethical business practice wins.
- Winner: Joel
- Sent to Conference Room: Ernie, Keng Teck and Anrie
- Terminated: Anrie and Keng Teck
- Notes: This episode was the first time that 2 candidates were terminated at the same time. It is also the first episode in which the catchphrase "You're terminated" was not used.

=== Week 9 ===
- Airdate: 19 August 2007
- Brands: Kiwanis and Rotary International
- Project: The final two candidates, Ernie and Joel, had to organise a movie premiere and a celebrity fashion show respectively, to raise funds for charity. Ernie's event is for Kiwanis, and Joel's for Rotary.
- Notes:
  - This episode was the first time that no candidate was terminated.
  - All the old candidates were brought back to help the two finalists.
  - The episode ended in a "to be continued" cliffhanger.

=== Week 10 ===
- Airdate: 26 August 2007 – Season finale
- Brands: Kiwanis and Rotary International
- Project: Continuation from previous week's episode.
- Season Winner: Joel Neoh Eu-Jin, 24, youth entrepreneur
- Notes:
  - All the old candidates were brought back to the conference hall to talk about the two finalists.
  - Both corporate leaders gave their opinions throughout the episode and probably had a part to play in deciding the ultimate winner.

== Trivia ==
- Peter Pek was the first to use the catchphrase, "You're Terminated!". Chan used the phrase the most in the series – four times.
- Sarimah Ibrahim performed at Ernie's charity movie premier. Celebrities that appeared at Joel's fashion charity show included Alan Yun, Alvin Wong, Andrew Westwood, Azah Yasmin Yusoff, Azura Zainal, Azwin Andy, Chelsia Ng, Choy Wan, May Wan, Hansen Lee, Joanna Bessey, Jolene Chin, Justin Chan, Mimi Rahzia, Sazzy Falak, Shamser Sidhu, Xandria Ooi and Yasmin Hani.
- In episode 9, Lin and Carmen were shown getting jewellery to wear from The Carat Club, owned by Chan.
- Peter Pek was the only personality from the show to be featured in a live interview on Fly FM's Big Bang Breakfast Show. All other personalities from the show were featured on Fly FM's Rush Hour, which is broadcast in the late afternoon.
- In addition to a job offer from financial services company Tune Money, the winner, Joel, won a Ssangyong Actyon Sports XD1 200 four-wheel drive.
- The winner, Joel Neoh, was the youngest candidate in the first series.
