= Ghost (Malaysian TV series) =

- Genre: Drama, mystery
- Created by: Ng Ping Ho
- Developed by: Popiah Pictures
- Directed by: Ng Ping Ho and others
- Starring: Season One; Nazrudin Rahman; Cheryl Samad; Carmen Soo; Reefa; Razif Hashim Season Two; Cheryl Samad; Anding Indrawani; Isma Hanum; Colin Kirton; Fairil Desa; Melissa Campbell
- Opening theme: Masih Jua by Douglas Lim and Chelsia Ng
- Country of origin: Malaysia
- Original languages: Malay; English
- No. of seasons: 2
- No. of episodes: 10 (Season 1), 13 (Season 2)

Production
- Executive producers: Ng Ping Ho; Anne Low
- Producer: Ng Ping Ho
- Editors: Season 1 Kiang Hon Yeat Season 2 M.S. Prem Nath; Lew Cheng Teck
- Running time: 1 hr per episode

Original release
- Network: 8TV
- Release: 3 February 2008 – 19 April 2009

Ghost is a Malaysian supernatural mystery thriller television drama series produced by Popiah Pictures. The first season of ten episodes starred Nazrudin Rahman, Cheryl Samad, Carmen Soo, Reefa and Razif Hashim, and aired on 8TV beginning 3 February 2008. The second season of thirteen episodes began airing on 19 April 2009 and stars Cheryl Samad, Anding Indrawani, Isma Hanum, Colin Kirton and Melissa Campbell.

== Plot ==
Season One tells of Eza (Cheryl Samad), a witty journalist endeavouring to solve the mystery surrounding the death of her favourite film star, Zack Imran (Nazrudin Rahman). When Eza meets Zack leaving a hotel, lost and disoriented, her excitement soon turns to fear and confusion as she later discovers that Zack had earlier died, purportedly in a car accident. Realising that only she can see Zack's soul, she sets out with Zack's help to investigate his death. Over time, a bond between the living and the dead materialises.

In Season Two, Eza meets the ghost of a troubled teenager named Harum (Isma Hanum) while investigating the disappearance of Alicia Soo (Melissa Campbell), the socialite daughter of prominent attorney Edmund Soo (Colin Kirton). Edmund enlists the help of a psychic private investigator named Alam (Anding Indrawani) to trace Alicia. Meanwhile, a serial killer begins sending Eza photos of his murder victims, and a link between the murders, Alicia's disappearance, Harum's death and Zack Imran begins to surface.

== Cast and characters ==
=== Main characters ===
- Cheryl Samad as Eza Azmi, a journalist
- Nazrudin Rahman as Zack Imran, a former actor

==== Introduced in Season 1 ====
- Carmen Soo as Julie Cheah, a model, Eza's best friend
- Radhi Khalid as Dato' Zakaria, Faizura's husband
- Yasmin Isa as Datin Faizura, Zakaria's wife, Zack's former girlfriend
- Sharon Syarafina as Maria Zainal/Susan Voon, Zack's die-hard fan
- Razif Hashim as Azham, Eza's ex-boyfriend
- Nas-T as Farouk, Eza's boyfriend
- Chew Kin Wah as David Tan, a film producer
- Tony Eusoff as Dr Jamal Hafiz, a therapist, police consultant
- Belinda Chee as Cindy Cheah, Julie's older sister
- Reefa as Jimmy Rozario, Zack's manager, a childhood friend

==== Introduced in Season 2 ====
- Anding Indrawani as Alam/Sham Tompok/Zack Wannabe, Eza's ally, a psychic
- Isma Hanum as Harum Abdullah, a former bartender
- Colin Kirton as Edmund Soo Yiuh Hung, a lawyer
- Melissa Campbell as Alicia Soo Yik Peng, a student, friend of Harum
- Fairil Emran Desa as Fariz, Eza's fiancé
- Zahiril Adzim as Ridzuan Salleh, an aspiring singer-songwriter, Harum's boyfriend
- Juliana Evans as Lydia, Fariz's ex-girlfriend

==== Others ====
- Faruq Hafiz as Pak Cik Guard
- Mohd Razak Salimin as Amesh
- Jamal Jamaluddin as Insp. Razak
- Megat Sharizal as Romeo
- Chelsea Ng as Baby
- Jefri Jefrizal as Inspektor Mazdin
- Iedil Putra as Adnan
- Adi Bear as Mansur
- Azmir Abdullah as Dato' Razak
- Azah Yasmin Yusoff as Kasih Ismail
- Wong Wai Hoong as Wai Teong Huat
- Mohammed Falliq as Zafrul Mohamed Attas
- Valerie Vanessa Ebal as Ina Hasnul
- Adzrie Faiz as Johan Putra
- Azri Abdul Hamid as Adli
- Juliana Ibrahim as Ilyana/Estelle
- Daphne Iking as Sara
- Jeff Omar as Pak Hassan
