= Colin Kirton =

Malaysian stage and television actor

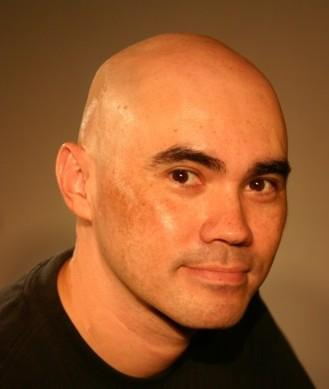
- Born: Colin Kirton; Kuantan, Pahang, Malaysia
- Occupation: Actor

Colin Kirton is a Malaysian stage and television actor. He is also known for his work as a director, trainer, musician, singer, choir director, host/emcee and voice actor. He was nominated for Best Vocal Performance (Solo) at the 2007 BOH Cameronian Arts Awards for his leading role in the Kuala Lumpur Performing Arts Centre’s 2006 production of Broken Bridges – The Musical and won for Best Group Performance (Theatre) as part of the ensemble of Footstool Players' production of Crazy Little Thing Called Love, which he also created, produced and directed, at the 2009 BOH Cameronian Arts Awards.

On television, Kirton is best known for playing Edmund Soo in Season 2 of Ghost (2009), a supernatural mystery thriller series produced by Popiah Pictures, Colonel Williams in Double Vision's period drama Age of Glory 2 (2010) and Mr Smith in MediaCorp's Mining Magnate (2012/2013).

In 2001, Kirton formed Footstool Players, a Christian theatre company whose touring productions are watched by thousands each year across Malaysia. He is currently the company's artistic director. Kirton also regularly teaches on issues pertaining to the arts and Christian spirituality.

Kirton trained in professional theatre at Rosebud School of the Arts and Rosebud Theatre in Canada.

He is of Scottish, Chinese (Nyonya) and Burmese ancestry and was born in Kuantan. His father, Eric Kirton, came to Malaya during the Malayan Emergency and later married his mother, Tan Cheng Kim, whom he met at a church camp. His paternal great grandfather, William Waddell, working for his uncle Sir Robert McAlpine, oversaw the building of the renowned West Highland Railway and Glenfinnan Viaduct in Scotland, famously featured in the Harry Potter movies.
