= American Textile History Museum =

Former textile museum in Lowell, Massachusetts

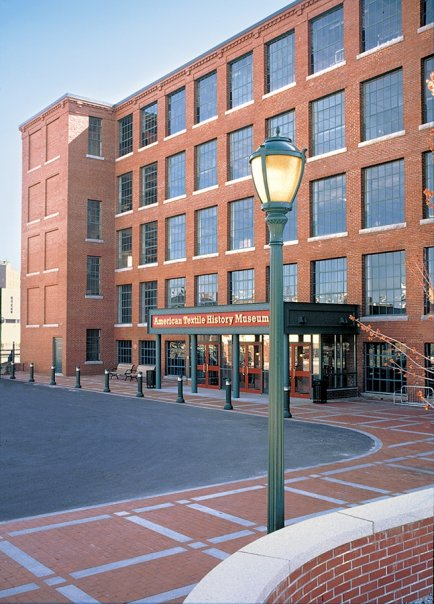
- Established: January 1960
- Dissolved: June 14, 2016
- Location: Lowell, Massachusetts
- Coordinates: 42.6417°N 71.3168°W
- Public transit access: MBTA; Lowell

The American Textile History Museum (ATHM), located in Lowell, Massachusetts, was founded as the Merrimack Valley Textile Museum (MVTM) in North Andover, Massachusetts in 1960 by Caroline Stevens Rogers. ATHM told America’s story through the art, science, and history of textiles. In June 2016, the museum closed. The bulk of the library and archives as well as many fabric samples were acquired by Cornell University.

== History ==
In 1958, Caroline Stevens Rogers, a member of a textile industry family and a hand weaver and dyer, came into possession of her father’s collection of over 50 spinning wheels in various stages of collapse and a truck load of heavy beams (the disassembled parts of antique hand looms) as well as dozens of reels, winders, skarnes, riddles, and niddy-noddies. This collection had been cultivated over a 50-year period by her father, Samuel Dale Stevens (1859–1922). Caroline’s husband, Horatio Rogers, a retired doctor, restored many of the pieces.

By the spring of 1958 Caroline was thinking of ways to use her father’s collection of early cloth-making equipment, and, when named as President of the North Andover Historical Society, she decided to add the collection to the holdings of the Society. In 1959, J. Bruce Sinclair became the first Director of the North Andover Historical Society, and he proposed that a regional textile museum be established. He wanted its central concern to be wool and materials for its exhibits to be collected from all over the Merrimack Valley.

At the first meeting of the Advisory Board in January, 1960, those present agreed that the scope of the MVTM should not be limited to a specific geographic area nor by specific chronological dates. In May, 1960, plans for a new building to house the MVTM began. It was completed by the summer of 1961. 18,000 square feet (1,700 m^{2}) of floor space was divided almost evenly among the exhibit, study collection, and administrative areas. As the MVTM became a reality, the staff also grew. In January, 1961 Sinclair hired a secretary, a curator joined the staff in March, and a librarian was added in August.

The exhibits were arranged to tell the story of wool manufacturing. The design was organized around a modular system of floor-to-ceiling posts and panels. The use of silk screens and photographic blow-ups, along with the use of color filled the galleries. The contents of the exhibit illustrated the transition from hand to machine technology in wool manufacturing. A ‘before’ and ‘after’ example was used at each stage in cloth production, from sheep-shearing to cloth-dyeing. The materials shown included artifacts, text blocks, illustrations, models, and replicas. Illustrations outnumbered the 3-dimensional objects by a ratio of 2 to 1. The exhibit contained less than 2 dozen artifacts that illustrated significant developments in textile technology. Among the machines on display were a wool picker, a double cylinder carding engine, a 200 spindle spinning jack, a two-harness plain loom, an automatic bobbin-changing dobby loom and a shearing machine.

In 1971 the MVTM became accredited by the American Alliance of Museums. In 1973 Caroline Stevens Rogers was succeeded by Walter Muir Whitehead, who had been a member of the Board of Trustees of the museum from the beginning. By this time the scope of the MVTM had stretched to include much of the United States up to 1950. The MVTM was also expanding in size. In 1967 a library wing of approximately 6,000 square feet (560 m^{2}) had been added and in 1971, Machinery Hall, a 30,000-square-foot (2,800 m^{2}) study-storage building was completed to house the collection of tools and machinery.

In June, 1984 the Trustees decided that the museum should no longer have a regional name. They wanted a name that encompassed the scope of the museum. So, on September 1, 1984, the Merrimack Valley Textile Museum became the Museum of American Textile History (MATH). It was around this time that the scope of the MATH expanded even further to include the study of manmade and contemporary materials. At this point it became clear that the MATH’s accommodations in North Andover were not enough to support the collection. The main building could not be expanded and Machinery Hall was crammed with artifacts and in a poor location for public access. The Board of Trustees began to consider moving the MATH to an entirely new location. They wanted the MATH to be somewhere that offered better access to the public and was large enough to house their collection, as well as accommodate for future expansion.

At first the plan was to move the MATH to the Heritage State Park in Lawrence, MA. However, in 1985 it became clear that the cost of rehabilitating the building in Lawrence would greatly exceed the original estimates. The search for a new location continued and, on April 30, 1992, the museum purchased the old Kitson Shop in Lowell, MA. Built in the 1860s, the Kitson Shop had been a textile machinery manufacturer. Plans to relocate to the heart of the historic textile manufacturing center of Lowell were underway.

MATH moved to Lowell on April 27, 1997. In Lowell, MATH became the American Textile History Museum (ATHM). ATHM closed in 2007 to renovate its exhibit space. This marked the beginning of a large fundraising effort that eventually netted more than $4 million. In 2008, ATHM introduced its mascot, Lulu the Lamb. ATHM reopened in June 2009 with a broader array of interactive exhibits and activities for both adult and child visitors. It also reopened as a member of the Smithsonian Affiliations. As an Affiliate, ATHM explores object loan options with Smithsonian Institution museums and is also developing a relationship with the Jerome and Dorothy Lemelson Center for the Study of Invention and Innovation.

In November 2011, Jonathan Stevens assumed the role of President and CEO. Mr. Stevens, the son of textile entrepreneur Edward Stevens, is the former CEO of Ames Textile Corporation in Lowell and served previously as a Trustee and Treasurer of the Museum. On March 15, 2012 Jonathan Stevens was named the new President and CEO of the American Textile History Museum.

Due to large deficits, in June 2016 it was announced that the museum was closing permanently.

After the museum closed, its collections were divided between numerous colleges and museums. The museum posted a comprehensive list on its web site, and an archive of that list is available. Some larger transfers include the Marshfield School of Weaving in Vermont, which received the craft tools, many of which are now located at the Newbury School of Weaving. The Kheel Center for Labor-Management Documentation and Archives at Cornell University acquired the bulk of the library and archives as well as many fabric samples. The exhibit of the American Textile Hall of Fame is on permanent display at Revolution Mills, a repurposed textile mill in Greensboro, North Carolina. As of 2025, a textile mill in Franklinville, North Carolina was being renovated to display the ATHM's machinery.

== Osborne Library ==
The Osborne Library was a part of the ATHM that contains an extensive collection of books, prints, photographs, and manuscripts. Users of the library include spinners and weavers, designers, architects, and many more.

== Exhibits ==
Textile Revolution: An Exploration through Space and Time: The permanent exhibit at the ATHM was Textile Revolution: An Exploration through Space and Time. It featured examples of materials that ranged from the protective clothing that firefighters and soldiers wear to the “shark skin” swimsuits of Olympic swimmers. It was a study in how textiles are changing the world.

== American Textile Hall of Fame ==
The ATHM's American Textile Hall of Fame operated from 2001 through 2014. It honors past and present individuals, corporations, and institutions that have made contributions to the textile industry and have helped foster an appreciation of textiles in America.

Class of 2001

- Roger Milliken
- Duke Power
- Samuel Slater

Class of 2002

- Frederick Dent
- Whitin Machine Works
- DuPont
- J. Spencer Love

Class of 2003

- Draper Corporation
- Dalton McMichael
- The men and women of the American textile industry

Class of 2004

- American Viscose Corporation
- W. Duke Kimbrell
- Jack Lenor Larsen
- National Cotton Council

Class of 2005

- Robert C. Jackson
- Saco-Lowell Shops
- Scalamandr`e

Class of 2008

- Levi Strauss & Co.
- Gordon Osborne
- Pendleton Woolen Mills
- James S. Self
- Edward B. Stevens

Class of 2009

- Cotton Incorporated
- Cranston Print Works
- W. L. Gore and Associates

Class of 2010

- Malcolm G. Chace III
- Hugh Wadsworth
- Crawford, Jr. and Stevens Linen Works
- Allen E. Gant, Jr. and Glen Raven, Inc.
- Shaw Industries Group, Inc.

Class of 2011

- Stephanie Kwolek
- Elliott White Springs
- Robert Ten Broeck Stevens

Class of 2012

- Peter Scotese
- Dr. Masahiro Shima

Class of 2013

- J. Dukes Wooters

Class of 2014

- Weavers’ Guild of Boston
- Deborah S. Pulliam
