= Tengku Zafrul Aziz =

Malaysian politician, banker and investor

Yang Mulia Datuk Seri Utama Tengku Zafrul Aziz SJMK SPMS SSAP DPPN SUMW DPMS DSAP DPNS
- تڠکو ظفرول تڠکو عبد العزيز
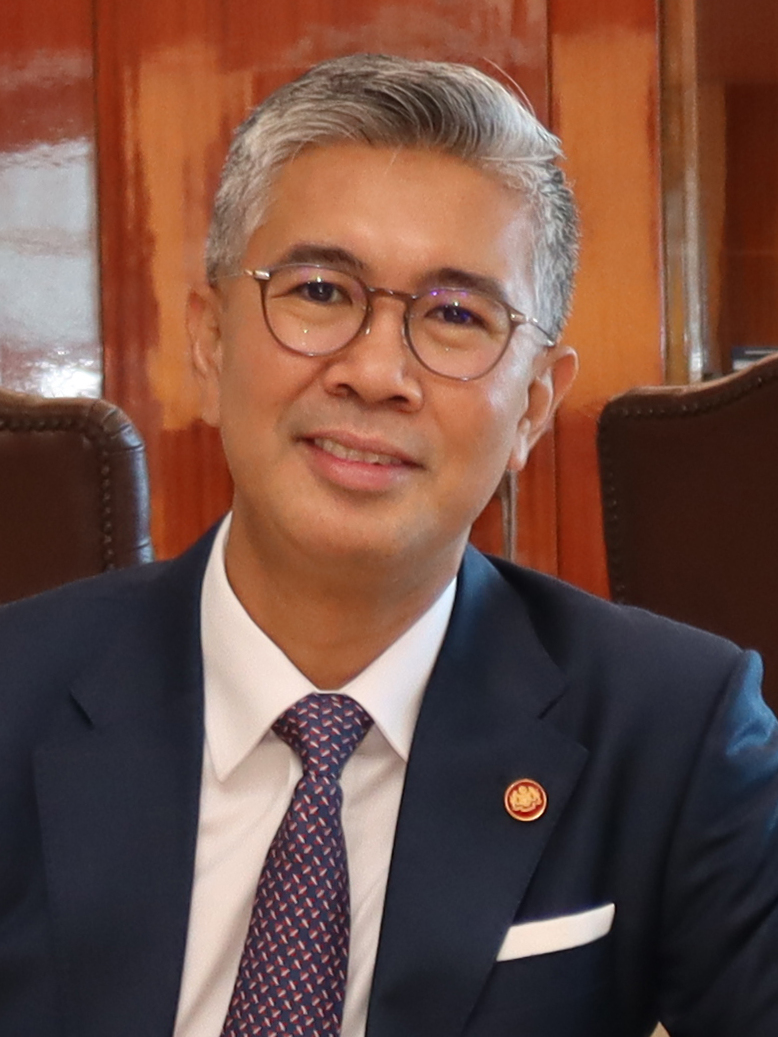
- Tengku Zafrul In January 2023

Senior Political Advisor to the Prime Minister
- Incumbent
- Assumed office 4 March 2026
- Monarch: Ibrahim Iskandar
- Prime Minister: Anwar Ibrahim
- Political Secretary: Chan Ming Kai; Ahmad Farhan Fauzi; Azman Abidin
- Preceded by: Shamsul Iskandar Mohd Akin (Senior Political Secretary to the Prime Minister)

Chairman of the Malaysian Investment Development Authority
- Incumbent
- Assumed office 3 December 2025
- Minister: Johari Abdul Ghani
- Chief Executive Officer: Arham Abdul Rahman
- Preceded by: Sulaiman Mahbob

13th President of the Badminton Association of Malaysia
- Incumbent
- Assumed office 10 May 2025
- Preceded by: Mohamad Norza Zakaria; V. Subramaniam (Acting)

Minister of Investment, Trade and Industry
- In office 5 April 2023 – 2 December 2025
- Monarchs: Abdullah (2023–2024); Ibrahim Iskandar (2024–2025)
- Prime Minister: Anwar Ibrahim
- Deputy: Liew Chin Tong
- Preceded by: Position established
- Succeeded by: Johari Abdul Ghani
- Constituency: Senator

Minister of International Trade and Industry
- In office 3 December 2022 – 5 April 2023
- Monarch: Abdullah
- Prime Minister: Anwar Ibrahim
- Deputy: Liew Chin Tong
- Preceded by: Azmin Ali
- Succeeded by: Position abolished
- Constituency: Senator

Minister of Finance
- In office 30 August 2021 – 24 November 2022
- Monarch: Abdullah
- Prime Minister: Ismail Sabri Yaakob
- Deputy: Mohd Shahar Abdullah; Yamani Hafez Musa
- Preceded by: Himself
- Succeeded by: Anwar Ibrahim
- Constituency: Senator
- In office 10 March 2020 – 16 August 2021
- Monarch: Abdullah
- Prime Minister: Muhyiddin Yassin
- Deputy: Abdul Rahim Bakri; Mohd Shahar Abdullah
- Preceded by: Lim Guan Eng
- Succeeded by: Himself
- Constituency: Senator

Coordinating Minister of the National Recovery Plan
- In office 9 July 2021 – 16 August 2021
- Monarch: Abdullah
- Prime Minister: Muhyiddin Yassin
- Preceded by: Position established
- Succeeded by: Position abolished
- Constituency: Senator

Senator Appointed by the Yang di-Pertuan Agong
- In office 3 December 2022 – 2 December 2025
- Monarchs: Abdullah (2022–2024); Ibrahim Iskandar (2024–2025)
- Prime Minister: Anwar Ibrahim
- In office 10 March 2020 – 3 November 2022
- Monarch: Abdullah
- Prime Minister: Muhyiddin Yassin (2020–2021); Ismail Sabri Yaakob (2021–2022)

Ex-officio Member of the Political Bureau of the People's Justice Party
- Incumbent
- Assumed office 25 January 2026 Serving with Akmal Nasrullah Mohd Nasir, Mohammed Taufiq Johari, Mohamad Abdul Hamid & Zaliha Mustafa
- President: Anwar Ibrahim

State Treasurer of the Barisan Nasional of Selangor
- In office 31 July 2022 – 30 May 2025
- National Chairman: Ahmad Zahid Hamidi
- State Chairman: Noh Omar (2022); Megat Zulkarnain Omardin (2022–2025)
- Preceded by: Jamal Md Yunos

State Treasurer of the United Malays National Organisation of Selangor
- In office 11 April 2023 – 1 April 2024
- President: Ahmad Zahid Hamidi
- State Chairman: Megat Zulkarnain Omardin

Division Chief of the United Malays National Organisation of Kota Raja
- In office 18 March 2023 – 30 May 2025
- President: Ahmad Zahid Hamidi
- Deputy: Abdul Raof Mokhtar
- Preceded by: Kamaruzzaman Johari
- Succeeded by: Abdul Raof Mokhtar (acting)

Personal details
- Born: Tengku Zafrul bin Tengku Abdul Aziz; 25 June 1973 (age 53) Kuala Lumpur, Selangor, Malaysia
- Party: United Malays National Organisation (UMNO) (1997–2025); People's Justice Party (PKR) (since 2025)
- Other political affiliations: Barisan Nasional (BN) (1997–2025); Pakatan Harapan (PH) (since 2025)
- Spouse: Datin Paduka Raja Johanna Adrina Raja Arshad (m. 2011)
- Relations: House of Langkat, Sumatera; House of Deli, Sumatera
- Children: 4
- Education: University of Bristol (BSc in Economics and Accounting); University of Exeter (MA in Finance and Management); Tsinghua University (EMBA)
- Occupation: Politician; investor
- Profession: Banker

Tengku Zafrul bin Tengku Abdul Aziz (Jawi: تڠکو ظفرول بن تڠکو عبد العزيز, Malay pronunciation: [tengku zafrul]; born 25 June 1973) is a Malaysian politician, banker and investor who has served as the Senior Political Advisor to the Prime Minister since March 2026, Chairman of Malaysian Investment Development Authority (MIDA) since December 2025 and the 13th President of Badminton Association of Malaysia (BAM) since May 2025. He served as the Minister of Investment, Trade and Industry in the Unity Government administration under Prime Minister Anwar Ibrahim from April 2023 to December 2025. He is a member of the People's Justice Party (PKR), a component party of the Pakatan Harapan (PH) coalition and was a member of the United Malays National Organisation (UMNO), a component party of the BN coalition. He has also been an Ex-officio Member of the Political Bureau of PKR since January 2026. He was also a Member of the UMNO Supreme Council and Division Chief of UMNO of Kota Raja from March 2023 to his departure from the party in May 2025.

== Early life and education ==
Tengku Zafrul was born on 25 June 1973 and is the eldest of four siblings. His mother, Raja Datuk Zaharaton Raja Zainal Abidin, is the former Director-General Of the Economic Planning Unit (EPU) of the Prime Minister's Department of Malaysia and his father, Tengku Abdul Aziz Tengku Haris, is a businessman.

Tengku Zafrul began his early education at Sri Petaling Primary School and Bukit Bintang Primary School. He continued his studies at Malay College Kuala Kangsar and then studied A-Level at Sherborne School in Dorset, United Kingdom (UK). He graduated from the University of Bristol, UK with a Bachelor of Science (Hons.) in economics and accounting, and obtained a Master of Arts (MA) in Finance and Management from the University of Exeter, UK. From 2017 to 2019, Tengku Zafrul completed his second master's degree for Executive Master in Business Administration (EMBA) at Tsinghua University PBCSF (People's Bank of China School of Finance). He is also a Fellow Chartered Banker with the Asian Institute of Chartered Bankers.

== Corporate career ==
Zafrul started out as a corporate finance executive in AmInvestment Bank in 1996. He then joined Crédit Agricole as an investment analyst, moving up to director within a few years. Succeeding this, he became the advisor to the president of Tenaga Nasional Berhad. Zafrul then joined CIMB Investment Banking, after which he was appointed as group managing director of Avenue Capital Resources (now ECM Libra), a listed company specialising in financial services i.e. investment banking and fund management. He was also chief executive officer of Avenue Securities and the chairman of Avenue Asset Management. Zafrul then went on to become the head of investment banking for Citigroup Malaysia.

He is also the main investor behind Tune Money Sdn Bhd, Asia's first "no-frills" online financial service provider as well as its CEO and substantial shareholder. Following that, Zafrul was appointed as group director of Kenanga Holdings Berhad and director of Kenanga Investment Bank Berhad. Prior to assuming his most recent role with CIMB, Zafrul was the chief executive officer of Maybank Investment Bank, the fully owned investment banking arm of Malayan Banking Berhad, Malaysia's flagship financial services player. The acquisition of Kim Eng Holdings Limited (Kim Eng) by the Maybank Group in 2011 resulted in the combined entity of Maybank IB and Kim Eng, known regionally as Maybank Kim Eng, of which Zafrul was also CEO. On 9 March 2020, Tengku Zafrul announced his resignation as CIMB group chief executive officer before being appointed minister of finance.

=== Other positions ===
1. AmInvestment Bank (corporate finance executive) (June 1996 – April 1997)
2. Credit Agricole (investment analyst and director) (May 1997 – August 1998) & (July 1999 – March 2001)
3. Tenaga Nasional Bhd (president's advisor) (March 2001 – September 2002)
4. CIMB Investment Bank Berhad (director, "client coverage") (September 2002 – April 2003)
5. Avenue Capital Resources Bhd/Avenue Securities (now ECM Libra) (chief executive officer and chairman) (2003–2006)
6. Citigroup Malaysia (head of investment banking) (April 2006 – March 2007)
7. Tune Money (chief executive officer) (March 2007 – December 2008)
8. Kenanga Holdings Berhad and Investment (group director) (January 2009 – June 2010)
9. Maybank Investment Bank Berhad and Maybank Kim Eng Holdings (chief executive officer) (June 2010 – December 2013)
10. CIMB Investment Bank Berhad (chief executive officer and co-chairman of corporate solutions) (2014–2016)
11. CIMB Bank Berhad (chief executive officer) (2014–2015)
12. CIMB Group Holdings Berhad (group chief executive officer) (February 2015 – 9 March 2020)

=== Recognition and awards ===
Throughout his career, Zafrul was awarded with numerous Prestigious Awards including ASEAN CEO Award by Technology Business Review (2008). He also was given the Malaysian Business Leadership Award in the year 2009. Most Promising Entrepreneurship Awards by Enterprise Asia (2008) and the Malaysian Business Leadership Award by The Leaders Magazine. Most recently, he was awarded the Masterclass CEO of the Year in the 7th Global Leadership Award organised by the American Leadership Development Association (2017) and the Best Chief Executive Officer for Investor Relations by the Malaysia Investor Relations Association (2017). Tengku Zafrul has also bagsed TalentCorp's Life at Work 2019 Award for the CEO category of Malaysian organizations.

=== Television and other media ===
Tengku Zafrul was one of the judges of the corporate reality television series The Firm. The show premiered prime time nationwide on NTV7 and Astro's Channel 7 in Malaysia in 2007. As one of the three millionaire judges on The Firm, the other two beings Peter Pek and Chan Boon Yong, he is considered one of Malaysia's few corporate celebrities. He has also appeared in advertisements for Tune Money. On 4 July 2020, Tengku Zafrul became a special guest on TV3's Money Matters program.

Year	Title	Role	Note
2007	The Firm	Himself	As a jury (Season 1 & 2)
2020	Money Matters	Himself	As a special guest

== Political career ==
On 9 March 2020, Tengku Zafrul was appointed in Muhyiddin's cabinet as Minister of Finance after being made a Senator. He is a Senator from March 2020 to his resignation in November 2022 and again since December 2022. Prior to his political appointments, he was the Chief Executive Officer (CEO) and Executive Director of the CIMB Group Holdings Berhad. He was also CEO and executive director of the CIMB Bank Berhad and president commissioner of the PT Bank CIMB Niaga Tbk.

=== Minister of Finance ===
He started his first term from March 2020 to August 2021 as well as Coordinating Minister of the National Recovery Plan from July 2021 to August 2021 in the Perikatan Nasional (PN) administration under former prime minister Muhyiddin Yassin and later for his tenure for the second term in the Barisan Nasional (BN) administration under former prime minister Ismail Sabri Yaakob from August 2021 to November 2022. As he was not an elected Member of Parliament (MP), he was appointed as an independent Senator twice in March 2020 and again in December 2022, in order to assume his duties as the first technocratic Minister of Finance in March 2020 as he was also the first independent individual in terms of active political party association, to be appointed minister of finance in the Malaysian history.

He embarked on a task to assist the people and industry in the implementation of the Prihatin Rakyat Economic Stimulus Package during the outbreak of the COVID-19 pandemic in Malaysia. Tengku Zafrul also explains the economic recovery plan will be announced after Aidilfitri to revive the affected economy of Malaysia. Under the Short-Term Economic Recovery Plan (PENJANA), Tengku Zafrul has launched the ePenjana credit program worth RM750 million to aimed at boosting consumer spending in Malaysia. On 6 November 2020, Tengku Zafrul presented the 2021 budget in the Parliament to ensure that the economy revives and benefits the people.

In June 2022, Tengku Zafrul announced the largest subsidies and cash aid package in Malaysian history (77.3 billion ringgit) for the year 2022, in order to temper the effect of inflation.

=== Minister of International Trade and Industry ===
He first served as Minister of International Trade and Industry in the PH administration under Prime Minister Anwar from December 2022 to April 2023, before the ministry was renamed to Investment, Trade, and Industry.

=== UMNO and BN ===
Tengku Zafrul began his active political career in July 2022 when he was appointed the State Treasurer of Barisan Nasional (BN) Selangor. He subsequently became the State Treasurer of UMNO Selangor in April 2023, a position he held until his resignation in April 2024.

In March 2023, he was elected as the UMNO Division Chief for Kota Raja, and in the same year, he won a seat on the UMNO Supreme Council in the 2023 United Malays National Organisation leadership election.

On 30 May 2025, Tengku Zafrul officially resigned from UMNO, vacating his positions as Supreme Council member and Kota Raja Division Chief. His departure marked the end of his nearly three-decade-long affiliation with the party, having first joined UMNO in 1997.

=== Transition to PKR ===
Following his resignation from UMNO, Tengku Zafrul announced his intention to join the People’s Justice Party (PKR). He stated that the decision came after careful reflection and consultation with colleagues, including UMNO President Datuk Seri Ahmad Zahid Hamidi. He has since informed PKR leadership of his intent and went through the standard application process to become a member. His membership to the PKR was confirmed by PKR Secretary-General Fuziah Salleh on 8 August 2025 and he is currently a member of PKR Ampang Branch.

== Personal life ==
Tengku Zafrul is married to Raja Datin Seri Utama Johanna Adrina Raja Arshad, a member of Selangor and Negeri Sembilan royal family. The couple have two daughters and two sons.

Since his school days, Tengku Zafrul was interested in sports such as hockey and ran for recreation. During his first year at the University of Bristol, his main transportation was by bicycle. His interests include keeping fit through running, cycling and swimming, and developing the youth through his participation in various organisations such as the Kalsom Movement and Teach for Malaysia. He has completed all six marathons under the Abbott World Marathon Majors. He is also a fan of the football club, Liverpool F.C., which plays in the English Premier League.

== Election results ==
Parliament of Malaysia
Year	Constituency	Candidate	Votes	Pct	Opponent(s)	Votes	Pct	Ballots cast	Majority	Turnout
2022	P096 Kuala Selangor	Tengku Zafrul Aziz (UMNO)	30,031	34.73%	Dzulkefly Ahmad (AMANAH)	31,033	35.88%	86,481	1,002	84.00%
2022	P096 Kuala Selangor	Tengku Zafrul Aziz (UMNO)	30,031	34.73%	Mohd Noor Mohd Sahar (PAS)	23,639	27.33%	86,481	1,002	84.00%
2022	P096 Kuala Selangor	Tengku Zafrul Aziz (UMNO)	30,031	34.73%	Mohd Shaid Rosli (PEJUANG)	1,778	2.06%	86,481	1,002	84.00%

== Honours ==
=== Honours of Malaysia ===
- Malaysia
  - Recipient of the 14th Yang di-Pertuan Agong Installation Medal (2012)
  - Recipient of the 17th Yang di-Pertuan Agong Installation Medal (2024)
- Federal Territory (Malaysia)
  - Grand Knight of the Order of the Territorial Crown (SUMW) – Datuk Seri Utama (2021)
- Kelantan
  - Knight Grand Commander of the Order of the Life of the Crown of Kelantan (SJMK) – Dato' (2022) (Note: Scheduled conferred in 2022 but Tengku Zafrul was busy campaigning for the 15th general election so the honour was officially conferred in 2023.)
- Negeri Sembilan
  - Knight Commander of the Order of Loyalty to Negeri Sembilan (DPNS) – Dato' (2014)
  - Recipient of the Tuanku Muhriz Installation Medal (2009)
- Pahang
  - Knight Grand Companion of the Order of Sultan Ahmad Shah of Pahang (SSAP) – Dato' Sri (2015)
  - Knight Companion of the Order of Sultan Ahmad Shah of Pahang (DSAP) – Dato' (2009)
- Penang
  - Knight Commander of the Order of the Defender of State (DPPN) – Dato' Seri (2025)
- Perlis
  - Recipient of the Tuanku Syed Sirajuddin Jamalullail Installation Medal (2001)
- Selangor
  - Knight Grand Commander of the Order of the Crown of Selangor (SPMS) – Dato' Seri (2022)
  - Knight Commander of the Order of the Crown of Selangor (DPMS) – Dato' (2016)
  - Recipient of the Sultan Salahuddin Silver Jubilee Medal (1985)
  - Recipient of the Sultan Sharafuddin Coronation Medal (2003)
  - Recipient of the Sultan Sharafuddin Silver Jubilee Medal (2026)

=== Foreign honours ===
- Monaco
  - Commander of the Order of Saint-Charles (27 November 2023)
