= YouthSays =

Malaysian online youth community

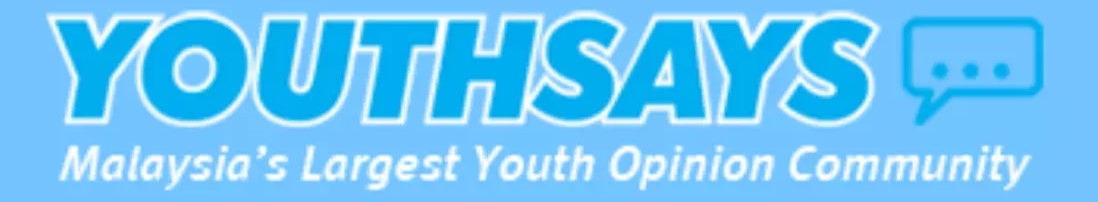
- Website type: Online survey/Online Community/Affiliate network
- Owner: Youth Asia Sdn. Bhd.
- Commercial: Yes
- Launched: May 2008
- Current status: Active

YouthSays is a Malaysian online youth opinion community that is operated and privately owned by Youth Asia Sdn. Bhd. Founded in March 2008, YouthSays works with organisations and businesses to reward youth for collective action. Youths get paid money or prizes for participating in online surveys, advertising campaigns, and campus activities. Originally limited to Malaysia, it has since launched local versions for Vietnam, Indonesia and Philippines. YouthSays is widely known for its active participation in youth campaigns and events across the region including SEAChange (Southeast Asia Youths for Change), Youth '08 and Youth '09, Malaysia National Youth Entrepreneurs Convention (NYEC) 2008 and 2009.

== History ==
The first version of YouthSays originated from the website of Youth Malaysia – a youth NGO started in October 2006 by Joel Neoh. Youth Malaysia organised Malaysia's largest youth festival for the first time, YOUTH'08. It was attended by Khailee Ng, who then collaborated with Joel to come up with the first version of YouthSays.

The YouthSays website then opened for beta testing on 15 March 2008 and officially launched on 2 May 2008 in Malaysia. By the end of 2009, it claimed to have 230,000 members in Malaysia, Philippines, Indonesia, and Vietnam.

== Features ==
The current version of YouthSays includes 4 main features:

- Surveys – Users tell the businesses what they think about their products & services by answering online surveys and get rewarded in return.
- Advertising – It is basically an affiliate network. Users can choose to support social or commercial campaigns and get unique links to promote those campaigns. They get rewarded for every unique clicks on these links.
- Campus – Users list their campus events on Youthsays.com & the Youthsays gets sponsors for their campus events. Students might also be selected to become campus ambassadors for certain brands and get rewarded.
- Community – Users get to ask questions & give answers to each other which allows them to increase their knowledge and make more friends.

== Youth Campaigns and Events ==
YouthSays is widely known for its participation in youths campaigns and events across the region.

=== SEAChange (Southeast Asia Youths for Change) ===
SEAChange is an ongoing movement organised by Youth Asia connecting Southeast Asian Youths to projects, organisations, businesses, and leaders who can help them with the change they want to see. SEAchange used YouthSays as the community organising vehicle to produce the SEAchange Youth Report, where over 180,000 responses from youths from across the region was used to compile a report on change.

500 respondents of the survey were sent to Youth Engagement Summit 2009 (YES2009) where they met business leaders and global change icons including Bob Geldof, Biz Stone, Datuk Seri Tony Fernandes, and Garry Kasparov

=== Youth '09 ===
YouthSays.com was the primary community organising vehicle which brought youths to YOUTH'09. Youth Asia claimed to attract 36,720 youths during that 3 day festival.

== Ambiguity ==
Not-for-profit or for-profit Due to its participation in youths' campaigns and its origin as an NGO, YouthSays is usually mistaken as a non-profit organisation.

== See also ==
- Joel Neoh
