= Joel Neoh Eu-Jin =

Malaysian businessman

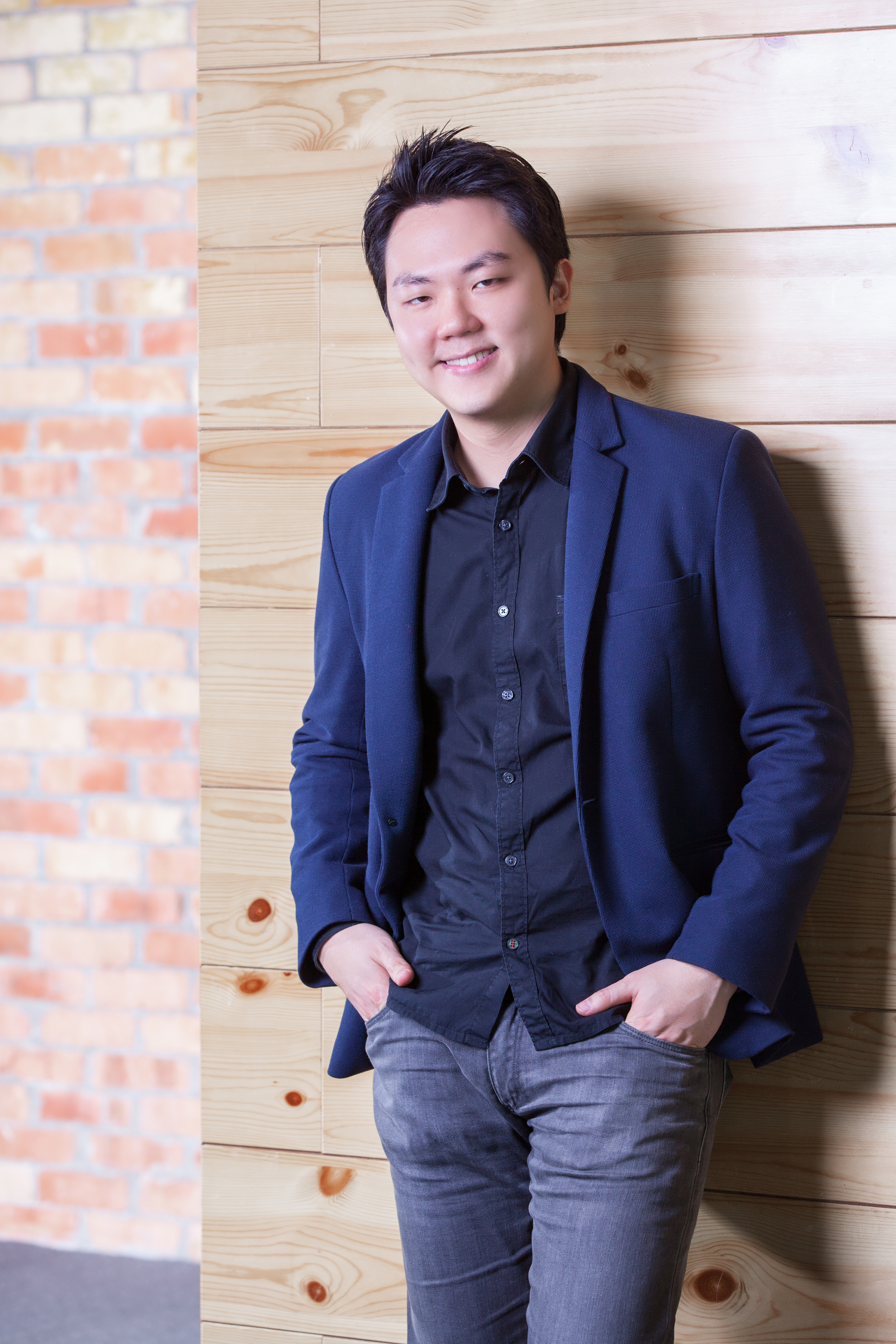
- Joel at Groupon Malaysia headquarters in 2013
- Born: 11 October 1983 (age 42); Kuala Lumpur, Malaysia
- Education: Harvard Business School; Tsinghua University; Monash University
- Occupations: Technology Executive, Entrepreneur & Investor
- Years active: 2006–present
- Height: 186 cm (6 ft 1 in)

Chinese name
- Chinese: 梁友仁
- Hanyu Pinyin: Liáng Yǒurén

Joel Neoh Eu-Jin (born 11 October 1983) is a Malaysian entrepreneur, speaker, and investor. He is best known for his role as the founder of Groupon Malaysia and as the International Vice President of Groupon Asia Pacific. He is the founder of Fave but stepped down as its CEO in 2023.

At the age of 20, his first business venture was a fast-growing student agency set-up. In 2007 he participated in The Firm, Malaysia's first corporate reality television programme produced by Popiah Pictures and ntv7 and became the show's inaugural winner. In 2008 he started a business venture called Youth Asia, a social technology company known for the creation of a few technology startups, including YouthSays (which later on rebranded itself to Says Sdn Bhd) and GroupsMore, which later on joined Groupon via acquisition in 2010.

In 2012 he won the Ernst & Young Entrepreneur of the Year Award for the Emerging Entrepreneur category in Malaysia. He was named as one of Asia's Top 10 entrepreneurs as well as Young Global Leader by World Economic Forum in 2013.

== Early life and education ==
Born and raised in Kuala Lumpur, Joel is the youngest son of two teachers. Joel graduated as one of the top 3 students from his course in Monash University with a degree in mechanical engineering in 2005 and is a Monash scholarship holder. Before that, he completed his South Australian Matriculation at Taylor's College where he was a scholarship holder with an average of 94.45%. At university, Joel won the annual Warman student Design-and-Build Competition. Joel is also a former national representative for rock climbing and squash. Joel completed his executive education at Harvard Business School. Currently he is attending Tsinghua University Executive Master of Business Administration (EMBA).

== Career ==
=== The Firm ===
Joel is the winner of Malaysia's first corporate reality television programme The Firm (Season 1) in 2007 and was the youngest of 10 contestants at the age of 23.

=== Youth Asia ===
Joel's first startup was a student agency which matched fresh graduates with employers. In 2008 he started a business venture called Youth Asia, responsible for running its flagship annual youth event, The Youth Festival - Malaysia's Largest Youth Festival. The Festival was known as YOUTH'08, YOUTH'09 and YOUTH'10 respectively, and gathered over 100,000 young Malaysians within 3 years.

=== SAYS.com ===
Joel's team started YouthSays Sdn Bhd, an online youth opinion community under the Youth Asia umbrella, based in Malaysia. The company was responsible for a few other flagship events and campaigns, including Southeast Asia Youths for Change (SEAChange), a two day summit held in Putrajaya International Convention Center, Putrajaya.

=== Rev Asia ===
As a result of SAYS.com merger with Catcha Media, Joel was appointed to the board of directors of the newly rebranded Rev Asia as a non-executive director.

=== Groupon ===
In August 2010, Joel's team in Youth Asia started GroupsMore, a social e-commerce startup mimicking the Groupon business model. Within 4 months, the company joined Groupon via acquisition in an undisclosed amount and rebranded itself to Groupon Malaysia.

Joel served as CEO of Groupon Malaysia. In 2012, his role expanded to the Taiwan market, where he stood in as CEO of Groupon Taiwan on top of his role in Malaysia. He, later on, stepped up to be the Regional Lead for the Southeast Asian markets, responsible for operations in Malaysia, Singapore, Thailand, and India. In 2013, Joel became the Vice President of Groupon Asia-Pacific, directly responsible for the 12 markets: Japan, Korea, Australia, New Zealand, Malaysia, Singapore, Hong Kong, Taiwan, India, Thailand, Philippines, and Indonesia.

=== KFit and Fave ===
In May 2015, it was announced that Joel's next entrepreneurial venture was KFit, a platform that connects users to fitness studios, classes and gyms across Asia Pacific. It was also announced that KFit had raised a seven-figure US-dollar seed funding round from 500 Startups, SXE Ventures, and Founders Global. Two angel investors also joined in – Daniel Shin, founder and CEO of Ticket Monster, and Danny Yeung, the former CEO of Groupon Hong Kong.

=== Investments ===
In September 2014, it was reported that Joel was part of a group of investors that invested $750,000 in Snaptee, an app that let users turn their smartphone photos into T-shirt designs. Joel is also limited partner investing in 500 Durians, the South-East Asian fund started by Silicon Valley's 500 Startups. He is also the co-founder of the mobile medical application BookDoc.

== Awards ==
In 2012, Joel was named as Ernst & Young's Emerging Entrepreneur of the year. Top 10 of Asia Magazine has also named him as one of the Top 10 Young Entrepreneurs in Asia. Neoh was also awarded the Malaysian Service Medal by the Prime Minister, Datuk Seri Najib Tun Razak. Joel now also serves on the Advisory Board for the School of Business, Monash University.
