= BookDoc =

Malaysian telehealth software

- Original author: Datuk Chevy Beh & Joel Neoh Eu-Jin
- Initial release: October 2015
- Website: bookdoc.com

BookDoc is a mobile application that connects patients with medical care professionals. In 2015, it became the first healthcare online platform in Malaysia that provides such services.

== History ==
BookDoc was founded in July 2015 by former BP Healthcare Group managing director Datuk Chevy Beh, and co-founded by Groupon Malaysia founder Joel Neoh Eu-Jin. The app was inspired after a friend of Beh's had a near-death experience. His friend came down with dengue fever. After initially not being diagnosed with such, he was sent home. Three days later his condition worsened and he went to the hospital to be admitted. He was not immediately admitted and his condition worsened. Beh was able to contact the hospital and arrange for his friend's expedited admission, which physicians mentioned saved his life.

Beh had a background in the health care industry and began developing BookDoc as a way to connect patients to health care providers. The goal of the app is to expedite diagnosis and patient care. It was officially launched as an app in October 2015. The company received its first funding in September 2015.

Initial investors in the company include Danny Yeung – founder of Groupon Hong Kong, Datuk Yvonne Chia – former CEO of Hong Leong Bank Berhad, Kenny Thing – Chief Marketing Officer of Manulife Insurance Berhad, Dato Sharil Tarmizi – former Chairman of Malaysian Communication and Multimedia Commission, Dato Dr Maimunah – former Deputy Director General of Health Malaysia, and Lee Mean Yeit – former Head of Strategy of Sime Darby Healthcare.

== Platform ==
The platform was initially launched to connect people with healthcare professionals, allowing them to book appointments with doctors using the mobile application. Initially, the app was specific for corporate clients to connect employees with panel clinics and hospitals. Companies using the app have access to an analytic dashboard to view health seeking patterns to help evaluate employee's medical needs.
