= Revolution Cotton Mills =

- Revolution Mill
- U.S. National Register of Historic Places
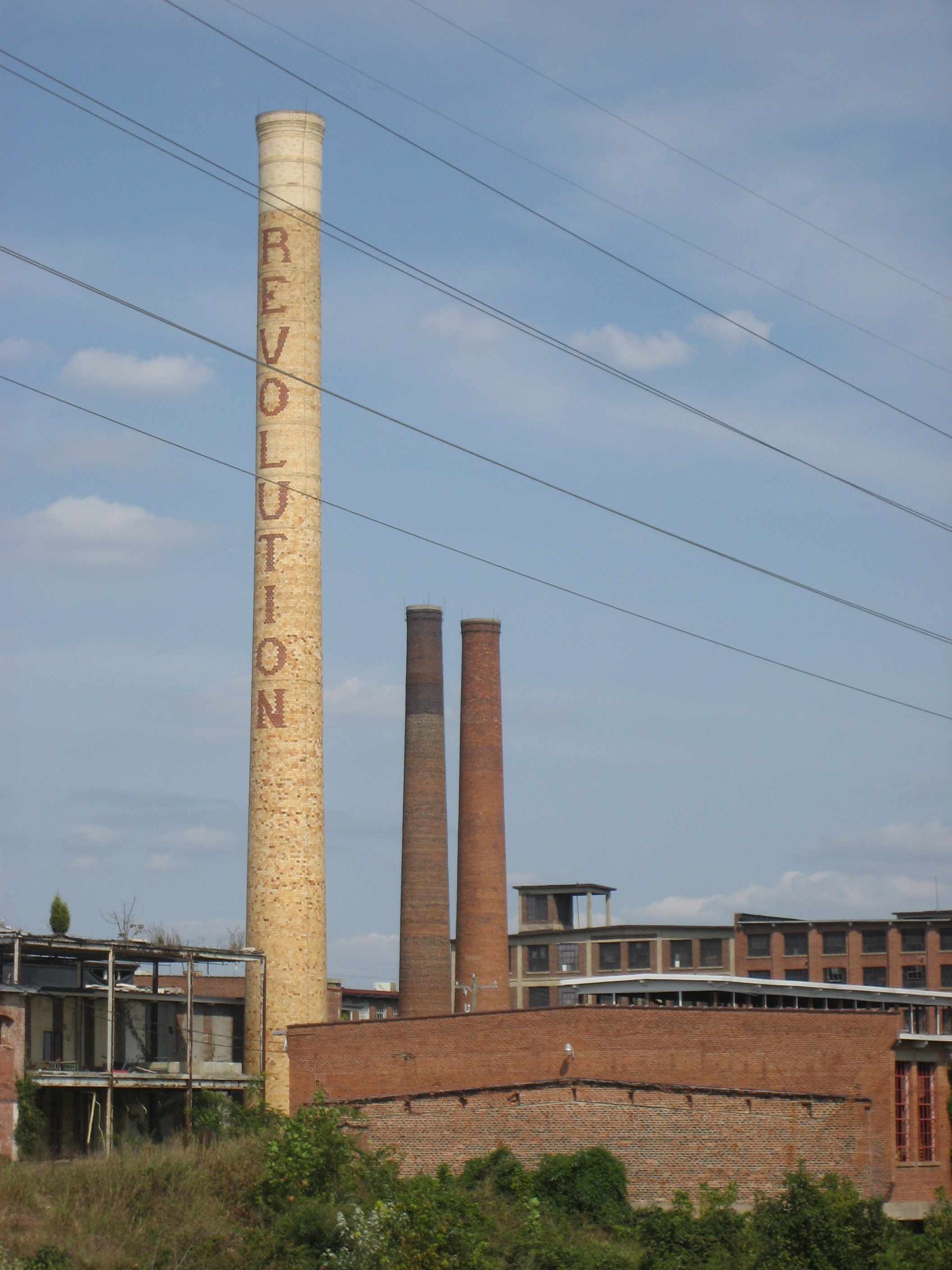
- Revolution Cotton Mills, September 2012

- Location within North Carolina Location within the United States
- Location: Roughly bounded by Southern RR, N. Buffalo Creek, Yanceyville and 9th Sts., Greensboro, North Carolina
- Coordinates: 36°5′57″N 79°46′42″W
- Area: 33 acres (13 ha)
- Built: 1899-1900, 1904, c. 1915
- NRHP reference No.: 84002324
- Added to NRHP: March 1, 1984

Revolution Cotton Mills, also known as Revolution Division and Cone Mills, is a historic cotton mill complex located at Greensboro, Guilford County, North Carolina. The complex was built between 1900 and the mid-20th century and is an example of "slow burning construction." It includes 12 contributing buildings and 2 contributing structures. They include the main mill building, warehouses, weave room and machine shop, bleachery and dye room, storage/shipping/office building, and yellow brick chimney stack. The mill ceased operation in February 1982. As of 2024, the 45-acre complex includes 800,000 square feet of space with office, residential and retail development and event space. 140 businesses and nonprofits have located in the building, and 20 percent of its 184 apartments are considered affordable.

It was listed on the National Register of Historic Places in 1984. Its significance as what may have been the first flannel mill in the South included its status as "the most intact of the turn-of-the century Cone-affiliated textile mills in Greensboro".

A Winston-Salem company bought the complex for the purpose of converting it into condominiums and a shopping center. Frank Auman and Jim Peeples converted half the space into offices but after they defaulted on a loan, the property went into foreclosure. In September 2012, Self-Help Ventures bid $8 million, and renovation work began in Spring 2013. The section already upgraded had 45 tenants, and the remaining space could have 90 more. In December 2015, the city council approved an incentive grant of $1 million which required Self-Help to invest $85 million by 2018. Plans included offices, artist space and 142 apartments. As of the October 18, 2017 celebration of the complex's renovation, 92 percent of the first building was occupied, and a second building was almost half full if the third floor was not included. Businesses provided 1260 jobs.

2005 @ Revolution Mill, designed by architect G. Edwin "Eddie" Belk, officially opened May 1, 2024. Located at 2005 Yanceyville Street, the development is a five-story 145,000-square-foot building which formerly served as a warehouse. It cost $38 million, $17 million of that from state and federal tax credits. A glass ceiling provides light, while the floors remain original. The building, expected to be full by the end of 2024, includes 33 apartments and offices for Cone Denim and others. The development included a spa and a nail salon, and restaurants and a brewery taproom were planned, as well as a courtyard for events.

Besides for architectural elements retained from the factory, the office spaces incorporate several museum elements. Displays of milling machinery are dispersed along the public hallways. Larger exhibits include "The Fabric of Memory," a permanent exhibit based on oral histories of residents of Revolution and other Cone Mill villages. Another permanent exhibit is the American Textile Hall of Fame. The Central Gallery hosts temporary exhibits of artwork, often made of fabric or having a fabric mill theme.
