= Jonathan Putra =

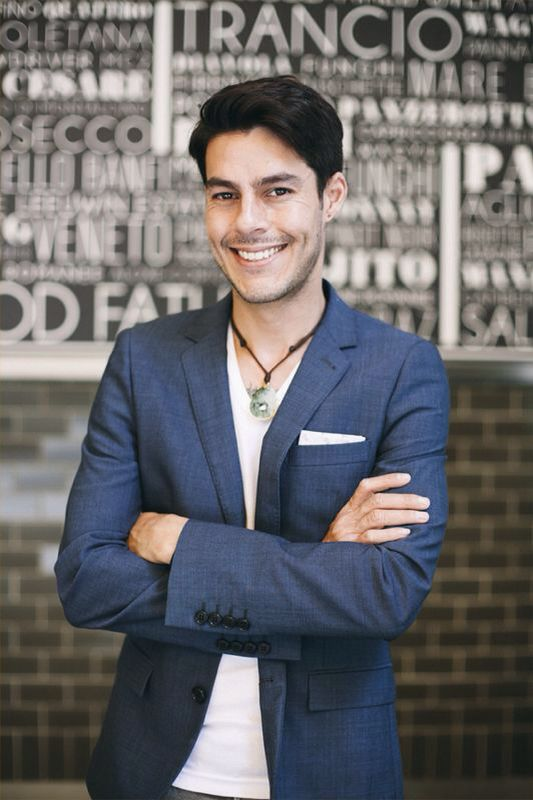
- Putra in February 2014
- Born: 12 September 1982 (age 43); Middlesbrough, United Kingdom
- Other names: JP
- Occupations: Television host, actor and video jockey

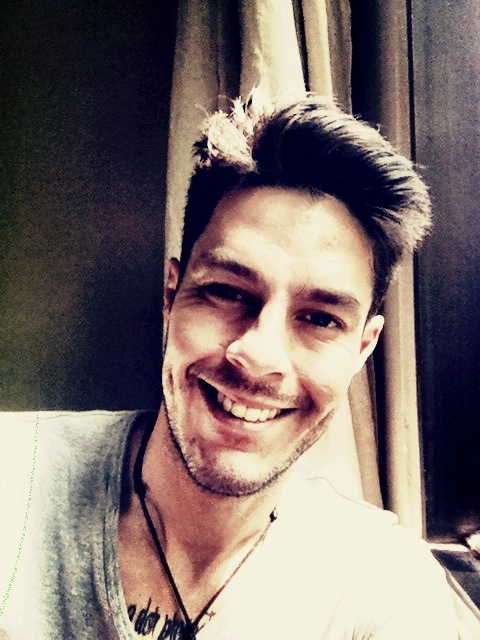
A picture of Jonathan Putra taken from his Instagram

Jonathan Putra (born 12 September 1982 in Middlesbrough, United Kingdom), commonly known as JP, is a presenter, actor and disc jockey.

== Early life ==
Putra spent his childhood in McHenry County, Illinois. During this time he performed around the American midwest with his band, Colour. Putra attended Prairie Ridge High School in Crystal Lake, Illinois and went on to continue his studies in Education and Finance at Broward Community College in Pompano Beach, Florida.

== Career ==
After completing his education, Putra moved to Malaysia to start a career in entertainment as a video jockey for Channel V International. After presenting on Channel V for nearly two years on a range of shows, including ARCADE and Bid It, he moved to NTV7 to host a new program called Life Session—a lifestyle show which Putra hosted alongside Xandria Ooi and Wan Sariah Jaafar. The show covered topics including from style, health and home decoration, with Putra hosting the cooking segments. After a year long season of Life Session, Putra moved to hosting NTV7's morning talk show, The Breakfast Show, alongside Malaysian television personalities Daphne Iking, Nazrudin Rahman, Hansen Lee, Sharifa Aleya, and Elaine Daly.

Aside from hosting television programs, Putra also acts for films and television programs. He is known for his roles as Cikgu Ben in Elly & Epit, Samuel & Danial in the Ariana Rose, Johan in Pengancam Perkhawinan and Ryan in the telemovie Hanya Di Atas Kertas.

Putra also officiates events as master of ceremonies, DJs for Air Asia's in-flight radio programs and models for brands, including Dolce & Gabbana.
