= Life Session =

Lifestyle talk show

- Starring: Jonathan Putra, Xandria Ooi, Wan Sariah

Production
- Running time: 60 minutes (including commercials)

Original release
- Network: NTV7
- Release: April 2007 – present

Life Session is a television lifestyle talk show catered to urbanites. With its magazine format, this show complements NTV7’s lifestyle belt and boasting five different genres – one for each day. The hosts of the program are Jonathan Putra and Xandria Ooi. Life!Session encompasses locally produced and also syndicated programmes from the United Kingdom, the United States, Canada and Singapore. The various genres include one unique theme programme for each day:

Day	Topic	Description
Monday	Far and Wide	Covering travel and well-being
Tuesday	Beautification	Covering beauty, fashion couture, and vogue
Wednesday	Cinemania	Featuring today’s hottest celebrities and the latest Hollywood gossip and local celebrities
Thursday	Design Rivals	Covering home and garden
Friday	Party Dish	Covering on all types of gastronomical delights
