= Is Not Magazine =

Magazine developed by is not .LLC

Is Not Magazine was an alternative bi-monthly magazine in the form of a 1.5 m (4 ft 11 in) by 2 m (6 ft 7 in) bill poster, produced in Melbourne, Australia between 2005 and 2008.

== History ==
Is Not Magazine' was created by five young Melbourne writers and designers, who edited the magazine: Mel Campbell, Stuart Geddes, Natasha Ludowyk, Penny Modra, and Jeremy Wortsman. The first issue appeared on 9 April 2005, and after 11 issues (plus several special issues) the magazine was officially declared defunct on 30 August 2008.

Most of the content was by the editorial team or from young local writers and illustrators, though submissions of articles, reviews, fiction, or other responses to the themes for a planned issue were open to anyone. Is Not contributors also hailed from Finland, the United States and Argentina.

The magazine was posted at 50 sites around Melbourne on public walls and in venues including cafés, bars and laundromats. Is Not was a non-profit enterprise that received no revenue from advertising; instead it was funded by charging entry to its issue launches, which were themed parties with live music and entertainment rather than traditional literary launches. Is Not was also available worldwide by sales of subscriptions and back issues on its online store. It was only available in its full-size poster format.

Is Not exclusively used fonts created by the European typographic design studio Underware. Issue four was repackaged in booklet format (though at full size and with no other changes to its layout) as Is Not Take-Away #1, intended as a showcase of Underware's typography.

In October 2007, Is Not produced a special issue in conjunction with the Melbourne International Arts Festival to celebrate the career of festival guest, choreographer Merce Cunningham. The editors described the "Who Is Merce Cunningham?" issue as "a map-like interconnected sea of names, works, events, and places associated with Merce, along with articles that form a group/personal/historical document of this artist and his contribution to contemporary art and culture."

== Philosophy ==
The magazine aimed to explore complexity and ambiguity in both its format and content. Each issue had two seemingly contradictory or overlapping themes, with writers and illustrators encouraged to address the relationship between the two.

The magazine served as an outlet for new writing, but its design was also an "editorial experiment". The poster had grid references at its edges, used for the contents instead of page numbers. Submissions were accepted not only via post and email, but also via SMS or by writing on the posters themselves. Some short articles, poems and stories were deliberately printed at a size which could be read when photographed by a mobile phone camera.

"Just the idea that a magazine can be more than words on paper is something we like," said co-designer Jeremy Wortsman. "And it maintains this sense of curiosity, wonder and innovation".

Is Not was also an experiment in the uses of public space for purposes other than advertising. "We recognise that people are very suspicious of advertising material encroaching on their lives. They don’t like being treated as a target market," said co-editor Mel Campbell. "It’s really important to us that we address people in a genuine way, as thinkers, readers and as citizens who are engaged with the city around them."

== Local and international recognition ==
In 2005 issue two of Is Not Magazine was featured at the TypeCon design conference in New York.

The magazine was featured at the CMYK Magazine Festival in Barcelona.

In 2007 Is Not was featured at Colophon 2007, a magazine festival in Luxembourg curated by Jeremy Leslie, Andrew Losowsky and Mike Koedinger.

The magazine was featured in The Melbourne Design Guide, a definitive catalogue of creative culture in Melbourne.

Is Not Magazine formed part of the city of Melbourne's successful submission to UNESCO's City of Literature program.

In 2009, the magazine was displayed in The Independent Type: Books and Writing in Victoria, an exhibition of local literary history held at the State Library of Victoria.

== Awards ==
Geddes and Wortsman won the 2006 Victorian Premier's Communications Design Prize for their work designing Is Not's first six issues.

In 2009 the final issue, "All That Glitters Is/Not Gold", was nominated for the Designs of the Year award at the Design Museum in London.

== Subsequent projects ==
From their collaboration on Is Not, Geddes and Wortsman together founded Chase & Galley, a collaborative design practice with a particular focus on publication design.

Wortsman also founded an illustration agency called the Jacky Winter Group, which specialises in placing work by Australian illustrators in international publications. Wortsman also established a Melbourne gallery space known as Lamington Drive. Due to his expanding commitments Wortsman stepped down from his directorship of Chase & Galley, but returns for occasional projects.

Modra went on to edit ThreeThousand, a weekly email newsletter of Melbourne "subcultural snapshots": the best things to do, watch, hear, eat, drink and buy in Melbourne. Modra is also a journalist and art critic.

After working as a music and arts publicist, Ludowyk pursued a career in market and social research.

Campbell co-founded the Australian online arts and culture magazine The Enthusiast. Campbell is also a journalist specialising in popular culture.
