= Projek Kalsom =

The Kalsom Movement began as Projek Kalsom, a student-led motivational camp for youth held annually in August in Malaysia by university student-leaders since 1994. The Kalsom Movement became a fully registered youth-led organisation in 2012.

Programmes are open to all Malaysian students regardless of ethnicity, gender, religious or political background.

Every year, the Movement brings together 16-year-old Malaysian secondary school students from Band 3 and below schools (underperforming schools, as outlined by the Ministry of Education, Malaysia) for Projek Kalsom, a week-long programme of English Language modules, careers, scholarship and personal development workshops, and other education programmes.

A significant proportion of the Kalsom Movement's facilitators are Malaysian university students from Oxford University, University of Cambridge, and Russell Group universities as well as Ivy League universities such as Harvard, Cornell, and Princeton University.

== Organisation Background ==
In 1993, a group of Malaysian students read a newspaper article about Kelthom Abdullah, a single mother living in the rural areas of Kelantan, Malaysia, who could not bear the cost of her children's education. The students raised funds for Kelthom and organised the first Projek Kalsom motivational camp for underprivileged students in Jerantut, Pahang in 1994. The founders of Projek Kalsom were also the founders of the United Kingdom & Eire Council for Malaysian Students (UKEC).

Subsequent Projek Kalsom motivational camps were rotated between the 11 states and federal territories of West Malaysia. In 2012, under the leadership of Hannah Nazri (2011 Projek Kalsom 17 Director), formerly a medical student of University of Bristol, Projek Kalsom became a registered entity known as Kelab Belia Kalsom under the Registrar of Youth Societies (Ministry of Youth & Sports, Malaysia). In 2012, the Projek Kalsom motivational camp was held for the first time in East Malaysia, in Miri, Sarawak. The following year, the first Bristol Commonwealth Cultural Programme was held, where 10 British university students participated in the Projek Kalsom motivational camp in Kuantan, Pahang. In 2014, under the leadership of Mohd Zulikhwan Ayub (2013–2015 Kelab Belia Kalsom President), Kelab Belia Kalsom underwent a major transformation phase with an expansion plan of partnerships in place, an increase in the number of volunteer applications by nearly 300%, an introduction of a one-year Kalsom Harapan plan, and a rebranding as the Kalsom Movement.

Since 2014, the Kalsom Movement remained the only student-led organisation to receive support and endorsement from Bursa Malaysia (formerly Kuala Lumpur Stock Exchange). In 2015, The Kalsom Movement was nominated as one of the Top 10 Organisations (Education and Community) for the Merdeka Award. Projek Kalsom is endorsed by the Malaysian Book of Records as the longest student run motivational camp in Malaysia. For 2018, the Kalsom Movement received the support of Shell Malaysia and was the only student-led charity to benefit from the Shell Raya Charity Campaign 2018. In 2022, The Kalsom Movement was one of the five shortlisted non-profit organisations for the 2022 Commonwealth Education Awards under the category of "Rethinking Education for Innovation".

The tour of all 14 states and federal territories of Malaysia was completed with the 2015 Projek Kalsom 21 in Papar, Sabah. In 2015, the movement received 364 applications for 40 facilitator positions from Malaysian students studying in 15 different countries including the United Kingdom, Ireland, United States of America, Canada, Poland, Spain, Egypt, and Indonesia. Eleven international facilitators through the Bristol Commonwealth Cultural Programme (third year running) and American Fulbright Scholars were also selected to encourage relationships between the two countries and to encourage English speaking between Projek Kalsom student-participants.

== Current Programmes ==
Flagship programmes that are held annually:

- Projek Kalsom Motivational Camp - The movement's one-week motivational programme.
- Commonwealth Cultural Programme - A community tourism programme in partnership with Bristol Students Commonwealth Society to bring non-Malaysian students to explore Malaysia via a series of education initiatives and community programmes.
- Kalsom Harapan - Initially started in 2012, the revisit workshop is held for Projek Kalsom motivational camp student alumni of the previous year in January of the following year, firstly in collaboration with Malaysian Students' Council of Australia. This programme has been extended to two revisit workshops and Kalsom Academy organised by the beneficiaries for other students in their respective schools with the mentorship of facilitators and teachers. The 2017 revisit workshop was attended by Tengku Amir Shah ibni Sultan Sharafuddin Idris Shah, the Crown Prince of Selangor.
- Entrepreneurship and Innovation Workshop - A programme that was first designed in 2015 to train beneficiaries with business and entrepreneurship skills.
- Kalsom Global Outreach Programme - A platform established in 2015 for students globally to design and implement social ventures. Among the beneficiaries include Projek Rafflesia (Malaysian students in the United States) and Seeds of Deeds Motivational Camp by Small Changes.

Previous programmes:

- Kalsom Scholarship Workshop - A workshop held for the first time in 2014 to teach students interview skills.
- Kalsom English Enrichment Programme - An initiative in 2014 to motivate students to learn English through explorative methods.
- Projek Whiteboard - An online crowdfunding initiative held monthly in 2015 to assist schools from marginalised areas with financial assistance.
- Kalsom Goes Cyber Workshop - A workshop held in 2016 to expose students to coding.
- Keen for Knowledge Campaign - A secondhand book donation drive first held in 2015.

== Notable Alumni of The Kalsom Movement (formerly Projek Kalsom) ==
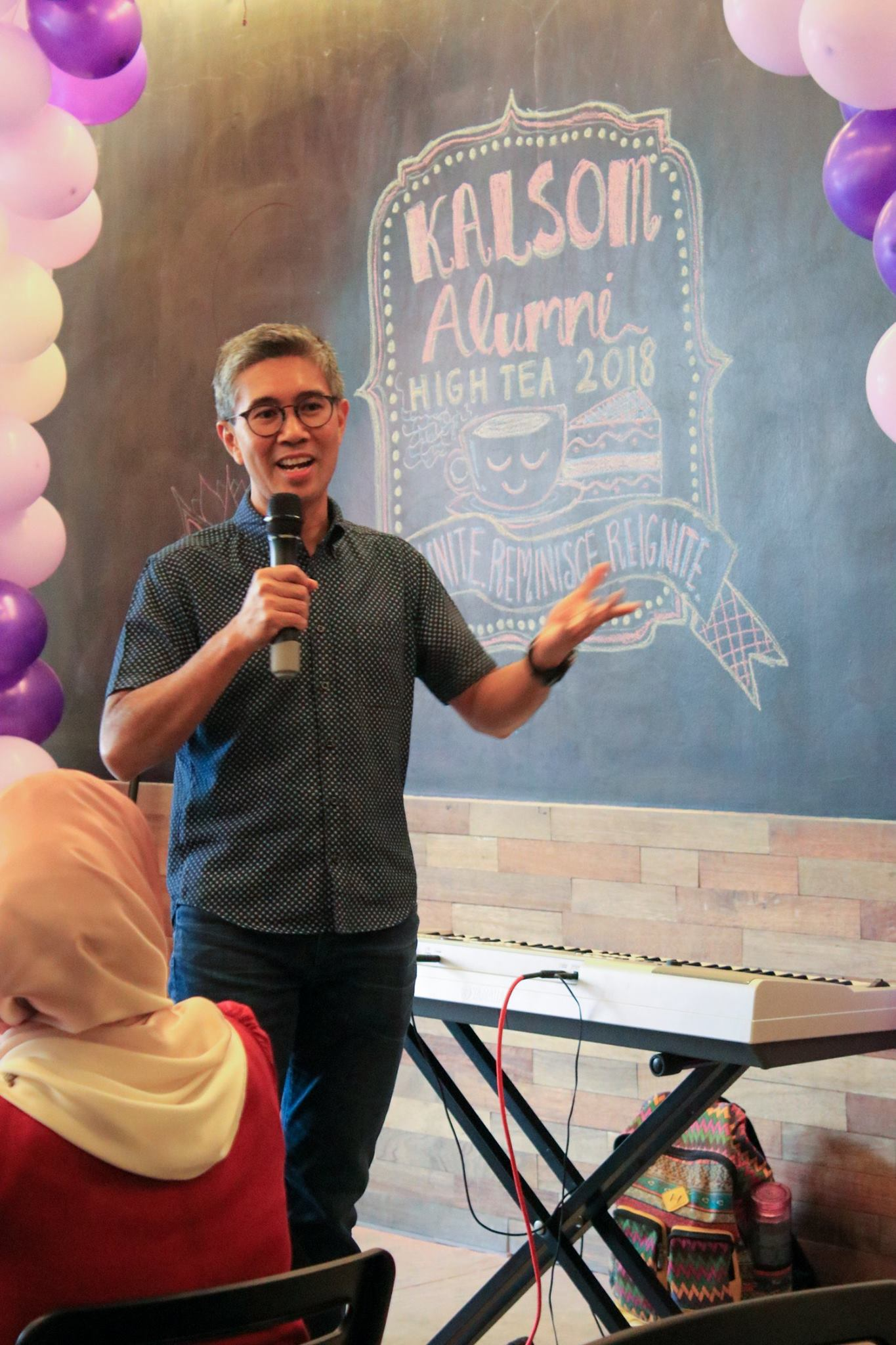
Tengku Dato' Zafrul Bin Tengku Abdul Aziz, CEO of CIMB Group sharing his experiences of being a facilitator in Projek Kalsom 1 in 1994 during The Kalsom Alumni High Tea 2018 in Kuala Lumpur.

Members of the Kalsom Movement alumni consist of both Malaysian university student-leaders (facilitators) and beneficiaries (student-participants). Alumni include:

- Abdul Rahman Mohd Redza - Former Member of the Negeri Sembilan State Assembly for Linggi (2013 to 2023), one of the primary founders of Projek Kalsom and alumnus of London School of Economics and Political Science.
- Tengku Dato' Zafrul Bin Tengku Abdul Aziz - Former Minister of International Trade and Industry of Malaysia (April 2023 to December 2025) and 1994 Kalsom 1 alumnus (facilitator).
- Rafizi Ramli - Former Minister of Economy of Malaysia (2022 to 2025) and Member of the Malaysian Parliament for Pandan and 1996 Projek Kalsom 3 alumnus (facilitator).
- Nik Nazmi Nik Ahmad - Former Minister of Natural Resources and Environmental Sustainability of Malaysia (2023 to 2025) and has represented Setiawangsa constituency since 2018. He was a 2004 Projek Kalsom 10 alumnus (facilitator).
- Soo Wincci - Miss World Malaysia 2008, recording artist and music producer, model, PhD holder. Soo Wincci was a facilitator of the 2006 Projek Kalsom 12.
- Dr Hannah Nazri - Obstetrics and Gynaecology Registrar in the NHS, University of Oxford alumna, and finalist of Tatler Malaysia Front & Female Award for Social Impact 2026. She was the Founding President of Kelab Belia Kalsom.
