= Newbury School of Weaving =

Craft school in Newbury, Vermont

- The logo of The Newbury School of Weaving.

Location
- Newbury, Vermont; United States; 44.07978°N 72.05960°W

Information
- Former name: Marshfield School of Weaving; Weaver's Croft
- Established: 1975
- Website: newburyschoolofweaving.org

The Newbury School of Weaving is a craft school located in Newbury, Vermont. Instruction focuses on Euro-American traditional weaving, spinning, dyeing, and other textile techniques, with an emphasis on rediscovering techniques that have fallen out of use since the mid-19th century.

== History ==
After working as master weaver at Colonial Williamsburg, Norman Kennedy (b. 1933) founded Marshfield School of Weaving in 1975. Virginia Stranahan, a friend of Kennedy's from his Gaelic folk singing tours, supported the renovation of a 19th-century barn for the school. Kennedy taught based on methods he had learned from handweavers in Aberdeen and the Outer Hebrides in his youth. Over the course of six weeks, students would spin a sheep's fleece into yarn, weave it into a blanket, and waulk it with Scottish songs. Kate Smith, who would later found Eaton Hill Textile Works, joined Kennedy as a teacher in 1982. The first iteration of the school closed in 1992.

In 2007, with experience in historic textile reproduction, Smith reopened the school as director. In 2016 the school reconstituted its original nonprofit, making it eligible to receive a donation of looms, spinning wheels, and other historic equipment as part of the de-accessioning of the collection of the American Textile History Museum.

Kate Smith retired as director of the school in November 2023. Justin Squizzero, a student of Smith and Kennedy, took on the role in January 2024. In September of that year the school relocated to the former Methodist chapel on the common in Newbury, Vermont. In 2025 the school changed its name to The Newbury School of Weaving.

== Projects ==
Kate Smith has documented the school's process of setting up a 4-post barn loom in the manual Warping & Dressing the Early Hand Loom. The school also promotes an online "Early Hand North American Handloom Survey" to gather information about the "style, construction, and features" of the textile technology of this period.

The campus formerly hosted a semiannual Textile History Forum for academic research, organized by Rabbit Goody of Thistle Hill Weavers.
