= Lawrence Heritage State Park =

State park in Massachusetts, United States

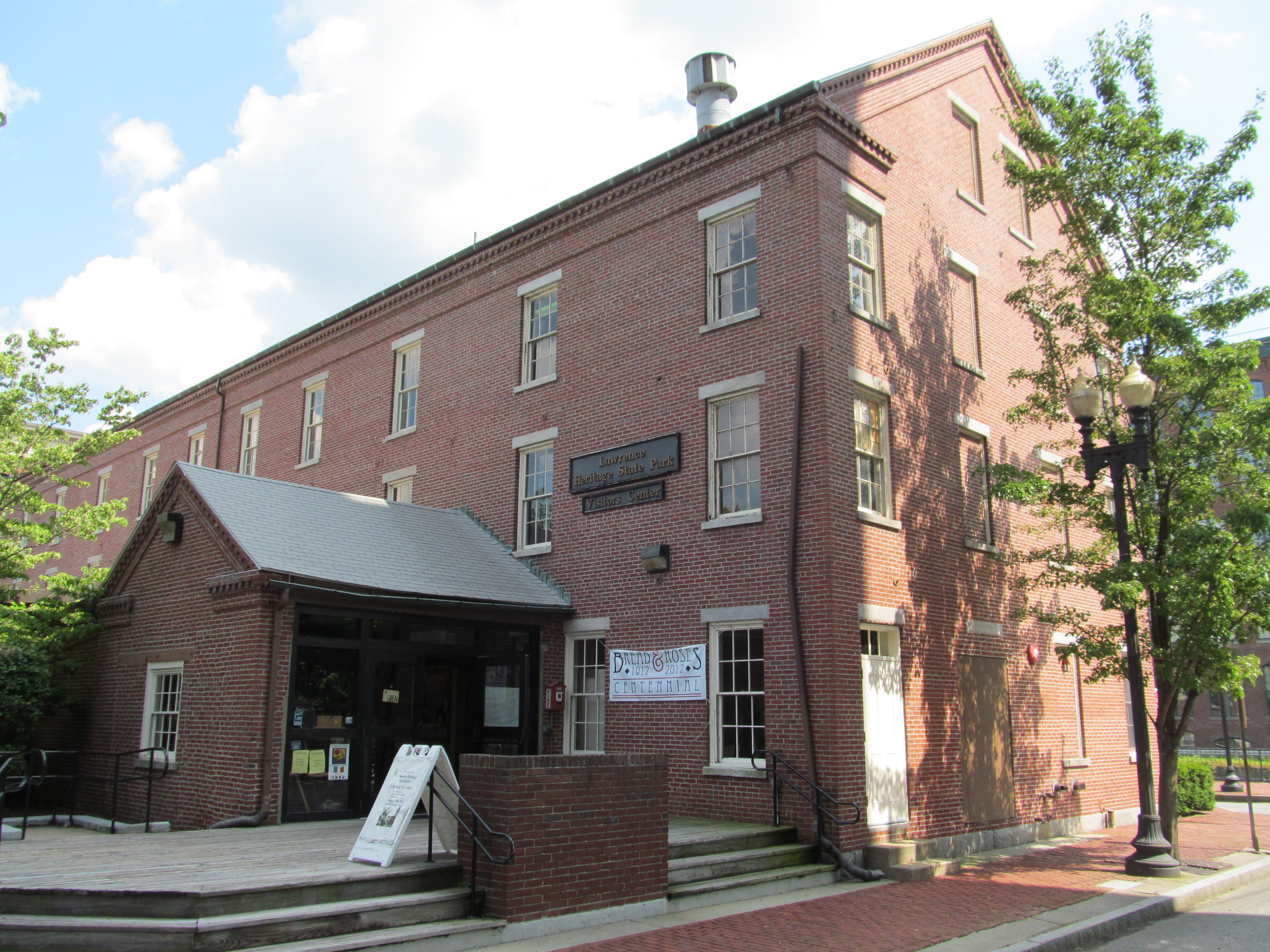
- Visitor Center

- Location within Massachusetts Location within the United States
- Location: Lawrence, Massachusetts, United States
- Coordinates: 42°42′24″N 71°9′27″W
- Area: 50 acres (20 ha)
- Established: 1980
- Administrator: Massachusetts Department of Conservation and Recreation
- Website: Official website

Lawrence Heritage State Park is a history-themed public recreation area dedicated to preserving the industrial heritage of Lawrence, Massachusetts. The state park comprises three separate units on or near the Merrimack River. It is managed by the Massachusetts Department of Conservation and Recreation.

== Park history ==
The development of the state's heritage parks program began with the allocation of $35 million in 1978 for the creation of eight urban parks throughout Massachusetts. The program's aim was to create quality urban space, celebrate the communities' cultural heritage, and stimulate private economic investment. Lawrence Heritage State Park opened in 1980. The restoration of the park's visitor center was completed in 1986.

== Activities and amenities ==
- Visitors Center: The visitors center is located in a restored 1840s boarding house and offers exhibits which detail the life of 19th-century mill workers and the industrial history of Lawrence and the surrounding region.
- Pemberton Park: The 5-acre (2.0 ha) urban park offers views of the city's mills and historic dam while providing opportunities for fishing and boating.
- Lawrence Riverfront State Park: The westernmost section of the park runs along the Merrimack River and has group facilities, playing courts for basketball, tennis, and street hockey, and wooded walking trails. Sailing lessons are given during summer months at the Bashara Boathouse.

The park also offers bike paths, picnicking facilities and public programs that include concerts, theatrical events, and the annual Bread and Roses Festival.

== See also ==
- National Register of Historic Places listings in Lawrence, Massachusetts
