= Popiah Pictures =

Malaysian television production house

Popiah Pictures is a television drama, reality TV and production house from Malaysia. Founded by Anne Low and award-winning film director Ng Ping Ho, the company has produced numerous programmes for television stations such as TV3, ntv7 and 8TV.

== Productions ==
- Getting Together (2000)
- Each Other (2002) TV Series
- Kopitiam (1997) TV Series - 7 seasons
- Table For Two (2004) TV Series
- Realiti (2006) TV Series
- The Firm (2007) TV Series
  - The Firm (Season 1) (2007)
  - The Firm (Season 2) (2008)
- Ghost (2008) TV Series
- 10 (2009) TV mini-series
