= Mel Campbell =

Australian journalist (born 1977)

- Born: 1977 (age 48–49); Melbourne, Australia
- Occupations: Journalist, author, podcaster and cultural critic
- Known for: Co-founder of Is Not Magazine and the online pop-culture magazine The Enthusiast

Melissa "Mel" Campbell (born August 1977 in Melbourne, Australia) is an Australian journalist, author, podcaster and cultural critic. She co-founded the magazines Is Not Magazine and The Enthusiast.

== Biography ==
Campbell studied creative advertising at RMIT University, then pursued a Master of Arts degree by research at the University of Melbourne. Her research concerned the Australian cultural figure of the bogan, which she argued does not refer to a social class, a subculture or an aesthetic, but rather is a consensually imagined figure that arises in Australian media and public debate when Australian national identity is perceived as fragmentary or under threat. As part of her research, Campbell has written and spoken on the Jaidyn Leskie murder case, Ned Kelly, the television series Upper Middle Bogan and the phenomenon of "cashed-up bogans". Campbell's other academic interests include fashion and popular music. Her paper about the non-verbal vocals of Michael Jackson won the International Association for the Study of Popular Music's Postgraduate Prize in 2003.

For the 2004 Melbourne Fringe Festival, Campbell created the satirical character 'The Incredible Melk', a human resources consultant-turned-hip-hop MC. Her comedy cabaret show The Incredible Melk's Booty Pageant was commended in that year's Fringe Awards, and she performed a revised version at the 2005 Melbourne International Comedy Festival.

Between 2006 and 2007 Campbell was pop culture editor at Australian alternative women's magazine YEN. From 2007-8 Campbell was deputy editor at Triple J's monthly music magazine, jmag. She continued to write and review for the magazine on a freelance basis. From 2009-11 Campbell tutored in online journalism at Monash University. From 2008-13 Campbell was the film editor at ThreeThousand, an online subcultural guide to Melbourne, as well as its sister sites around Australia. In 2013, through Affirm Press, Campbell published her debut book Out of Shape: Debunking Myths about Fashion and Fit, a non-fiction investigation of clothing size and fit. In an interview at Crikey, Campbell said, "…clothes are so personal. They're part of our persona, and the feelings of shame and humiliation we feel when we get them wrong [are] very personally felt. You need to lift the lid on that."

In 2016 she taught Advanced Feature Writing in RMIT’s Associate Degree in Professional Writing and Editing, then returned to Monash University to teach in the Master of Communication and Media Studies program.

== Journalism and criticism ==
Campbell is a freelance journalist who writes about popular culture, advertising and branding, media (particularly online media trends) and everyday life. Publications to which she contributes include The Age, The Sydney Morning Herald, Meanjin, Junkee, Crikey, Guardian Australia and New Matilda.

== Creative projects ==
With Stuart Geddes, Natasha Ludowyk, Penny Modra and Jeremy Wortsman, Campbell co-founded Is Not Magazine in 2005, an independently published, bimonthly magazine in the form of a 1.5m x 2m bill poster. Is Not ran for eleven issues (and several special issues) from 2005 to 2008. "We wanted to make a community around this magazine and reinvigorate public space," Campbell told The Age in 2005, "it changes the way you approach reading, because there's no logical place for you to start."

In 2008 Campbell formed the creative partnership Infinite Ape Media with fellow journalists Andrew Tijs and Daniel Zugna. Their first publication was an online magazine of culture and the popular arts called The Enthusiast. Launched in January 2009, The Enthusiast published news, features, opinion and review. The website shut down in 2014.

Campbell co-wrote her debut work of fiction, a romantic comedy novel titled The Hot Guy, in collaboration with film critic Anthony Morris. The book was published in June 2017 by Echo Publishing, an imprint of Bonnier Publishing. They collaborated on a second romcom, Nailed It!, published in 2019.

== Blogging and podcasting ==
Campbell began her personal blog, A Wild Young Under-Whimsy, in March 2004. She also maintains a fashion blog called Footpath Zeitgeist, where she posts research for and discussion about her published work on fashion.

In 2016 Campbell joined the hosting team of the fortnightly literary and culture podcast The Rereaders, alongside regular hosts Sam Twyford-Moore, Stephanie Van Schilt and Dion Kagan. "Steph and Dion laughed when I referred to this podcast as "the famous Rereaders", but to me it really is like that movie Rock Star where Mark Wahlberg plays a tribute band singer who's invited to join the band for real," Campbell said in December 2015 when her role was announced. "Guesting on the Rereaders back in November was so much fun. And I'm looking forward to hanging out more with these guys in 2016, talking about my favourite topic – culture."
