= The Firm (Malaysian TV series) =

Malaysian reality television programme

- Do They Have What It Takes?
- Genre: Reality
- Created by: Anne Low, Ng Ping Ho
- Directed by: Ng Ping Ho
- Starring: Peter Pek, Chan Boon Yong, Zafrul Aziz
- Theme music composer: Ub3rsound
- Country of origin: Malaysia
- Original languages: English, with subtitles in Malay
- No. of seasons: 2
- No. of episodes: 23

Production
- Executive producers: Anne Low, Ng Ping Ho
- Producer: Anne Low
- Production locations: Kuala Lumpur and Klang Valley
- Editors: MS Prem Nath, Amy Lim, Kiang Hon Yeat
- Camera setup: John Goh, Eddie Tham Wai Wing, Boh Lee, Michael Chan Way Kin
- Running time: 60 minutes

Original release
- Network: ntv7
- Release: 24 June 2007 – 25 October 2008

The Firm is Malaysia's first corporate reality television programme produced by Popiah Pictures and ntv7. Hosted by Peter Pek and Chan Boon Yong, the show is directed by award-winning director Ng Ping Ho of Kopitiam fame. In The Firm, a group of professionals compete in an elimination-style competition to find the next corporate high-flyer.

The show attempts to separate the weak from the strong, the under-achievers from the over-achievers and the followers from the leaders. Each week, candidates compete in a series of tasks dealing with different disciplines in business that is imperative to the success of a corporate high-flier. Amongst others, these include branding, promotions, positioning and catering to target markets. The catch phrase used in the show is "You're terminated". The show premièred prime time on ntv7 and Astro channel 7 on 24 June 2007.

Although the show initially drew comparisons to Mark Burnett's The Apprentice, it became quite apparent that it is quite different in that there are two corporate leaders who lead each team and decide who gets eliminated when their team fails to win a challenge. In addition, in episode 7, both corporate leaders leave their jobs as mentors to the teams and a new CEO enters the picture.

The Firm has reached its second season, which premièred on ntv7 and Astro 107 on 2 August 2008.

== Hosts/Judges ==
The Firm has two corporate leaders, and a CEO, who all judge the candidates at different stages:

- Peter Pek: renowned brand guru, writer, columnist, editor, publisher, designer, creative director, public speaker, and head of Malaysia's largest branding agency, Mercatus+.
- Chan Boon Yong: entrepreneur and founder of The Carat Club, a diamond retailer.
- Tengku Zafrul Aziz: CEO of CIMB Investment Banking.

== History ==
=== Season 1 ===
Season one of the Firm premiered on Malaysian television on 24 June 2007, featuring ten aspiring entrepreneurs divided into two teams, Dynamic and Momentum, led by Pek and Chan respectively, vying for a top position in "the Firm", which turned out to be a job offer in Tune Money, among other prizes. Tengku Zafrul's identity remained undisclosed for the earlier half of the season until the remaining contestants merge in the run-up to the finale. The grand prize fell in the hands of Joel Neoh Eu-Jin, who is now known for pioneering "youth entrepreneurship".

=== Season 2 ===
Season two premiered on 2 August 2008, in which fourteen aspiring entrepreneurs vie for the position of Assistant CEO in "The Firm", again divided into two teams – Equity and Asset, led by Pek and Chan respectively. The line up of contestants were:

1) Toh Joo Lee

2) Terrence Lee

3) Choi Kian You

4) Dian Azmi

5) Ain

6) Yuen Wai

7) Salasiah Abbas

8) Chris Lo

9) Boon Yew

10) Jennifer Eu

11) Masami

12) Paige

13) CA

14) Ridzuan

Azti Dian Fitri Azmi, a 31-year-old publications manager emerged the winner. She took home a cash prize worth $100,000 and a job contract to work for Tune Money.
