= Xandria Ooi =

Malaysian writer

- Born: 1983 (age 42–43); Kuala Lumpur, Malaysia
- Occupations: Writer, television presenter, radio announcer, motivational speaker
- Years active: 2002–present

Chinese name
- Traditional Chinese: 黃長娣
- Simplified Chinese: 黄长娣
- Hanyu Pinyin: Huáng Cháng Dì
- Jyutping: Wong4 Coeng4 Tai5
- Hokkien POJ: Ûiⁿ Tióng-tē
- Tâi-lô: Uînn Tióng-tē

Xandria Ooi (Chinese: 黃長娣; pinyin: Huáng Cháng Dì; Jyutping: Wong4 Coeng4 Tai5; Pe̍h-ōe-jī: Ûiⁿ Tióng-tē) is a Malaysian writer, television and radio host, and motivational speaker.

== Writing ==
Xandria's first book, Love, Work and Everything in Between was published in early 2009. Xandria started writing for The Star Publications at the age of 16 under BRATs, a young journalistic program. At the age of 19, Xandria contributed to the column 'The Tale of Two Cities' whilst studying in Melbourne. Xandria wrote for the Metro section of The Star newspaper for 12 years, from the “Tale of Two Cities” to “Watchamacallit” which then became “Sights & Sounds.”

== Television ==
Xandria began her television hosting career with Astro's HITZ.TV Channel, after winning their UVJ Search contest in 2005. She then moved onto Ntv7's Life Session, which she hosted live every week. She started her own production company, 'XO Productions' and the first production was 'Xandria's Weekend Discovery', broadcast on NTV7. She produced and hosted Discover Perak Season One in 2011 and Season Two in 2014, both aired on the Asian Food Channel.

== Fashion ==
In 2009, Xandria, together with fashion designer Sonny San for his label Eclipse, designed a capsule collection for their Fall-Winter 2009 campaign. The collection, called 'Xandria Ooi for Eclipse', consisted of outfits that were convertible so each item could be worn in various ways.
