= Chan Boon Yong =

- Occupation: Diamantaire

Chinese name
- Chinese: 曾文勇
- Hanyu Pinyin: Zēng Wényǒng
- Hokkien POJ: Chan Bûn-ióng

Chan Boon Yong, a second-generation diamantaire born in Malaysia and currently based in Shanghai since 2008, is a prominent jeweller specialising in large diamonds and founder of The Carat Club.

Upon graduating from the London School of Economics, Chan began his career as an investment banker with the Rothschild's group in London. After stints in New York, Hong Kong and Singapore, he left to set up his own investment company before starting Capital Diamonds International in Singapore. In 1997, he transformed the diamond wholesale business and founded The Carat Club, a diamond retail operation based in Kuala Lumpur.

The company grew to some 150 people with distribution in Malaysia, Singapore, Hong Kong, China, Taiwan, Macau and the Middle East. Under his leadership, The Carat Club was consistently nominated for Suria KLCC's Best Luxury Retailer and Best Service Awards and in addition, was also the recipient of The 4th Asia Pacific International Honesty Enterprise Keris Award and the SMI-Unicity 2003 Best Product Award. In 2010, the company moved its base to Shanghai to better serve the Chinese market, focusing on the 3 carats and larger segment.

He was one of the hosts and a judge of the corporate reality television series The Firm, where he played himself, acting as a corporate leader and mentor. The show premièred prime time nationwide on ntv7 and Astro's Channel 7 in Malaysia in 2007. As one of the three millionaire judges on The Firm, the other two being Peter Pek and Tengku Zafrul Aziz, he is considered one of Malaysia's few corporate celebrities. He also starred in The Firm (Season 2) with Peter Pek. The second season of the show premièred on 2 August 2008.

Chan was a former president of the Entrepreneurs' Organization (then known as Young Entrepreneurs Organisation), and was once the youngest member appointed to the Board of the Diamond Exchange Singapore. He was the recipient of the Ernst & Young Emerging Entrepreneurs award in 2002, Martel's Elite of the Year in 2005 and Johnny Walker's "walk of Inspiration" recipient. He has been a member of the Young Presidents Organisation since 2003 and has served on the Malaysia and Shanghai Chapter boards.
