= Anne Low =

Canadian multi-disciplinary artist

- Born: 1981 (age 44–45); Stratford, Ontario, Canada
- Known for: Artist, Writer
- Awards: Sobey Art Award 2019 Nominee
- Website: annelow.ca

Anne Low (b. 1981) is a multi-disciplinary artist based in Montreal, Canada. She uses sculpture, installation, textiles and printmaking to explore the relationship of historical contexts of contemporary functional objects and themes that occur, such as the domestic and the decorative. Her works highly focus on the physicality of an object and utilize her historic knowledge of weaving and various methodologies.

== Biography ==
Low was born in the rural town of Stratford, Ontario and is the granddaughter of dairy farmers and sleigh builders.

Although she grew up far from flourishing art scenes that could be found throughout big cities, she decided to pursue an artistic career and achieved an education both within and outside of Canada.

== Education ==
Low trained at the Emily Carr Institute of Art & Design (formerly the Emily Carr Institute of Art and Design) and completed a Bachelor of Fine Arts (BFA) Integrated Media in 2003. She continued her education in the arts at the Royal College of Art in London, United Kingdom, and received a Master of Arts (MA) in Curating Contemporary Art, with emphasis on exhibition practice, in 2006.

After taking a long hiatus from her artistic career, she found her way back through self-taught weaving and attended the Marshfield School of Weaving in Marshfield, Vermont from 2013-2014 to further sharpen her skills.

== Selected solo exhibitions ==
- 2019: Anne Low: Chair for a woman, Contemporary Art Gallery (CAG), Vancouver, British Columbia
- 2017: Anne Low: Witch With Comb, Artspeak, Vancouver, British Columbia

== Selected group exhibitions ==
- 2019: Sites of the Future, Tensta Konsthall, Stockholm, Sweden
- 2019: Sobey Art Award, Art Gallery of Alberta, Edmonton, Alberta
- 2019: Berlinale: 14th Forum Expanded New Spaces – More Time, Ebensperger Rhomberg, Berlin, Germany
- 2018: Anne Low & Evan Calder Williams: The Fine Thread of Deviation, Mercer Union, Toronto, Ontario
- 2018: Snart nog: Konst och handling, Tensta Konsthall, Stockholm, Sweden
- 2017: Separation Penetrates, Mercer Union, Toronto, Ontario
- 2016: Vancouver Special: Ambivalent Pleasures, Vancouver Art Gallery, Vancouver, British Columbia
- 2015: Reading the Line, Western Front, Vancouver, British Columbia

== Awards ==
- 2019: nominated for the Sobey Art Award, Canada's largest award for young Canadian artists.
