= Peter Pek =

Malaysian businessman

- ڤيتر ڤق
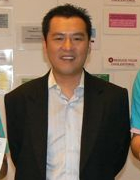
- Occupations: Chief executive, World Branding Forum
- Years active: 1987–2018
- Known for: Former creative director of New Nation, host and judge of the corporate reality television series The Firm and host of Brand Malaysia with Peter Pek
- Website: peterpek.com

Peter Pek is a Malaysian businessman, and the chief executive of the World Branding Forum, a global non-profit organisation that manages and supports a range of programmes. He is also the executive producer of the World Branding Awards. He is the former creative director of New Nation, a British tabloid; the editor-in-chief of Food & Beverage magazine; and publisher of Malaysian Superbrands;. He was a host and judge of the corporate reality television series The Firm. He also starred in The Firm with Chan Boon Yong. The second season of the hit show premièred on 2 August 2008. Peter died on 21 November 2018.

== Background ==
Pek hails from Ipoh, Perak, Malaysia, and studied at St. Michael's Institution, before moving to Sydney, Australia when he was 13. Educated in Sydney, Pek qualified as a Chartered Designer in 1993. He is the chief executive of the World Branding Forum and the executive producer of the World Branding Awards.

== Publishing and design ==
Pek began his career in publishing as a columnist for Sydney-based Livewire Magazine in 1987. In the 1990s, Pek designed launch publications, having worked on the launch editions of Microsoft magazine and SkyPlus magazine (now known as Sky Magazine) for Sky TV. In 1995, he was appointed designer to The Voice, Europe's largest African-Caribbean newspaper. The following year, he was hired to design the launch edition of New Nation newspaper, a British tabloid. In the late 1990s, Pek worked with The Guardian and The Observer newspapers. He was also the creative director of Galazee magazine for the Indian satellite station, Zee TV. He had a stint at the Australian Financial Review before being appointed in 1999 as editor-in-chief of Manila-based Food & Beverage Magazine.

== Television ==
In 2007, Pek appeared in The Firm, Malaysia's first corporate reality television program.

== Radio ==
In 2008, Pek hosted his own talk show on Radio24. His program, Brand Malaysia with Peter Pek aired every Tuesday at 7-8pm, with repeats throughout the week. The show premièred on New Year's Day, 2008.

== Philanthropy ==
A Rotarian, Peter is a past president of the Rotary Club of Gombak, Kuala Lumpur, and district secretary (communications) for Rotary International District 3300. He is a trustee of the Rotary Club of Gombak Charity Foundation. He was formerly the honorary secretary of the Malaysian chapter of the International Advertising Association.
